= Puerto Rico Highway 164 =

Highway in Puerto Rico

Highway 164
- Ruta 164

Route information
- Maintained by Puerto Rico DTPW
- Length: 16.4 km (10.2 mi)
- Existed: 1953–present

Major junctions
- West end: PR-159 in Pueblo–Palmarejo
- PR-803 in Palmarejo; PR-811 in Lomas; PR-165 in Lomas; PR-884 in Achiote; PR-810 in Achiote–Naranjito barrio-pueblo; PR-152 in Achiote–Naranjito barrio-pueblo; PR-5 in Achiote–Naranjito barrio-pueblo; PR-825 in Naranjito barrio-pueblo; PR-815 in Nuevo; PR-8126 in Nuevo
- East end: PR-148 / PR-167 in Nuevo

Location
- Country: United States
- Territory: Puerto Rico
- Municipalities: Corozal, Naranjito

Highway system
- Roads in Puerto Rico; List
← PR-163	→ PR-165

Puerto Rico Highway 164 (PR-164) is the main road from Naranjito to Corozal in Puerto Rico. It begins at the intersection of PR-167 and PR-148 in eastern Naranjito, passing through downtown. Then it goes to Corozal from its junction with PR-5 and PR-152 until reaching PR-159 near downtown Corozal. This road is 16.4 km (10.2 mi) in length.

== Route description ==
This highway consists of one lane in each direction for most of its length between Naranjito and Corozal. In Naranjito, PR-164 travels from its intersection with PR-148 and PR-167 in Barrio Nuevo to the Corozal municipal limit, crossing through downtown Naranjito, Achiote and Lomas barrios on its way across this municipality. In Corozal, PR-164 travels from the Naranjito municipal limit to its western terminus at PR-159 junction, passing through Palmarejo and Barrio Pueblo. Among the most important intersections are PR-5, that goes to Bayamón; PR-152, that heads to Barranquitas; PR-159, the main highway between Morovis and Toa Alta; PR-165, which leads to Toa Alta, and PR-167, the main road between Comerío and Bayamón.

Puerto Rico Highway 164 by municipality

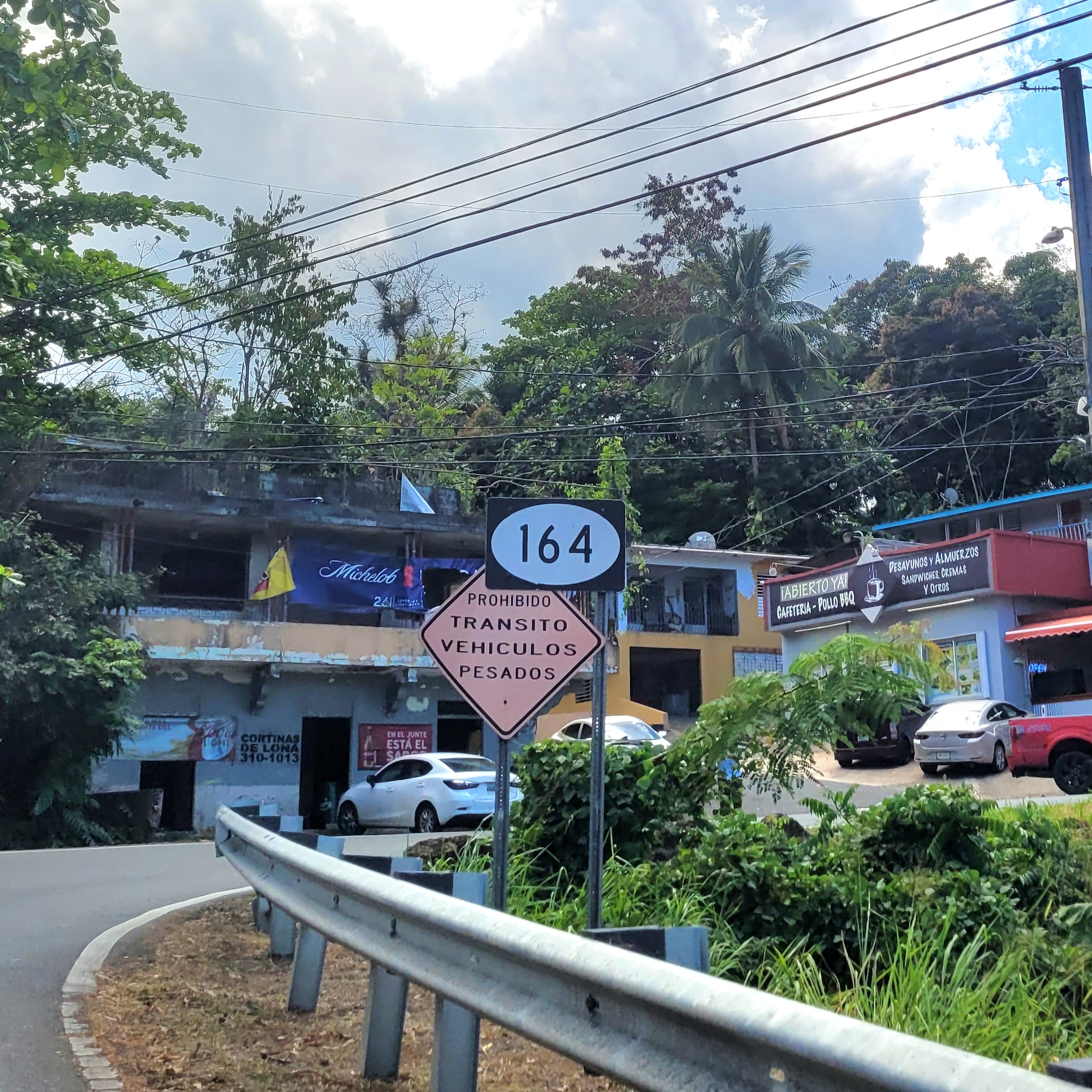
Heading west in Barrio Nuevo, Naranjito

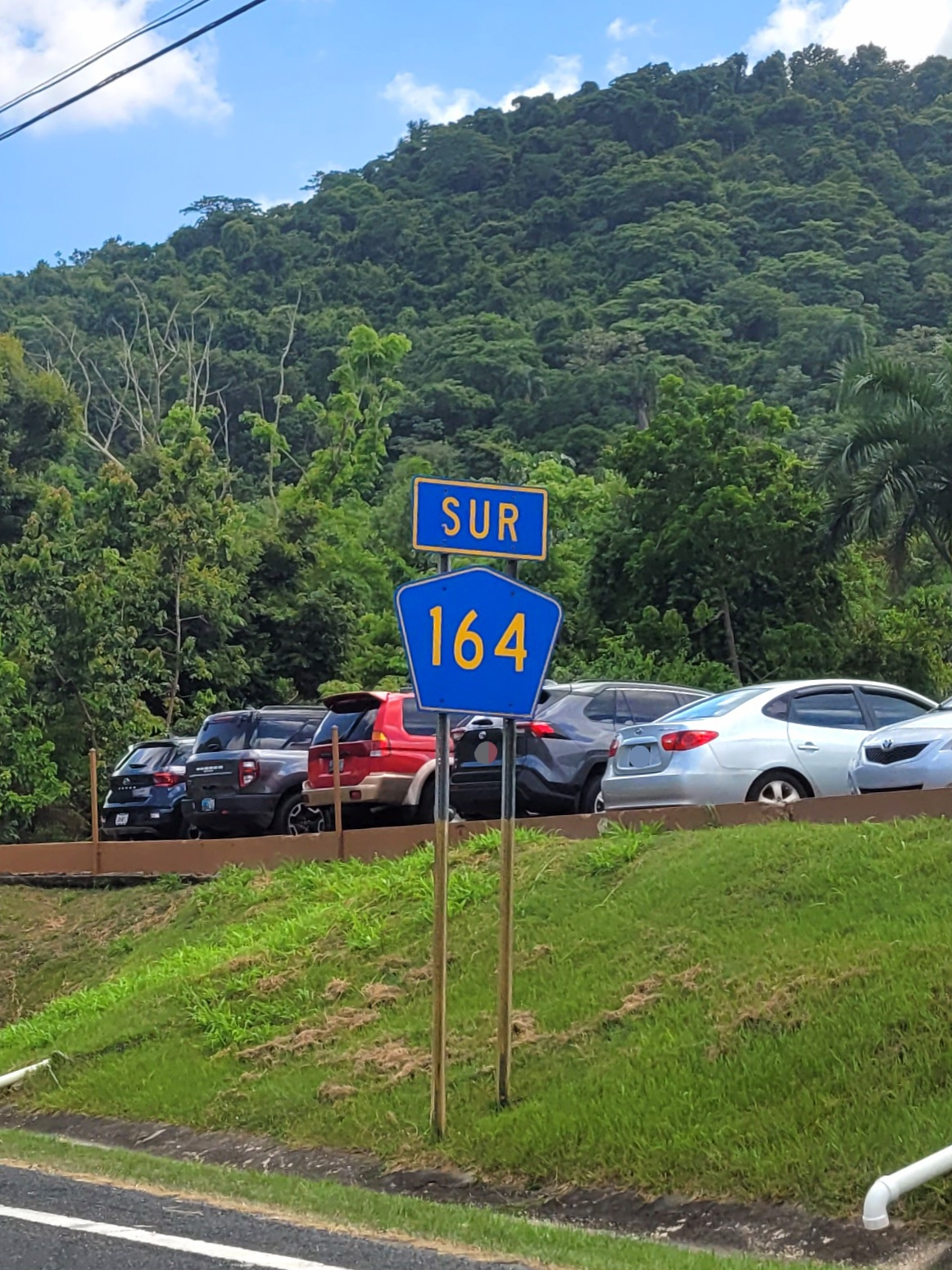
Southbound sign between Achiote and Naranjito barrio-pueblo

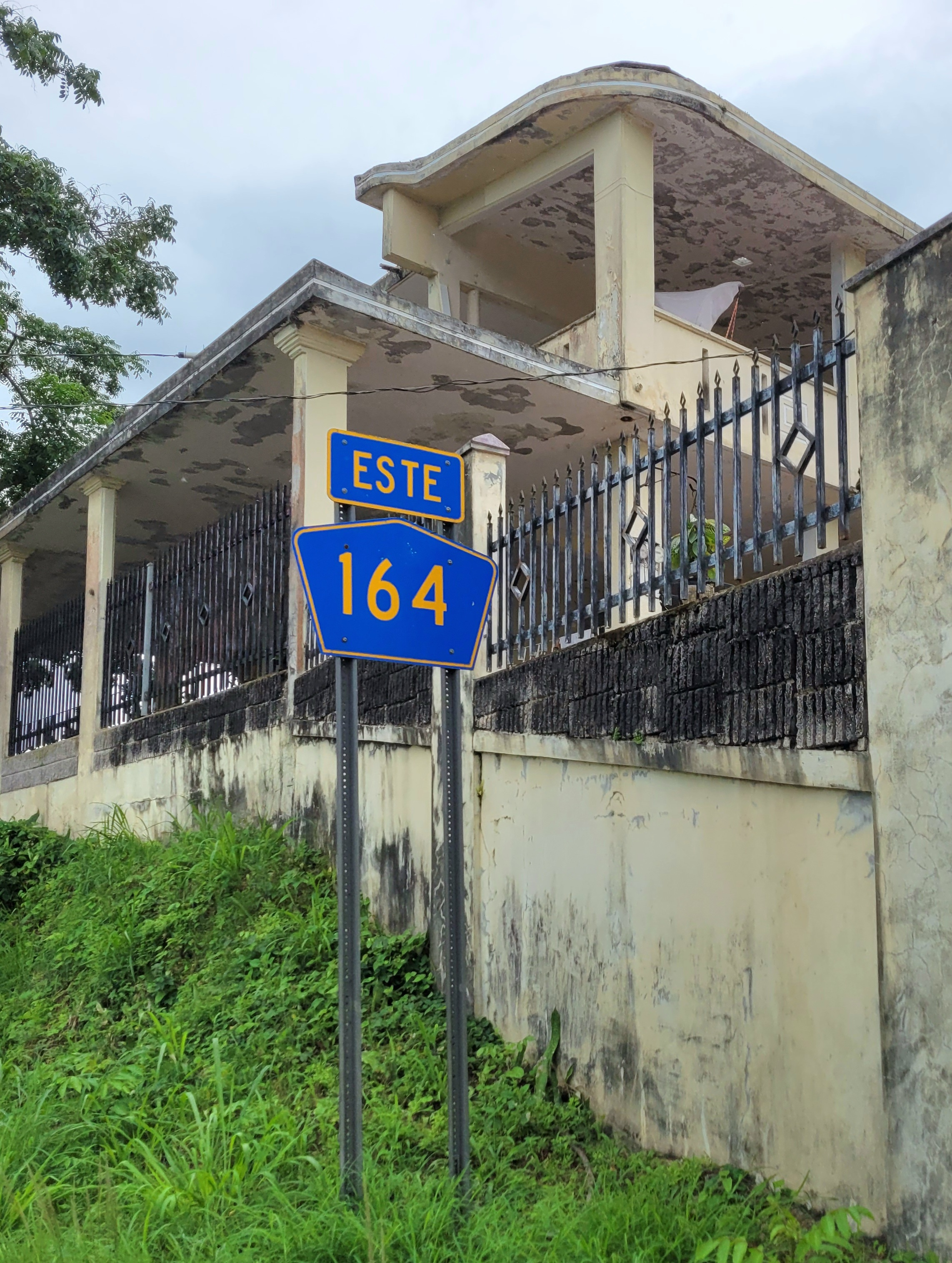
Eastbound sign in Palmarejo, Corozal

=== Rivers crossed ===
Puerto Rico Highway 164 crosses the following rivers:

- Quebrada Anones in Naranjito
- Río Cañas in Naranjito
- Río Guadiana in Naranjito
- Río Mavilla in Corozal

== History ==
The entire length of PR-164 is part of the eastern section of the old Road No. 20, a highway that led from Naranjito to Ciales through Corozal and Morovis until the 1953 Puerto Rico highway renumbering, a process implemented by the Puerto Rico Department of Transportation and Public Works (Spanish: Departamento de Transportación y Obras Públicas) that increased the insular highway network to connect existing routes with different locations around Puerto Rico. Route 20 was divided into two segments: the first one, from Naranjito to Corozal, and the second one, from Corozal to Ciales. The first section corresponds to the current PR-164 from PR-167 (old Road No. 9) to PR-159 (former Road No. 10), while the second one went to Morovis through PR-159, beginning at its junction with PR-568 (old Road No. 10) in western Corozal to continue to Ciales through PR-155, PR-633 and PR-6633 until its end at PR-6685 (former Road No. 11).

== Major intersections ==
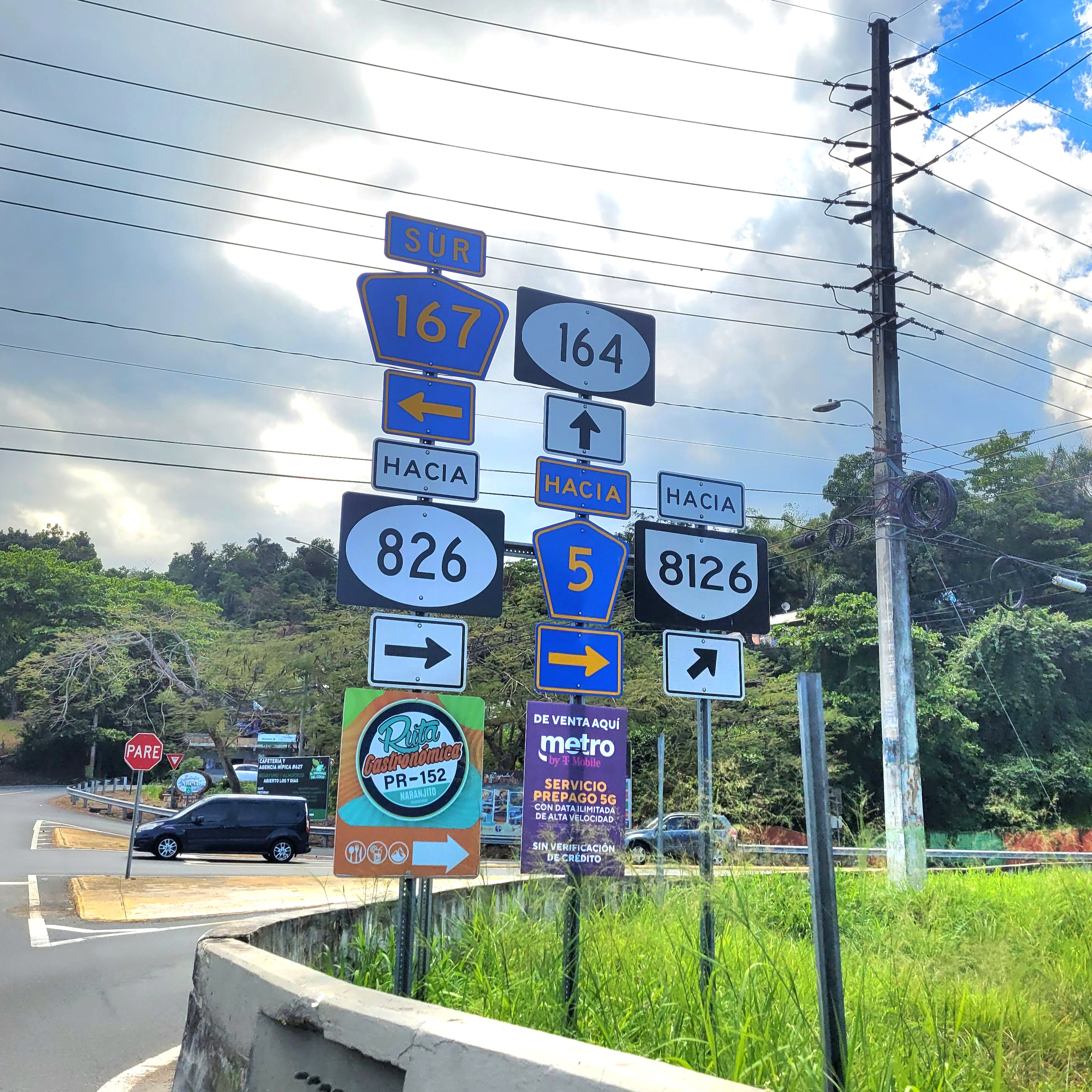
PR-167 south at PR-148 and PR-164 intersection in Barrio Nuevo, Naranjito

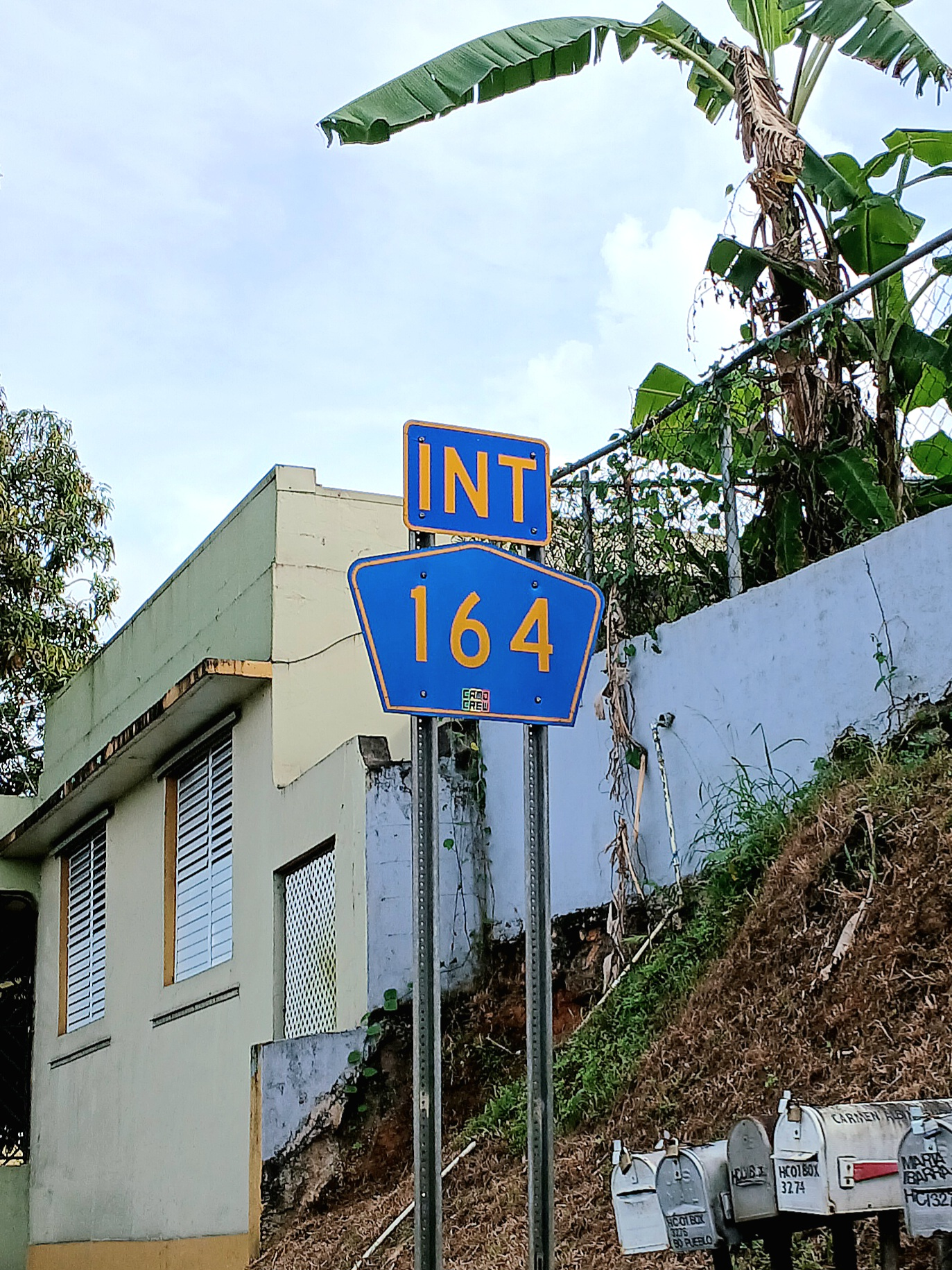
PR-159 east approaching PR-164 intersection in Barrio Pueblo, Corozal

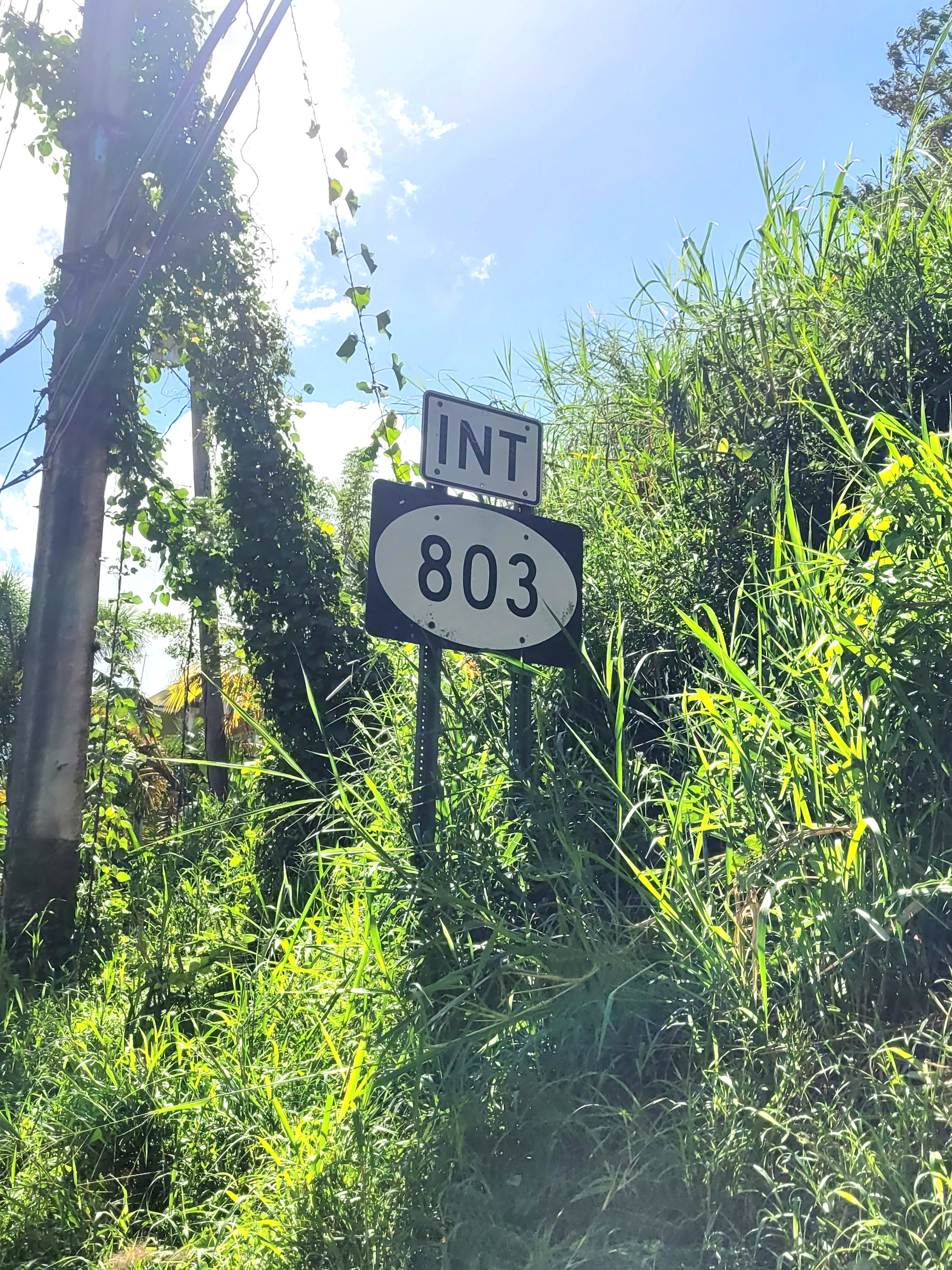
PR-164 east near the northern terminus of PR-803 in Palmarejo, Corozal

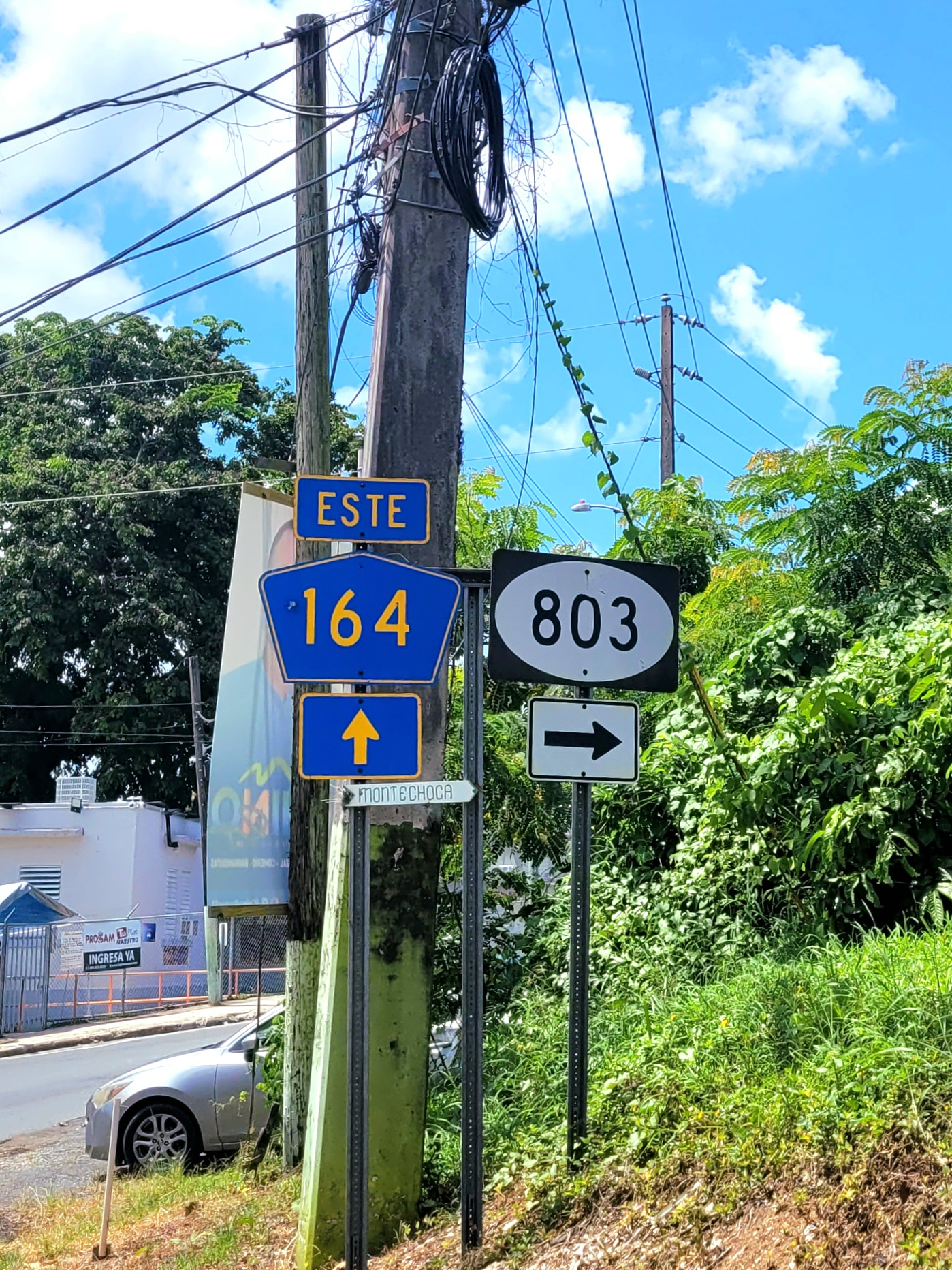
PR-164 east at PR-803 intersection in Palmarejo, Corozal

Municipality	Location	km	mi	Destinations	Notes
Corozal	Pueblo–Palmarejo line	16.4	10.2	PR-159 – Morovis, Corozal, Toa Alta	Western terminus of PR-164
Corozal	Palmarejo	13.7	8.5	PR-803 – Barranquitas	Access to Palos Blancos
Naranjito	Lomas	11.0	6.8	PR-8811 – Lomas	
Naranjito	Lomas	10.9– 10.8	6.8– 6.7	PR-811 – Cedro Abajo	
Naranjito	Lomas	9.8	6.1	PR-165 – Toa Baja, Bayamón	Access to Toa Alta
Naranjito	Achiote	7.7	4.8	PR-884 – Achiote	
Naranjito	Achiote–Naranjito barrio-pueblo line	6.4– 6.3 (Note: PR-164 kilometer markers are interrupted on Desvío Mariano Cotto.)	4.0– 3.9	PR-810 – Higuillales	
Naranjito	Achiote–Naranjito barrio-pueblo line	6.4– 6.3	4.0– 3.9	PR-152 south – Barranquitas	Southern terminus of PR-5 concurrency
Naranjito	Achiote–Naranjito barrio-pueblo line	6.4– 6.3	4.0– 3.9	PR-5 south (Desvío Mariano Cotto) – Corozal, Barranquitas	Northern terminus of PR-5 concurrency
Naranjito	Naranjito barrio-pueblo	6.1	3.8	To PR-5 (Desvío Mariano Cotto) / PR-Calle Marcelino Cruz Cosme – Bayamón	
Naranjito	Naranjito barrio-pueblo	5.9	3.7	PR-825 – Achiote	
Naranjito	Nuevo	4.9	3.0	PR-147 to PR-5 (Desvío Mariano Cotto) – Naranjito	Former highway
Naranjito	Nuevo	2.9	1.8	PR-815 – Nuevo	
Naranjito	Nuevo	0.7	0.43	PR-8126 – Guadiana	Former PR-826
Naranjito	Nuevo	0.0	0.0	PR-148 north / PR-167 to PR-826 – Naranjito, Bayamón, Comerío, Guadiana	Eastern terminus of PR-164
1.000 mi = 1.609 km; 1.000 km = 0.621 mi: Concurrency terminus
