= Puerto Rico Highway 148 =

Highway in Puerto Rico

Highway 148
- Ruta 148

Route information
- Maintained by Puerto Rico DTPW
- Length: 0.8 km (0.50 mi; 2,600 ft)

Major junctions
- South end: PR-164 / PR-167 in Nuevo
- PR-8126 in Guadiana
- North end: PR-5 / PR-826 in Guadiana

Location
- Country: United States
- Territory: Puerto Rico
- Municipalities: Naranjito

Highway system
- Roads in Puerto Rico; List
← PR-147	→ PR-149

Puerto Rico Highway 148 (PR-148) is a short north–south road that connects from PR-5 to PR-167 in Naranjito, Puerto Rico. This highway is located between Guadiana and Barrio Nuevo, in eastern Naranjito.

== Route description ==
The bypass goes to Comerío and Guadiana barrio from PR-5 because PR-167 between Bayamón and Naranjito has many curves. Originally PR-148 also ran to west from its junction with PR-5 and PR-826 to the former PR-147 near the downtown Naranjito to improve the access from the east because PR-164, like PR-167, has many curves in Barrio Nuevo area. Actually the former PR-147 and the east–west section of this route is now part of PR-5.

Puerto Rico Highway 148

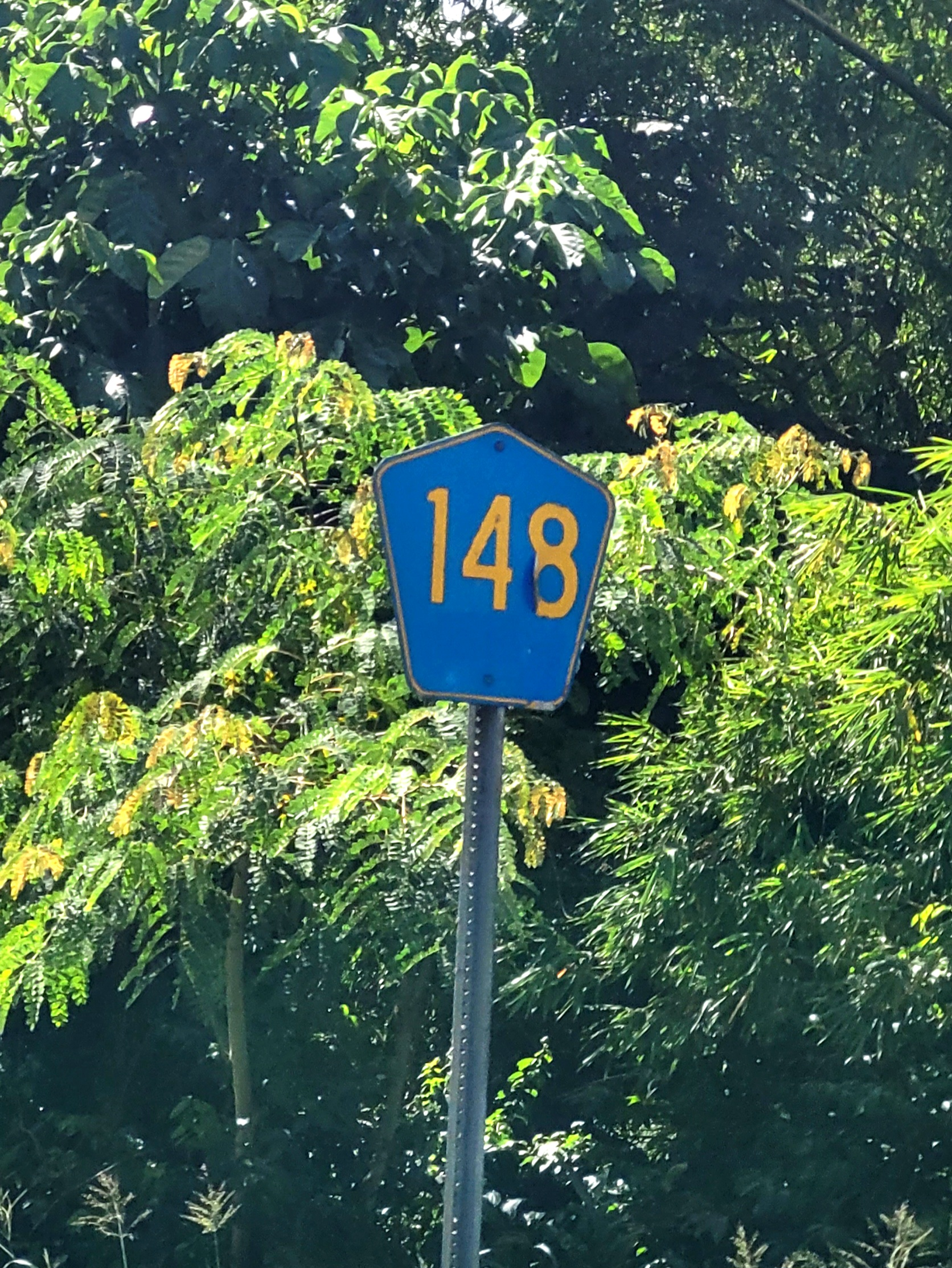
Northbound sign in Barrio Nuevo

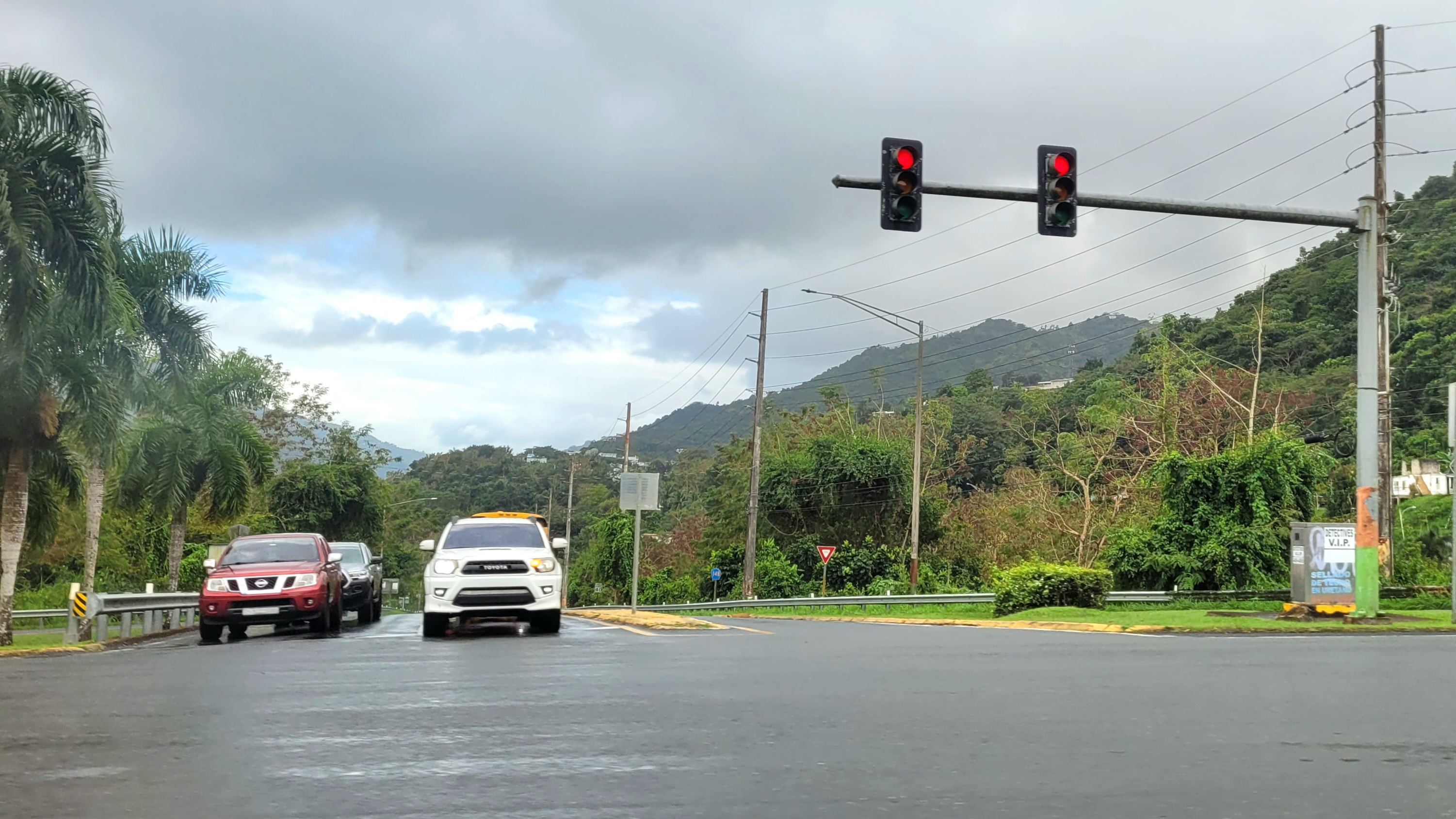
Northern terminus in Guadiana barrio

== Major intersections ==
The entire route is located in Naranjito.

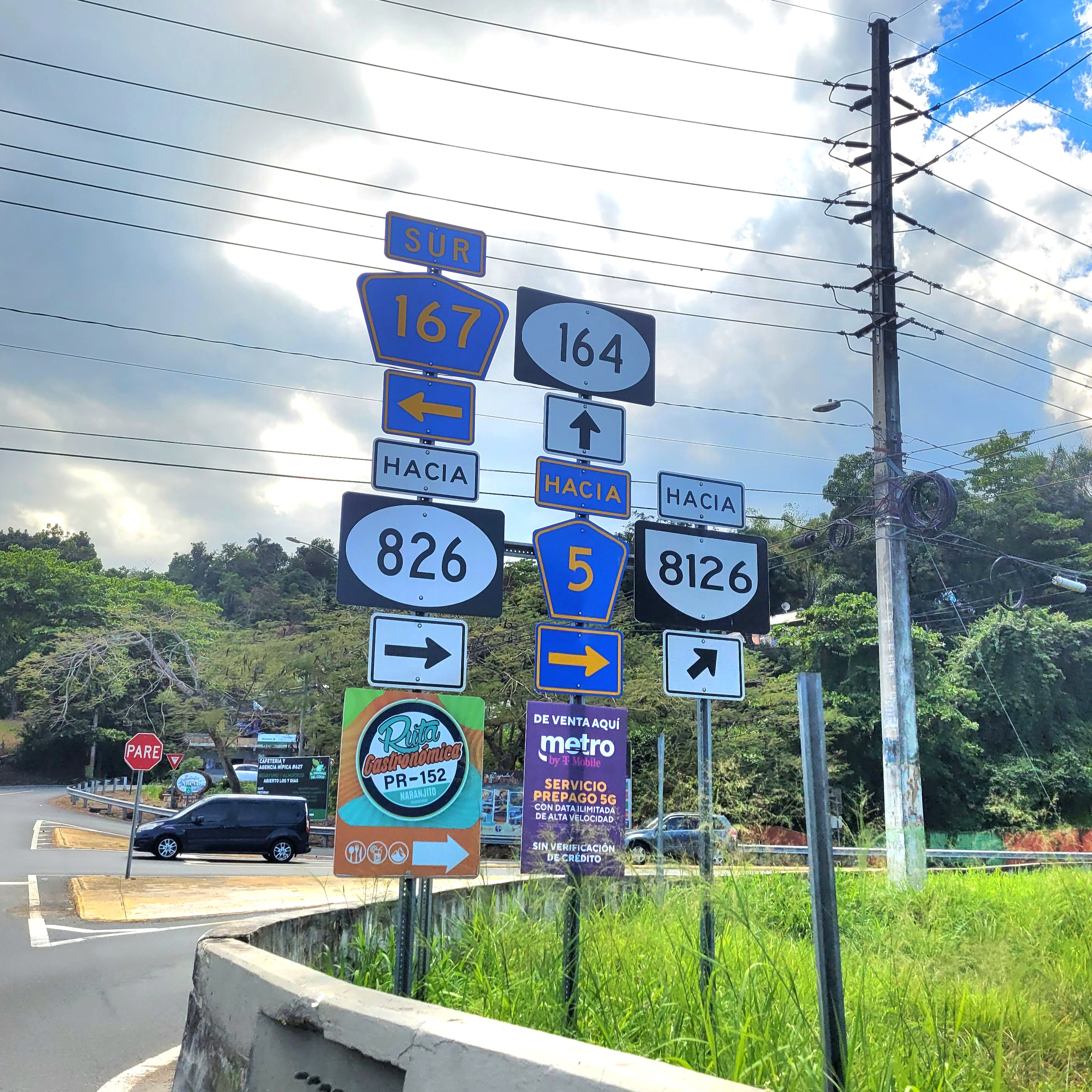
PR-167 south at PR-148 and PR-164 intersection in Barrio Nuevo

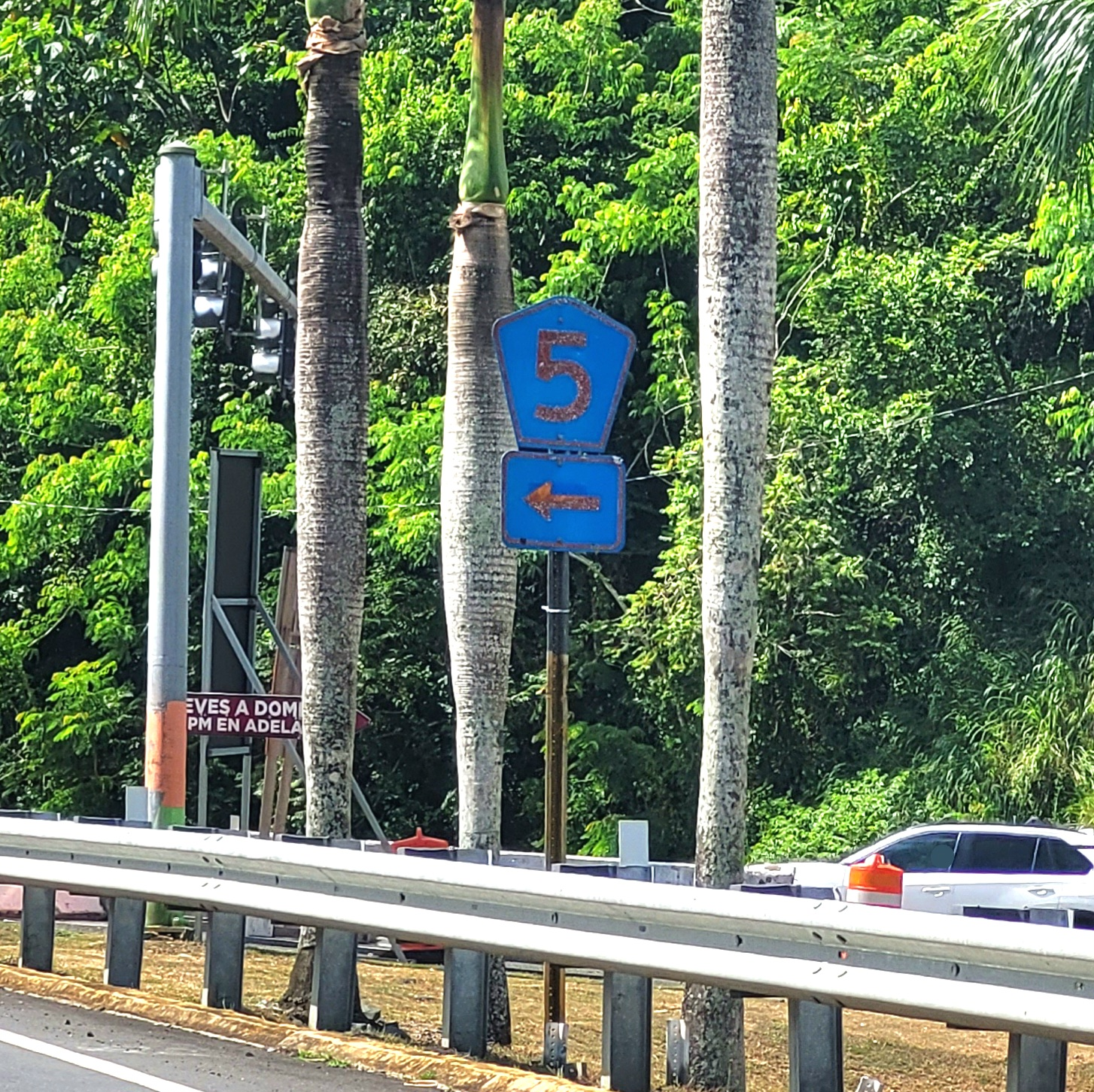
PR-148 north at PR-5 and PR-826 intersection in Guadiana barrio

Location	km	mi	Destinations	Notes
Nuevo	0.0	0.0	PR-164 / PR-167 – Naranjito, Bayamón, Comerío	Southern terminus of PR-148
Guadiana	0.5	0.31	PR-8126 – Sector Entrada Guadiana	Former PR-826
Guadiana	0.8	0.50	PR-5 (Desvío Mariano Cotto) – Naranjito, Bayamón	Northern terminus of PR-148 and southern terminus of PR-826
Guadiana	0.8	0.50	PR-826 – Guadiana	Continuation beyond PR-5
1.000 mi = 1.609 km; 1.000 km = 0.621 mi
