= Puerto Rico Highway 147 =

Highway in Puerto Rico

Highway 147
- Ruta 147

Route information
- Maintained by Puerto Rico DTPW
- Length: 2.1 km (1.3 mi)

Major junctions
- West end: PR-152 / PR-164 in Achiote–Naranjito barrio-pueblo
- PR-825 in Achiote; PR-148 in Guadiana
- East end: PR-164 in Nuevo

Location
- Country: United States
- Territory: Puerto Rico
- Municipalities: Naranjito

Highway system
- Roads in Puerto Rico; List
← PR-146	→ PR-148

Puerto Rico Highway 147 (PR-147) is now the PR-5 in Naranjito, Puerto Rico. This highway was extended from PR-164, west of downtown Naranjito, to PR-148, east of downtown area.

== Route description ==
Puerto Rico Highway 147 was a bypass that served as an alternate route for PR-164 to avoiding downtown Naranjito. The entire route, which is the current PR-5, has two lanes per direction, and passes through Achiote, Guadiana and Barrio Nuevo.

== History ==
The former PR-147 ran from its intersection with PR-164 to former east–west portion of PR-148 (current PR-5), as a bypass to the north part of downtown area. After extending the PR-5 number from Bayamón to Naranjito, the PR-147 numbering was decommissioned, leaving an unsigned portion between PR-5 and PR-164 in the east of downtown.

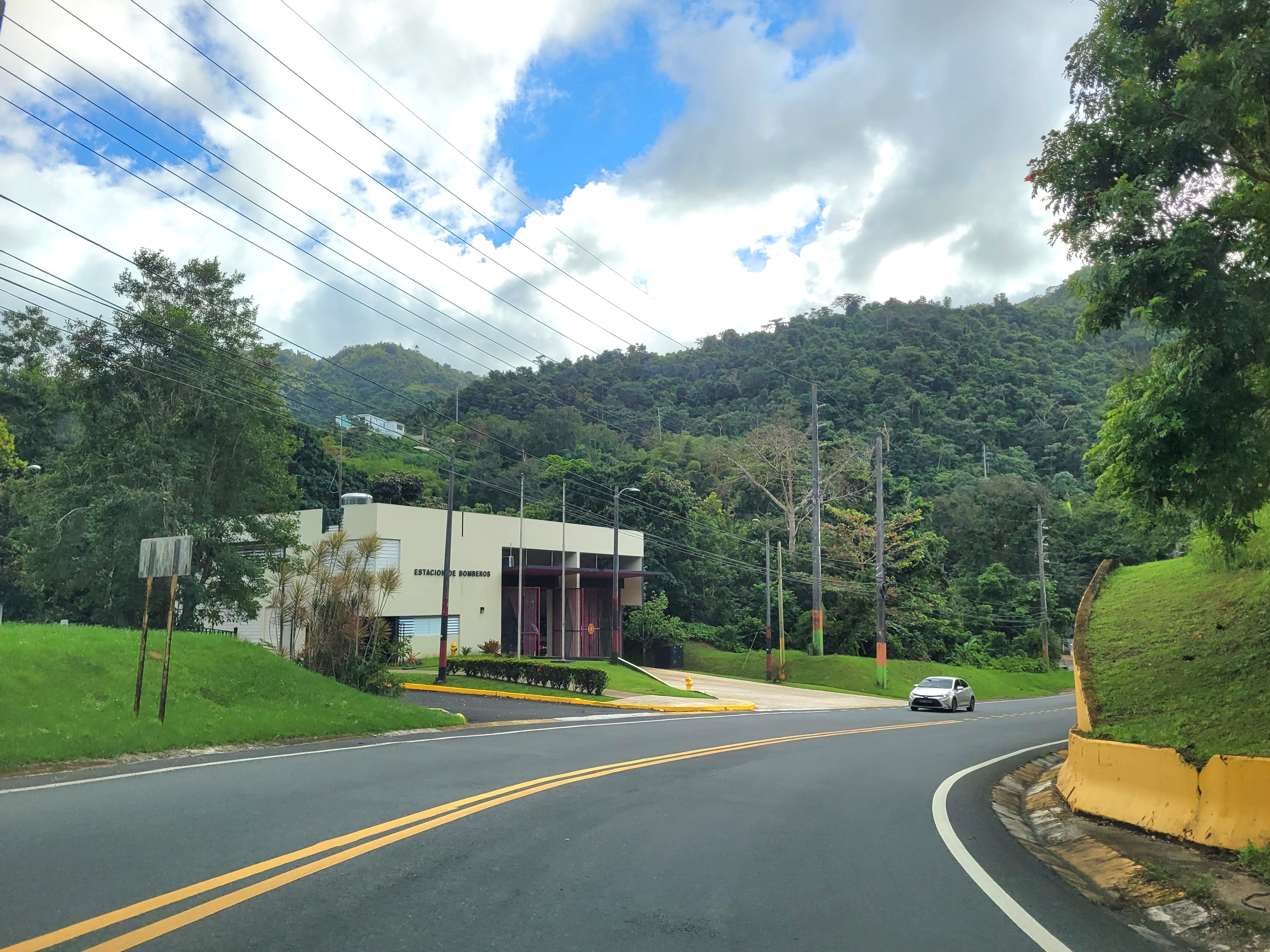
Former Puerto Rico Highway 147 in Guadiana

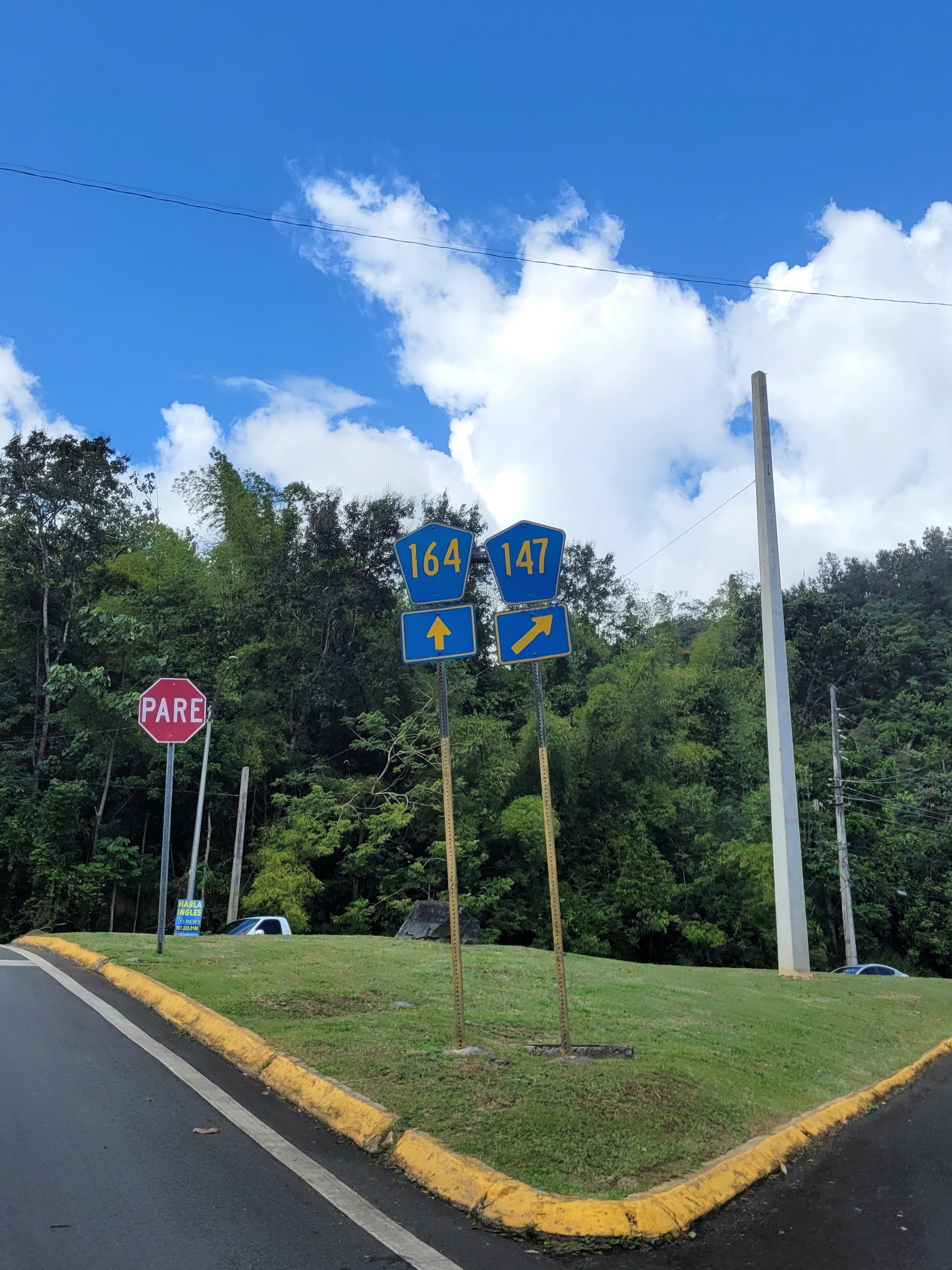
PR-164 at its junction with the former PR-147

== Major intersections ==
The entire route was located in Naranjito.

Location	km	mi	Destinations	Notes
Achiote–Naranjito barrio-pueblo line	2.1	1.3	PR-152 south – Barranquitas	Continuation beyond PR-164
Achiote–Naranjito barrio-pueblo line	2.1	1.3	PR-164 west – Corozal	Western terminus of PR-147 and northern terminus of PR-152; southern terminus of PR-164 concurrency
Achiote–Naranjito barrio-pueblo line	1.9	1.2	PR-164 east (Calle Georgetti Fas) – Naranjito	Northern terminus of PR-164 concurrency
Naranjito barrio-pueblo	1.7	1.1	To PR-164 east (Calle Georgetti Fas) / PR-Calle Marcelino Cruz Cosme – Naranjito	
Achiote	1.2	0.75	PR-825 – Naranjito, Achiote	
Guadiana	0.3– 0.2	0.19– 0.12	PR-148 east – Bayamón, Comerío	
Nuevo	0.0	0.0	PR-164 – Naranjito, Nuevo	Eastern terminus of PR-147
1.000 mi = 1.609 km; 1.000 km = 0.621 mi: Concurrency terminus
