= Lomas, Naranjito, Puerto Rico =

Barrio of Puerto Rico

Lomas
- Barrio
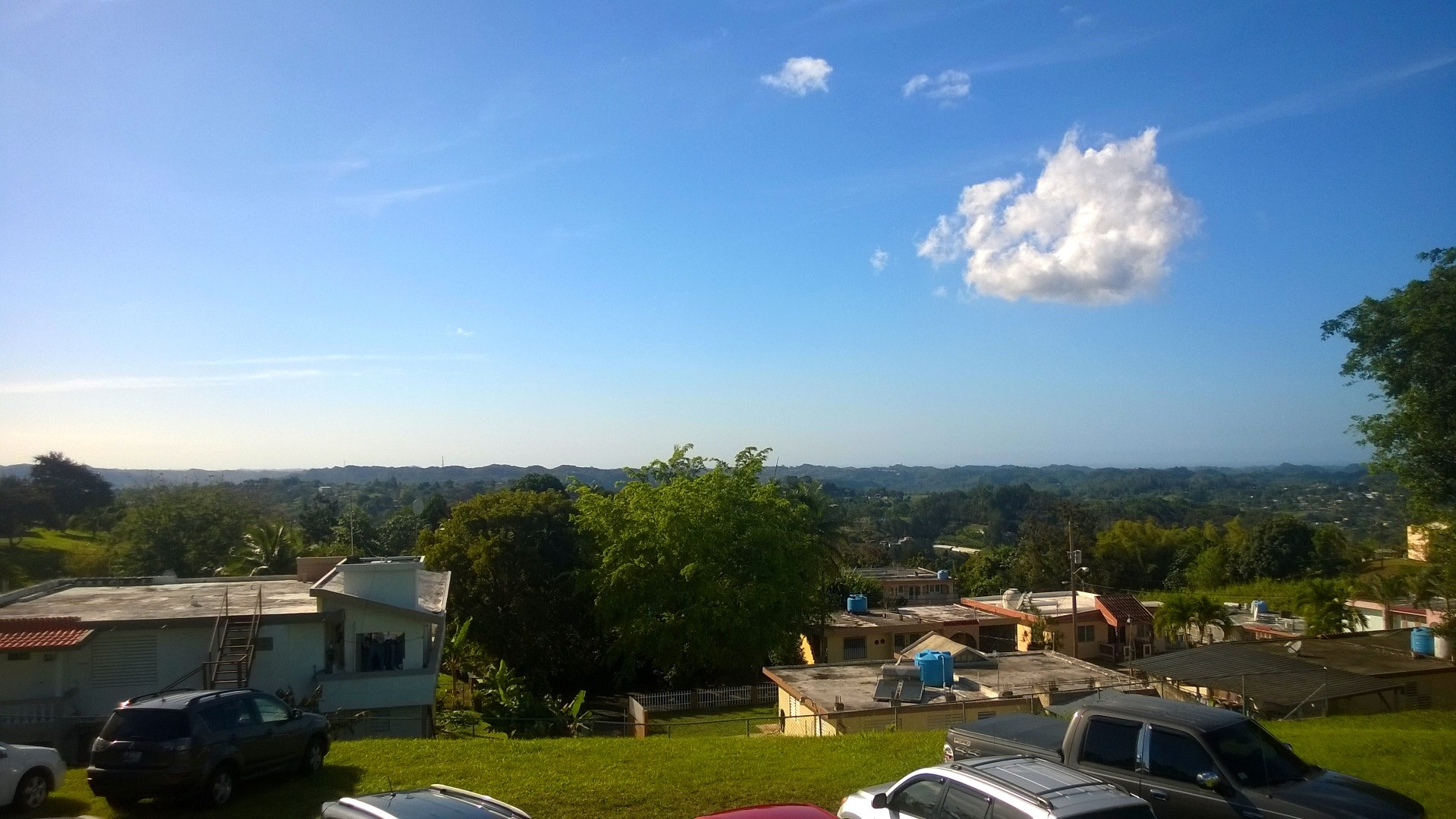
- View from Lomas

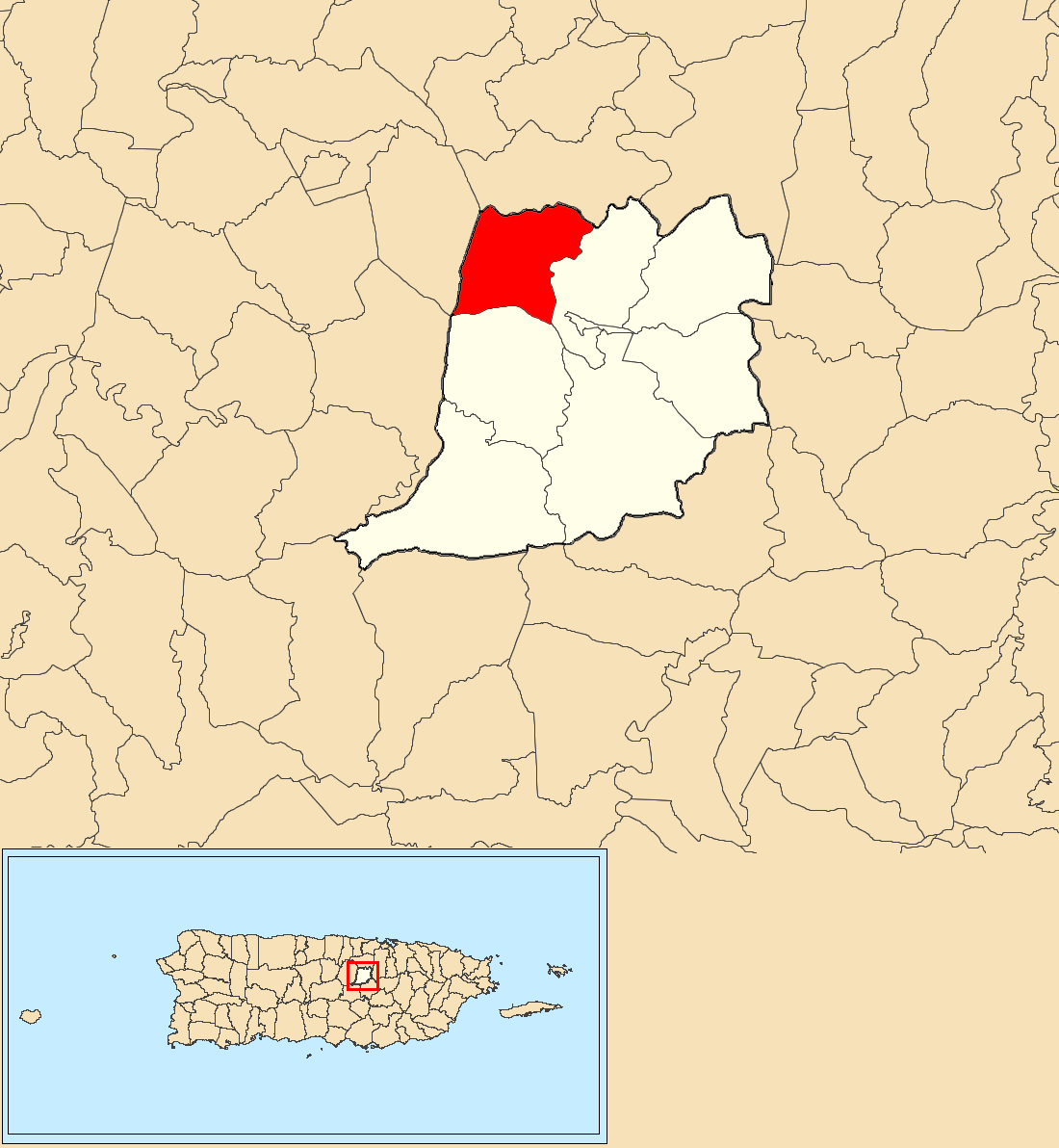
- Location of Lomas within the municipality of Naranjito shown in red

- Location of Puerto Rico
- Coordinates: 18°18′57″N 66°16′08″W
- Commonwealth: Puerto Rico
- Municipality: Naranjito

Area
  - Total: 2.92 sq mi (7.6 km^{2})
  - Land: 2.92 sq mi (7.6 km^{2})
  - Water: 0 sq mi (0 km^{2})
- Elevation: 728 ft (222 m)

Population (2010)
  - Total: 3,865
  - Density: 1,323.6/sq mi (511.0/km^{2})
- Source: 2010 Census
- Time zone: UTC−4 (AST)
- ZIP Code: 00719
- Area code: 787/939

Lomas is a barrio in the municipality of Naranjito, Puerto Rico. Its population in 2010 was 3,865.

== History ==
Lomas was in Spain's gazetteers until Puerto Rico was ceded by Spain in the aftermath of the Spanish–American War under the terms of the Treaty of Paris of 1898 and became an unincorporated territory of the United States. In 1899, the United States Department of War conducted a census of Puerto Rico finding that the population of Lomas barrio was 994.

Historical population
Census	Pop.	Note	%±
1900	994		—
1910	1,055		6.1%
1920	1,322		25.3%
1930	1,170		−11.5%
1940	1,816		55.2%
1950	2,153		18.6%
1960	2,504		16.3%
1970	2,528		1.0%
1980	3,004		18.8%
1990	3,961		31.9%
2000	4,126		4.2%
2010	3,865		−6.3%
U.S. Decennial Census; 1899 (shown as 1900) 1910-1930; 1930-1950 1980-2000 2010

== Sectors ==
Barrios (which are, in contemporary times, roughly comparable to minor civil divisions) in turn are further subdivided into smaller local populated place areas/units called sectores (sectors in English). The types of sectores may vary, from normally sector to urbanización to reparto to barriada to residencial, among others.

The following sectors are in Lomas barrio:

Lomas Jaguas, Parcelas Las Riveras (Lomas García), Sector Arturo Morales, Sector Cleto, Sector Cuchillas, Sector Cuchillas Pacheco, Sector El Cielito, Sector Flor Rivera, Sector García, Sector Guayabo, Sector La Jagua, Sector La Rueda, Sector Loma Linda, Sector Lomas Centro, Sector Lomas Vallés, Sector Matos, Sector Quiles, Sector Rafael Padilla, Sector Sico Martínez (Los Pampers), Sector Susín Vázquez, Sector Tacho Vázquez, and Sector Tavo Vázquez (Chárriez).

== Gallery ==
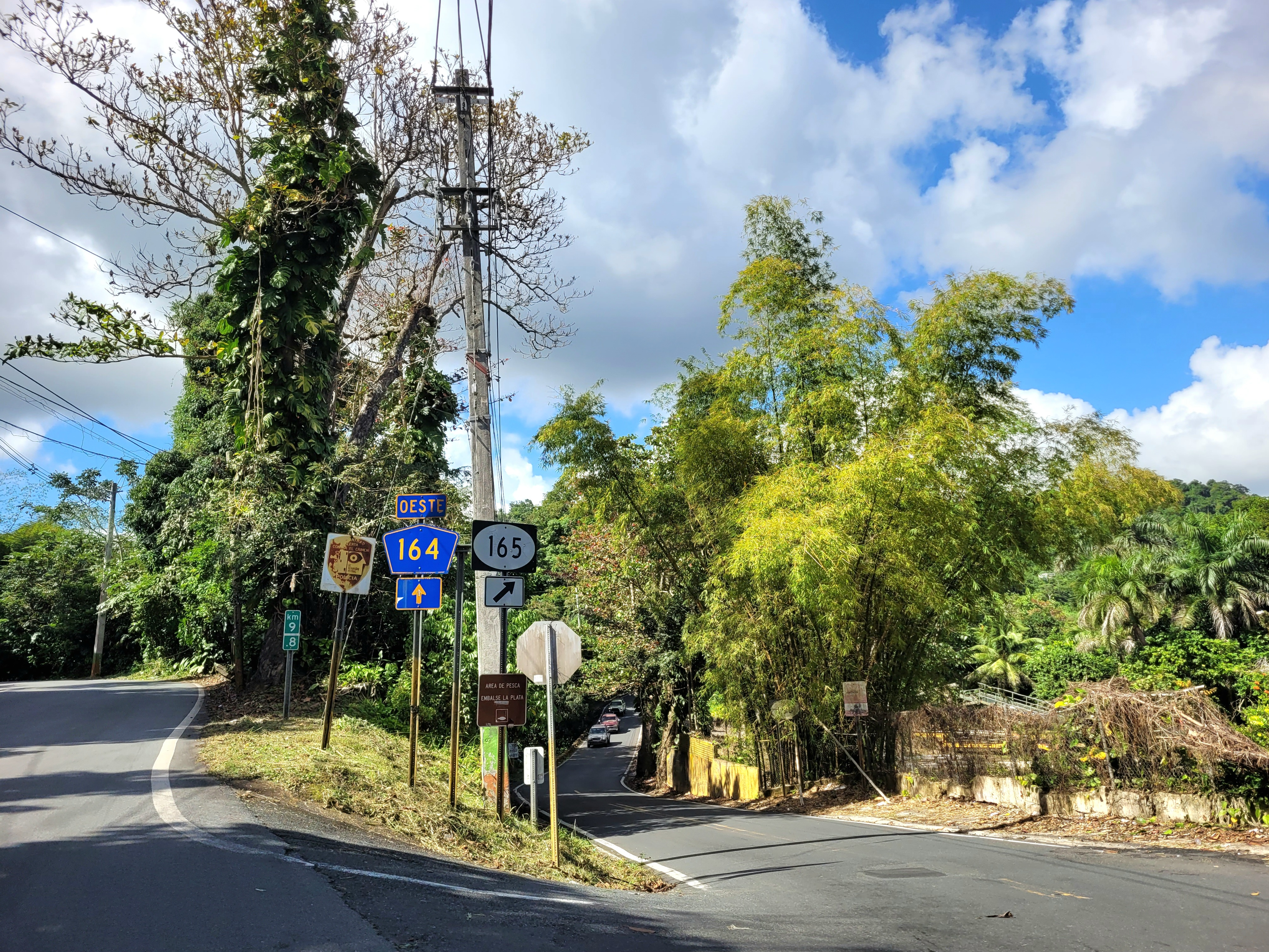
Puerto Rico Highway 164 at its junction with Puerto Rico Highway 165 in Lomas

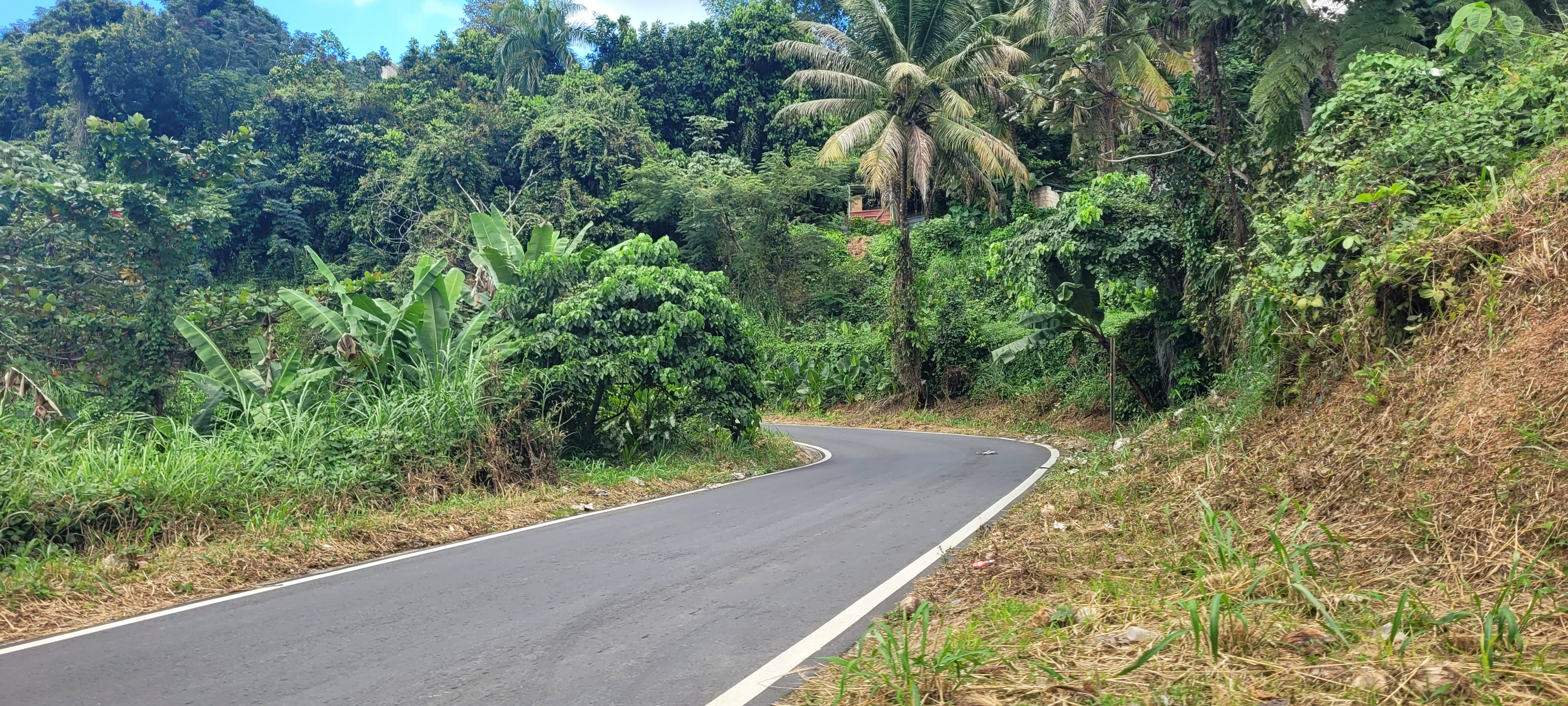
Puerto Rico Highway 8811 in Lomas

== See also ==
- List of communities in Puerto Rico
- List of barrios and sectors of Naranjito, Puerto Rico
