= Guadiana River (Puerto Rico) =

River of Puerto Rico

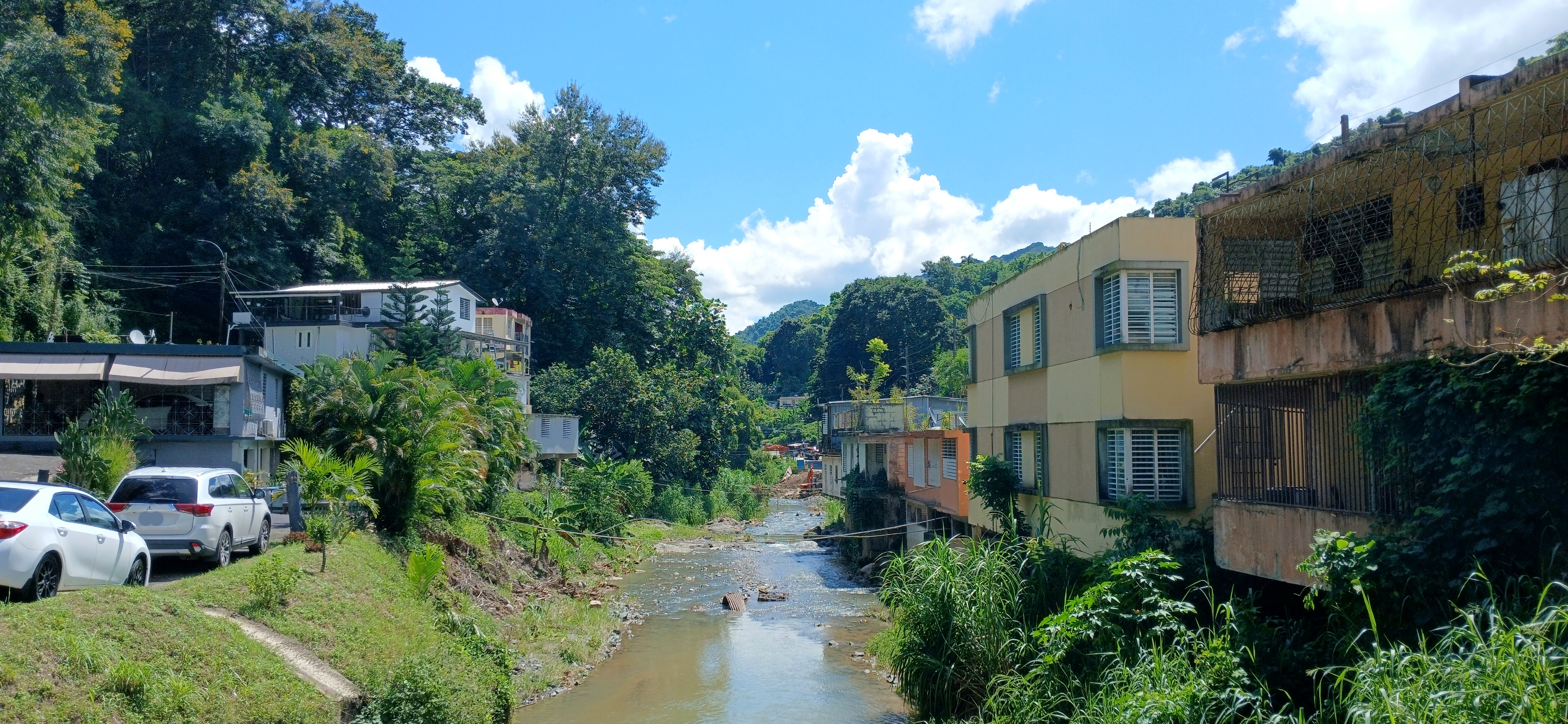
- Guadiana River in Naranjito barrio-pueblo
- Native name: Río Guadiana (Spanish)

Location
- Commonwealth: Puerto Rico
- Municipality: Naranjito

Physical characteristics
- Source
  - coordinates: 18.3235629°N 66.2318346°W
  - elevation: 151 ft

The Guadiana River (Spanish: Río Guadiana) is a river of Naranjito, Puerto Rico.

== See also ==
- List of rivers of Puerto Rico
