= Guadiana, Naranjito, Puerto Rico =

Barrio of Puerto Rico

Guadiana
- Barrio
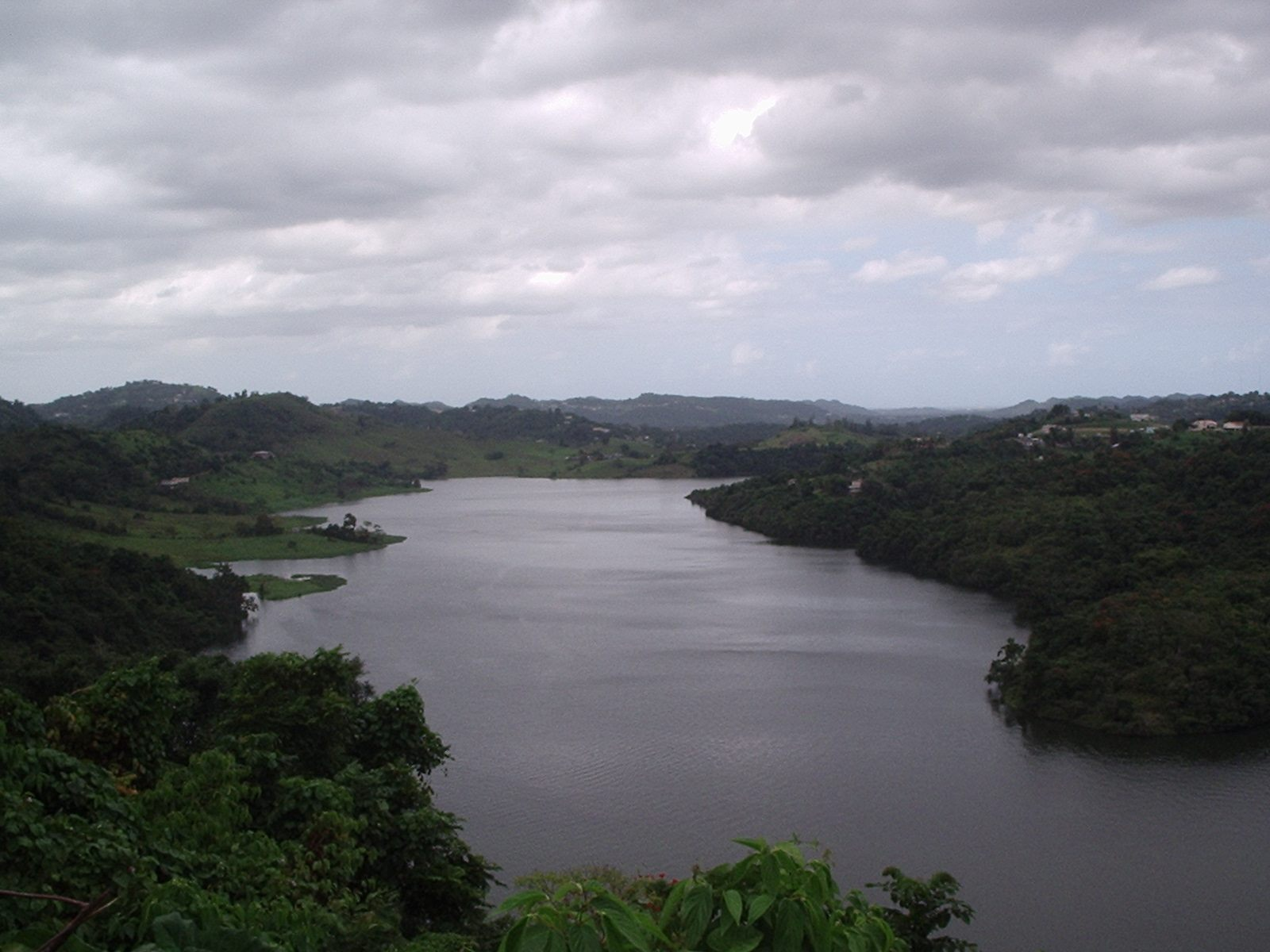
- La Plata Lake from Guadiana

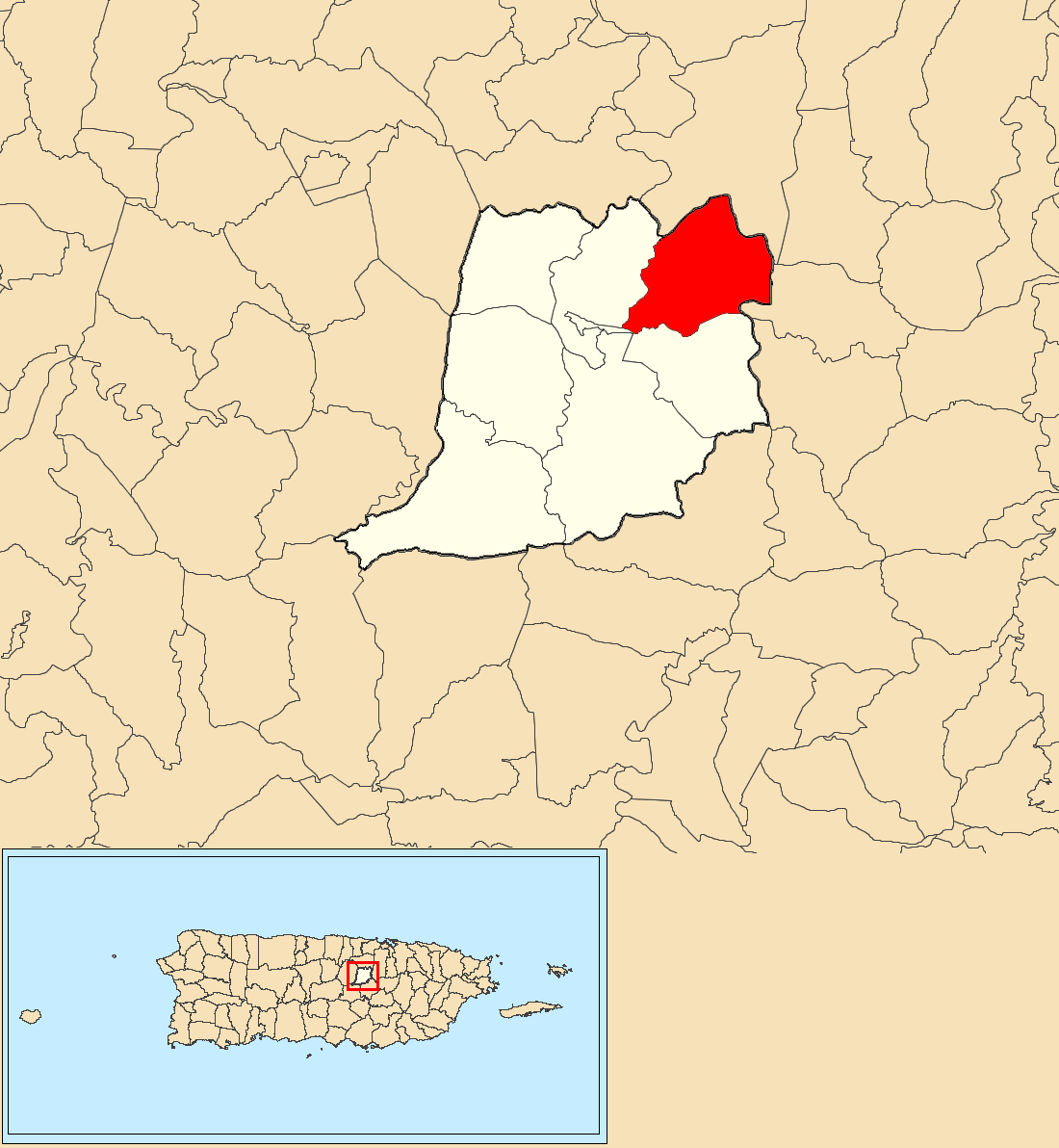
- Location of Guadiana within the municipality of Naranjito shown in red

- Location of Puerto Rico
- Coordinates: 18°18′53″N 66°13′23″W
- Commonwealth: Puerto Rico
- Municipality: Naranjito

Area
  - Total: 3.51 sq mi (9.1 km^{2})
  - Land: 3.27 sq mi (8.5 km^{2})
  - Water: 0.24 sq mi (0.62 km^{2})
- Elevation: 266 ft (81 m)

Population (2010)
  - Total: 3,978
  - Density: 1,216.5/sq mi (469.7/km^{2})
- Source: 2010 Census
- Time zone: UTC−4 (AST)
- ZIP Code: 00719
- Area code: 787/939

Guadiana is a barrio in the municipality of Naranjito, Puerto Rico. Its population in 2010 was 3,978.

== History ==
Guadiana was in Spain's gazetteers until Puerto Rico was ceded by Spain in the aftermath of the Spanish–American War under the terms of the Treaty of Paris of 1898 and became an unincorporated territory of the United States. In 1899, the United States Department of War conducted a census of Puerto Rico finding that the population of Guadiana barrio was 1,006.

Historical population
Census	Pop.	Note	%±
1900	1,006		—
1910	1,267		25.9%
1920	1,516		19.7%
1930	1,701		12.2%
1940	1,924		13.1%
1950	2,010		4.5%
1960	1,993		−0.8%
1970	0		−100.0%
1980	3,248		—
1990	4,103		26.3%
2000	3,931		−4.2%
2010	3,978		1.2%
U.S. Decennial Census; 1899 (shown as 1900) 1910-1930; 1930-1950 1980-2000 2010

== Sectors ==
Barrios (which are, in contemporary times, roughly comparable to minor civil divisions) in turn are further subdivided into smaller local populated place areas/units called sectores (sectors in English). The types of sectores may vary, from normally sector to urbanización to reparto to barriada to residencial, among others.

The following sectors are in Guadiana barrio:

Camino Lico Cruz, Camino Moncho Pagán, Camino Pascual Rivera, Comunidad Lago La Plata, El Cuco, Guadiana Alto, La Hueca, Sector Alejandro (Entrada a Guadiana), Sector Anselmo Cabrera, Sector Cabrera, Sector Colón, Sector Cuesta Las Abejas, Sector Guadiana Chinea, Sector Guadiana Espinell, Sector Guadiana Ortega, Sector Hatito, Sector La Gallera, Sector Lago Verde, Sector Los Juanes, Sector Negrón, Sector Otero, and Sector Parcelas.

== Gallery ==
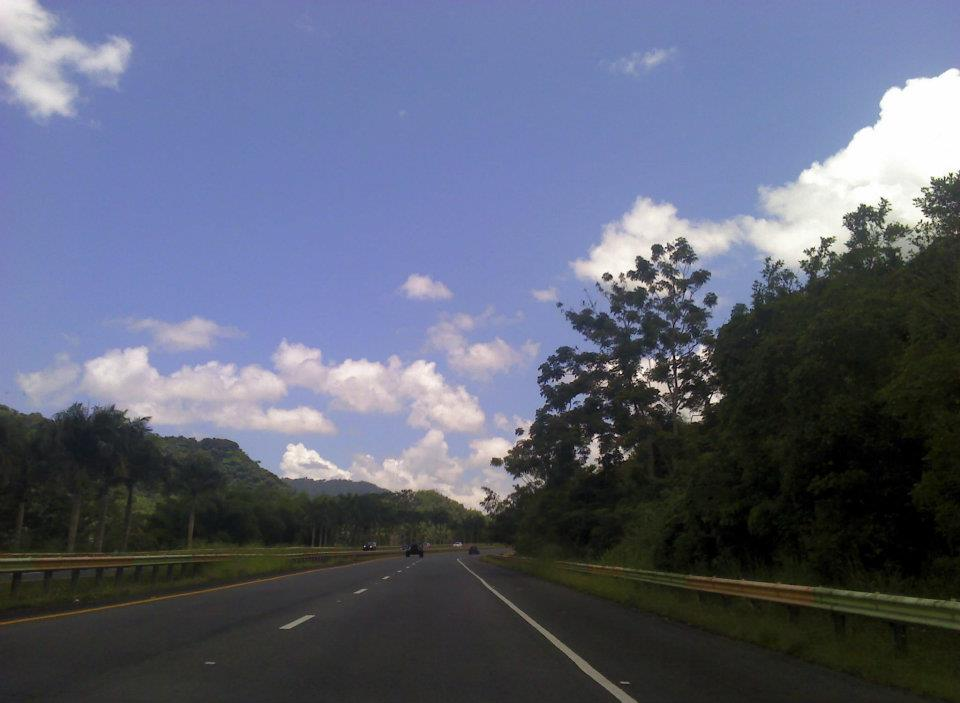
Puerto Rico Highway 5 in Guadiana

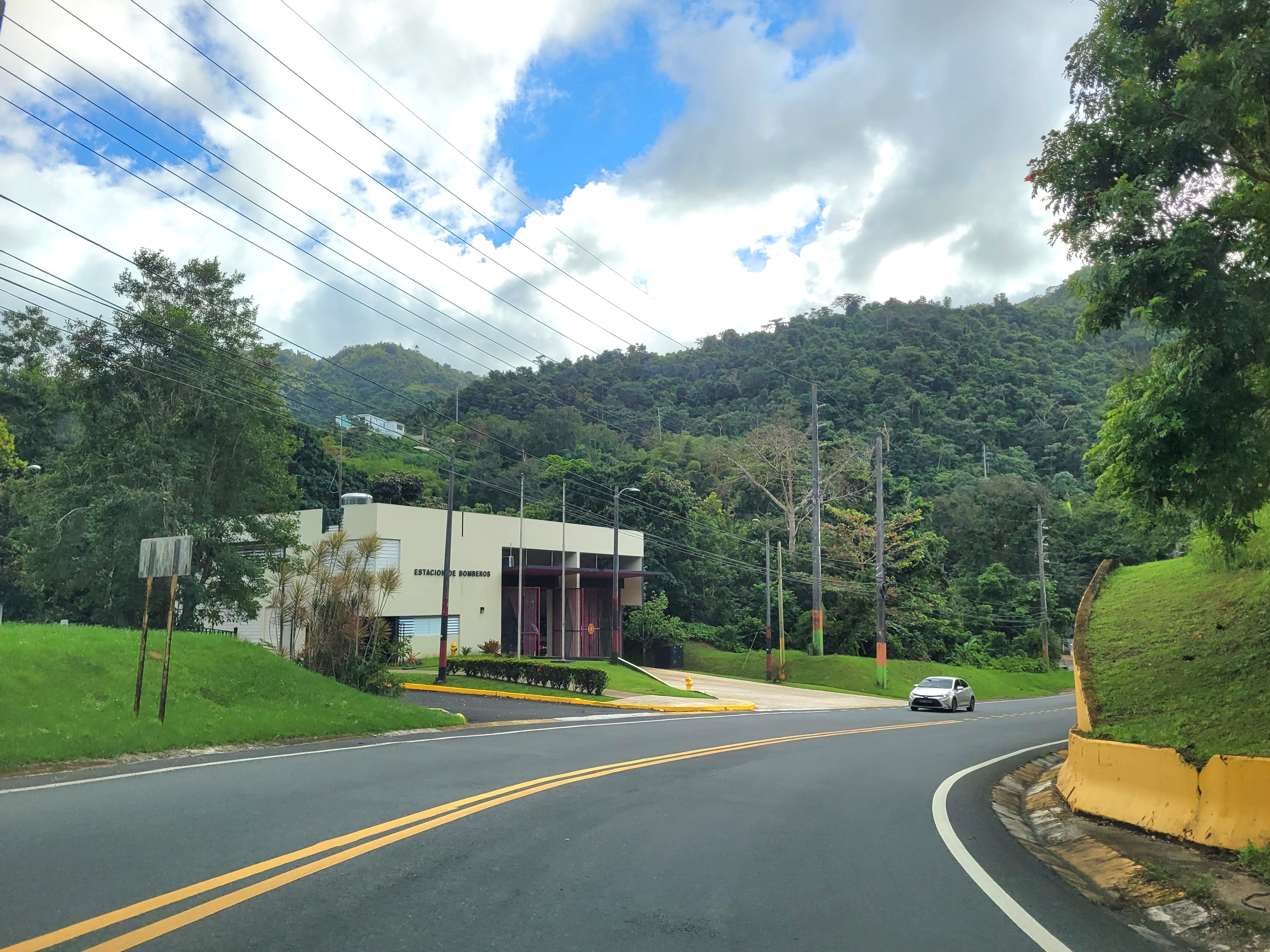
Former Puerto Rico Highway 147 in Guadiana

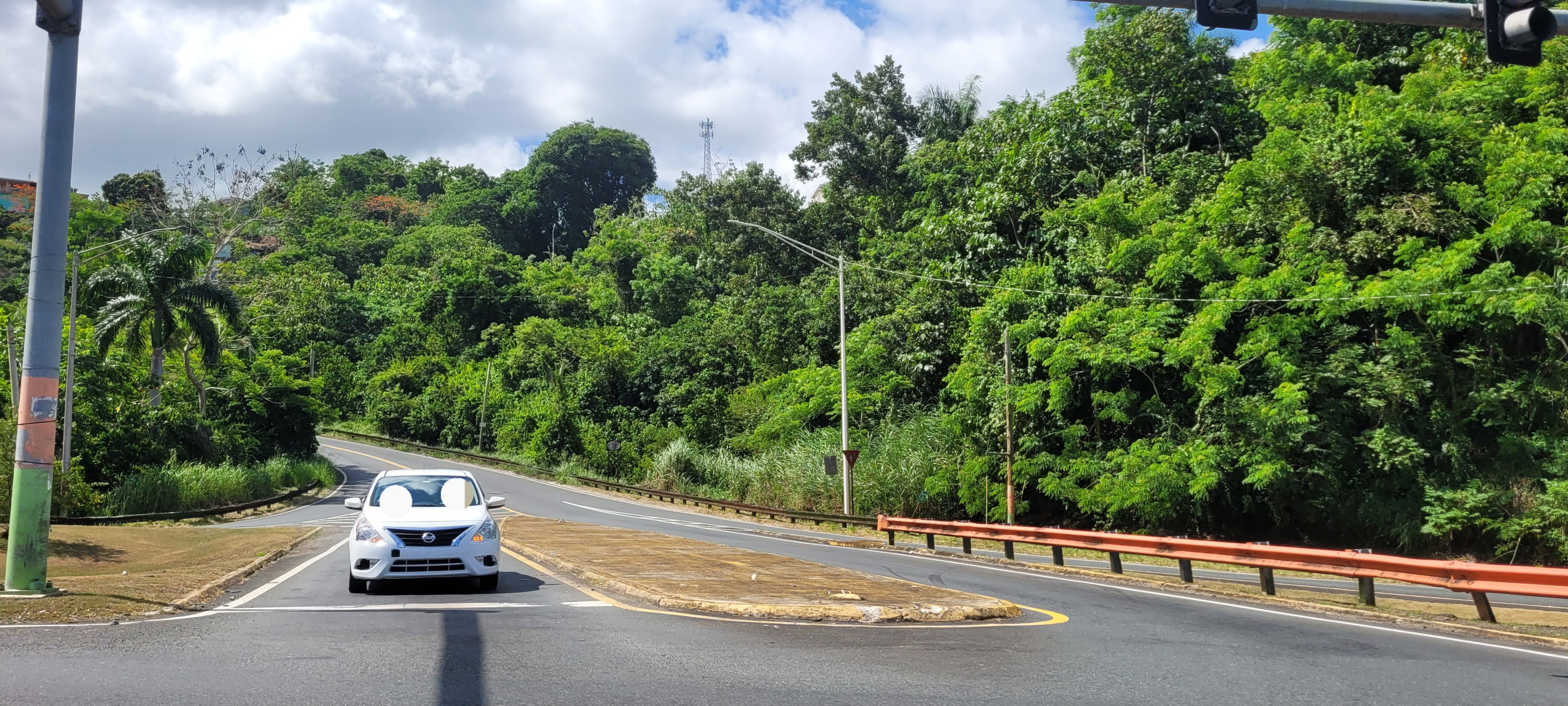
Puerto Rico Highway 826 in Guadiana

== See also ==
- List of communities in Puerto Rico
- List of barrios and sectors of Naranjito, Puerto Rico
