= Naranjito, Puerto Rico =

Town and municipality in Puerto Rico

Naranjito Municipio de Naranjito
- Town and Municipality
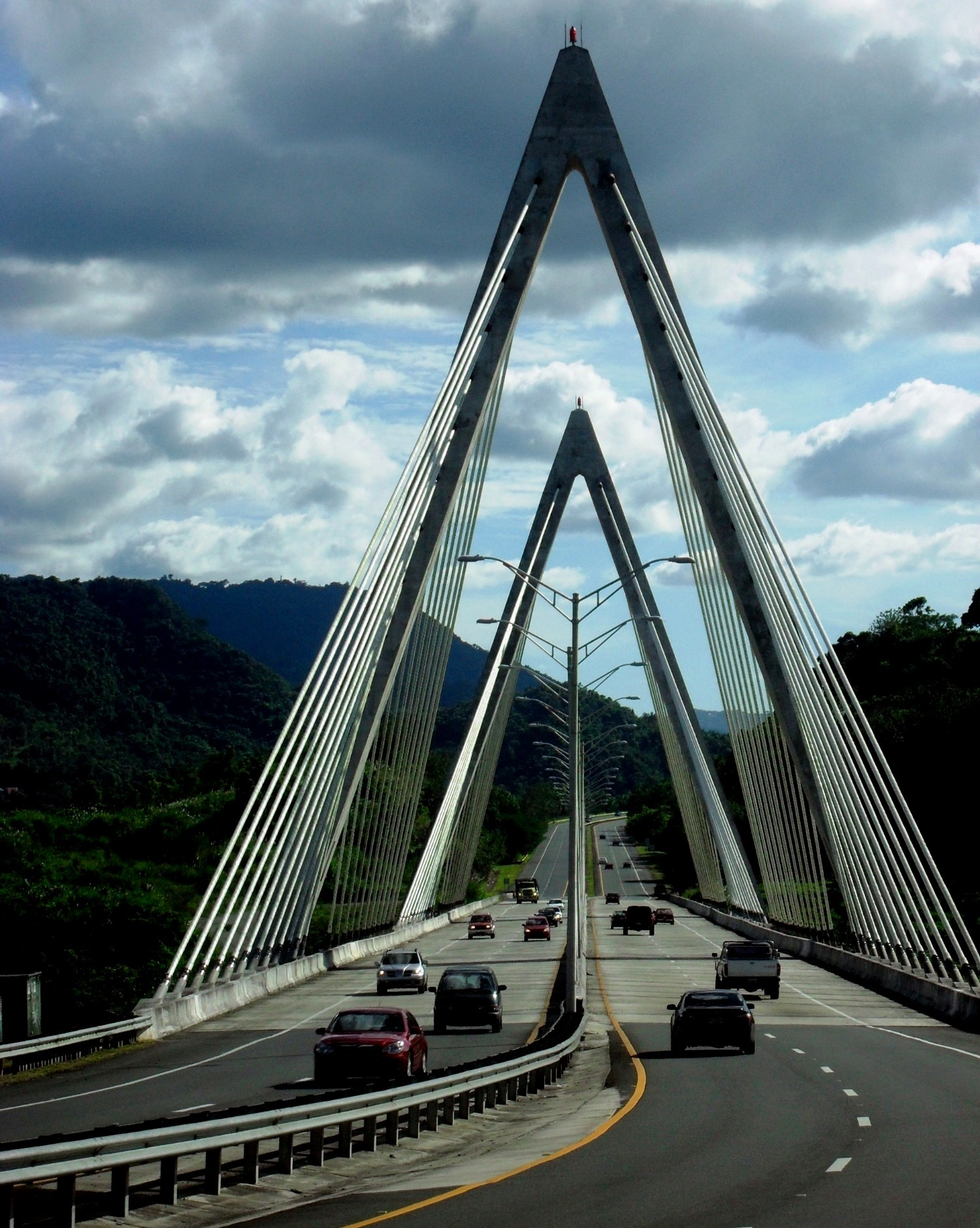
- Jesús Izcoa Moure Bridge in Naranjito

- Flag Coat of arms
- Nicknames: "La Ciudad de los Colores", "El Pueblo de los Changos"
- Motto: "Naranjito Brilla"
- Anthem: Naranjito, mi hogar predilecto
- Map of Puerto Rico highlighting Naranjito Municipality
- Coordinates: 18°18′03″N 66°14′42″W
- Sovereign state: United States
- Commonwealth: Puerto Rico
- Founded: December 3, 1824
- Founder: Braulio Morales
- Barrios: 8 barrios: Achiote; Anones; Cedro Abajo; Cedro Arriba; Guadiana; Lomas; Naranjito barrio-pueblo; Nuevo

Government
  - Mayor: Orlando Ortíz Chevres (PNP)
  - Senatorial District: VI - Guayama; Carlos J. Torres Torres (PNP)
  - Representative District: 28; Rafael Rivera Ortega (PNP)

Area
  - Total: 28.39 sq mi (73.54 km^{2})
  - Land: 28.2 sq mi (73.0 km^{2})
  - Water: 0.21 sq mi (0.54 km^{2})
- Elevation: 2,300 ft (700 m)

Population (2020)
  - Total: 29,241
  - Estimate (2025): 29,627 ▲
  - Rank: 41st in Puerto Rico
  - Density: 1,040/sq mi (401/km^{2})
- Demonym: Naranjiteños
- Time zone: UTC−4 (AST)
- ZIP Codes: 00719
- Area code: 787/939
- Website: municipiodenaranjito.com

Naranjito (Spanish pronunciation: [naɾaŋˈxito]) is a town and municipality of Puerto Rico located in the central region of the island, south of Toa Alta; north of Barranquitas and Comerío; east of Corozal; and west of Bayamón. Naranjito is spread over 7 barrios and Naranjito Pueblo (the downtown area and the administrative center). It is part of the San Juan-Caguas-Guaynabo Metropolitan Statistical Area.

== History ==
The intention to form the municipality of Naranjito began in 1810. After a series of major incidents with powerful political interests of the time, on December 3, 1824, Don Braulio Morales successfully founded the town of Naranjito. The town was founded in the neighborhood of the same name, on a land donated by Doña Manuela Rivera and Don Braulio Morales. Morales was named "Captain Settler" and at the same time was appointed mayor of the town in development. The name "Naranjito" is derived from a small sour orange tree that served as a reference point for travelers looking for in the shortest way to the town of Toa Alta. At the time of its foundation, Naranjito consisted of five barrios/districts: Lomas, Guadiana, Achiote, Nuevo and Cedro. Cedro was divided in 1853 in Cedro Arriba and Cedro Abajo. The municipality's main urban zone is composed by the San Miguel, San Antonio and San Cristobal districts.

Puerto Rico was ceded by Spain in the aftermath of the Spanish–American War under the terms of the Treaty of Paris of 1898 and became a territory of the United States. In 1899, the United States Department of War conducted a census of Puerto Rico finding that the population of Naranjito was 8,101.

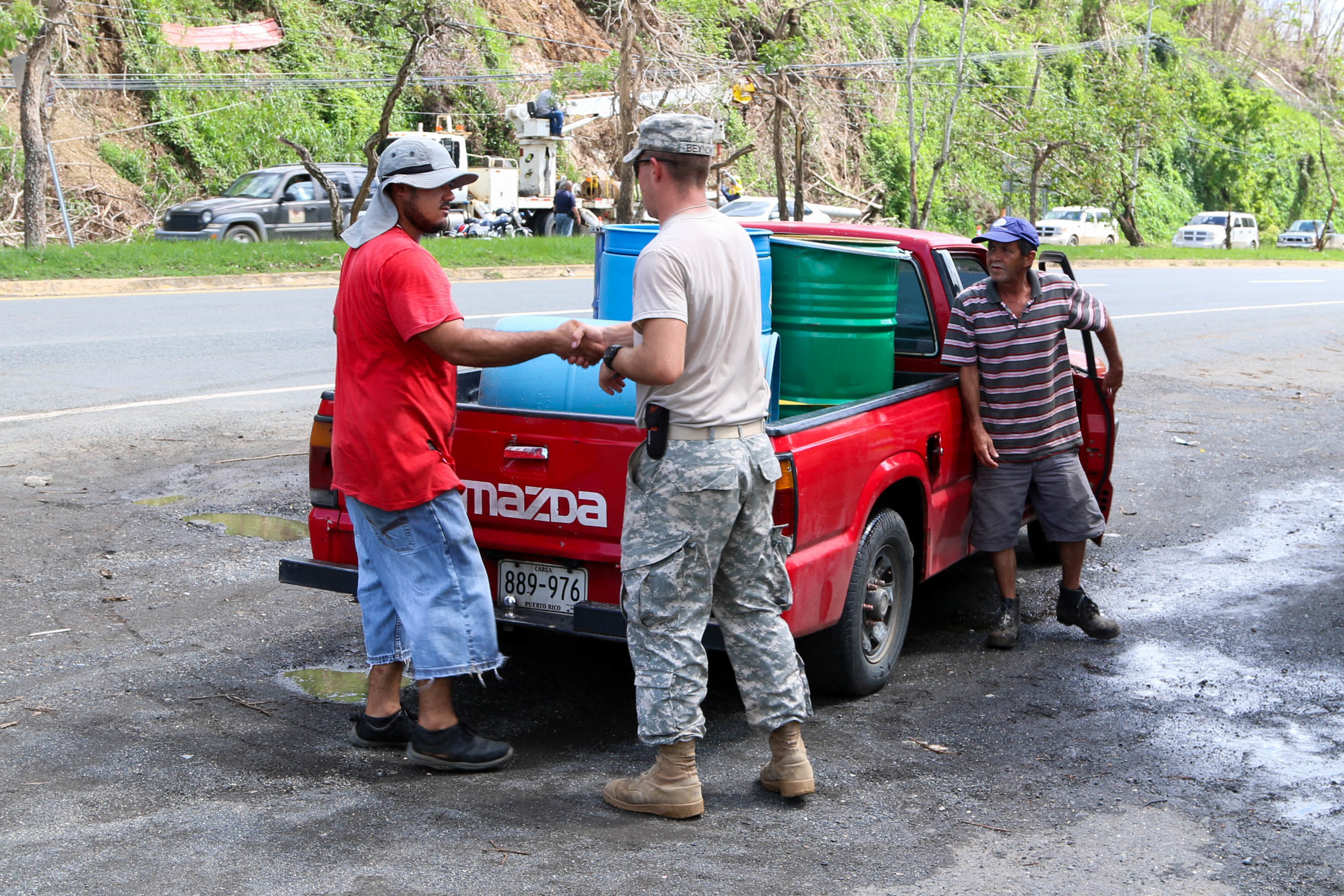
On October 11, 2017, the South Dakota National Guard distributed drinking water to residents of Naranjito.

On September 20, 2017 Hurricane Maria struck Puerto Rico. Naranjito was left in complete devastation and isolation, with no electrical power, no communication and no physical access due to destroyed highways. The Guadiana River caused severe flooding in the urban area of Naranjito. The storm triggered numerous landslides in Naranjito. Elderly, especially, struggled to recover.

== Geography ==
Naranjito is located in the central mountainous region.

=== Hydrography ===
Rivers and streams of Naranjito include Río Cañas, Río Cibuco, Río Grande de Manatí, Río Guadiana and Río Mavilla.

=== Barrios ===
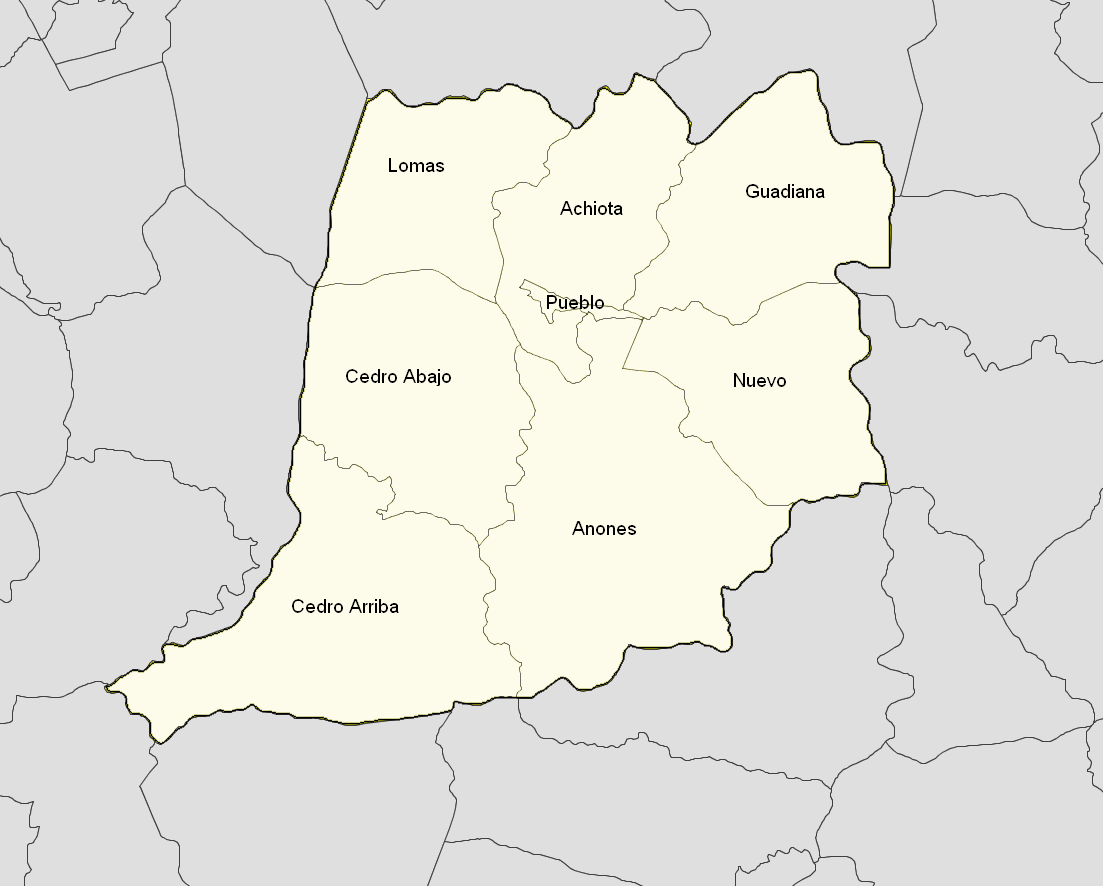
Subdivisions of Naranjito

Like all municipalities of Puerto Rico, Naranjito is subdivided into barrios. The municipal buildings, central square and large Catholic church are located in a barrio referred to as "el pueblo".

1. Achiote
2. Anones
3. Nuevo
4. Cedro Abajo
5. Cedro Arriba
6. Guadiana
7. Lomas, also known as Lomas Garcia
8. Naranjito barrio-pueblo

=== Sectors ===
Barrios (which are, in contemporary times, roughly comparable to minor civil divisions) are further subdivided into smaller areas called sectores (sectors in English). The types of sectores may vary, from normally sector to urbanización to reparto to barriada to residencial, among others.

=== Special Communities ===
Comunidades Especiales de Puerto Rico (Special Communities of Puerto Rico) are marginalized communities whose citizens are experiencing a certain amount of social exclusion. A map shows these communities occur in nearly every municipality of the commonwealth. Of the 742 places that were on the list in 2014, the following barrios, communities, sectors, or neighborhoods were in Naranjito: La Pajona (Los Alvarado) in Cedro Arriba, Las Parcelas in Lomas García, Los Pampers (Sico Martínez) in Lomas García, Sector Benito Nieves/Los Quilés in Lomas García, Comunidad Lago La Plata, La Colina, San Antonio y San Cristóbal, Casco Urbano (Las Barriadas), Parcelas Hevia, Sector Mulitas, Comunidad Cayito Ríos, Lomas Jaguas, Los Pelusa in Cedro Abajo, Comunidades Riíto 1 y II in Cedro Arriba, Comunidad El Palmar, Los López in Cedro Abajo, Fondo del Saco in Achiote and La Sabana in Cedro Abajo.

== Demographics ==
Historical population
Census	Pop.	Note	%±
1900	8,101		—
1910	8,876		9.6%
1920	10,503		18.3%
1930	11,645		10.9%
1940	13,954		19.8%
1950	15,927		14.1%
1960	17,319		8.7%
1970	19,913		15.0%
1980	23,633		18.7%
1990	27,914		18.1%
2000	29,709		6.4%
2010	30,402		2.3%
2020	29,241		−3.8%
2025 (est.)	29,627	▲	1.3%
U.S. Decennial Census; 1899 (shown as 1900) 1910-1930; 1930-1950 1960-2000 2010 2020

== Tourism ==
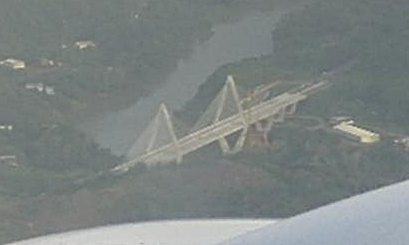
Puente Atirantado Jesús Izcoa Moure

=== Landmarks and places of interest ===
- Anones Park
- Cancha Gelito Ortega
- Cedro Abajo Falls (Las Lagrimas Falls)
- La Marina Boardwalk
- La Plata Lake
- Las Avispas Hills
- Municipal Swimming Pool
- Trovador Plaza
- Mirador de Anones
- Puente Atirantado Jesús Izcoa Moure
- El Cerro Community

== Economy ==
Traditionally the main agricultural crops of Naranjito are coffee and the tobacco. In recent years have borne fruits such as bananas, oranges, papayas, and other tropical fruits; also in the town the poultry factory has been very popular, specifically the dairy cattle (fresh milk). Naranjito has many factories, most of these factories make garments (clothing).

== Culture ==
=== Festivals and events ===
Naranjito celebrates its patron saint festival in September. The Fiestas Patronales de San Miguel Arcangel is a religious and cultural celebration that generally features parades, games, artisans, amusement rides, regional food, and live entertainment.

Other festivals and events celebrated in Naranjito include:

- Mothers Day - May
- San Antonio Day - June
- Chango Festival - June
- Anon Festival - June
- Volleyball Tournament - February - June
- Archangel Saint Michael Day - September
- The Turkey Marathon - November

=== Sports ===
The Naranjito Changos, better known as Los Changos De Naranjito, are a professional male volleyball team based in Naranjito. The team is one of the most successful sports franchises in Puerto Rico.

== Government ==
All municipalities in Puerto Rico are administered by a mayor, elected every four years. The current mayor of Naranjito is Orlando Ortiz Chevres, of the New Progressive Party (PNP). He was first elected at the 2008 general elections.

The city belongs to the Puerto Rico Senatorial district VI, which is represented by two Senators. In 2024, Rafael Santos Ortiz and Wilmer Reyes Berríos were elected as District Senators.

== Transportation ==
There are 19 bridges in Naranjito.

== Symbols ==
The municipio has an official flag and coat of arms.

=== Flag ===
Naranjito's flag consists of an orange flag crossed by two narrow green stripes close to the superior and inferior edges. The orange color in the flag symbolizes the town of Naranjito (little orange tree), while the green symbolizes its green mountains.

=== Coat of arms ===
The coat of arms is a red cross, the symbol of the angel Saint Michael, patron of Naranjito. The globe with the cross symbolizes the power and sovereignty of God. The gold and red stripes that appear in the second and third quarters, constitute the primitive baton of the Guadiana lineage. The lily twigs are a tribute of Saint Anthony of Padua, confessor and doctor of the Church. The orange tree represents the small tree that gave the town's name, Naranjito. The crown is symbol of moral unit of the town.

== Education ==
Naranjito includes several public and private schools distributed through several regions. Public education is handled by the Puerto Rico Department of Education

=== Elementary schools ===
- Bernarda Robles De Hevia
- Don Manolo Rivera
- Felipa Sanchez Cruzado
- Jose Archilla Cabrera
- Francisco Roque Muñoz
- Rosa Luz Zayas
- Silvestre Martinez

=== Middle and junior high schools ===
- Coleen Vazquez Urrutia
- Mercedes Rosado
- S.U. Adolfo Garcia
- S.U. Fidel G Padilla
- S.U. Pedro Fernandez

=== High schools ===
- Francisco Morales
- Vocacional Rubén Rodríguez Figueroa

=== Private schools ===
- Academia Santa Teresita (K-12)

== Media ==
A foot pursuit of the movie Fast & Furious 5 in which Dominic Toretto (Vin Diesel), Mia Toretto (Jordana Brewster) and Brian O'Connor (Paul Walker) are chased across favela rooftops by Luke Hobbs (Dwayne Johnson) and his team was filmed over the course of a week in Naranjito. The scene was considered difficult to shoot, as pathways were slippery from moist tropical heat and the scene involved actors and stunt doubles running while avoiding dogs, chickens and other stray animals loose in the area. To capture the scene, a 420-foot cable-camera rig was used to allow for a fast moving, birds-eye view of the action, and cameras on cranes were set up on rooftops and in alleyways. Walker and Brewster made multiple takes of the conclusion of the scene, requiring them to jump nearly 30 feet from a building onto a waiting safety mat. In total the production employed 236 technicians, 13,145 extras, and generated 16,824 room nights at hotels, contributing $27 million to the local community.

== Notable people ==
- Francisco López Cruz, an important musicologist, musician, composer, and educator that dedicated his life to promote Puerto Rican Folk music.
- Christian Nieves, an internationally known cuatro player

== Books about Naranjito ==
- El Chango. Apuntes Historicos del Pueblo de Naranjito-1824-1998, Author: Silvestre J. Morales 1999

== See also ==
- List of Puerto Ricans
- History of Puerto Rico
- Did you know-Puerto Rico?
