= Nuevo, Naranjito, Puerto Rico =

Barrio of Puerto Rico

Nuevo
- Barrio
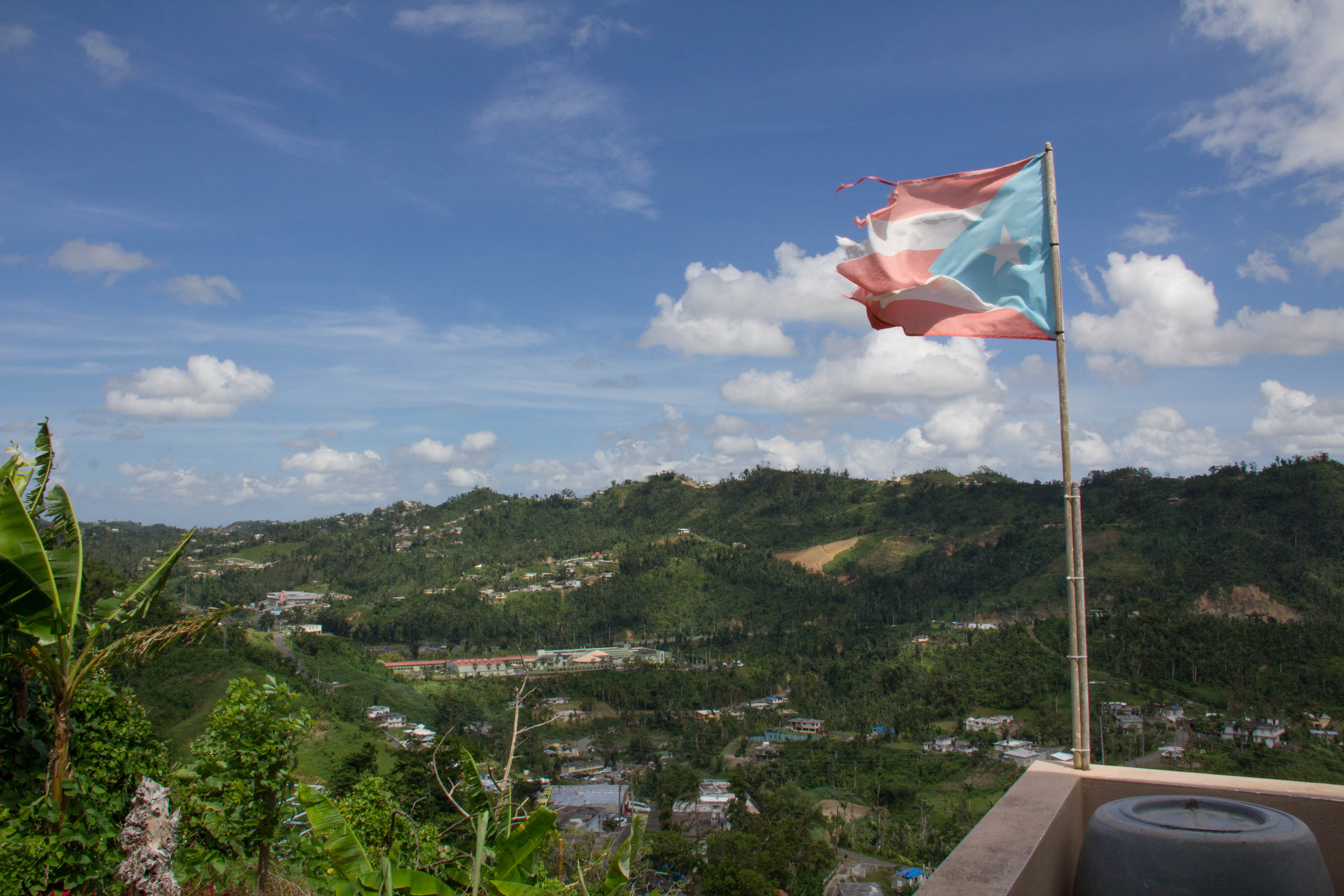
- View from Barrio Nuevo

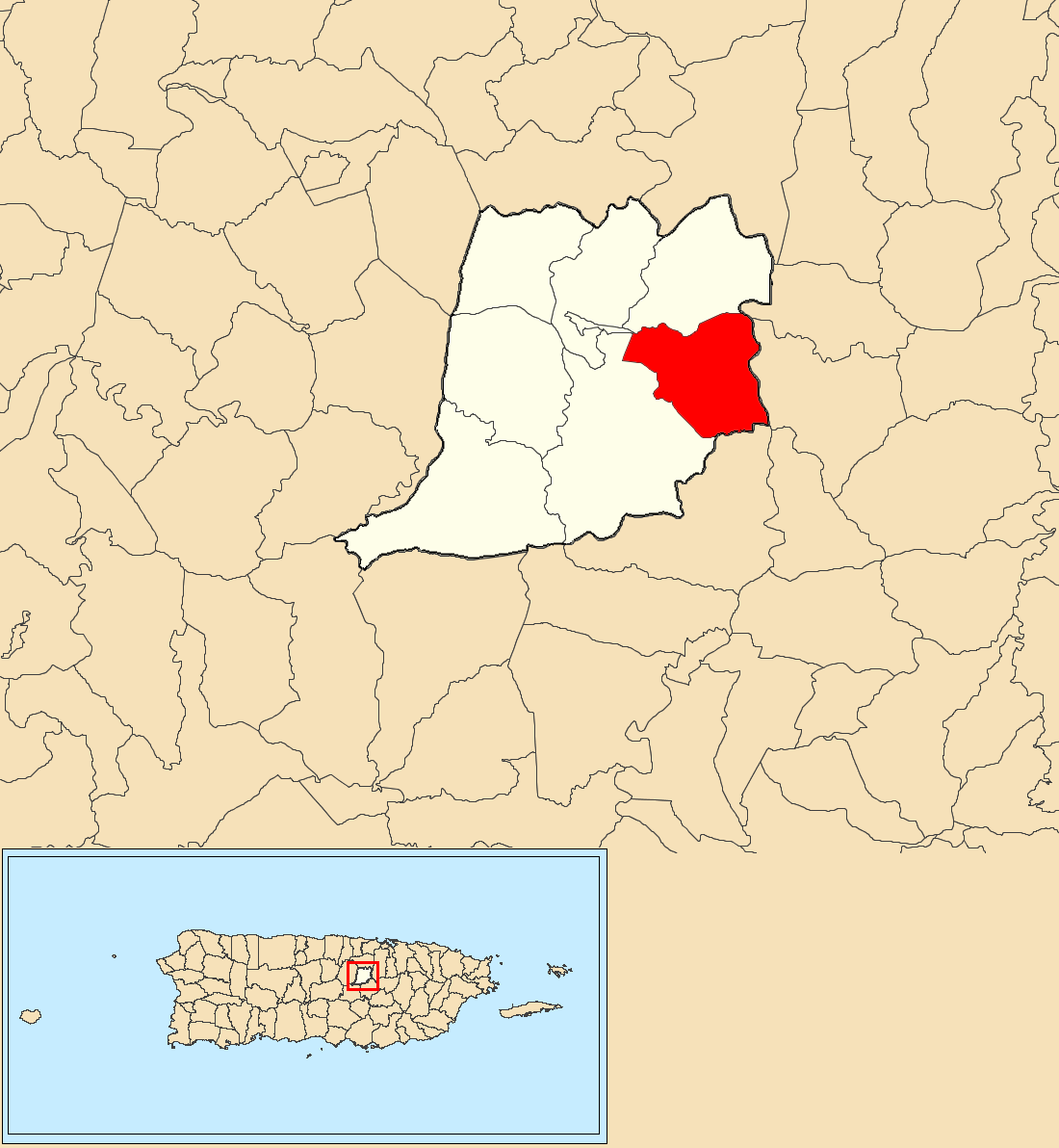
- Location of Nuevo within the municipality of Naranjito shown in red

- Location of Puerto Rico
- Coordinates: 18°17′12″N 66°13′25″W
- Commonwealth: Puerto Rico
- Municipality: Naranjito

Area
  - Total: 3.17 sq mi (8.2 km^{2})
  - Land: 3.16 sq mi (8.2 km^{2})
  - Water: 0.01 sq mi (0.026 km^{2})
- Elevation: 981 ft (299 m)

Population (2010)
  - Total: 4,004
  - Density: 1,267.1/sq mi (489.2/km^{2})
- Source: 2010 Census
- Time zone: UTC−4 (AST)
- ZIP Code: 00719
- Area code: 787/939

Nuevo is a barrio in the municipality of Naranjito, Puerto Rico. Its population in 2010 was 4,004.

== History ==
Nuevo was in Spain's gazetteers until Puerto Rico was ceded by Spain in the aftermath of the Spanish–American War under the terms of the Treaty of Paris of 1898 and became an unincorporated territory of the United States. In 1899, the United States Department of War conducted a census of Puerto Rico finding that the population of Nuevo barrio was 1,081.

Historical population
Census	Pop.	Note	%±
1900	1,081		—
1910	1,415		30.9%
1920	1,495		5.7%
1930	1,589		6.3%
1940	1,801		13.3%
1950	2,014		11.8%
1960	2,154		7.0%
1970	2,528		17.4%
1980	3,186		26.0%
1990	3,715		16.6%
2000	3,840		3.4%
2010	4,004		4.3%
U.S. Decennial Census; 1899 (shown as 1900) 1910-1930; 1930-1950 1980-2000 2010

== Sectors ==
Barrios (which are, in contemporary times, roughly comparable to minor civil divisions) in turn are further subdivided into smaller local populated place areas/units called sectores (sectors in English). The types of sectores may vary, from normally sector to urbanización to reparto to barriada to residencial, among others.

The following sectors are in Nuevo barrio:

Camino Don Manolo, Camino González Mathews, Camino Los Matos, Eusebio Rivera, Parcelas Hevia, Sector Aponte, Sector Bernard, Sector Bunker Hills, Sector Cabrera, Sector Cintrón, Sector Cuadrado, Sector Doña Bacha, Sector Entrada Guadiana, Sector Febus, Sector Hevia, Sector Hogar Crea, Sector La Tosca, Sector Loma del Viento, Sector Martínez, Sector Matadero, Sector Mulitas, Sector Negrón, Sector Ortega, Sector Puente Plata, Sector Santa María (antes Villa Embrolla), Sector Siete Curvas, Sector Sostre, Urbanización Campo Bello, Urbanización Valle Verde, and Villa del Plata.

== Hurricane Maria ==
After Hurricane Maria struck the island of Puerto Rico, residents of Nuevo barrio waited 7 to 8 months to have electrical power restored. Several landslides affected this barrio along PR-5. Work was completed with FEMA funds in October 2021 to stabilize and make the highway safe.

== Gallery ==
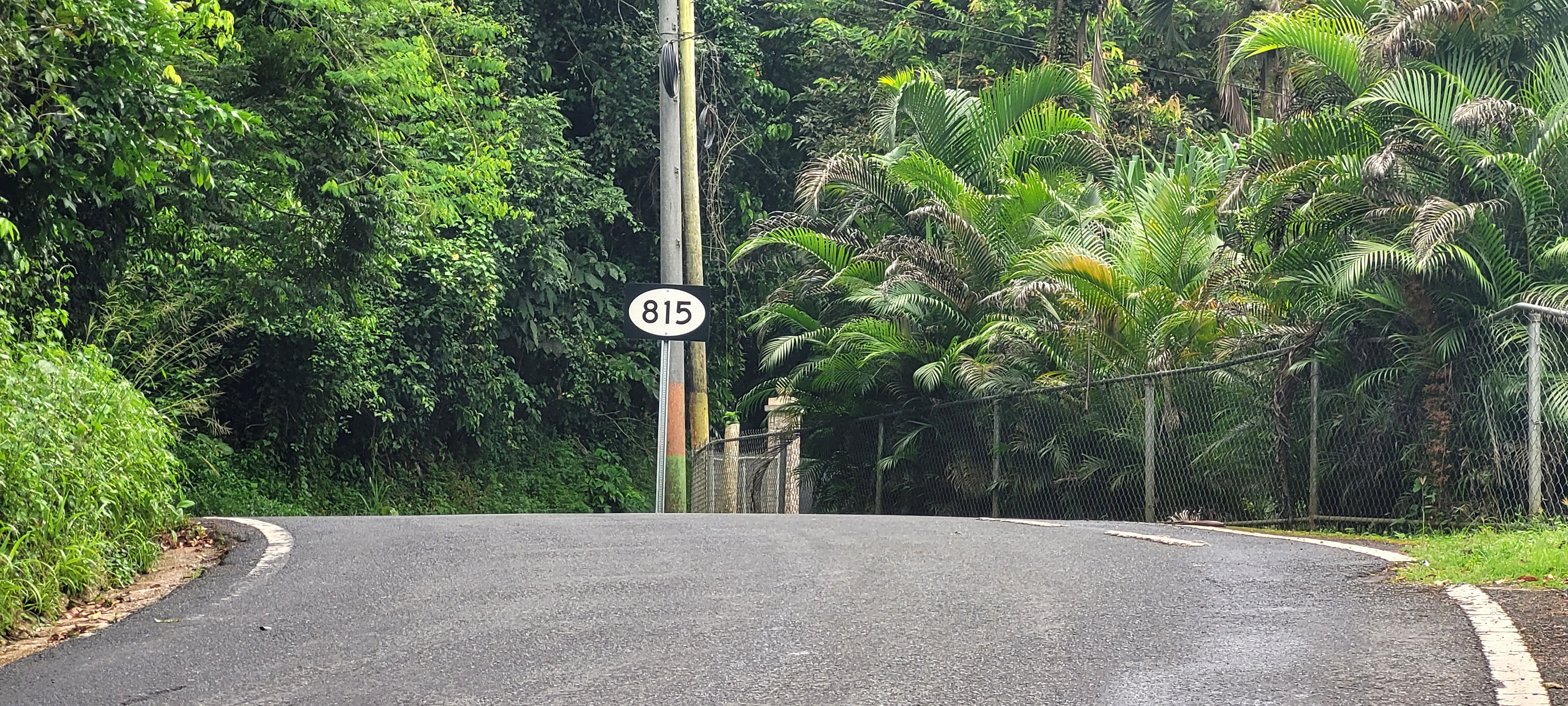
Puerto Rico Highway 815 in Barrio Nuevo

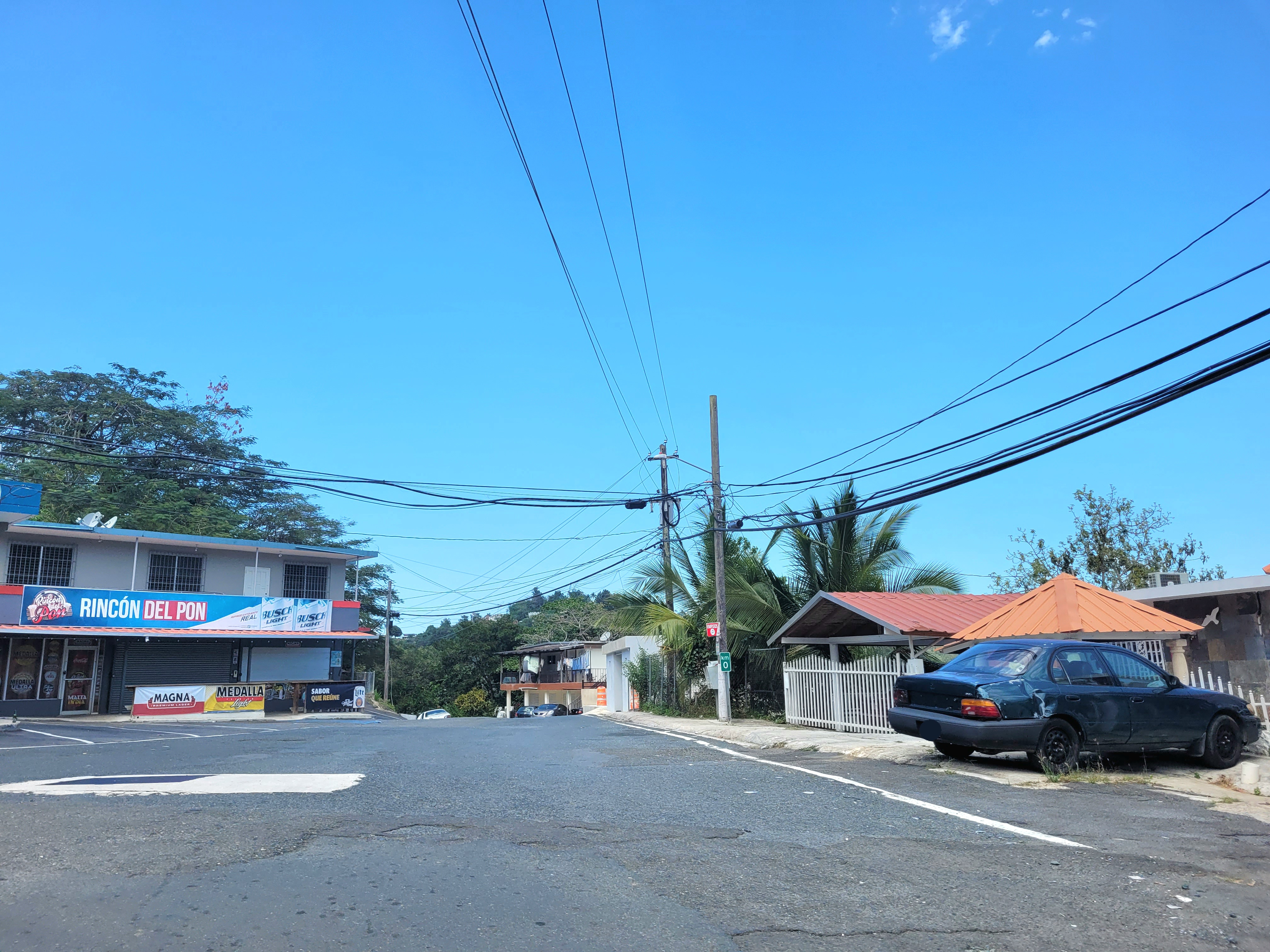
Puerto Rico Highway 8126 in Barrio Nuevo

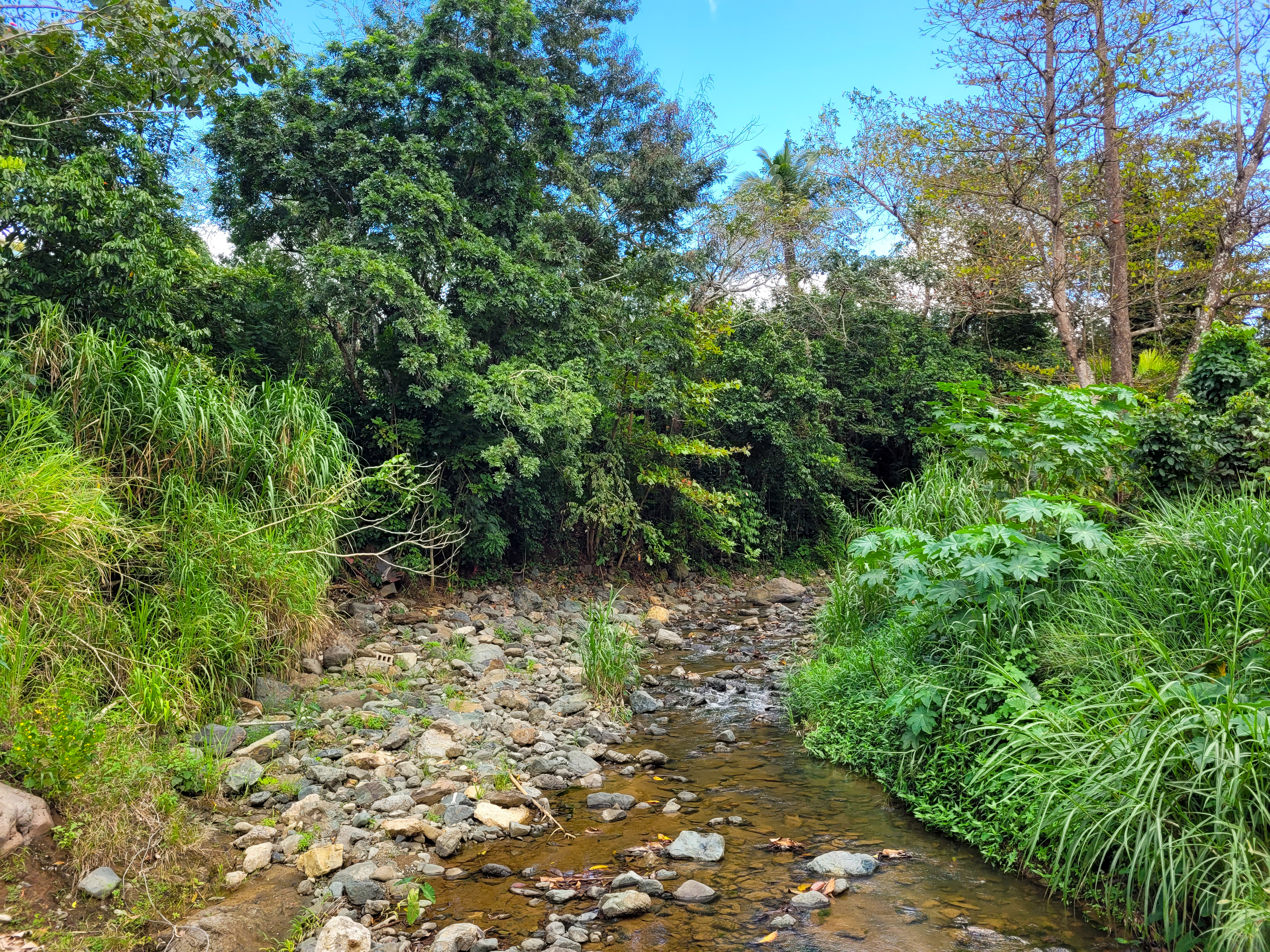
Quebrada Anones in Barrio Nuevo

== See also ==
- List of communities in Puerto Rico
- List of barrios and sectors of Naranjito, Puerto Rico
