= Naranjito barrio-pueblo =

Historical and administrative center (seat) of Naranjito, Puerto Rico

Naranjito barrio-pueblo Pueblo de Naranjito
- Municipality Seat
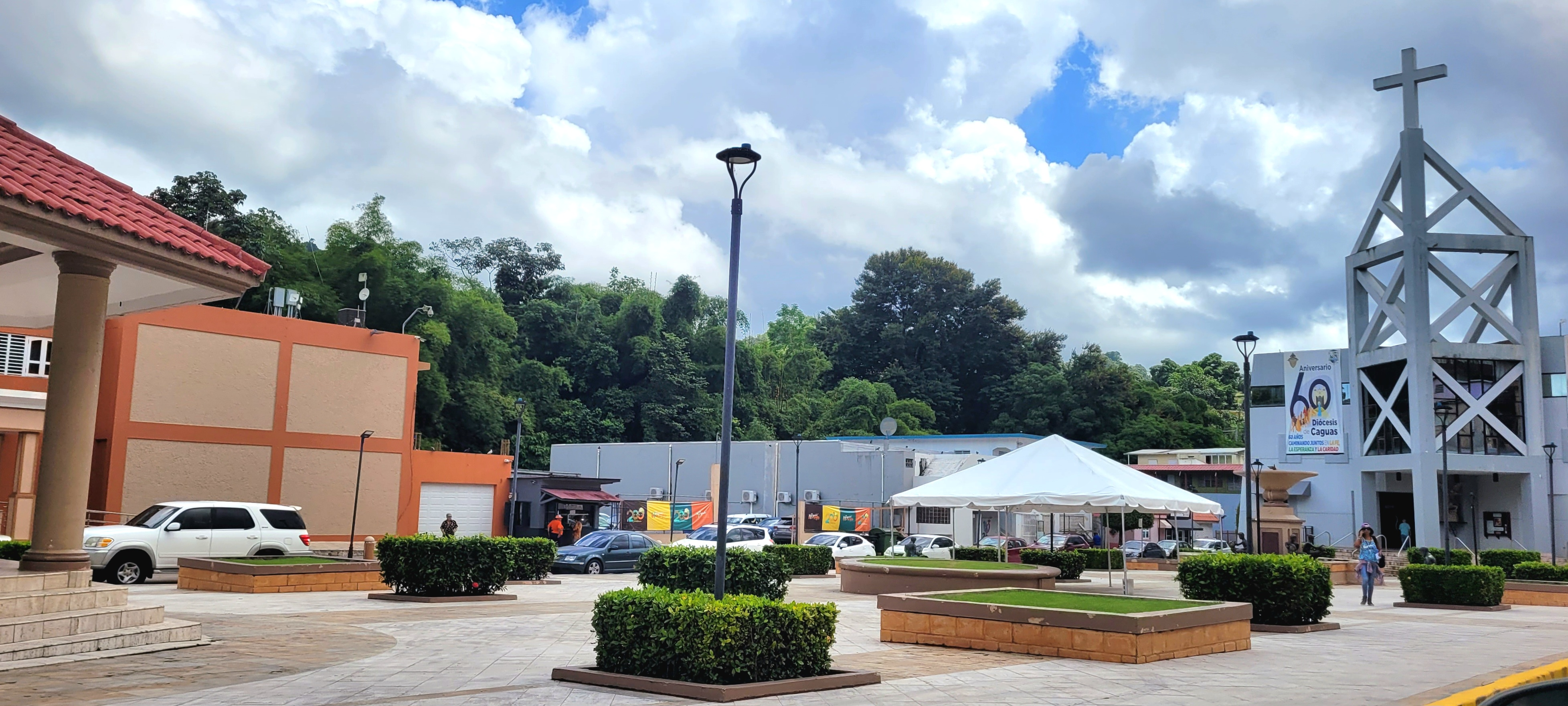
- Naranjito urban square

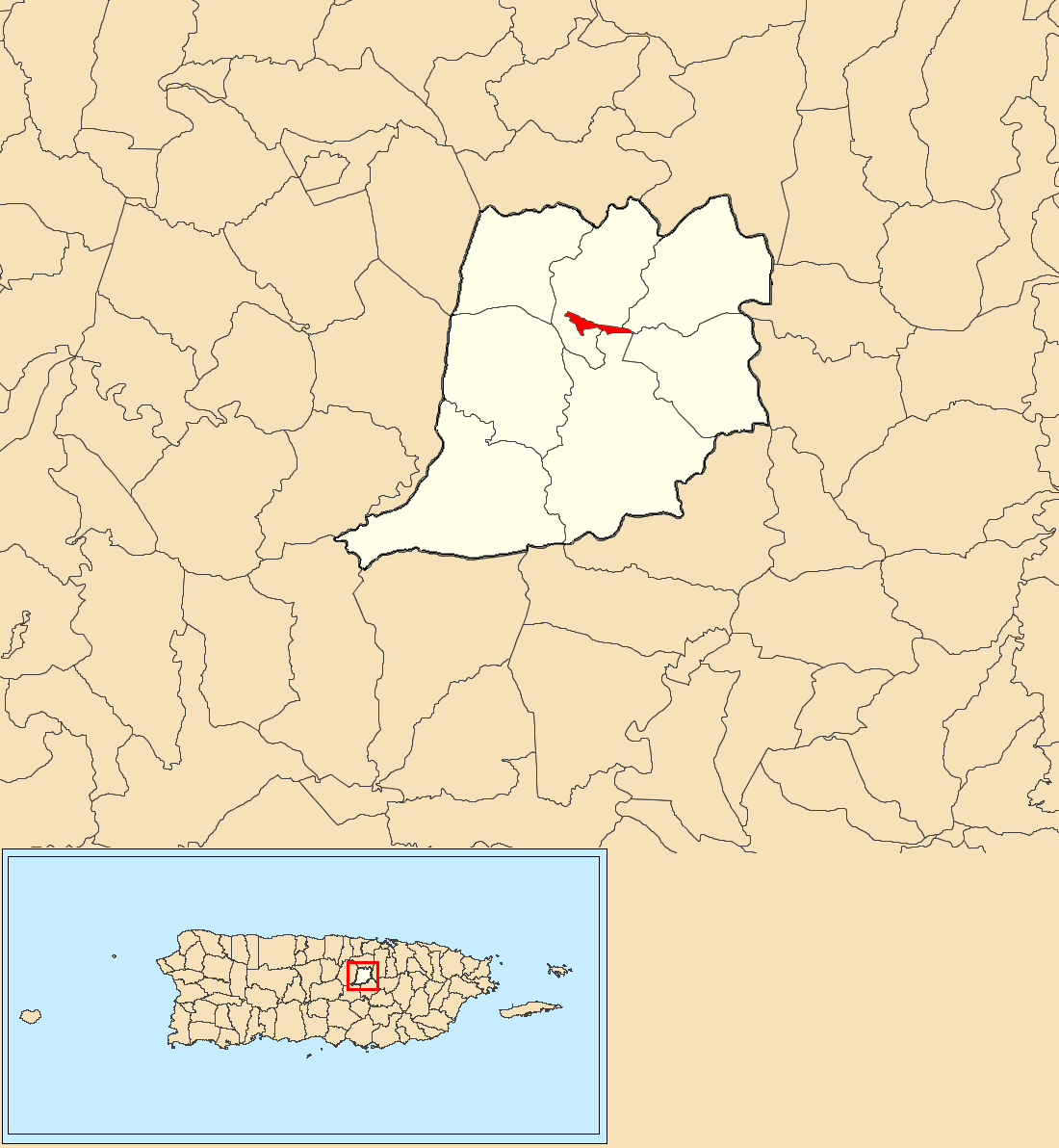
- Location of Naranjito barrio-pueblo within the municipality of Naranjito shown in red

- Location of Puerto Rico
- Coordinates: 18°18′05″N 66°14′59″W
- Commonwealth: Puerto Rico
- Municipality: Naranjito

Area
  - Total: 0.12 sq mi (0.31 km^{2})
  - Land: 0.12 sq mi (0.31 km^{2})
  - Water: 0 sq mi (0 km^{2})
- Elevation: 374 ft (114 m)

Population (2010)
  - Total: 1,157
  - Density: 9,641.7/sq mi (3,722.7/km^{2})
- Source: 2010 Census
- Time zone: UTC−4 (AST)
- ZIP Code: 00719
- Area code: 787/939

Naranjito barrio-pueblo is a barrio and the administrative center (seat) of Naranjito, a municipality of Puerto Rico. Its population in 2010 was 1,157.

As was customary in Spain, in Puerto Rico, the municipality has a barrio called pueblo which contains a central plaza, the municipal buildings (city hall), and a Catholic church. Fiestas patronales (patron saint festivals) are held in the central plaza every year.

Historical population
Census	Pop.	Note	%±
1900	614		—
1910	769		25.2%
1920	1,223		59.0%
1930	1,436		17.4%
1940	1,790		24.7%
1950	2,358		31.7%
1960	2,719		15.3%
1970	0		−100.0%
1980	1,764		—
1990	1,437		−18.5%
2000	1,150		−20.0%
2010	1,157		0.6%
U.S. Decennial Census; 1899 (shown as 1900) 1910-1930; 1930-1950 1980-2000 2010

== The central plaza and its church ==
The central plaza, or square, is a place for official and unofficial recreational events and a place where people can gather and socialize from dusk to dawn. The Laws of the Indies, Spanish law, which regulated life in Puerto Rico in the early 19th century, stated the plaza's purpose was for "the parties" (celebrations, festivities) (Spanish: a propósito para las fiestas), and that the square should be proportionally large enough for the number of neighbors (Spanish: grandeza proporcionada al número de vecinos). These Spanish regulations also stated that the streets nearby should be comfortable portals for passersby, protecting them from the elements: sun and rain.

Located across the central plaza in Naranjito barrio-pueblo is the Parroquia San Miguel Arcángel, a Roman Catholic church.

== History ==
Naranjito barrio-pueblo was in Spain's gazetteers until Puerto Rico was ceded by Spain in the aftermath of the Spanish–American War under the terms of the Treaty of Paris of 1898 and became an unincorporated territory of the United States. In 1899, the United States Department of War conducted a census of Puerto Rico finding that the population of Naranjito Pueblo was 614.

== Sectors ==
Barrios (which are, in contemporary times, roughly comparable to minor civil divisions) are further subdivided into smaller areas called sectores (sectors in English). The types of sectores may vary, from normally sector to urbanización to reparto to barriada to residencial, among others.

The following sectors are in Naranjito barrio-pueblo:

Barriada La Marina, Barriada Monte Verde, Barriada San Antonio, Barriada San Cristóbal, Barriada San Miguel, Calle Georgetti, Calle Ignacio Morales Acosta, Calle Pedro Cid, Calle Víctor J. Mojica, and Sector Acueducto.

== See also ==
- List of communities in Puerto Rico
- List of barrios and sectors of Naranjito, Puerto Rico
