= Puerto Rico Highway 174 =

Highway in Puerto Rico

Highway 174
- Ruta 174

Route information
- Maintained by Puerto Rico DTPW
- Length: 22.7 km (14.1 mi)

Major junctions
- South end: PR-156 in Aguas Buenas barrio-pueblo
- PR-833 in Guaraguao; PR-812 in Guaraguao Arriba; PR-830 in Guaraguao Abajo; PR-832 in Guaraguao Abajo; PR-831 / PR-889 in Minillas–Juan Sánchez; PR-177 in Minillas–Juan Sánchez
- North end: PR-5 in Bayamón barrio-pueblo–Minillas

Location
- Country: United States
- Territory: Puerto Rico
- Municipalities: Aguas Buenas, Guaynabo, Bayamón

Highway system
- Roads in Puerto Rico; List
← PR-173	→ PR-175

Puerto Rico Highway 174 (PR-174) is a road that travels from Bayamón, Puerto Rico to Aguas Buenas. This highway begins at PR-5 south of downtown Bayamón and ends at PR-156 in downtown Aguas Buenas.

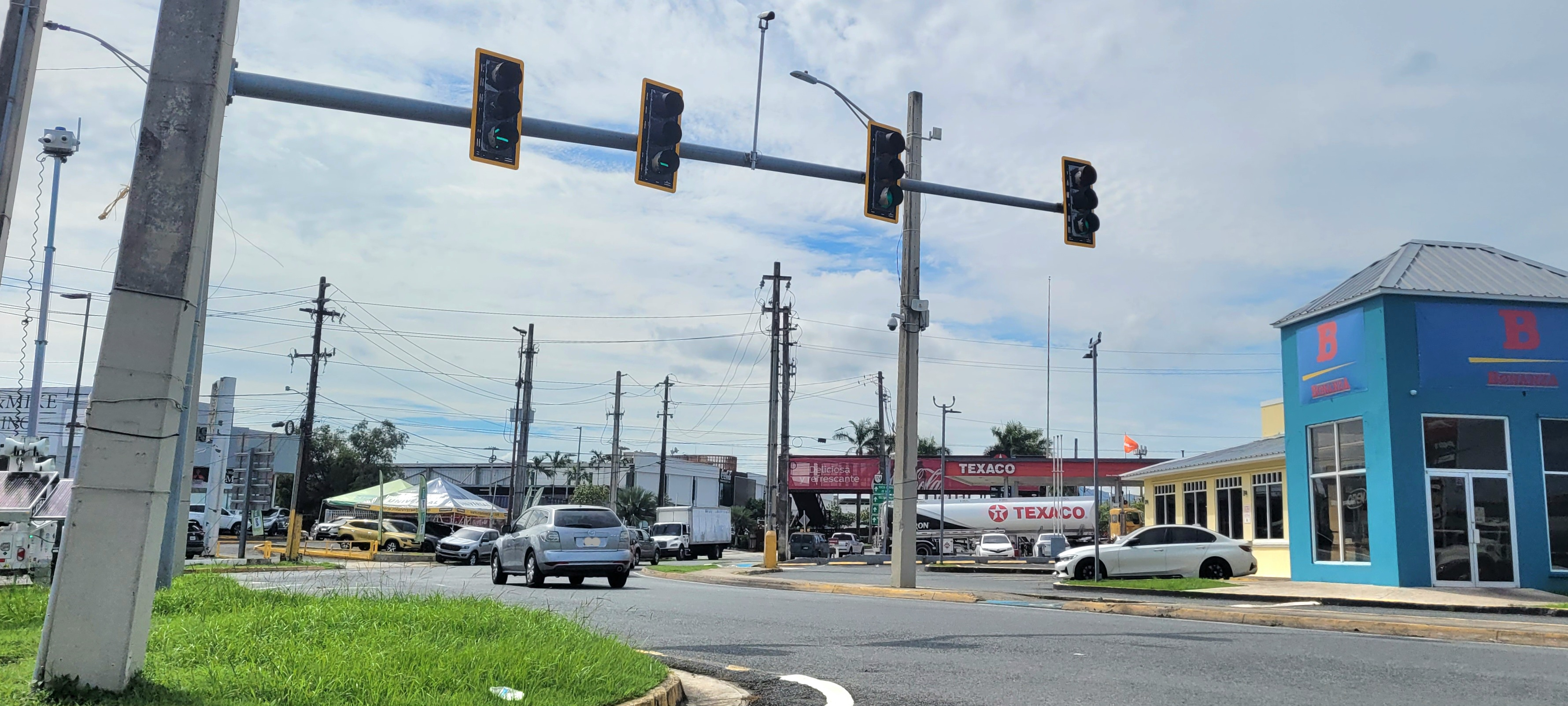
Puerto Rico Highway 174 south between Juan Sánchez and Minillas barrios, Bayamón

== Major intersections ==
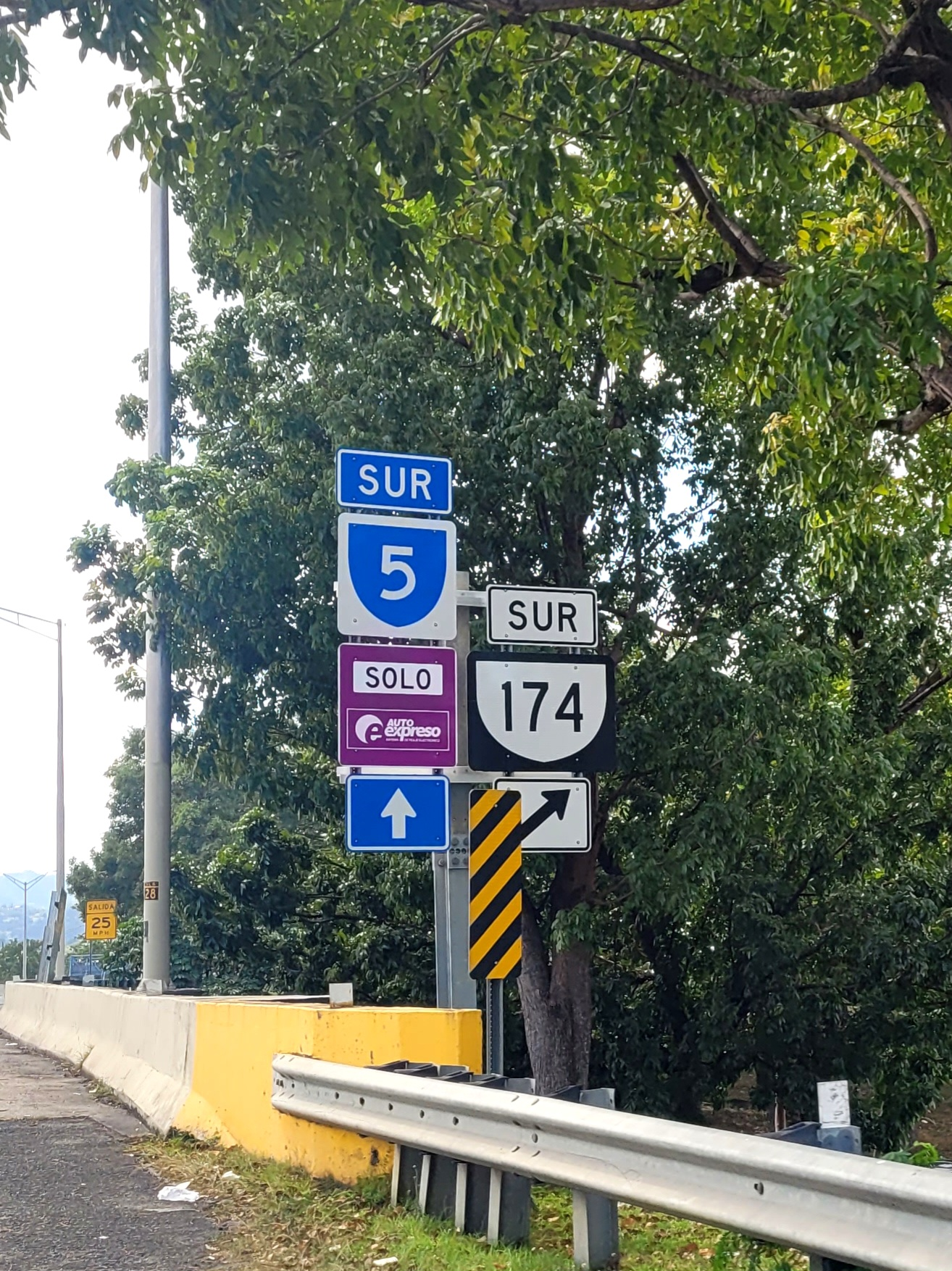
PR-5 south at its exit to the northern terminus of PR-174 between downtown Bayamón and Minillas barrio

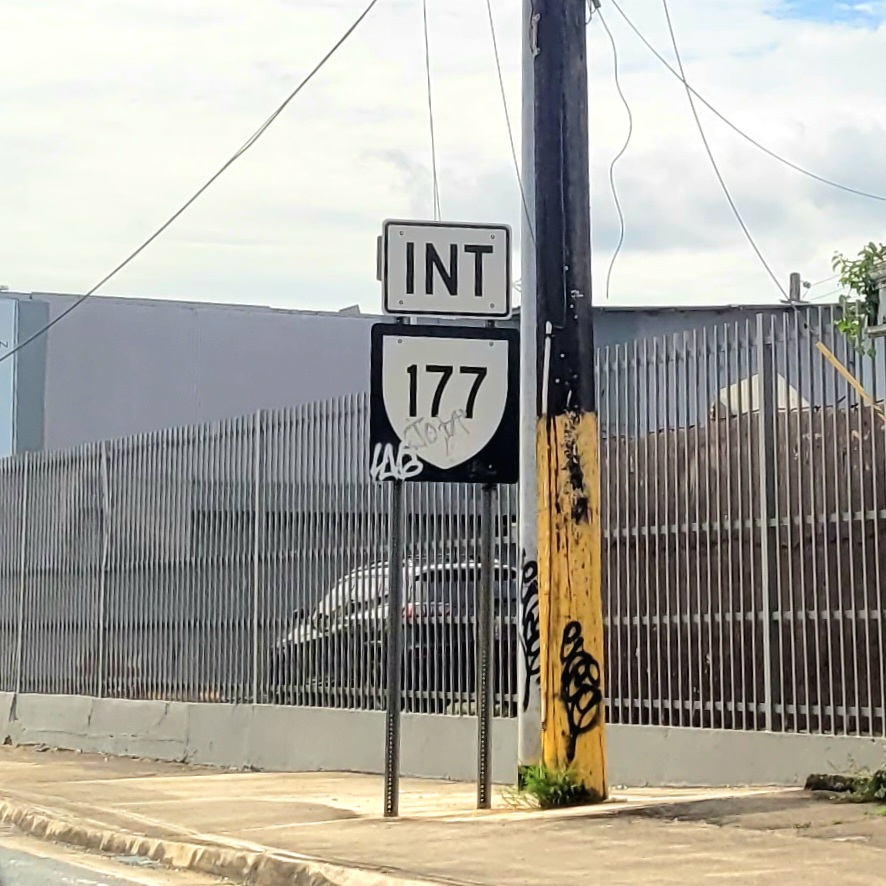
PR-174 south near PR-177 intersection between Juan Sánchez and Minillas barrios, Bayamón

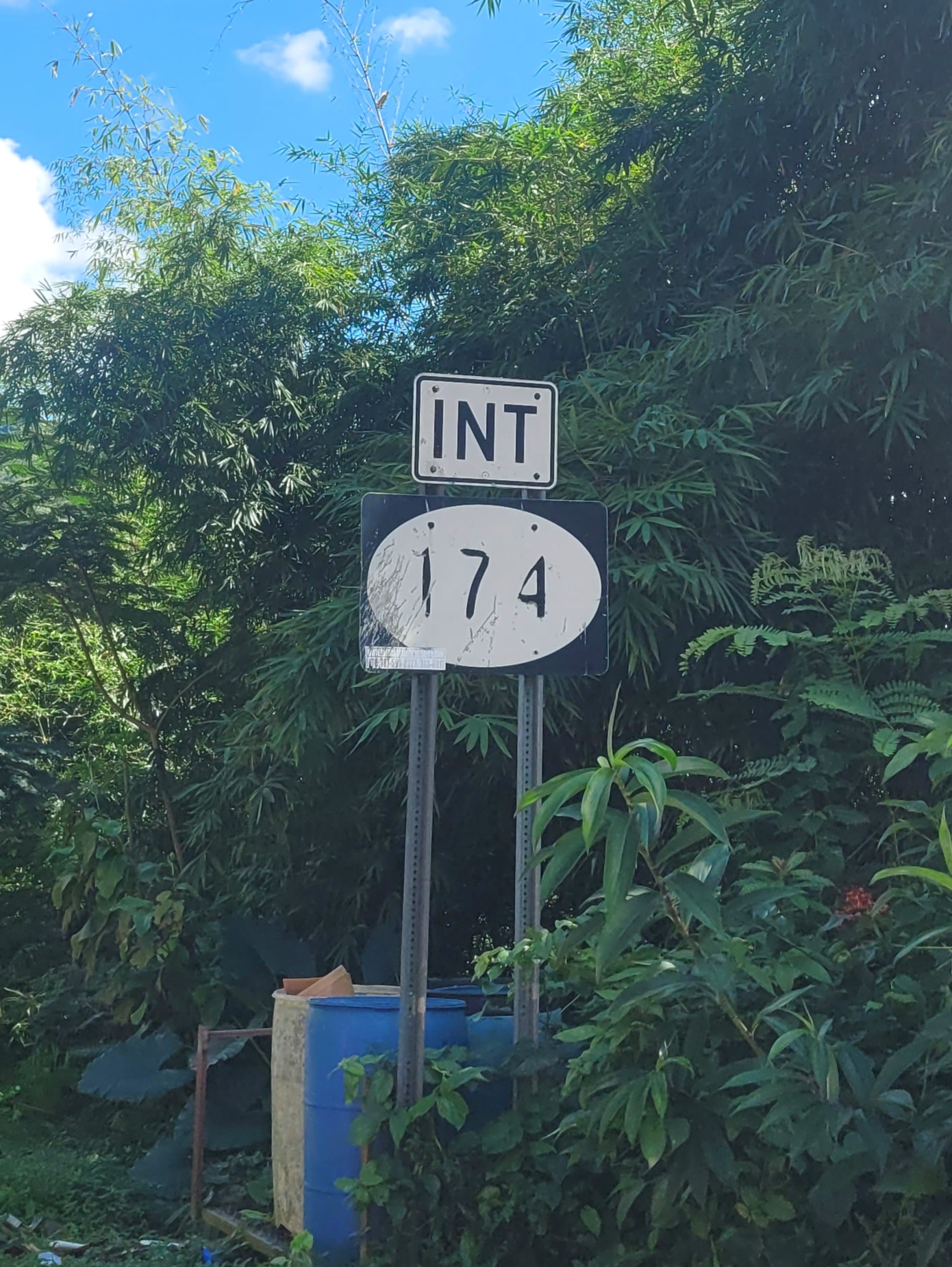
PR-830 east approaching PR-174 in Guaraguao Abajo, Bayamón

Municipality	Location	km	mi	Destinations	Notes
Aguas Buenas	Aguas Buenas barrio-pueblo	22.7	14.1	PR-156 (Calle Rafael Lasa) – Caguas, Comerío	Southern terminus of PR-174
Guaynabo	Guaraguao	13.4	8.3	PR-833 – Guaraguao	
Bayamón	Guaraguao Arriba	11.9	7.4	PR-812 – Comerío	
Bayamón	Guaraguao Abajo	9.4	5.8	PR-830 – Naranjito, Comerío	
Bayamón	Guaraguao Abajo	8.2	5.1	PR-832 to PR-833 – Guaraguao	
Bayamón	Minillas–Juan Sánchez line	2.3	1.4	PR-831 (Avenida Laurel) / PR-889 – Bayamón, Guaynabo	
Bayamón	Minillas–Juan Sánchez line	1.6	0.99	PR-177 east (Avenida Lomas Verdes) to PR-2 / PR-Avenida Main – Bayamón, Guaynabo	
Bayamón	Minillas–Juan Sánchez line	0.8	0.50	To PR-2 / PR-Avenida Aguas Buenas – Bayamón	
Bayamón	Bayamón barrio-pueblo–Minillas line	0.6– 0.5	0.37– 0.31	PR-Avenida Teniente Nelson Martínez – Bayamón	
Bayamón	Bayamón barrio-pueblo–Minillas line	0.0	0.0	PR-5 (Expreso Río Hondo) to PR-2 / PR-Avenida Doctor Ramón Luis Rodríguez – Bayamón, Comerío, Cataño, San Juan, Arecibo	Northern terminus of PR-174; partial cloverleaf interchange
1.000 mi = 1.609 km; 1.000 km = 0.621 mi
