= Marqués de la Serna Bridge =

- U.S. National Register of Historic Places
- Puerto Rico Historic Sites and Zones
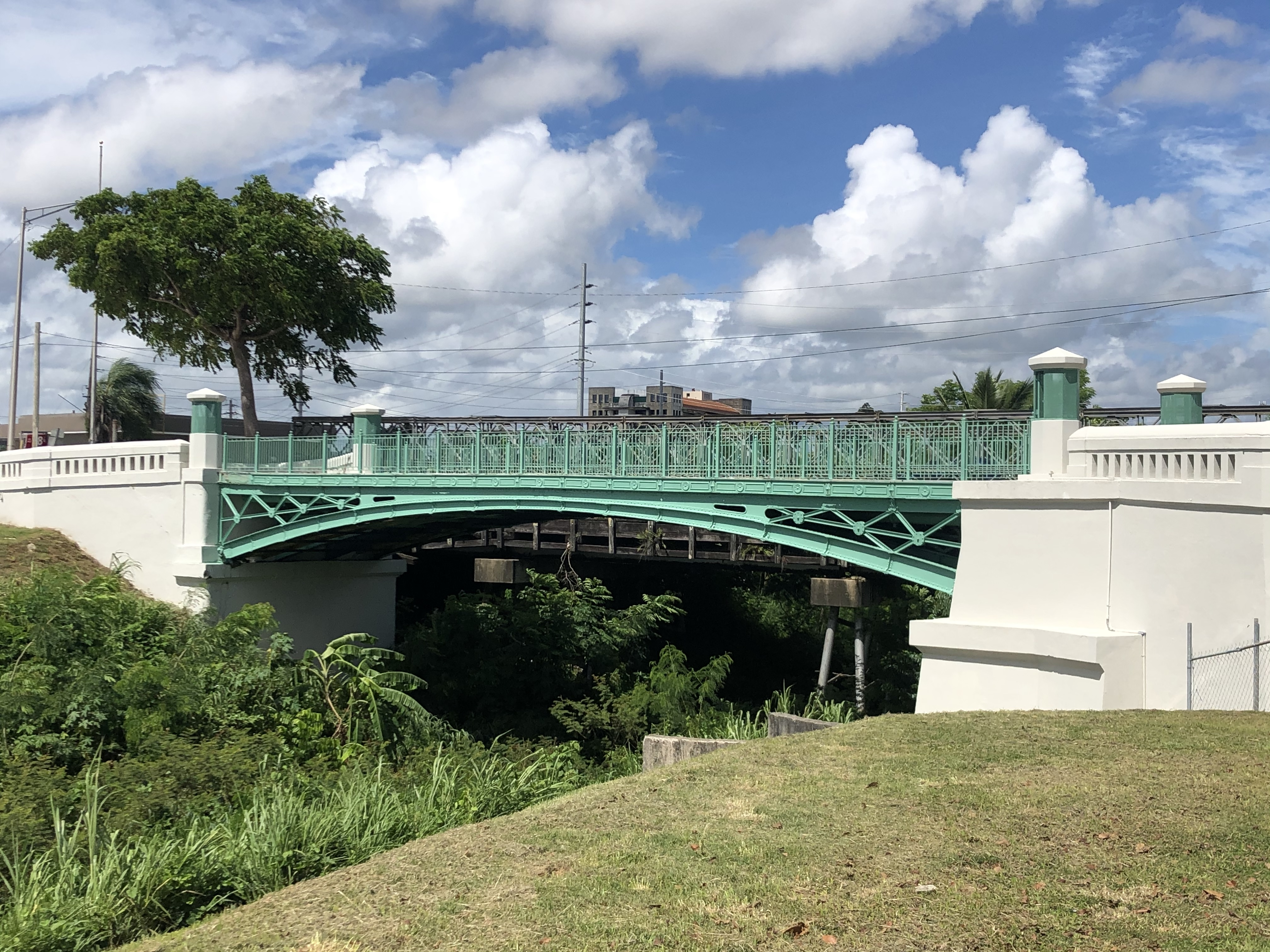
- Bridge in 2020.

- Location within Puerto Rico
- Location: Highway 890, km 24.1 Bayamón, Puerto Rico
- Coordinates: 18°24′10″N 66°9′21″W
- Built: 1869
- Architect: Isidoro Abarca
- Architectural style: Rolled iron segmented arch
- NRHP reference No.: 95000850
- RNSZH No.: 2000-(RMSJ)-00-JP-SH

Significant dates
- Added to NRHP: July 19, 1995
- Designated RNSZH: February 3, 2000

Marqués de la Serna Bridge (Spanish: Puente Marqués de la Serna), also known as Bayamón Bridge (Puente de Bayamón) and Bridge #379, is a historic rolled iron segmented arch bridge that crosses the Bayamón River, located between the barrios of Bayamón Pueblo and Juan Sánchez in the Puerto Rican municipality of Bayamón. Its lowered arches, similar to those of the Pont d'Arcole in Paris, are unique in Puerto Rico. The bridge was added to the United States National Register of Historic Places on July 19, 1995, and to the Puerto Rico Register of Historic Sites and Zones in 2000.

The bridge dates to 1869 and it was named after the Marquis of Serna, Felix Maria de Messina, who was governor of Puerto Rico from 1862 to 1865. It is the first metal bridge to have been built in the island, and the only metal arch bridge that exists in Puerto Rico. The iron elements were brought from France. The bridge was assembled by Isidoro Abarca, founder of Abarca Foundry, over the rubble masonry abutments of an older wooden bridge as part at the Cataño-Bayamón highway, one of the first in Puerto Rico and an important link between the San Juan Bay and the southward and westward agricultural lands. Between 1881 and the early 1900s the bridge also served the Línea Ferrea del Oeste railroad. For that purpose, two of the arches were reinforced in 1881. This valuable relic is the only bridge of its type in Puerto Rico and within the jurisdiction of the United States. It is well conserved and considered an excellent example of how to preserve historical bridges no longer in vehicular use for full recreational and educational value.
