= Nuevo =

Nuevo is the Spanish word for "new". It may refer to:

- Nuevology, California, a town in California, United States
- Nuevo (band), featuring singer and musician Peter Godwin
- Nuevo (Bayamón), a settlement in Puerto Rico
- "Nuevo", Spanish-language version of "Novo" (song) by Laura Pausini (2018}
- Nuevo (album), a 2002 album by the Kronos Quartet
