= Guaraguao Abajo, Bayamón, Puerto Rico =

Barrio of Puerto Rico

Guaraguao Abajo
- Barrio
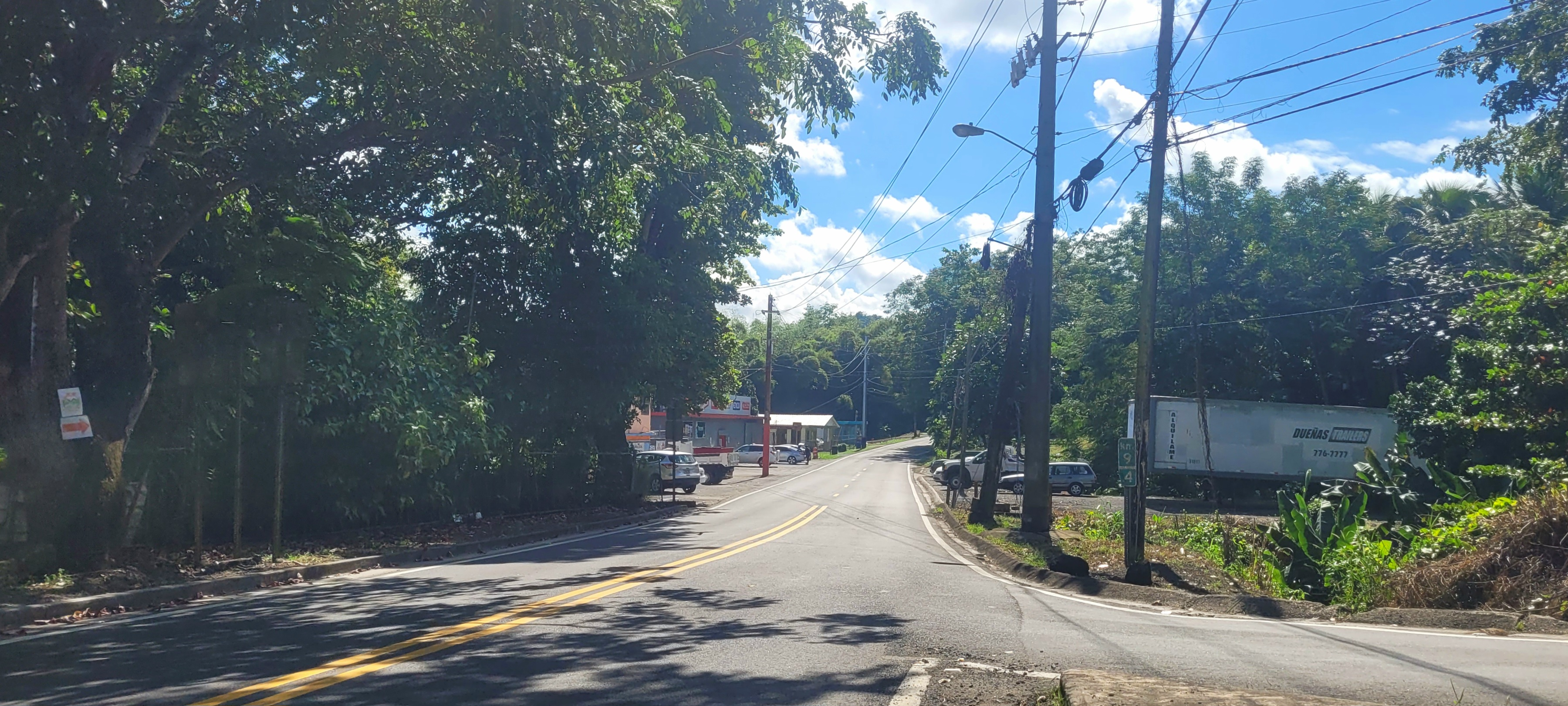
- Puerto Rico Highway 174 in Guaraguao Abajo

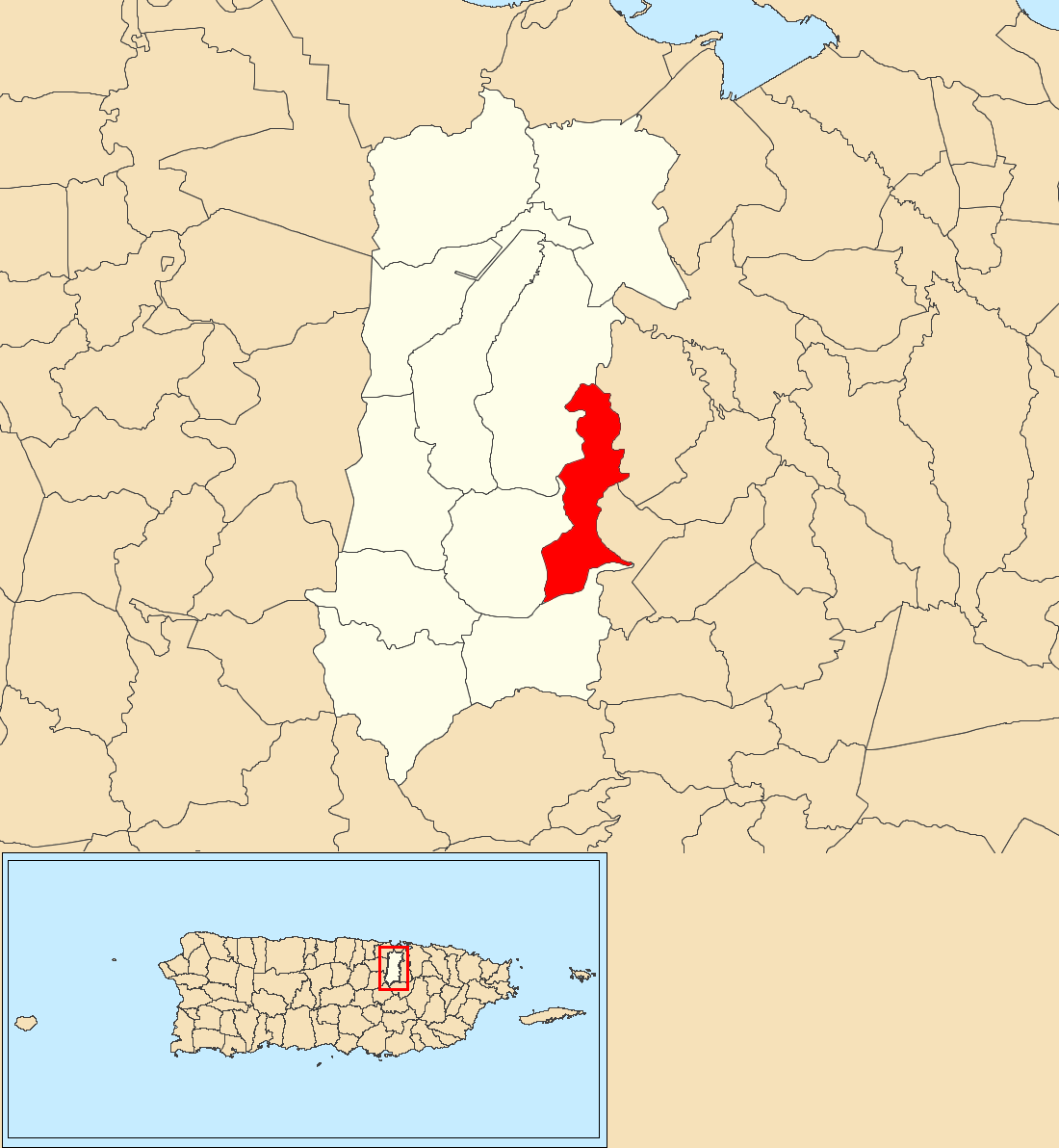
- Location of Guaraguao Abajo within the municipality of Bayamón shown in red

- Location of Puerto Rico
- Coordinates: 18°19′49″N 66°08′39″W
- Commonwealth: Puerto Rico
- Municipality: Bayamón

Area
  - Total: 2.46 sq mi (6.4 km^{2})
  - Land: 2.46 sq mi (6.4 km^{2})
  - Water: 0.00 sq mi (0 km^{2})
- Elevation: 266 ft (81 m)

Population (2010)
  - Total: 8,123
  - Density: 1,213.8/sq mi (468.7/km^{2})
- Source: 2010 Census
- Time zone: UTC−4 (AST)

Guaraguao Abajo is a barrio in the municipality of Bayamón, Puerto Rico. Its population in 2010 was 8,123.

== History ==
Guaraguao Abajo was in Spain's gazetteers until Puerto Rico was ceded by Spain in the aftermath of the Spanish–American War under the terms of the Treaty of Paris of 1898 and became an unincorporated territory of the United States. In 1899, the United States Department of War conducted a census of Puerto Rico finding that the population of Guaraguao Abajo barrio was 837.

Historical population
| Census | Pop. | Note | %± |
|---|---|---|---|
| 1900 | 837 | | — |
| 1910 | 754 | | −9.9% |
| 1920 | 749 | | −0.7% |
| 1930 | 800 | | 6.8% |
| 1940 | 807 | | 0.9% |
| 1950 | 733 | | −9.2% |
| 1960 | 912 | | 24.4% |
| 1970 | 0 | | −100.0% |
| 1980 | 2,627 | | — |
| 1990 | 7,802 | | 197.0% |
| 2000 | 8,494 | | 8.9% |
| 2010 | 8,123 | | −4.4% |
U.S. Decennial Census; 1899 (shown as 1900) 1910-1930; 1930-1950 1980-2000 2010

== See also ==
- List of communities in Puerto Rico
