= Bayamón River =

River of Puerto Rico

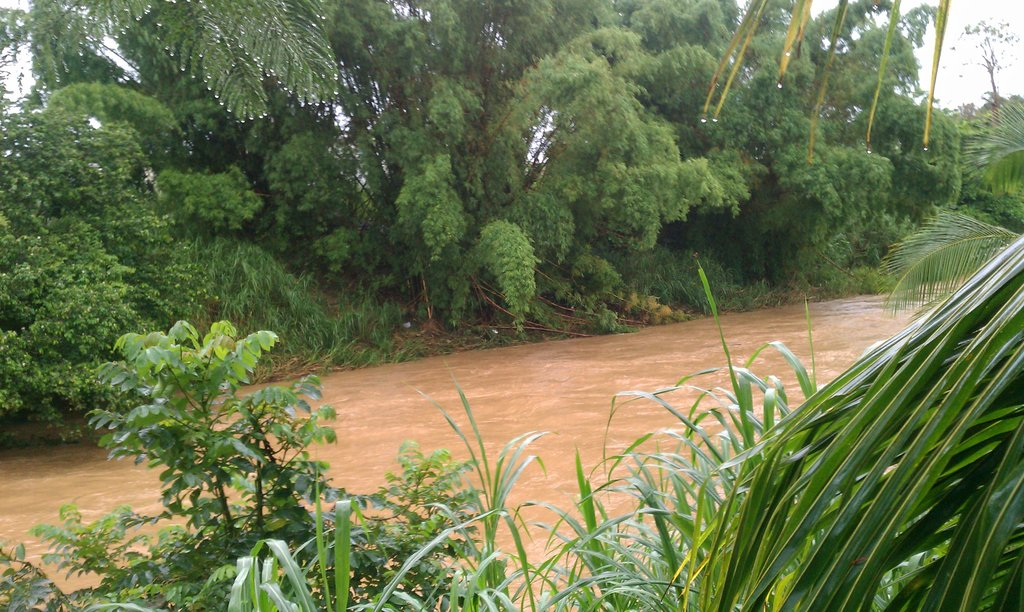
- Río Bayamón
- Native name: Río de Bayamón (Spanish)

Location
- Commonwealth: Puerto Rico
- Municipality: Cidra, Aguas Buenas, Guaynabo, Toa Baja, Bayamón, Cataño

Physical characteristics
- Source
  - elevation: 1476 ft.
- Length: 30.29 miles

The Bayamón River (Spanish: Río de Bayamón) is a river of Puerto Rico beginning at an elevation of approximately 1,476 ft in barrio Beatriz in Cidra, Puerto Rico. It is slightly over 30 miles long and travels through several municipalities: Cidra, Aguas Buenas, Guaynabo, Toa Baja, Bayamón, and Cataño, then empties into San Juan Bay.

== See also ==
- Marqués de la Serna Bridge: NRHP listing in Bayamón, Puerto Rico
- List of rivers of Puerto Rico
