= Santa Olaya, Bayamón, Puerto Rico =

Barrio of Puerto Rico

Santa Olaya
- Barrio
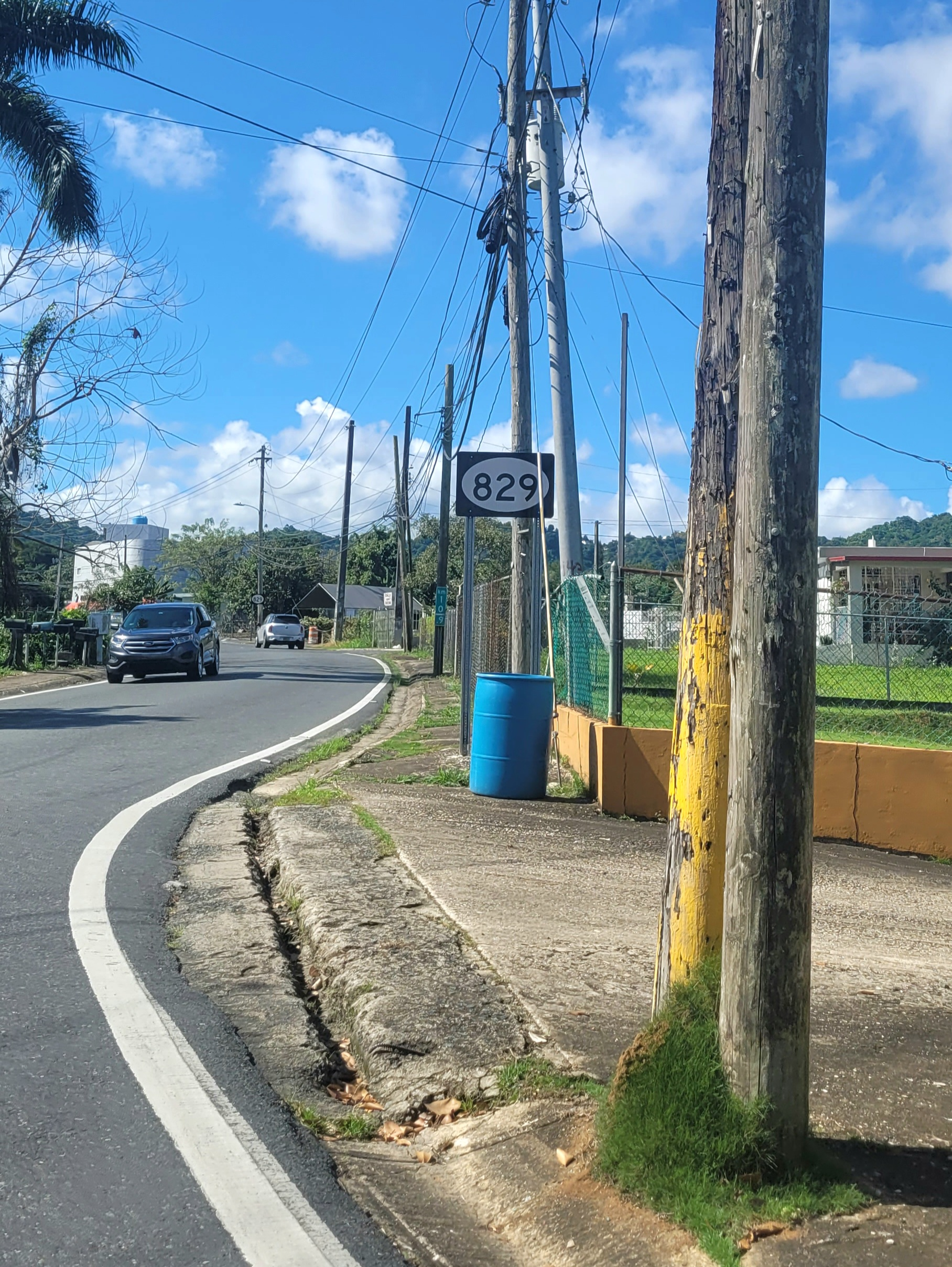
- Puerto Rico Highway 829 in Santa Olaya

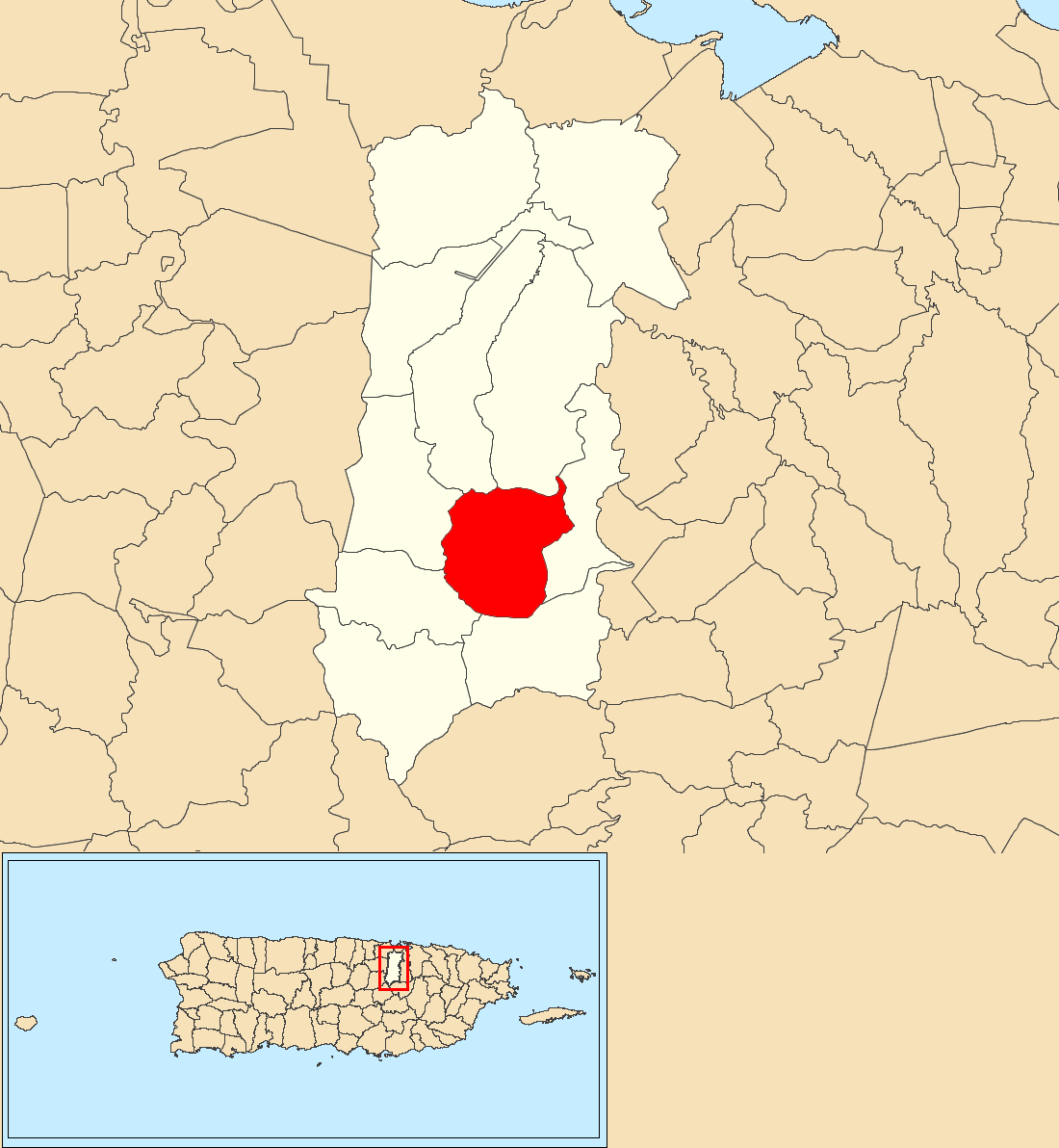
- Location of Santa Olaya within the municipality of Bayamón shown in red

- Location of Puerto Rico in the Caribbean Sea
- Coordinates: 18°19′02″N 66°09′53″W
- Commonwealth: Puerto Rico
- Municipality: Bayamón

Area
  - Total: 3.44 sq mi (8.9 km^{2})
  - Land: 3.44 sq mi (8.9 km^{2})
  - Water: 0.00 sq mi (0 km^{2})
- Elevation: 308 ft (94 m)

Population (2010)
  - Total: 6,057
  - Density: 690.7/sq mi (266.7/km^{2})
- Source: 2010 Census
- Time zone: UTC−4 (AST)

Santa Olaya is a barrio in the municipality of Bayamón, Puerto Rico. Its population in 2010 was 6,057.

== History ==
Santa Olaya was in Spain's gazetteers until Puerto Rico was ceded by Spain in the aftermath of the Spanish–American War under the terms of the Treaty of Paris of 1898 and became an unincorporated territory of the United States. In 1899, the United States Department of War conducted a census of Puerto Rico finding that the population of Santa Olaya barrio was 1,100.

Historical population
Census	Pop.	Note	%±
1900	1,100		—
1910	1,263		14.8%
1920	1,300		2.9%
1930	1,337		2.8%
1940	1,465		9.6%
1950	1,604		9.5%
1960	1,552		−3.2%
1970	2,190		41.1%
1980	3,144		43.6%
1990	4,866		54.8%
2000	5,662		16.4%
2010	6,057		7.0%
U.S. Decennial Census; 1899 (shown as 1900) 1910-1930; 1930-1950 1980-2000 2010

== See also ==
- List of communities in Puerto Rico
