= Nuevo, Bayamón, Puerto Rico =

Barrio of Puerto Rico

Nuevo
- Barrio
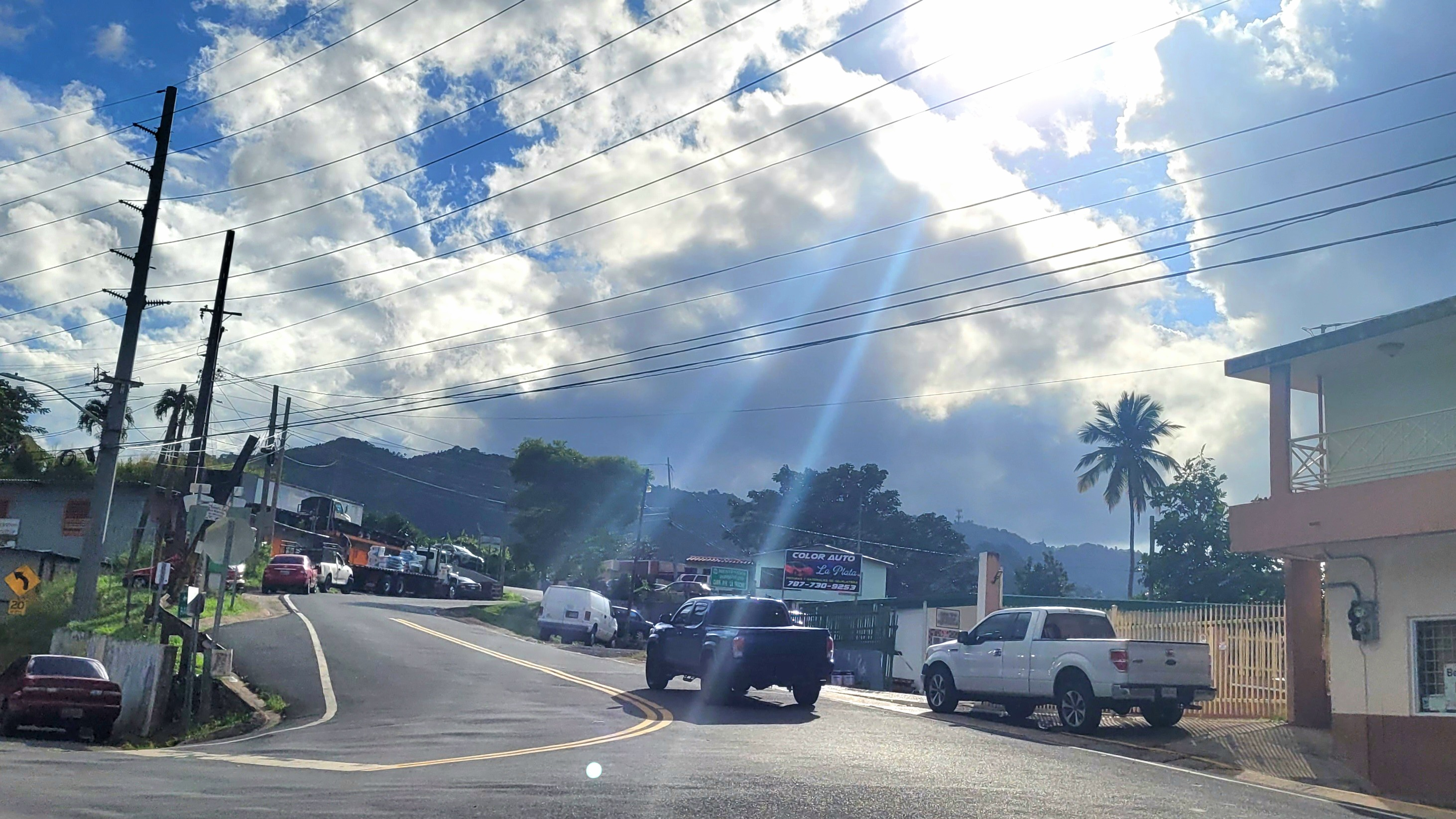
- Puerto Rico Highway 816 between Dajaos and Nuevo

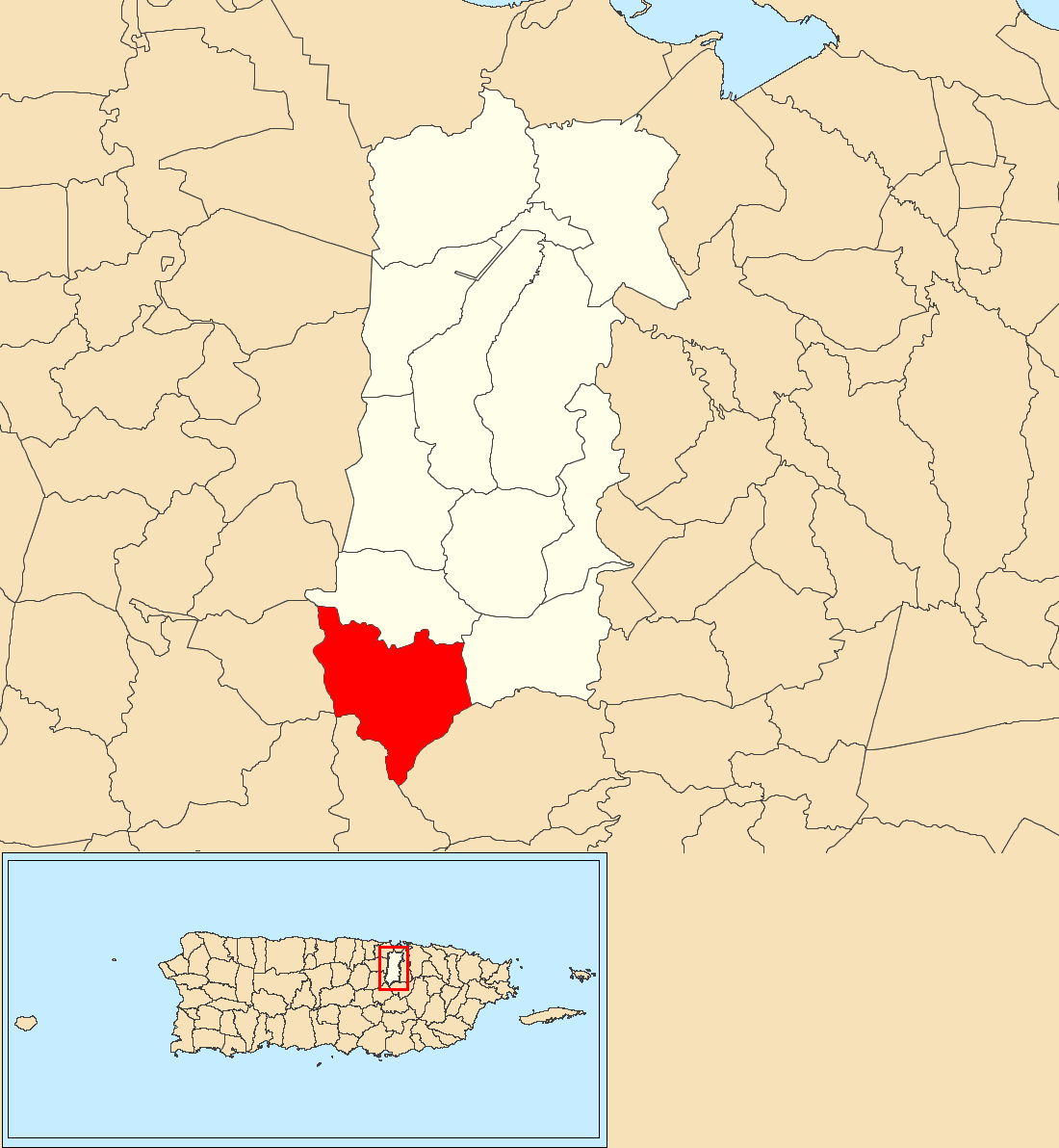
- Location of Nuevo within the municipality of Bayamón shown in red

- Location of Puerto Rico
- Coordinates: 18°17′12″N 66°11′41″W
- Commonwealth: Puerto Rico
- Municipality: Bayamón

Area
  - Total: 4.14 sq mi (10.7 km^{2})
  - Land: 4.10 sq mi (10.6 km^{2})
  - Water: 0.04 sq mi (0.10 km^{2})
- Elevation: 1,093 ft (333 m)

Population (2010)
  - Total: 2,965
  - Density: 274.4/sq mi (105.9/km^{2})
- Source: 2010 Census
- Time zone: UTC−4 (AST)

Nuevo is a barrio in the municipality of Bayamón, Puerto Rico. Its population in 2010 was 2,965.

== History ==
Nuevo was in Spain's gazetteers until Puerto Rico was ceded by Spain in the aftermath of the Spanish–American War under the terms of the Treaty of Paris of 1898 and became an unincorporated territory of the United States. In 1899, the United States Department of War conducted a census of Puerto Rico finding that the population of Nuevo barrio was 1,123.

Historical population
Census	Pop.	Note	%±
1900	1,123		—
1910	1,079		−3.9%
1920	1,365		26.5%
1930	1,446		5.9%
1940	1,633		12.9%
1950	1,501		−8.1%
1960	1,712		14.1%
1970	1,814		6.0%
1980	2,244		23.7%
1990	2,715		21.0%
2000	2,394		−11.8%
2010	2,965		23.9%
U.S. Decennial Census; 1899 (shown as 1900) 1910-1930; 1930-1950 1980-2000 2010

== See also ==
- List of communities in Puerto Rico
