= Guaraguao Arriba, Bayamón, Puerto Rico =

Barrio of Puerto Rico

Guaraguao Arriba
- Barrio
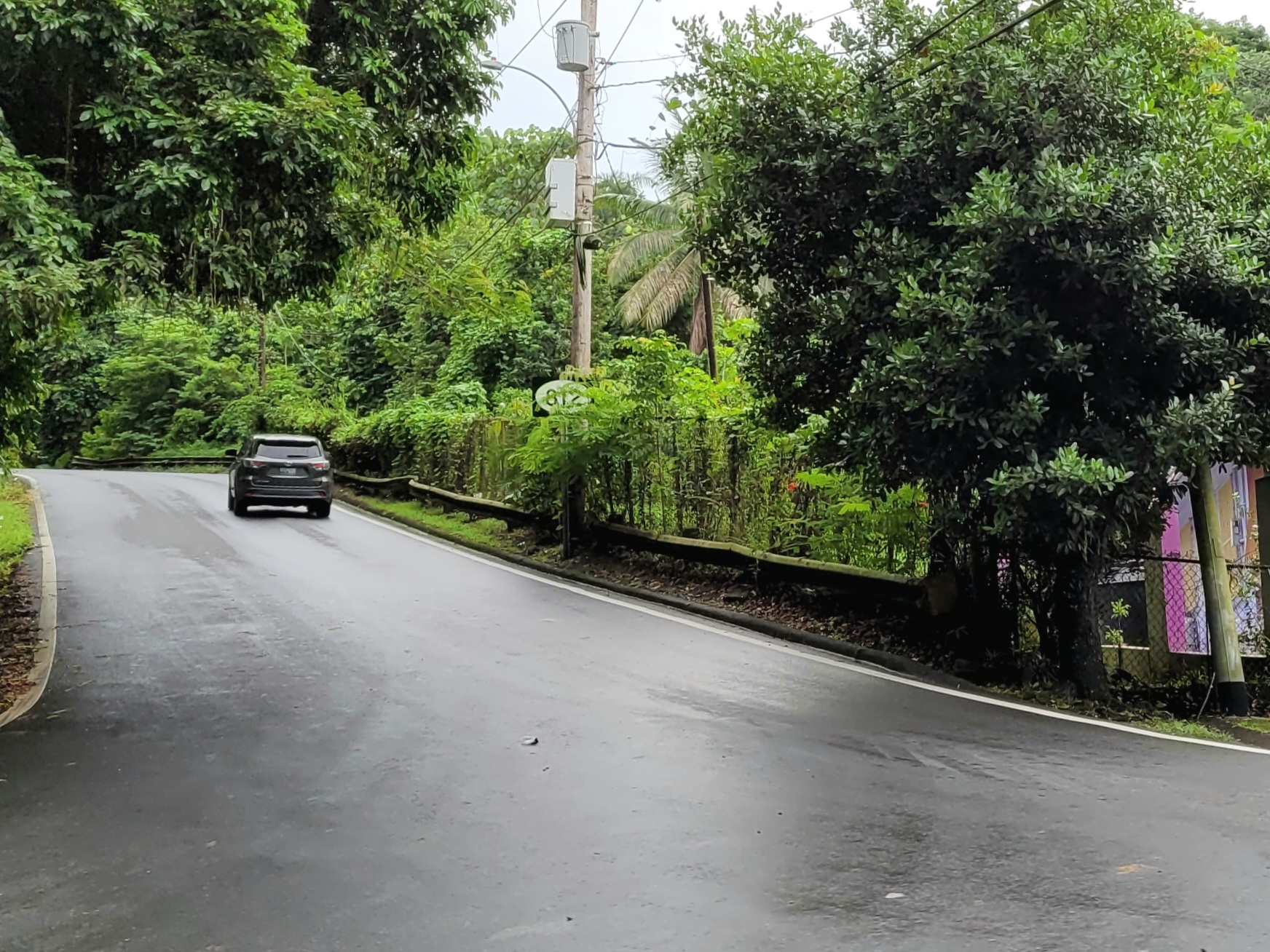
- Puerto Rico Highway 812 in Guaraguao Arriba

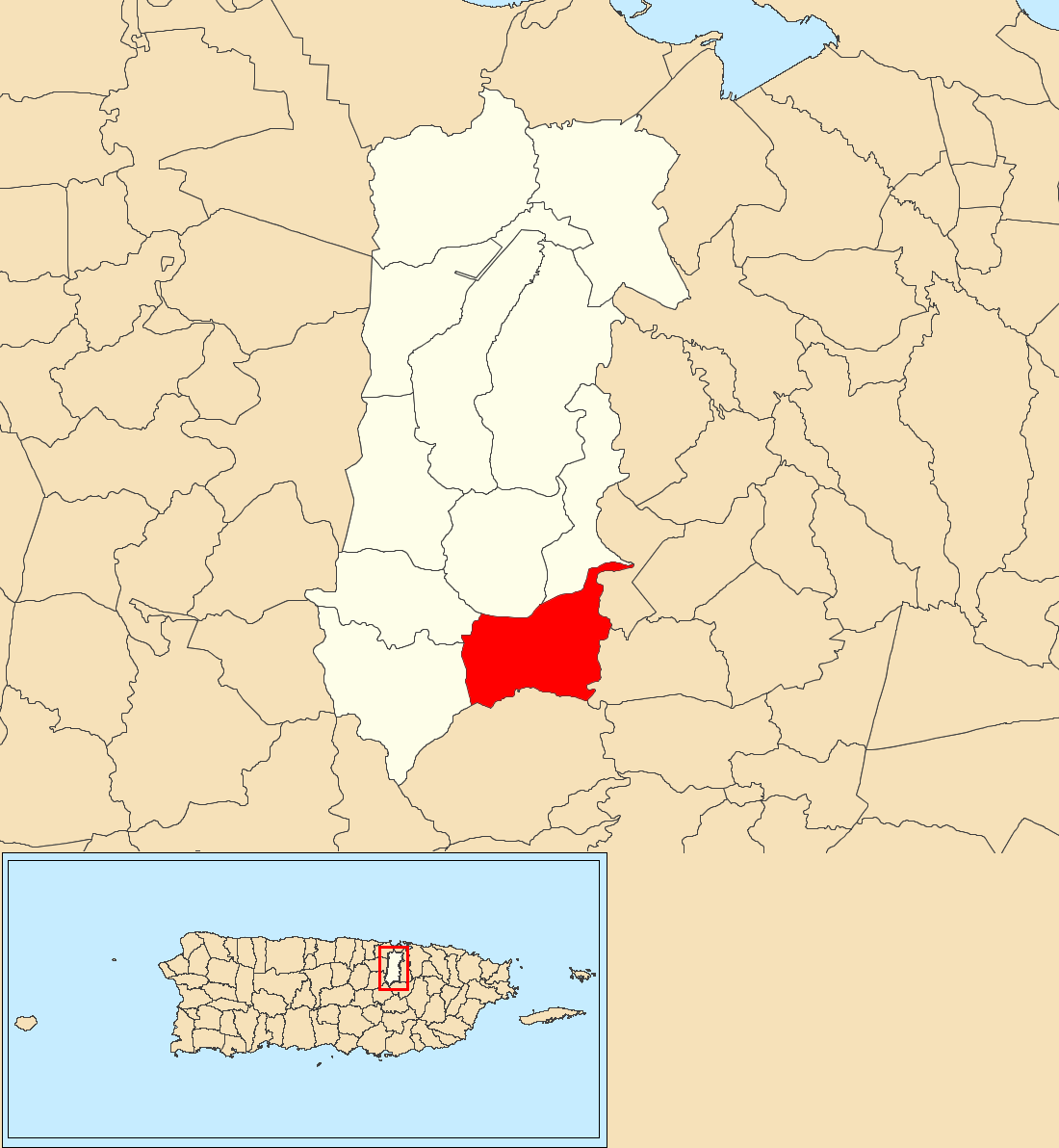
- Location of Guaraguao Arriba within the municipality of Bayamón shown in red

- Location of Puerto Rico
- Coordinates: 18°17′30″N 66°08′57″W
- Commonwealth: Puerto Rico
- Municipality: Bayamón

Area
  - Total: 3.45 sq mi (8.9 km^{2})
  - Land: 3.45 sq mi (8.9 km^{2})
  - Water: 0.00 sq mi (0 km^{2})
- Elevation: 1,388 ft (423 m)

Population (2010)
  - Total: 1,832
  - Density: 207.8/sq mi (80.2/km^{2})
- Source: 2010 Census
- Time zone: UTC−4 (AST)

Guaraguao Arriba is a barrio in the municipality of Bayamón, Puerto Rico. Its population in 2010 was 1,832.

== History ==
Guaraguao Arriba was in Spain's gazetteers until Puerto Rico was ceded by Spain in the aftermath of the Spanish–American War under the terms of the Treaty of Paris of 1898 and became an unincorporated territory of the United States. In 1899, the United States Department of War conducted a census of Puerto Rico finding that the population of Guaraguao Arriba barrio was 681.

Historical population
Census	Pop.	Note	%±
1900	681		—
1910	612		−10.1%
1920	882		44.1%
1930	889		0.8%
1940	926		4.2%
1950	892		−3.7%
1960	1,082		21.3%
1970	758		−29.9%
1980	504		−33.5%
1990	1,748		246.8%
2000	1,681		−3.8%
2010	1,832		9.0%
U.S. Decennial Census; 1899 (shown as 1900) 1910-1930; 1930-1950 1980-2000 2010

== See also ==
- List of communities in Puerto Rico
