= Dajaos, Bayamón, Puerto Rico =

Barrio of Puerto Rico

Dajaos
- Barrio
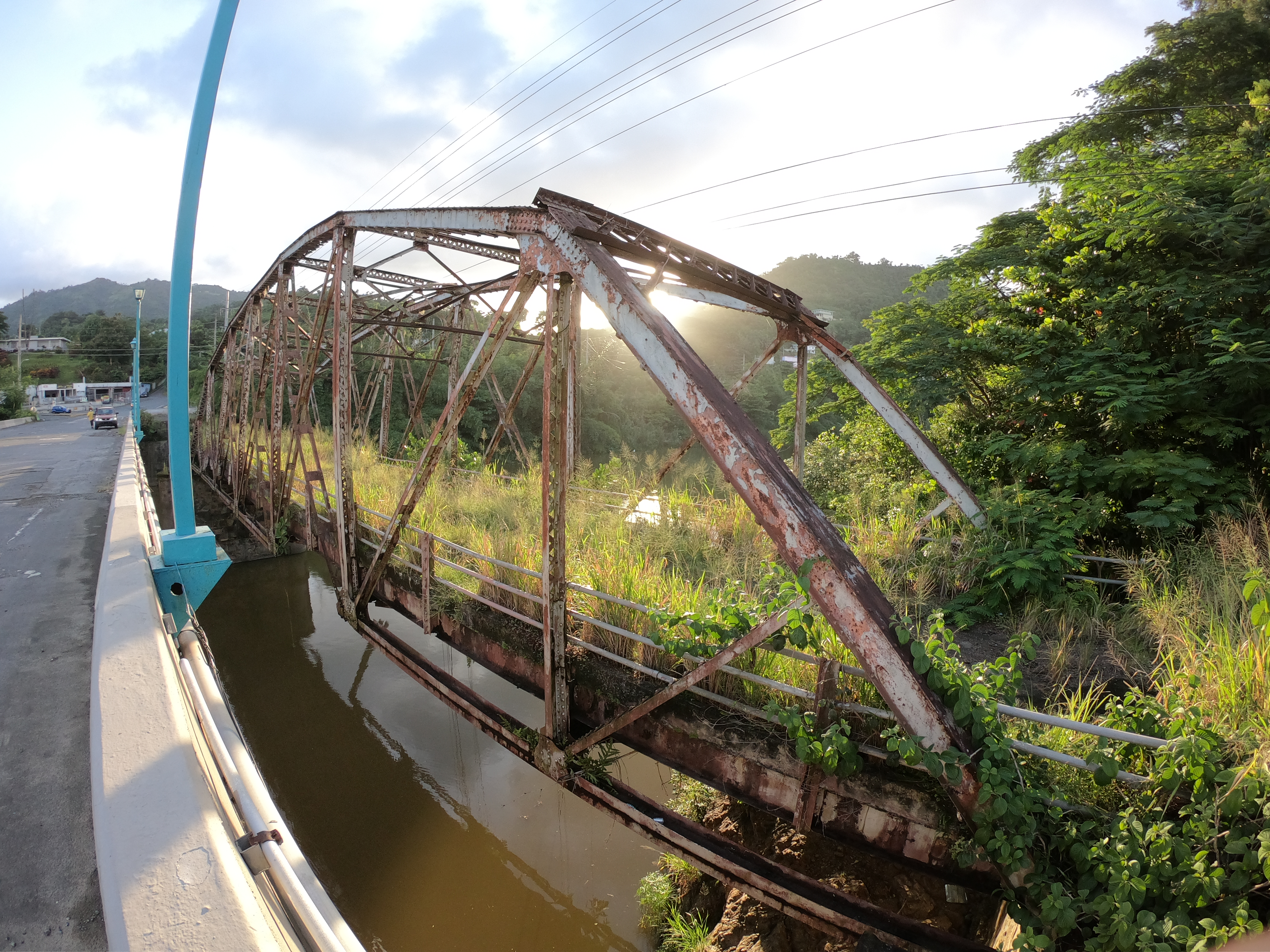
- Plata Bridge between Dajaos and Naranjo

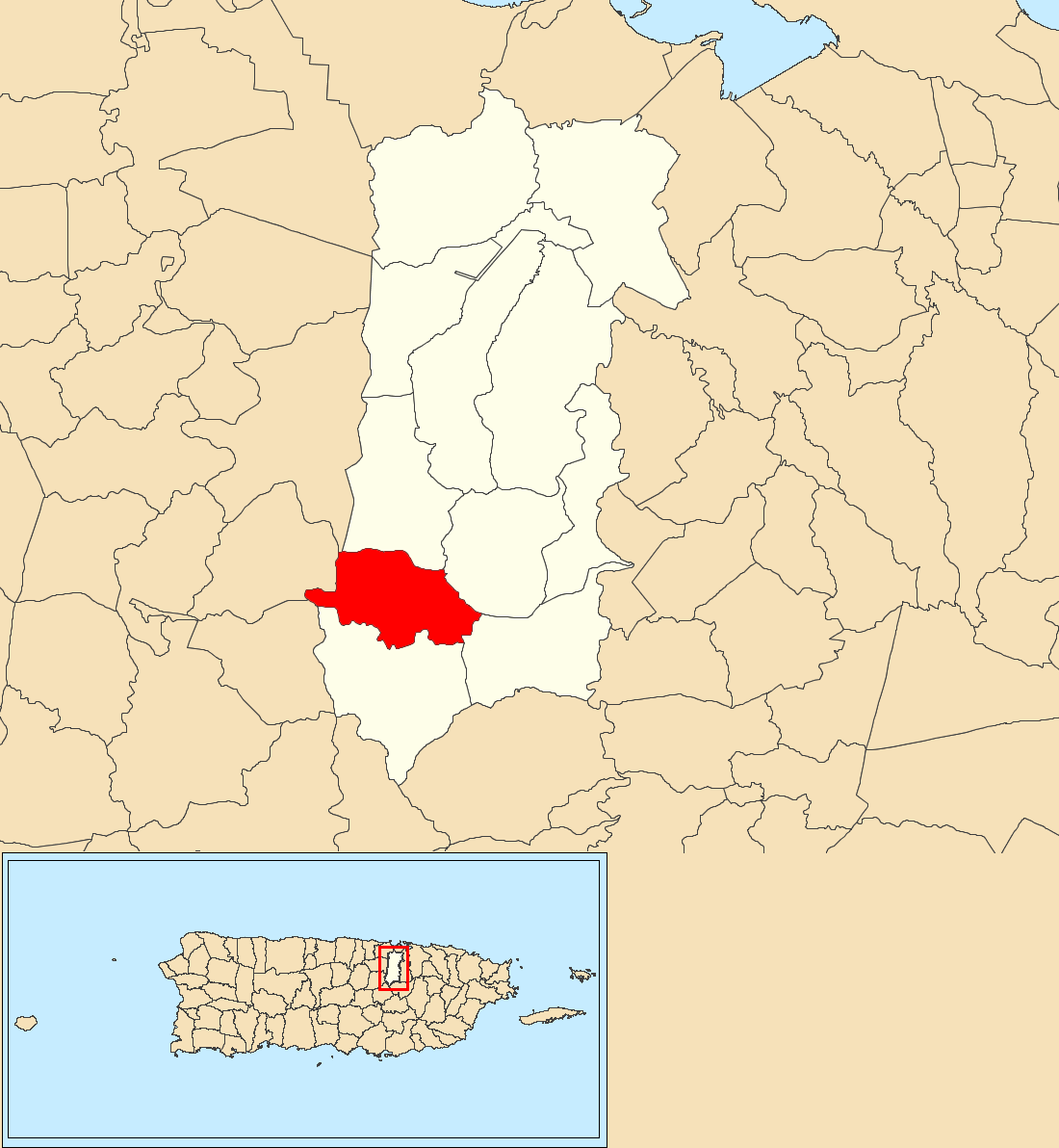
- Location of Dajaos within the municipality of Bayamón shown in red

- Location of Puerto Rico
- Coordinates: 18°18′07″N 66°11′44″W
- Commonwealth: Puerto Rico
- Municipality: Bayamón

Area
  - Total: 2.80 sq mi (7.3 km^{2})
  - Land: 2.78 sq mi (7.2 km^{2})
  - Water: 0.02 sq mi (0.052 km^{2})
- Elevation: 528 ft (161 m)

Population (2010)
  - Total: 2,831
  - Density: 389.2/sq mi (150.3/km^{2})
- Source: 2010 Census
- Time zone: UTC−4 (AST)

Dajaos is a barrio in the municipality of Bayamón, Puerto Rico. Its population in 2010 was 2,831.

== History ==
Dajaos was in Spain's gazetteers until Puerto Rico was ceded by Spain in the aftermath of the Spanish–American War under the terms of the Treaty of Paris of 1898 and became an unincorporated territory of the United States. In 1899, the United States Department of War conducted a census of Puerto Rico finding that the population of Dajaos barrio was 851.

Historical population
Census	Pop.	Note	%±
1900	851		—
1910	1,046		22.9%
1920	1,081		3.3%
1930	1,064		−1.6%
1940	1,235		16.1%
1950	1,404		13.7%
1960	1,427		1.6%
1970	1,511		5.9%
1980	1,605		6.2%
1990	2,536		58.0%
2000	2,691		6.1%
2010	2,831		5.2%
U.S. Decennial Census; 1899 (shown as 1900) 1910-1930; 1930-1950 1980-2000 2010

== See also ==
- List of communities in Puerto Rico
