= Guaraguao, Guaynabo, Puerto Rico =

Barrio of Puerto Rico

Guaraguao
- Barrio
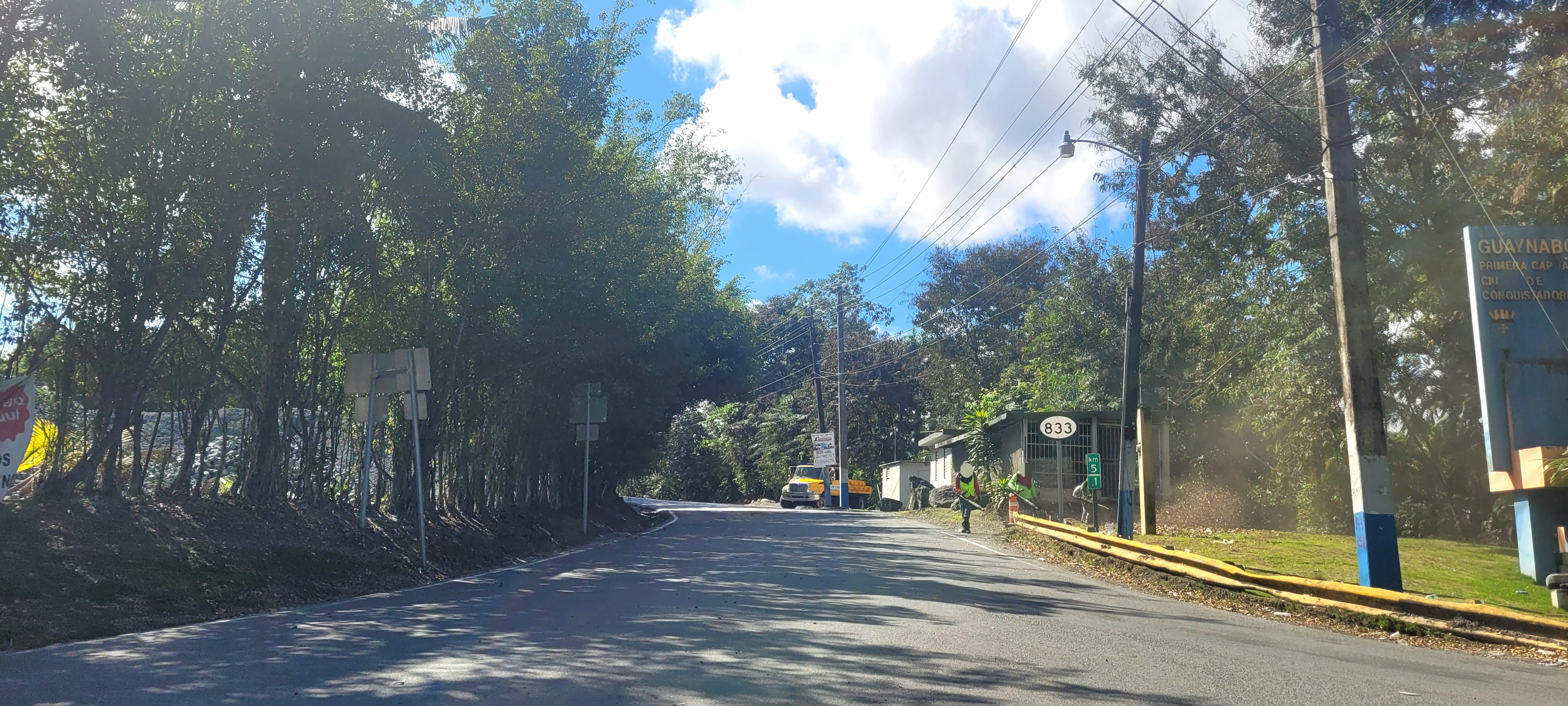
- Puerto Rico Highway 833 in Guaraguao

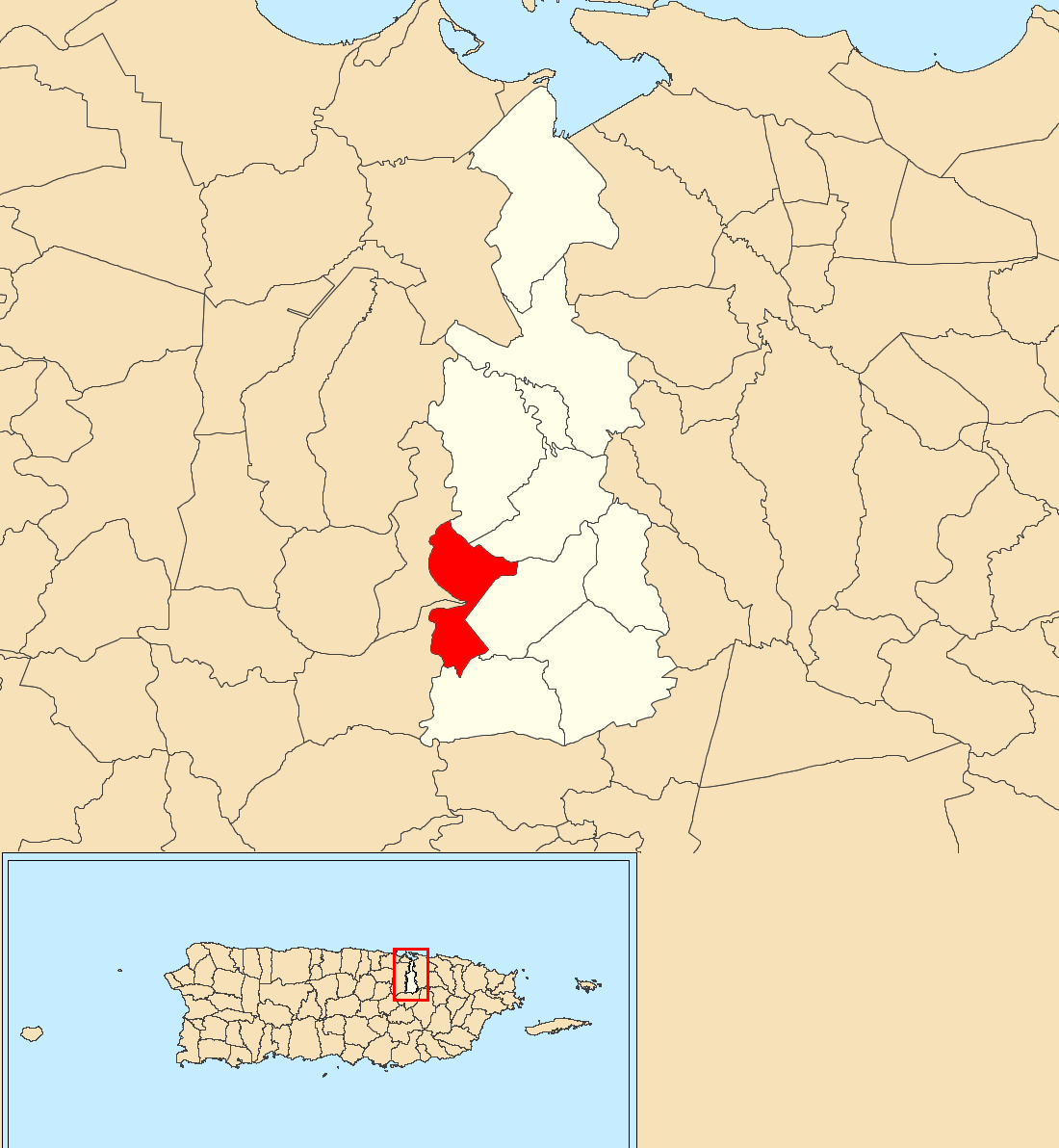
- Location of Guaraguao within the municipality of Guaynabo shown in red

- Location of Puerto Rico
- Coordinates: 18°18′55″N 66°08′02″W
- Commonwealth: Puerto Rico
- Municipality: Guaynabo

Area
  - Total: 1.75 sq mi (4.5 km^{2})
  - Land: 1.75 sq mi (4.5 km^{2})
  - Water: 0 sq mi (0 km^{2})
- Elevation: 282 ft (86 m)

Population (2010)
  - Total: 4,178
  - Density: 2,387.4/sq mi (921.8/km^{2})
- Source: 2010 Census
- Time zone: UTC−4 (AST)

Guaraguao is a barrio in the municipality of Guaynabo, Puerto Rico. Its population in 2010 was 4,178.

== History ==
Guaraguao was in Spain's gazetteers until Puerto Rico was ceded by Spain in the aftermath of the Spanish–American War under the terms of the Treaty of Paris of 1898 and became an unincorporated territory of the United States. In 1899, the United States Department of War conducted a census of Puerto Rico finding that the population of Guaraguao barrio was 763.

Historical population
Census	Pop.	Note	%±
1900	763		—
1910	695		−8.9%
1920	917		31.9%
1930	923		0.7%
1940	943		2.2%
1950	1,246		32.1%
1960	1,429		14.7%
1970	1,852		29.6%
1980	3,410		84.1%
1990	4,042		18.5%
2000	4,145		2.5%
2010	4,178		0.8%
U.S. Decennial Census; 1899 (shown as 1900) 1910-1930; 1930-1950 1980-2000 2010

== Sectors ==
Barrios (which are, in contemporary times, roughly comparable to minor civil divisions) in turn are further subdivided into smaller local populated place areas/units called sectores (sectors in English). The types of sectores may vary, from normally sector to urbanización to reparto to barriada to residencial, among others.

The following sectors are in Guaraguao barrio:

Calle Ceiba, Calle Diamante, Calle Flamboyán, Calle Jazmín, Calle La Vega, Calle Laguna, Calle Manantial, Calle Peña, Calle Rosado, Calle Saturno, Parcelas López Caces, Sector Benito Guzmán, Sector Cabrera, Sector Carrillo, Sector Corea, Sector Elipio Pérez, Sector Estrella, Sector Figueroa, Sector Guerra, Sector Juana Ramos, Sector La Brecha, Sector La Muralla, Sector La Vega, Sector Landrau, Sector Los Báez, Sector Los Cintrón, Sector Los Lagunas, Sector Los Motores, Sector Los Sánchez, Sector Monte Comunal, Sector Peña, Sector Puerto Nuevo, Sector Romero, Sector Villa Isleña, and Urbanización Nieves Padilla.

== See also ==
- List of communities in Puerto Rico
- List of barrios and sectors of Guaynabo, Puerto Rico
