= Bayamón, Puerto Rico =

City and municipality in Puerto Rico

Bayamón Municipio Autónomo de Bayamón
- City and municipality
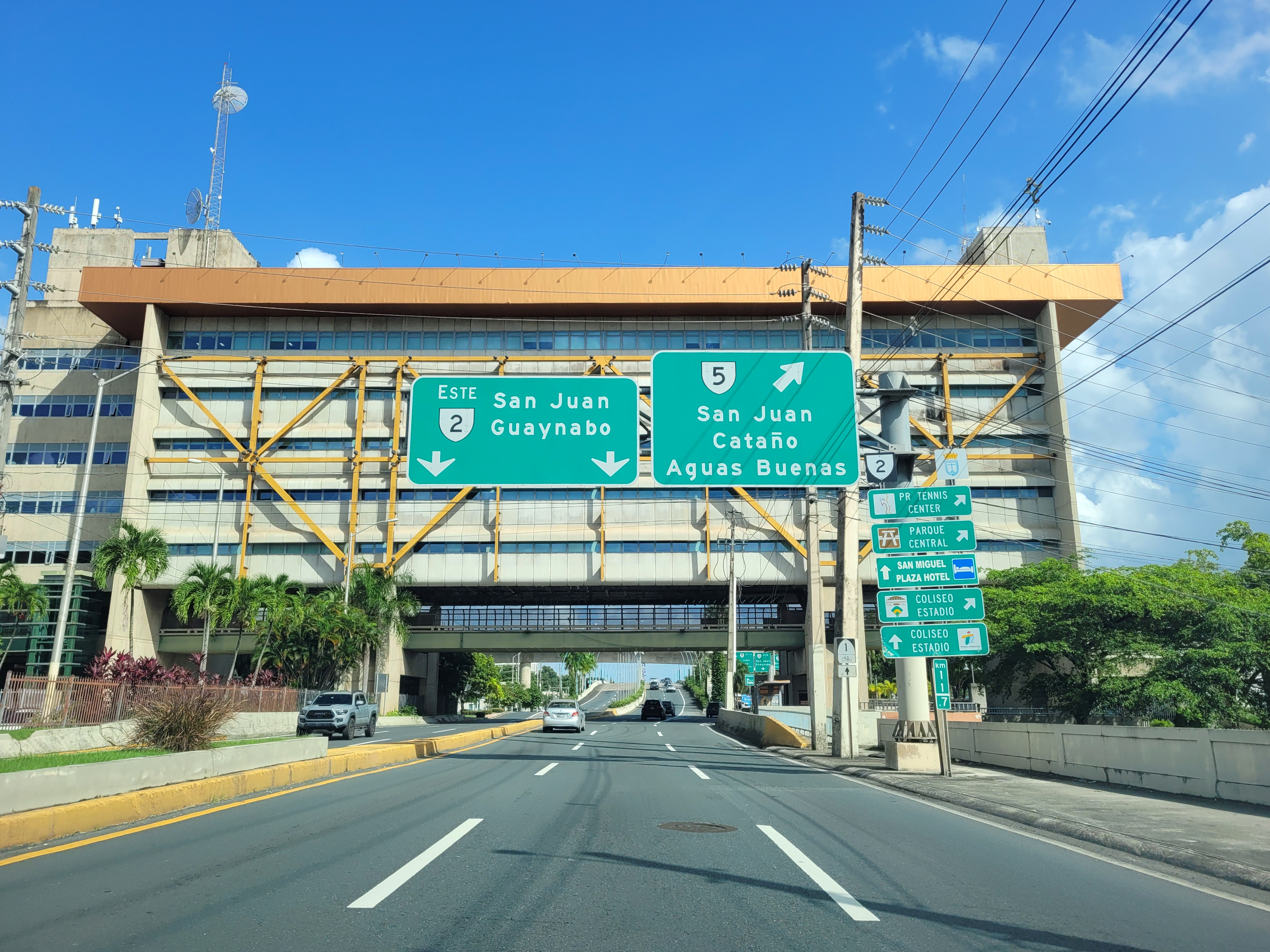
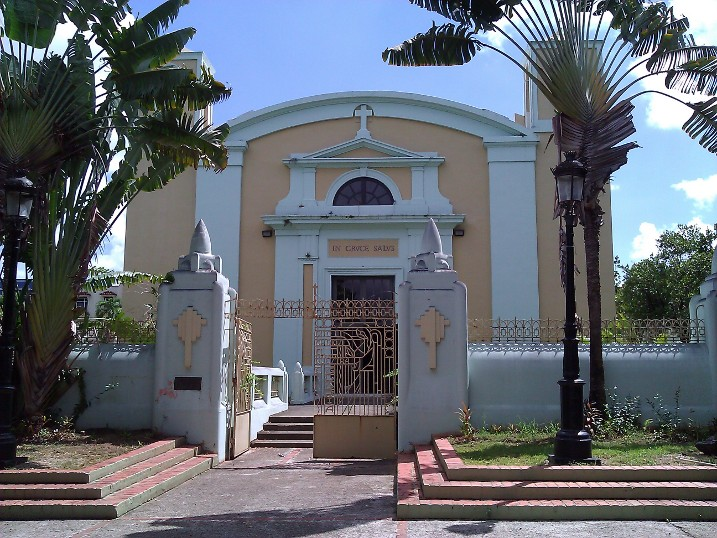
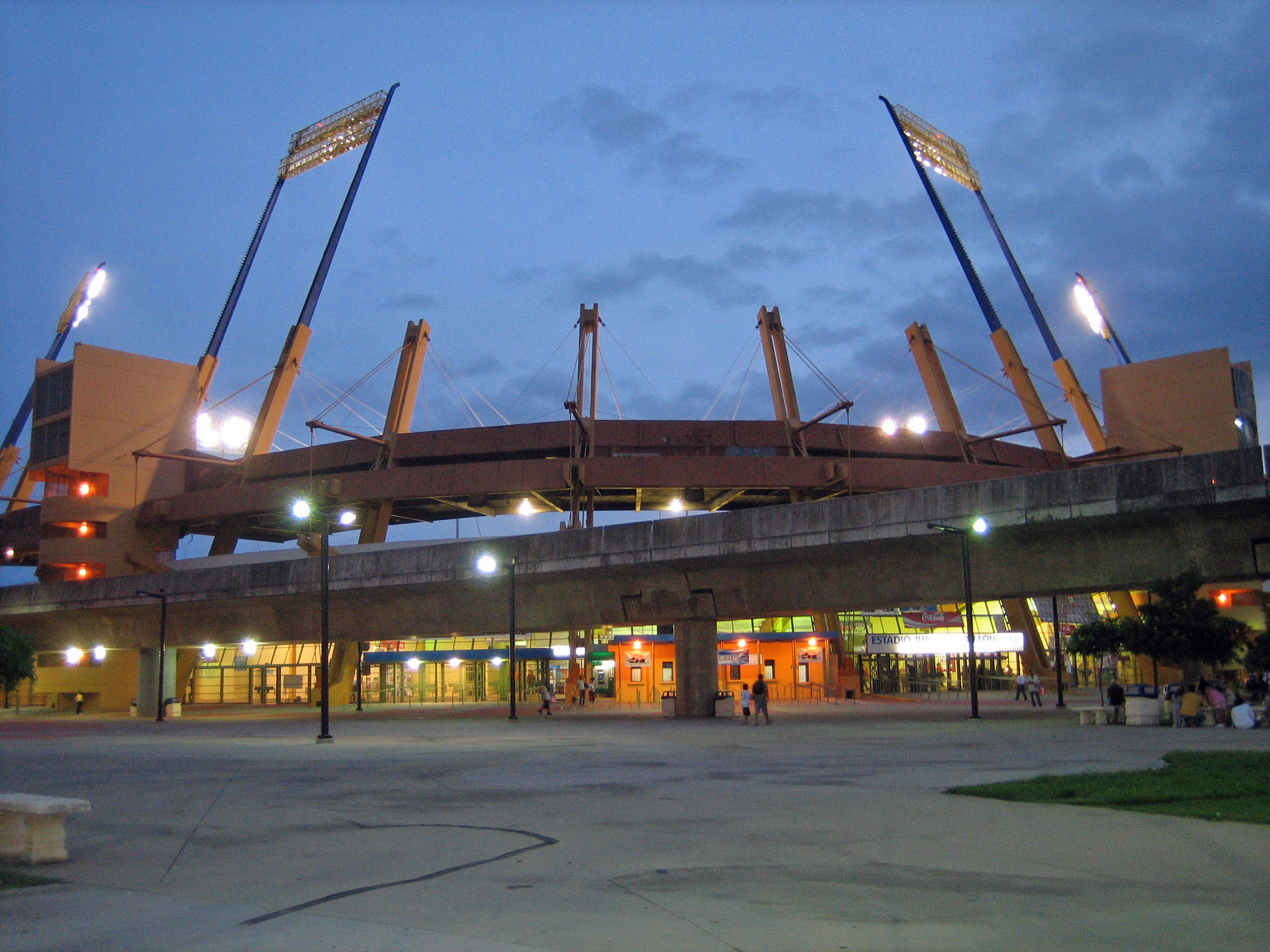
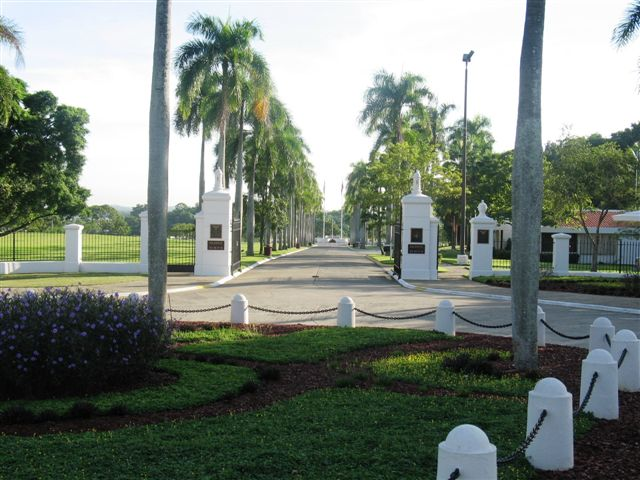
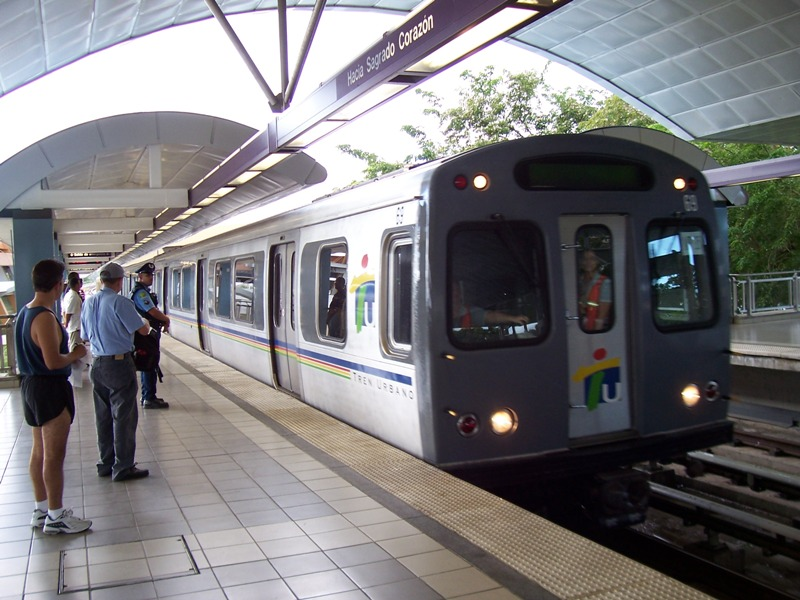
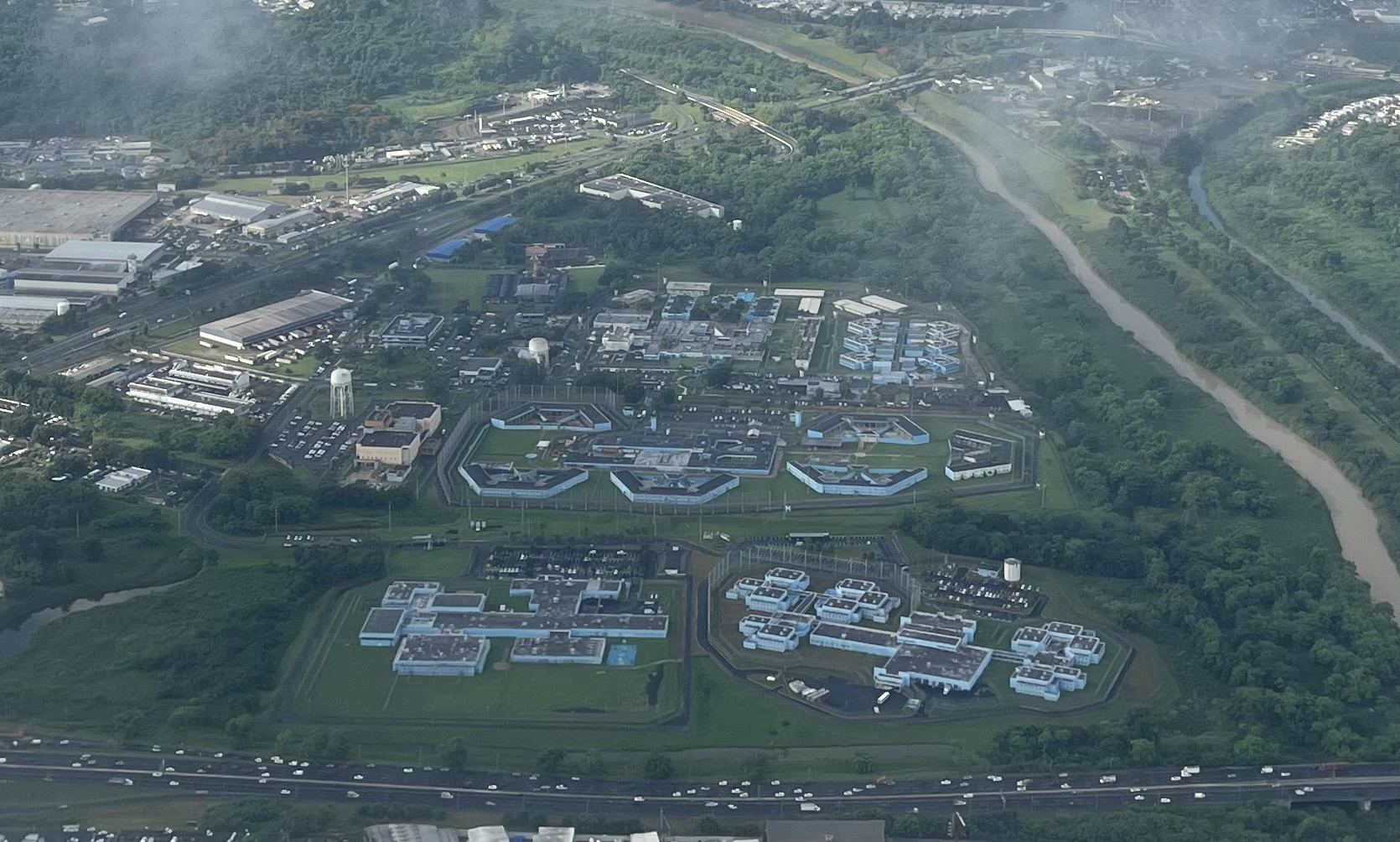
- Casa Alcaldía de Bayamón above PR-2 Invención de la Santa Cruz Parish Juan Ramón Loubriel Stadium Puerto Rico National Cemetery Tren Urbano at Deportivo station Bayamón Correctional Complex

- Flag Coat of arms
- Nicknames: "La Ciudad del Chicharrón" (The Porkrind City), "La Ciudad de Vaqueros" (The City of Cowboys), La Ciudad de las Ciencias ("The City of Science"), "La Ciudad del Tapón" (The City of Traffic Jams)
- Motto: In Hoc Signo Vinces (Latin for: "By this sign you will conquer")
- Anthem: "Bayamón, ciudad hermosa"
- Interactive map of Bayamón
- Location within Puerto Rico Location within the Caribbean
- Coordinates: 18°22′48″N 66°09′48″W
- Sovereign state: United States
- Commonwealth: Puerto Rico
- Settled: 16th century
- Founded: May 22, 1772
- Founder: Don Juan Ramírez de Arellano
- Barrios: 12 barrios: Buena Vista; Cerro Gordo; Dajaos; Guaraguao Abajo; Guaraguao Arriba; Hato Tejas; Juan Sánchez; Minillas; Nuevo; Pájaros; Bayamón barrio-pueblo; Santa Olaya

Government
  - Mayor: Ramón Luis Rivera Jr. (PNP)
  - Senatorial dist.: 2 – Bayamón
  - Representative dist.: 7, 8, 9

Area
  - Total: 44.53 sq mi (115.34 km^{2})
  - Land: 44.38 sq mi (114.95 km^{2})
  - Water: 0.15 sq mi (0.39 km^{2})
- Elevation: 52 ft (16 m)

Population (2020)
  - Total: 185,187
  - Estimate (2025): 180,562 ▼
  - Rank: 2nd in Puerto Rico
  - Density: 4,172.5/sq mi (1,611.0/km^{2})
- Demonym(s): Bayamonese (neutral); Bayamonés (masculine); Bayamonesa (feminine)
- Time zone: UTC-4 (AST)
- ZIP Codes: 00956, 00957, 00959, 00961, 00960, 00958
- Area code: 787/939
- Website: municipiodebayamon.com

Bayamón (Spanish pronunciation: [baʝaˈmon], locally [baʝaˈmoŋ]) is a city and municipality in Puerto Rico. Located on the northeastern coastal plain, it is bounded by Guaynabo to the east, Toa Alta and Naranjito to the west, Toa Baja and Cataño to the north, and Aguas Buenas and Comerío to the south. Part of the San Juan metropolitan area, Bayamón is spread over 11 barrios and the downtown area and administrative center of Bayamón Pueblo. With a population of 185,187 as of the 2020 census, it is the second most populated municipality in the archipelago and island after the capital of San Juan.

== Etymology and nicknames ==
Two theories exist about the origin of the name Bayamón. According to one, it was named after the local cacique, Bahamon. The other theory states the name was derived from the Taino word Bayamongo, which is the native name of the river that runs across this region, implying that Bayamón is the area around this main river, which later on became the center of the city's development.

Bayamón is nicknamed "City of the Chicharrón" or "Pork Rind City" (Ciudad del Chicharrón) after the popular fried dish, locally known as chicharrón volao, that is often sold as street food. Other nicknames include "City of Cowboys" (Ciudad de Vaqueros), after the local sports team, "City of the Sciences" (Ciudad de las Ciencias) after the popular tourist educational attraction, and, more recently, "Stopper City" or Ciudad del Tapón, due to the high amounts of road traffic congestion there.

== History ==
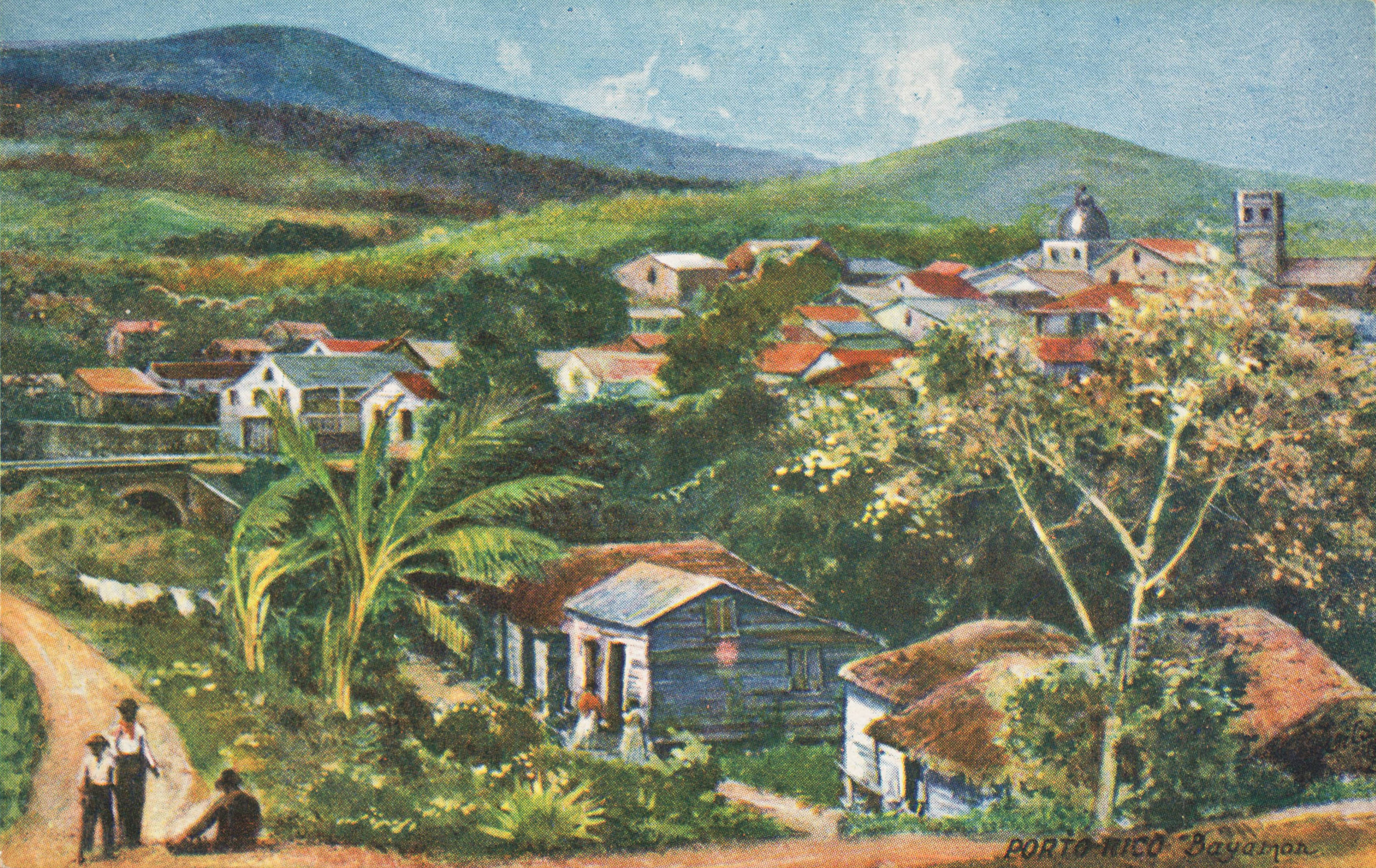
Postcard from 1903 depicting Bayamón

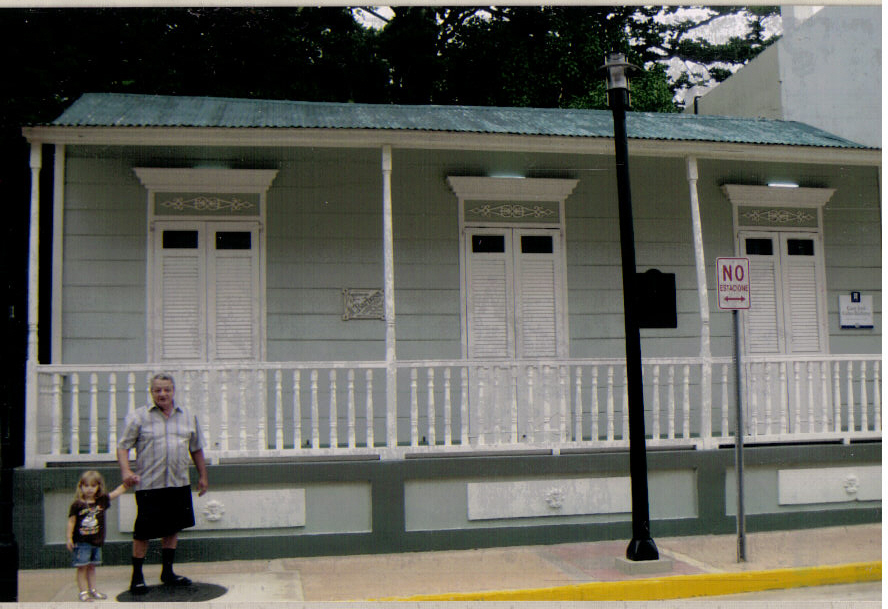
Historic house where José Celso Barbosa was born

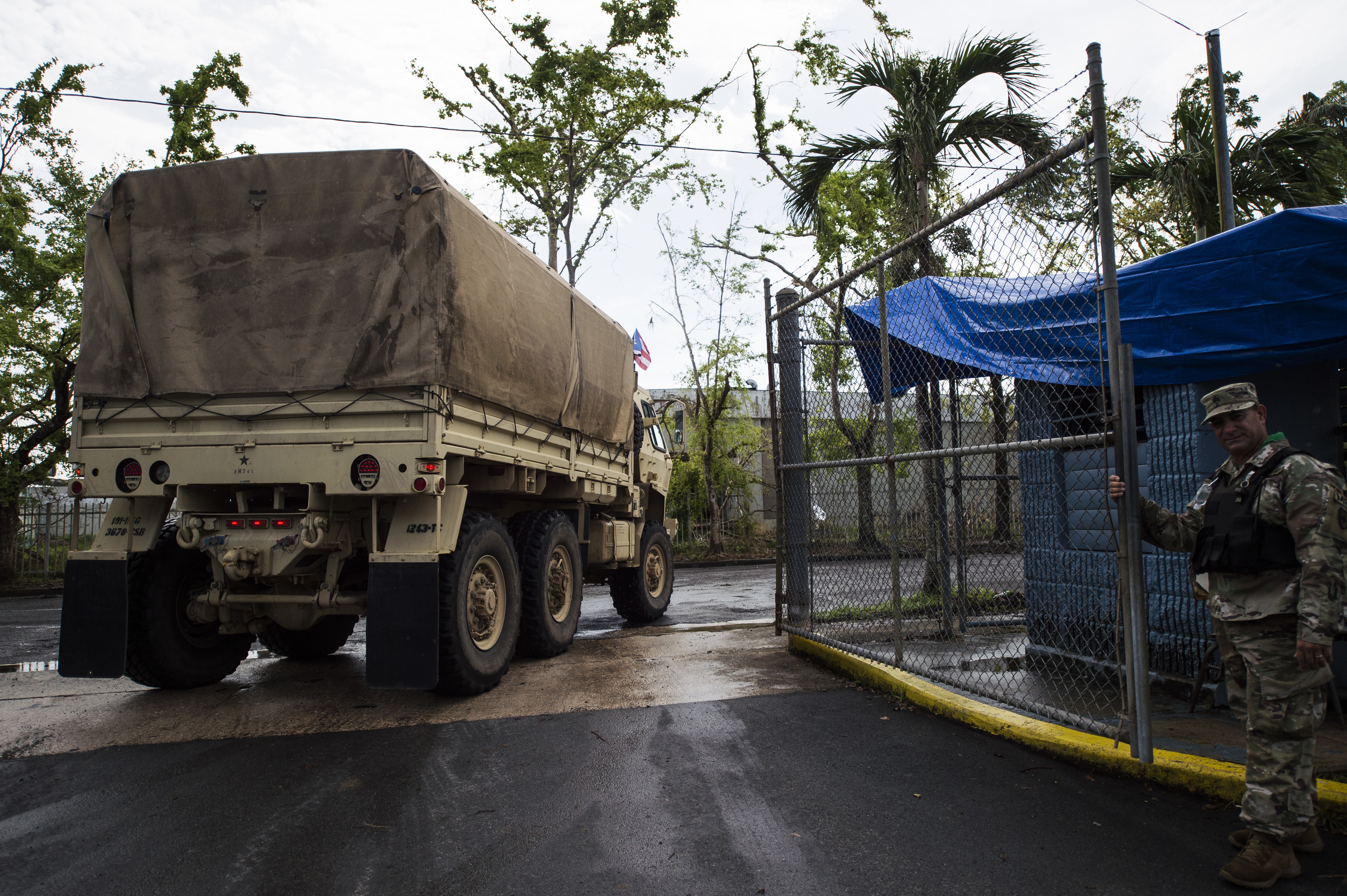
Hurricane Maria relief efforts in Bayamón on Oct. 17

The Taino, the indigenous peoples who encountered European explorers and settlers, were the long-time settlers in this area. Before the foundation of the municipality, Hacienda Santa Cruz was established near the Bayamón River in 1750. The Spanish colonist Juan Ramírez de Arellano formally established Bayamón as a Spanish settlement on May 22, 1772, on a hill known as Alto del Embarcadero. The establishment of its current parish church on that same spot also dates to this year.

In 1821, Marcos Xiorro, an African slave, planned to lead a revolt against the sugarcane plantation owners and the Spanish colonial government in Puerto Rico. The slave conspiracy was revealed and suppressed, but Xiorro became a hero among the slaves. He is part of Puerto Rico's folklore. Marco Xiorro was owned by Vicente Andino, a militia captain who owned a sugarcane plantation in Bayamón.

An earthquake in 1867 caused damages in Bayamón, particularly to its parish church.

Puerto Rico was ceded by Spain in the aftermath of the Spanish–American War under the terms of the Treaty of Paris of 1898 and became a territory of the United States. In 1899, the United States Department of War conducted a census of Puerto Rico finding that the population of Bayamón was 19,940.

The city grew considerably during the start of the 20th century. The area became home to numerous factories specializing in textiles, fertilizer, aluminum between 1901 and 1920. During this time the city also became home to financial institutions such as the Puerto Rico Commercial Bank (Banco Comercial de Puerto Rico), the American Colonial Bank, the First National City Bank of New York, the Chase Manhattan Bank and the Banco Popular de Puerto Rico. This developed and strengthened Bayamón's economy and turned it into both an industrial and commercial hub. The city's infrastructure also developed with the establishment of a bigger sewer system. The city was also host to some of the events of the VIII Pan American Games in 1979.

Hurricane Maria struck Puerto Rico on September 20, 2017, causing large-scale damage and destruction to infrastructure. Numerous landslides occurred in Bayamón as a result of the hurricane's significant amount of rainfall. In Bayamón, around 300 homes were destroyed, and two people were killed by Hurricane María. Many municipal buildings, and the Goya Foods factory in Bayamón sustained significant damage.

== Geography ==
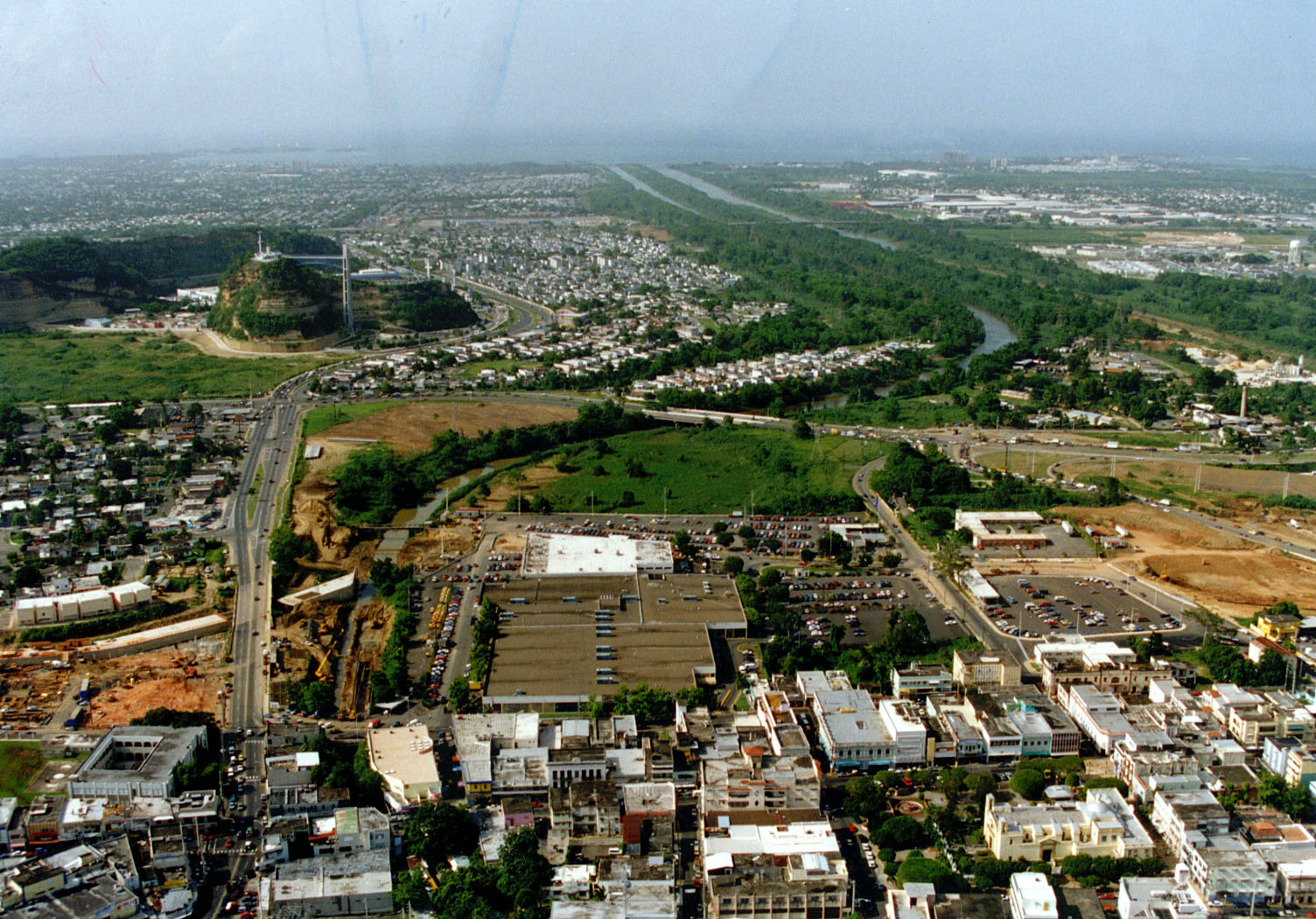
Aerial view of northern Bayamón with mogote formations of the Northern Karst Belt and mouth of the Bayamón River visible, 1999

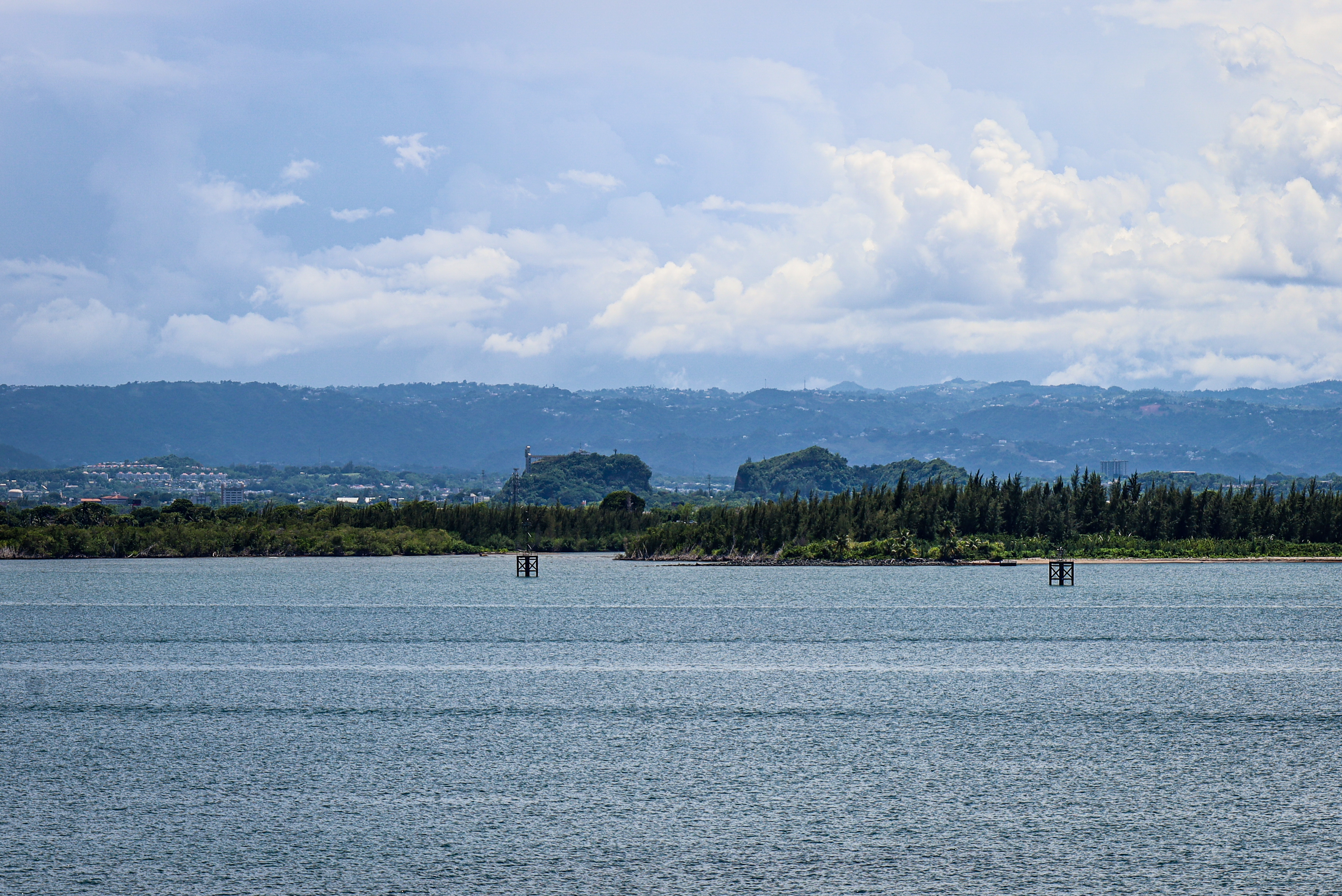
Bayamón karst relief from Old San Juan

Cerro La Peña in Guaraguao Arriba, the highest point in the municipality of Bayamón.

Bayamón lies on the northern coastal plain region and Northern Karst Belt in northeastern Puerto Rico. It is bordered by the municipalities of Toa Baja, Cataño, Comerío, Aguas Buenas, Toa Alta, Naranjito, and Guaynabo. Bayamón has a surface area of 43.5 square miles (113.1 km^{2}). The terrain is mostly flat with prominent limestone hills (mogotes) such as Monte de Santa Ana, but it does include some high foothills of the Cordillera Central such as Cerro La Peña (the highest point in the municipality at 1837 ft. or 560 m), and Cerro Vergaras.

Bayamón is Puerto Rico's second-most populous municipality and is part of the large metropolitan area centered around San Juan. Other cities included in the metropolitan area are Guaynabo, Cataño, Toa Baja, Canóvanas, Carolina and Trujillo Alto. Bayamón is served by the Luis Muñoz Marín International Airport. Despite the city's size, it has no weather station.

=== Water features ===
The rivers that pass through Bayamón include the Río Bayamón, Río Hondo, Río Minillas, Río Bucarabones and Río Cuesta Arriba.

=== Barrios ===
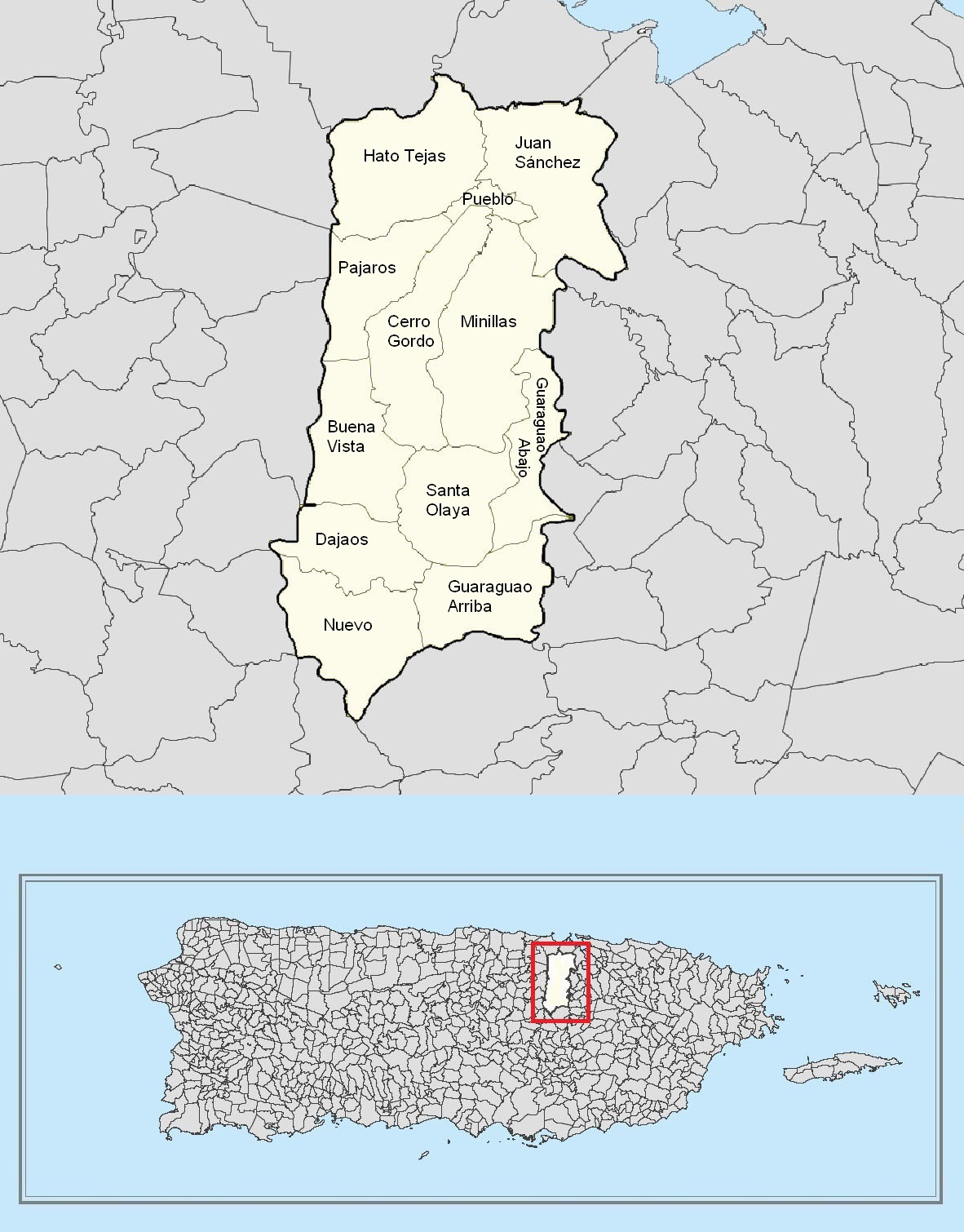
Subdivisions of Bayamón

Like all municipalities of Puerto Rico, Bayamón is subdivided into barrios. The municipal buildings, central square and large Catholic church are located in a small barrio referred to as "el pueblo".

1. Bayamón barrio-pueblo
2. Buena Vista
3. Cerro Gordo
4. Dajaos
5. Guaraguao Abajo
6. Guaraguao Arriba
7. Hato Tejas
8. Juan Sánchez
9. Minillas
10. Nuevo
11. Pájaros
12. Santa Olaya

=== Sectors ===
Barrios (which are, in contemporary times, roughly comparable to minor civil divisions) and subbarrios, are further subdivided into smaller areas called sectores (sectors in English). The types of sectores may vary, from normally sector to urbanización to reparto to barriada to residencial, among others.

=== Special Communities ===
Comunidades Especiales de Puerto Rico (Special Communities of Puerto Rico) are marginalized communities whose citizens are experiencing a certain amount of social exclusion. A map shows these communities occur in nearly every municipality of the commonwealth. Of the 742 places that were on the list in 2014, the following barrios, communities, sectors, or neighborhoods were in Bayamón: Abra Estrecha, Barriada Vista Alegre, Juan Sánchez, Nuevo, Bda. Cedeño in Pájaros, Collores in Santa Olaya, Corea, Dajaos, El Chícharo, Sector Gandul, El Volcán, La Cambija, La Caridad, La Morenita, Los Viejitos, Papito, Sergio Reyes, Parcelas Sabanas, and Punta Brava.

== Tourism ==
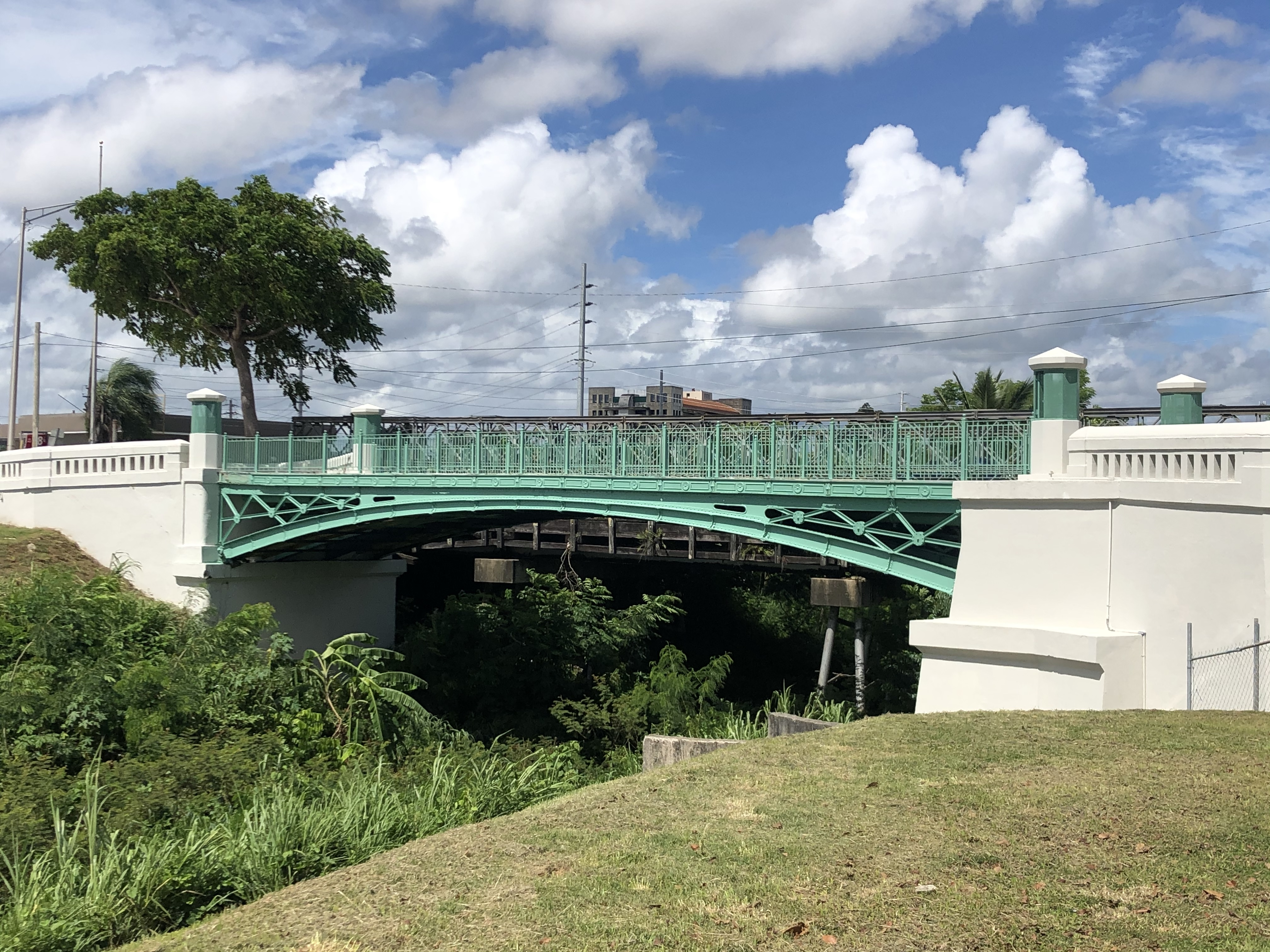
Marqués de la Serna Bridge in Bayamón's City Center, built in 1869. It is the first metal bridge to have been built in the island, and the only metal arch bridge that exists in Puerto Rico.

Bayamón is the site of several notable Puerto Rican landmarks and places of interest. Bayamón Central Park is a public park where people gather and relax. Bayamon also hosts the Braulio Castillo Theater, the Francisco Oller Museum, and the José Celso Barbosa Monument. The Casa Alcaldía de Bayamón is notable by being built across a major divided highway. While walking through a connecting corridor, right above the road, pedestrians can see passing cars underneath. It is believed to be the only building of its class in the world.

One of the most popular attractions in Bayamón is the Parque de las Ciencias. It is a science-themed park with various exhibitions and attractions. It is located in the middle of karstic hills. An observation building on one of the hills provides a good view of the metropolitan area. The building hosts antennas for government and civil communication.

El parque del tren was a park featuring what was then Puerto Rico's only working train. It featured a DC-3, which had been used by United Airlines. In 2001, the park was dismantled and destroyed in the course of major road construction. What is left of the park is a small plaza for activities and an area for jogging and passive entertainment. The area is now known as "Parque del Nino" or "Children's Park".

Shopping is a major tourist activity in Bayamón. Plaza del Sol and Plaza Rio Hondo are large commercial centers in the city.

A suspension bridge in Bayamón is a pedestrian-only bridge, at the time it was built, it was believed to be one of only three of its kind in Puerto Rico.

To stimulate local tourism during the COVID-19 pandemic in Puerto Rico, the Puerto Rico Tourism Company launched the Voy Turistiendo (I'm Touring) campaign in 2021. The campaign featured a passport book with a page for each municipality. The Voy Turisteando Bayamón passport page lists Centro de Conservación de Manatíes, Paseo Lineal over the Bayamón River, and Ron Del Barrilito in the Hacienda Santa Ana, as places of interest.

Ron del Barrilito located in the Hacienda Santa Ana is the oldest rum distillery in Puerto Rico. The hacienda features a nature trail.

== Culture ==
=== Festivals and events ===
Bayamón celebrates its patron saint festival in May. The Festival de la Santa Cruz is a religious and cultural celebration that generally features parades, games, artisans, amusement rides, regional food, and live entertainment.

Other festivals and events celebrated in Bayamón include:

- José Celso Barbosa Birthday Commemoration – July
- Tree Lighting Ceremony – November
- Caminata por la diabetes (Diabetes Walk) – November

=== Sports ===
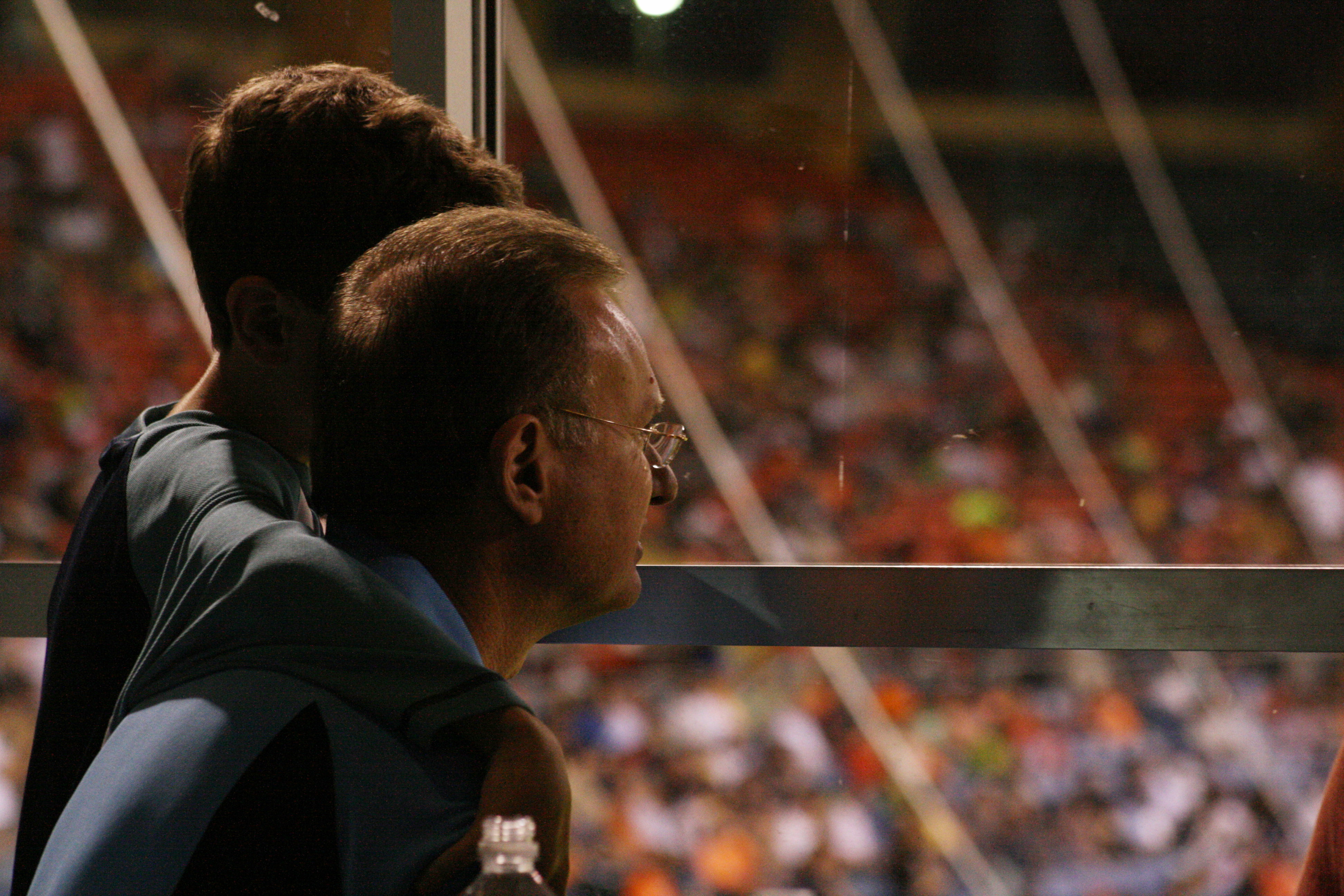
Mayor Ramón Luis Rivera Jr. watching the Puerto Rico Islanders at Estadio Juan Ramón Loubriel

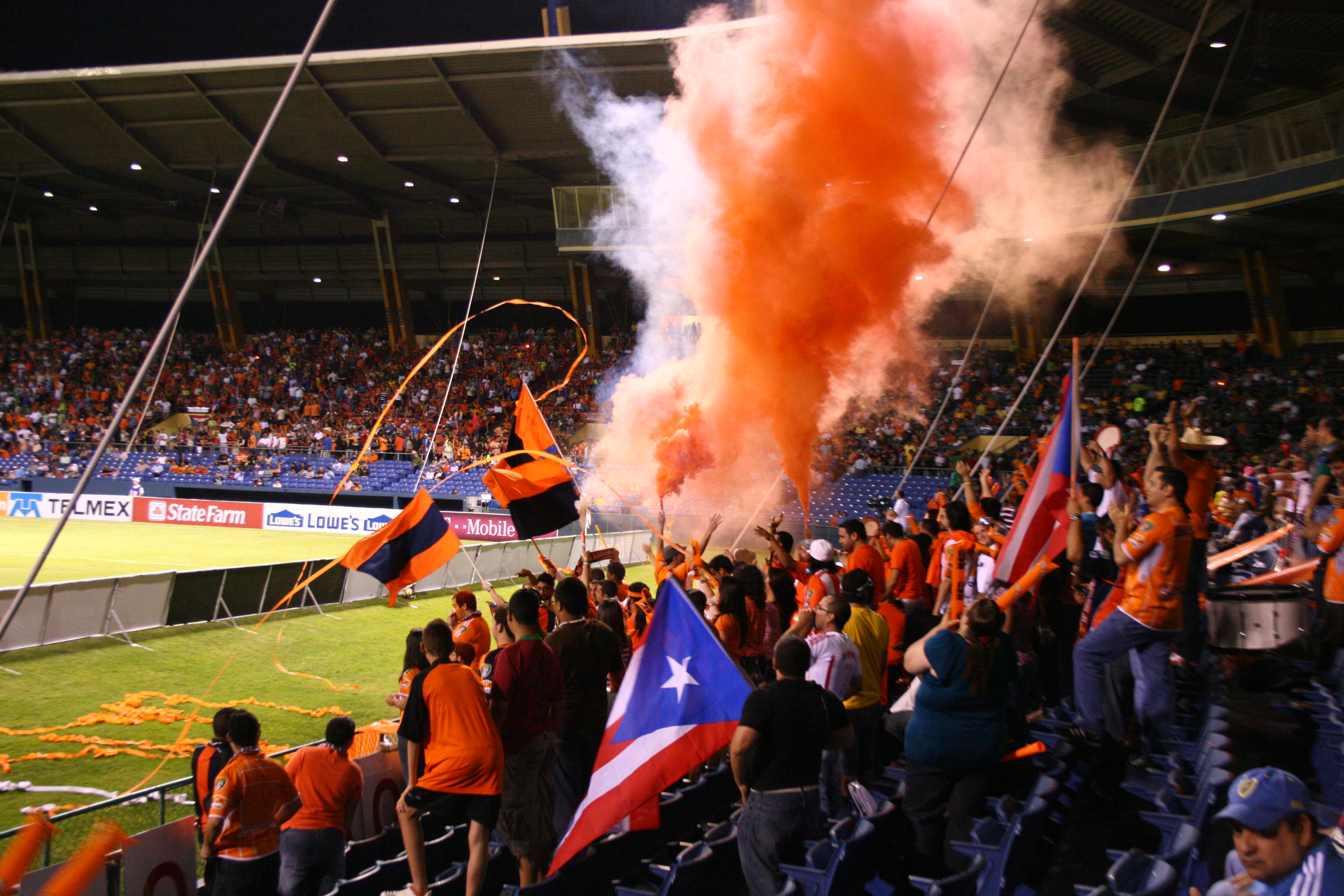
Puerto Rico Islanders fans at Juan Ramón Loubriel Stadium

There are several professional and amateur sports team based in Bayamón. The Vaqueros de Bayamón are the local basketball team that plays at the Baloncesto Superior Nacional league. They are currently the leaders as the team with the most championships in the history of the league (15), the last of which was achieved in 2020. The team's host venue is the Coliseo Rubén Rodríguez.

The Vaqueros de Bayamón was also the name of the baseball club which played from 1974 through 2003 in the Professional Baseball League of Puerto Rico, and played its home games at Juan Ramón Loubriel Stadium.

The city also has a female volleyball team, named the Vaqueras de Bayamón, which plays for the Liga de Voleibol Superior Femenino.

Bayamón was the home of the Puerto Rico Islanders and Puerto Rico FC of the North American Soccer League. The teams played at Juan Ramón Loubriel Stadium in Bayamón. The city's main soccer team, Bayamón FC, was founded in 1999, and play at matches at Bayamón Soccer Complex.

The famous boxing fight between Alexis Argüello and Alfredo Escalera dubbed The Bloody Battle of Bayamon (their first; their equally legendary rematch was held in Rimini, Italy) was held in Bayamón in 1978. Also, professional boxers Luis Del Valle, Wilfredo Vazquez and Wilfredo Vazquez Jr. are from Bayamón. International Boxing Hall of Fame member Hector Camacho was born in Bayamon. Current boxing prospect Jean "Chapito" Rivera is from the Bayamon.

Bayamón sports teams
Club	Sport	League	Venue	League Championships
Bayamón FC	Football	Liga Puerto Rico	Bayamón Soccer Complex	
Vaqueros de Bayamón	Basketball	Baloncesto Superior Nacional	Rubén Rodríguez Coliseum	BSN Championships (15): 1933 – defeated Atléticos de San Germán, series 4–?; 1935 – defeated Vega Baja, series 4–?; 1967 – defeated Leones de Ponce, series 4–?; 1969 – defeated Cardenales de Río Piedras, series 4–?; 1971 – defeated Cardenales de Río Piedras, series 4–?; 1972 – defeated Piratas de Quebradillas, series 4–?; 1973 – defeated Piratas de Quebradillas, series 4–?; 1974 – defeated Capitalinos de San Juan, series 4–?; 1975 – defeated Piratas de Quebradillas, series 4–?; 1981 – defeated Mets de Guaynabo, series 4–2; 1988 – defeated Indios de Canóvanas, series 4–3; 1995 – defeated Leones de Ponce, series 4–1; 1996 – defeated Leones de Ponce, series 4–3; 2009 – defeated Piratas de Quebradillas, series 4–2; 2020 - defeated Piratas de Quebradillas, series 3–0
Vaqueras de Bayamón	Volleyball	Liga de Voleibol Superior Femenino	Rubén Rodríguez Coliseum	

=== Recreation ===
The municipal government of Bayamón manages a wide variety of recreational programs and recreational facilities for public use. The Onofre Carballeira Sports Complex consists of the Juan Ramón Loubriel Soccer Stadium, home of Puerto Rico's only professional soccer team, the Ruben Rodríguez Coliseum, home of the city's male basketball team and female volleyball team, and the Miguel J. Frau Gymnasium. The Rafael Martínez Nadal Sports Complex's main feature is the Pepín Cestero indoor court, where much of the city's minor league basketball and volleyball major events take place. Also, the Efraín Calcaño Alicea Sports Complex located in the Lomas Verdes community is home to much of the track and field and swimming events in the region. The Honda Tennis Center, inaugurated in 2002, is composed of 16 tennis courts and is used by local tennis clubs as well as visitors.

A pioneer in the development of soccer in Puerto Rico, mayor Ramón Luis Rivera Jr. inaugurated the Bayamón Soccer Complex in 2011, which consists of three professional soccer fields located off the PR-5 Highway.

The Paseo del Rio (Paseo Lineal) near the Bayamón River is a 6-mile stretch shared by joggers, walkers and cyclists. It is divided in two lanes, one for the bicycles and the other for running or walking. The Rio Bayamón Golf Course is located near one of the endpoints of the trail and is home to most golf activity in the region.

Julio Enrique Monagas Park has trails used by mountain bikers to train and compete. It also has cliffs where rappelling enthusiasts can practice. Monagas, as the locals refer to it, has trails for mountain bike riders of all skill levels. Unpaved roads for beginners, single tracks and very technical single tracks, some of them with downhills. After Hurricane Maria, the tracks were lost, yet by 2019, most of them had been repaired and reopened.

The city also has many smaller baseball parks, open basketball courts, soccer fields, gymnasiums, and communal centers available to the community.

== Economy ==
=== Agriculture ===
The founding of the town of Bayamón is closely tied to the cultivation of sugarcane. The products currently grown in Bayamón include coffee, grapefruit, sugarcane, tobacco and vegetables. Bayamón was also the site where the first hydraulic sugar mill on the island was built in 1549.

=== Business ===
Notable malls are:

- Plaza del Sol
- Plaza Rio Hondo

Goya Foods has its Puerto Rico offices in Bayamón.

== Demographics ==
Puerto Rico was ceded by Spain in the aftermath of the Spanish–American War under the terms of the Treaty of Paris of 1898 and became a territory of the United States. In 1899, the United States conducted its first census of Puerto Rico finding that the population of Bayamón was 19,940.

Historical population
Census	Pop.	Note	%±
1900	19,940		—
1910	29,986		50.4%
1920	30,739		2.5%
1930	29,524		−4.0%
1940	37,190		26.0%
1950	48,000		29.1%
1960	72,221		50.5%
1970	156,192		116.3%
1980	196,206		25.6%
1990	220,262		12.3%
2000	224,044		1.7%
2010	208,116		−7.1%
2020	185,187		−11.0%
2025 (est.)	180,562	▼	−2.5%
U.S. Decennial Census; 1899 (shown as 1900) 1910–1930; 1930–1950 1960–2000 2010 2020

Race – Bayamón, Puerto Rico – 2020 Census
Race	Population	% of Total
White	33,084	17.9%
Black/Afro-Puerto Rican	30,159	16.3%
American Indian/Alaska Native	5,470	3.0%
Asian	555	0.3%
Two or more races/Some other race	115,919	62.5%

== Government ==
All municipalities in Puerto Rico are administered by a mayor, elected every four years. The current mayor of Bayamón is Ramón Luis Rivera Jr., of the New Progressive Party (PNP). He was elected at the 2000 general elections, succeeding his father, Ramón Luis Rivera, after 23 years. For a list of all the mayors of Bayamón see "External Links".

The city belongs to the Puerto Rico Senatorial district II, which is represented by two Senators. Migdalia Padilla and Carmelo Ríos Santiago have served as District Senators since 2005.

== Symbols ==
The municipio has an official flag and coat of arms.

=== Flag ===
The current flag of Bayamón features the Nordic cross found in many Northern European flags and is colored in blue and yellow over a white field, similar to the flag of Finland, with the Finnish flag having a thicker cross, and the flag of Bayamón having yellow stripes between the blue cross and the white background. It was embroidered by Gloria M. León and maintains the design and colors of its coat of arms.

=== Coat of arms ===
This shield is a symbol and synthesis of the history and the values which distinguish the city of Bayamón. The main colors of the shield are blue and silver, representing the waters of the Bayamón River and recalling that it was on these banks that the first hydraulic sugarcane refinery of Puerto Rico was established in 1549. The center contains the Holy Cross (Santa Cruz), patron of the first church of the municipality and the name of the old sugarcane refinery "Santa Cruz", which was the historical origin of the town of Bayamón. The sugarcane flowers (guajana) allude directly to the sugarcane industry that is of social and economic importance to the origin and development of Bayamón.

The five-tower crown, which is used for cities, was assigned to Bayamón as an exception for its extraordinary urban development, the magnitude of its population and for its religious dignity, which will possibly be raised to become Episcopal seat. The motto "IN HOC SIGNO VINCES" makes reference to Emperor Constantine when in the 4th century had the vision in which the victory was promised to him if it accepted the cross of Christianity as his banner.

== Education ==
Like all municipalities, public education is administered by Puerto Rico Department of Education. Due to its population and location within the San Juan metropolitan region, Bayamón is home to many public and private schools. During the 2014–2015 academic year, over 150 public schools ranging from elementary school to high school were located in the Bayamón school region. On the other hand, the city is also home to numerous private schools of which most have a religious affiliation. Some of the better known religious private schools include Colegio De La Salle, Academia Santo Tomás de Aquino, Academia Santa Rosa, Colegio Beato Carlos Manuel Rodríguez, and Academia Discípulos de Cristo (non-Catholic). Non-religious schools in the city include Bayamón Military Academy and the American School.

Bayamón also has many higher-learning institutions such as the University of Puerto Rico at Bayamón, which is one of the eleven campuses that comprise the University of Puerto Rico public university system. Furthermore, the city is also home to some of the most recognized private universities in the island, such as the Interamerican University of Puerto Rico and its School of Optometry, Bayamón Central University, American University of Puerto Rico, Universidad Central del Caribe, and some community colleges. In addition, the Metropolitan University (Universidad Metropolitana), better known as UMET, has a campus in downtown Bayamón.

== Transportation ==
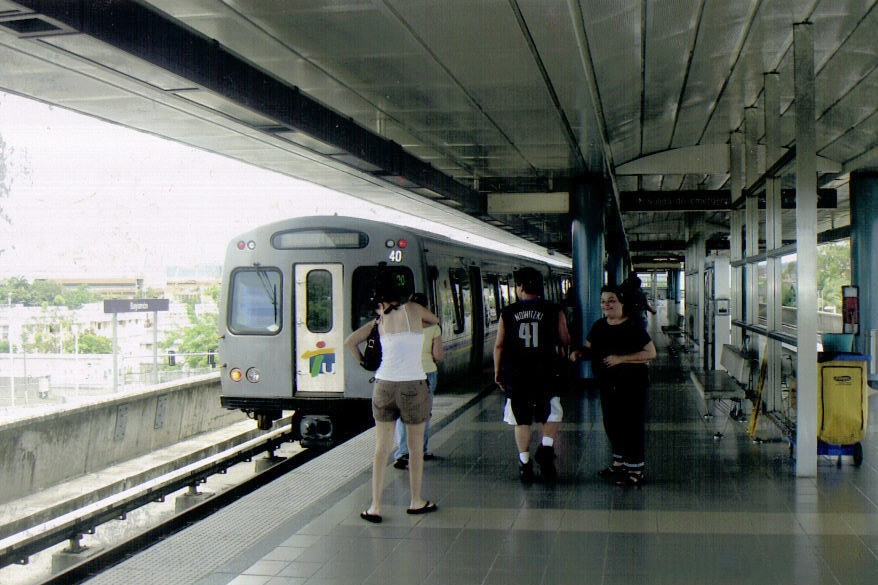
Tren Urbano at Bayamón Station

The lone line of the Tren Urbano of the San Juan metropolitan area ends at Bayamón station, and three of its stops are located within the city. The Deportivo station, located off the PR-2 Highway, is near the Santa Rosa Mall, the Bayamón Court of First Instance, and the Onofre Carballeira Sports Complex which contains the Juan Ramón Loubriel Stadium and the Ruben Rodríguez Coliseum.

The city also has a trolley service with regular routes within Downtown Bayamón.

There are 77 bridges in Bayamón.

== Notable natives and residents ==
- Raymond Acevedo, singer, actor, former member of Menudo
- Javier Báez, professional baseball player for the Detroit Tigers
- José Berríos, professional baseball player for the Toronto Blue Jays
- Héctor Camacho, former professional boxer
- Braulio Castillo, actor
- Virgilio Dávila, poet and former mayor of Bayamón (1905–1910)
- Zabdiel de Jesus, vocalist, founding member of CNCO
- Rubén Díaz Sr., New York State Senator
- Nina Flowers, drag queen and disc jockey
- Yadier Molina, professional baseball player
- Felipe López, professional baseball player
- Ramón Luis Rivera, former mayor
- Ramón Luis Rivera Jr., present mayor
- Agustín Stahl, medical doctor and botanist
- Wilfredo Vazquez, professional boxer
- Christian Vazquez professional baseball player, Minnesota Twins
- Melissa Mark-Viverito, speaker of the New York City Council
- Omar Rodríguez-López, composer, guitarist, and filmmaker
- Braulio Dueño Colón, musician and composer
- José Antonio Dávila, Postmodern poet
- Pilar Barbosa, historian, educator and political activist
- Rene Farrait, singer and actor, former member of boy band Menudo
- Xavier Serbiá, singer, actor, show host and economical analyst, former member of boy band Menudo
- Farruko, singer, songwriter
- Gabriel Mora, singer, songwriter, and producer

== See also ==
- List of Puerto Ricans
- History of Puerto Rico
- Puerto Rico Islanders former NASL soccer
  - Puerto Rico FC current NASL soccer
- Vaqueros de Bayamón BSN basketball
