= Puerto Rico Highway 5 =

Highway in Puerto Rico

Highway 5
- Ruta 5

Route information
- Maintained by Metropistas
- Length: 25.7 km (16.0 mi)
- Existed: 2006–present

Southern segment
- South end: PR-152 / PR-164 in Achiote–Naranjito barrio-pueblo
- Major intersections: PR-148 / PR-826 in Guadiana
- North end: PR-828 in Ortíz–Buena Vista

Northern segment
- South end: PR-199 in Cerro Gordo–Minillas
- Major intersections: PR-174 in Minillas–Bayamón barrio-pueblo; PR-2 in Bayamón barrio-pueblo; PR-29 in Juan Sánchez; PR-6 in Juan Sánchez; PR-28 in Juan Sánchez; PR-22 / PR-869 in Juan Sánchez–Palmas; PR-165 in Palmas
- North end: Calle Canal in Cataño barrio-pueblo

Location
- Country: United States
- Territory: Puerto Rico
- Municipalities: Naranjito, Toa Alta, Bayamón, Cataño

Highway system
- Roads in Puerto Rico; List
| ← PR-3 | → PR-6 |

Puerto Rico Highway 5 (PR-5) is a main highway in the San Juan Metropolitan area which connects the cities of Cataño to Bayamón and is being extended and converted to a tollway (it has a toll plaza in Bayamón near PR-2 and PR-174) to access the municipalities of Naranjito and Comerío. It is a short freeway from south Cataño to the business area in Bayamón. It makes intersections with PR-22, PR-6, PR-2 and PR-199, where it ends at this time. The highway will parallel PR-167 and will contain the new cable-stayed bridge being built between Bayamón and Naranjito. It will probably end in Puerto Rico highway 152 when completed.

== Route description ==
=== Cataño to Bayamón ===
PR-5 begins in a dead end in downtown Cataño, on a peninsula overlooking San Juan Bay. It crosses downtown Cataño on an urban street, passing through the main square. Shortly after an intersection with PR-165, it becomes a divided avenue until reaching PR-22 at the Bayamon city limit.

After the PR-22 intersection, it becomes a freeway, paralleling the Metro Urbano bus rapid transit route. After an intersection with PR-29, it becomes an avenue in downtown Bayamon, where the Metro Urbano ends. After the intersection with PR-2, it becomes a tolled freeway until this section ends, becoming the western section of PR-199.

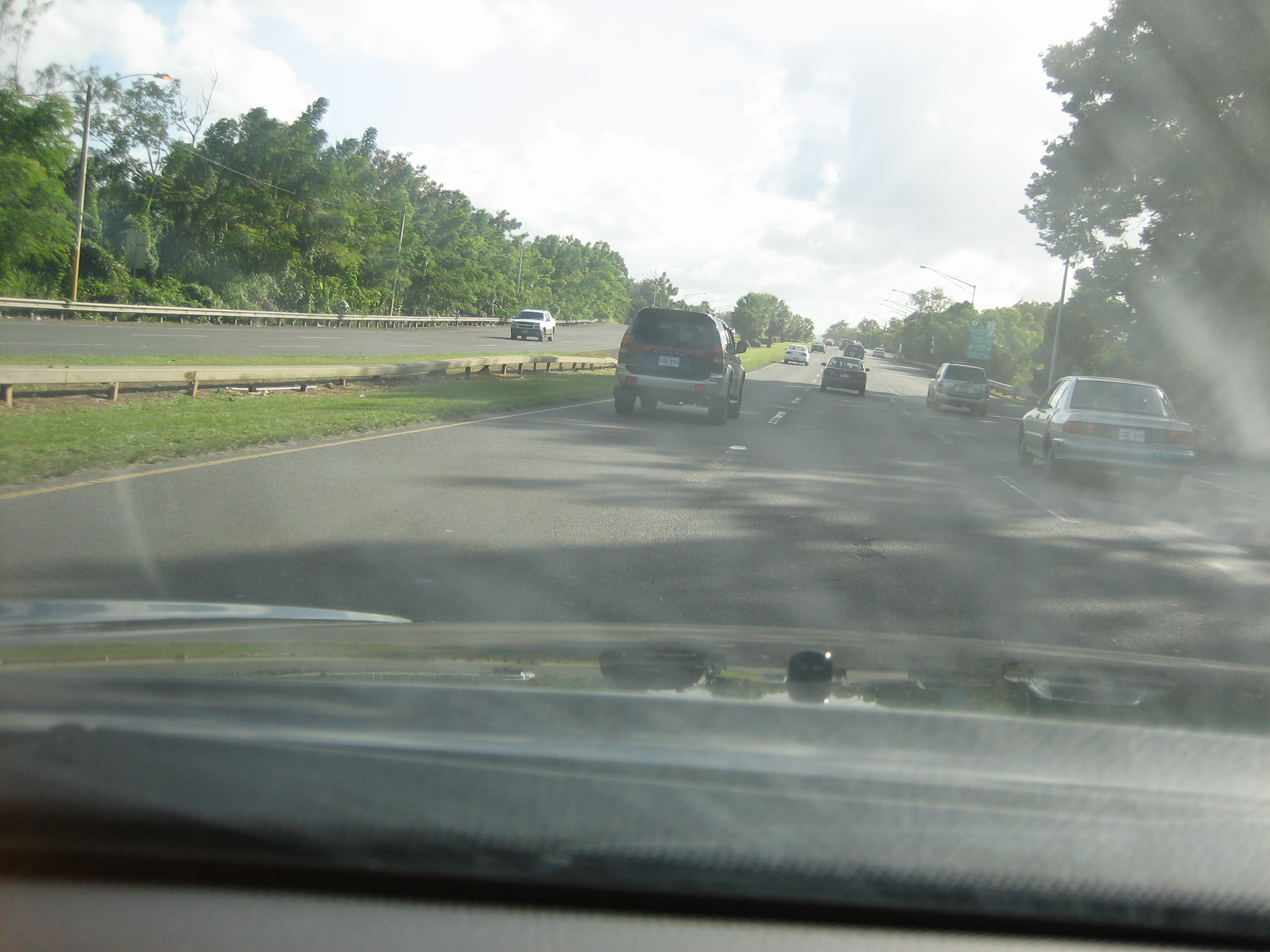
PR-5 south in Bayamón

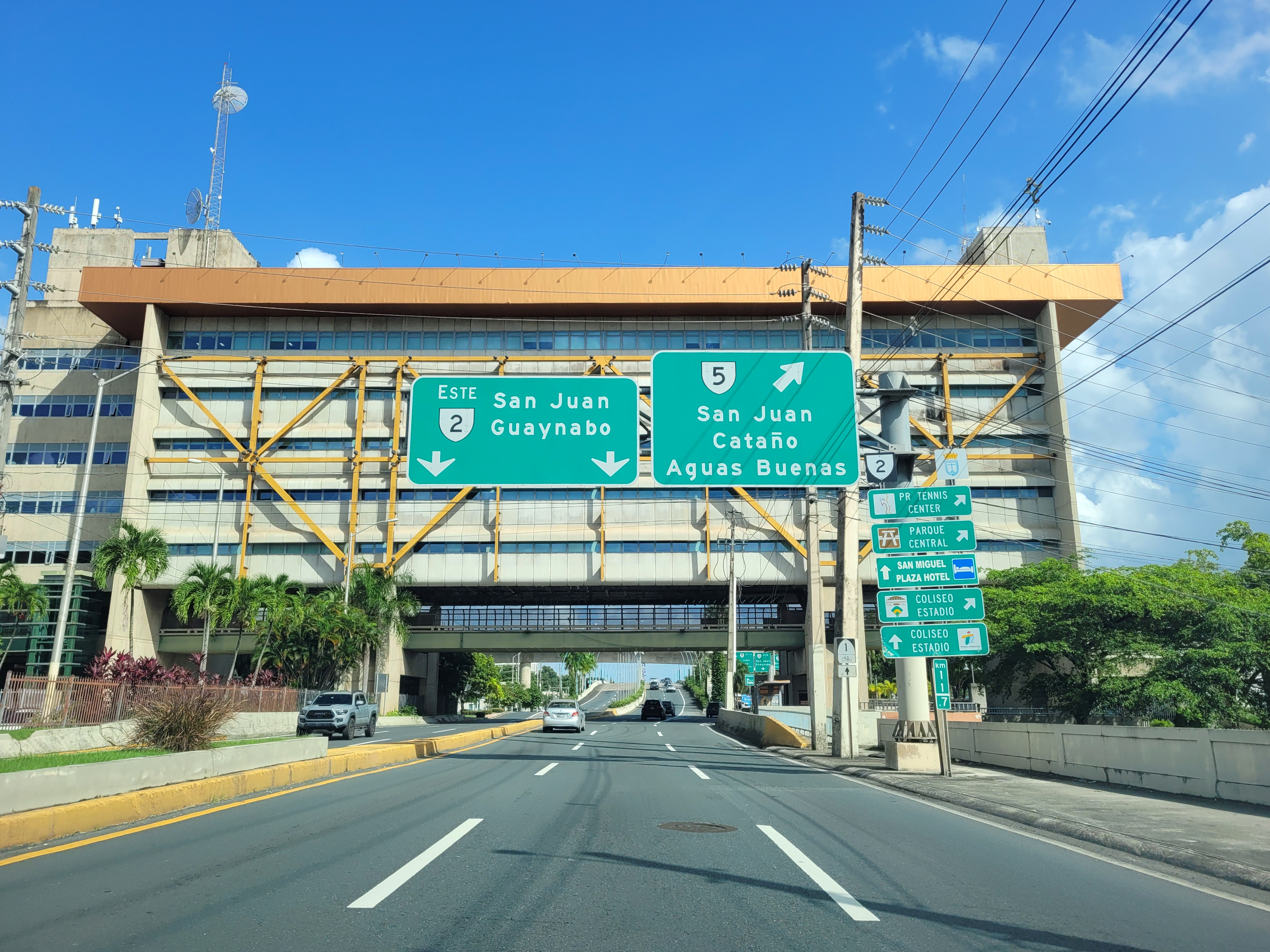
PR-2 east approaching PR-5 interchange in Bayamón

=== Toa Alta to Naranjito ===
This section begins at an intersection with PR-167, near the border with Bayamon. This segment passes through the Jesús Izcoa Moure Bridge and is a freeway until the junction with PR-148. It then continues as a non divide highway, and then becomes divided until its end at an intersection with PR-164 and PR-152. This entire segment was originally known as PR-147.

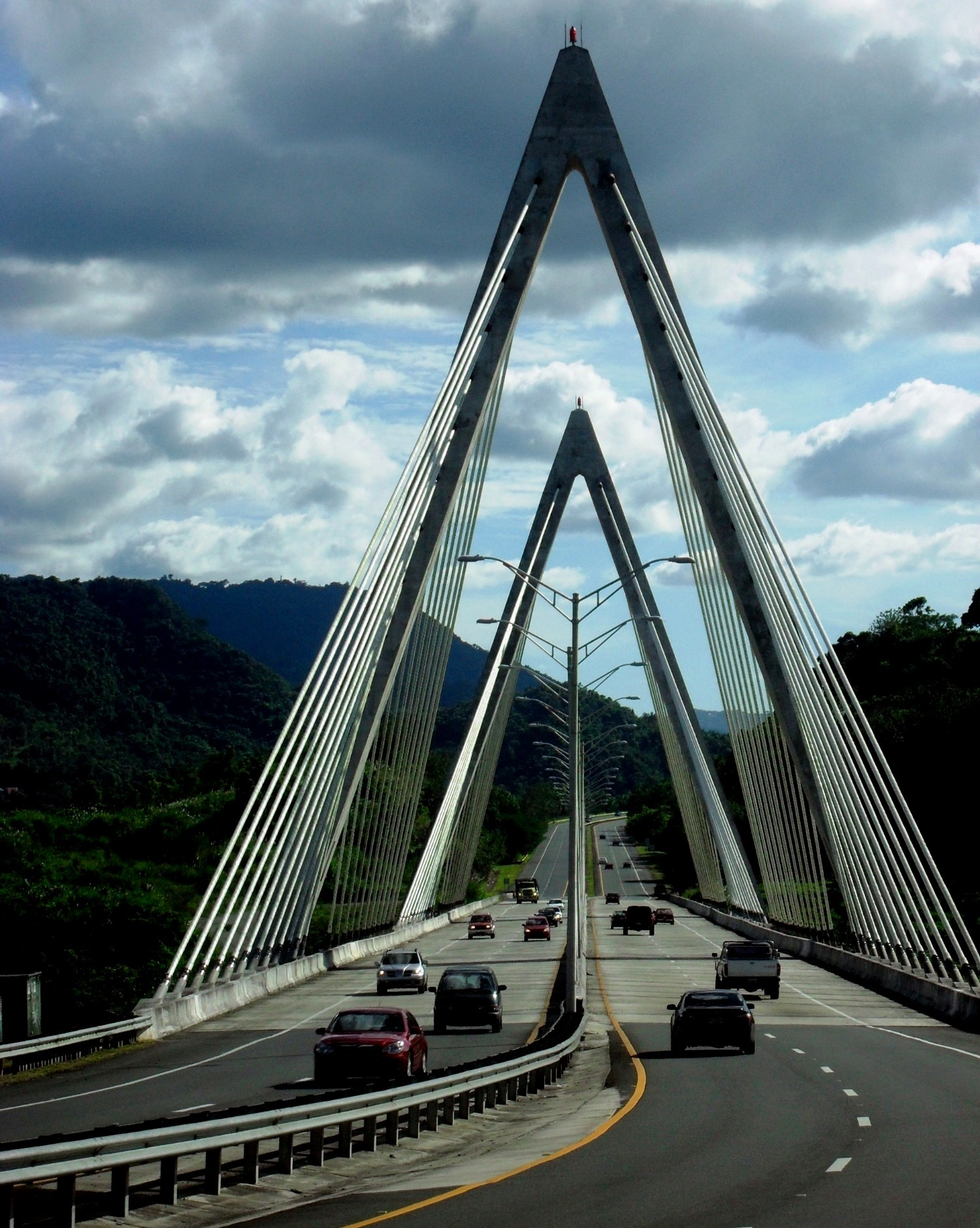
Jesús Izcoa Moure Bridge near Naranjito

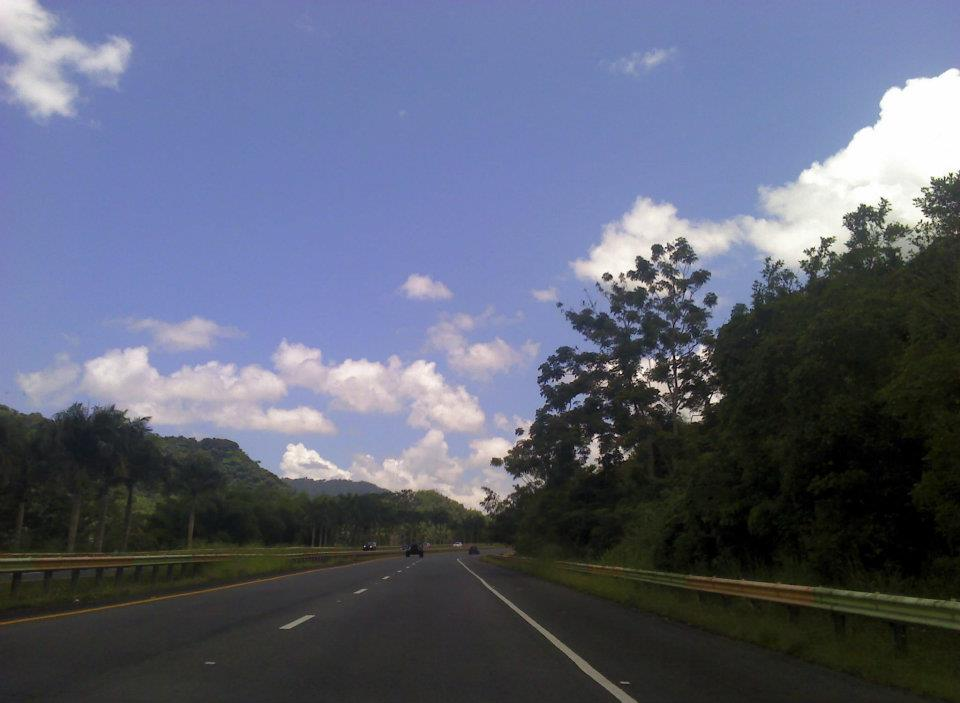
PR-5 south in Naranjito

== Tolls ==
| Location | Toll | Direction | AutoExpreso acceptance | AutoExpreso replenishment (R) lane |
|---|---|---|---|---|
| Bayamón | $0.55 | Two-way | | (northbound only) |

== Major intersections ==
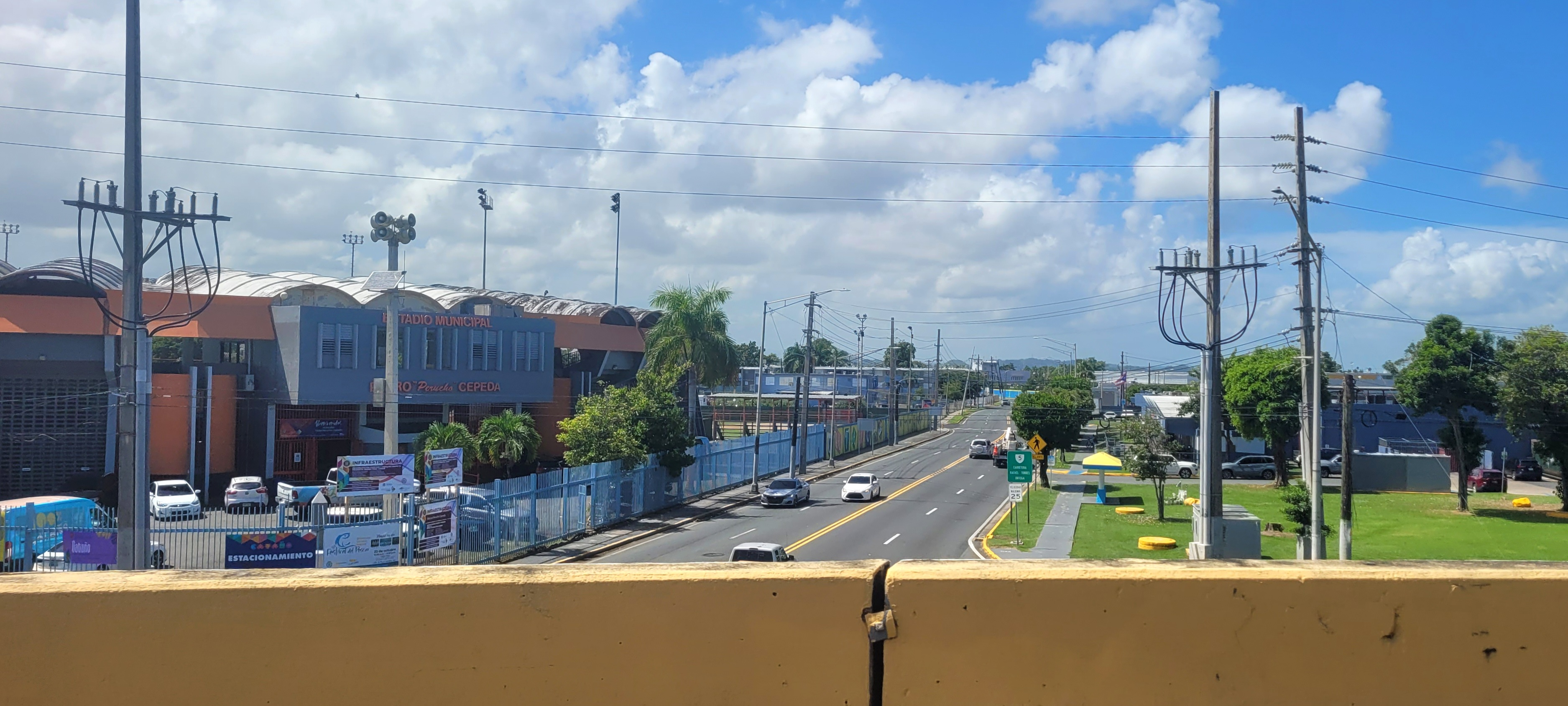
PR-5 south at PR-165 interchange in Cataño

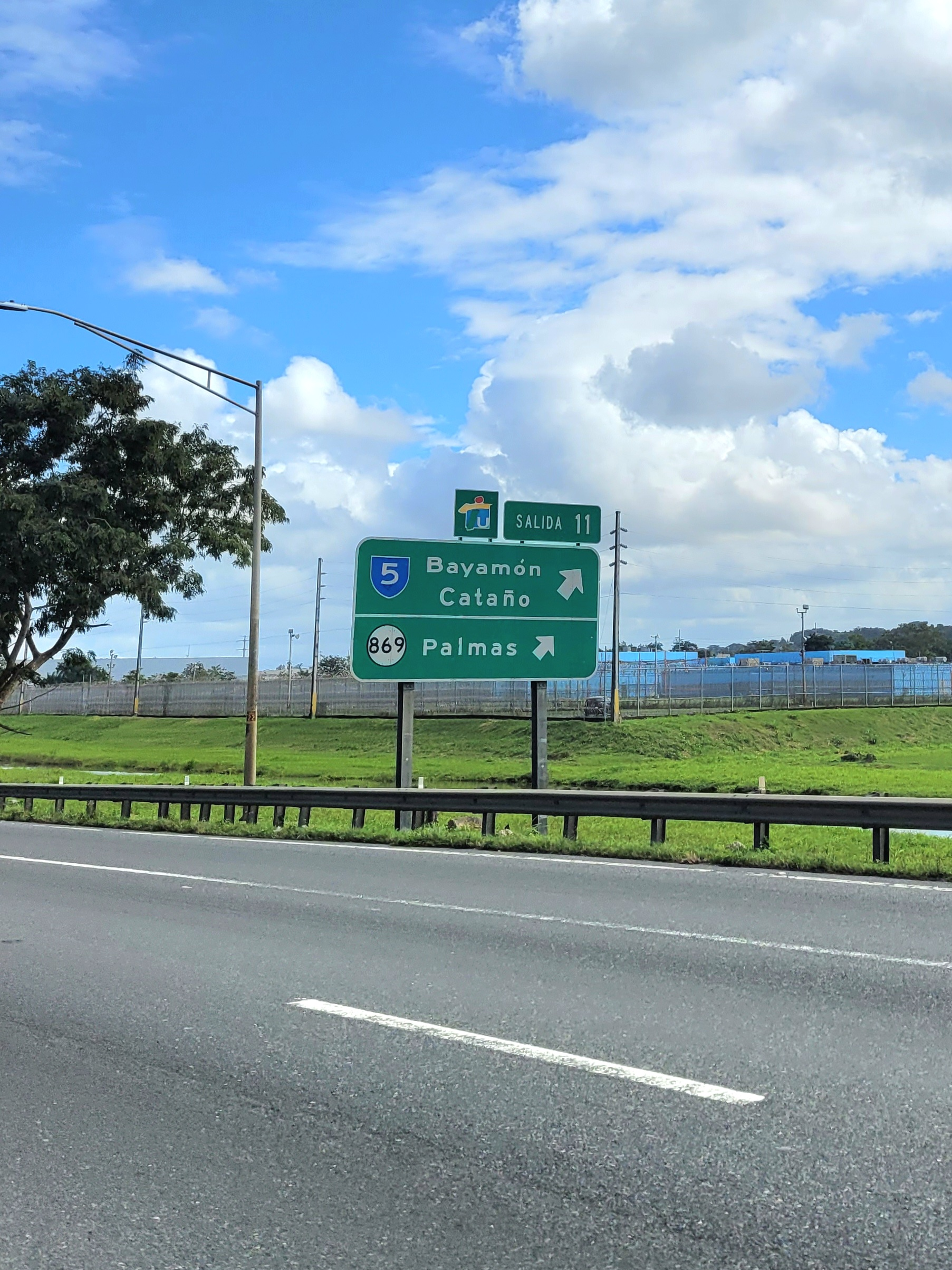
PR-22 east at exit 11 to PR-5 and PR-869 between Bayamón and Cataño

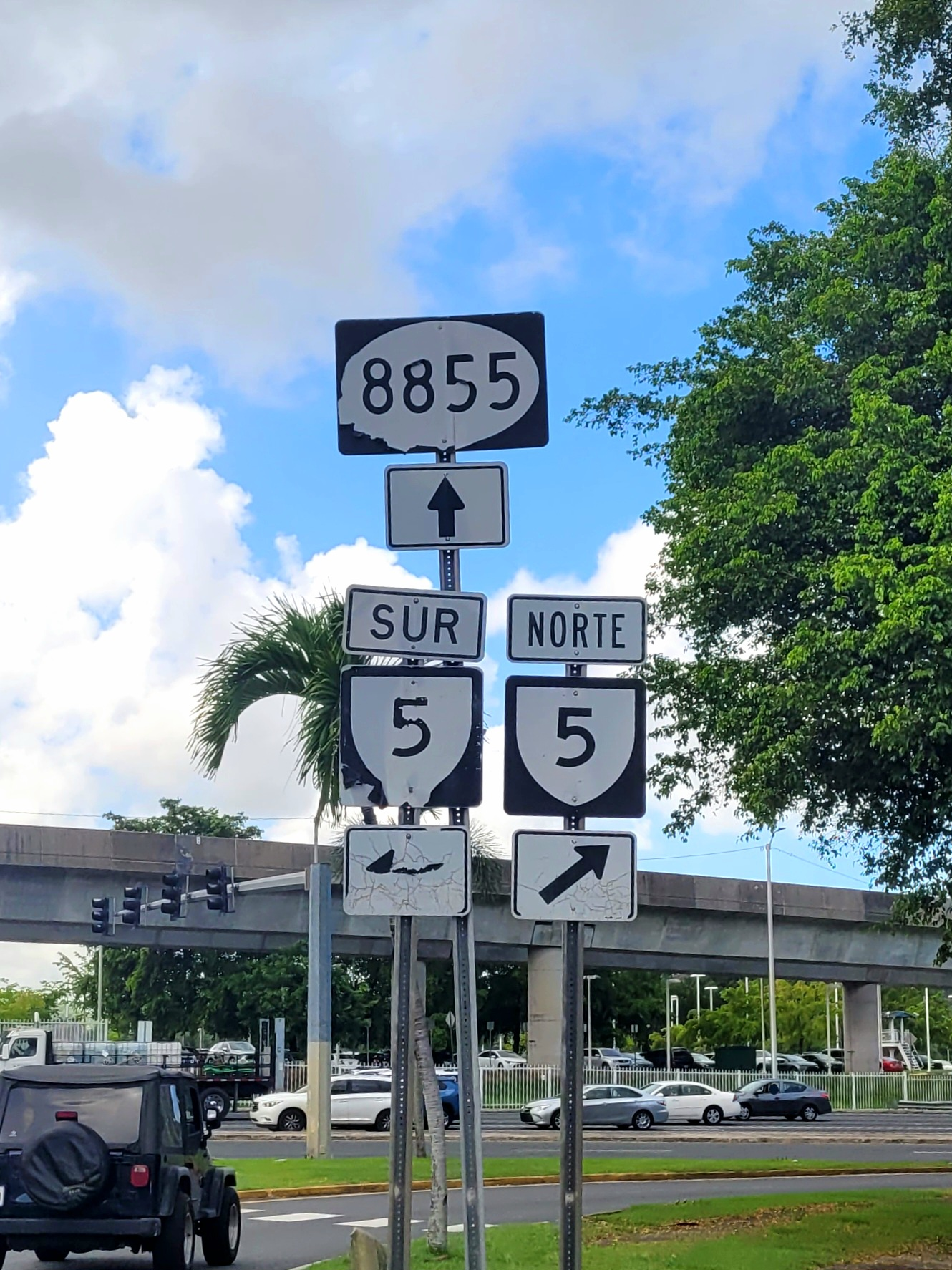
PR-8855 west at PR-5 junction in Bayamón

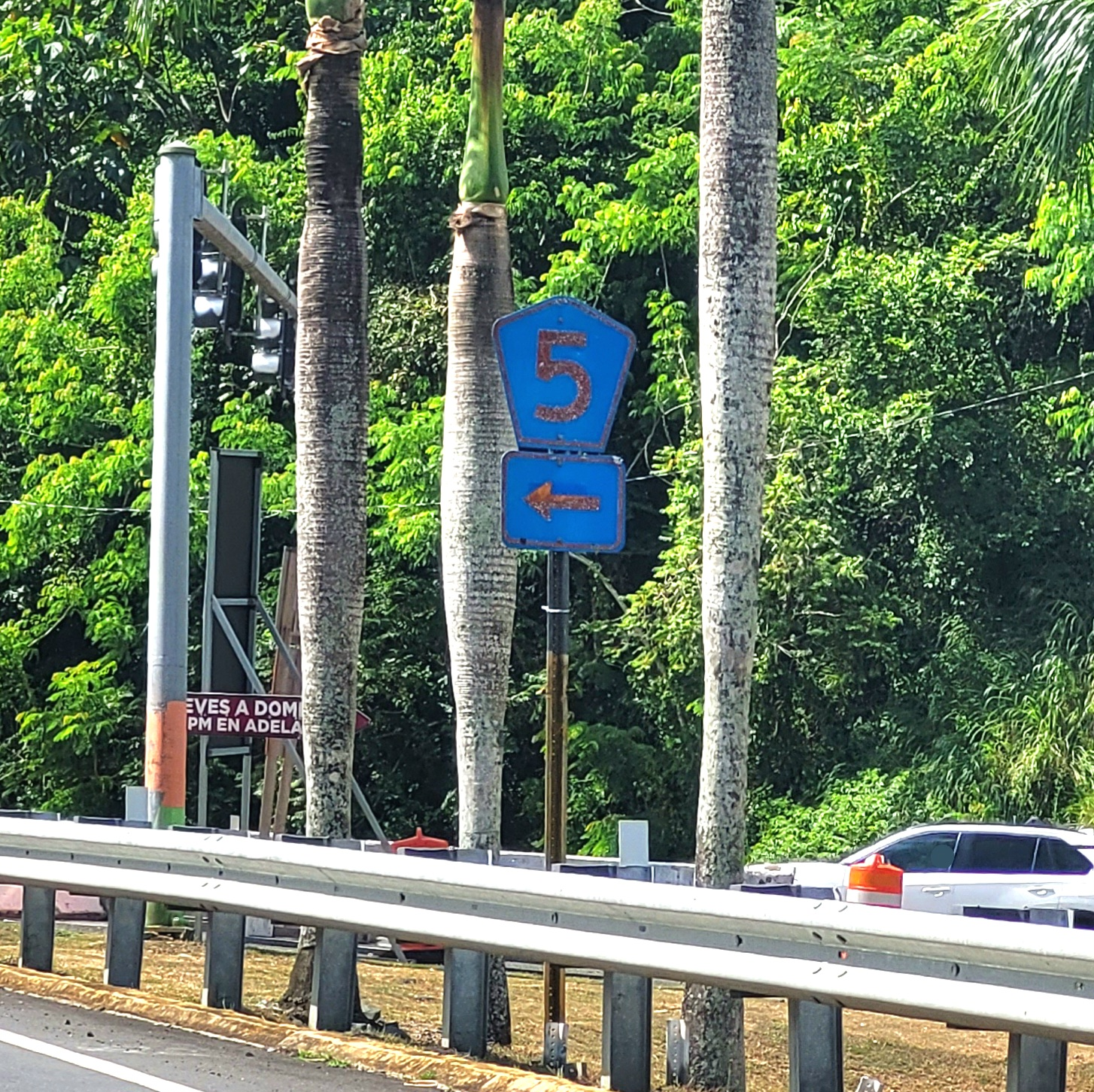
PR-148 north at PR-5 and PR-826 intersection in Guadiana, Naranjito

| Municipality | Location | km | mi | Exit | Destinations | Notes |
|---|---|---|---|---|---|---|
| Naranjito | Achiote–Naranjito barrio-pueblo line | 25.7 | 16.0 | | PR-152 south – Barranquitas | Continuation beyond PR-164 |
| Naranjito | Achiote–Naranjito barrio-pueblo line | 25.7 | 16.0 | | PR-164 west – Corozal | Southern terminus of PR-5 and northern terminus of PR-152; southern terminus of PR-164 concurrency |
| Naranjito | Achiote–Naranjito barrio-pueblo line | 25.5 | 15.8 | | PR-164 (Calle Georgetti Fas) – Naranjito | Northern terminus of PR-164 concurrency |
| Naranjito | Naranjito barrio-pueblo | 25.3– 25.2 | 15.7– 15.7 | | To PR-164 (Calle Grorgetti Fas) / PR-Calle Marcelino Cruz Cosme – Naranjito | |
| Naranjito | Achiote | 24.7 | 15.3 | | PR-825 – Naranjito, Achiote | |
| Naranjito | Guadiana | 23.8– 23.7 | 14.8– 14.7 | | PR-147 to PR-164 – Naranjito | Former highway |
| Naranjito | Guadiana | 21.0 | 13.0 | | PR-148 south / PR-826 – Bayamón, Comerío, Guadiana | |
| Naranjito | Guadiana | 19.0 | 11.8 | — | PR-Camino Hatito – Guadiana | Northbound exit and entrance |
| Lago La Plata | | 19.0– 18.5 | 11.8– 11.5 | Puente Jesús Izcoa Moure | | |
| Toa Alta | Ortíz | 18.3 | 11.4 | — | To PR-167 – Bayamón, Comerío | Incomplete diamond interchange; southbound exit and northbound entrance |
| Toa Alta–Bayamón municipal line | Ortíz–Buena Vista line | 17.0 | 10.6 | — | PR-828 (Avenida Los Palacios) to PR-167 (Avenida Ramón Luis Rivera) – Bayamón, Comerío, Ortíz | Northern terminus of southern segment; all northbound traffic must exit; partial cloverleaf interchange; mainline stub exist for a future extension |
Temporary gap in PR-5
| Bayamón | Cerro Gordo | 14.4 | 8.9 | | PR-830 to PR-167 / PR-840 | Proposed |
Temporary gap in PR-5
| Bayamón | Cerro Gordo–Minillas line | 11.3 | 7.0 | | PR-199 to PR-831 – Bayamón, Comerío, Minillas, Cerro Gordo | Southern terminus of northern segment; seagull intersection |
| Bayamón | Minillas | 10.9 | 6.8 | — | PR-Avenida Magnolia / PR-Avenida Santa Juanita – Bayamón | Diamond interchange |
| Bayamón | Minillas–Cerro Gordo line | 9.5 | 5.9 | 7 | PR-Avenida Los Millones – Bayamón | Diamond interchange |
| Bayamón | Minillas | 8.5– 8.4 | 5.3– 5.2 | Bayamón Toll Plaza | | |
| Bayamón | Minillas–Bayamón barrio-pueblo line | 7.9– 7.8 | 4.9– 4.8 | — | PR-174 south (Avenida Doctor Agustín Stahl) / PR-Avenida Doctor Ramón Luis Rodríguez – Bayamón, Guaynabo, Aguas Buenas | Partial cloverleaf interchange |
| Bayamón | Bayamón barrio-pueblo | 7.5 | 4.7 | | PR-2 – Guaynabo, San Juan, Arecibo | Single-point urban interchange |
| Bayamón | Bayamón barrio-pueblo | 7.1 | 4.4 | | PR-855 – Bayamón | All turns via Calle Ramón Emeterio Betances |
| Bayamón | Juan Sánchez | 6.9 | 4.3 | | PR-8855 (Avenida Bobby Capó) – Bayamón | |
| Bayamón | Juan Sánchez | 6.7 | 4.2 | — | PR-29 (Avenida Main Oeste) – Bayamón, Arecibo, Hato Tejas | Trumpet interchange |
| Bayamón | Juan Sánchez | 6.0 | 3.7 | — | PR-6 south (Calle San José) – Guaynabo | Trumpet interchange |
| Bayamón | Juan Sánchez | 5.3 | 3.3 | — | PR-28 (Avenida Francisco José de Goya) – Guaynabo, San Juan | Diamond interchange |
| Bayamón–Cataño municipal line | Juan Sánchez–Palmas line | 4.2– 4.0 | 2.6– 2.5 | — | PR-22 (Autopista José de Diego) / PR-869 (Carretera Industrial) – San Juan, Arecibo, Palmas | Northern terminus of Expreso Río Hondo; southern terminus of Carretera Rafael Torres Ortega; PR-22 exits 9 and 10 |
| Cataño | Palmas | 3.3– 3.2 | 2.1– 2.0 | | PR-8869 (Calle Leopoldo Figueroa) – Cucharillas, Puente Blanco | |
| Cataño | Palmas | 1.6 | 0.99 | | PR-165 (Avenida El Caño) – San Juan, Toa Baja | Northern terminus of Carretera Rafael Torres Ortega; diamond interchange; southern terminus of Avenida José Celso Barbosa |
| Cataño | Cataño barrio-pueblo | 0.8 | 0.50 | | PR-24 (Calle Wilson) – Guaynabo | One-way street |
| Cataño | Cataño barrio-pueblo | 0.4 | 0.25 | | PR-888 (Avenida Las Nereidas) – Cataño | |
| Cataño | Cataño barrio-pueblo | 0.0 | 0.0 | | PR-Calle Canal – Cataño | Northern terminus of PR-5 |
1.000 mi = 1.609 km; 1.000 km = 0.621 mi: Concurrency terminus; Incomplete access; Tolled; Route transition; Unopened
