= Puerto Rico Highway 29 =

Highway in Puerto Rico

Highway 29
- Ruta 29
- Avenida Main Oeste

Route information
- Maintained by Puerto Rico DTPW
- Length: 3.5 km (2.2 mi)

Major junctions
- West end: PR-2 in Hato Tejas
- PR-871 in Hato Tejas; PR-872 in Hato Tejas; PR-168 in Hato Tejas; PR-167 in Hato Tejas; PR-890 in Juan Sánchez
- East end: PR-5 in Juan Sánchez

Location
- Country: United States
- Territory: Puerto Rico
- Municipalities: Bayamón

Highway system
- Roads in Puerto Rico; List
← PR-28	→ PR-30

Puerto Rico Highway 29 (PR-29) is an avenue in the city of Bayamón, Puerto Rico. It connects from the PR-2 (in Hato Tejas) to the PR-5, intersects the PR-167 at Plaza del Sol (a major commercial centers of Bayamón). This road is called Avenida Main Oeste.

Puerto Rico Highway 29

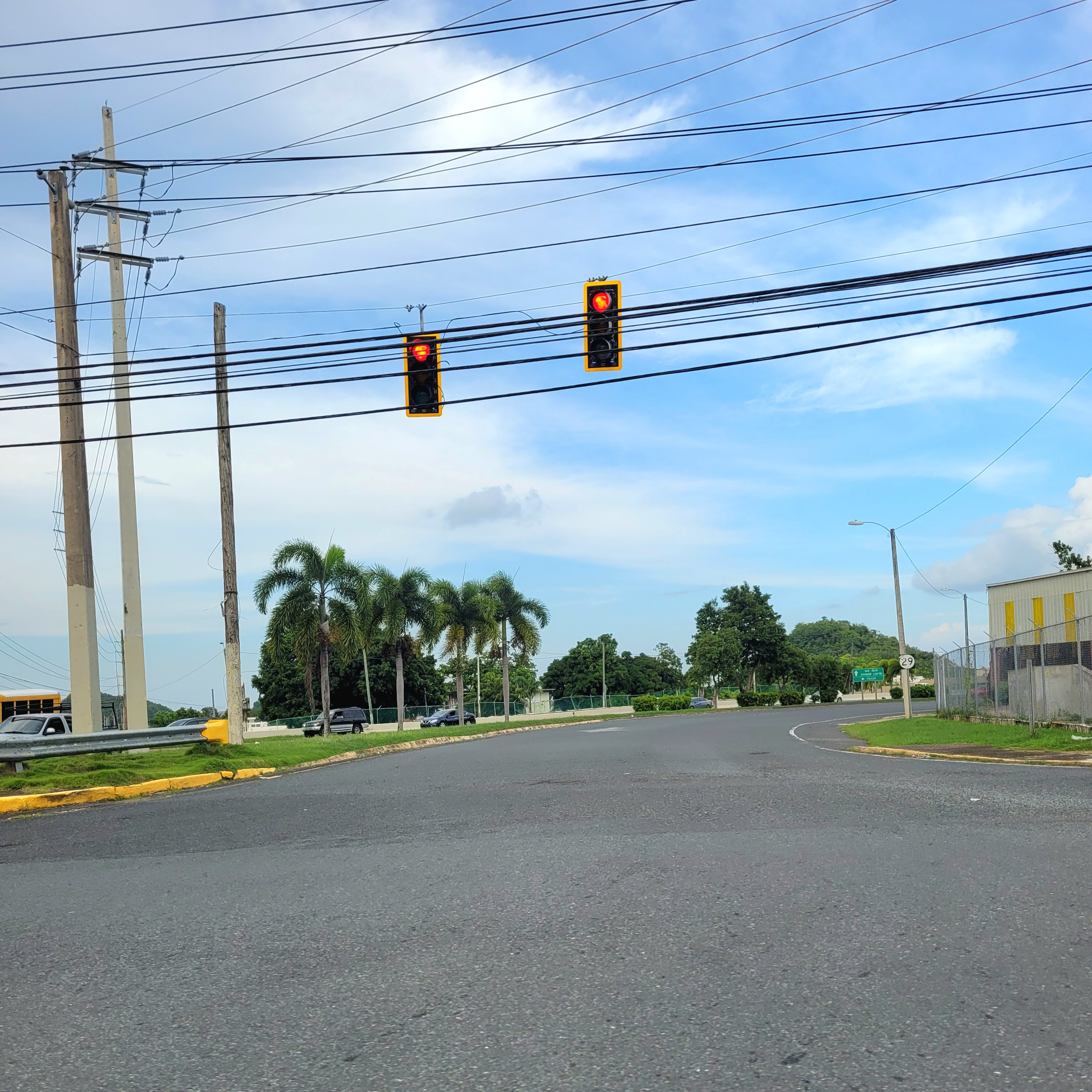
Western terminus at PR-2 junction in Hato Tejas barrio, looking north

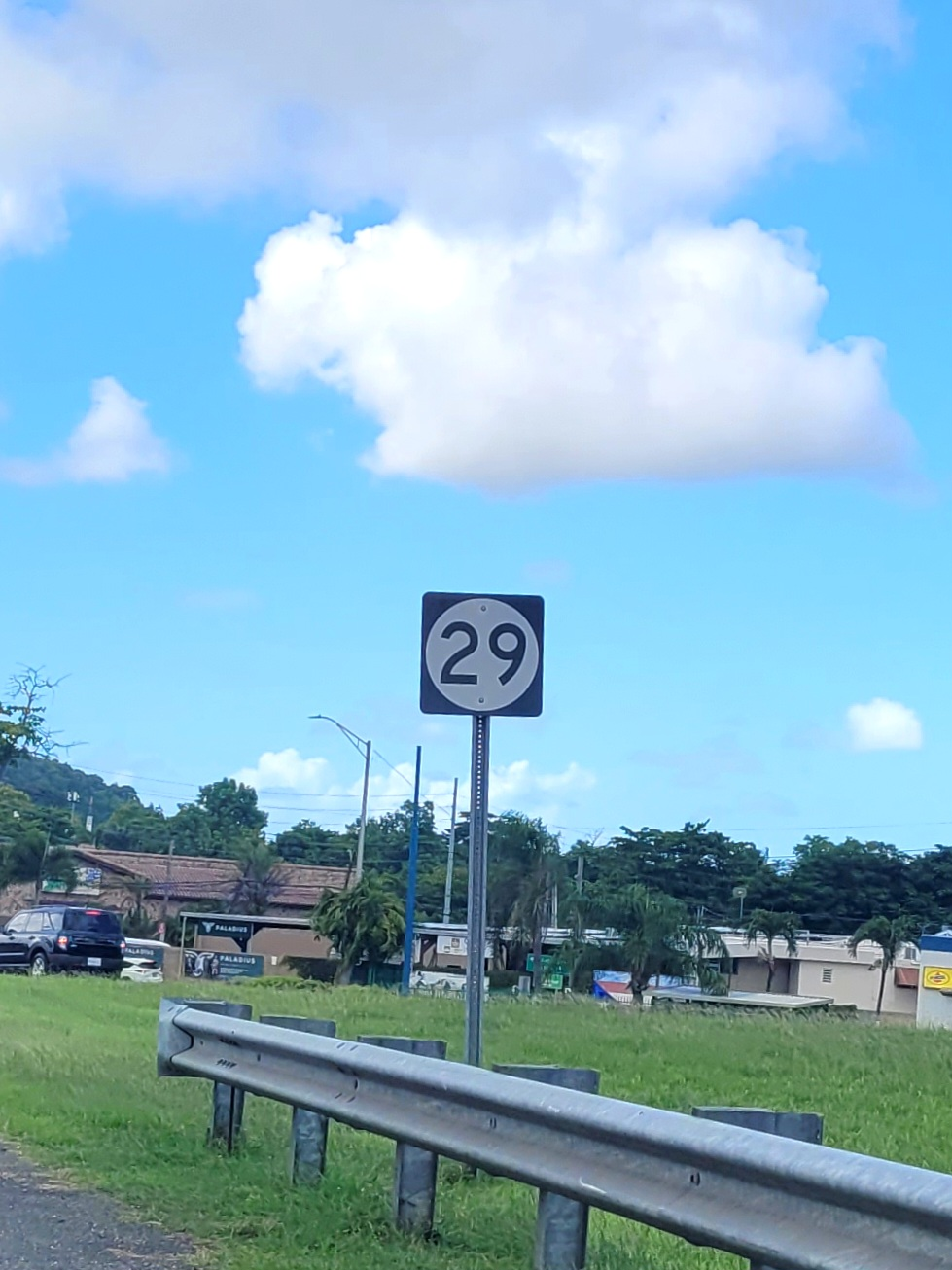
Westbound sign in Juan Sánchez barrio

== Major intersections ==
The entire route is located in Bayamón.

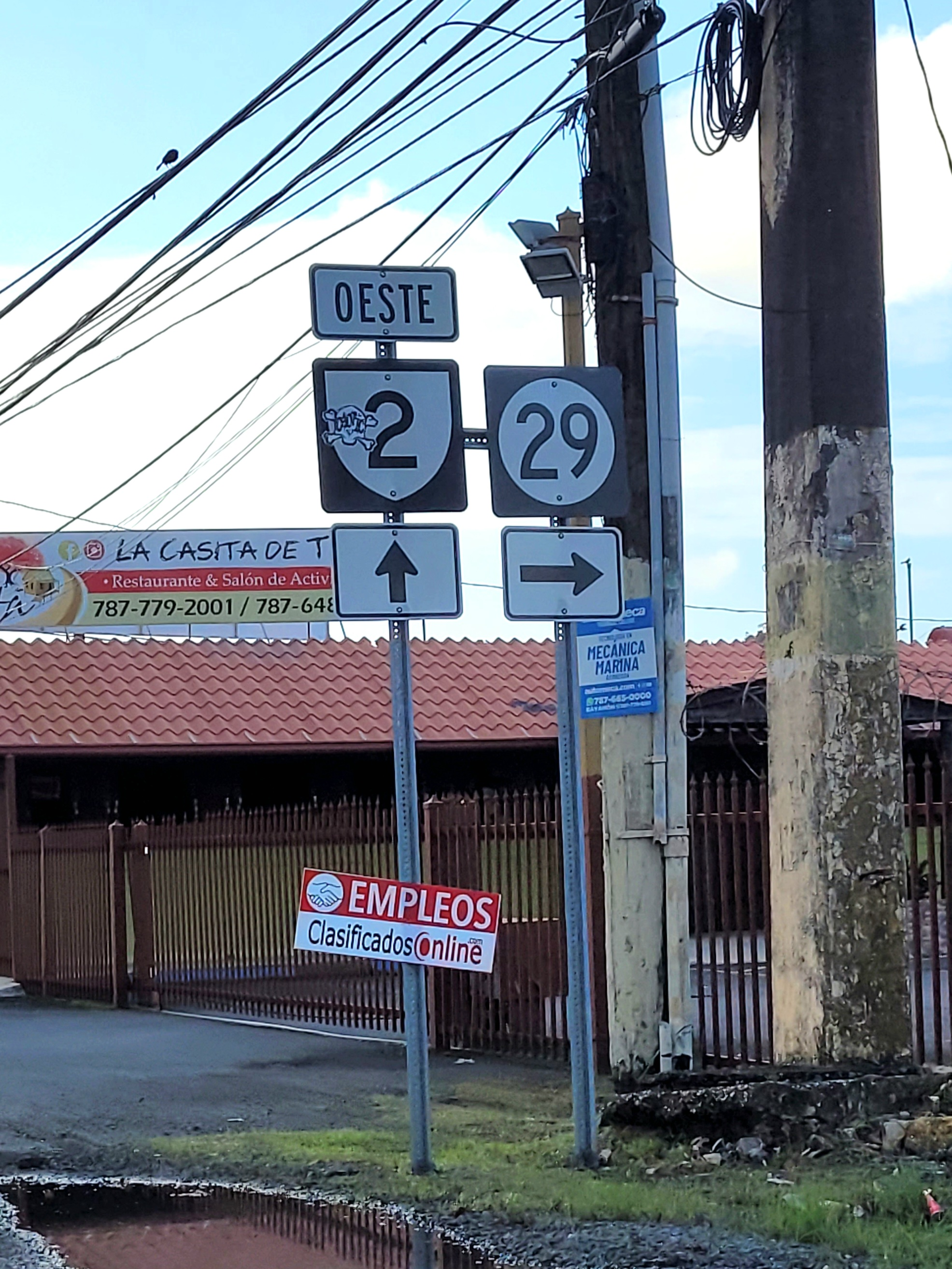
PR-2 west at PR-29 intersection in Hato Tejas

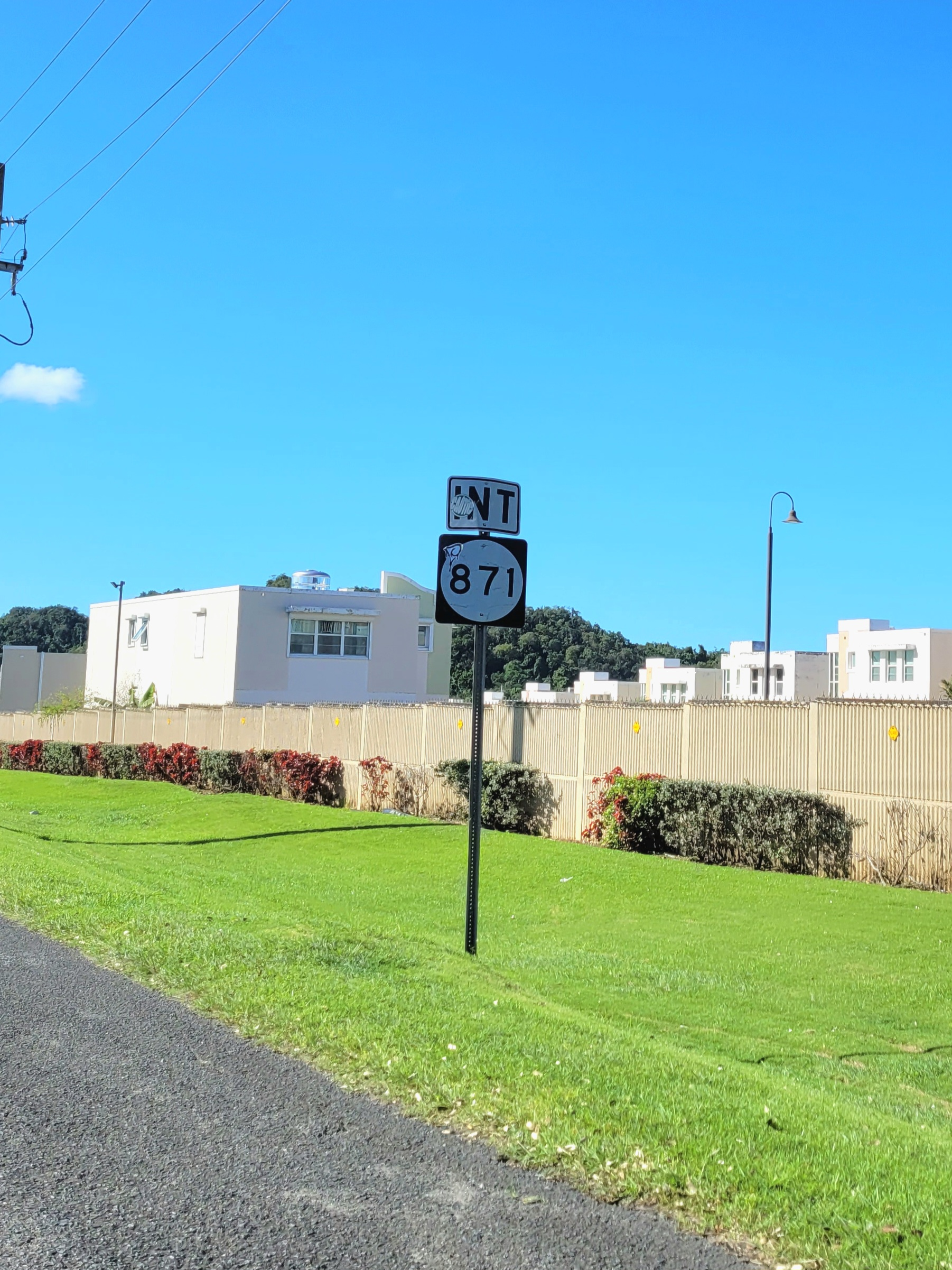
PR-29 west near PR-871 intersection in Hato Tejas

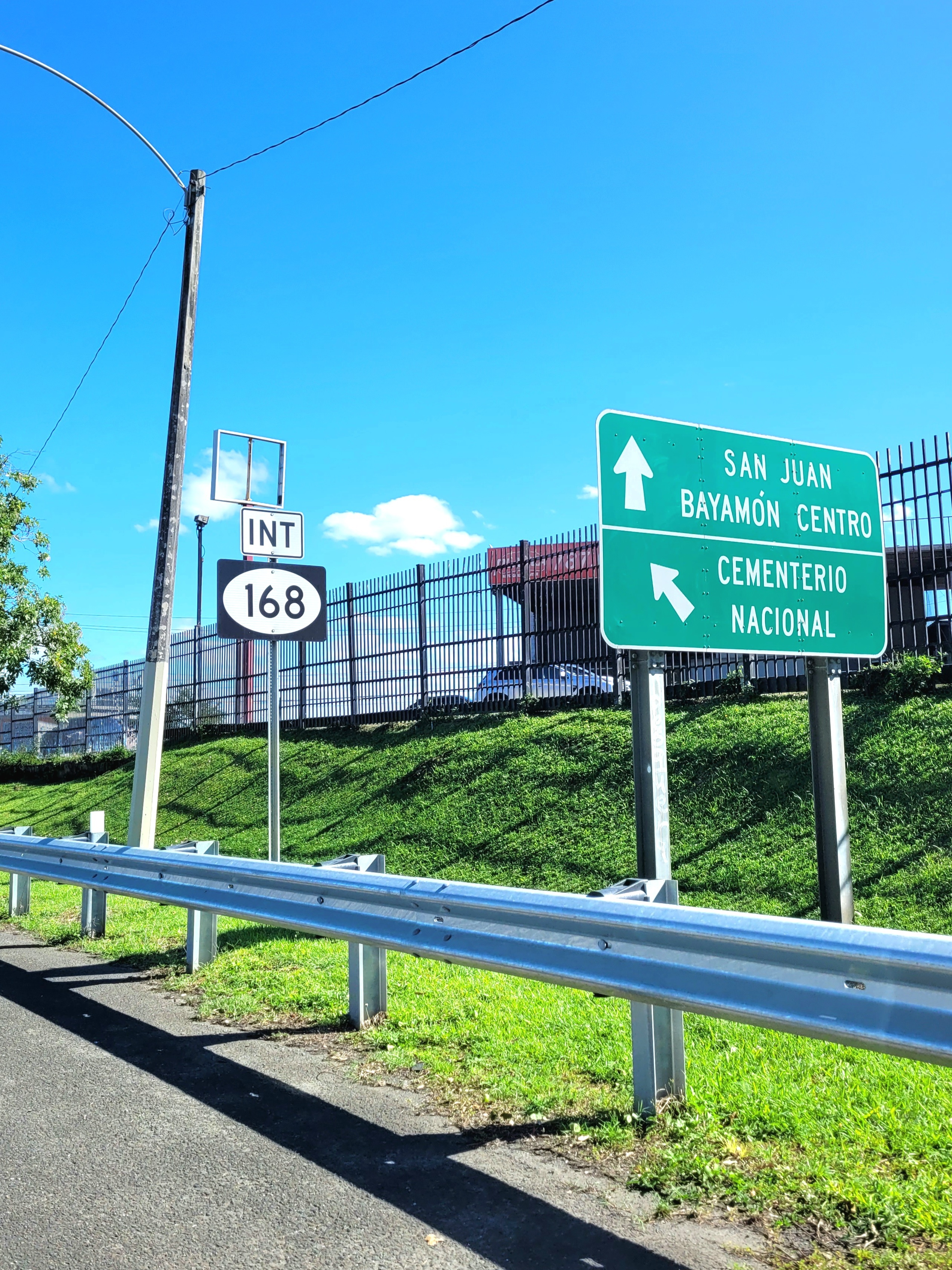
PR-29 east near PR-168 junction in Hato Tejas

Location	km	mi	Destinations	Notes
Hato Tejas	0.0	0.0	PR-2 – Bayamón, Arecibo	Western terminus of PR-29
Hato Tejas	0.2– 0.3	0.12– 0.19	PR-871 (Carretera Volcán) – El Volcán	
Hato Tejas	0.6– 0.7	0.37– 0.43	PR-872 (Avenida Río Hondo) – Sabana Seca	
Hato Tejas	1.0– 1.1	0.62– 0.68	PR-168 (Avenida Cementerio Nacional) – Cementerio Nacional	
Hato Tejas	1.7	1.1	PR-Avenida Gilberto Concepción de Gracia – Sierra Bayamón	
Hato Tejas	2.7	1.7	PR-167 (Avenida Ramón Luis Rivera) – Bayamón Centro, Levittown	
Juan Sánchez	3.2	2.0	PR-890 (Calle Degetau) – Bayamón Centro	
Juan Sánchez	3.5	2.2	PR-5 (Expreso Río Hondo) – Bayamón, Cataño	Eastern terminus of PR-29; trumpet interchange
1.000 mi = 1.609 km; 1.000 km = 0.621 mi
