= Puerto Rico Highway 6 =

Highway in Puerto Rico

Highway 6
- Ruta 6
- Calle San José
- PR-6 highlighted in red

Route information
- Maintained by Puerto Rico DTPW
- Length: 1.7 km (1.1 mi)

Major junctions
- South end: PR-2 in Juan Sánchez
- North end: PR-5 in Juan Sánchez

Location
- Country: United States
- Territory: Puerto Rico
- Municipalities: Bayamón

Highway system
- Roads in Puerto Rico; List
← PR-5	→ PR-8

Puerto Rico Highway 6 (PR‑6) is a 1.7-kilometer (1.1-mile) long north‑south urban primary highway within the barrio of Juan Sánchez in the municipality of Bayamón, Puerto Rico, that serves as a by-pass route from Puerto Rico Highway 5 (PR‑5) to Puerto Rico Highway 2 (PR‑2). The entire route is also known as Expresito de Villa España or Calle San José (San José Street).

== Route description ==
PR‑6 begins at a three-way junction with PR‑2 on the southern edge of the Villa España neighborhood, a gated and planned community in central Juan Sánchez. (PR‑2 heads east toward the municipality of Guaynabo and west thorough the northern part of Bayamón.) From its southern terminus, PR‑6 heads north-northwest as a divided four-lane road and almost immediately has an intersection with the west access road to Villa España. (Other than its termini, this is the only intersection along PR‑6.) From that intersection PR‑6 turns northwest to run along the western edge of Villa España, past its northern edge. Shortly thereafter, the route turns north-northeast and reaches its northern terminus at a trumpet interchange with PR‑5 (Expreso Río Hondo [Río Hondo Expressway]). (PR‑5 heads northeast toward San Juan and Carolina and southwest through Bayamón toward Aguas Buenas.)

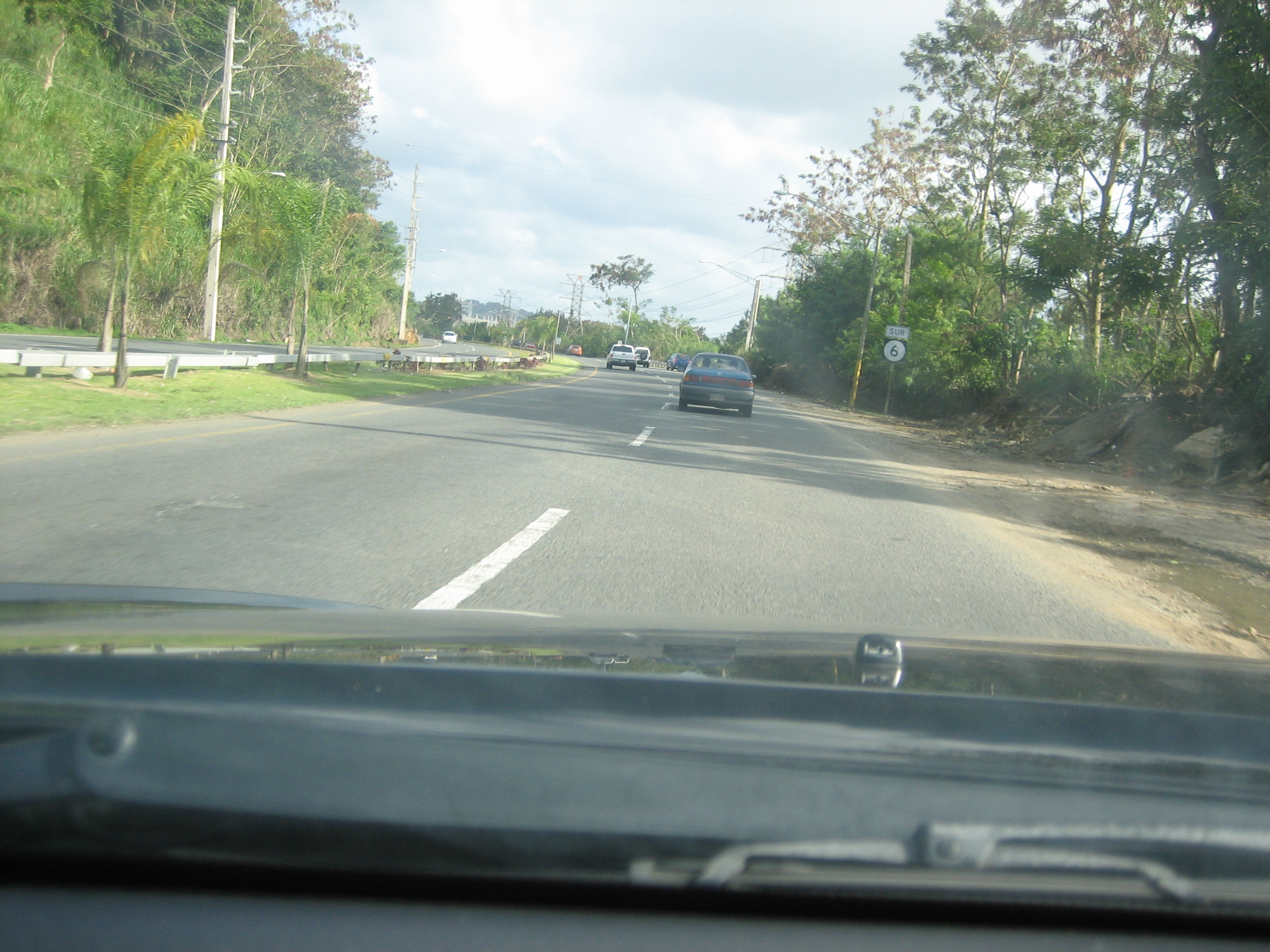
Heading south along Puerto Rico Highway 6, February 2008

== Major intersections ==
The entire route is located in Juan Sánchez, Bayamón.

km	mi	Destinations	Notes
0.0	0.0	PR-2 – Guaynabo, Bayamón	Southern terminus of PR-6
0.1– 0.2	0.062– 0.12	Villa España	Western access to Villa España
1.7	1.1	PR-5 – Bayamón, Cataño	Trumpet interchange; northern terminus of PR-6
1.000 mi = 1.609 km; 1.000 km = 0.621 mi
