= Puerto Rico Highway 28 =

Highway in Puerto Rico

Highway 28
- Ruta 28
- Avenida Francisco José de Goya

Route information
- Maintained by Puerto Rico DTPW
- Length: 6.0 km (3.7 mi)

Major junctions
- West end: PR-5 in Juan Sánchez
- PR-165 in Pueblo Viejo
- East end: PR-2 in Gobernador Piñero

Location
- Country: United States
- Territory: Puerto Rico
- Municipalities: Bayamón, Guaynabo, San Juan

Highway system
- Roads in Puerto Rico; List
← PR-27	→ PR-29

Puerto Rico Highway 28 (PR-28) is a road that extends from Bayamón, Puerto Rico to the Port of San Juan. This highway extends from Expreso Río Hondo (PR-5) to Expreso John F. Kennedy (PR-2) and it is known as Avenida Francisco José de Goya.

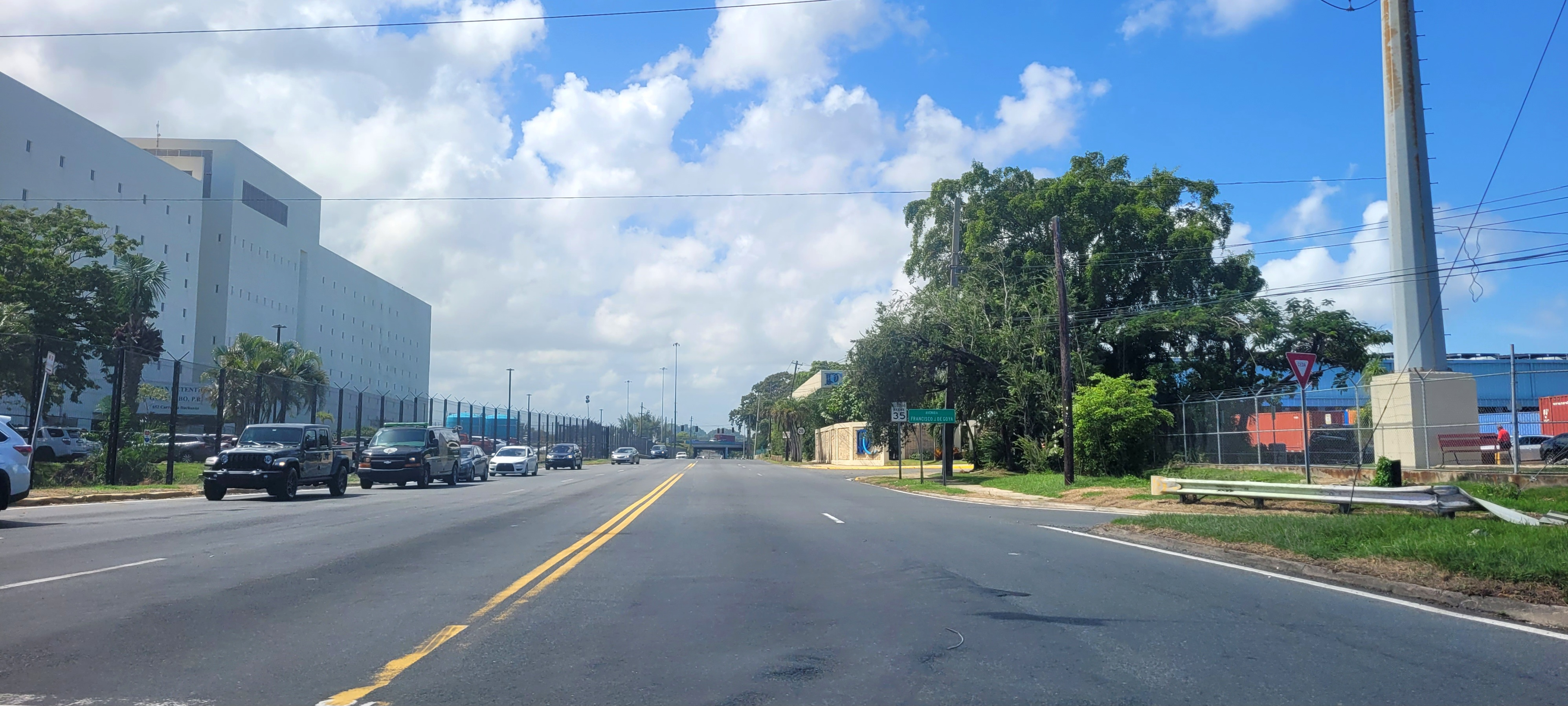
Puerto Rico Highway 28 in Pueblo Viejo, Guaynabo, looking west

== Major intersections ==
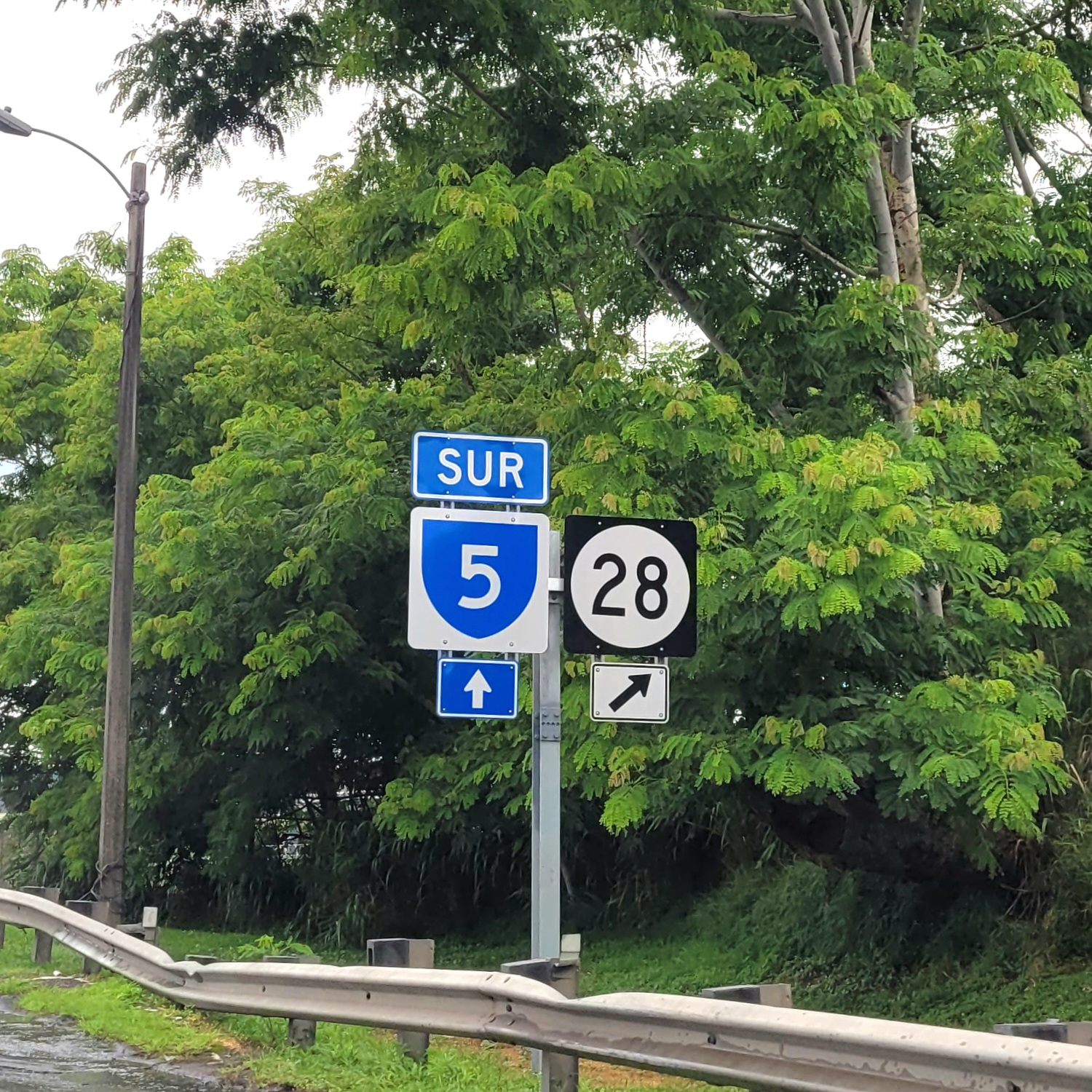
PR-5 south at PR-28 intersection in Bayamón

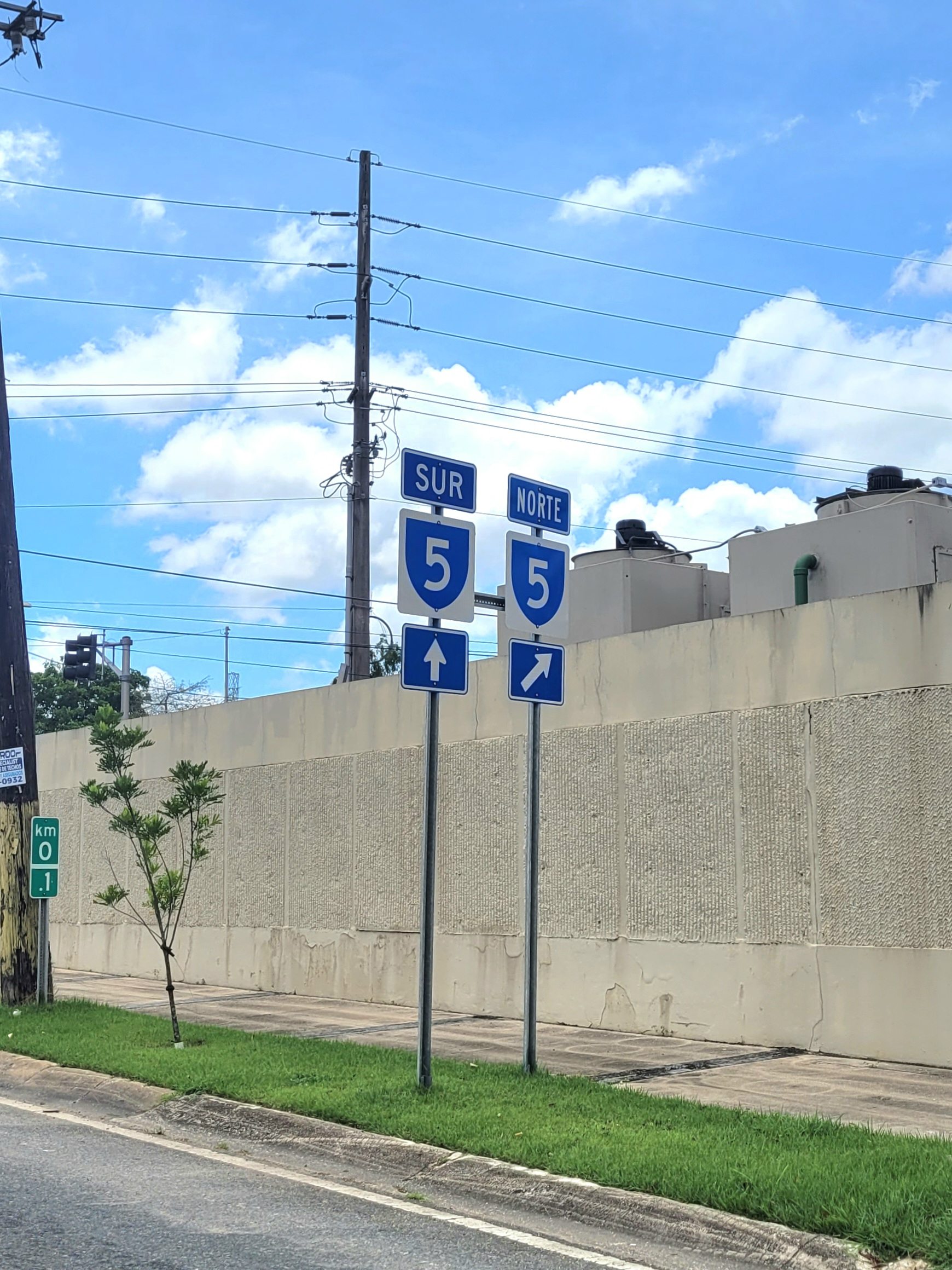
PR-28 west at PR-5 junction in Bayamón

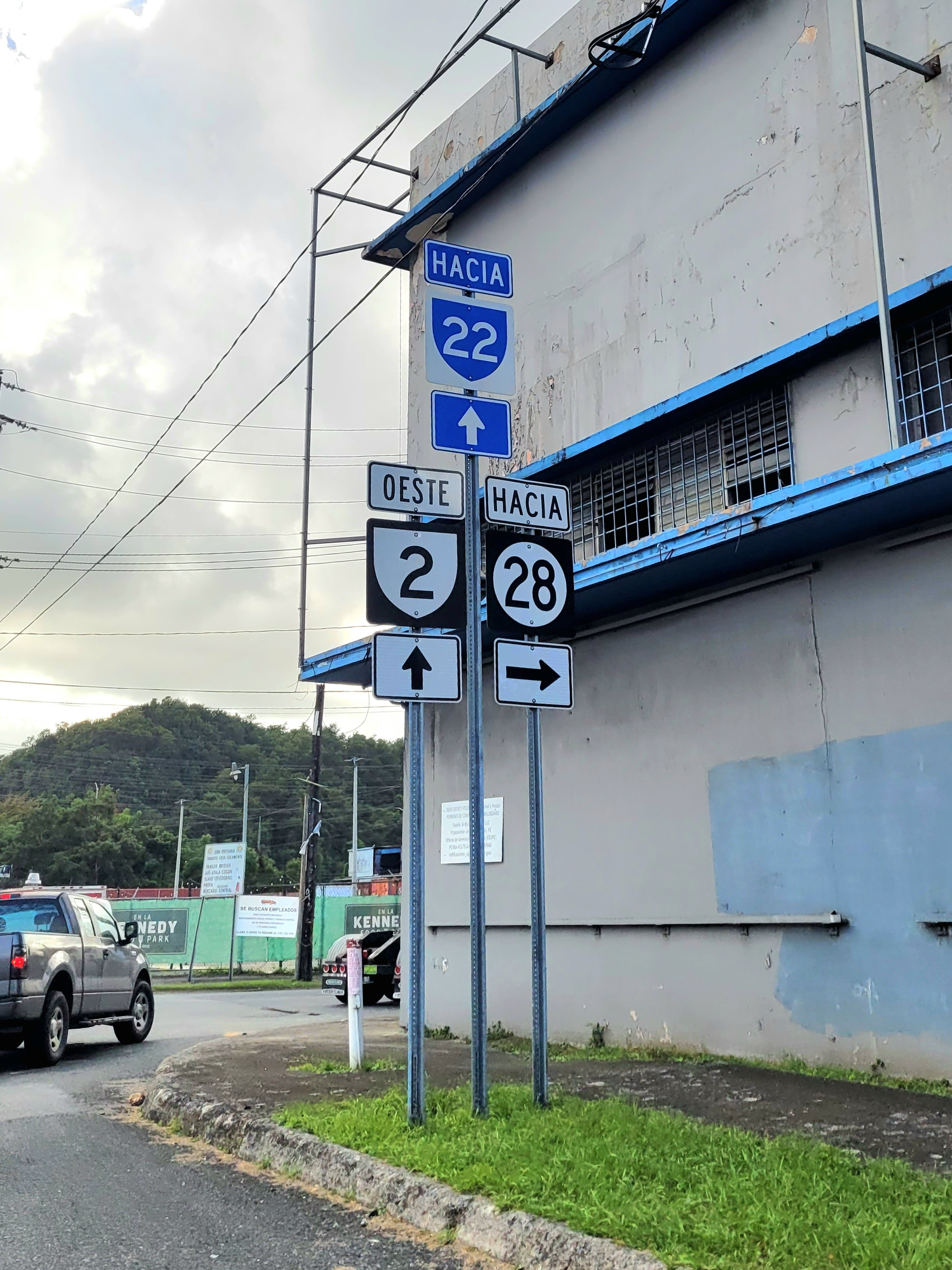
PR-2 west at PR-28 intersection near the Port of San Juan

Municipality	Location	km	mi	Destinations	Notes
Bayamón	Juan Sánchez	0.0	0.0	PR-5	Diamond interchange; western terminus of PR-28; access to Bayamón and Cataño
Guaynabo	Pueblo Viejo	4.3	2.7	PR-165	Access to Cataño, Guaynabo and San Juan
San Juan	Gobernador Piñero	6.0	3.7	PR-2 east	Interchange; eastern terminus of PR-28; westbound access is via Calle Monterrey; access to San Juan and Guaynabo; unsigned
1.000 mi = 1.609 km; 1.000 km = 0.621 mi: Incomplete access

== See also ==
- Francisco Goya
