= Puerto Rico Highway 869 =

Highway in Puerto Rico

Highway 869
- Ruta 869
- Carretera Industrial

Route information
- Maintained by Puerto Rico DTPW
- Length: 4.7 km (2.9 mi)

Major junctions
- South end: PR-5 in Palmas
- PR-22 in Palmas–Juan Sánchez; PR-8869 in Palmas
- North end: PR-165 in Palmas

Location
- Country: United States
- Territory: Puerto Rico
- Municipalities: Cataño

Highway system
- Roads in Puerto Rico; List
← PR-866	→ PR-870
← PR-8838	PR-8869	→ PR-9185

Puerto Rico Highway 869 (PR-869) is a north–south road located in Cataño, Puerto Rico. It begins at its intersection with PR-5 and PR-22 (Autopista José de Diego) near Bayamón municipal limit and ends at its junction with PR-165 near Toa Baja municipal limit.

Puerto Rico Highway 869

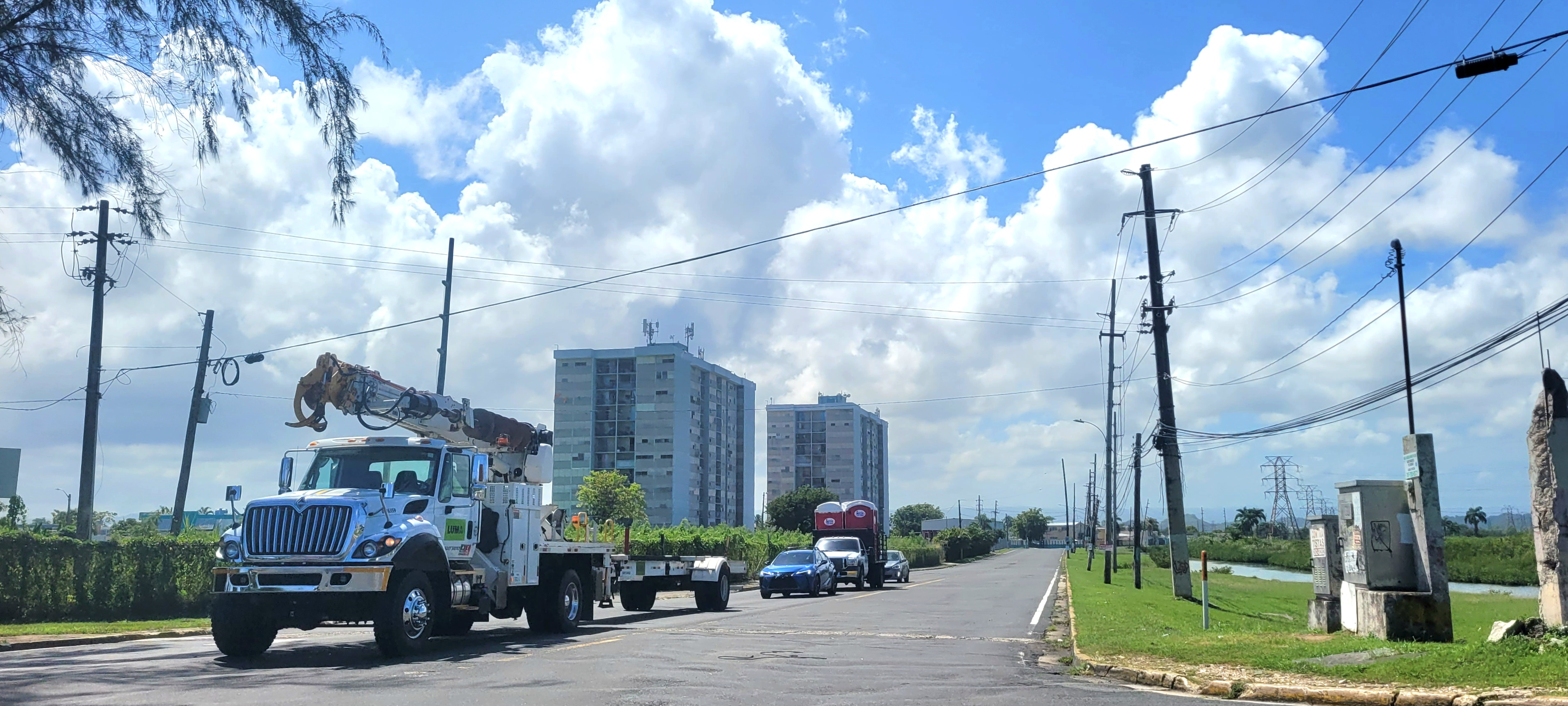
Northern terminus at PR-165 junction, looking south

== Major intersections ==
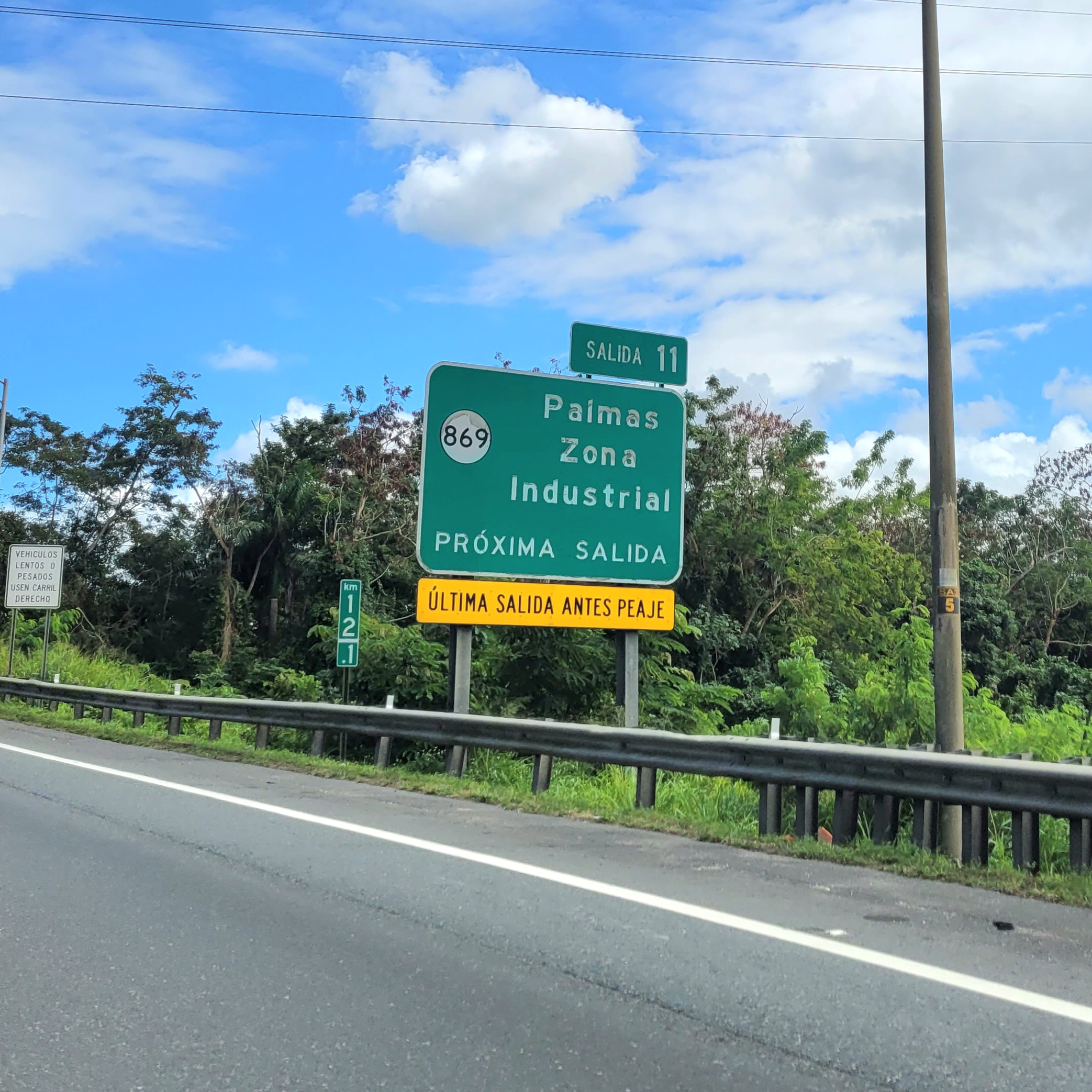
PR-22 east near exit 11 to PR-869 north between Bayamón and Cataño

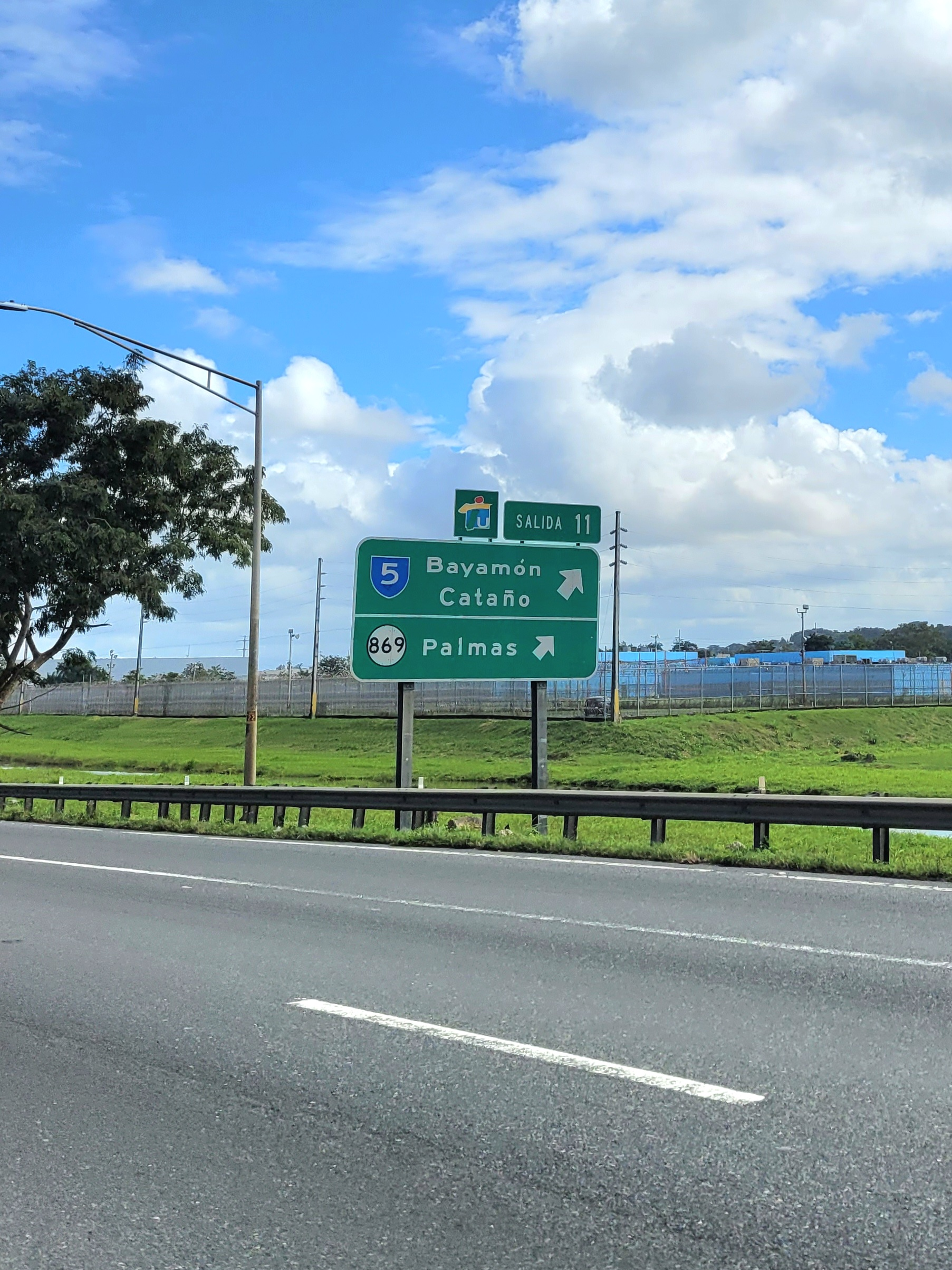
PR-22 east at exit 11 to PR-5 and PR-869 north between Bayamón and Cataño

Municipality	Location	km	mi	Destinations	Notes
Cataño	Palmas	0.0	0.0	PR-5 – Bayamón, Cataño	Southern terminus of PR-869
Cataño–Bayamón municipal line	Palmas–Juan Sánchez line	0.6– 0.7	0.37– 0.43	PR-22 (Autopista José de Diego) – San Juan, Arecibo	PR-22 exits 11 and 13; diamond interchange
Cataño	Palmas	2.2	1.4	PR-8869 – Cucharillas	
Cataño	Palmas	4.7	2.9	PR-165 (Avenida El Caño) – Cataño, Dorado	Northern terminus of PR-869
1.000 mi = 1.609 km; 1.000 km = 0.621 mi

== Related route ==
Highway 8869
- Location: Cataño
- Length: 2.6 km (1.6 mi)

Puerto Rico Highway 8869 (PR-8869) is a spur route located in Palmas barrio. It begins at PR-869 in Cucharillas community and ends at its junction with PR-5 near Puente Blanco community. The entire route is located in Palmas, Cataño.

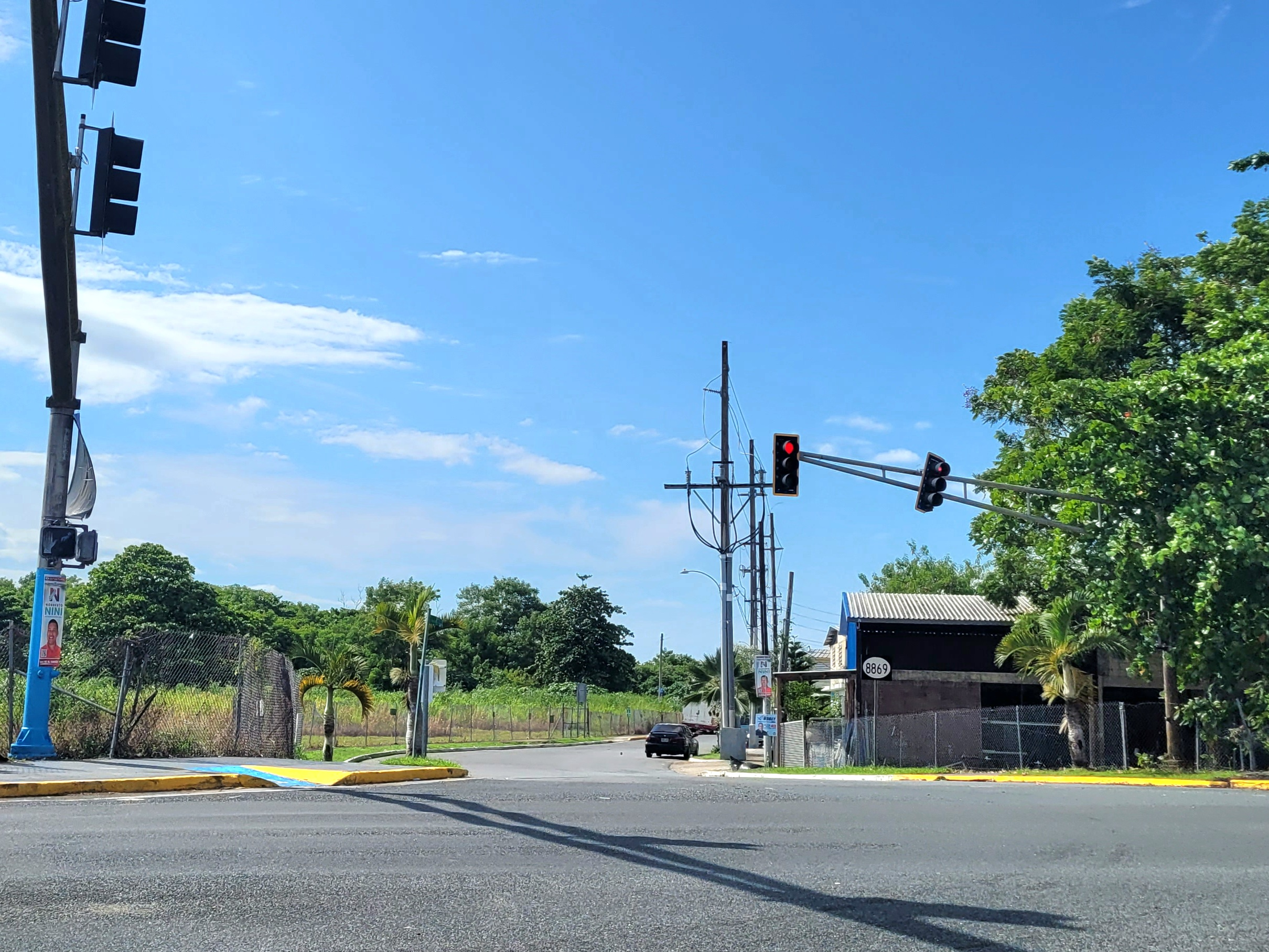
Eastern terminus of PR-8869 at PR-5 junction, looking west

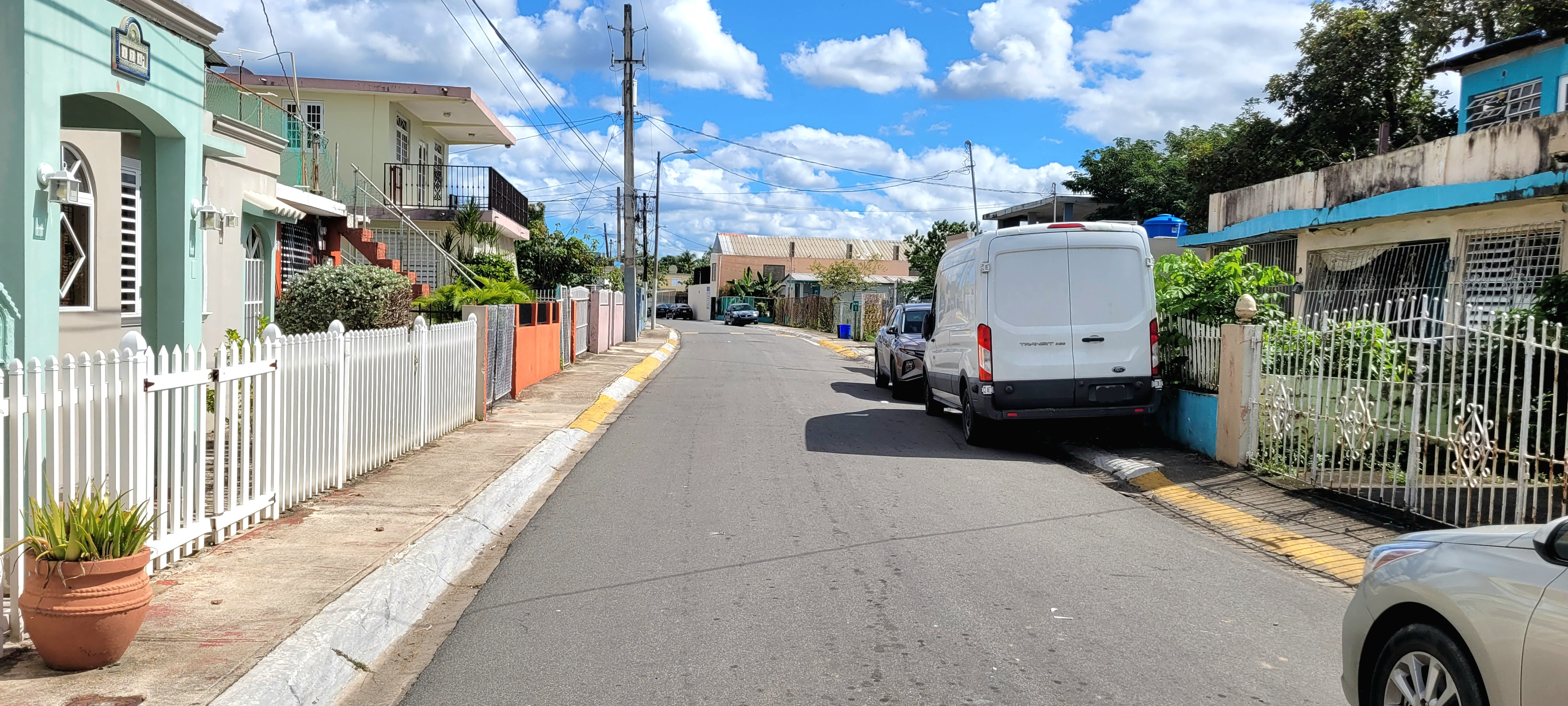
PR-8869 looking east

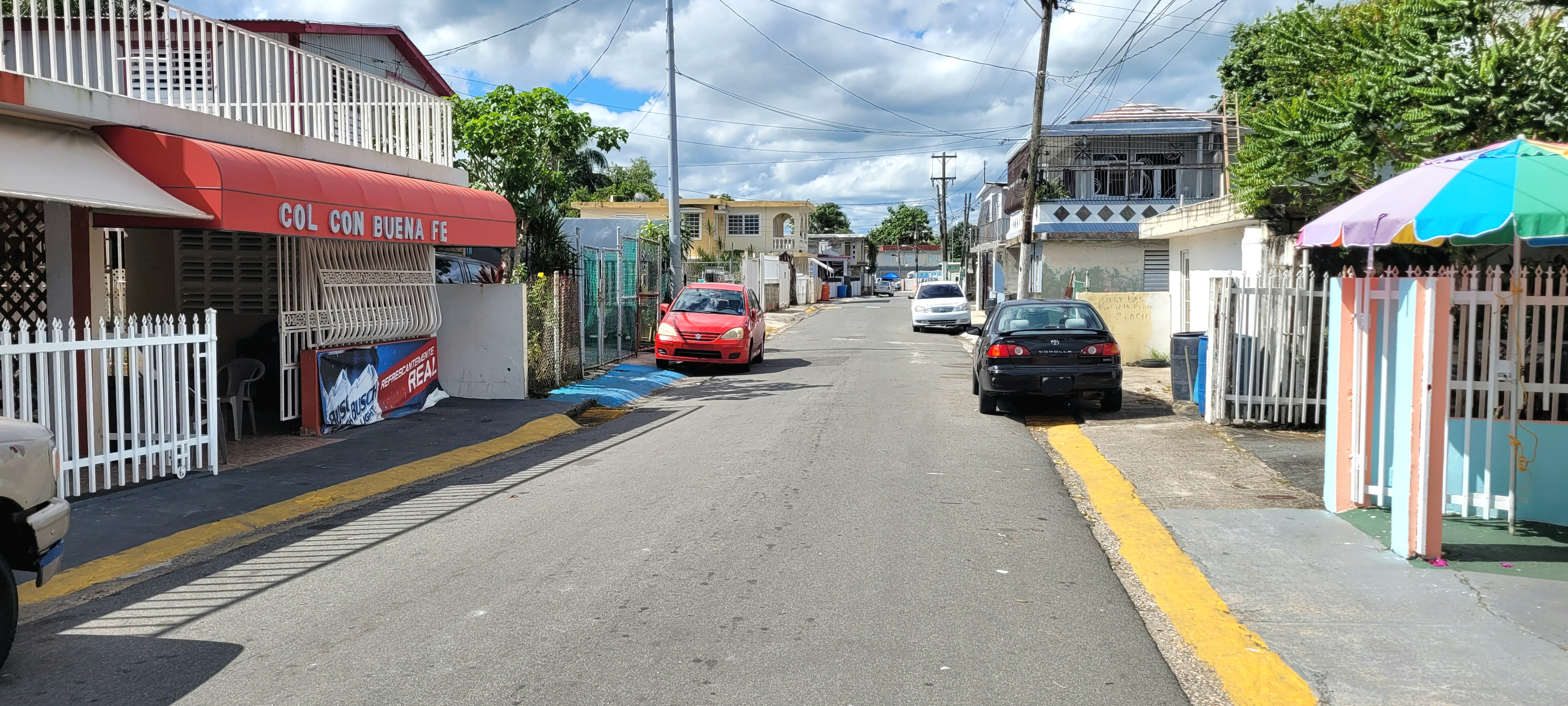
PR-8869 looking west

km	mi	Destinations	Notes
0.0	0.0	PR-869	Western terminus of PR-8869; unsigned
2.6	1.6	PR-5 – Cataño Centro, San Juan, Bayamón	Eastern terminus of PR-8869
1.000 mi = 1.609 km; 1.000 km = 0.621 mi
