= Puerto Rico Highway 168 =

Highway in Bayamón, Puerto Rico

Highway 168
- Ruta 168
- Avenida Cementerio Nacional

Route information
- Maintained by Puerto Rico DTPW
- Length: 1.7 km (1.1 mi)

Major junctions
- South end: PR-2 in Hato Tejas
- PR-872 in Hato Tejas; PR-29 in Hato Tejas
- North end: Calle Reverendo Domingo Marrero Navarro / Calle Río Cialitos in Hato Tejas

Location
- Country: United States
- Territory: Puerto Rico
- Municipalities: Bayamón

Highway system
- Roads in Puerto Rico; List
← PR-167	→ PR-169

Puerto Rico Highway 168 (PR-168) is a road located in Bayamón, Puerto Rico. This highway extends from PR-2 in Hato Tejas to the Puerto Rico National Cemetery.

== Major intersections ==
The entire route is located in Hato Tejas, Bayamón.

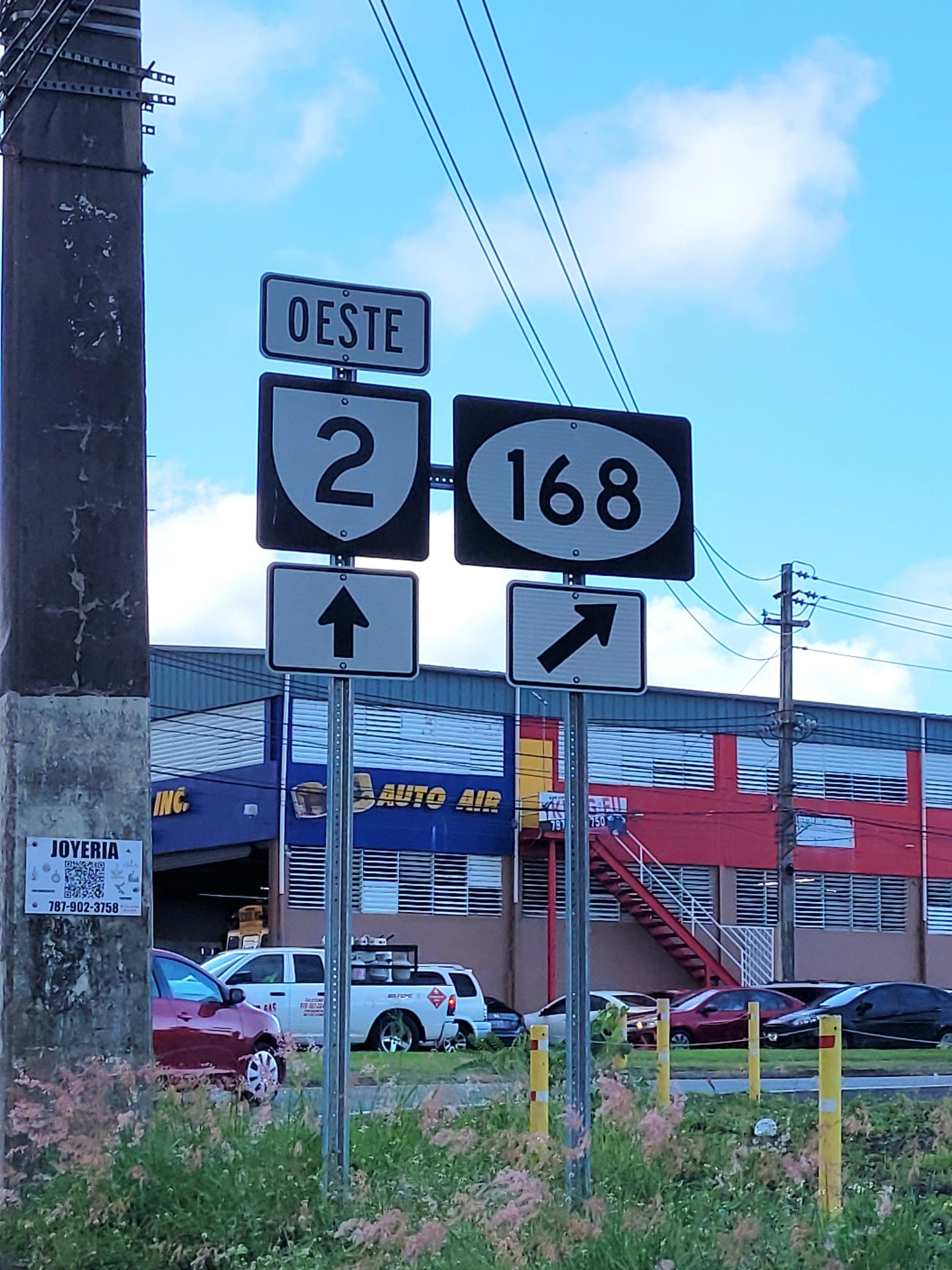
PR-2 at its junction with PR-168 in Hato Tejas

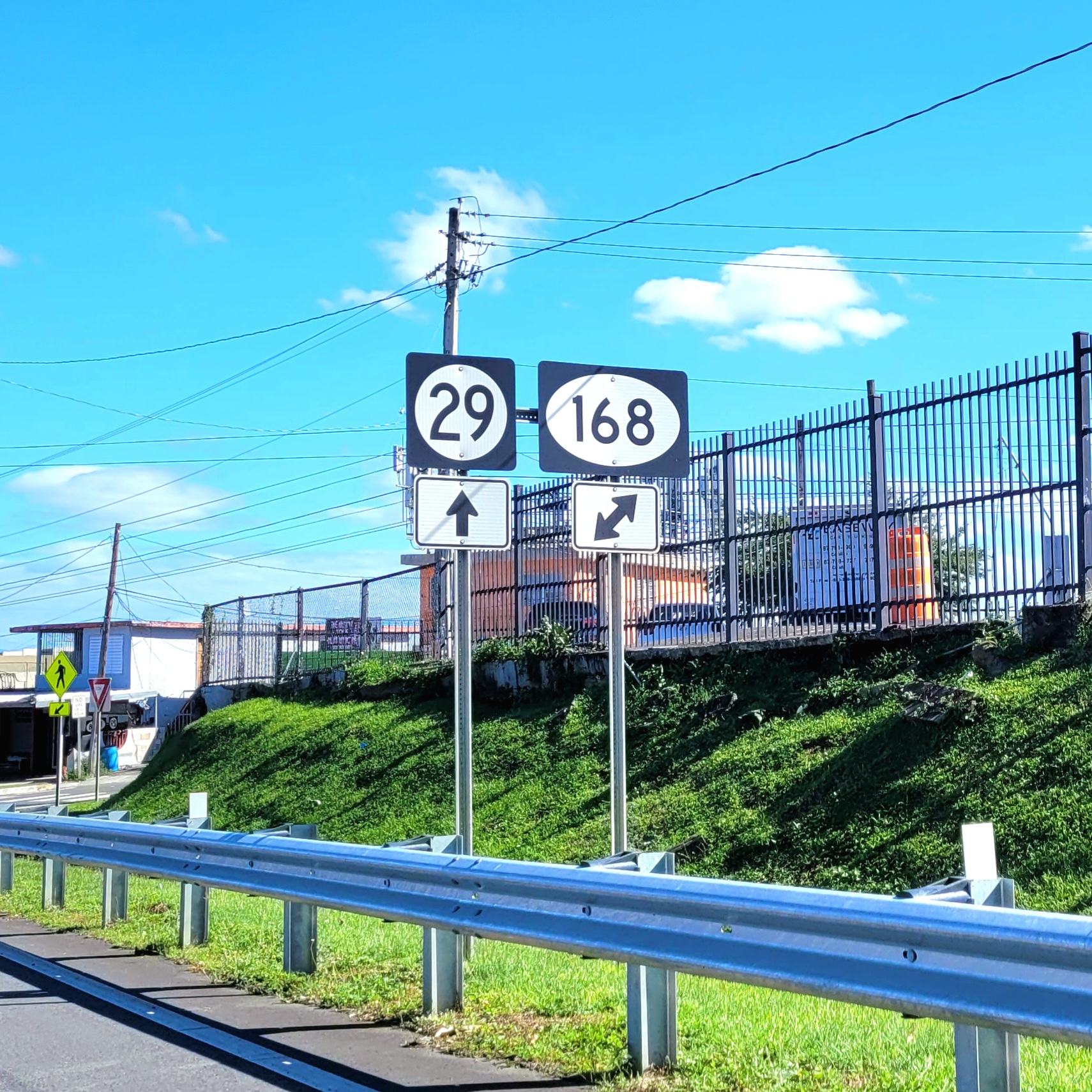
PR-29 at its junction with PR-168 in Hato Tejas

km	mi	Destinations	Notes
0.0	0.0	PR-2 – Bayamón, Arecibo	Southern terminus of PR-168
0.2	0.12	PR-872 (Avenida Río Hondo) – Bayamón, Sabana Seca	
0.4– 0.5	0.25– 0.31	PR-29 (Avenida Main Oeste) – Bayamón	
1.7	1.1	PR-Calle Reverendo Domingo Marrero Navarro / PR-Calle Río Cialitos – Bayamón	Northern terminus of PR-168
1.000 mi = 1.609 km; 1.000 km = 0.621 mi
