= Minillas, Bayamón, Puerto Rico =

Barrio of Puerto Rico

Minillas
- Barrio
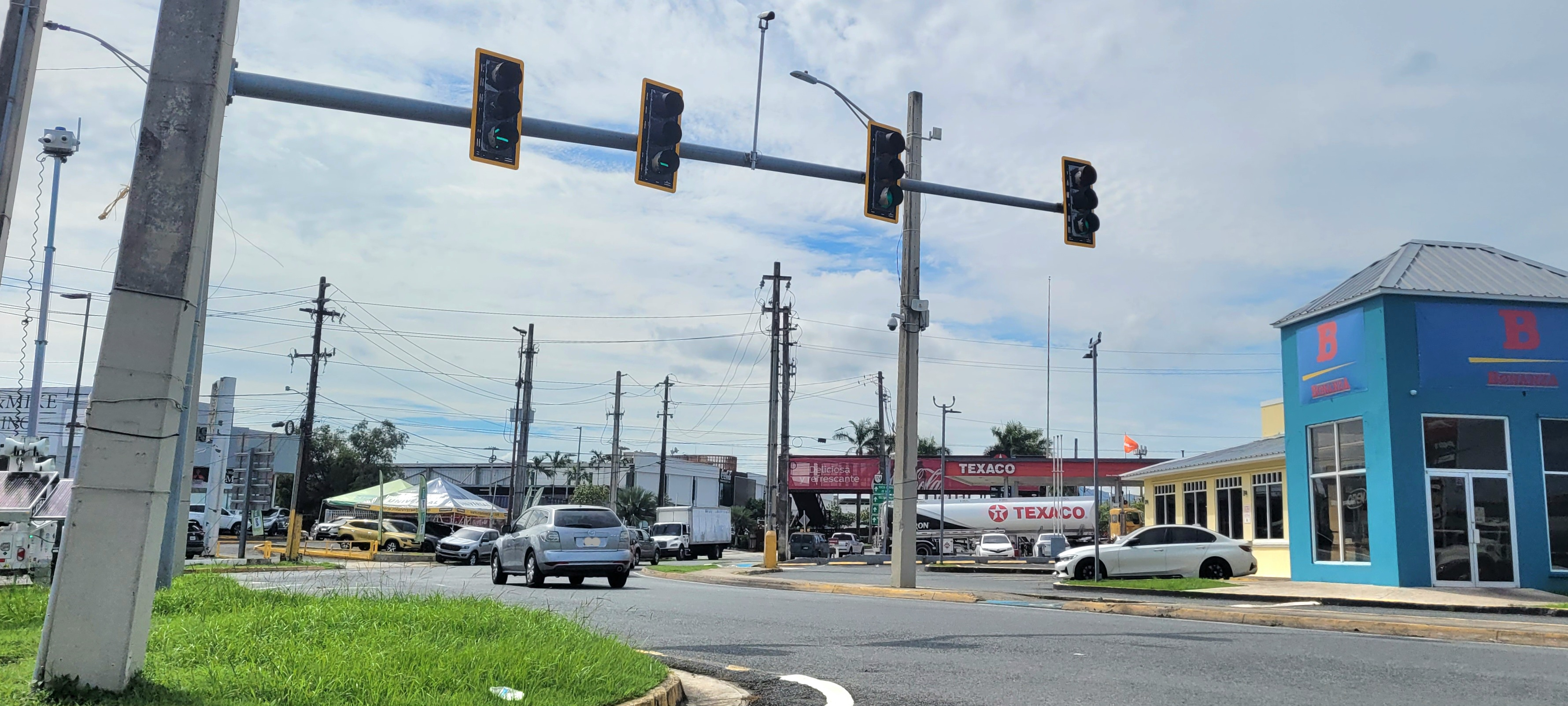
- Puerto Rico Highway 174 between Juan Sánchez and Minillas

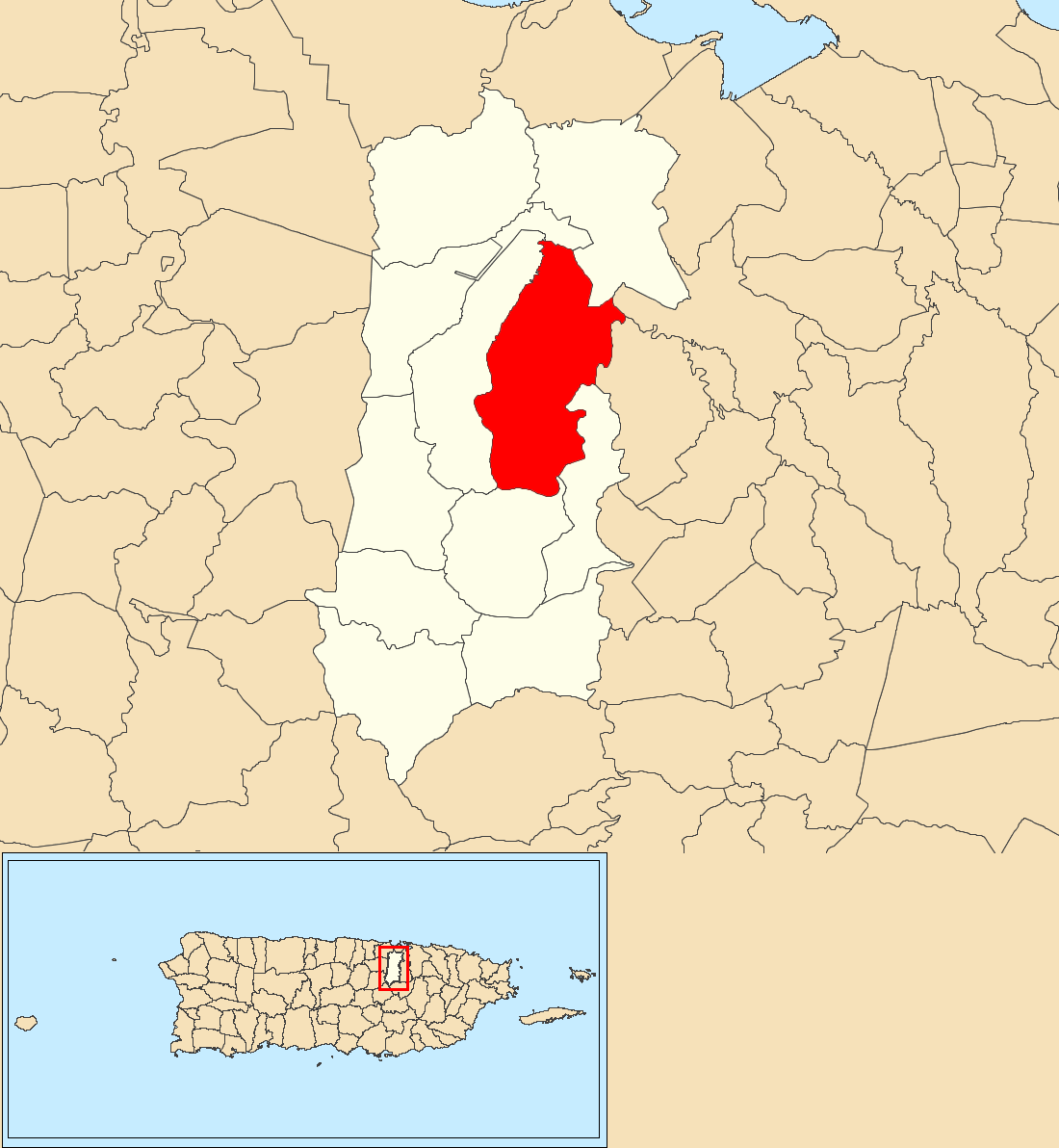
- Location of Minillas within the municipality of Bayamón shown in red

- Location of Puerto Rico
- Coordinates: 18°21′38″N 66°09′11″W
- Commonwealth: Puerto Rico
- Municipality: Bayamón

Area
  - Total: 5.83 sq mi (15.1 km^{2})
  - Land: 5.80 sq mi (15.0 km^{2})
  - Water: 0.03 sq mi (0.078 km^{2})
- Elevation: 121 ft (37 m)

Population (2010)
  - Total: 39,540
  - Density: 2,942.3/sq mi (1,136.0/km^{2})
- Source: 2010 Census
- Time zone: UTC−4 (AST)

Minillas is a barrio in the municipality of Bayamón, Puerto Rico. Its population in 2010 was 39,540.

== History ==
Minillas was in Spain's gazetteers until Puerto Rico was ceded by Spain in the aftermath of the Spanish–American War under the terms of the Treaty of Paris of 1898 and became an unincorporated territory of the United States. In 1899, the United States Department of War conducted a census of Puerto Rico finding that the population of Minillas barrio was 1000.

Historical population
Census	Pop.	Note	%±
1900	1,000		—
1910	1,436		43.6%
1920	1,458		1.5%
1930	1,630		11.8%
1940	1,784		9.4%
1950	2,519		41.2%
1960	9,093		261.0%
1970	0		−100.0%
1980	42,584		—
1990	42,420		−0.4%
2000	42,617		0.5%
2010	39,540		−7.2%
U.S. Decennial Census; 1899 (shown as 1900) 1910-1930; 1930-1950 1980-2000 2010

== See also ==
- List of communities in Puerto Rico
