= Juan Sánchez, Bayamón, Puerto Rico =

Barrio of Puerto Rico

Juan Sánchez
- Barrio
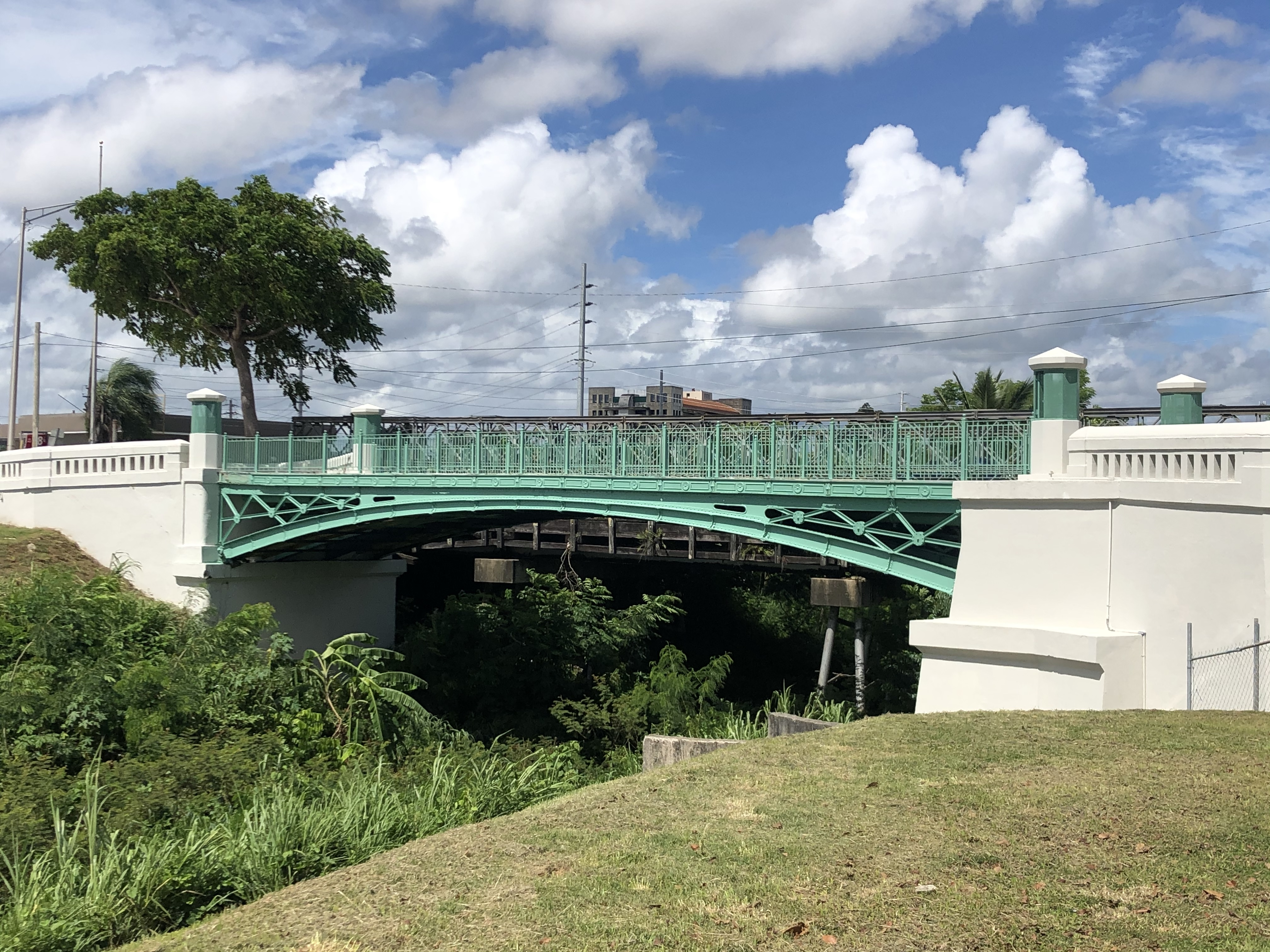
- Puente Marqués de la Serna is a historic bridge in Juan Sánchez

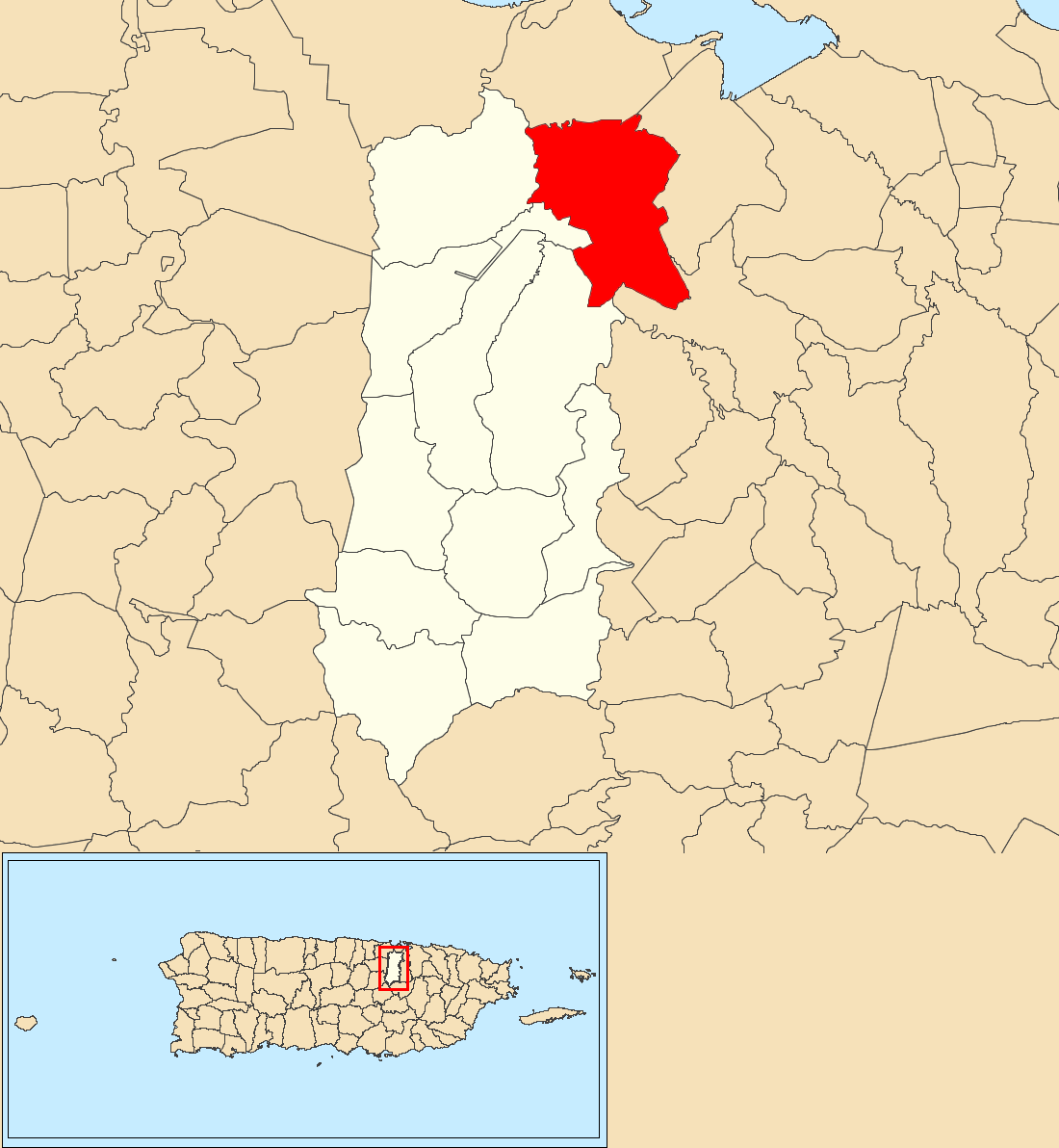
- Location of Juan Sánchez within the municipality of Bayamón shown in red

- Location of Puerto Rico
- Coordinates: 18°24′08″N 66°08′13″W
- Commonwealth: Puerto Rico
- Municipality: Bayamón

Area
  - Total: 5.36 sq mi (13.9 km^{2})
  - Land: 5.26 sq mi (13.6 km^{2})
  - Water: 0.10 sq mi (0.26 km^{2})
- Elevation: 89 ft (27 m)

Population (2010)
  - Total: 22,951
  - Density: 1,731.2/sq mi (668.4/km^{2})
- Source: 2010 Census
- Time zone: UTC−4 (AST)

Juan Sánchez is a barrio in the municipality of Bayamón, Puerto Rico. Its population in 2010 was 22,951.

== History ==
Juan Sánchez was in Spain's gazetteers until Puerto Rico was ceded by Spain in the aftermath of the Spanish–American War under the terms of the Treaty of Paris of 1898 and became an unincorporated territory of the United States. In 1899, the United States Department of War conducted a census of Puerto Rico finding that the population of Juan Sánchez barrio was 926.

Historical population
Census	Pop.	Note	%±
1900	926		—
1910	961		3.8%
1920	1,345		40.0%
1930	1,424		5.9%
1940	3,421		140.2%
1950	2,477		−27.6%
1960	6,116		146.9%
1970	0		−100.0%
1980	15,369		—
1990	22,643		47.3%
2000	25,747		13.7%
2010	22,951		−10.9%
U.S. Decennial Census; 1899 (shown as 1900) 1910-1930; 1930-1950 1980-2000 2010

== Gallery ==
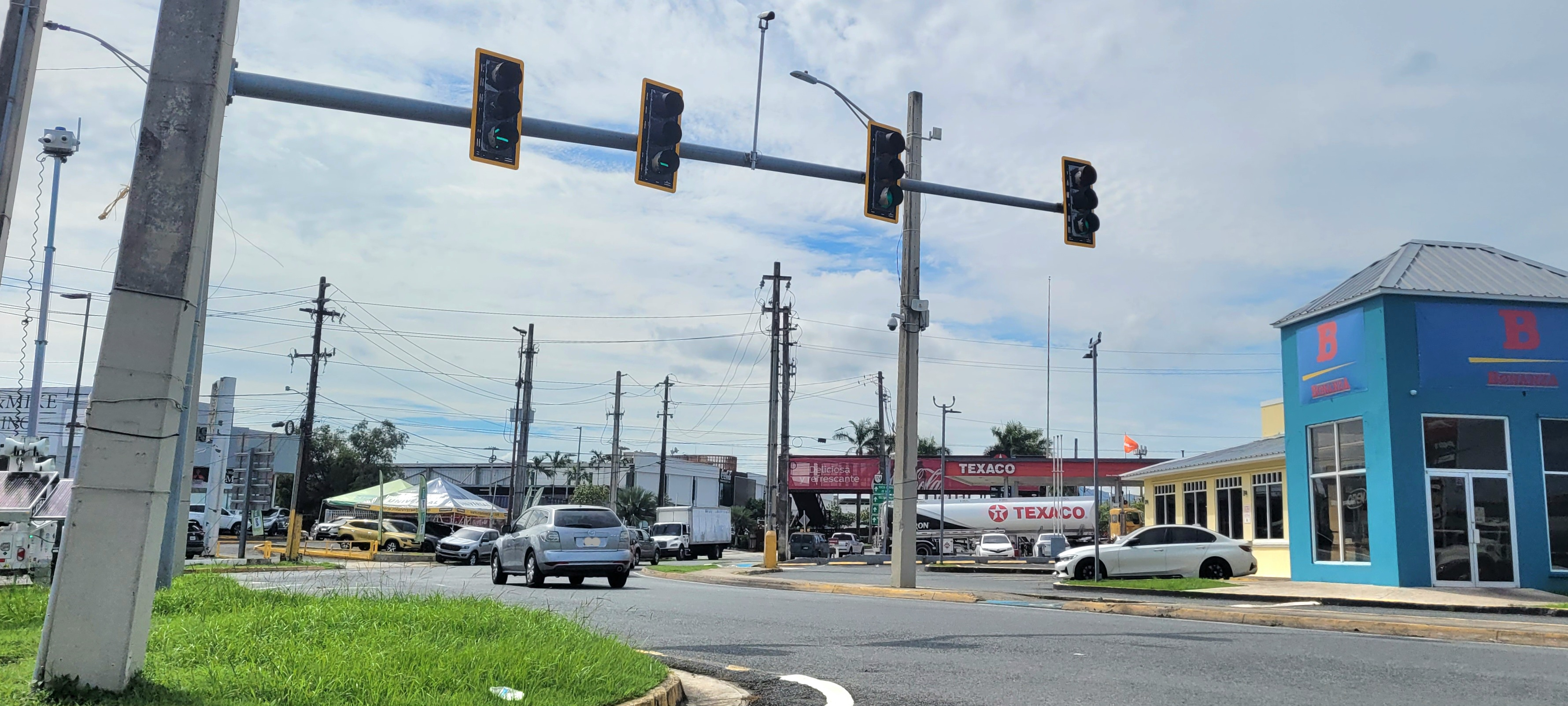
Puerto Rico Highway 174 between Juan Sánchez and Minillas

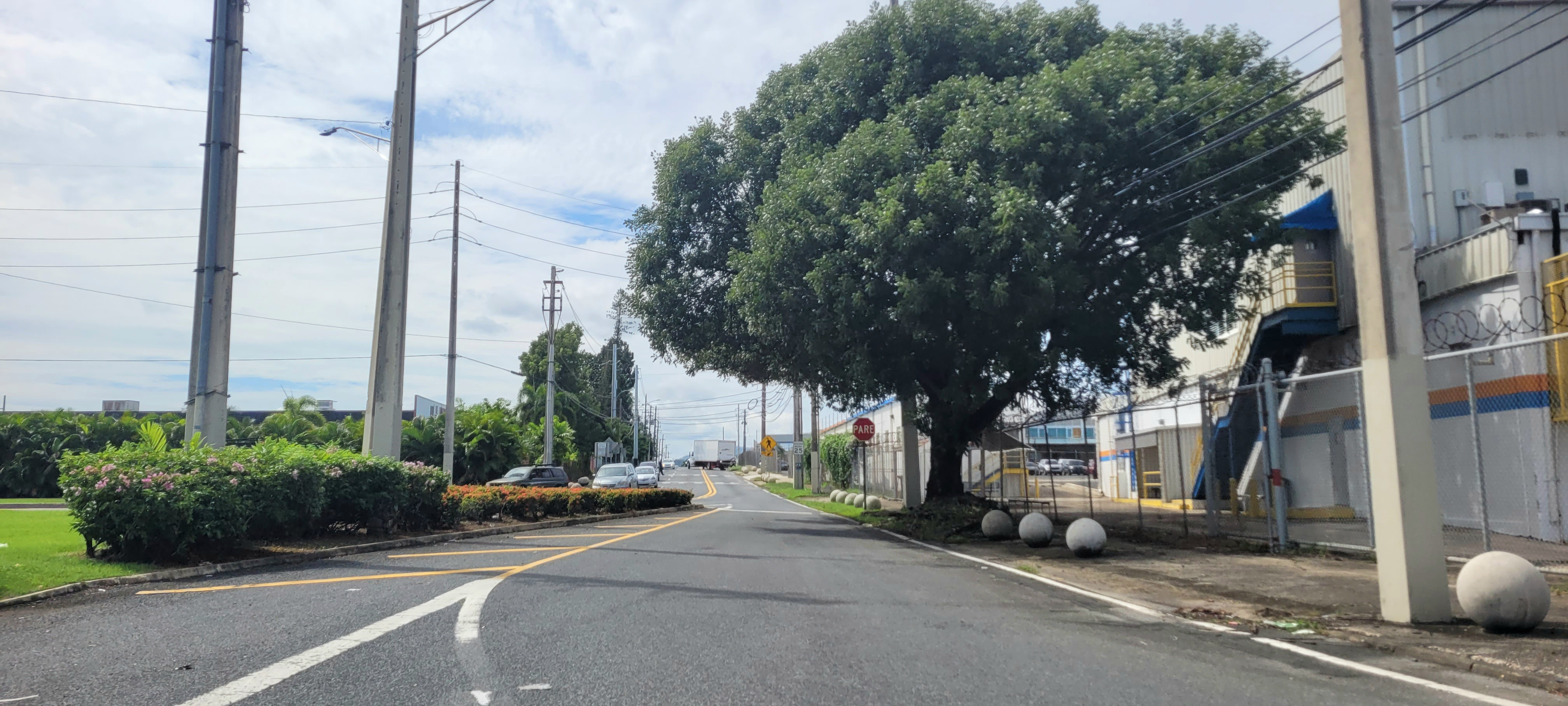
Puerto Rico Highway 889 in Juan Sánchez

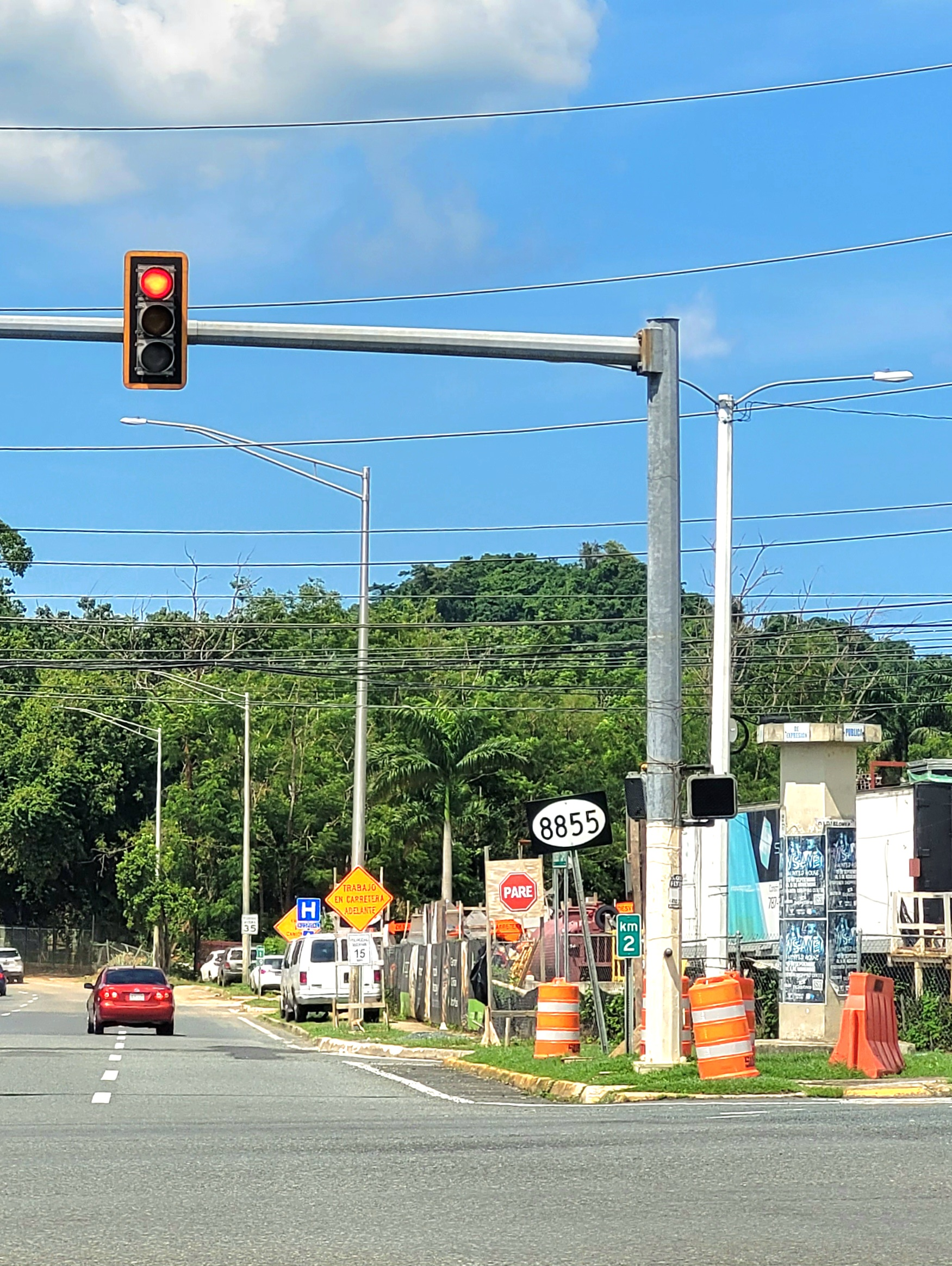
Puerto Rico Highway 8855 in Juan Sánchez

== See also ==
- List of communities in Puerto Rico
