= Puerto Rico Highway 152 =

Highway in Puerto Rico

Highway 152
- Ruta 152

Route information
- Maintained by Puerto Rico DTPW
- Length: 20.3 km (12.6 mi)
- Existed: 1953–present

Major junctions
- South end: PR-156 in Barranquitas barrio-pueblo–Quebradillas
- PR-152R in Quebradillas; PR-749 in Quebradillas; PR-773 in Quebradillas; PR-7773 in Quebradillas; PR-779 in Cedro Arriba; PR-802 / PR-803 in Cedro Arriba; PR-809 in Cedro Arriba; PR-811 in Cedro Abajo; PR-810 in Cedro Abajo; PR-814 in Cedro Abajo
- North end: PR-5 / PR-164 in Achiote–Naranjito barrio-pueblo

Location
- Country: United States
- Territory: Puerto Rico
- Municipalities: Barranquitas, Naranjito

Highway system
- Roads in Puerto Rico; List
← PR-151	→ PR-153
← PR-149R	PR-152R	→ PR-165R

Puerto Rico Highway 152 (PR-152) is a rural road that travels from Barranquitas to Naranjito in central Puerto Rico. This road extends from PR-156 in downtown Barranquitas and ends at its junction with PR-5 and PR-164 near downtown Naranjito.

== Route description ==
With a length of about 20.3 kilometers (12.6 mi), PR-152 begins at PR-156 junction located between downtown Barranquitas and Quebradillas barrio. Then, the highway goes north, meeting with PR-152R, a spur route that serves as a bypass located north and west of downtown. Also in Quebradillas barrio, PR-152 intersects with PR-749, the main highway to Quebrada Grande barrio; PR-773, which leads to Barrancas barrio, and also meets with PR-7773 before entering Naranjito.

After entering Naranjito, the highway crossess through Cedro Arriba, Cedro Abajo, Anones and Achiote barrios before its northern terminus near downtown area. In this municipality, PR-152 intersects with PR-779, a highway that leads to Comerío; PR-802, the main highway to Maná, a barrio in southern Corozal; PR-803, which leads to Corozal; PR-810, the main access to Higuillales, a neighborhood in Achiote barrio, and also intersects with PR-814, the main route to Anones barrio. PR-152 ends at PR-5 and PR-164 junction.

Puerto Rico Highway 152 by municipality

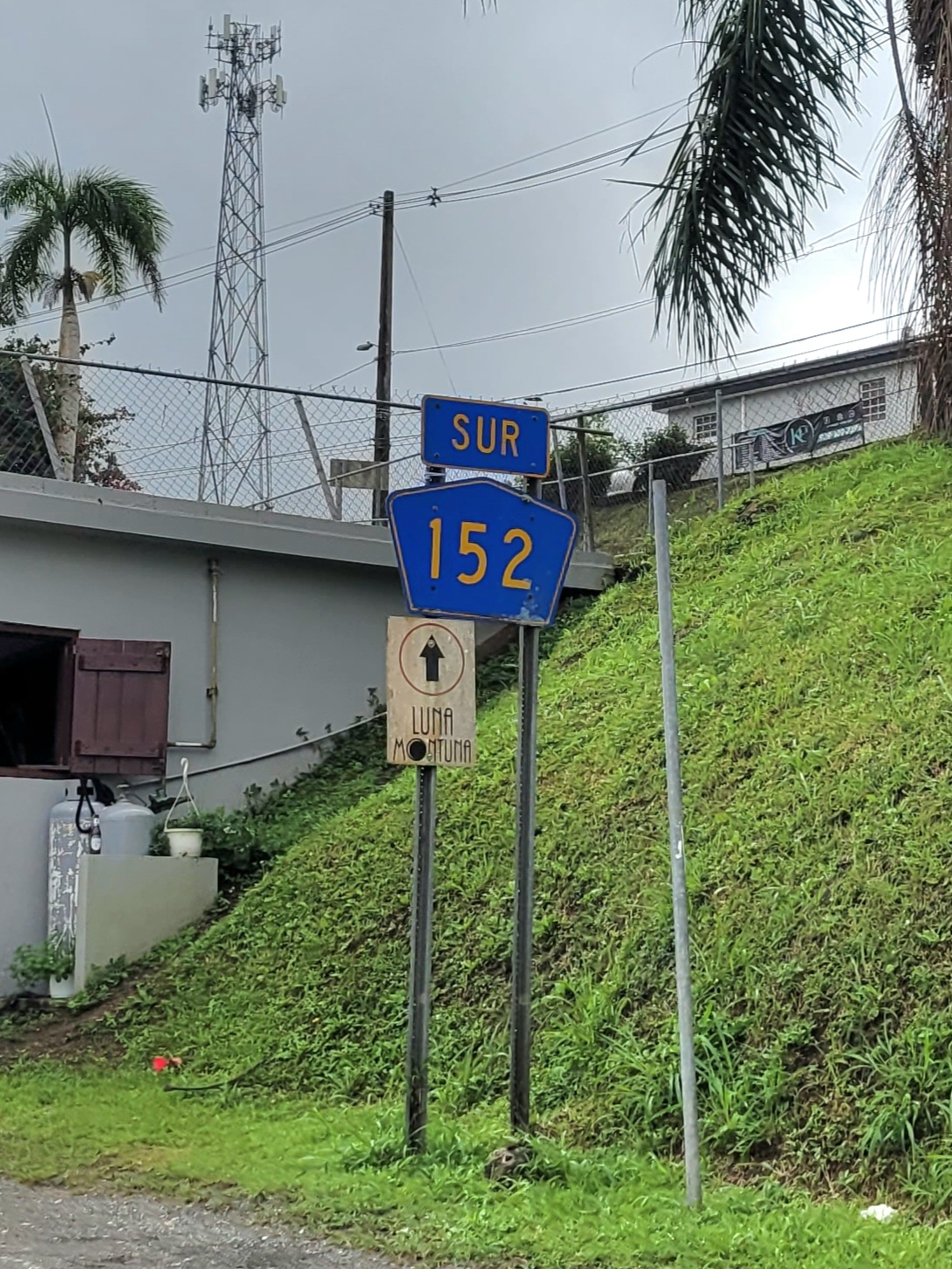
Southbound sign in Quebradillas, Barranquitas

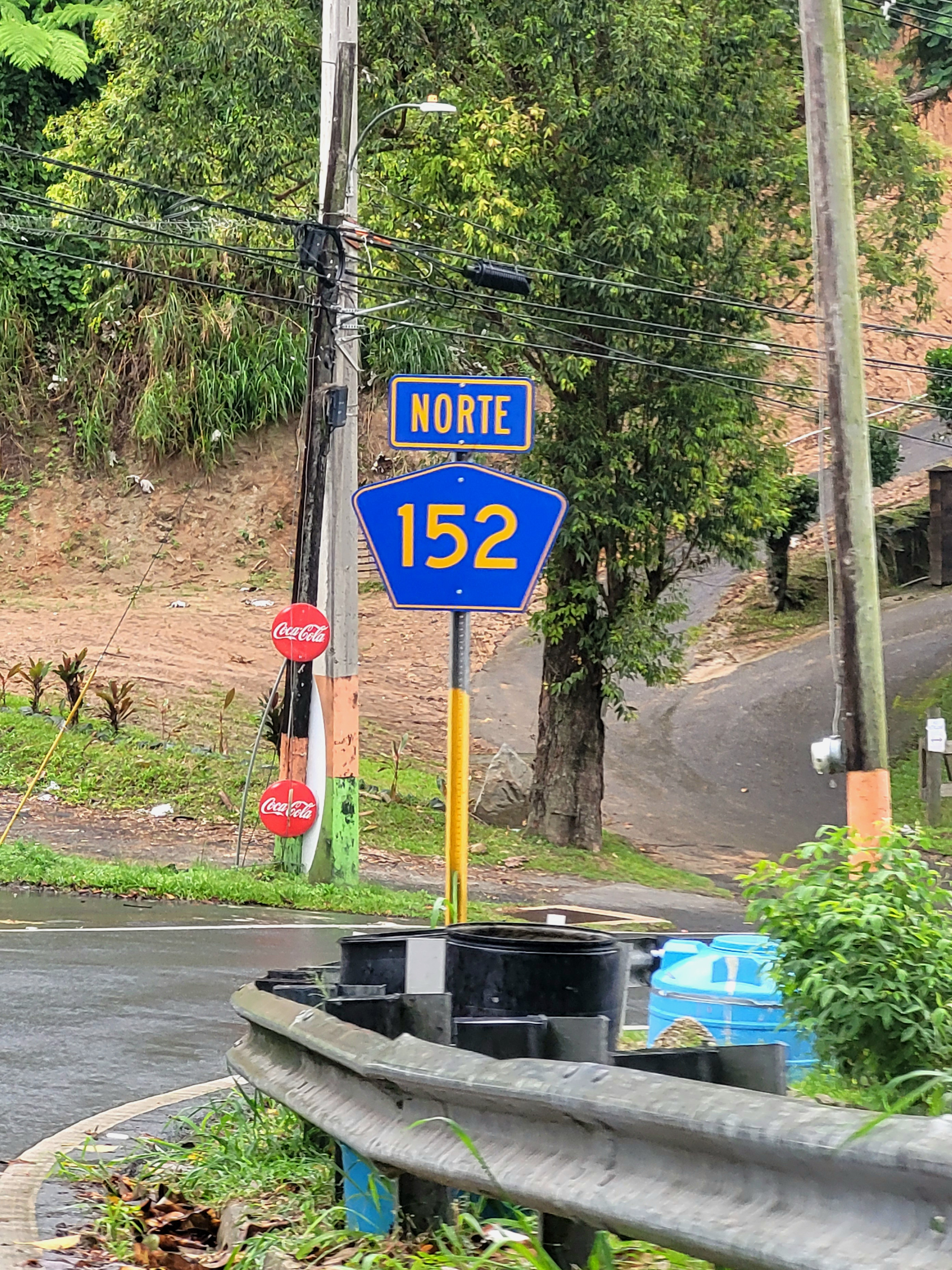
Northbound sign in Cedro Abajo, Naranjito

=== Locations served ===
The following are the municipalities, barrios and landmarks through which PR-152 passes from south to north:

Municipality	Barrios	Landmarks
Barranquitas	Barranquitas barrio-pueblo, Quebradillas, Quebrada Grande	Caliente River
Naranjito	Cedro Arriba, Cedro Abajo, Anones, Achiote, Naranjito barrio-pueblo	Naranjito Shopping Village, Mavilla River, El Mercado Plaza, Guadiana River, Mirador Las Lágrimas

=== Gastronomic route ===
From June 2019, PR-152 is the Gastronomic route of Naranjito (Ruta Gastronómica de Naranjito), for having a large variety of restaurants and businesses along its route for chinchorreo—a term that loosely translates to "bar hopping". Chinchorreo is when people go from place to place along a route, stopping in for a bite to eat or a drink and these "gastronomic routes" have been established around the island of Puerto Rico to stimulate local tourism.

== Major intersections ==
PR-156 east at the southern terminus of PR-152 in Barranquitas

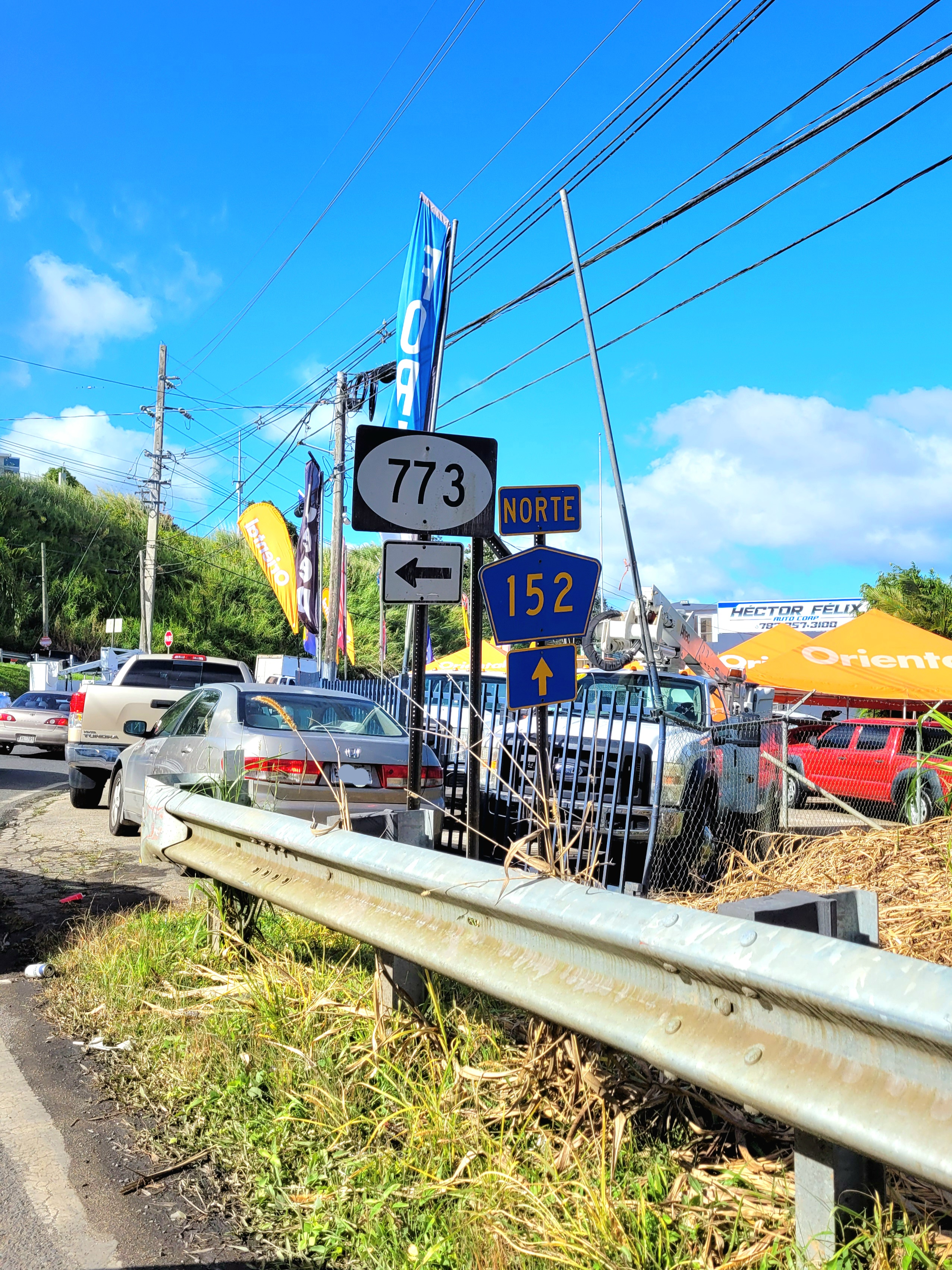
PR-152 north at PR-773 intersection in Quebradillas, Barranquitas

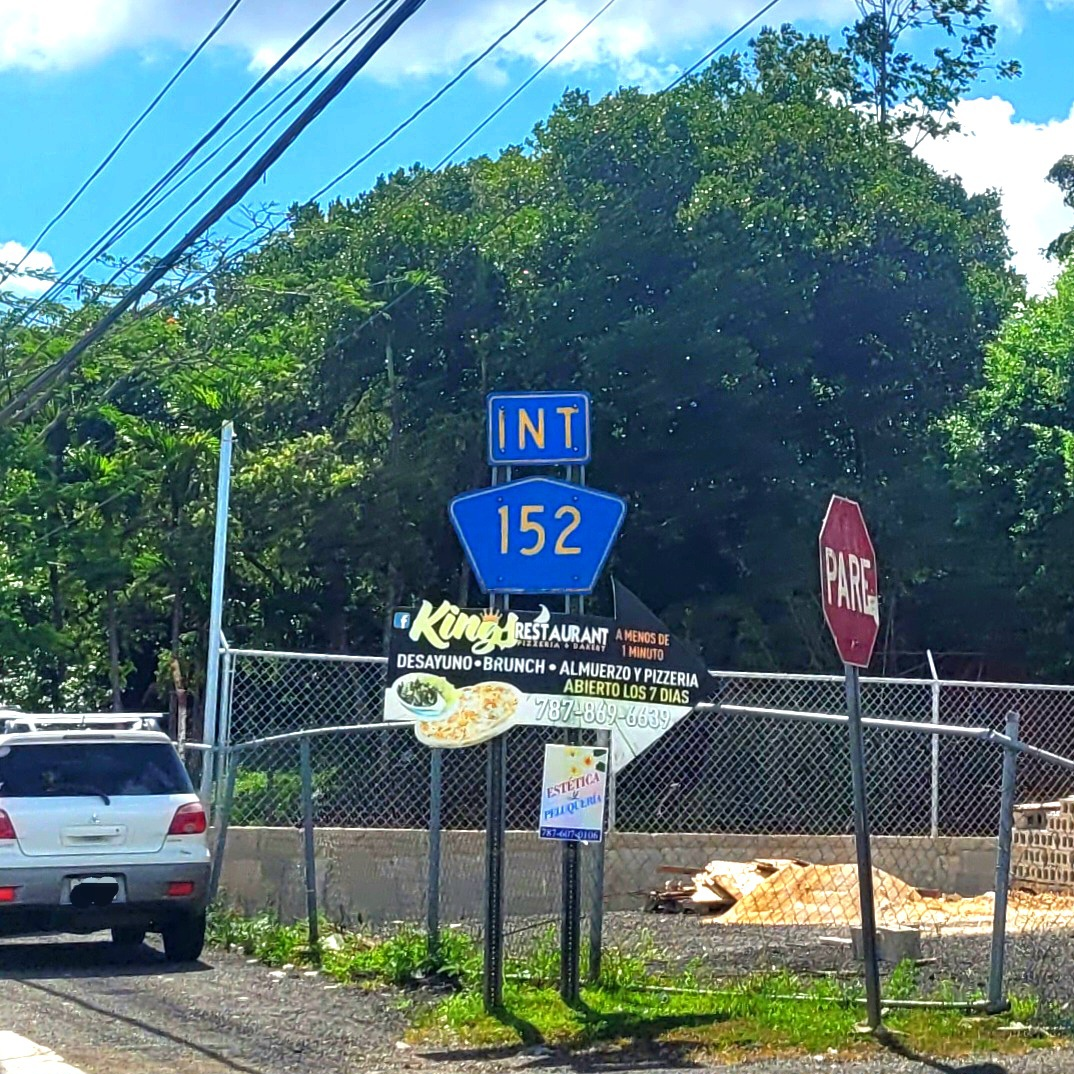
PR-779 west approaching PR-152 junction in Cedro Arriba, Naranjito

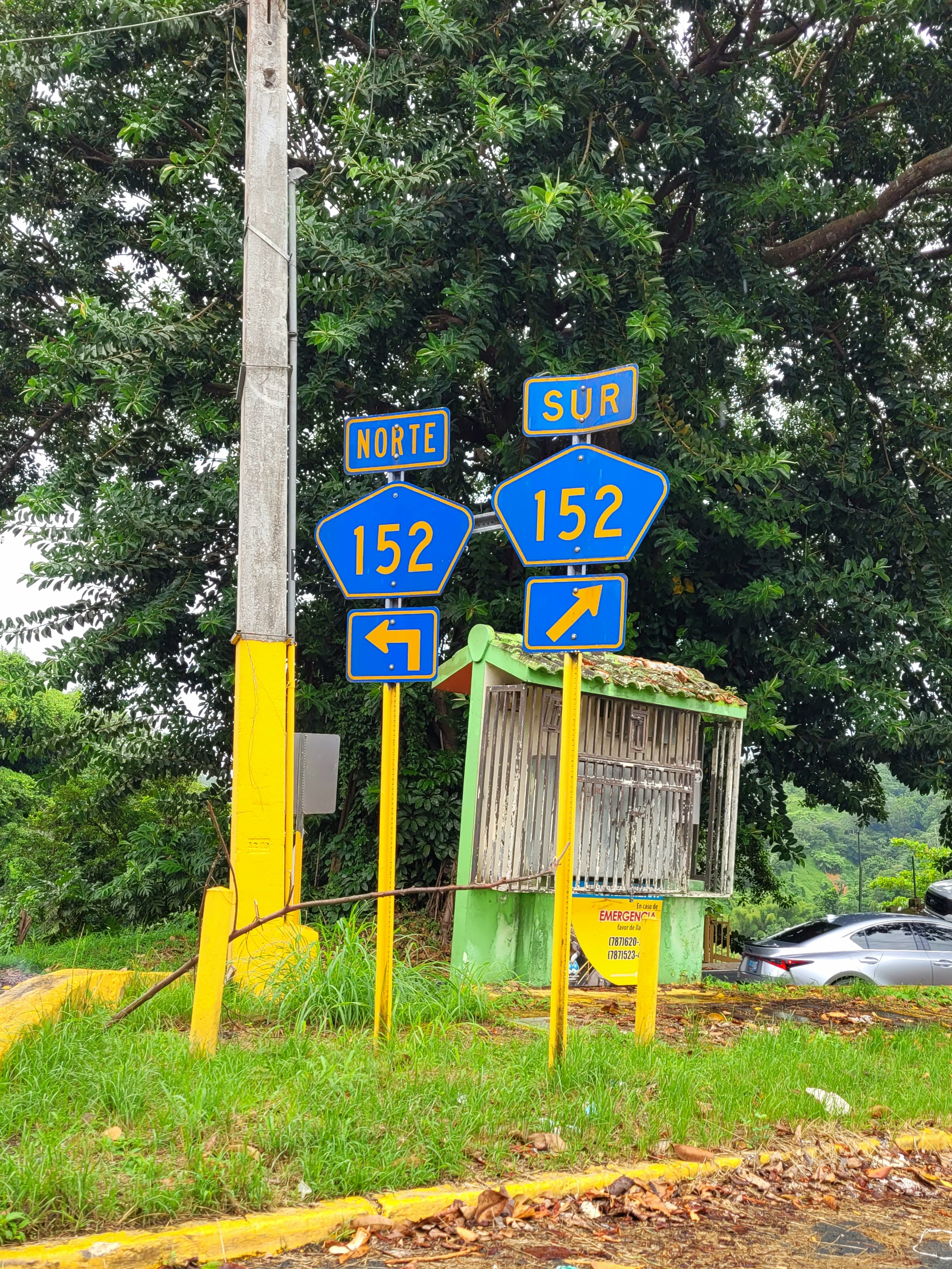
PR-152 at the southern terminus of PR-811 in Cedro Abajo, Naranjito

Municipality	Location	km	mi	Destinations	Notes
Barranquitas	Barranquitas barrio-pueblo–Quebradillas line	0.0	0.0	PR-156 (Calle Antonio R. Barceló) – Comerío, Orocovis	Southern terminus of PR-152
Barranquitas	Quebradillas	0.6	0.37	PR-152R south (Avenida Ingeniero José Zayas Green) – Orocovis	
Barranquitas	Quebradillas	4.5	2.8	PR-749 – Quebrada Grande	
Barranquitas	Quebradillas	7.2	4.5	PR-773 – Barrancas	
Barranquitas	Quebradillas	7.5	4.7	PR-7773 – Quebradillas	
Naranjito	Cedro Arriba	9.9	6.2	PR-779 east – Comerío	
Naranjito	Cedro Arriba	12.3	7.6	PR-802 / PR-803 – Corozal, Orocovis	
Naranjito	Cedro Arriba	14.5	9.0	PR-809 – Cedro Arriba	
Naranjito	Cedro Abajo	15.9	9.9	PR-811 – Cedro Abajo	
Naranjito	Cedro Abajo	17.1	10.6	PR-810 – Higuillales	
Naranjito	Cedro Abajo	17.6	10.9	PR-814 – Anones	
Naranjito	Achiote–Naranjito barrio-pueblo line	20.3	12.6	PR-164 west – Corozal	Northern terminus of PR-152 and southern terminus of PR-5
Naranjito	Achiote–Naranjito barrio-pueblo line	20.3	12.6	PR-5 north (Desvío Mariano Cotto) – Naranjito, Bayamón, Comerío	Continuation beyond PR-164; PR-164 east access via PR-5 north
1.000 mi = 1.609 km; 1.000 km = 0.621 mi

== Related route ==
Highway 152R
- Location: Barranquitas
- Length: 3.2 km (2.0 mi)

Puerto Rico Highway 152R (Spanish: Carretera Ramal 152, abbreviated Ramal PR-152 or PR-152R) is a bypass road that branches off from PR-152 and ends at PR-143 in Helechal. It is officially designated as Avenida Ingeniero José Zayas Green. The entire route is located in Barranquitas.

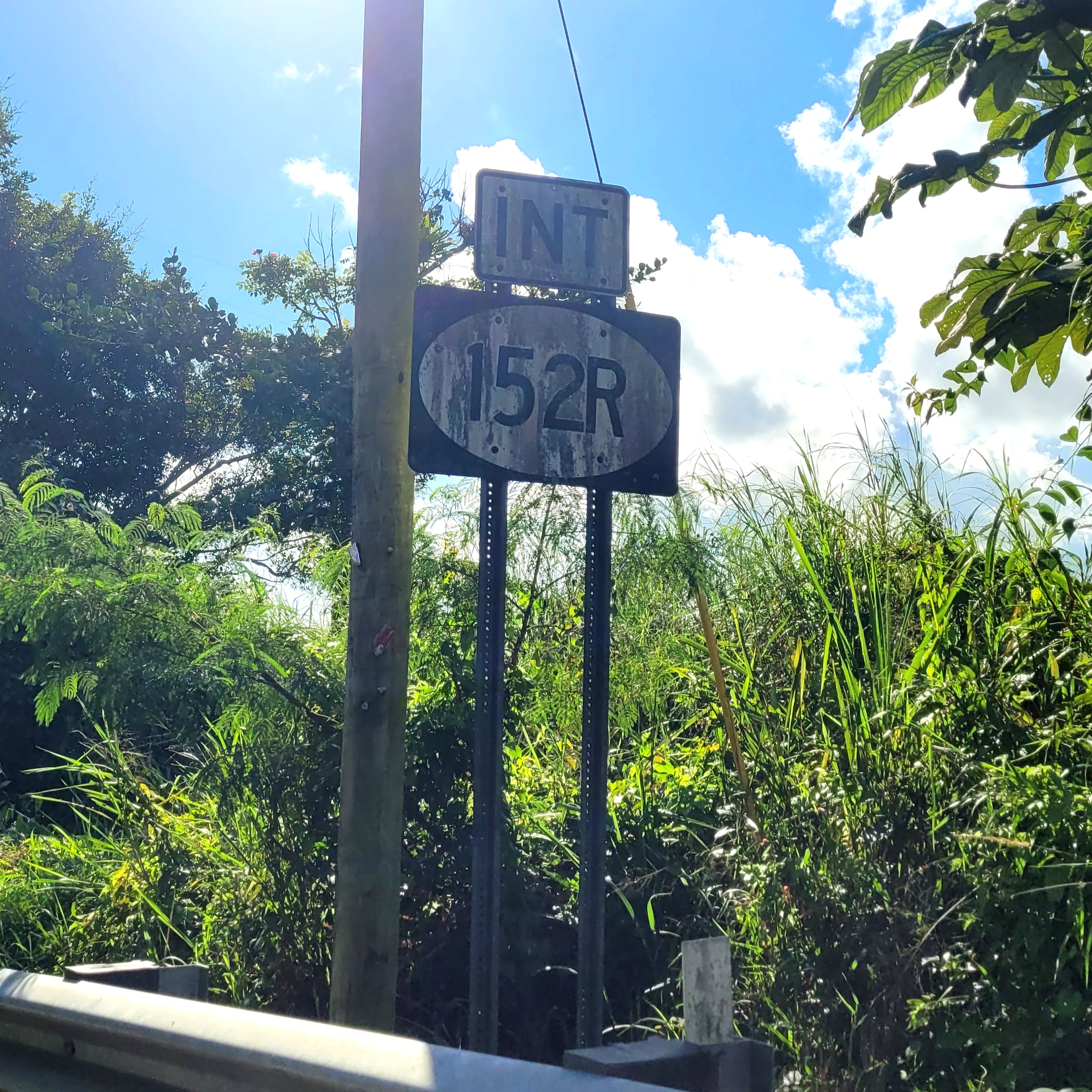
PR-152 south approaching PR-152R intersection in Quebradillas barrio

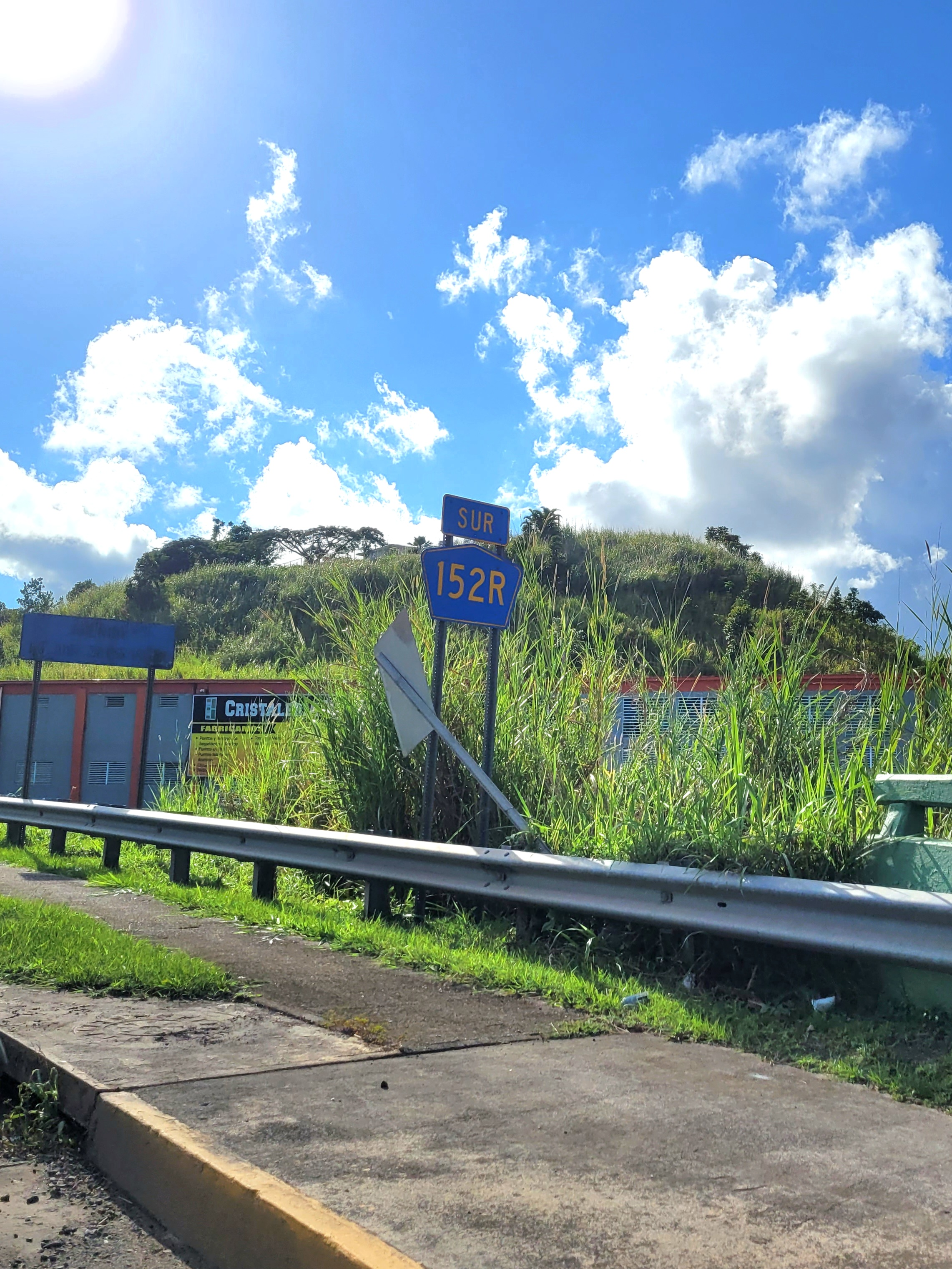
PR-152R south in Barranquitas barrio-pueblo

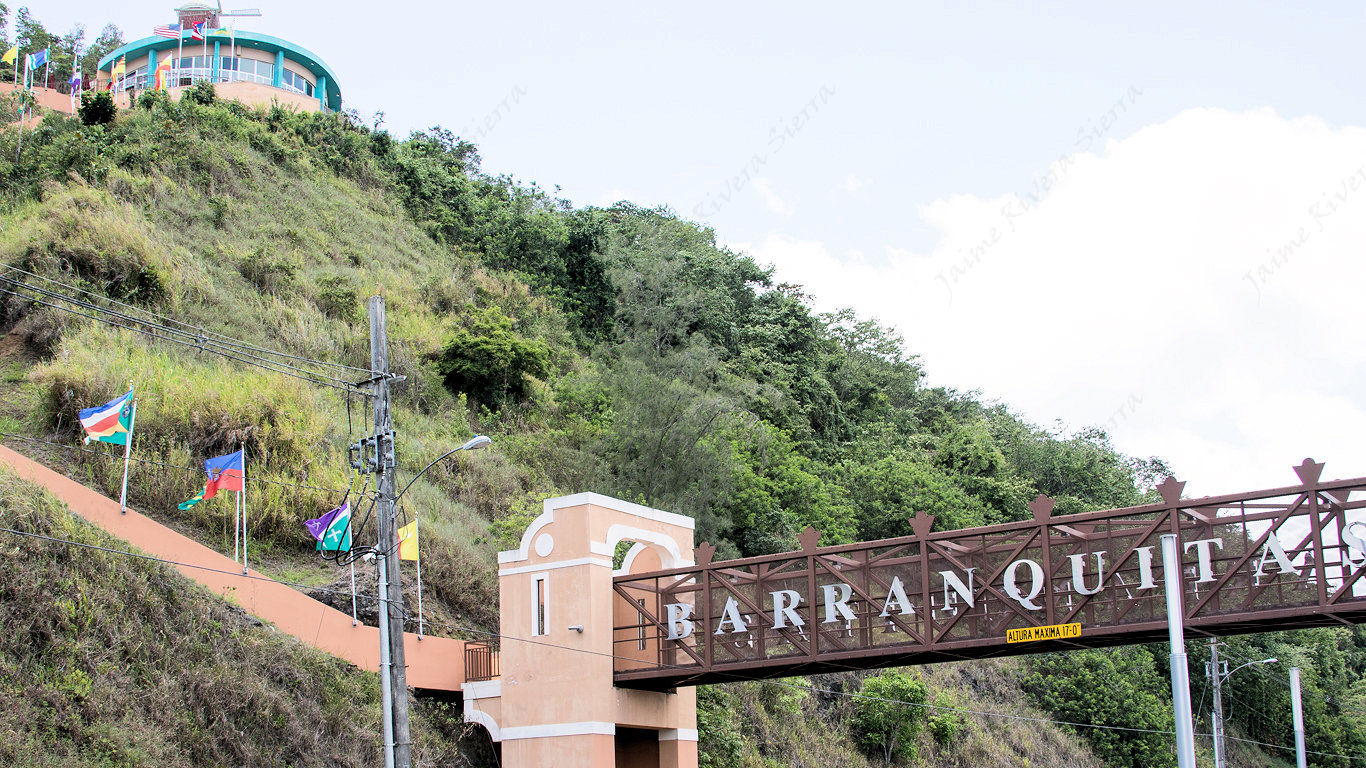
View of Paseo Lineal and Tourism Mirador de Barranquitas from PR-152R

Location	km	mi	Destinations	Notes
Helechal	3.2	2.0	PR-143 – Adjuntas, Aibonito	Southern terminus of PR-152R
Barranquitas barrio-pueblo	1.5	0.93	PR-156 – Barranquitas, Orocovis	
Barranquitas barrio-pueblo	1.4	0.87	PR-771 (Carretera Barrancas) – Barrancas	
Quebradillas	0.0	0.0	PR-152 – Barranquitas, Naranjito	Northern terminus of PR-152R
1.000 mi = 1.609 km; 1.000 km = 0.621 mi

== See also ==
- 1953 Puerto Rico highway renumbering
