= Puerto Rico Highway 810 =

Highway in Puerto Rico

Highway 810
- Ruta 810

Route information
- Maintained by Puerto Rico DTPW
- Length: 3.7 km (2.3 mi)

Major junctions
- South end: PR-152 in Cedro Abajo
- PR-814 in Cedro Abajo
- North end: PR-164 in Achiote–Naranjito barrio-pueblo

Location
- Country: United States
- Territory: Puerto Rico
- Municipalities: Naranjito

Highway system
- Roads in Puerto Rico; List
| ← PR-807 | → PR-818 |

Puerto Rico Highway 810 (PR-810) is a north–south road located entirely in the municipality of Naranjito in Puerto Rico. With a length of 3.7 kilometers (2.3 mi), it begins at its intersection with PR-164 on the downtown Naranjito–Achiote line, and ends at its junction with PR-152 in Cedro Abajo barrio.

== Route description ==
Due to its rural characteristics, PR-810 consists of one lane per direction for its entire length. It begins at PR-164 junction near downtown Naranjito and continues to the south through southwestern Achiote barrio, near to the western bank of the Río Guadiana. After Achiote, the highway enters in eastern Cedro Abajo barrio, where meets with PR-814, a road that leads to Anones barrio. Then, PR-810 continues within Cedro Abajo until its southern terminus at PR-152 junction.

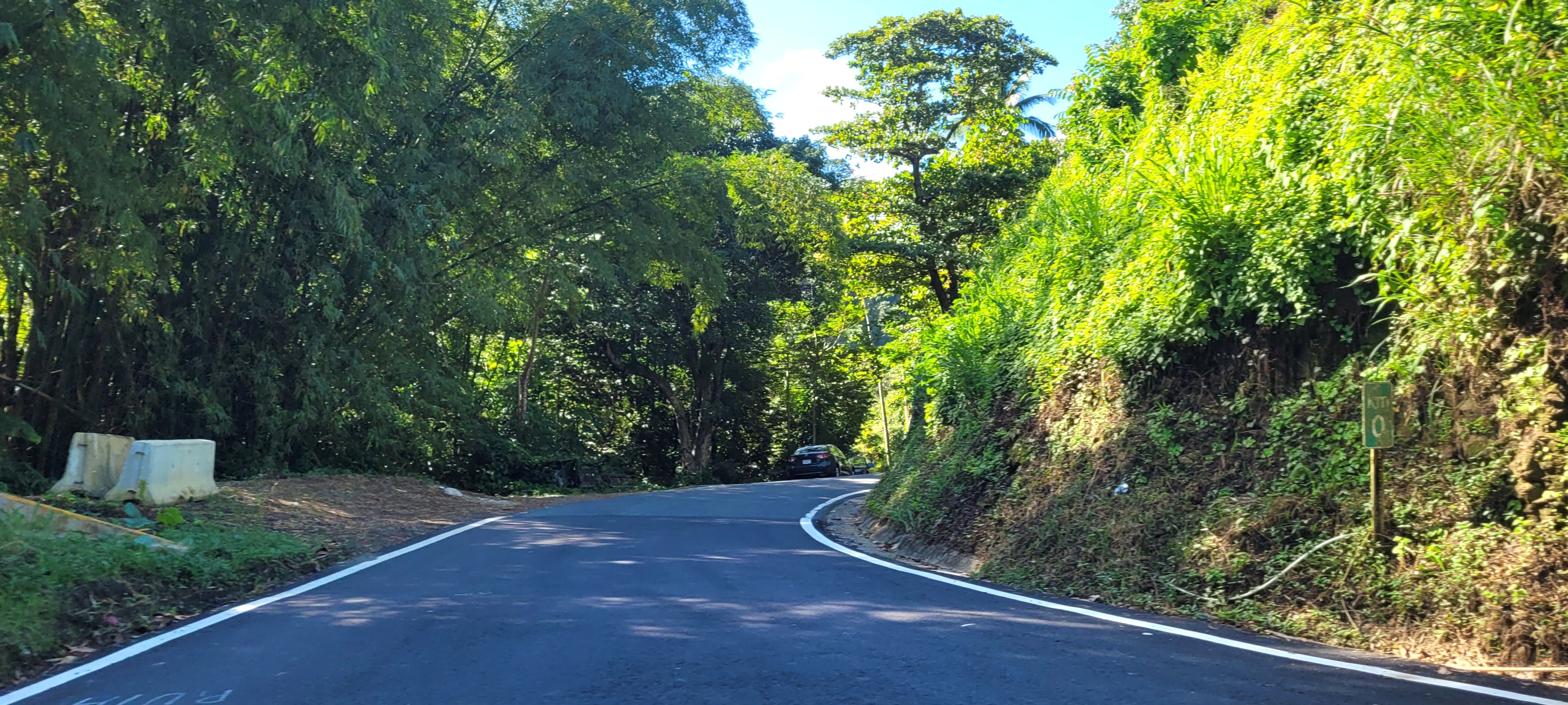
Southbound beginning of PR-810 in Achiote, leaving PR-164 junction

== History ==
Before its current numerical designation, the entire length of PR-810 belonged to an original segment of PR-152 prior to its deviation along the eastern bank of the Guadiana River though Anones. Those numerical designations correspond to the 1953 Puerto Rico highway renumbering, a process implemented by the Puerto Rico Department of Transportation and Public Works (Spanish: Departamento de Transportación y Obras Públicas) that increased the insular highway network to connect existing routes with different locations around Puerto Rico. PR-810 is also known as Carretera de Higuillales.

== Major intersections ==
The entire route is located in Naranjito.

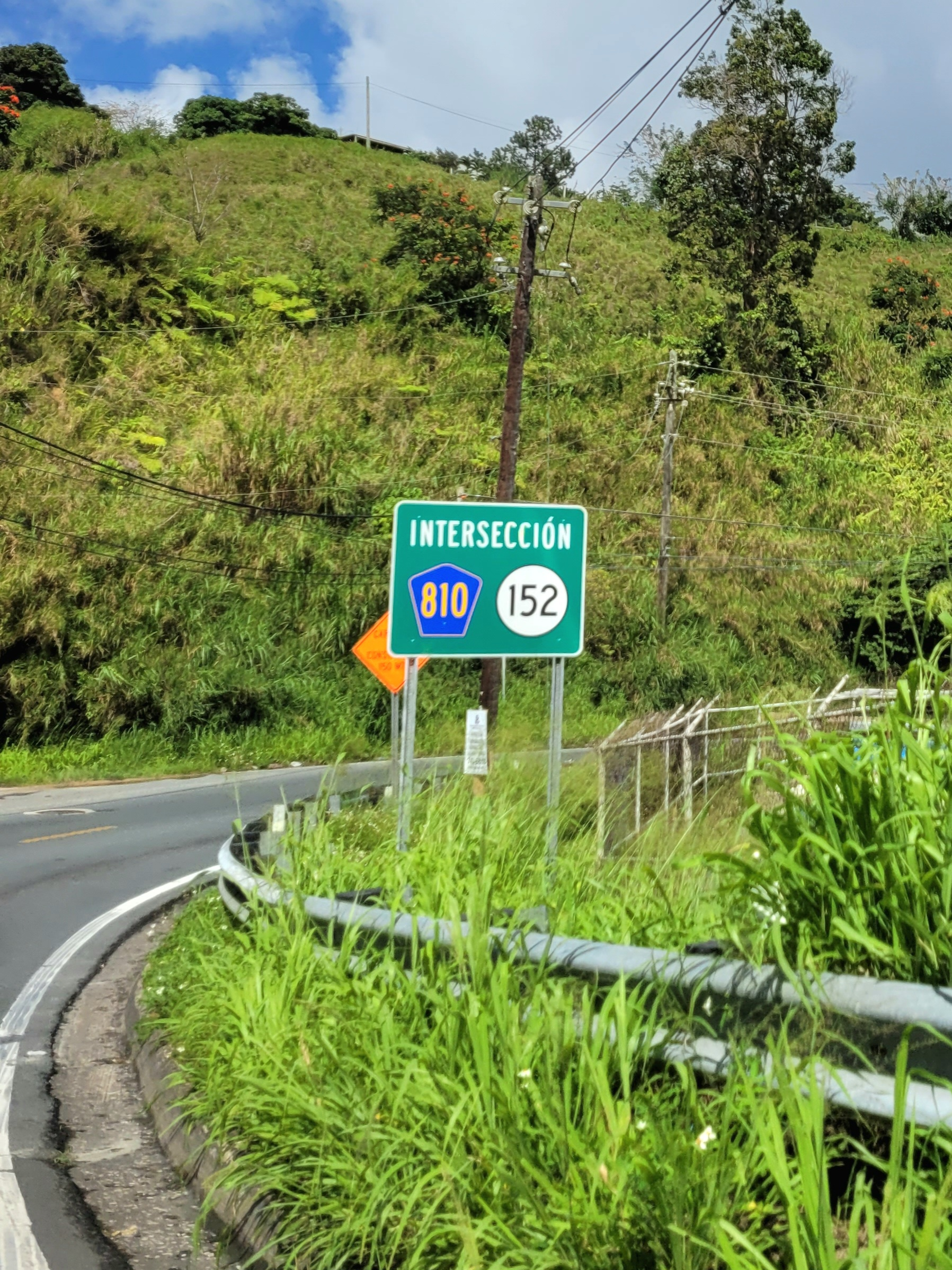
PR-152 north near the southern terminus of PR-810 in Cedro Abajo barrio

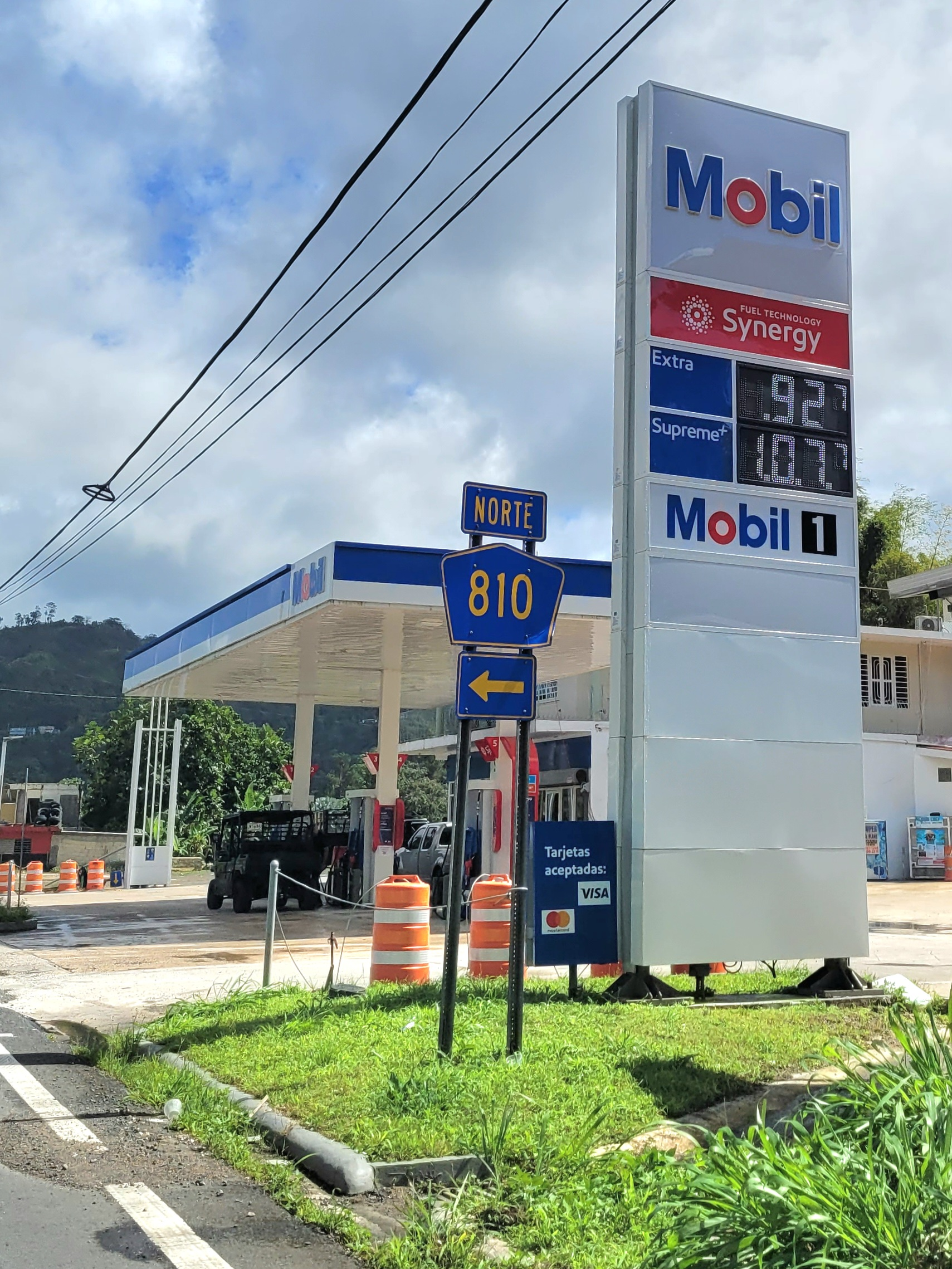
PR-152 north at PR-810 intersection in Cedro Abajo barrio

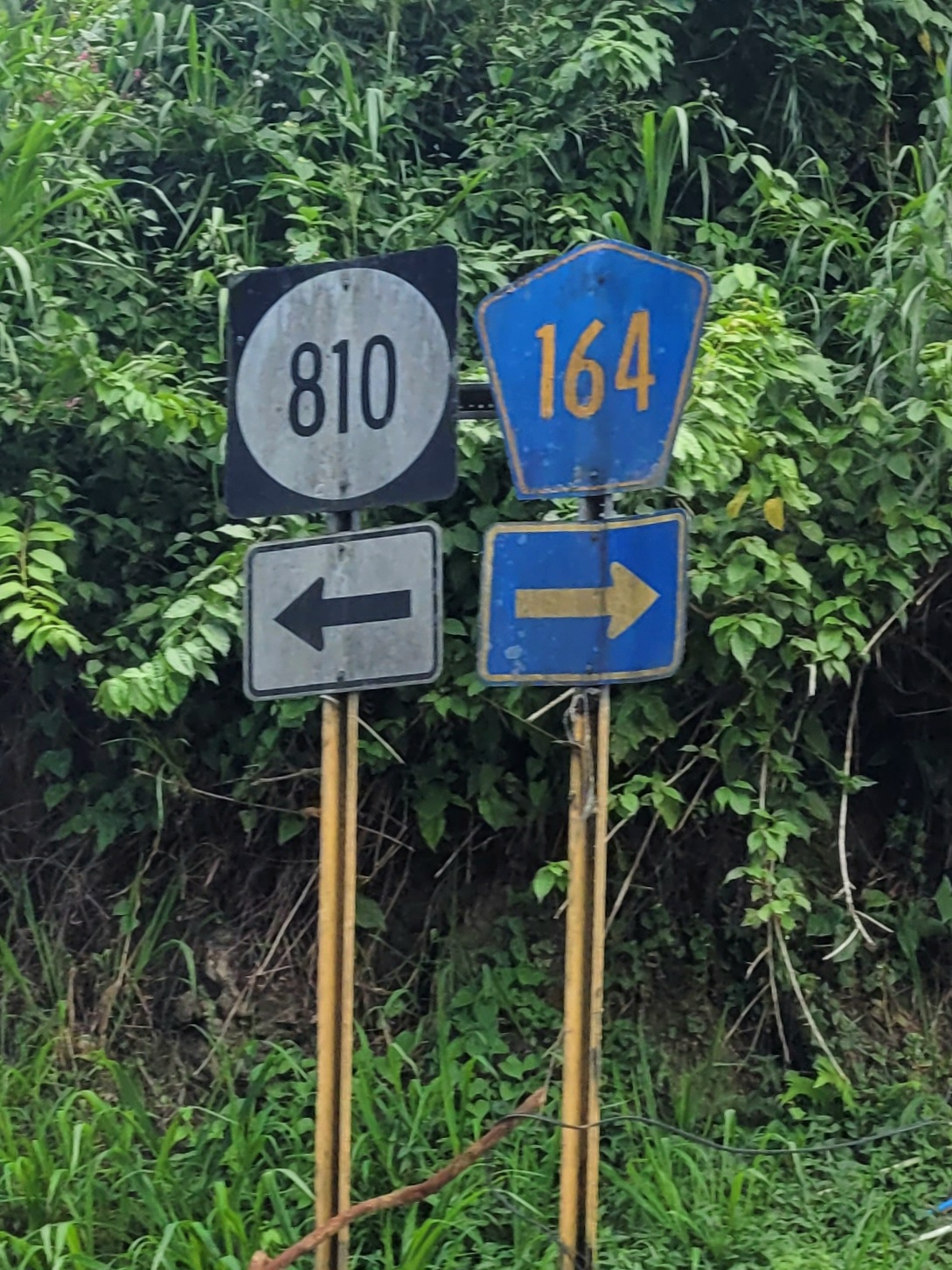
PR-164 west at the northern terminus of PR-810

| Location | km | mi | Destinations | Notes |
|---|---|---|---|---|
| Cedro Abajo | 3.7 | 2.3 | PR-152 – Naranjito, Barranquitas | Southern terminus of PR-810 |
| Cedro Abajo | 2.4 | 1.5 | PR-814 – Anones | |
| Achiote–Naranjito barrio-pueblo line | 0.0 | 0.0 | PR-164 – Naranjito, Corozal | Northern terminus of PR-810 |
1.000 mi = 1.609 km; 1.000 km = 0.621 mi
