= List of barrios and sectors of Naranjito, Puerto Rico =

Like all municipalities of Puerto Rico, Naranjito is subdivided into administrative units called barrios, which are, in contemporary times, roughly comparable to minor civil divisions, (and means wards or boroughs or neighborhoods in English). The barrios and subbarrios, in turn, are further subdivided into smaller local populated place areas/units called sectores (sectors in English). The types of sectores may vary, from normally sector to urbanización to reparto to barriada to residencial, among others. Some sectors appear in two barrios.

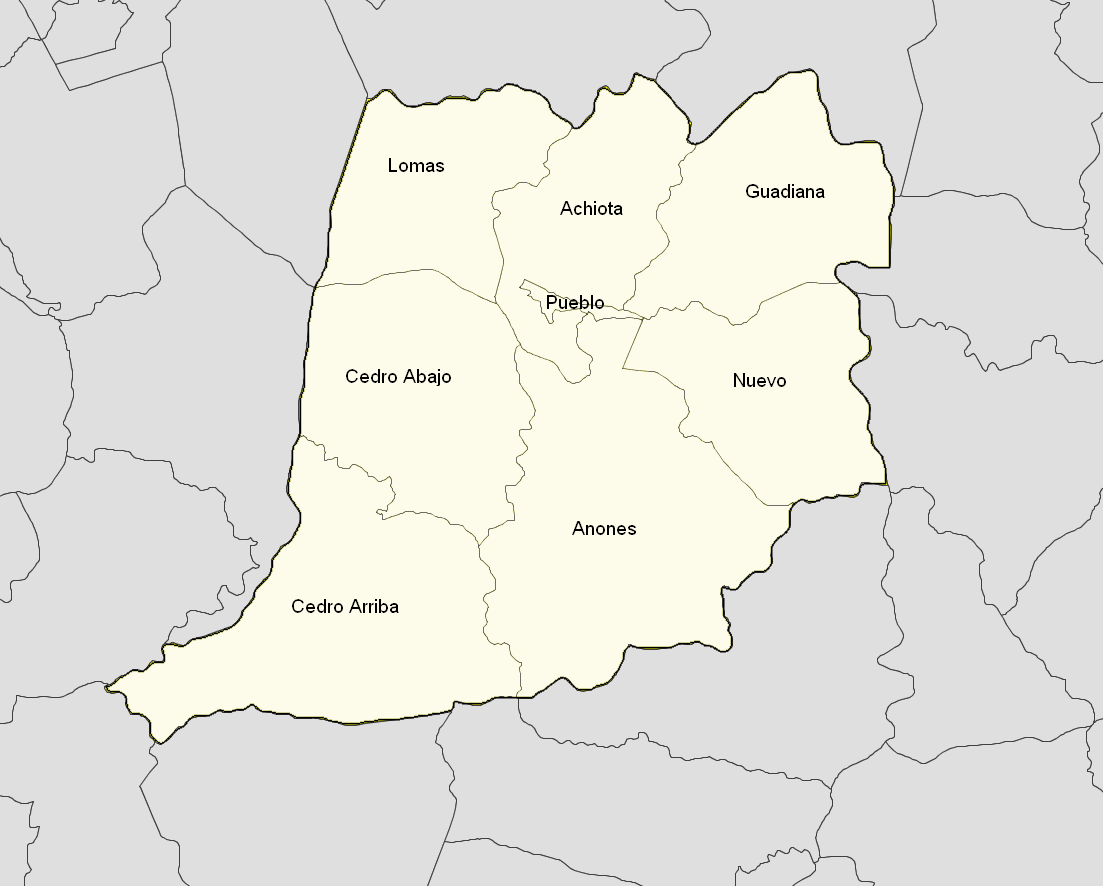
Naranjito map with barrio subdivisions

== List of sectors by barrio ==
=== Achiote ===
- Achiote Centro
- Barriada La Aldea
- Barriada La Colina
- Camino Chago Vázquez
- Camino Chilo Padilla
- Comunidad Blas Vázquez
- Comunidad Los Báez
- Comunidad Neco Ortega
- Comunidad Oscar Padilla
- Comunidad Telésforo Torres
- El Cuco
- Fondo del Saco
- Higuillales
- La Galvana
- Los Café
- Los Nieves
- Maravilla (Chícharo)
- Residencial Candelario Torres
- Sector Achiote Adentro
- Sector Desvío
- Sector El Cementerio
- Sector El Llano
- Sector El Peñón
- Sector Felipe Velásquez
- Sector La Cantera
- Sector La Cuesta de Cundo
- Sector La Loma
- Sector La Palma
- Sector Los Chévere
- Sector Monchito Martínez
- Sector Tanita Morales
- Sector Toñito Padilla
- Urbanización Jardines de Naranjito

=== Anones ===
- Anones Díaz
- Anones Don Tito
- Carretera 152
- Camino Manolín González
- Comunidad Las Lágrimas
- Comunidad Rogelio Ferrer
- La Maya
- La Sierra
- Los Matos
- Sector Álvaro Rodríguez
- Sector Beltrán
- Sector Cátala
- Sector Cayito Ríos
- Sector Cuatro Puertas
- Sector El Cerro
- Sector El Palmar
- Sector El Pollito
- Sector Flor Maure
- Sector Fuentes
- Sector Hernández
- Sector Juan Sostre Coreano
- Sector Los Vasallos
- Sector Marcano
- Sector Merce Alicea
- Sector Mirador
- Sector Molina
- Sector Palin Cátala
- Sector Pablo Cátala
- Sector Punto Fijo
- Rodríguez
- Tito Cátala
- Villa Polilla

=== Cedro Abajo ===
- Camino Roberto Rodríguez
- Camino Toño Nieves
- Comunidad Belén
- El Hoyo
- Higuillales
- Lalo López
- Sector Berríos
- Sector Cuatro Calles
- Sector El Bronco
- Sector Felipa Sánchez
- Sector Juan Cosme
- Sector Juan López
- Sector La Cantera
- Sector La Telefónica
- Sector Las Cumbres
- Sector Los Bistec
- Sector Los Pagán
- Sector Los Pelusa
- Sector Mero Morales
- Sector Pepe Morales
- Sector Pepito Berríos
- Sector Sabana

=== Cedro Arriba ===
- El Abanico
- Sector Ángel Avilés
- Sector Cabrera
- Sector El Banco
- Sector El Pueblito
- Sector El Riíto
- Sector Feijoó Anones
- Sector Feijoó Cedro Arriba
- Sector Ferrer
- Sector La Gallera
- Sector La Pajona
- Sector Las Cruces
- Sector Loncho López
- Sector Los López
- Sector Los Morales
- Sector Los Pomos
- Sector Los Ríos
- Sector Los Zayas
- Sector Maná
- Sector Moncho Rodríguez
- Sector Peñabert
- Sector San Antonio
- Sector Sánchez
- Sector Santa Rita
- Sector Tiñín Ortega
- Sector Xanadú

=== Guadiana ===
- Camino Lico Cruz
- Camino Moncho Pagán
- Camino Pascual Rivera
- Comunidad Lago La Plata
- El Cuco
- Guadiana Alto
- La Hueca
- Sector Alejandro (Entrada a Guadiana)
- Sector Anselmo Cabrera
- Sector Cabrera
- Sector Colón
- Sector Cuesta Las Abejas
- Sector Guadiana Chinea
- Sector Guadiana Espinell
- Sector Guadiana Ortega
- Sector Hatito
- Sector La Gallera
- Sector Lago Verde
- Sector Los Juanes
- Sector Negrón
- Sector Otero
- Sector Parcelas

=== Lomas ===
- Lomas Jaguas
- Parcelas Las Riveras (Lomas García)
- Sector Arturo Morales
- Sector Cleto
- Sector Cuchillas
- Sector Cuchillas Pacheco
- Sector El Cielito
- Sector Flor Rivera
- Sector García
- Sector Guayabo
- Sector La Jagua
- Sector La Rueda
- Sector Loma Linda
- Sector Lomas Centro
- Sector Lomas Vallés
- Sector Matos
- Sector Quiles
- Sector Rafael Padilla
- Sector Sico Martínez (Los Pampers)
- Sector Susín Vázquez
- Sector Tacho Vázquez
- Sector Tavo Vázquez (Chárriez)

=== Naranjito barrio-pueblo ===
- Barriada La Marina
- Barriada Monte Verde
- Barriada San Antonio
- Barriada San Cristóbal
- Barriada San Miguel
- Calle Georgetti
- Calle Ignacio Morales Acosta
- Calle Pedro Cid
- Calle Víctor J. Mojica
- Sector Acueducto

=== Nuevo ===
- Camino Don Manolo
- Camino González Mathews
- Camino Los Matos
- Eusebio Rivera
- Parcelas Hevia
- Sector Aponte
- Sector Bernard
- Sector Bunker Hills
- Sector Cabrera
- Sector Cintrón
- Sector Cuadrado
- Sector Doña Bacha
- Sector Entrada Guadiana
- Sector Febus
- Sector Hevia
- Sector Hogar Crea
- Sector La Tosca
- Sector Loma del Viento
- Sector Martínez
- Sector Matadero
- Sector Mulitas
- Sector Negrón
- Sector Ortega
- Sector Puente Plata
- Sector Santa María (formerly Villa Embrolla)
- Sector Siete Curvas
- Sector Sostre
- Urbanización Campo Bello
- Urbanización Valle Verde
- Villa del Plata

== See also ==
- List of communities in Puerto Rico
