= Quebrada Grande, Barranquitas, Puerto Rico =

Barrio of Puerto Rico

Quebrada Grande
- Barrio
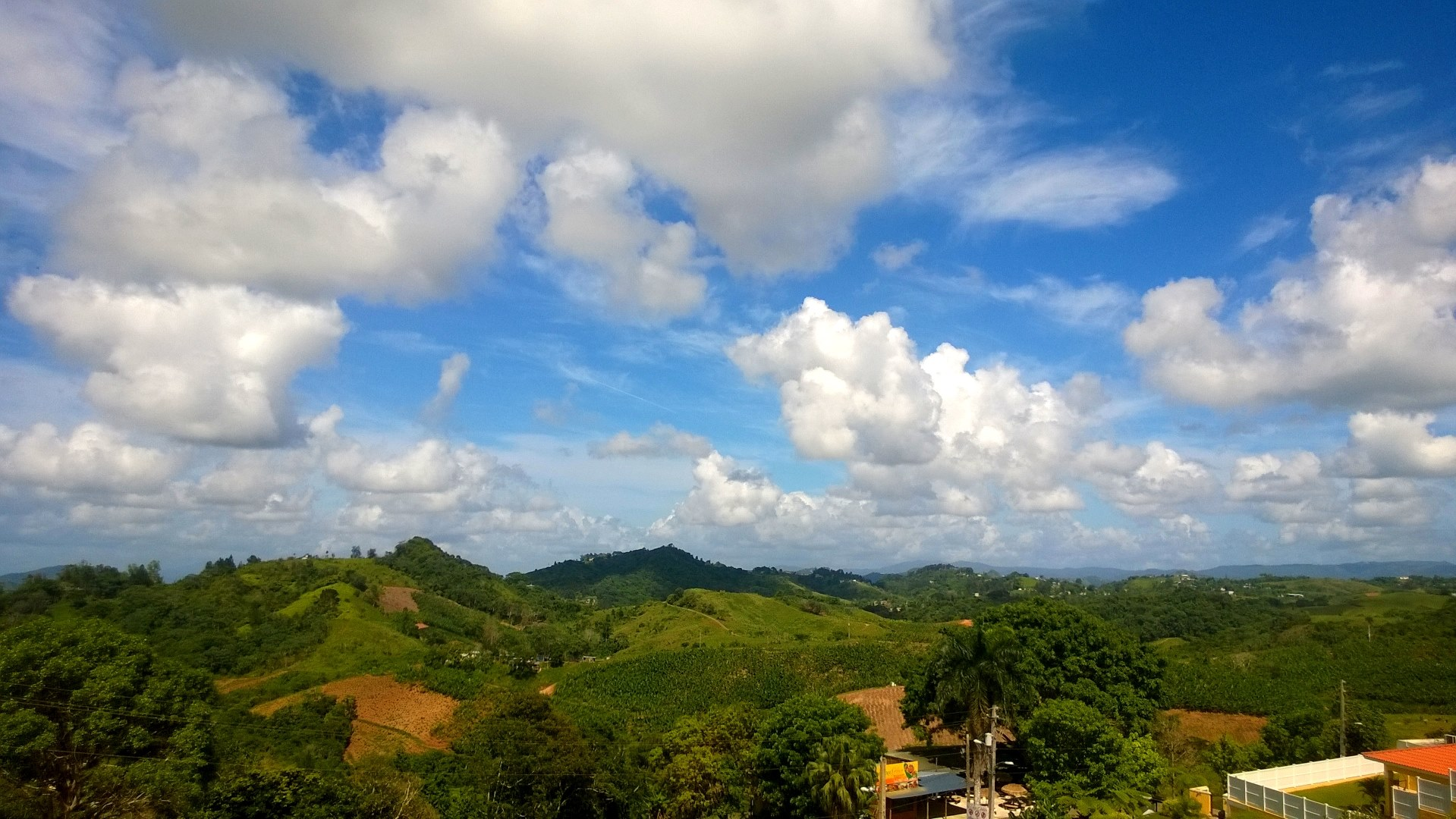
- Mountains in Quebrada Grande

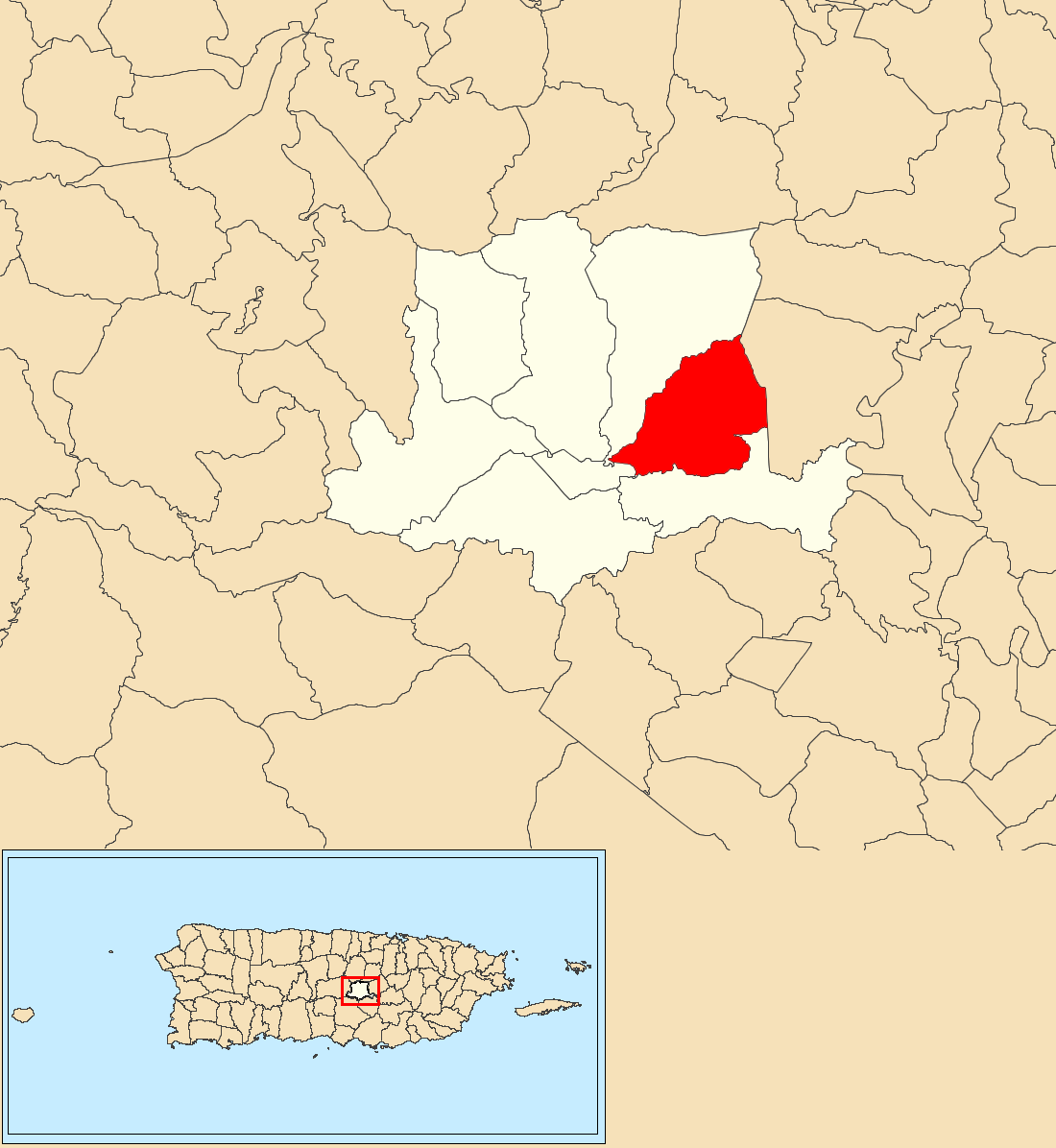
- Location of Quebrada Grande within the municipality of Barranquitas shown in red

- Location of Puerto Rico
- Coordinates: 18°11′56″N 66°16′50″W
- Commonwealth: Puerto Rico
- Municipality: Barranquitas

Area
  - Total: 3.65 sq mi (9.5 km^{2})
  - Land: 3.65 sq mi (9.5 km^{2})
  - Water: 0.00 sq mi (0 km^{2})
- Elevation: 1,972 ft (601 m)

Population (2010)
  - Total: 3,217
  - Density: 338.1/sq mi (130.5/km^{2})
- Source: 2010 Census
- Time zone: UTC−4 (AST)
- ZIP Code: 00794
- Area code: 787/939

Quebrada Grande is a barrio in the municipality of Barranquitas, Puerto Rico. Its population in 2010 was 3,217.

== History ==
Quebrada Grande was in Spain's gazetteers until Puerto Rico was ceded by Spain in the aftermath of the Spanish–American War under the terms of the Treaty of Paris of 1898 and became an unincorporated territory of the United States. In 1899, the United States Department of War conducted a census of Puerto Rico finding that the population of Quebrada Grande barrio was 931.

Historical population
Census	Pop.	Note	%±
1900	931		—
1910	1,356		45.6%
1920	1,441		6.3%
1930	1,633		13.3%
1940	1,795		9.9%
1950	1,585		−11.7%
1960	1,895		19.6%
1970	2,397		26.5%
1980	2,413		0.7%
1990	2,608		8.1%
2000	3,194		22.5%
2010	3,217		0.7%
U.S. Decennial Census; 1899 (shown as 1900) 1910-1930; 1930-1950 1980-2000 2010

== Special community ==
Since 2001 when law 1-2001 was passed, measures have been taken to identify and address the high levels of poverty and the lack of resources and opportunities affecting specific communities in Puerto Rico. Initially there were 686 places that made the list. By 2008, there were 742 places on the list of Comunidades especiales de Puerto Rico. The places on the list are barrios, communities, sectors, or neighborhoods and in 2004, Quebrada Grande made the list. In 2017, the director of the Special Communities of Puerto Rico program stated that the program was evolving with more ways to help the residents of these marginalized communities.

== Gallery ==
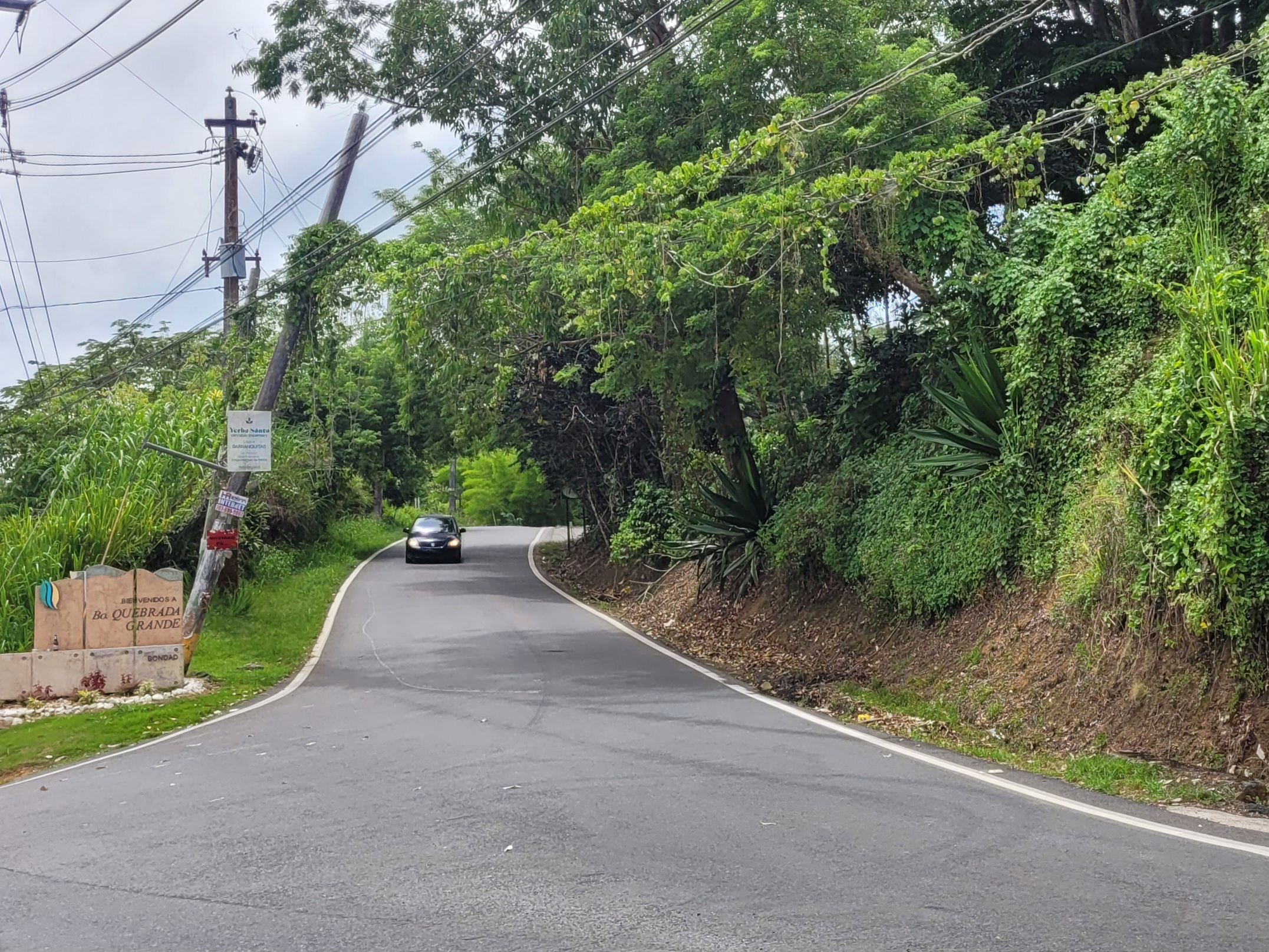
Puerto Rico Highway 749 heading to Quebrada Grande from Quebradillas

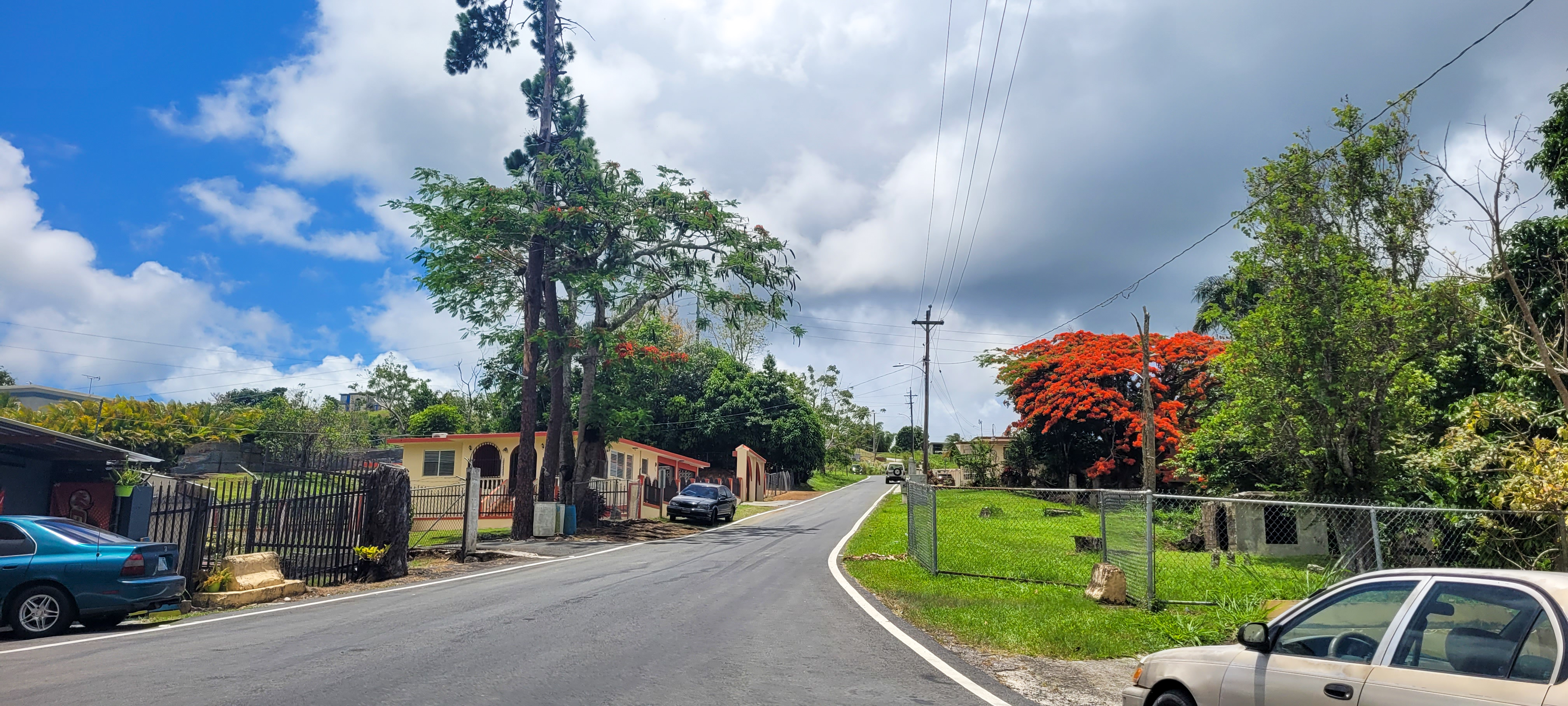
Puerto Rico Highway 749 in Quebrada Grande

== See also ==
- List of communities in Puerto Rico
