= Barranquitas barrio-pueblo =

Historical and administrative center (seat) of Barranquitas, Puerto Rico

Barranquitas barrio-pueblo Pueblo de Barranquitas
- Municipality Seat
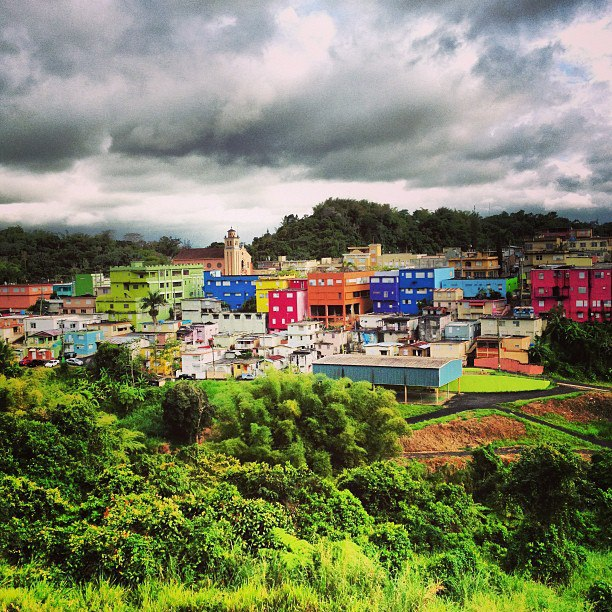
- View of Barranquitas Pueblo from PR-152. (2013)

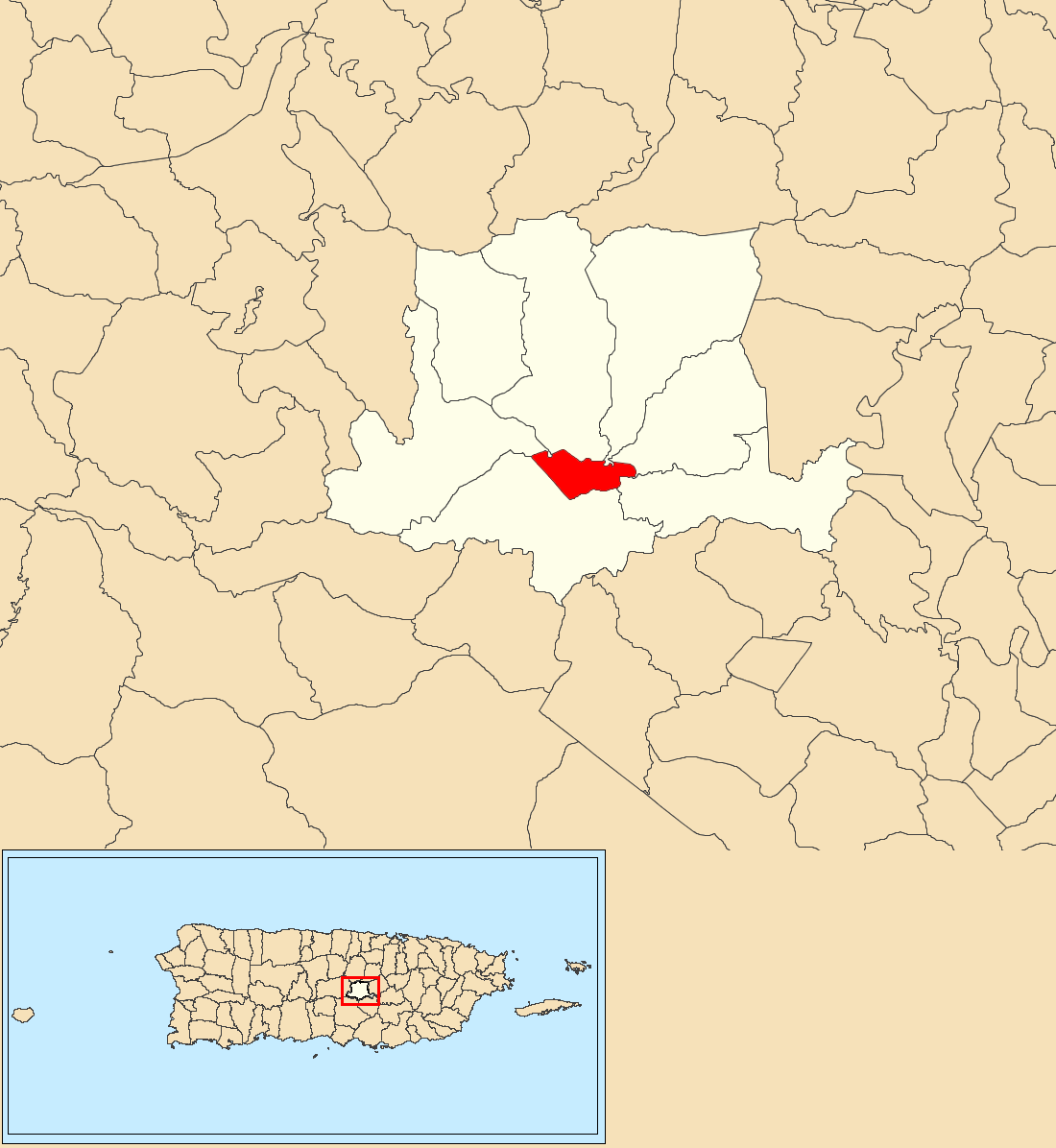
- Location of Barranquitas barrio-pueblo within the municipality of Barranquitas shown in red

- Location of Puerto Rico
- Coordinates: 18°11′05″N 66°18′37″W
- Commonwealth: Puerto Rico
- Municipality: Barranquitas

Area
  - Total: 0.77 sq mi (2.0 km^{2})
  - Land: 0.77 sq mi (2.0 km^{2})
  - Water: 0.00 sq mi (0 km^{2})
- Elevation: 2,129 ft (649 m)

Population (2010)
  - Total: 2,695
  - Density: 1,507.8/sq mi (582.2/km^{2})
- Source: 2010 Census
- Time zone: UTC−4 (AST)
- ZIP Code: 00794
- Area code: 787/939

Barranquitas barrio-pueblo is a barrio and the administrative center (seat) of Barranquitas, a municipality of Puerto Rico. Its population in 2010 was 2,695.

As was customary in Spain, in Puerto Rico, the municipality has a barrio called pueblo which contains a central plaza, the municipal buildings (city hall), and a Catholic church. Fiestas patronales (patron saint festivals) are held in the central plaza every year.

== The central plaza and its church ==
The central plaza, or square, is a place for official and unofficial recreational events and a place where people can gather and socialize from dusk to dawn. The Laws of the Indies, Spanish law, which regulated life in Puerto Rico in the early 19th century, stated the plaza's purpose was for "the parties" (celebrations, festivities) (Spanish: a propósito para las fiestas), and that the square should be proportionally large enough for the number of neighbors (Spanish: grandeza proporcionada al número de vecinos). These Spanish regulations also stated that the streets nearby should be comfortable portals for passersby, protecting them from the elements: sun and rain. The name of the Barranquitas central plaza is Plaza de recreo Monseñor Miguel Mendoza.

Located across from the central plaza in Barranquitas barrio-pueblo is the Parroquia San Antonio de Padua (Anthony of Padua Parish). In 1792, there was a chapel where the parish is now. The parish church in Barranquitas has been built but destroyed three times by hurricanes. The first church which was built between 1804 and 1809 was destroyed in 1825 by Hurricane Santa Ana. The second and third churches were destroyed by the 1876 San Felipe hurricane and in 1928 by Hurricane San Felipe Segundo. The current church was inaugurated in 1933 and renovated in 1980.

== History ==
Barranquitas barrio-pueblo was in Spain's gazetteers until Puerto Rico was ceded by Spain in the aftermath of the Spanish–American War under the terms of the Treaty of Paris of 1898 and became an unincorporated territory of the United States. In 1899, the United States Department of War conducted a census of Puerto Rico finding that the population of Barranquitas barrio-pueblo was 666.

Historical population
| Census | Pop. | Note | %± |
|---|---|---|---|
| 1900 | 666 | | — |
| 1910 | 772 | | 15.9% |
| 1920 | 896 | | 16.1% |
| 1930 | 1,462 | | 63.2% |
| 1940 | 1,816 | | 24.2% |
| 1950 | 4,268 | | 135.0% |
| 1960 | 4,684 | | 9.7% |
| 1970 | 4,508 | | −3.8% |
| 1980 | 3,618 | | −19.7% |
| 1990 | 2,786 | | −23.0% |
| 2000 | 2,910 | | 4.5% |
| 2010 | 2,695 | | −7.4% |
U.S. Decennial Census; 1899 (shown as 1900) 1910–1930; 1930–1950 1980–2000 2010

In July 2020, Federal Emergency Management Agency appropriated funds for repairs to Barranquitas' plaza.

== Features ==
El Cortijo which was known for many decades as El Castillo is a historic castle in Barranquitas barrio-pueblo.

An annual art festival is held every July in Barranquitas barrio-pueblo. The 52nd edition of the festival was held in 2013.

== Gallery ==
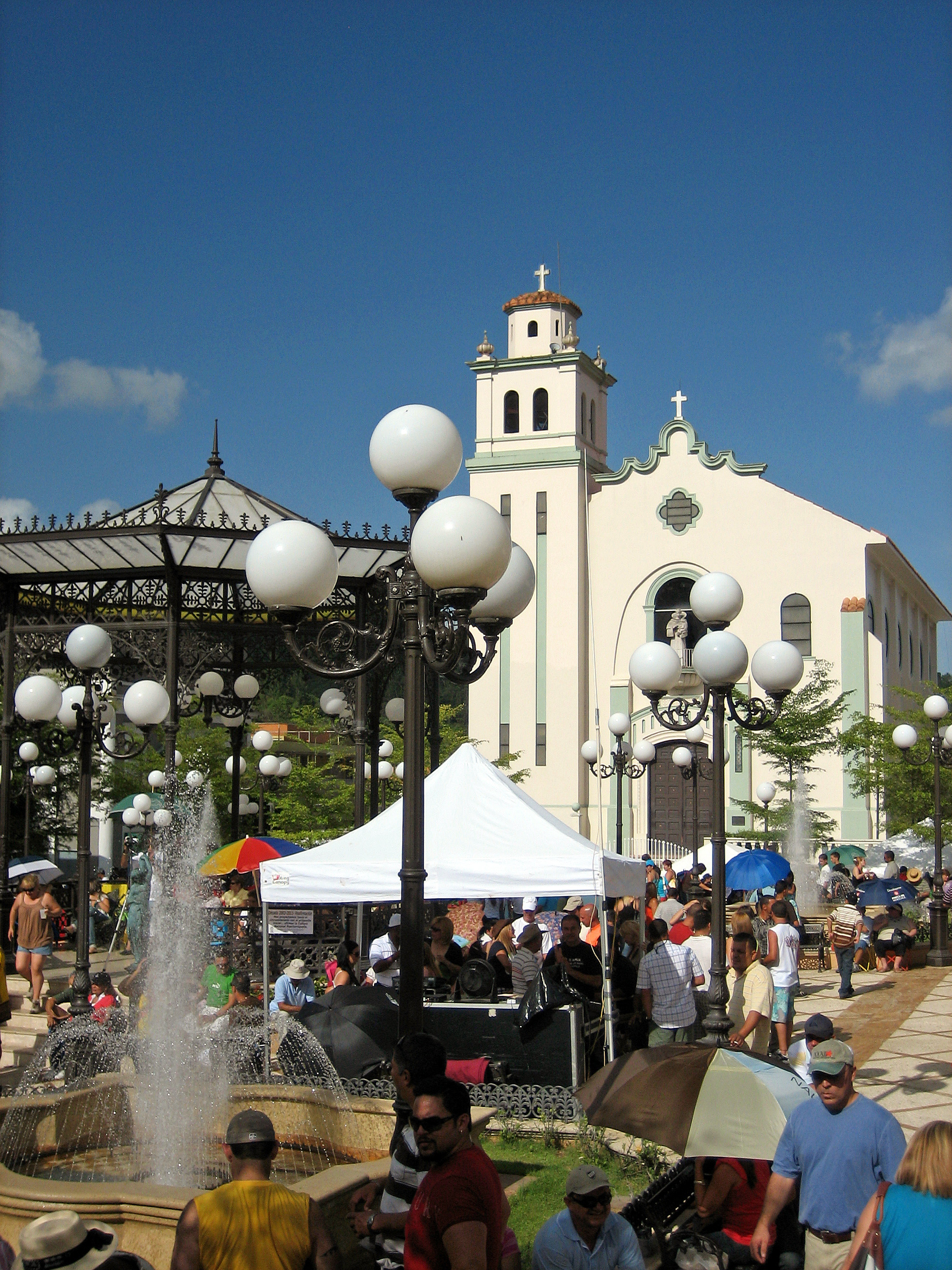
Annual art festival in Barranquitas barrio-pueblo

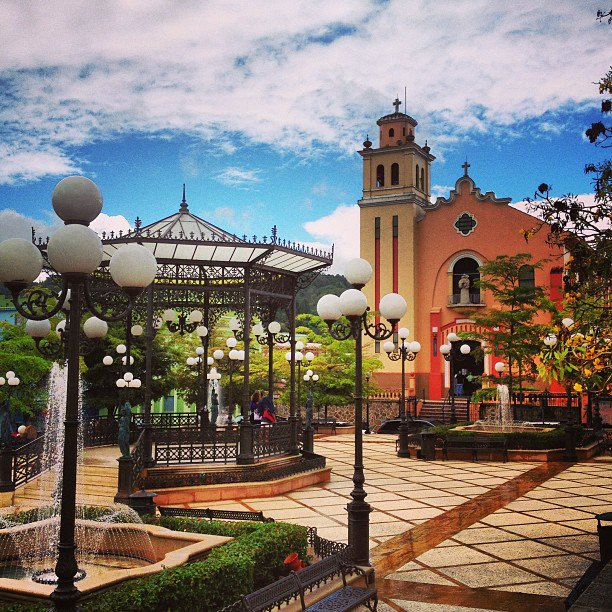
Barranquita's main plaza and church. (2013)

== See also ==
- List of communities in Puerto Rico
