= Anones =

Barrio of Naranjito, Puerto Rico

- Barrio
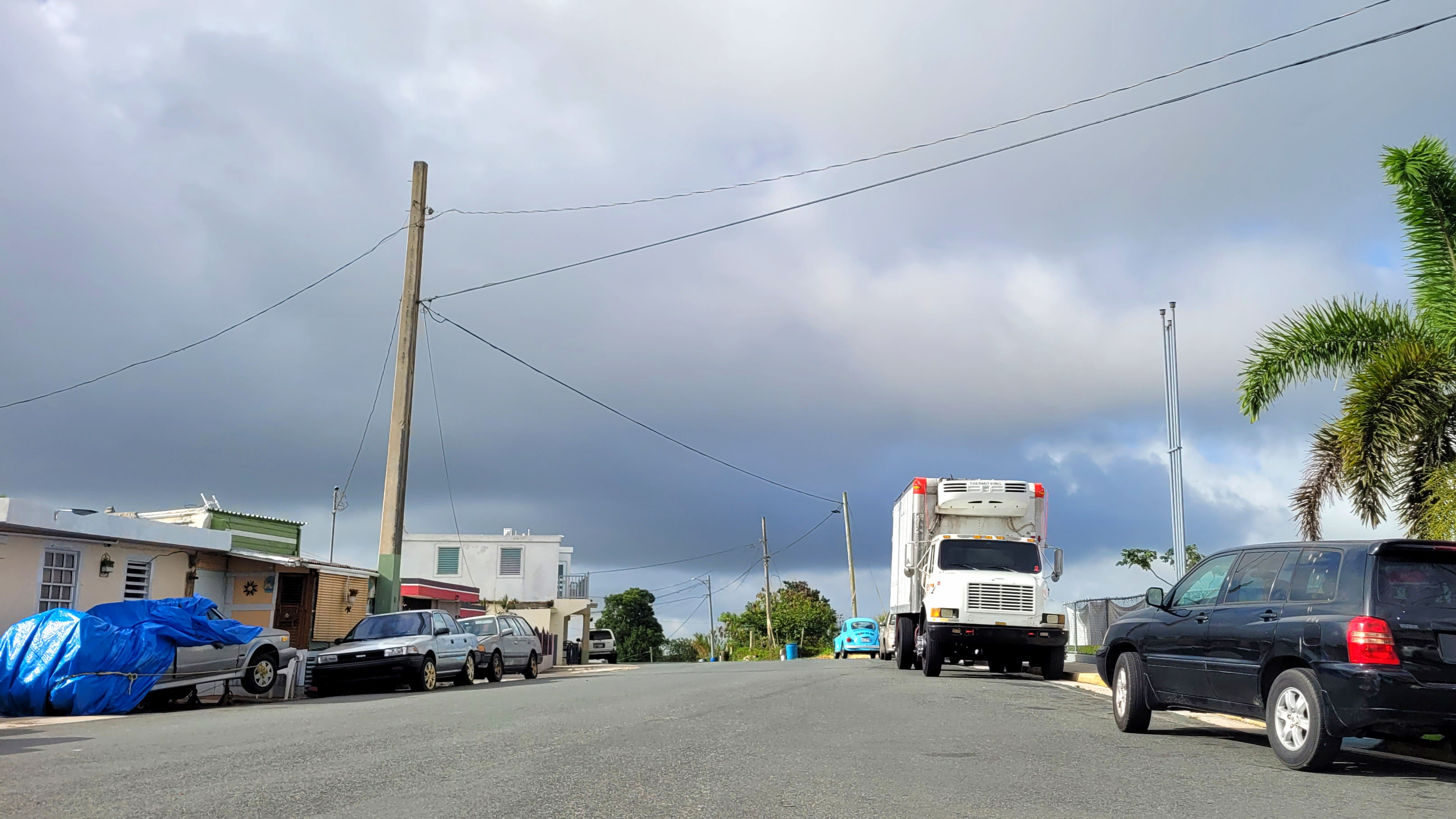
- Puerto Rico Highway 878 in Anones

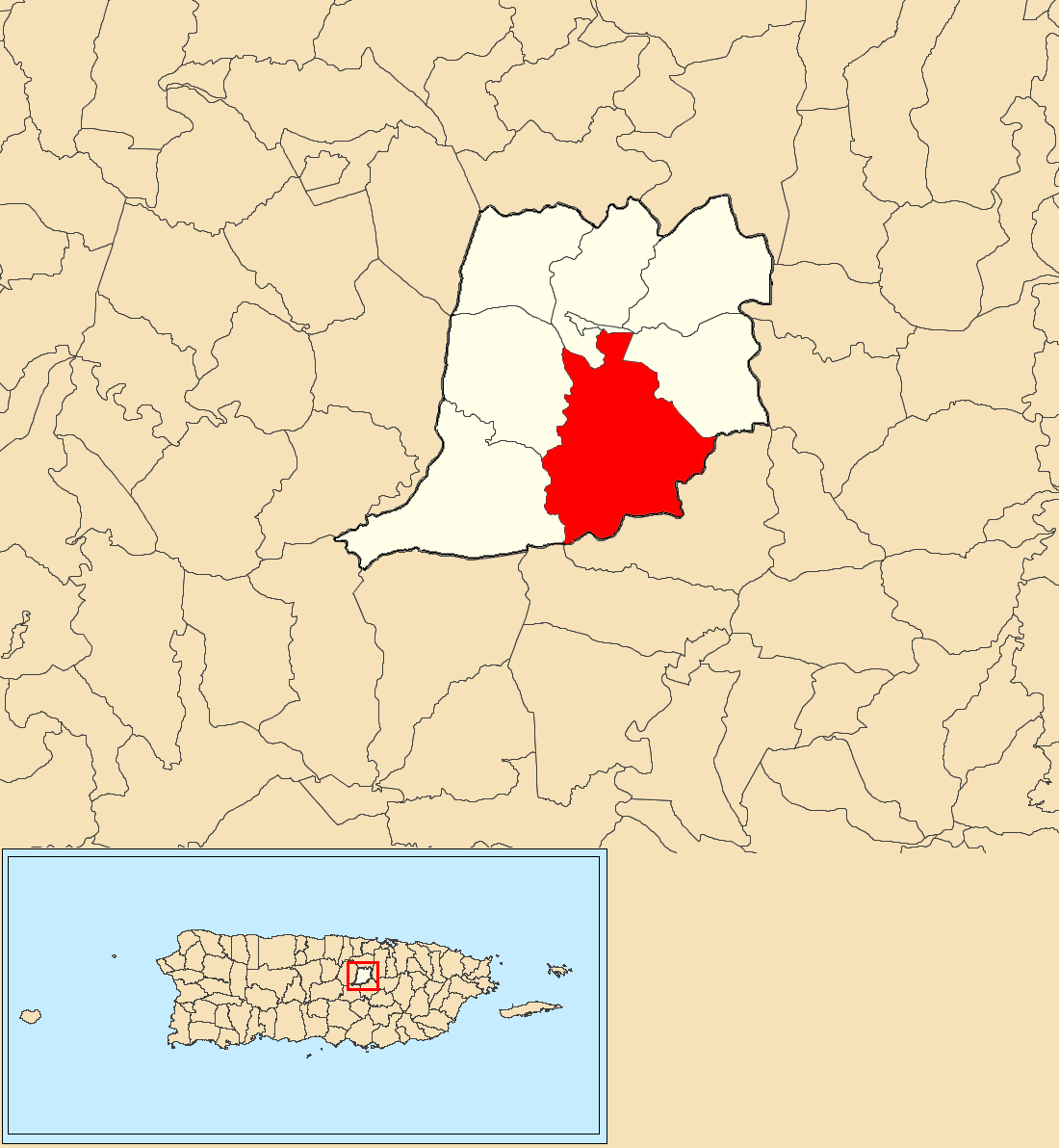
- Location of Anones within the municipality of Naranjito shown in red

- Location of Puerto Rico
- Coordinates: 18°16′22″N 66°14′50″W
- Commonwealth: Puerto Rico
- Municipality: Naranjito

Area
  - Total: 5.94 sq mi (15.4 km^{2})
  - Land: 5.94 sq mi (15.4 km^{2})
  - Water: 0 sq mi (0 km^{2})
- Elevation: 1,634 ft (498 m)

Population (2010)
  - Total: 4,976
  - Density: 837.7/sq mi (323.4/km^{2})
- Source: 2010 Census
- Time zone: UTC−4 (AST)
- ZIP code: 00719
- Area code: 787/939

Anones is a barrio in the municipality of Naranjito, Puerto Rico. Its population in 2010 was 4,976. Anones is located to the South of the urban center of the municipality. There are schools and shops here and it is the most mountainous area of the municipality.

== History ==
Anones was in Spain's gazetteers until Puerto Rico was ceded by Spain in the aftermath of the Spanish–American War under the terms of the Treaty of Paris of 1898 and became an unincorporated territory of the United States. In 1899, the United States Department of War conducted a census of Puerto Rico finding that the population of Anones barrio was 1,420.

Historical population
Census	Pop.	Note	%±
1900	1,420		—
1910	1,656		16.6%
1920	1,746		5.4%
1930	1,951		11.7%
1940	2,161		10.8%
1950	2,220		2.7%
1960	2,128		−4.1%
1970	2,310		8.6%
1980	3,218		39.3%
1990	3,974		23.5%
2000	4,518		13.7%
2010	4,976		10.1%
U.S. Decennial Census; 1899 (shown as 1900) 1910-1930; 1930-1950 1980-2000 2010

== Sectors ==
Barrios (which are, in contemporary times, roughly comparable to minor civil divisions) in turn are further subdivided into smaller local populated place areas/units called sectores (sectors in English). The types of sectores may vary, from normally sector to urbanización to reparto to barriada to residencial, among others.

The following sectors are in Anones barrio:

Anones Díaz, Anones Don Tito, Carretera 152, Camino Manolín González, Comunidad Las Lágrimas, Comunidad Rogelio Ferrer, La Maya, La Sierra, Los Matos, Sector Álvaro Rodríguez, Sector Beltrán, Sector Cátala, Sector Cayito Ríos, Sector Cuatro Puertas, Sector El Cerro, Sector El Palmar, Sector El Pollito, Sector Flor Maure, Sector Fuentes, Sector Hernández, Sector Juan Sostre Coreano, Sector Los Vasallos, Sector Marcano, Sector Merce Alicea, Sector Mirador, Sector Ledis Diaz, Sector Molina, Sector Palin Cátala, Sector Pablo Cátala, Sector Punto Fijo, Rodríguez, Tito Cátala, and Villa Polilla.

== See also ==
- List of communities in Puerto Rico
- List of barrios and sectors of Naranjito, Puerto Rico
