= Quebradillas, Barranquitas, Puerto Rico =

Barrio of Puerto Rico

Quebradillas
- Barrio
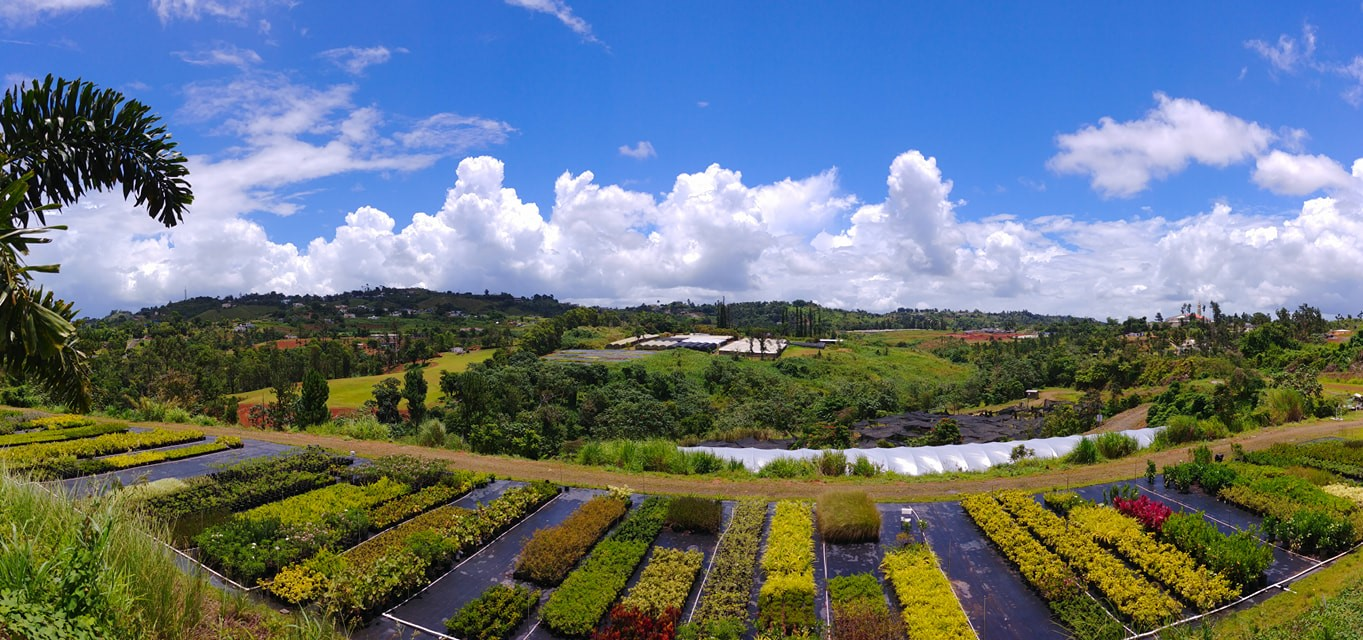
- Agricultural landscape in Quebradillas

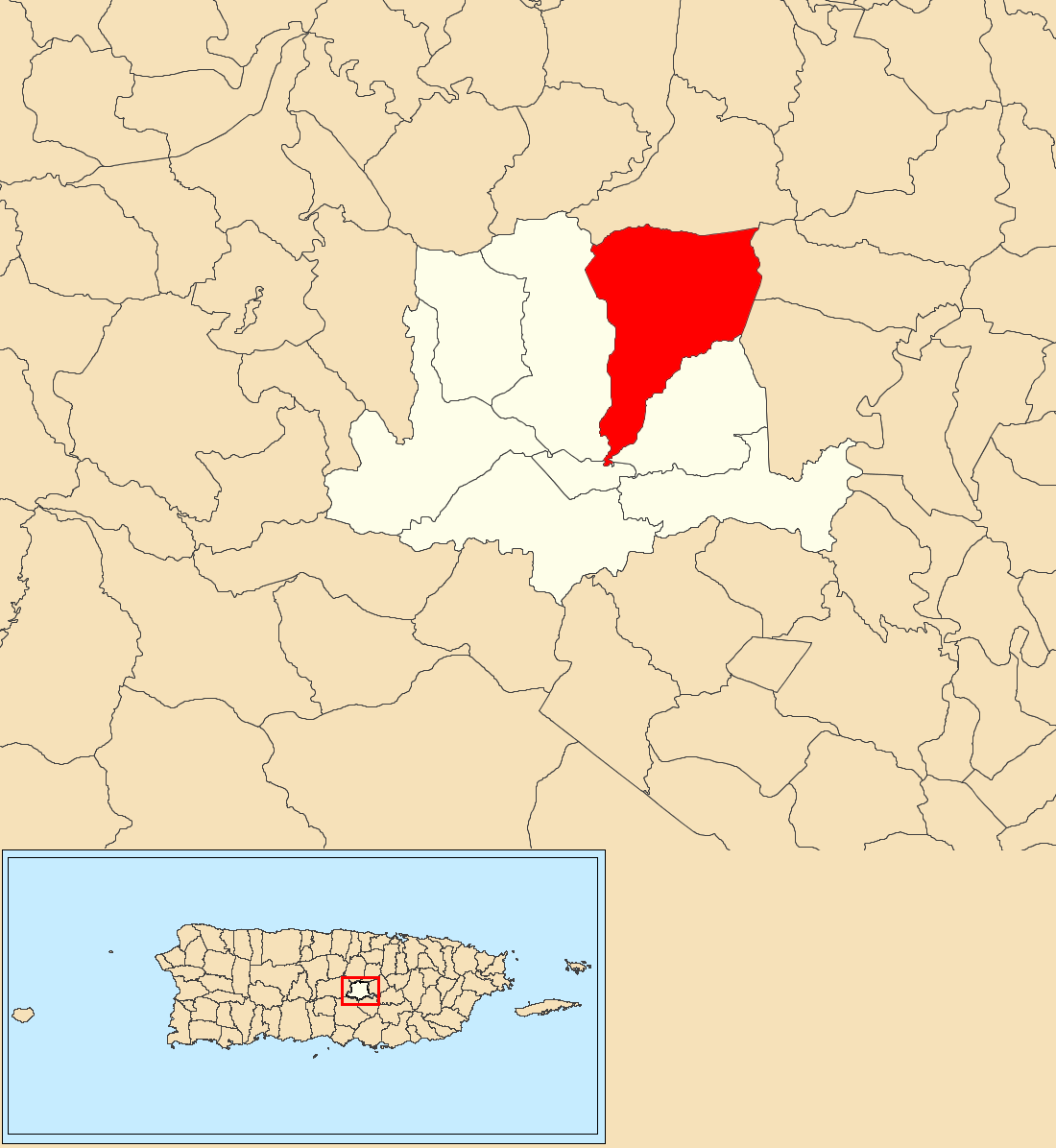
- Location of Quebradillas within the municipality of Barranquitas shown in red

- Location of Puerto Rico
- Coordinates: 18°13′30″N 66°17′21″W
- Commonwealth: Puerto Rico
- Municipality: Barranquitas

Area
  - Total: 6.27 sq mi (16.2 km^{2})
  - Land: 6.27 sq mi (16.2 km^{2})
  - Water: 0.00 sq mi (0 km^{2})
- Elevation: 1,768 ft (539 m)

Population (2010)
  - Total: 6,035
  - Density: 337.3/sq mi (130.2/km^{2})
- Source: 2010 Census
- Time zone: UTC−4 (AST)
- ZIP Code: 00794
- Area code: 787/939

Quebradillas is a barrio in the municipality of Barranquitas, Puerto Rico. Its population in 2010 was 6,035.

== History ==
Quebradillas was in Spain's gazetteers until Puerto Rico was ceded by Spain in the aftermath of the Spanish–American War under the terms of the Treaty of Paris of 1898 and became an unincorporated territory of the United States. In 1899, the United States Department of War conducted a census of Puerto Rico finding that the population of Quebradillas barrio was 1,051.

Historical population
Census	Pop.	Note	%±
1900	1,051		—
1910	1,918		82.5%
1920	1,949		1.6%
1930	2,026		4.0%
1940	2,194		8.3%
1950	1,906		−13.1%
1960	2,456		28.9%
1970	2,505		2.0%
1980	3,477		38.8%
1990	4,396		26.4%
2000	5,424		23.4%
2010	6,035		11.3%
U.S. Decennial Census; 1899 (shown as 1900) 1910-1930; 1930-1950 1980-2000 2010

== Gallery ==
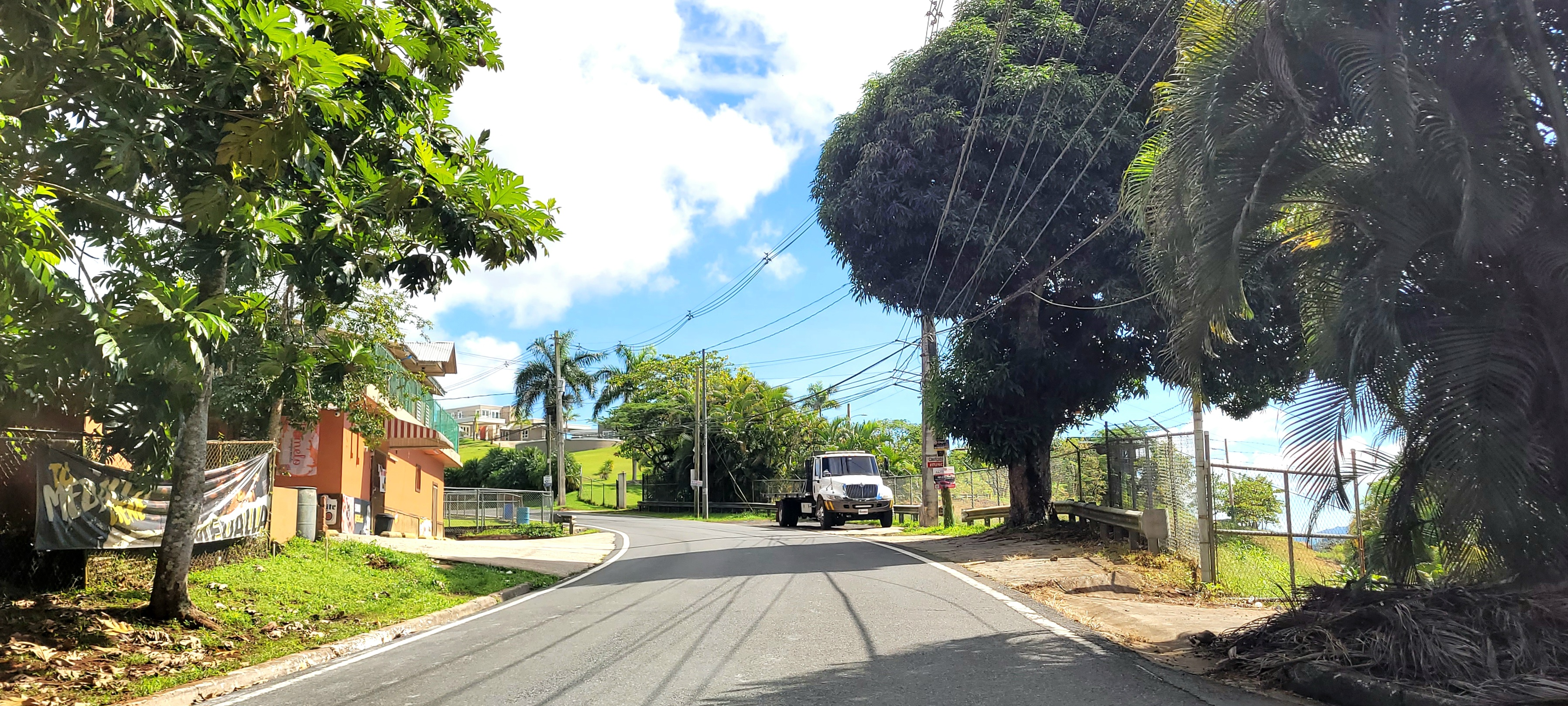
Puerto Rico Highway 779 in Quebradillas barrio

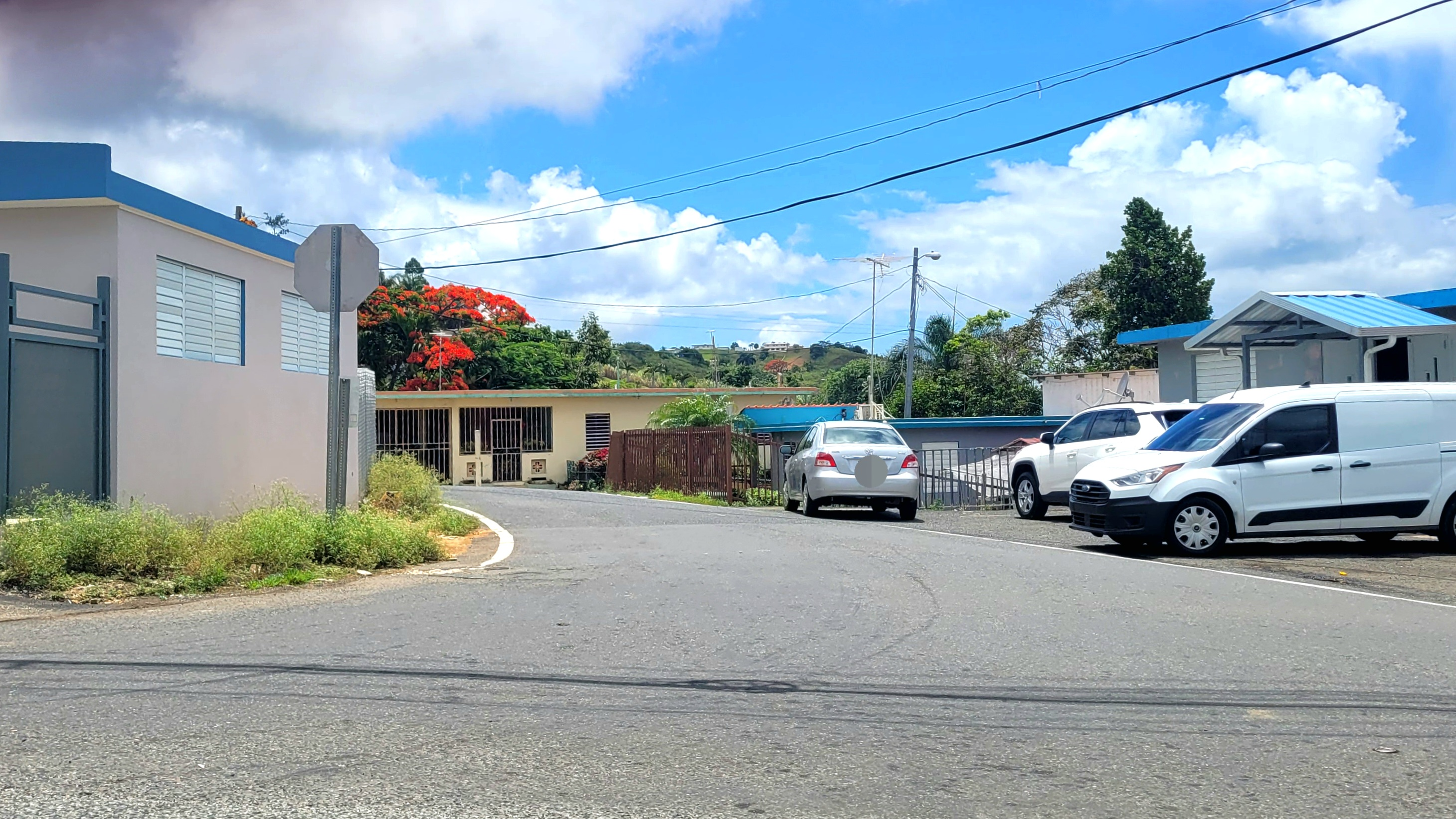
Puerto Rico Highway 7773 in Quebradillas barrio

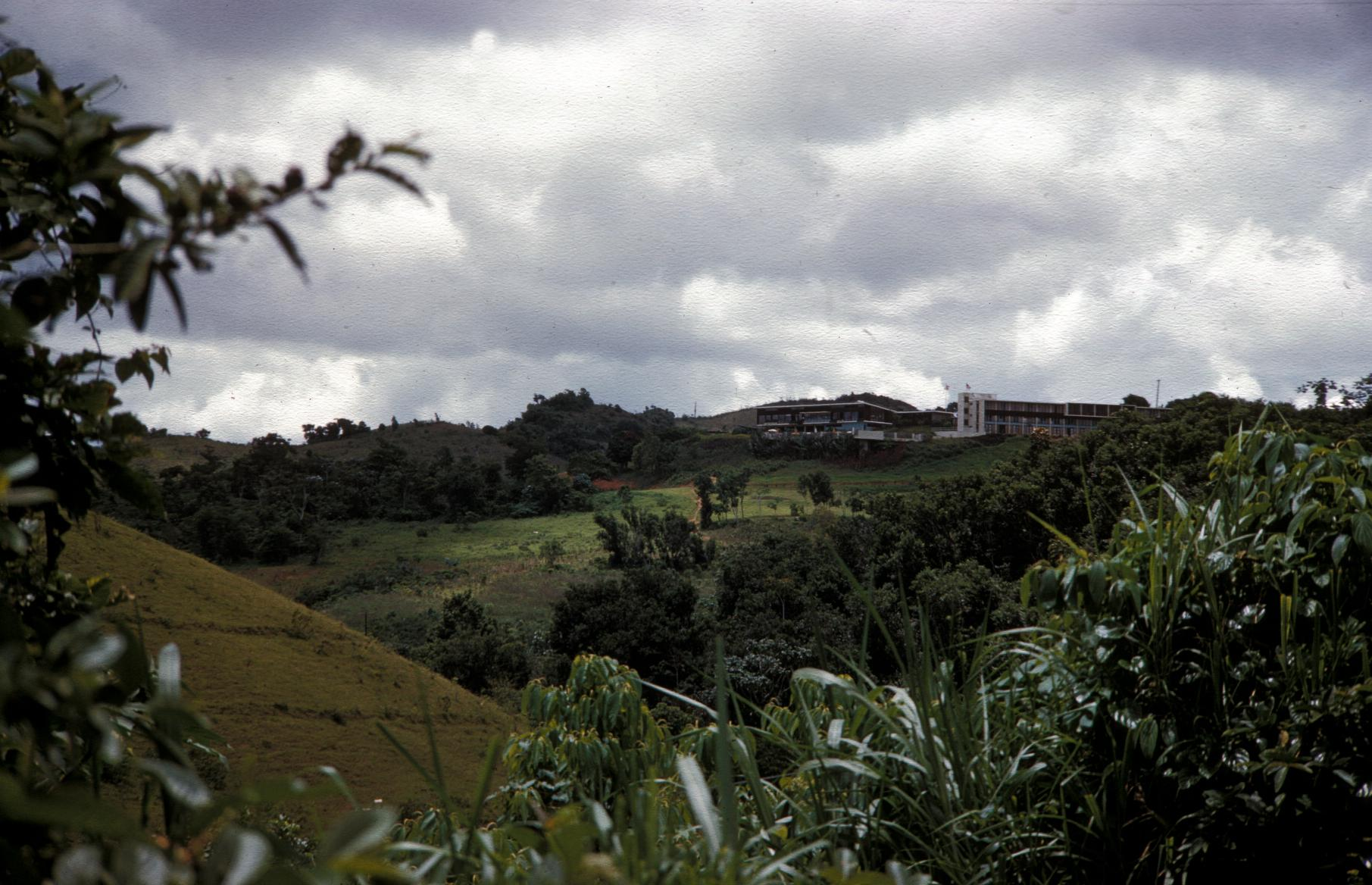
Hotel El Barranquitas, (c. 1950) in Quebradillas was well-known in the 1960s and 1970s

== See also ==
- List of communities in Puerto Rico
