= Cedro Abajo =

Barrio of Naranjito, Puerto Rico

- Barrio
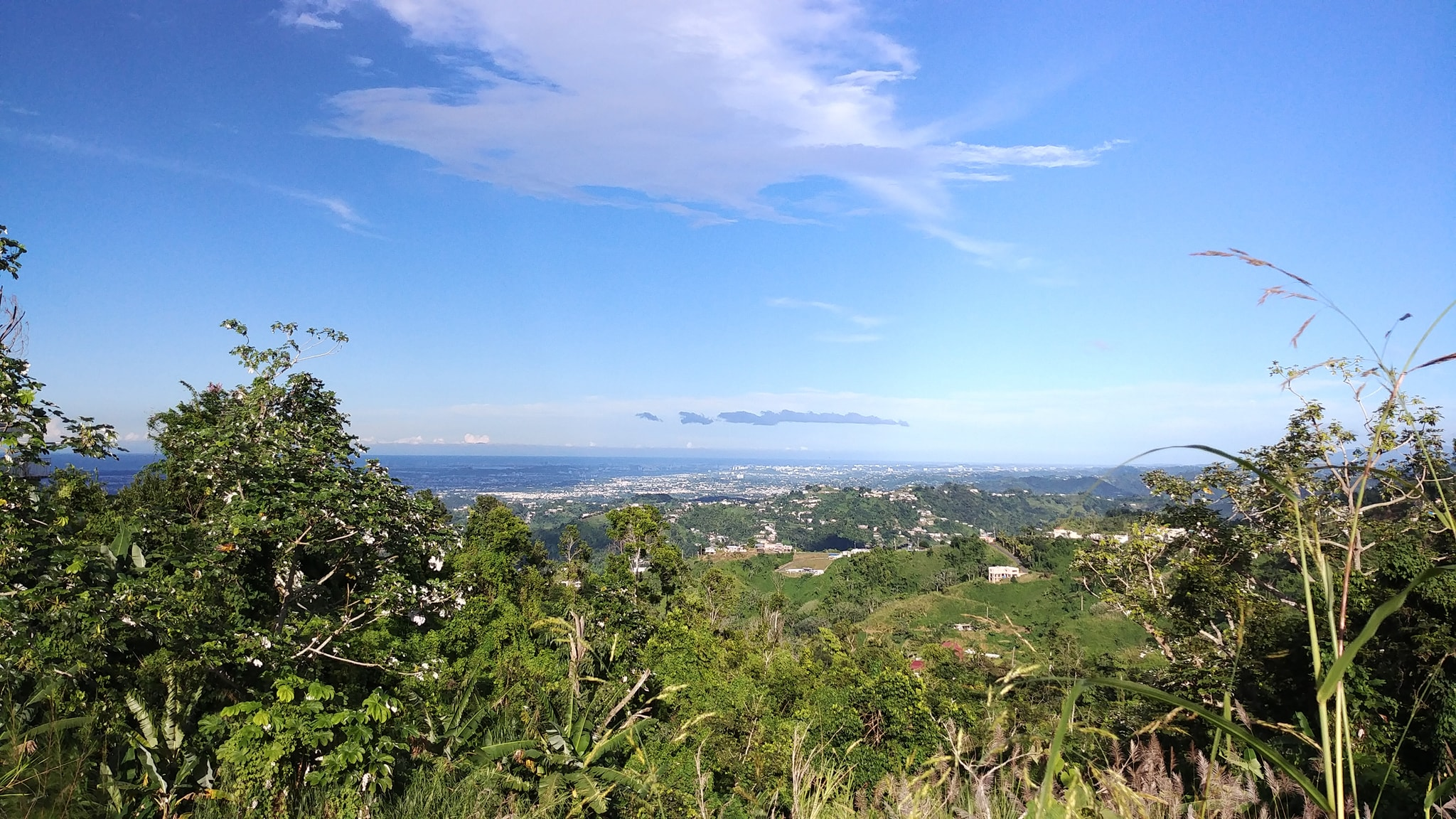
- Looking northeast from Cedro Abajo

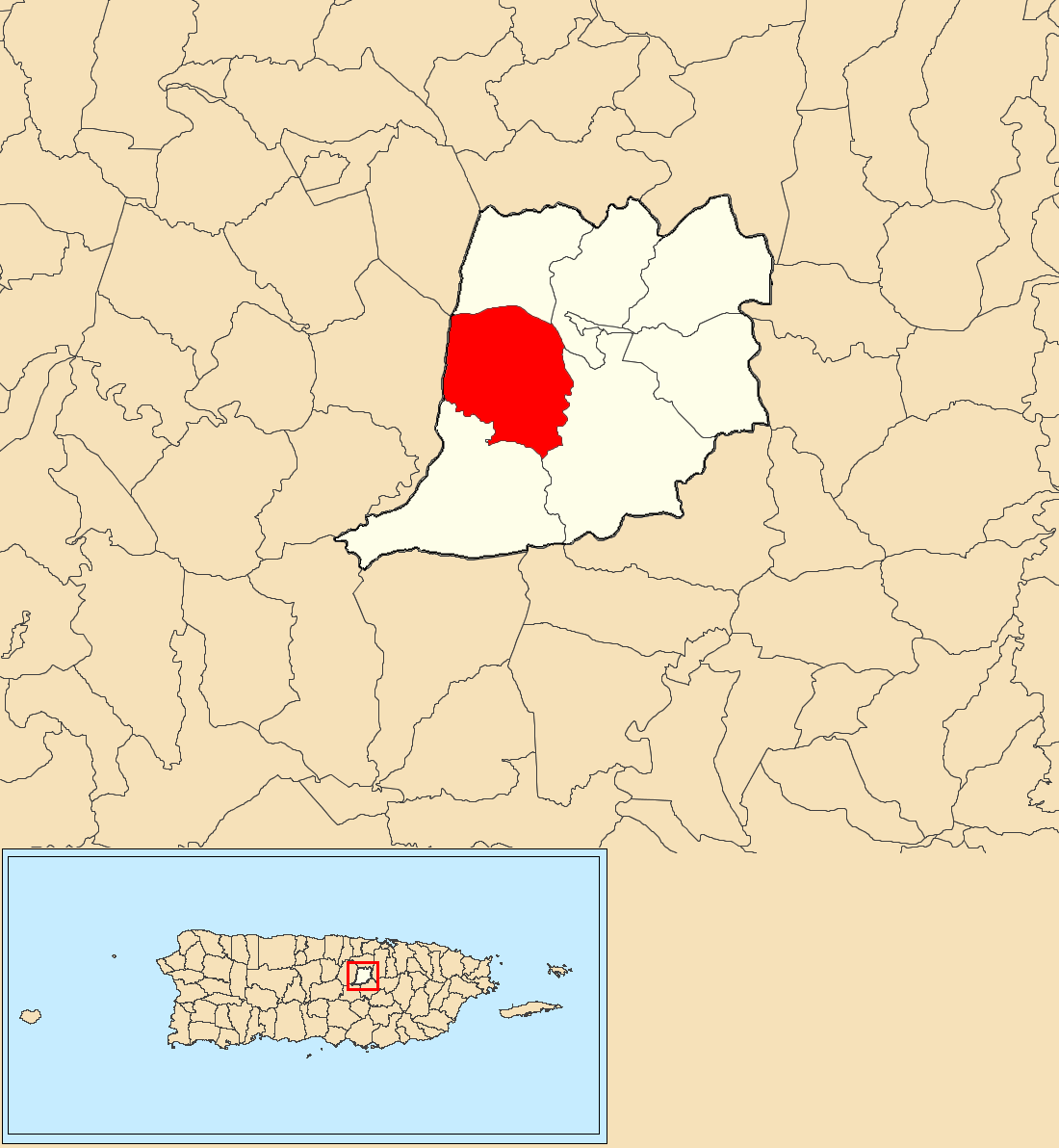
- Location of Cedro Abajo within the municipality of Naranjito shown in red

- Location of Puerto Rico
- Coordinates: 18°17′06″N 66°16′14″W
- Commonwealth: Puerto Rico
- Municipality: Naranjito

Area
  - Total: 3.91 sq mi (10.1 km^{2})
  - Land: 3.90 sq mi (10.1 km^{2})
  - Water: 0.01 sq mi (0.026 km^{2})
- Elevation: 1,588 ft (484 m)

Population (2020)
  - Total: 4,468
  - Density: 1,186.4/sq mi (458.1/km^{2})
- Source: 2020 Census
- Time zone: UTC−4 (AST)
- ZIP code: 00719
- Area code: 787/939

Cedro Abajo is a barrio in the municipality of Naranjito, Puerto Rico. Its population in 2010 was 4,627, and in 2020 was 4,468.

== History ==
Cedro Abajo was in Spain's gazetteers until Puerto Rico was ceded by Spain in the aftermath of the Spanish–American War under the terms of the Treaty of Paris of 1898 and became an unincorporated territory of the United States. In 1899, the United States Department of War conducted a census of Puerto Rico finding that the population of Cedro Abajo barrio was 977.

Historical population
Census	Pop.	Note	%±
1900	977		—
1910	948		−3.0%
1920	1,170		23.4%
1930	1,218		4.1%
1940	1,531		25.7%
1950	1,710		11.7%
1960	1,901		11.2%
1970	2,649		39.3%
1980	3,205		21.0%
1990	3,732		16.4%
2000	4,278		14.6%
2010	4,627		8.2%
2020	4,468		−3.4%
U.S. Decennial Census; 1899 (shown as 1900) 1910-1930; 1930-1950 1980-2000 2010

== Sectors ==
Barrios (which are, in contemporary times, roughly comparable to minor civil divisions) in turn are further subdivided into smaller local populated place areas/units called sectores (sectors in English). The types of sectores may vary, from normally sector to urbanización to reparto to barriada to residencial, among others.

The following sectors are in Cedro Abajo barrio:

Camino Roberto Rodríguez, Camino Toño Nieves, Comunidad Belén, El Hoyo, Higuillales, Lalo López, Sector Berríos, Sector Cuatro Calles, Sector El Bronco, Sector Felipa Sánchez, Sector Juan Cosme, Sector Juan López, Sector La Cantera, Sector La Telefónica, Sector Las Cumbres, Sector Los Bistec, Sector Los Pagán, Sector Los Pelusa, Sector Mero Morales, Sector Pepe Morales, Sector Pepito Berríos, and Sector Sabana.

== Gallery ==
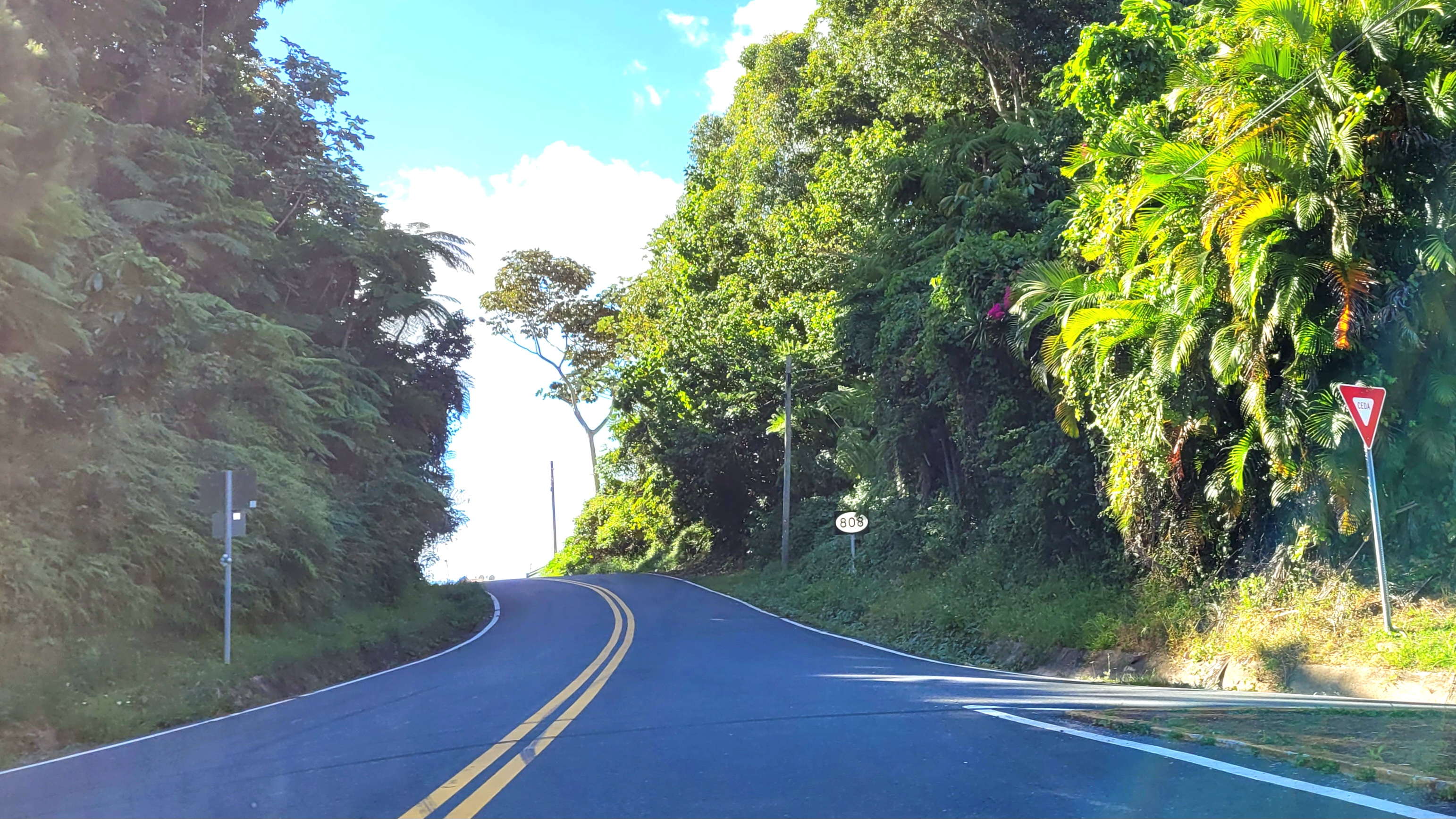
Puerto Rico Highway 808 in Cedro Abajo

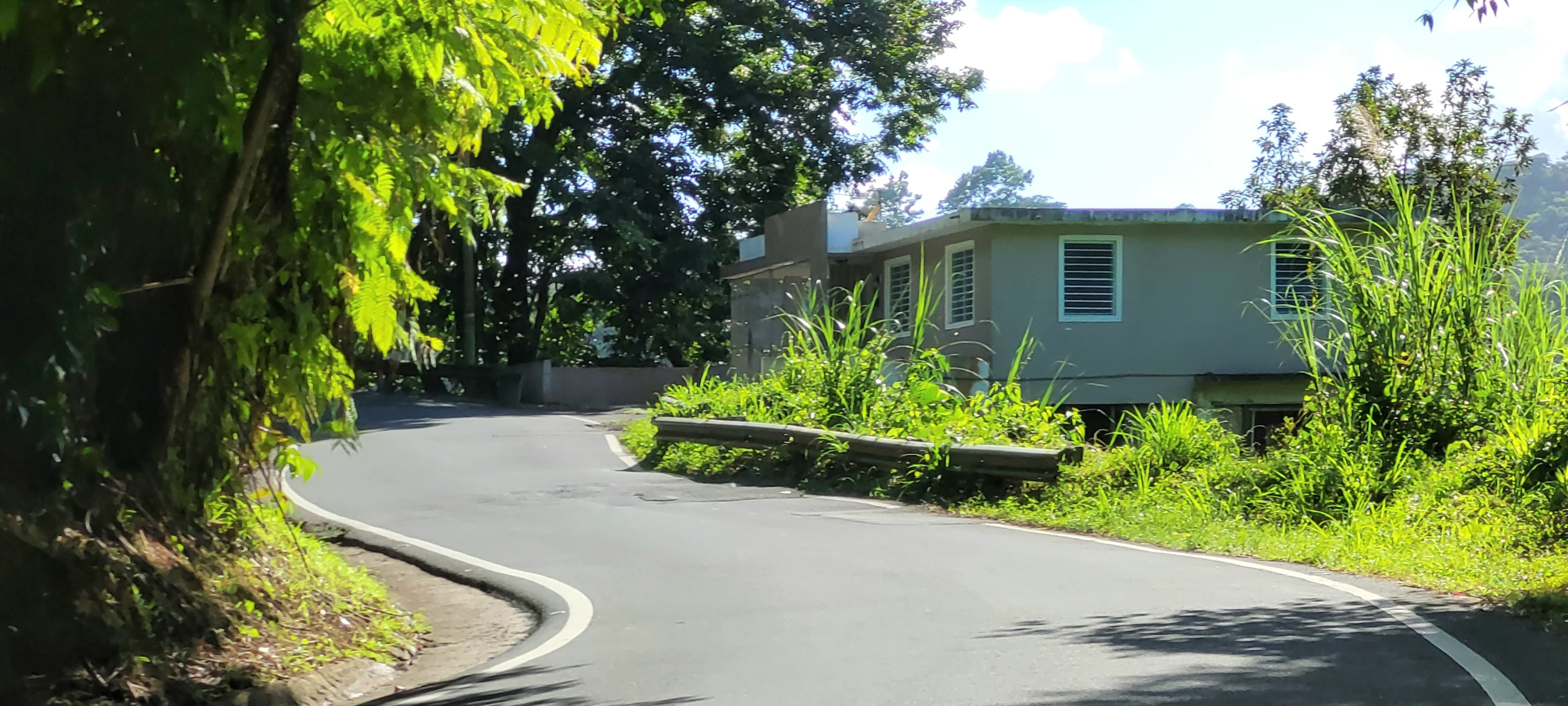
Puerto Rico Highway 811 in Cedro Abajo

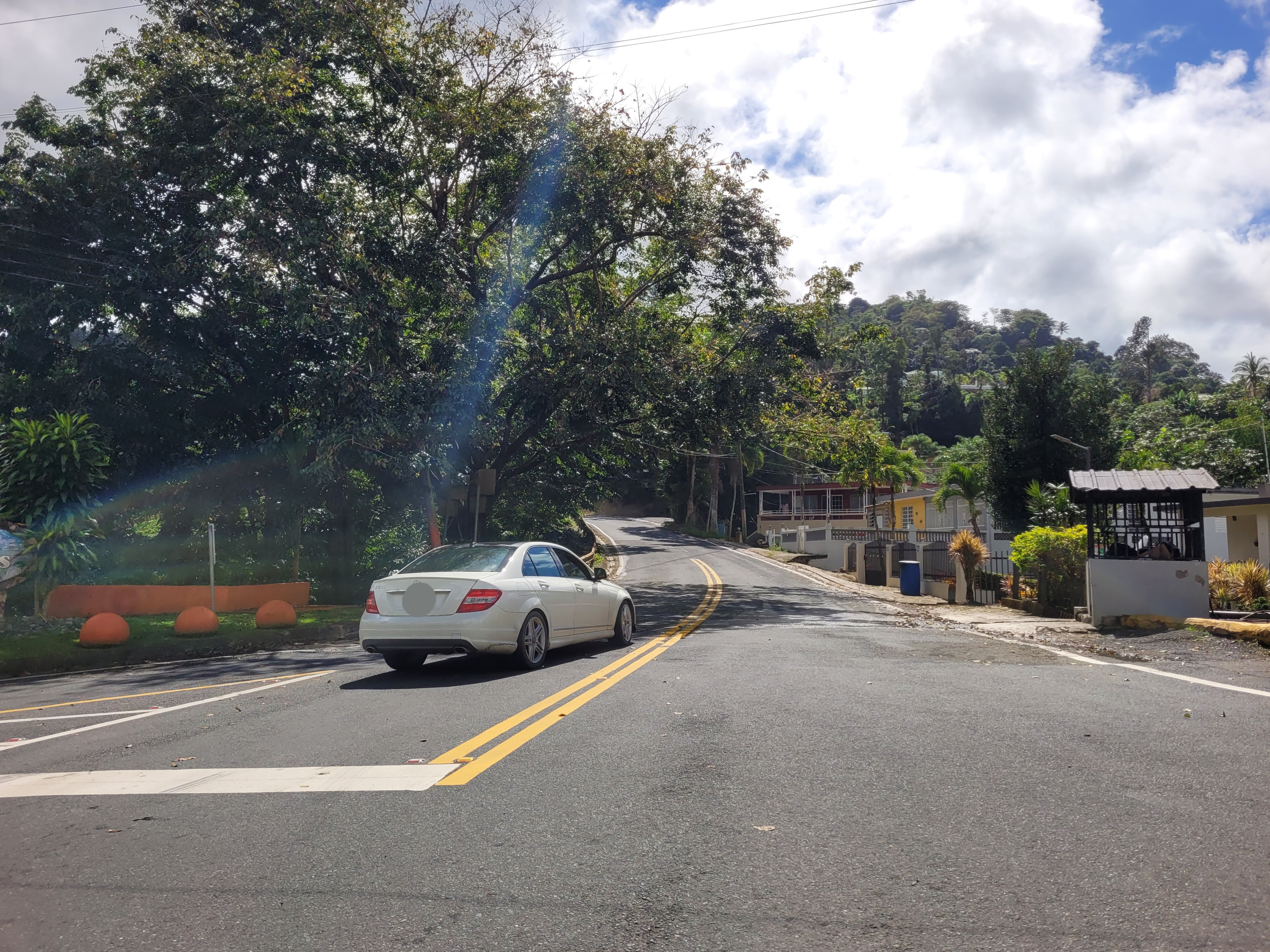
Puerto Rico Highway 814 in Cedro Abajo

== See also ==
- List of communities in Puerto Rico
- List of barrios and sectors of Naranjito, Puerto Rico
