= Puerto Rico Highway 806 =

Highway in Puerto Rico

Highway 806
- Ruta 806

Route information
- Maintained by Puerto Rico DTPW
- Length: 1.9 km (1.2 mi)

Major junctions
- South end: PR-159 in Palmarejo–Abras
- North end: PR-823 in Quebrada Arenas

Location
- Country: United States
- Territory: Puerto Rico
- Municipalities: Corozal, Toa Alta

Highway system
- Roads in Puerto Rico; List
← PR-805	→ PR-807

Puerto Rico Highway 806 (PR-806) is a north–south road between the municipalities of Corozal and Toa Alta in Puerto Rico. With a length of 1.9 kilometers (1.2 mi), it begins at PR-159 junction between Palmarejo and Abras barrios in Corozal, and ends at PR-823 intersection in Quebrada Arenas barrio in Toa Alta.

== Route description ==
Puerto Rico Highway 806 is a rural road with a single lane per direction along its entire length. In Corozal, it has a short length from PR-159 junction to the Toa Alta municipal limit. In Toa Alta, PR-806 extends from the Corozal municipal limit to PR-823 junction. The entire length in Corozal is located in Abras barrio, while in Toa Alta it is located entirely in Quebrada Arenas barrio.

Puerto Rico Highway 806 by municipality

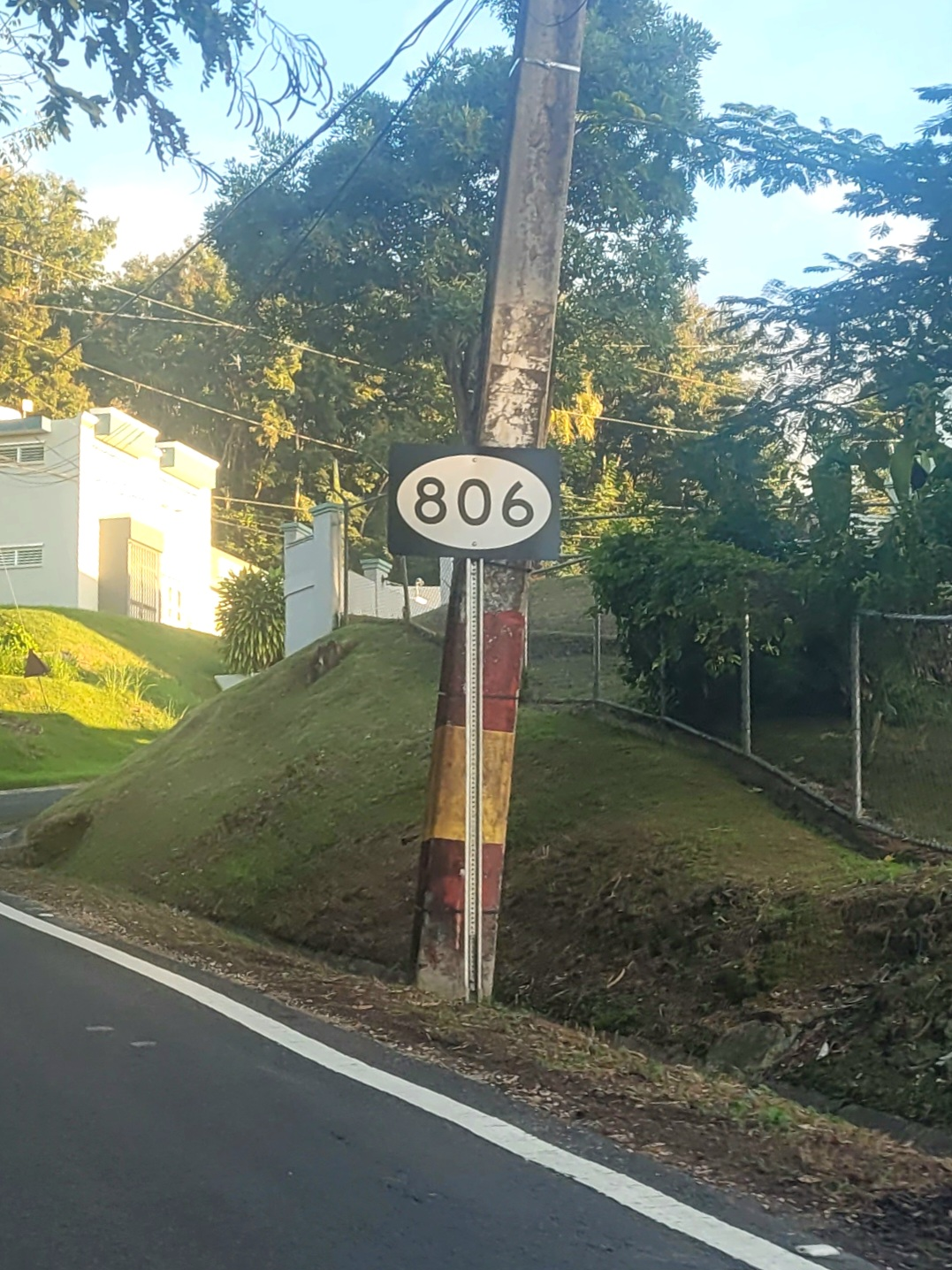
Northbound sign in Corozal

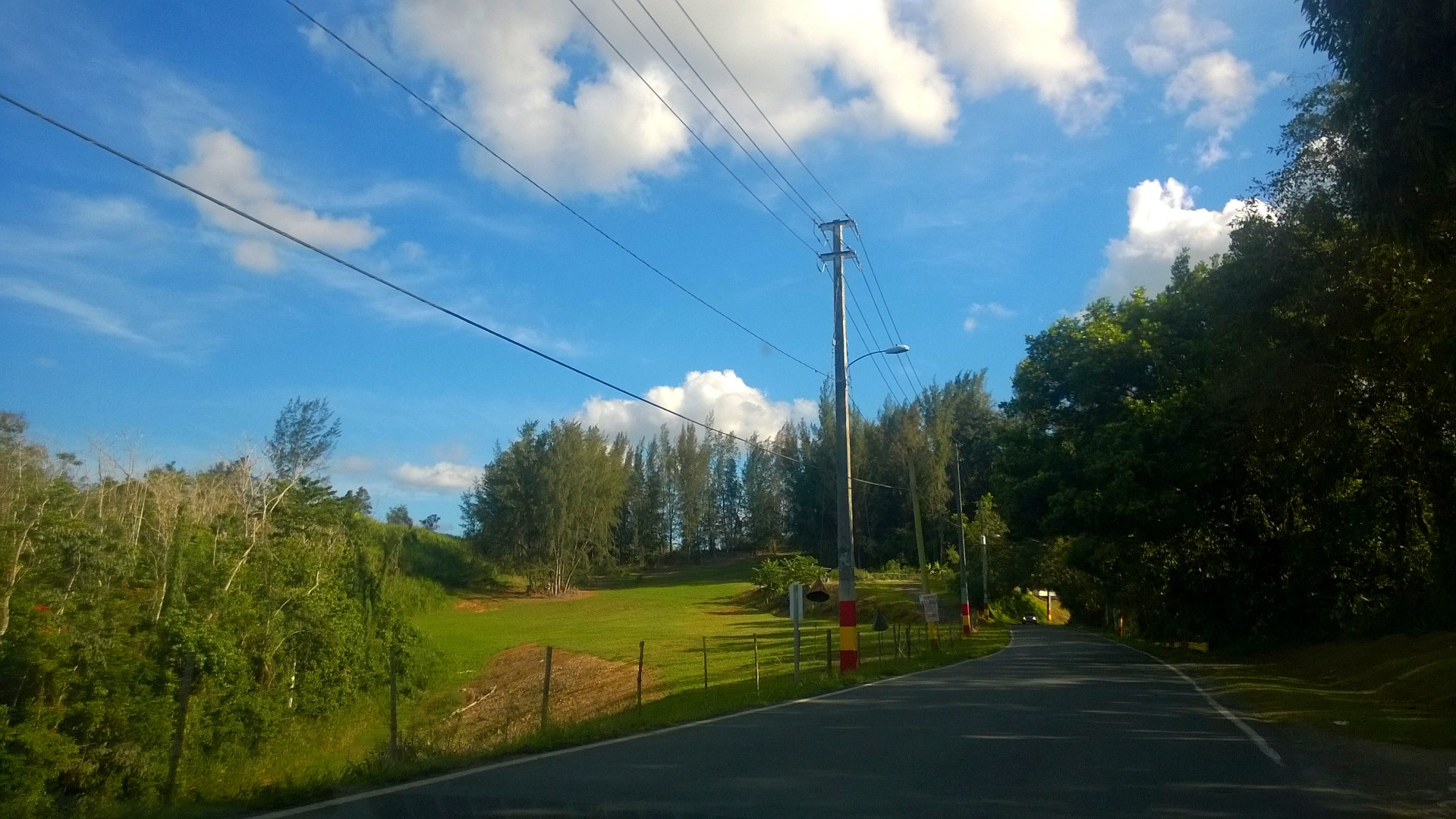
Heading south between Toa Alta and Corozal

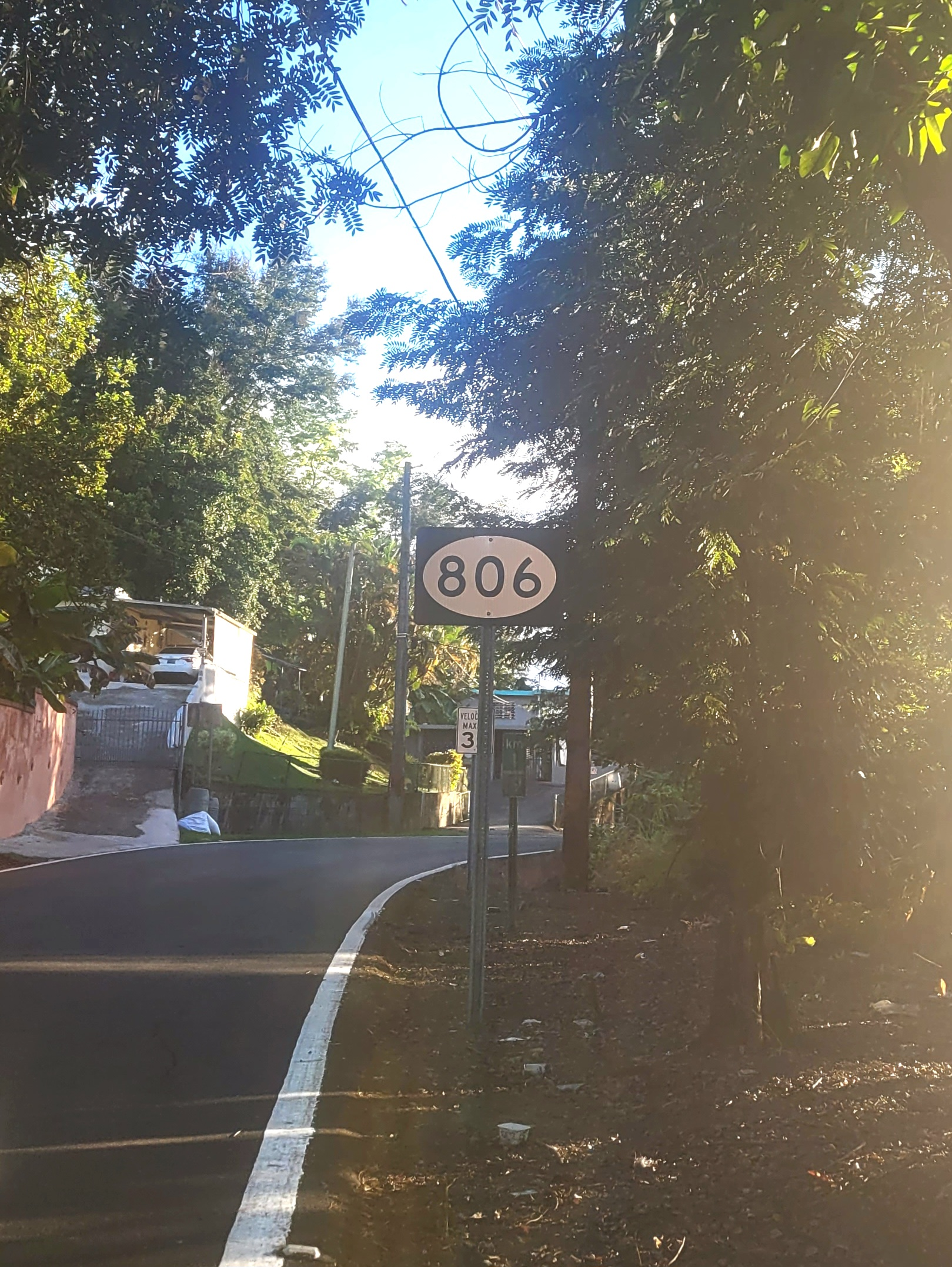
Southbound sign in Toa Alta

== History ==
Prior to its numerical designation, PR-806 was only known as the road that goes to the Carretera del Güinche from the old Road No. 10 (current PR-159). The current numerical designation corresponds to the 1953 Puerto Rico highway renumbering, a process implemented by the Puerto Rico Department of Transportation and Public Works (Spanish: Departamento de Transportación y Obras Públicas) that increased the insular highway network to connect existing routes with different locations around Puerto Rico.

== Major intersections ==
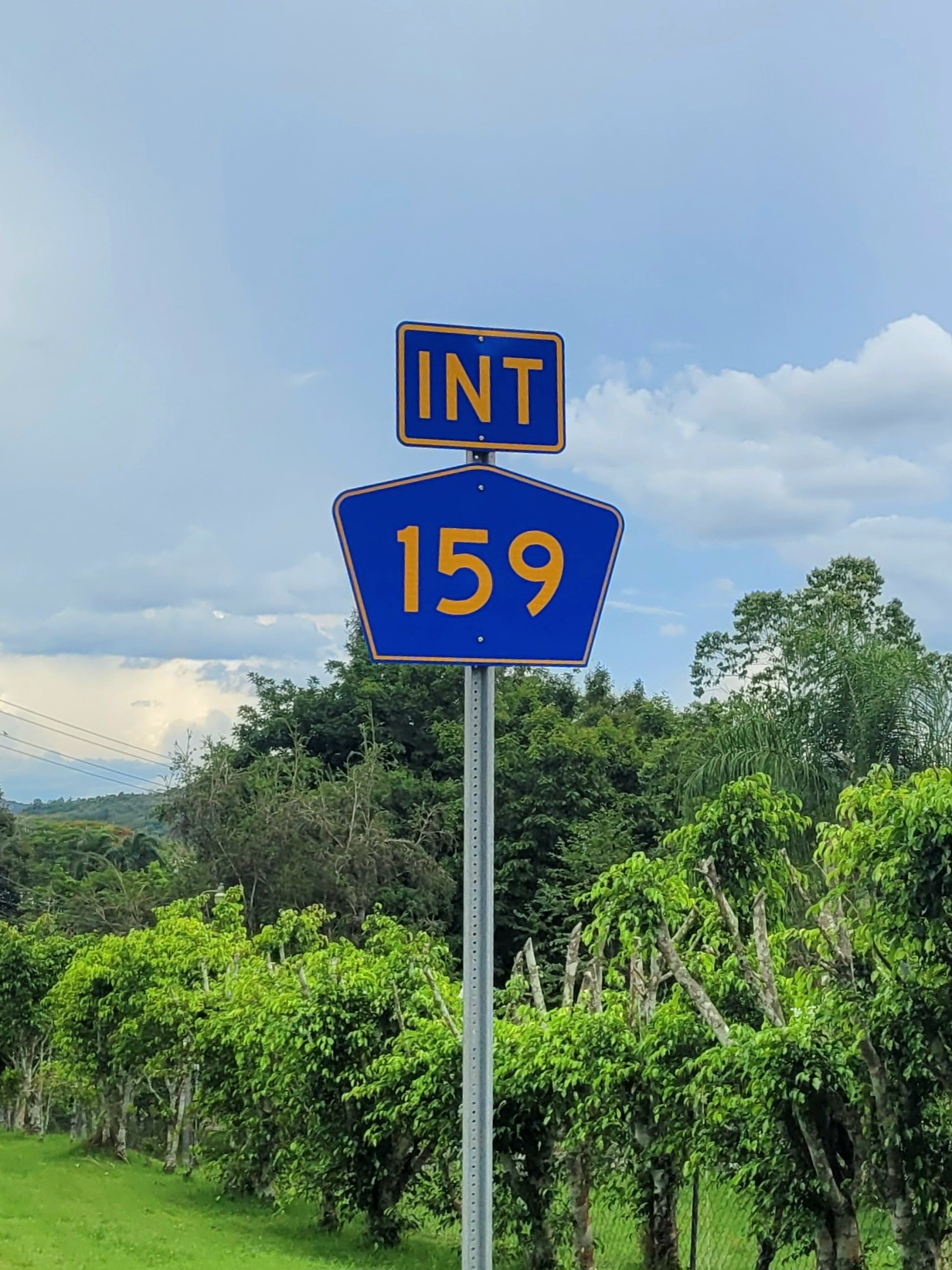
PR-806 south near PR-159 junction in Corozal

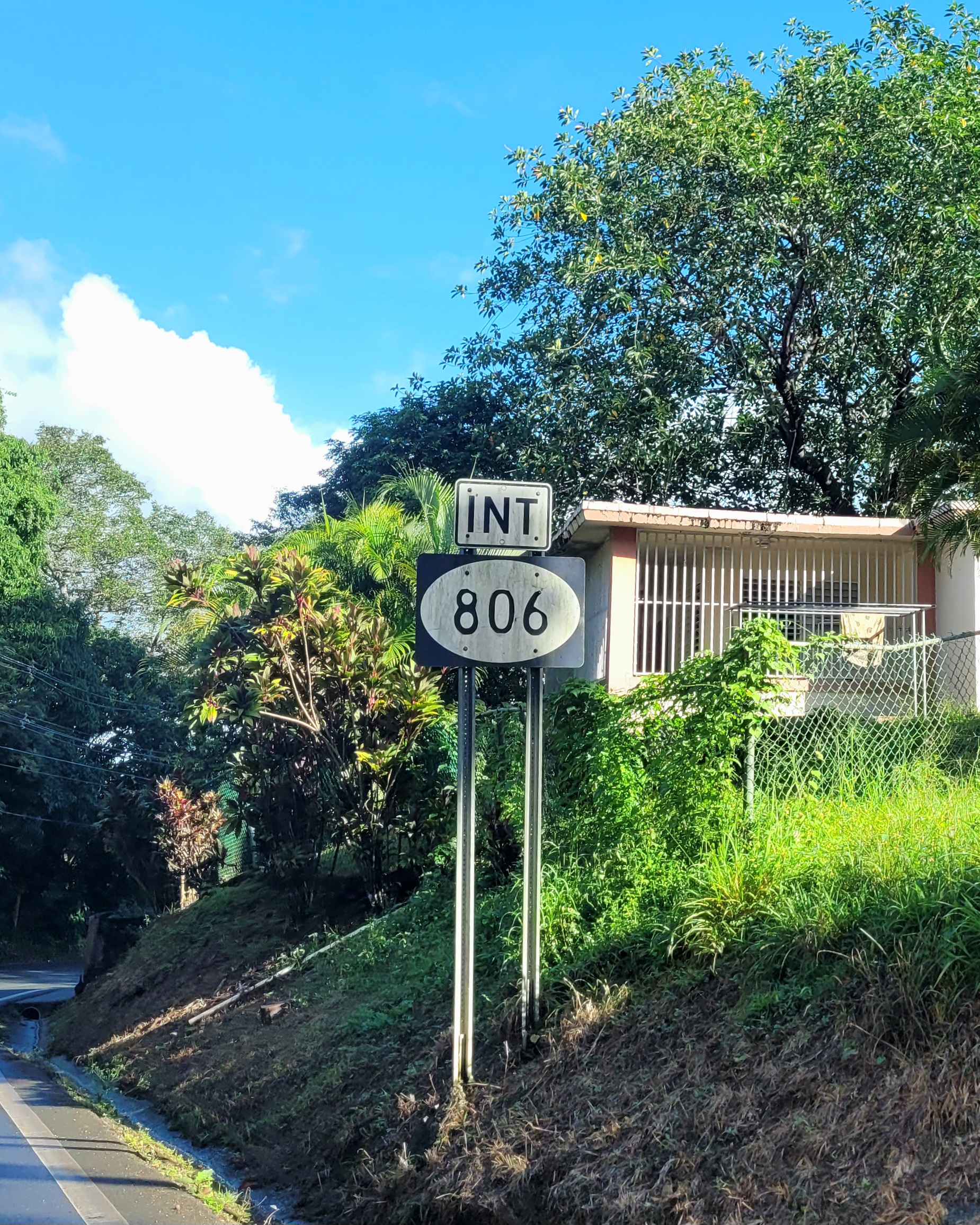
PR-159 west approaching PR-806 intersection in Corozal

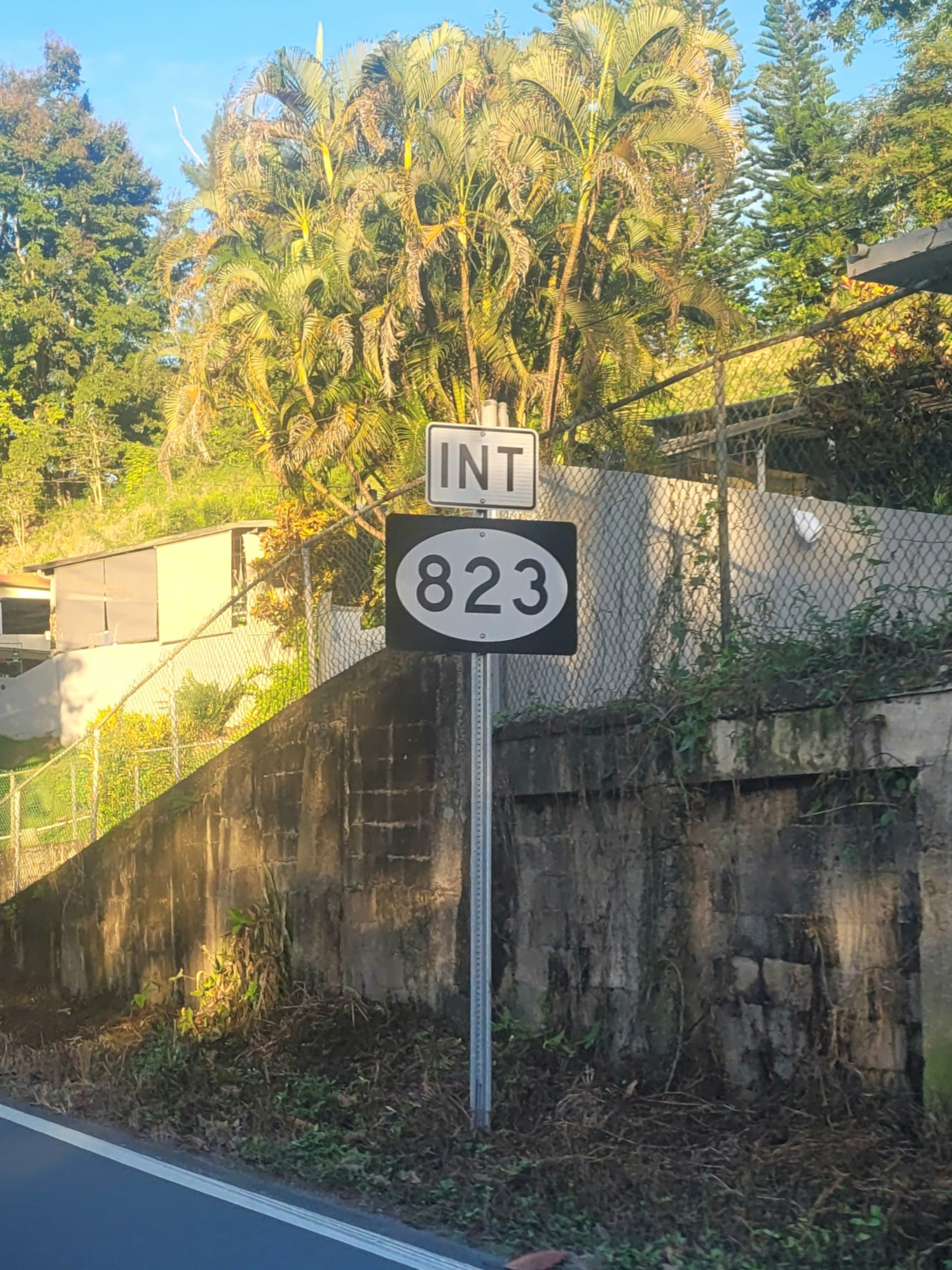
PR-806 north near PR-823 junction in Toa Alta

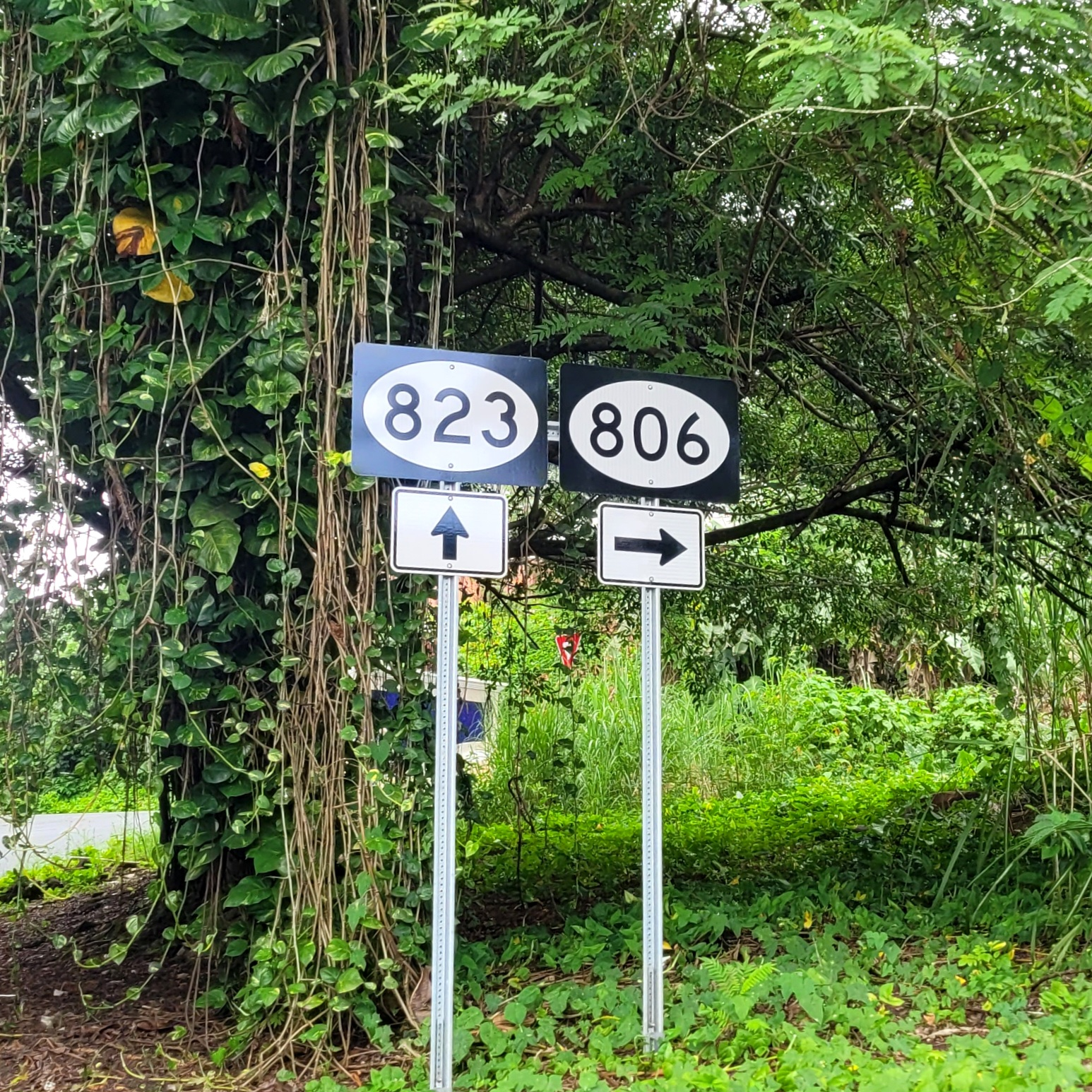
PR-823 east at PR-806 intersection in Toa Alta

Municipality	Location	km	mi	Destinations	Notes
Corozal	Palmarejo–Abras line	0.0	0.0	PR-159 – Corozal, Naranjito, Toa Alta	Southern terminus of PR-806
Toa Alta	Quebrada Arenas	1.9	1.2	PR-823 – Toa Alta, Río Lajas	Northern terminus of PR-806
1.000 mi = 1.609 km; 1.000 km = 0.621 mi
