= List of barrios and sectors of Toa Alta, Puerto Rico =

Like all municipalities of Puerto Rico, Toa Alta is subdivided into administrative units called barrios, which are, in contemporary times, roughly comparable to minor civil divisions, (and means wards or boroughs or neighborhoods in English). The barrios and subbarrios, in turn, are further subdivided into smaller local populated place areas/units called sectores (sectors in English). The types of sectores may vary, from normally sector to urbanización to reparto to barriada to residencial, among others. Some sectors appear in two barrios.

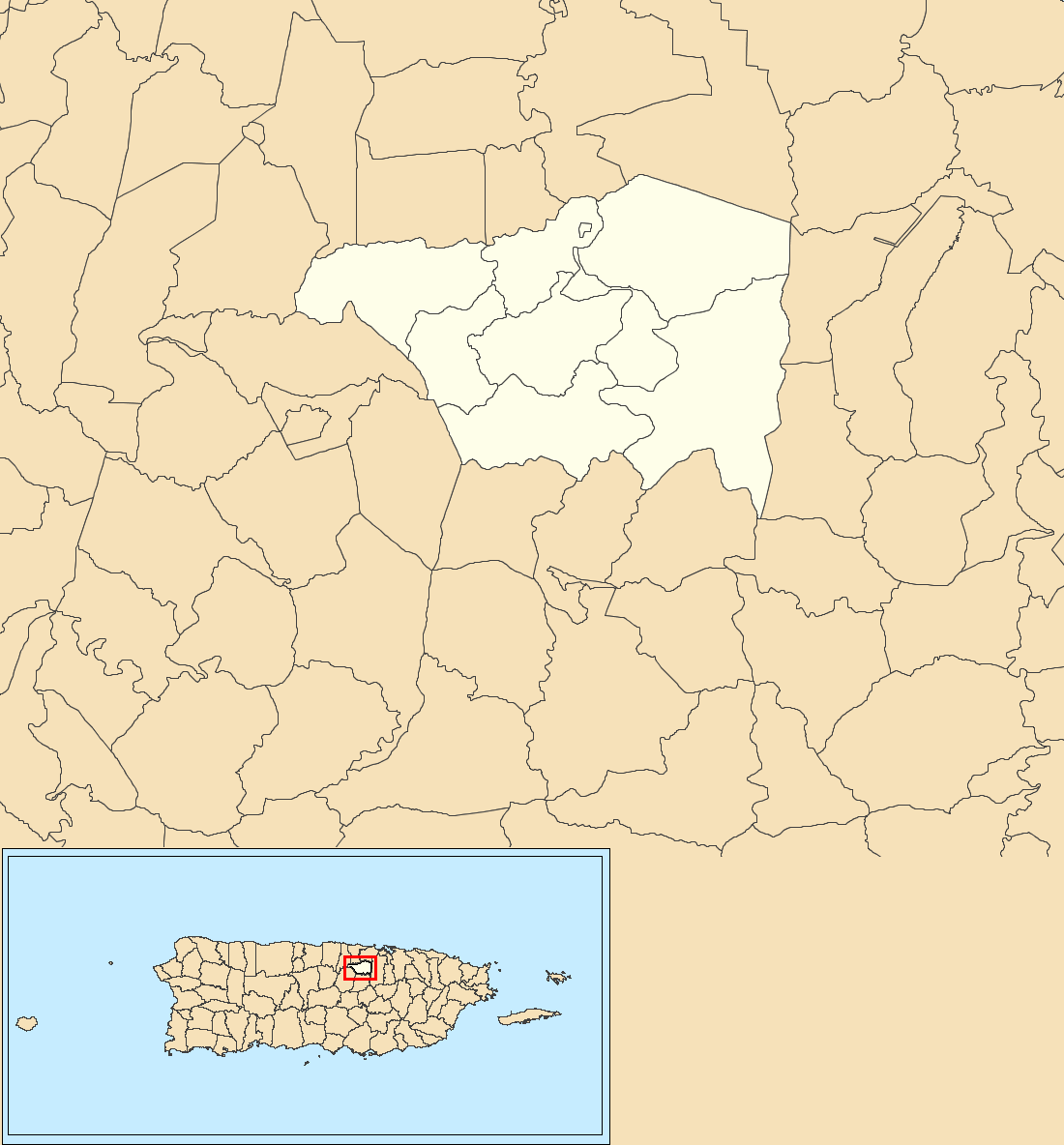
Toa Alta map with barrio subdivisions

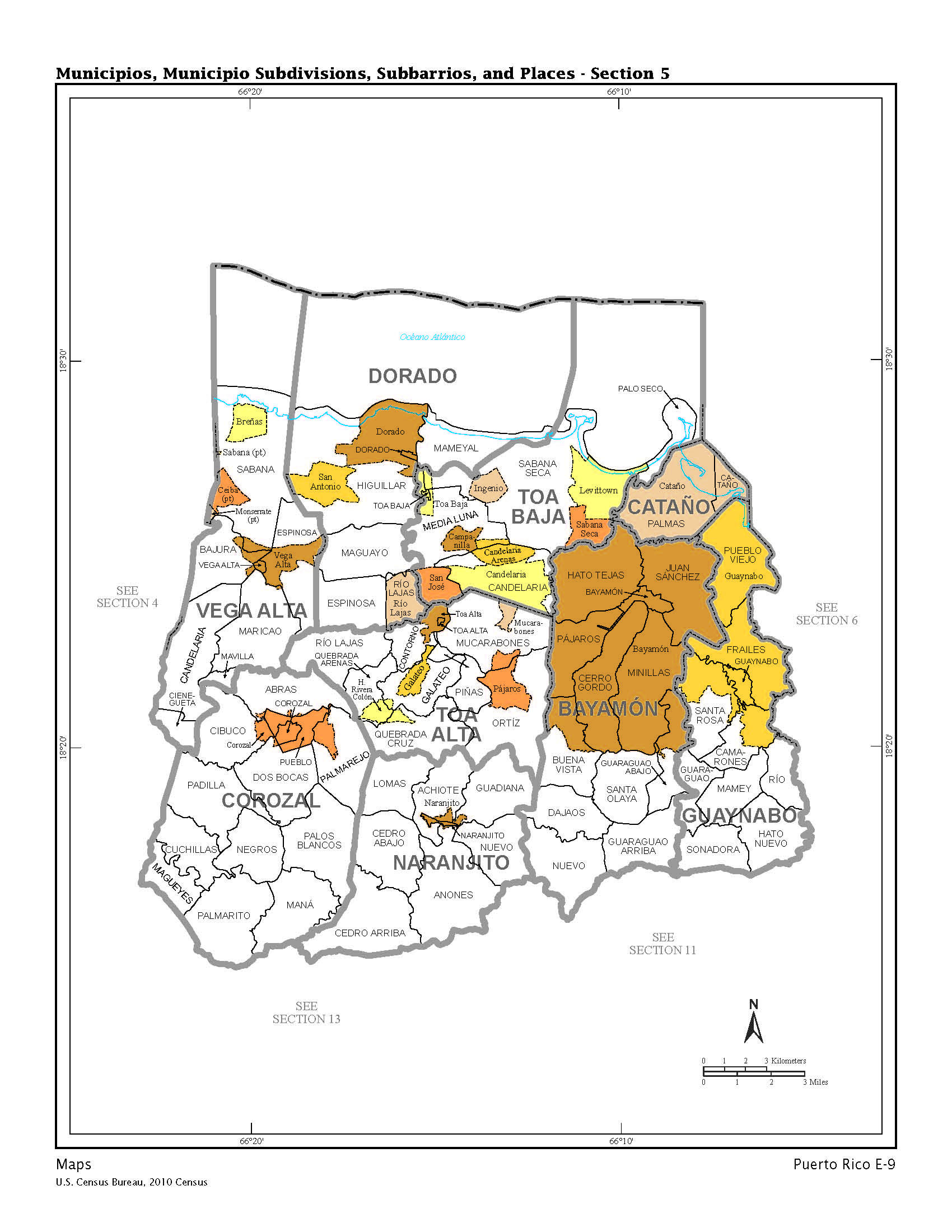
US Census map of Toa Alta and surrounding areas

== List of sectors by barrio ==
=== Contorno ===
- Apartamentos Palacio Dorado
- Reparto Sherly
- Residencial Jardines de San Fernando
- Sector Cielito (Carretera 165)
- Sector Cielo Mar
- Sector El Winche
- Sector Gury
- Sector Rabo del Buey
- Sector Santos
- Urbanización Mansiones del Toa
- Urbanización Quintas Don Juan (Highland Estates)
- Urbanización San Fernando
- Urbanización Town Hills

=== Galateo ===
- Carretera 824
- Parcelas Galateo
- Reparto Las Colinas
- Reparto Los Chalets
- Reparto Luis
- Sector Antonio de Gracia
- Sector Calderón
- Sector Eugenio “Geno” Cosme López
- Sector Galateo Centro
- Sector Gutiérrez
- Sector López
- Sector Loubriel
- Sector Morales
- Sector Ríos
- Sector Rivera
- Sector Rosado
- Sector Vélez
- Sector Villa Josco
- Urbanización Brisas del Plata
- Urbanización Díaz
- Urbanización Green Valley
- Urbanización Haciendas del Toa
- Urbanización Negrón
- Urbanización Piedra Linda
- Urbanización Quintas de José Alberto
- Urbanización Quintas Negrón
- Urbanización Veredas del Río I
- Urbanización Veredas del Río II

=== Mucarabones ===
- Calle 2
- Calle 3
- Comunidad Acerola
- Condominio Alturas de Monte Verde
- Condominio Brisas II
- Condominio Terrazas de Montecasino
- Condominio Vistas de Montecasino
- Parcelas Barrio Mucarabones
- Parcelas Piñas
- Reparto Doraida
- Sector Arenas
- Sector Brisas del Este
- Sector El Turpial
- Sector Jiménez
- Sector La Cuerda
- Sector Las Torres
- Sector Los Frailes
- Sector Morales
- Sector Villa del Río
- Sector Villa Juventud
- Urbanización Alturas de Montecasino
- Urbanización Aventura
- Urbanización Brisas de Montecasino
- Urbanización Casitas de la Fuente
- Urbanización El Rosario
- Urbanización Estancias de La Fuente (Fuente Imperial, Fuente del Valle, Fuente del Condado)
- Urbanización Estancias de San Miguel
- Urbanización Estancias del Plata
- Urbanización Fuente Bella
- Urbanización Hacienda de Boriquén
- Urbanización Haciendas del Caribe
- Urbanización Jardines Casablanca
- Urbanización Jardines de Escorial
- Urbanización Jardines de Mediterráneo
- Urbanización La Inmaculada
- Urbanización Las Cascadas I y II
- Urbanización Madelaine
- Urbanización Mansiones Montecasino I y II
- Urbanización Monte Sol
- Urbanización Monte Verde
- Urbanización Montecasino Heights
- Urbanización Montecasino
- Urbanización Parque San Miguel
- Urbanización Plaza de la Fuente
- Urbanización Pradera del Río
- Urbanización San Pedro
- Urbanización Villa del Monte
- Urbanización Villas del Toa

=== Ortíz ===
- Calle Bienvenida
- Condominio Mirador del Toa
- Condominio Palacios de Versalles
- Condominio Terrazas del Cielo
- Condominio Torres del Plata I y II
- Condominio Veredas de la Reina
- Condominio Vistas del Pinar
- Parcelas Van Scoy
- Urbanización Las Quintas
- Reparto Chinea
- Reparto El Lago
- Reparto La Campiña
- Reparto Valle Verde
- San Raymundo
- San Pedro
- San Gregorio
- San Alfonso
- San Rafael
- Sector Altos de Campeche
- Sector Ayala
- Sector Cabrera
- Sector El Siete
- Sector La Alegría
- Sector La Falcona
- Sector La Marina
- Sector La Prá
- Sector La Rosa
- Sector Los Corozos
- Sector Los Cosme
- Sector Los González
- Sector Los Llanos
- Sector Los Ramos
- Sector Preciosas Vistas del Lago
- Sector Ramos
- Sector Rincón
- Sector Rivas
- Sector Rodríguez Acevedo
- Sector Rodríguez
- Sector Soto
- Sector Verdes Campiñas
- Urbanización Alta Vista
- Urbanización Alturas de Bucarabones
- Urbanización Alturas Río La Plata
- Urbanización Bella Ilusión
- Urbanización Bosque de los Pinos
- Urbanización Brisas del Lago
- Urbanización Campos del Toa
- Urbanización Ciudad Jardín I
- Urbanización Ciudad Jardín II
- Urbanización Colinas De Bayoán
- Urbanización Colinas del Lago
- Urbanización Colinas del Plata
- Urbanización Ciudad Jardín III
- Urbanización Estancias del Toa
- Urbanización Hacienda El Paraíso
- Urbanización Hacienda Vista Real
- Urbanización La Providencia
- Urbanización Los Dominicos
- Urbanización Miraflores
- Urbanización Monte Plata
- Urbanización Montelago Estates
- Urbanización Palacio del Monte
- Urbanización Palacio Imperial
- Urbanización Palacios de Marbella
- Urbanización Palacios del Río I y II
- Urbanización Palacios Reales
- Urbanización Paseo de Alta Vista
- Urbanización Paseos del Plata
- Urbanización Porto Bello
- Urbanización Quintas de San Ramón
- Urbanización Quintas de Santa Ana
- Urbanización Quintas del Plata
- Urbanización Terrazas del Toa
- Urbanización Toa Alta Heights
- Urbanización Toa Linda
- Urbanización Villas Norel

=== Piñas ===
- Reparto La Ponderosa
- Sector Hacienda El Tamarindo
- Sector La Loma
- Sector La Vega
- Sector Las Piedras
- Sector Velilla
- Sector Villa Minier
- Urbanización Arboleda del Plata
- Urbanización Hacienda El Pilar
- Urbanización Wood Bridge Park

=== Quebrada Arenas ===
- Comunidad Las Colinas
- Reparto Carmen
- Reparto Quebrada Arenas
- Sector Cuesta Blanca
- Sector El Trapiche
- Sector Jalda Arriba
- Sector Los Hoyos
- Sector Los Mudos
- Sector Molina
- Sector Villa Arena
- Sector Villa Naí
- Urbanización Hacienda Lidia Marie
- Urbanización Las Villas
- Urbanización Los Árboles
- Urbanización Pérez Rosado
- Urbanización Sun Flowers Valley
- Urbanización Valle Arena

=== Quebrada Cruz ===
- Hacienda María Luisa
- Parcelas Quebrada Cruz
- Reparto León
- Reparto Mariela
- Reparto Monte Claro
- Sector Álvarez
- Sector Brame
- Sector Calderón
- Sector El Cuatro
- Sector El Cuco
- Sector Hacienda Leila
- Sector Hacienda Paola
- Sector La Cuchilla
- Sector Lomas García
- Sector Los Chárriez
- Sector Los Cocos
- Sector Pacheco
- Sector Pastos Comunales
- Sector Pérez
- Sector Proyecto Los Cocos
- Sector Punta Brava
- Sector Sánchez
- Urbanización Colinas del Sol
- Urbanización Hacienda Lumaris
- Urbanización Haciendas del Lago
- Urbanización Los Pinos
- Urbanización Los Silos
- Urbanización Palma Arenas
- Urbanización Pradera del Toa
- Urbanización Quintas de Plaza Aquarium
- Urbanización Santa Cruz
- Urbanización Villa Toa
- Urbanización Vistas de Plaza Aquarium

=== Río Lajas ===
- Calles: Almendro, Cedro, Bambú, Deloniz, Guayacán, Higüero, Laurel, Jacaranda, Kamani, India Laurel, Maga, Níspero, Ébano, Potones, Ceiba, Ibisco
- Sector Jazmín
- Sector La Cuchilla
- Sector Marrero
- Sector Marzán
- Sector Nilo
- Sector Rivera
- Sector Ayala
- Sector Rufo Rodríguez
- Urbanización Haciendas de Dorado
- Urbanización Valle del Paraíso
- Urbanización Vista del Río I
- Urbanización Vista del Río III

=== Toa Alta barrio-pueblo ===
- Calle Alfonso XIII
- Calle Antonio López
- Calle Barceló
- Calle Cuba Libre
- Calle José de Diego
- Calle Marina
- Calle Muñoz Rivera
- Calle Palmer
- Calle Ponce de León
- Residencial Piñas
- Residencial Ramón Pérez
- Sector San José (El Manantial)
- Urbanización Alturas del Toa
- Urbanización Gran Vista
- Urbanización Jardines de Toa Alta
- Urbanización Jardines del Toa
- Urbanización San José
- Urbanización Villa Amparo
- Urbanización Villa María
- Urbanización Villa Matilde

== See also ==
- List of communities in Puerto Rico
