= Quebrada Cruz =

Barrio of Toa Alta, Puerto Rico

- Barrio
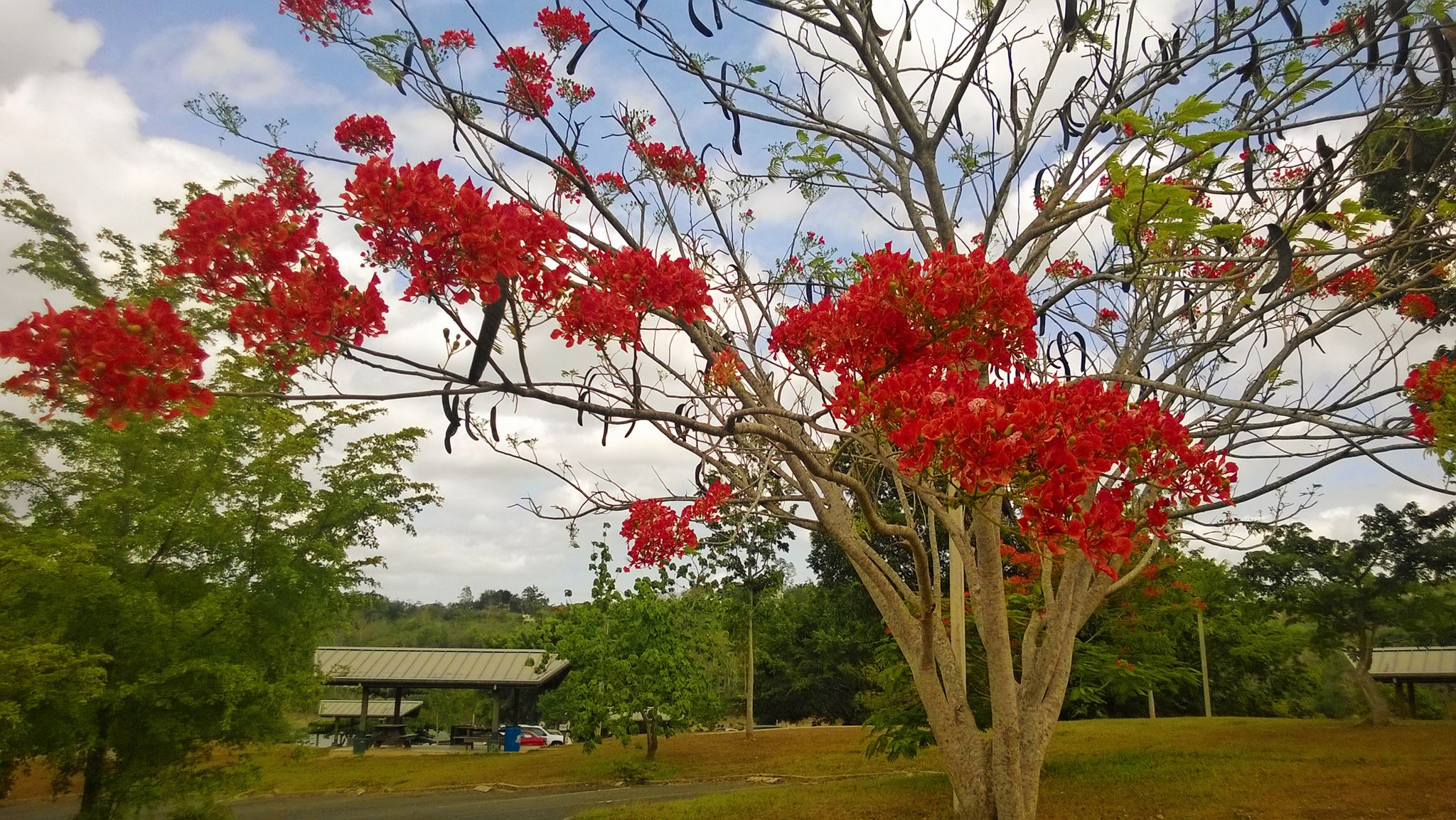
- Refugio de Vida Silvestre del Embalse La Plata in Quebrada Cruz

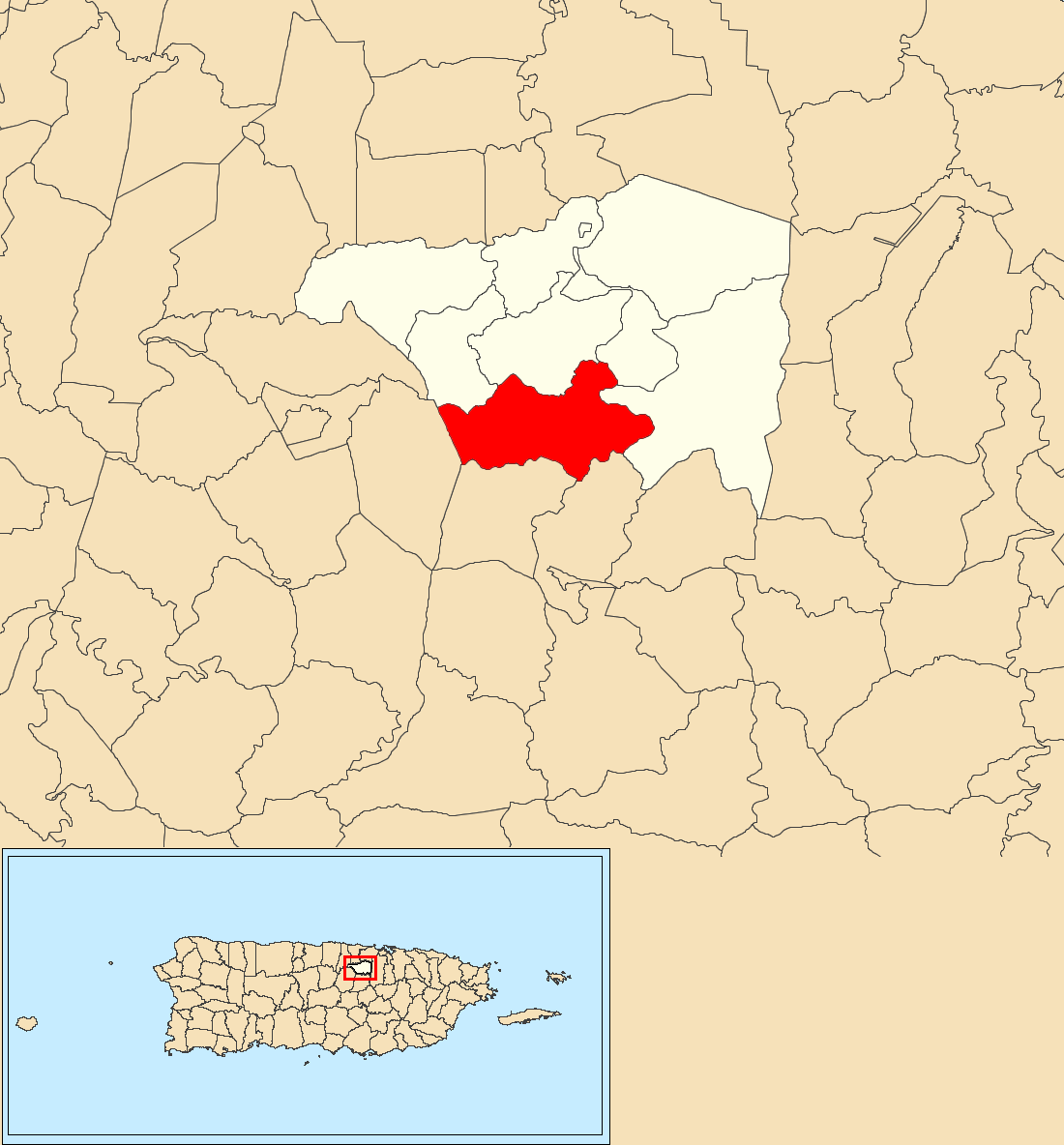
- Location of Quebrada Cruz within the municipality of Toa Alta shown in red

- Location of Puerto Rico
- Coordinates: 18°20′24″N 66°15′27″W
- Commonwealth: Puerto Rico
- Municipality: Toa Alta

Area
  - Total: 3.72 sq mi (9.6 km^{2})
  - Land: 3.60 sq mi (9.3 km^{2})
  - Water: 0.12 sq mi (0.31 km^{2})
- Elevation: 436 ft (133 m)

Population (2010)
  - Total: 5,343
  - Density: 1,484.2/sq mi (573.1/km^{2})
- Source: 2010 Census
- Time zone: UTC−4 (AST)

Quebrada Cruz is a barrio in the municipality of Toa Alta, Puerto Rico. Its population in 2010 was 5,343 living in over 30 sectors.

Historical population
Census	Pop.	Note	%±
1900	1,665		—
1910	1,367		−17.9%
1920	1,369		0.1%
1930	1,579		15.3%
1940	1,750		10.8%
1950	2,189		25.1%
1960	2,286		4.4%
1970	2,483		8.6%
1980	2,747		10.6%
1990	4,183		52.3%
2000	5,051		20.8%
2010	5,343		5.8%
U.S. Decennial Census; 1899 (shown as 1900) 1910-1930; 1930-1950 1980-2000 2010

== History ==
Quebrada Cruz was in Spain's gazetteers until Puerto Rico was ceded by Spain in the aftermath of the Spanish–American War under the terms of the Treaty of Paris of 1898 and became an unincorporated territory of the United States. In 1899, the United States Department of War conducted a census of Puerto Rico finding that the population of Quebrada Cruz barrio was 1,665.

== Sectors ==
Barrios (which are, in contemporary times, roughly comparable to minor civil divisions) in turn are further subdivided into smaller local populated place areas/units called sectores (sectors in English). The types of sectores may vary, from normally sector to urbanización to reparto to barriada to residencial, among others.

The following sectors are in Quebrada Cruz barrio:

Hacienda María Luisa, Parcelas Quebrada Cruz, Reparto León, Reparto Mariela, Reparto Monte Claro, Sector Álvarez, Sector Brame, Sector Calderón, Sector El Cuatro, Sector El Cuco, Sector Hacienda Leila, Sector Hacienda Paola, Sector La Cuchilla, Sector Lomas García, Sector Los Chárriez, Sector Los Cocos, Sector Pacheco, Sector Pastos Comunales, Sector Pérez, Sector Proyecto Los Cocos, Sector Punta Brava, Sector Sánchez, Urbanización Colinas del Sol, Urbanización Hacienda Lumaris, Urbanización Haciendas del Lago, Urbanización Los Pinos, Urbanización Los Silos, Urbanización Palma Arenas, Urbanización Pradera del Toa, Urbanización Quintas de Plaza Aquarium, Urbanización Santa Cruz, Urbanización Villa Toa, and Urbanización Vistas de Plaza Aquarium.

== Gallery ==
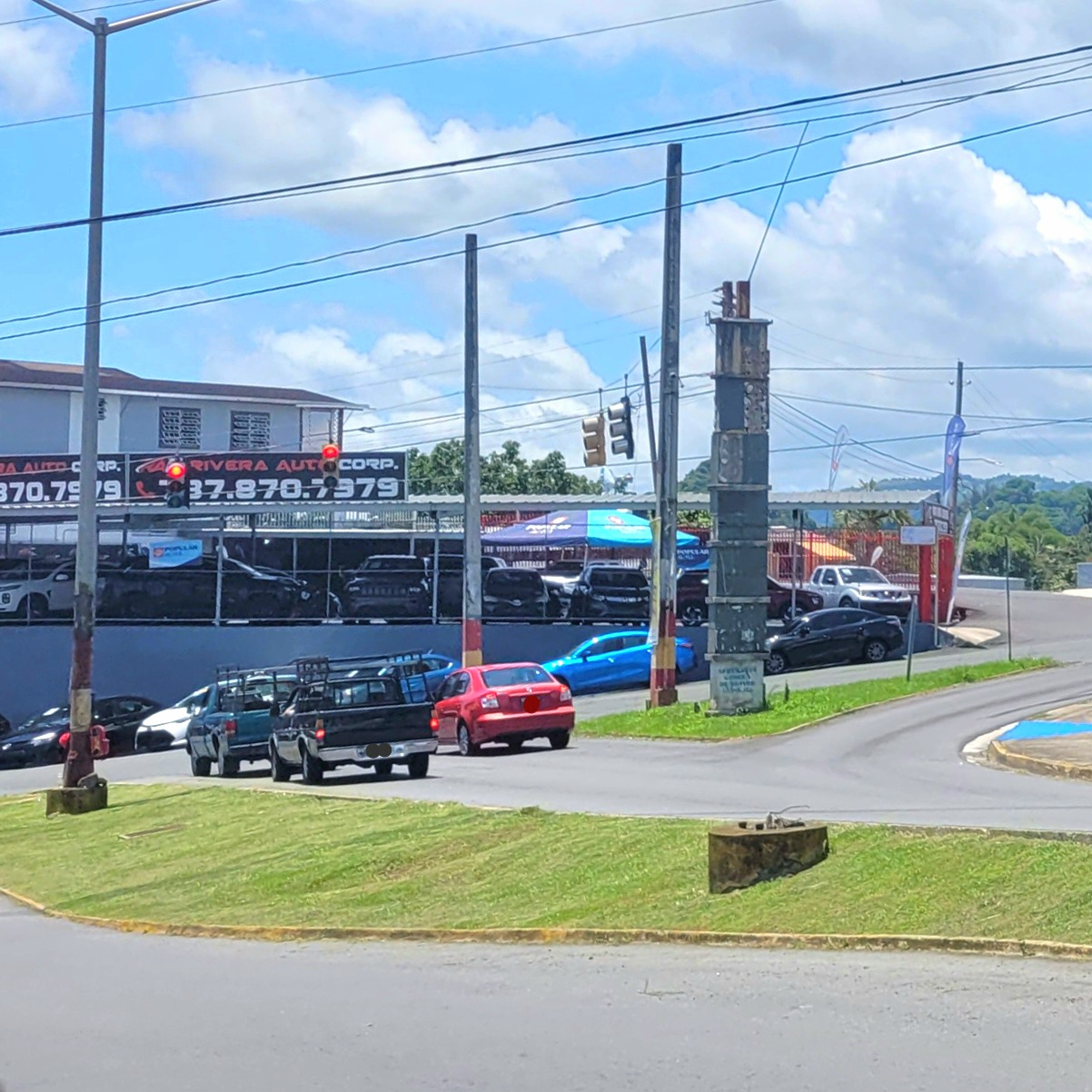
Eastern terminus of Puerto Rico Highway 159 between Quebrada Arenas and Quebrada Cruz

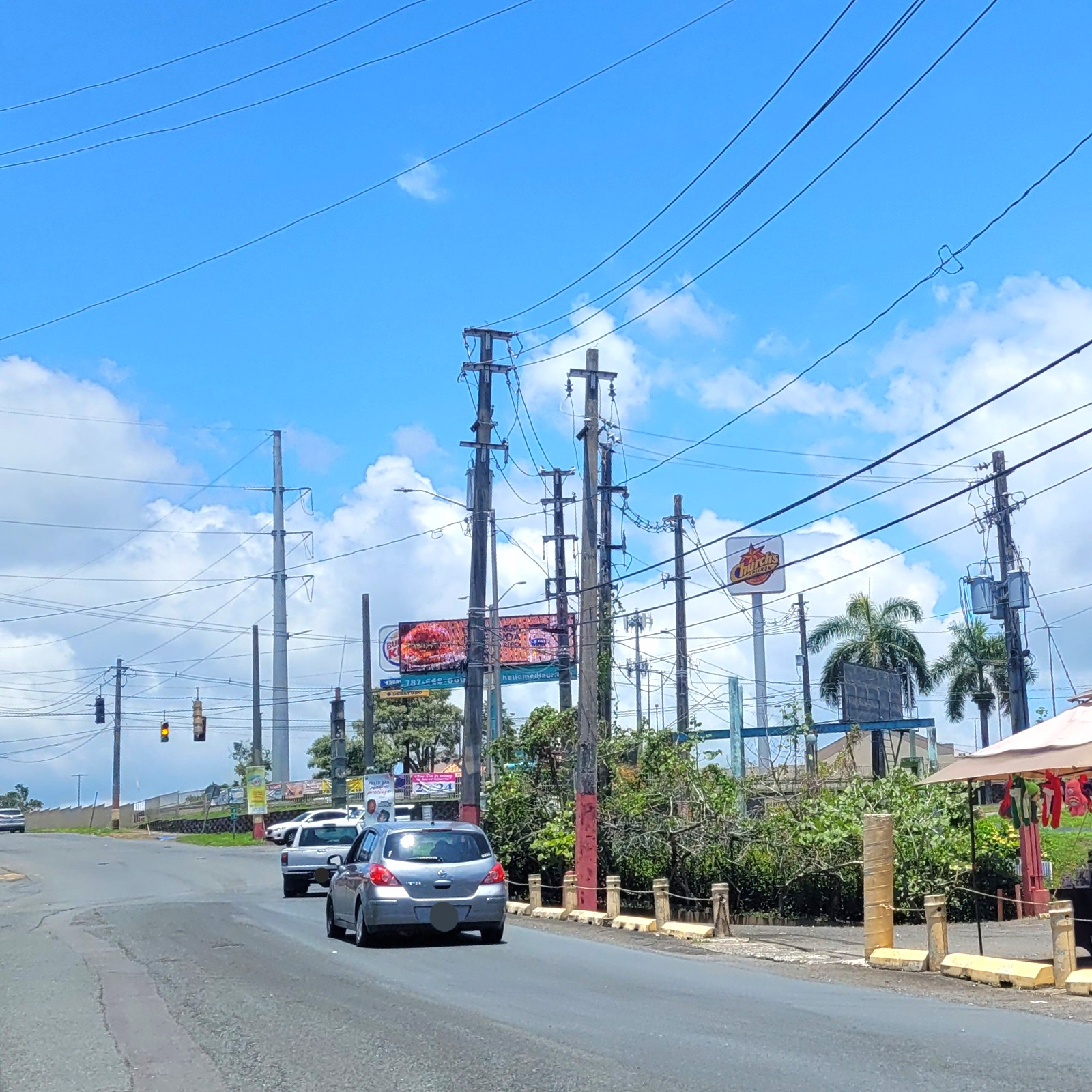
Puerto Rico Highway 165 between Quebrada Cruz and Quebrada Arenas, looking south

== See also ==
- List of communities in Puerto Rico
- List of barrios and sectors of Toa Alta, Puerto Rico
