= Luis Collazo Rivera =

Puerto Rican politician

Luis "Jumbo" Collazo

Mayor of Toa Alta
- In office January 14, 2005 – January 13, 2013
- Preceded by: Rafael López González
- Succeeded by: Clemente Agosto

Personal details
- Party: New Progressive Party (PNP)

Luis "Jumbo" Collazo Rivera is a Puerto Rican politician and former mayor of Toa Alta. Collazo is affiliated with the New Progressive Party (PNP) and served as mayor from 2005 to 2013.
