= Clemente Agosto =

Puerto Rican politician (born 1974)

Mayor of Toa Alta
- Incumbent
- Assumed office January 14, 2013
- Preceded by: Luis Collazo Rivera

Personal details
- Born: November 6, 1974 (age 51)
- Party: Popular Democratic Party (PPD)
- Education: Interamerican University of Puerto Rico

Clemente "Chito" Agosto (born in November 6, 1974) is a Puerto Rican politician and the current mayor of Toa Alta. Agosto is affiliated with the Popular Democratic Party (PPD) and has served as mayor since 2013.

Agosto has an associate degree in Business Administration from the Interamerican University of Puerto Rico. He started his professional career as an entrepreneur, and was owner of various restaurants.
