= Toa Alta barrio-pueblo =

Historical and administrative center (seat) of Toa Alta, Puerto Rico

Toa Alta barrio-pueblo Pueblo de Toa Alta
- Municipality Seat
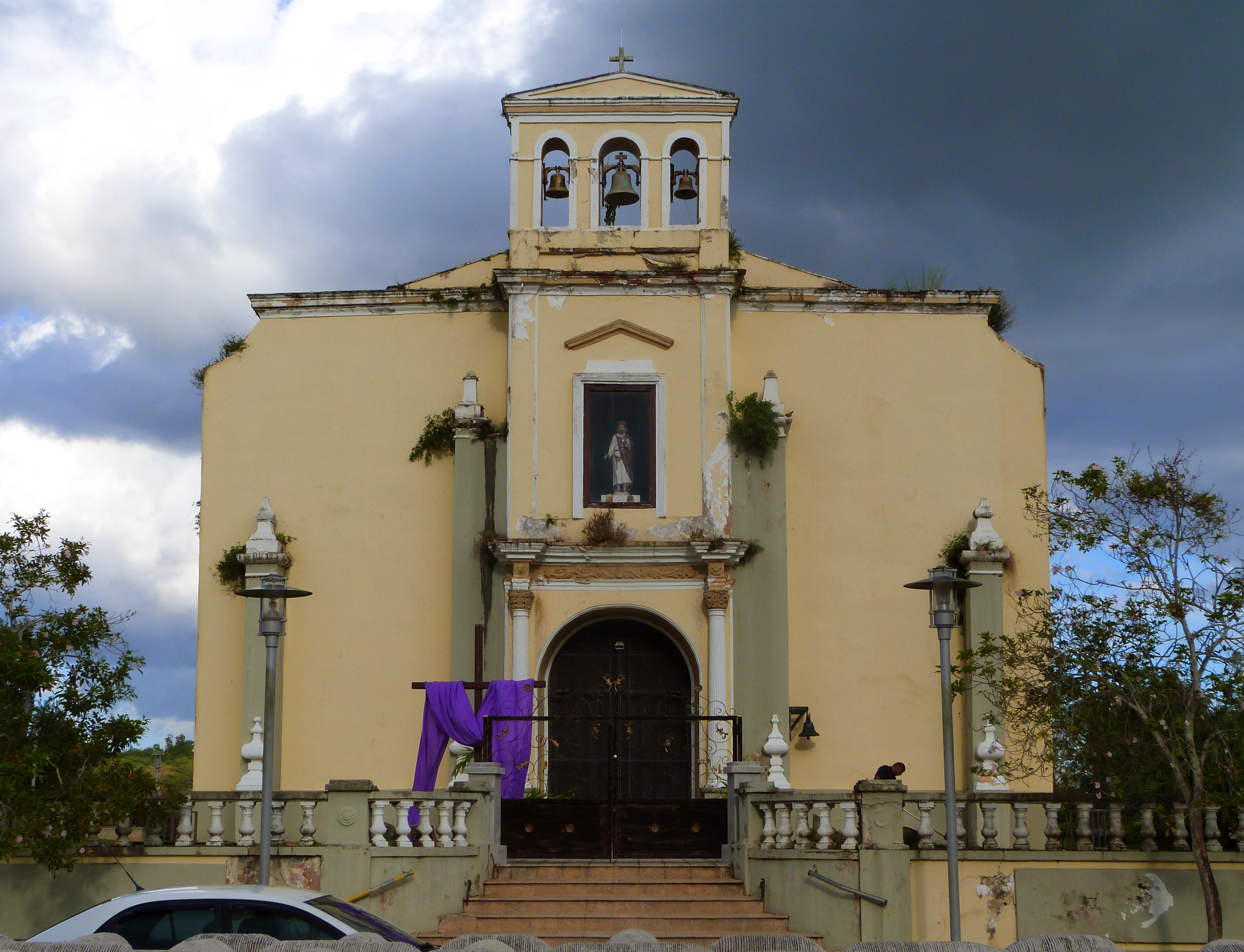
- Parroquia San Fernando Rey in Toa Alta barrio-pueblo

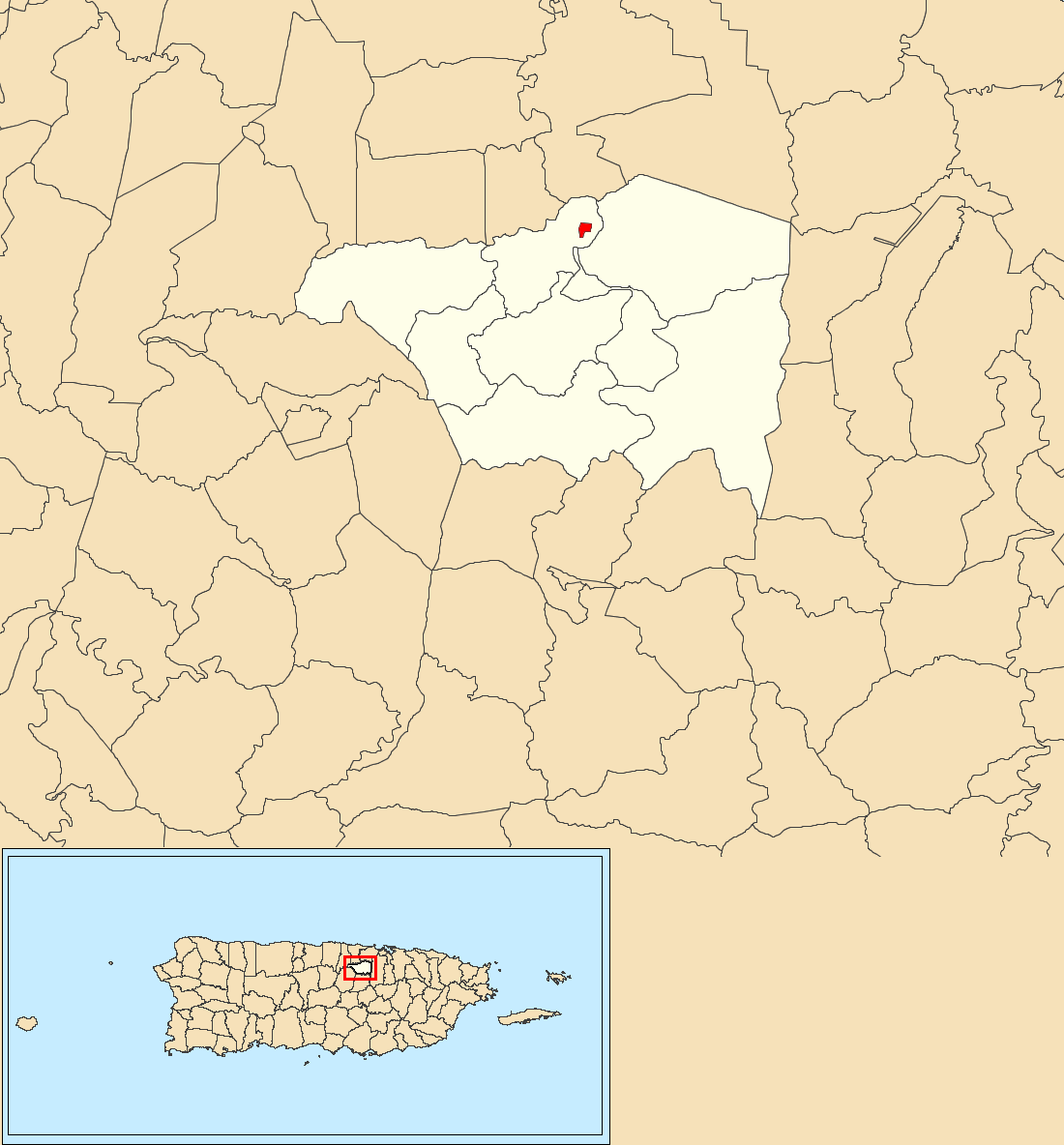
- Location of Toa Alta barrio-pueblo within the municipality of Toa Alta shown in red

- Location of Puerto Rico
- Coordinates: 18°23′16″N 66°14′52″W
- Commonwealth: Puerto Rico
- Municipality: Toa Alta

Area
  - Total: 0.03 sq mi (0.078 km^{2})
  - Land: 0.03 sq mi (0.078 km^{2})
  - Water: 0 sq mi (0 km^{2})
- Elevation: 69 ft (21 m)

Population (2010)
  - Total: 397
  - Density: 13,233.3/sq mi (5,109.4/km^{2})
- Source: 2010 Census
- Time zone: UTC−4 (AST)

Toa Alta barrio-pueblo is a barrio and the administrative center (seat) of Toa Alta, a municipality of Puerto Rico. Its population in 2010 was 397.

As was customary in Spain, in Puerto Rico, the municipality has a barrio called pueblo which contains a central plaza, the municipal buildings (city hall), and a Catholic church. Fiestas patronales (patron saint festivals) are held in the central plaza every year.

Historical population
| Census | Pop. | Note | %± |
|---|---|---|---|
| 1900 | 991 | | — |
| 1910 | 905 | | −8.7% |
| 1920 | 1,172 | | 29.5% |
| 1930 | 1,203 | | 2.6% |
| 1940 | 1,091 | | −9.3% |
| 1950 | 1,392 | | 27.6% |
| 1960 | 1,284 | | −7.8% |
| 1970 | 0 | | −100.0% |
| 1980 | 841 | | — |
| 1990 | 776 | | −7.7% |
| 2000 | 715 | | −7.9% |
| 2010 | 397 | | −44.5% |
U.S. Decennial Census; 1899 (shown as 1900) 1910-1930; 1930-1950 1980-2000 2010

== The central plaza and its church ==
The central plaza, or square, is a place for official and unofficial recreational events and a place where people can gather and socialize from dusk to dawn. The Laws of the Indies, Spanish law, which regulated life in Puerto Rico in the early 19th century, stated the plaza's purpose was for "the parties" (celebrations, festivities) (Spanish: a propósito para las fiestas), and that the square should be proportionally large enough for the number of neighbors (Spanish: grandeza proporcionada al número de vecinos). These Spanish regulations also stated that the streets nearby should be comfortable portals for passersby, protecting them from the elements: sun and rain.

Located across the central plaza in Toa Alta barrio-pueblo is the Parroquia San Fernando Rey, a Roman Catholic church, which was built between 1752 and 1826.

== History ==
Toa Alta barrio-pueblo was in Spain's gazetteers until Puerto Rico was ceded by Spain in the aftermath of the Spanish–American War under the terms of the Treaty of Paris of 1898 and became an unincorporated territory of the United States. In 1899, the United States Department of War conducted a census of Puerto Rico finding that the population of Pueblo barrio was 991.

== Sectors ==
Barrios (which are, in contemporary times, roughly comparable to minor civil divisions) in turn are further subdivided into smaller local populated place areas/units called sectores (sectors in English). The types of sectores may vary, from normally sector to urbanización to reparto to barriada to residencial, among others.

The following sectors are in Toa Alta barrio-pueblo:

Calle Alfonso XIII, Calle Antonio López, Calle Barceló, Calle Cuba Libre, Calle José de Diego, Calle Marina, Calle Muñoz Rivera, Calle Palmer, Calle Ponce de León, Residencial Piñas, Residencial Ramón Pérez, Sector San José (El Manantial), Urbanización Alturas del Toa, Urbanización Gran Vista, Urbanización Jardines de Toa Alta, Urbanización Jardines del Toa, Urbanización San José, Urbanización Villa Amparo, Urbanización Villa María, and Urbanización Villa Matilde.

== See also ==
- List of communities in Puerto Rico
- List of barrios and sectors of Toa Alta, Puerto Rico
