= Galateo, Toa Alta, Puerto Rico =

Barrio of Puerto Rico

Galateo
- Barrio
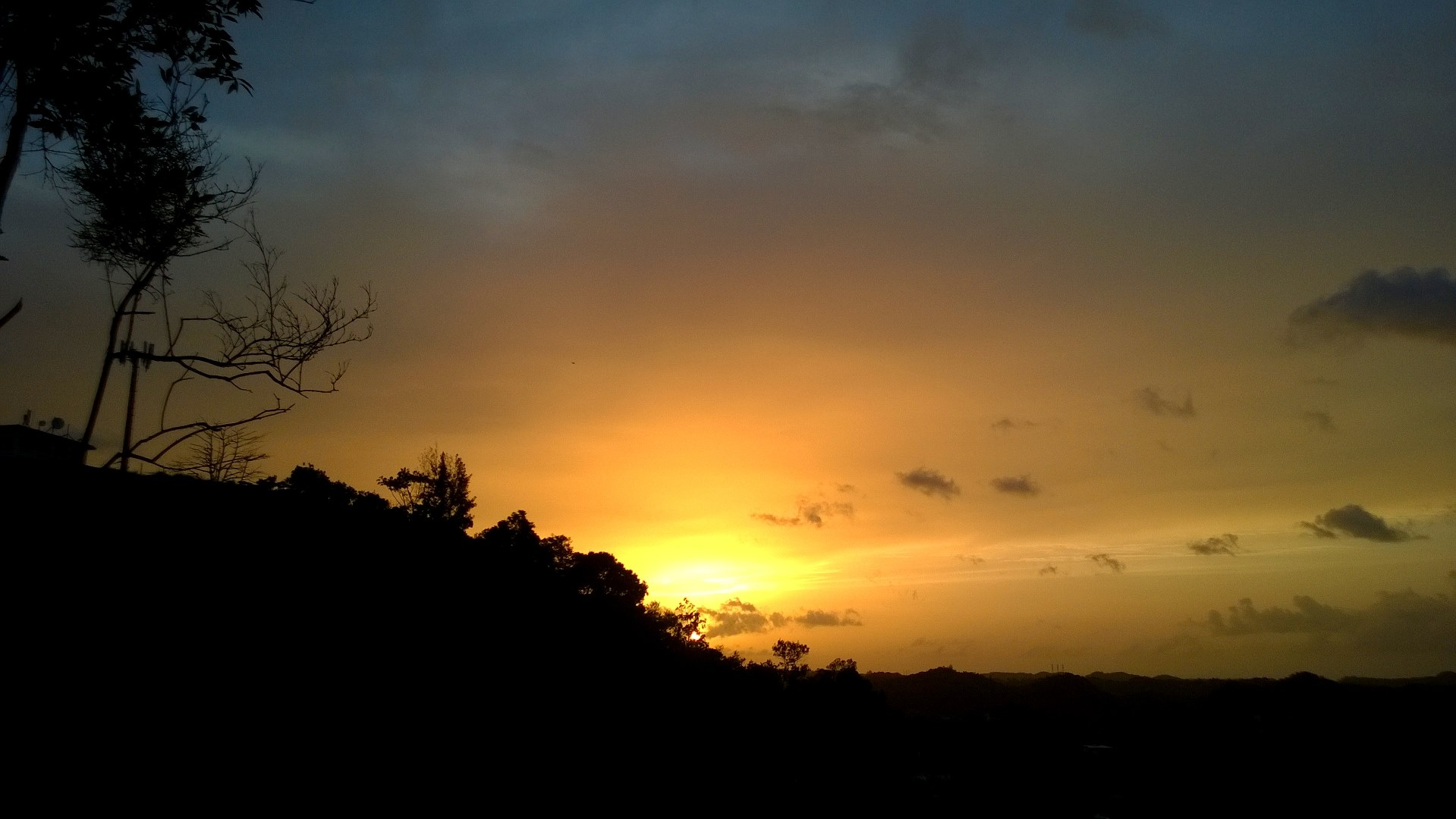
- Sunset from Galateo

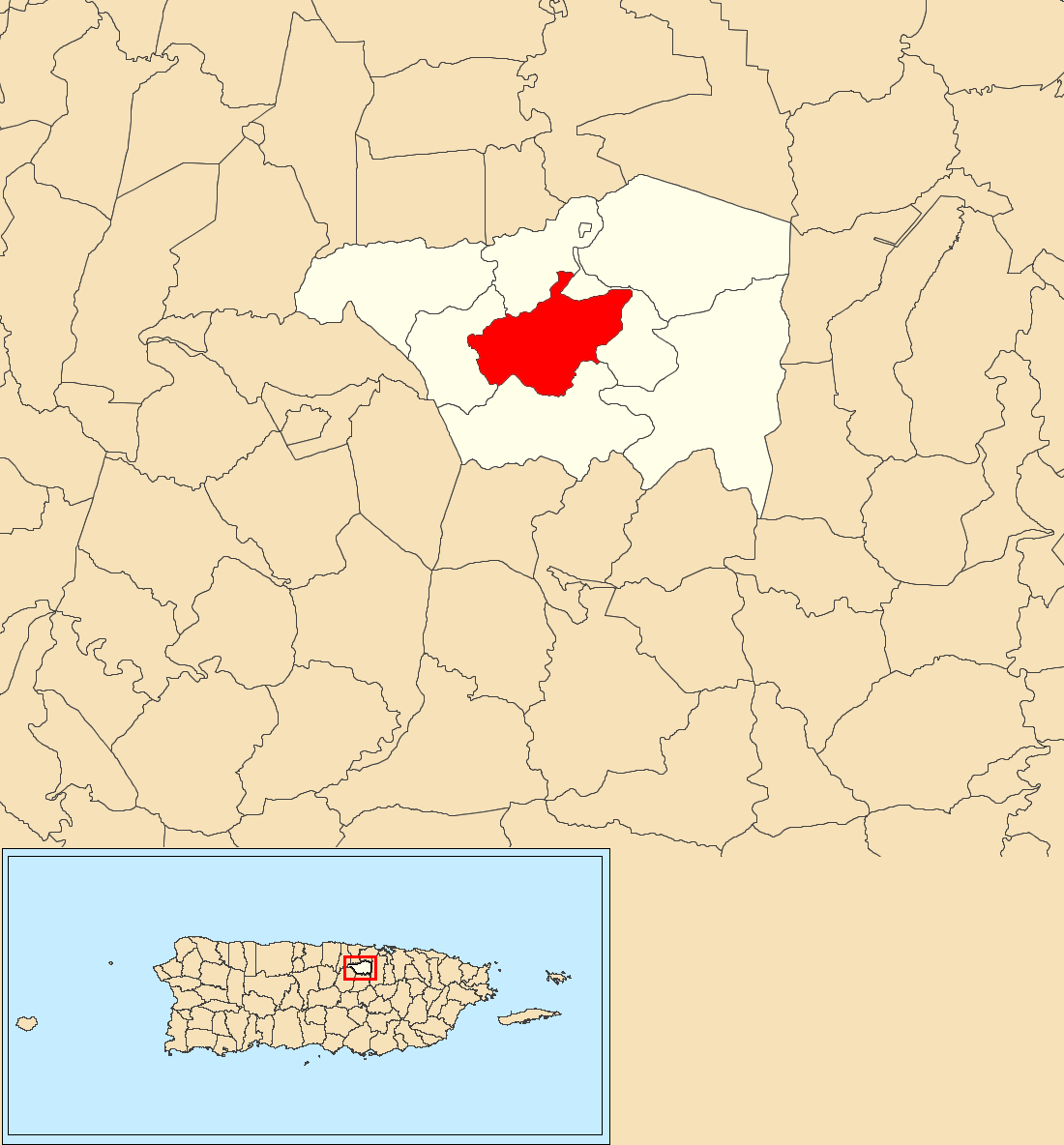
- Location of Galateo within the municipality of Toa Alta shown in red

- Location of Puerto Rico
- Coordinates: 18°21′39″N 66°15′05″W
- Commonwealth: Puerto Rico
- Municipality: Toa Alta

Area
  - Total: 2.81 sq mi (7.3 km^{2})
  - Land: 2.79 sq mi (7.2 km^{2})
  - Water: 0.02 sq mi (0.052 km^{2})
- Elevation: 66 ft (20 m)

Population (2010)
  - Total: 5,917
  - Density: 2,120.8/sq mi (818.8/km^{2})
- Source: 2010 Census
- Time zone: UTC−4 (AST)

Galateo is a barrio in the municipality of Toa Alta, Puerto Rico. Its population in 2010 was 5,917.

Historical population
Census	Pop.	Note	%±
1900	606		—
1910	950		56.8%
1920	1,035		8.9%
1930	1,249		20.7%
1940	1,488		19.1%
1950	1,484		−0.3%
1960	1,803		21.5%
1970	2,307		28.0%
1980	3,745		62.3%
1990	4,262		13.8%
2000	5,296		24.3%
2010	5,917		11.7%
U.S. Decennial Census; 1899 (shown as 1900) 1910-1930; 1930-1950 1980-2000 2010

== History ==
Galateo was in Spain's gazetteers until Puerto Rico was ceded by Spain in the aftermath of the Spanish–American War under the terms of the Treaty of Paris of 1898 and became an unincorporated territory of the United States. In 1899, the United States Department of War conducted a census of Puerto Rico finding that the population of Galateo barrio was 606.

== Sectors ==
Barrios (which are, in contemporary times, roughly comparable to minor civil divisions) in turn are further subdivided into smaller local populated place areas/units called sectores (sectors in English). The types of sectores may vary, from normally sector to urbanización to reparto to barriada to residencial, among others.

The following sectors are in Galateo barrio:

Carretera 824, Parcelas Galateo, Reparto Las Colinas, Reparto Los Chalets, Reparto Luis, Sector Antonio de Gracia, Sector Calderón, Sector Eugenio “Geno” Cosme López, Sector Galateo Centro, Sector Gutiérrez, Sector López, Sector Loubriel, Sector Morales, Sector Ríos, Sector Rivera, Sector Rosado, Sector Vélez, Sector Villa Josco, Urbanización Brisas del Plata, Urbanización Díaz, Urbanización Green Valley, Urbanización Haciendas del Toa, Urbanización Negrón, Urbanización Piedra Linda, Urbanización Quintas de José Alberto, Urbanización Quintas Negrón, Urbanización Veredas del Río I, and Urbanización Veredas del Río II.

== Gallery ==
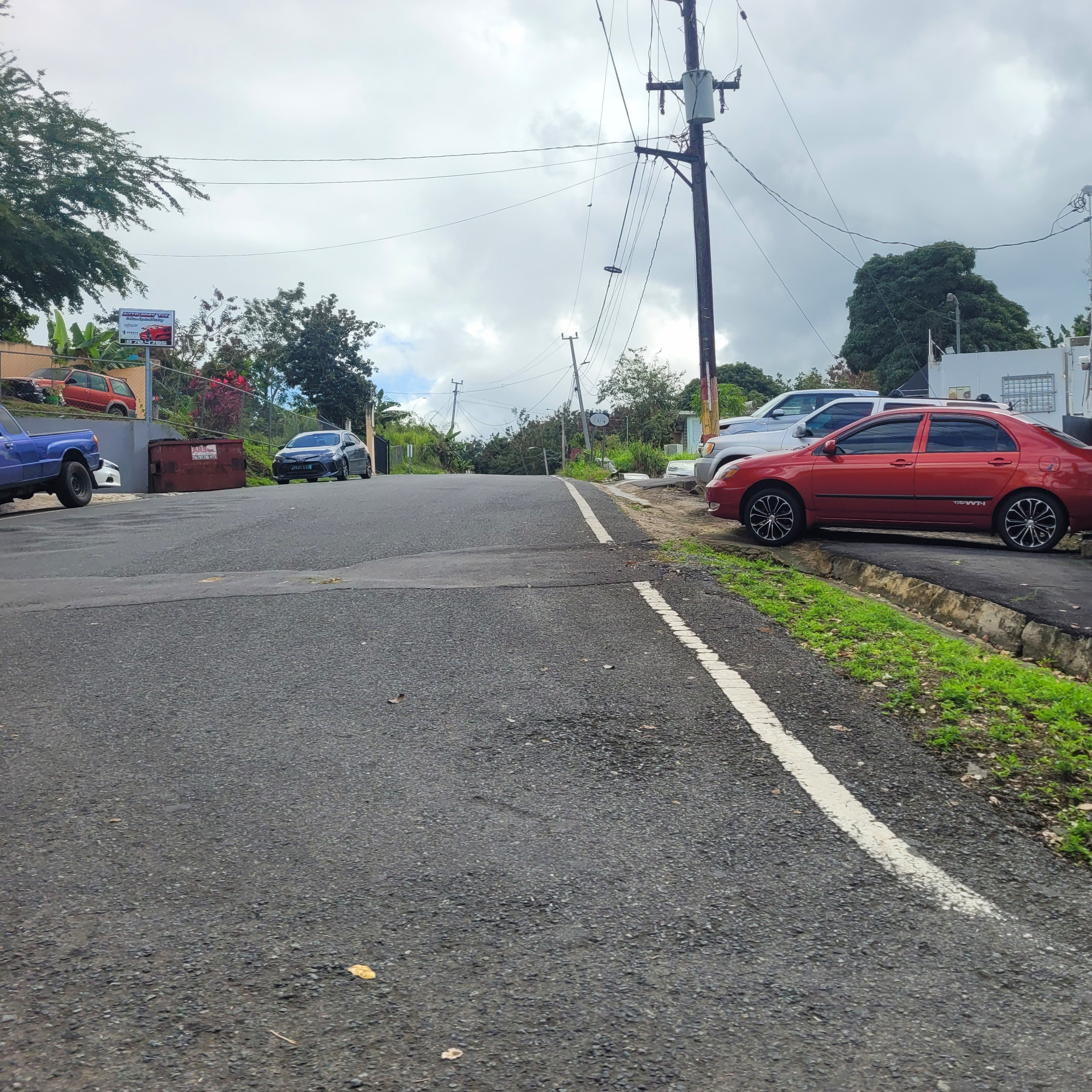
Puerto Rico Highway 804 in Galateo

== See also ==
- List of communities in Puerto Rico
- List of barrios and sectors of Toa Alta, Puerto Rico
