= Piñas, Toa Alta, Puerto Rico =

Barrio of Puerto Rico

Piñas
- Barrio
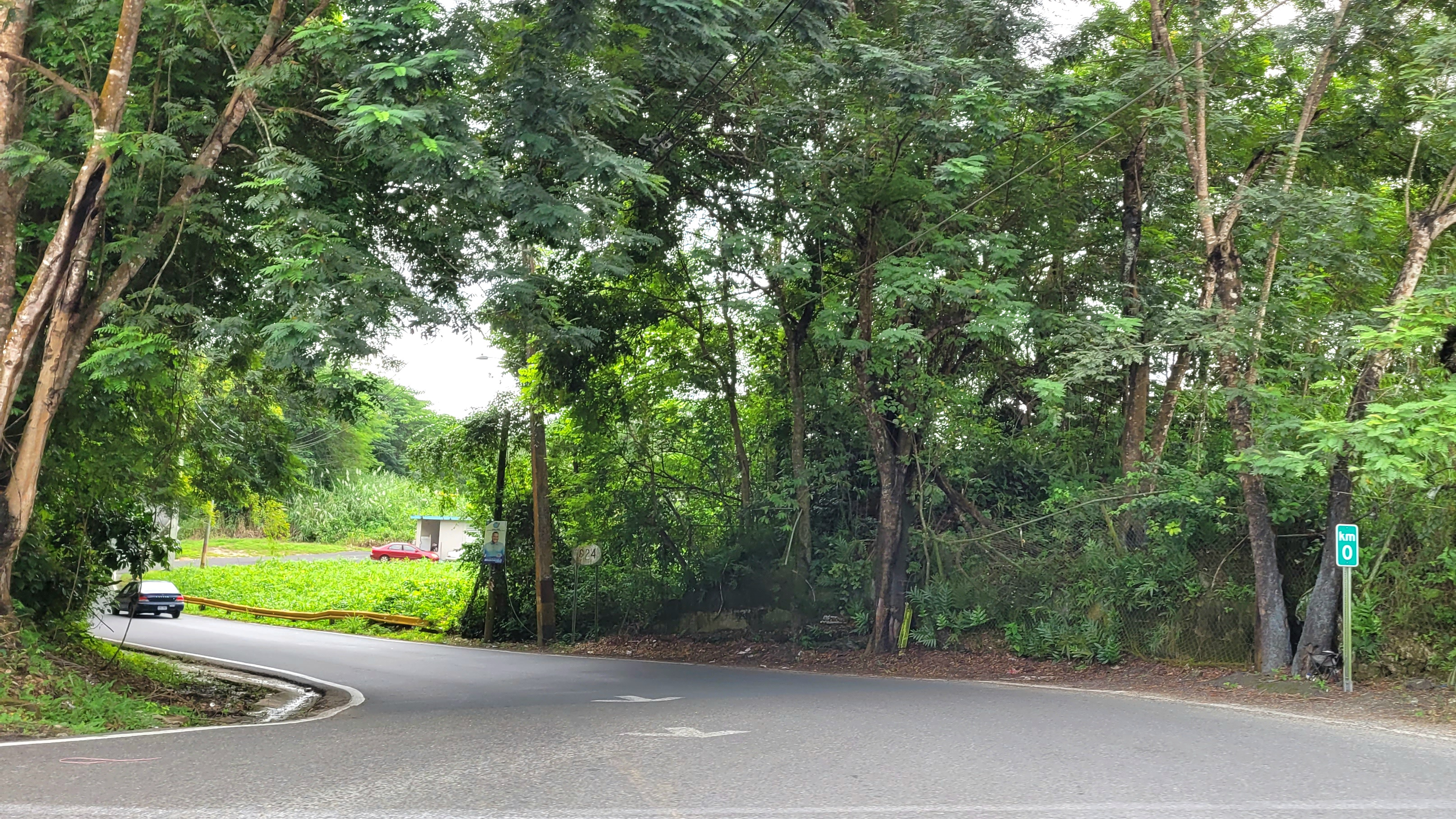
- Puerto Rico Highway 824 in Piñas

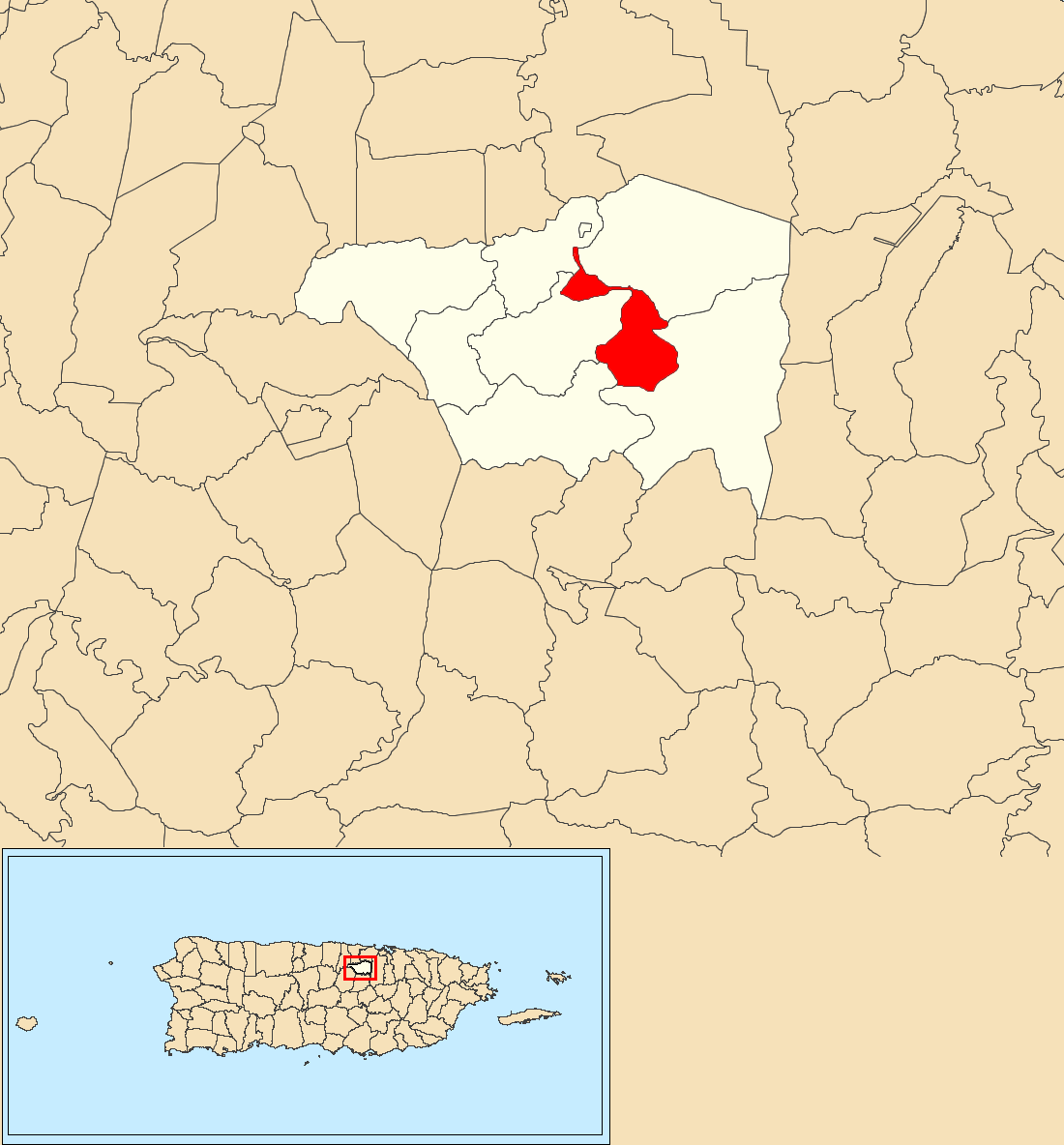
- Location of Piñas within the municipality of Toa Alta shown in red

- Location of Puerto Rico
- Coordinates: 18°21′57″N 66°14′06″W
- Commonwealth: Puerto Rico
- Municipality: Toa Alta

Area
  - Total: 1.59 sq mi (4.1 km^{2})
  - Land: 1.51 sq mi (3.9 km^{2})
  - Water: 0.08 sq mi (0.21 km^{2})
- Elevation: 98 ft (30 m)

Population (2010)
  - Total: 1,354
  - Density: 896.7/sq mi (346.2/km^{2})
- Source: 2010 Census
- Time zone: UTC−4 (AST)

Piñas is a barrio in the municipality of Toa Alta, Puerto Rico. Its population in 2010 was 1,354.

Historical population
Census	Pop.	Note	%±
1900	841		—
1910	981		16.6%
1920	1,053		7.3%
1930	1,300		23.5%
1940	1,630		25.4%
1950	316		−80.6%
1960	507		60.4%
1970	446		−12.0%
1980	585		31.2%
1990	867		48.2%
2000	1,076		24.1%
2010	1,354		25.8%
U.S. Decennial Census; 1899 (shown as 1900) 1910-1930; 1930-1950 1980-2000 2010

== History ==
Piñas was in Spain's gazetteers until Puerto Rico was ceded by Spain in the aftermath of the Spanish–American War under the terms of the Treaty of Paris of 1898 and became an unincorporated territory of the United States. In 1899, the United States Department of War conducted a census of Puerto Rico finding that the population of Piñas barrio was 841.

== Sectors ==
Barrios (which are, in contemporary times, roughly comparable to minor civil divisions) in turn are further subdivided into smaller local populated place areas/units called sectores (sectors in English). The types of sectores may vary, from normally sector to urbanización to reparto to barriada to residencial, among others.

The following sectors are in Piñas barrio:

Reparto La Ponderosa, Sector Hacienda El Tamarindo, Sector La Loma, Sector La Vega, Sector Las Piedras, Sector Velilla, Sector Villa Minier, Urbanización Arboleda del Plata, Urbanización Hacienda El Pilar, and Urbanización Wood Bridge Park.

== See also ==
- List of communities in Puerto Rico
- List of barrios and sectors of Toa Alta, Puerto Rico
