= Ortíz, Toa Alta, Puerto Rico =

Barrio of Puerto Rico

Ortíz
- Barrio
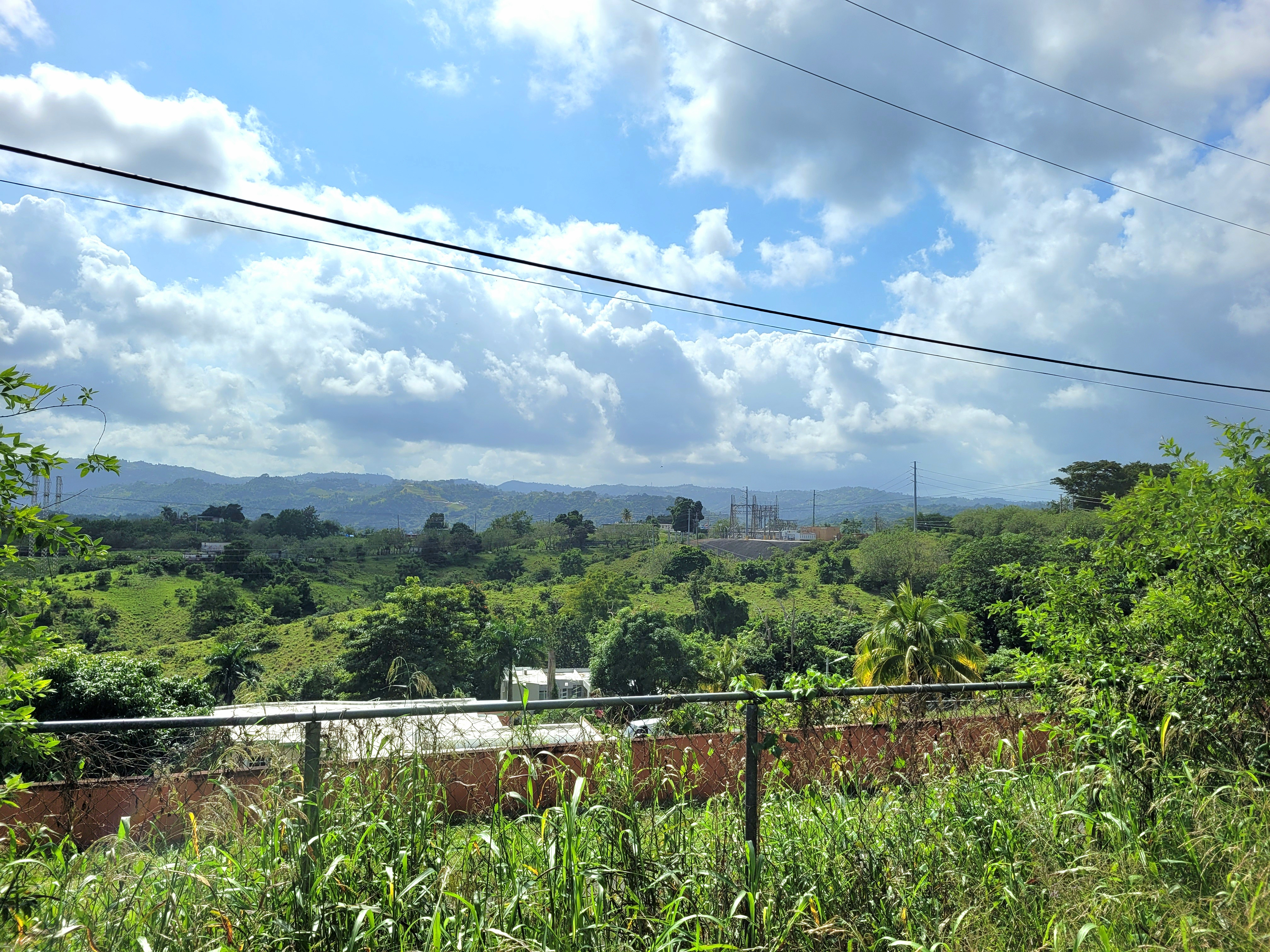
- Mountains from Ortiz

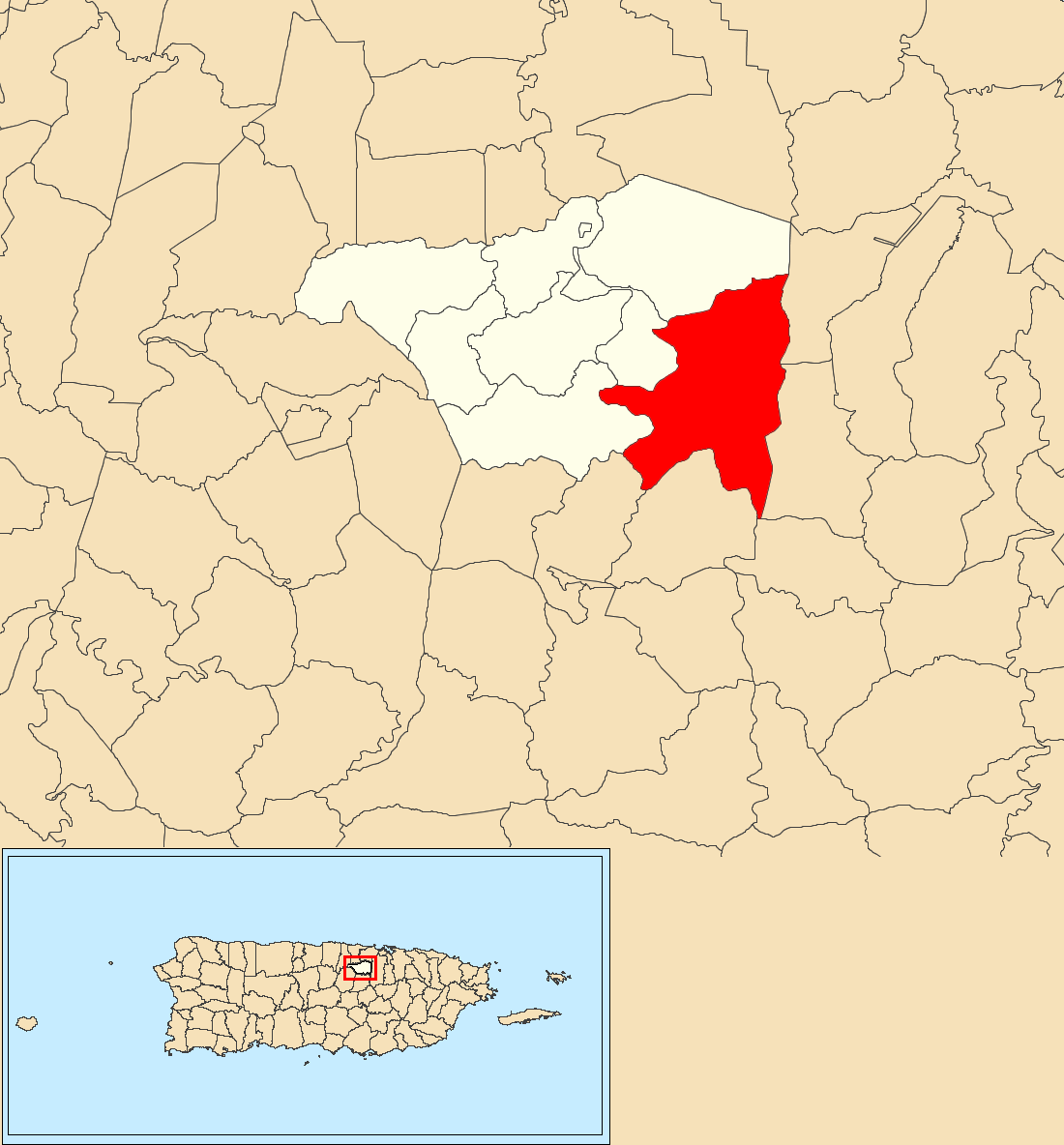
- Location of Ortíz within the municipality of Toa Alta shown in red

- Location of Puerto Rico
- Coordinates: 18°20′54″N 66°12′57″W
- Commonwealth: Puerto Rico
- Municipality: Toa Alta

Area
  - Total: 6.43 sq mi (16.7 km^{2})
  - Land: 6.15 sq mi (15.9 km^{2})
  - Water: 0.28 sq mi (0.73 km^{2})
- Elevation: 354 ft (108 m)

Population (2010)
  - Total: 26,580
  - Density: 4,314.9/sq mi (1,666.0/km^{2})
- Source: 2010 Census
- Time zone: UTC−4 (AST)

Ortíz is a large barrio in the municipality of Toa Alta, Puerto Rico. Its population in 2010 was 26,580.

Historical population
Census	Pop.	Note	%±
1900	948		—
1910	946		−0.2%
1920	992		4.9%
1930	1,082		9.1%
1940	1,231		13.8%
1950	2,621		112.9%
1960	2,706		3.2%
1970	3,012		11.3%
1980	8,105		169.1%
1990	15,760		94.4%
2000	21,850		38.6%
2010	26,580		21.6%
U.S. Decennial Census; 1899 (shown as 1900) 1910-1930; 1930-1950 1980-2000 2010

== History ==
Ortíz was in Spain's gazetteers until Puerto Rico was ceded by Spain in the aftermath of the Spanish–American War under the terms of the Treaty of Paris of 1898 and became an unincorporated territory of the United States. In 1899, the United States Department of War conducted a census of Puerto Rico finding that the population of Ortíz barrio was 948.

== Sectors ==
Barrios (which are, in contemporary times, roughly comparable to minor civil divisions) in turn are further subdivided into smaller local populated place areas/units called sectores (sectors in English). The types of sectores may vary, from normally sector to urbanización to reparto to barriada to residencial, among others.

The following sectors are in Ortíz barrio:

Calle Bienvenida (calle 5 interior), Condominio Mirador del Toa, Condominio Palacios de Versalles, Condominio Terrazas del Cielo, Condominio Torres del Plata I y II, Condominio Veredas de la Reina, Condominio Vistas del Pinar, Parcelas Van Scoy (Calles: 3 Oeste, Ricardo Ramos, Andino, Colón), Urbanización Las Quintas, Reparto Chinea, Reparto El Lago, Reparto La Campiña, Reparto Valle Verde, San Raymundo, San Pedro, San Gregorio, San Alfonso, San Rafael, Sector Altos de Campeche, Sector Ayala, Sector Cabrera, Sector El Siete, Sector La Alegría, Sector La Falcona, Sector La Marina, Sector La Prá, Sector La Rosa, Sector Los Corozos, Sector Los Cosme, Sector Los González, Sector Los Llanos, Sector Los Ramos, Sector Preciosas Vistas del Lago, Sector Ramos, Sector Rincón, Sector Rivas, Sector Rodríguez Acevedo, Sector Rodríguez, Sector Soto, Sector Verdes Campiñas, Urbanización Alta Vista, Urbanización Alturas de Bucarabones, Urbanización Alturas Río La Plata, Urbanización Bella Ilusión, Urbanización Bosque de los Pinos, Urbanización Brisas del Lago, Urbanización Campos del Toa, Urbanización Ciudad Jardín I, Urbanización Ciudad Jardín II, Urbanización Colinas De Bayoán, Urbanización Colinas del Lago, Urbanización Colinas del Plata, Urbanización Ciudad Jardín III, Urbanización Estancias del Toa, Urbanización Hacienda El Paraíso, Urbanización Hacienda Vista Real, Urbanización La Providencia, Urbanización Los Dominicos (Calles: Santo Tomás de Aquino, San Agustín, San Mateo, San Francisco), Urbanización Miraflores, Urbanización Monte Plata, Urbanización Montelago Estates, Urbanización Palacio del Monte, Urbanización Palacio Imperial, Urbanización Palacios de Marbella, Urbanización Palacios del Río I y II, Urbanización Palacios Reales, Urbanización Paseo de Alta Vista, Urbanización Paseos del Plata, Urbanización Porto Bello, Urbanización Quintas de San Ramón, Urbanización Quintas de Santa Ana, Urbanización Quintas del Plata, Urbanización Terrazas del Toa, Urbanización Toa Alta Heights, Urbanización Toa Linda, and Urbanización Villas Norel.

== Gallery ==
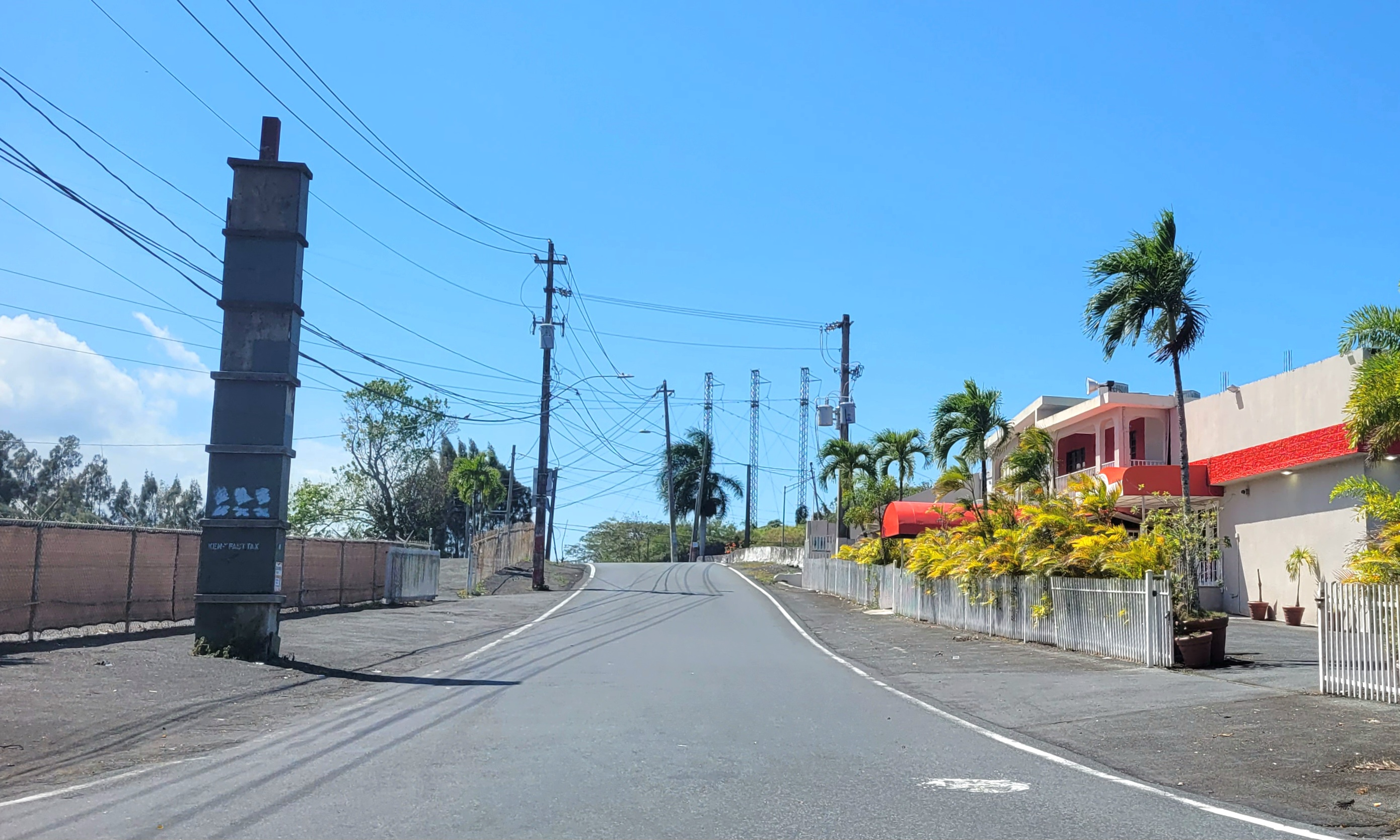
Puerto Rico Highway 827 in Ortiz

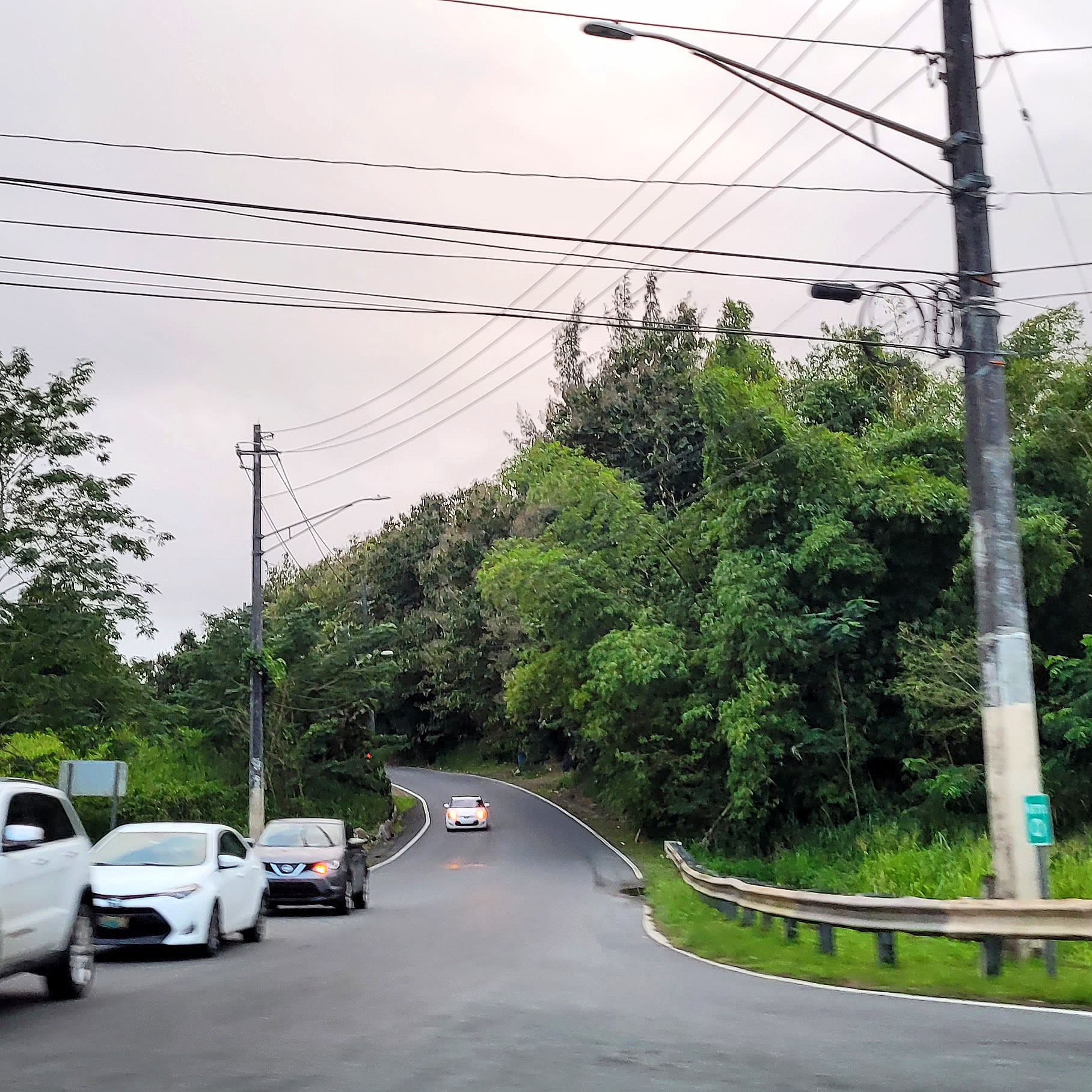
Puerto Rico Highway 829 in Ortiz

== See also ==
- List of communities in Puerto Rico
- List of barrios and sectors of Toa Alta, Puerto Rico
