= Quebrada Arenas, Toa Alta, Puerto Rico =

Barrio of Puerto Rico

Quebrada Arenas
- Barrio
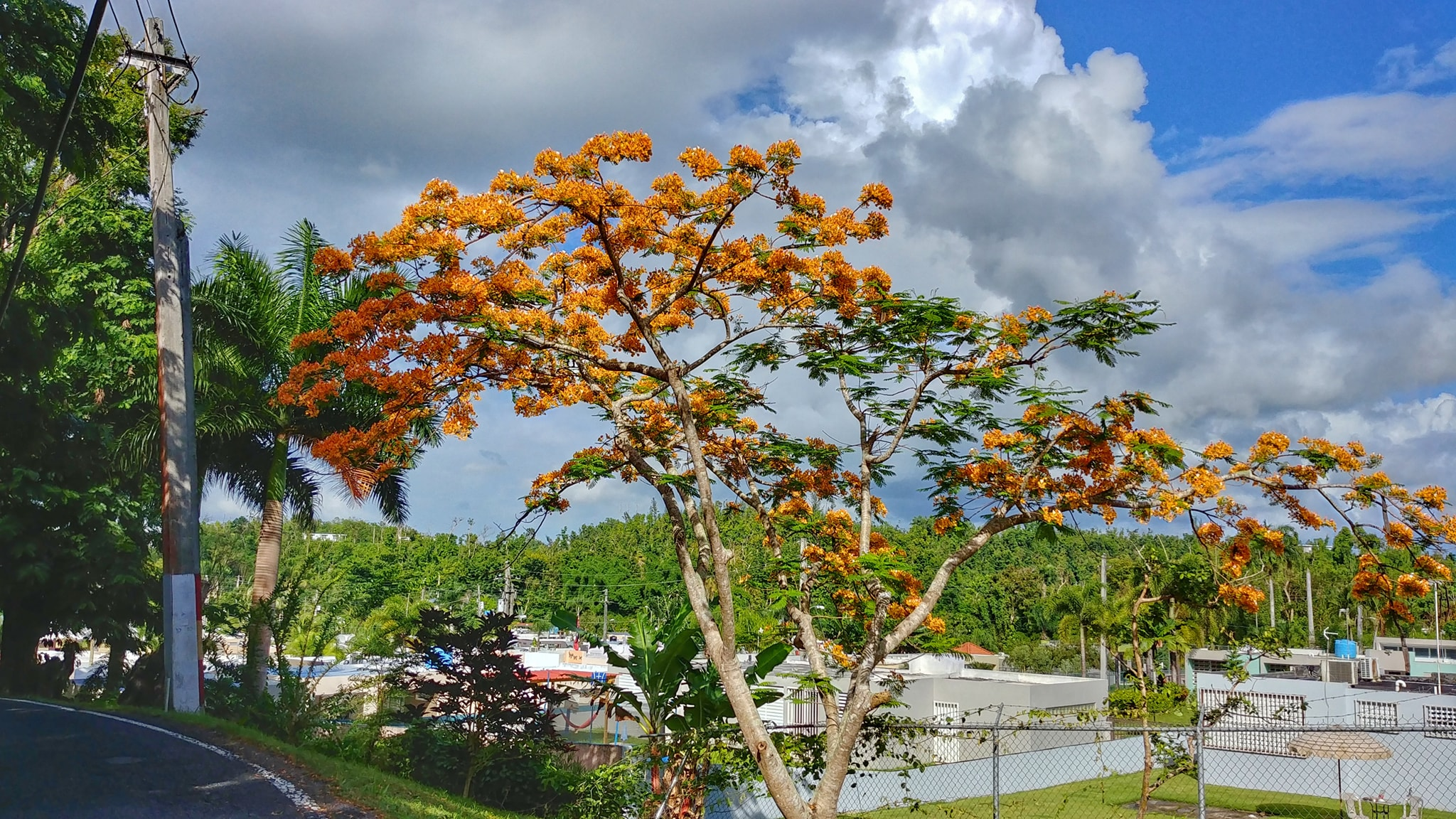
- Flowered flamboyant in Quebrada Arenas

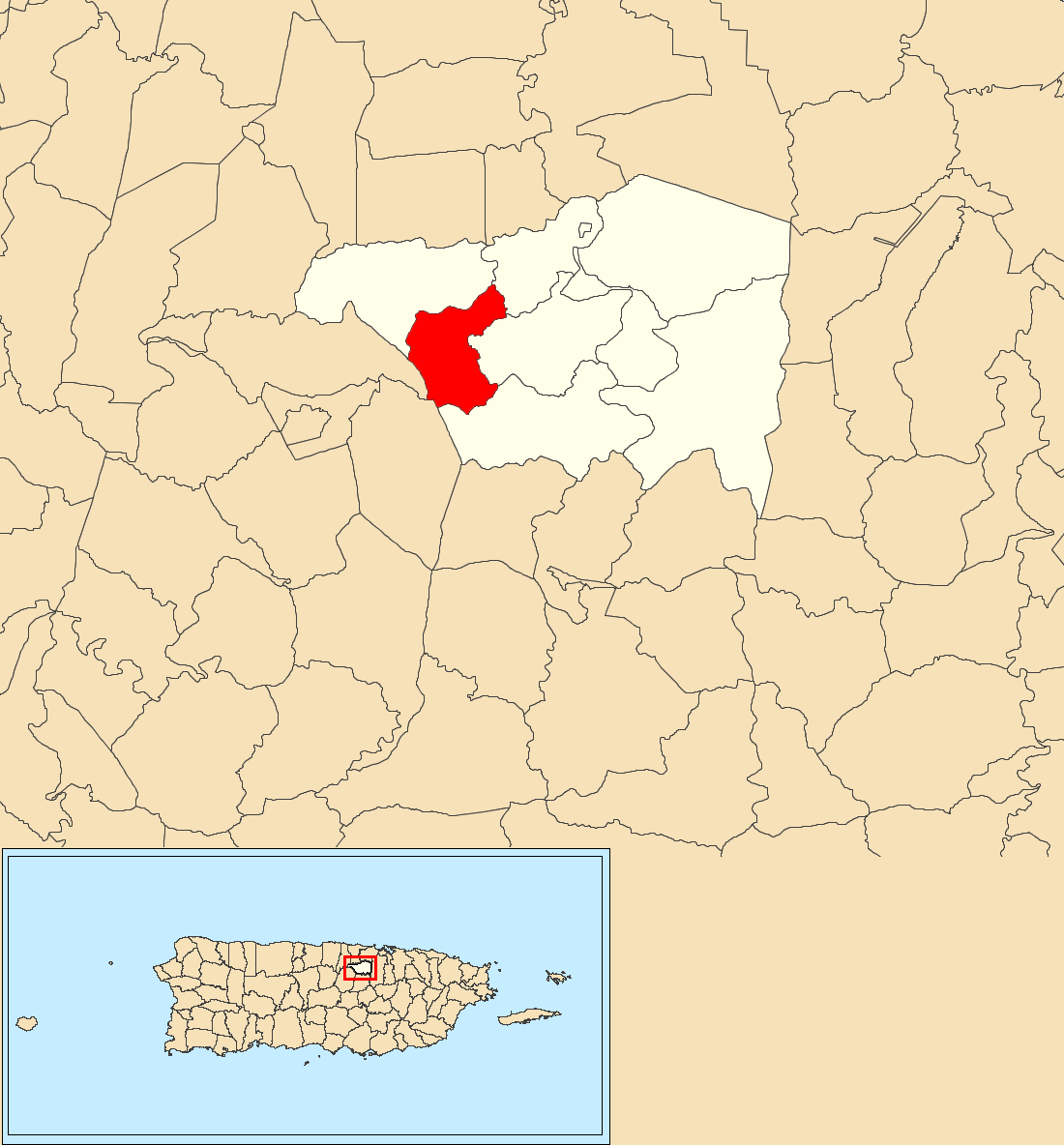
- Location of Quebrada Arenas within the municipality of Toa Alta shown in red

- Location of Puerto Rico
- Coordinates: 18°21′27″N 66°16′47″W
- Commonwealth: Puerto Rico
- Municipality: Toa Alta

Area
  - Total: 1.94 sq mi (5.0 km^{2})
  - Land: 1.94 sq mi (5.0 km^{2})
  - Water: 0 sq mi (0 km^{2})
- Elevation: 427 ft (130 m)

Population (2010)
  - Total: 3,951
  - Density: 2,036.6/sq mi (786.3/km^{2})
- Source: 2010 Census
- Time zone: UTC−4 (AST)

Quebrada Arenas is a barrio in the municipality of Toa Alta, Puerto Rico. Its population in 2010 was 3,951.

Historical population
Census	Pop.	Note	%±
1900	777		—
1910	1,031		32.7%
1920	1,378		33.7%
1930	1,147		−16.8%
1940	1,075		−6.3%
1950	1,189		10.6%
1960	1,083		−8.9%
1970	2,111		94.9%
1980	2,333		10.5%
1990	2,419		3.7%
2000	3,600		48.8%
2010	3,951		9.8%
U.S. Decennial Census; 1899 (shown as 1900) 1910-1930; 1930-1950 1980-2000 2010

== History ==
Quebrada Arenas was in Spain's gazetteers until Puerto Rico was ceded by Spain in the aftermath of the Spanish–American War under the terms of the Treaty of Paris of 1898 and became an unincorporated territory of the United States. In 1899, the United States Department of War conducted a census of Puerto Rico finding that the population of Quebrada Arenas barrio was 777.

Quebrada Arenas saw a 48.8% increase in population from 1990 to 2000 and a 9.8% increase from 2000 to 2010.

== Sectors ==
Barrios (which are, in contemporary times, roughly comparable to minor civil divisions) in turn are further subdivided into smaller local populated place areas/units called sectores (sectors in English). The types of sectores may vary, from normally sector to urbanización to reparto to barriada to residencial, among others.

The following sectors are in Quebrada Arenas barrio:

Comunidad Las Colinas, Reparto Carmen, Reparto Quebrada Arenas, Sector Cuesta Blanca, Sector El Trapiche, Sector Jalda Arriba, Sector Los Hoyos, Sector Los Mudos, Sector Molina, Sector Villa Arena, Sector Villa Naí, Urbanización Hacienda Lidia Marie, Urbanización Las Villas, Urbanización Los Árboles, Urbanización Pérez Rosado, Urbanización Sun Flowers Valley, and Urbanización Valle Arena.

== Gallery ==
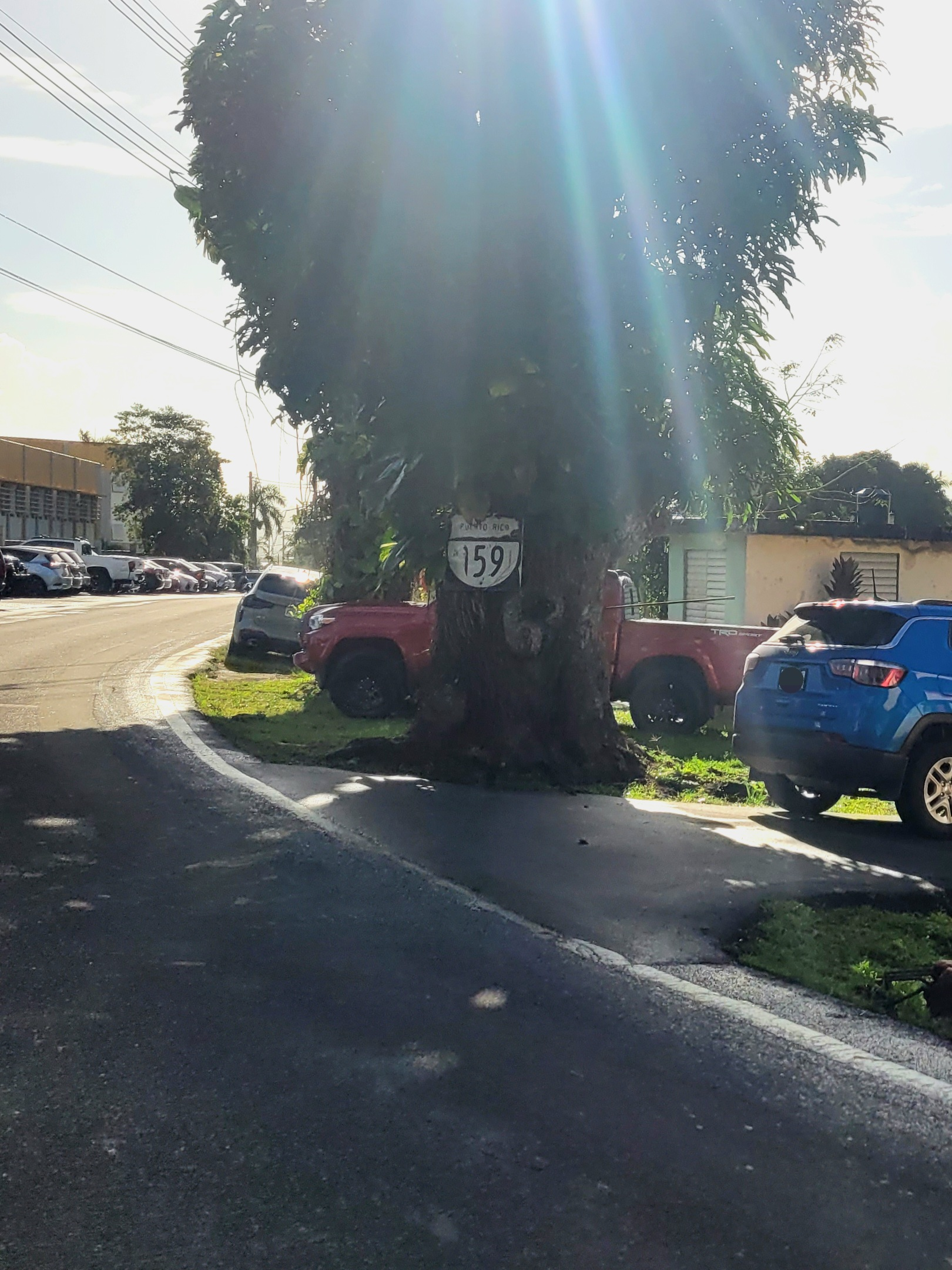
Puerto Rico Highway 159 in Quebrada Arenas

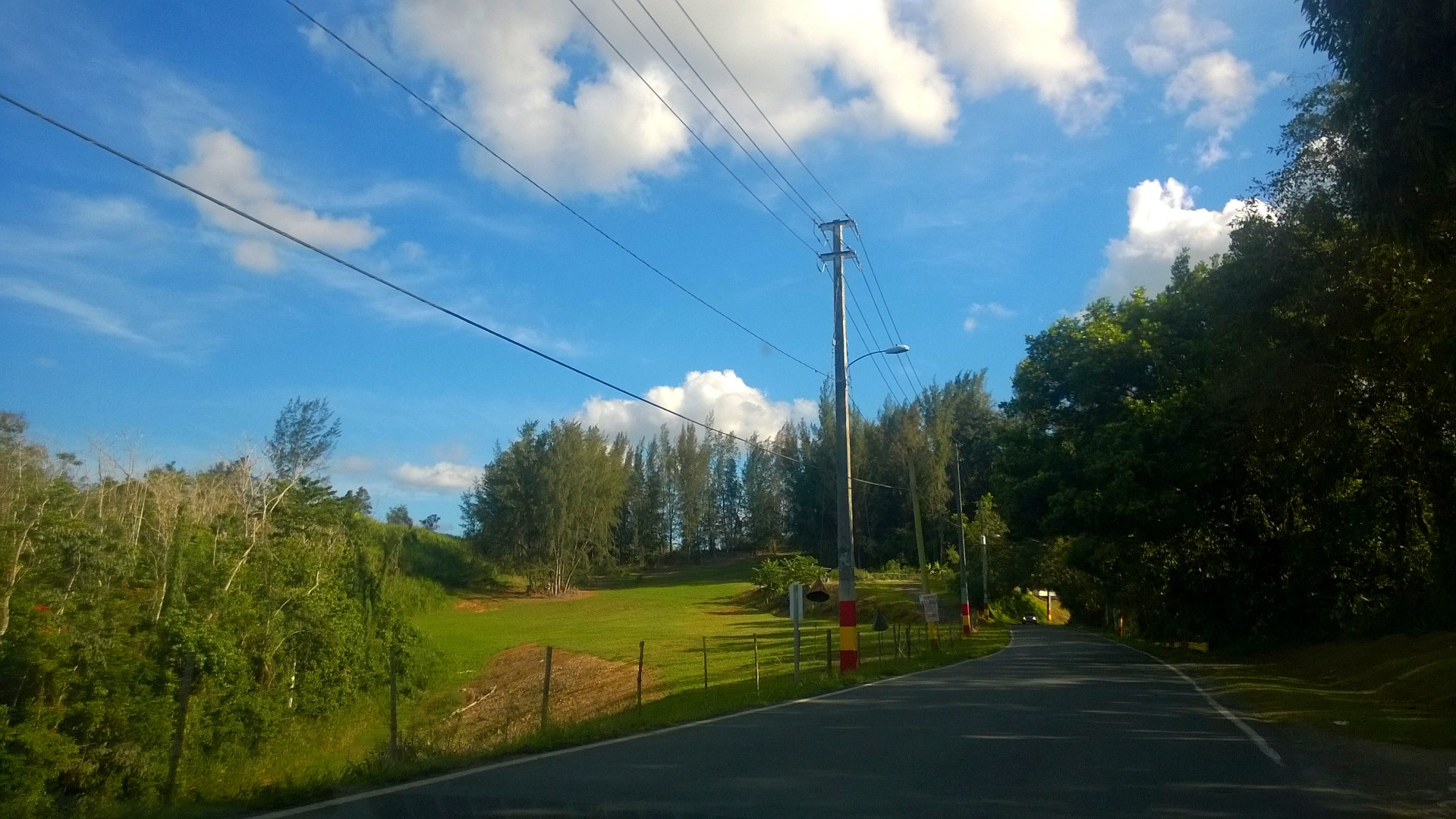
Puerto Rico Highway 806 between Toa Alta and Corozal

== See also ==
- List of communities in Puerto Rico
- List of barrios and sectors of Toa Alta, Puerto Rico
