= Toa Alta, Puerto Rico =

Town and municipality in Puerto Rico

Toa Alta Municipio Autónomo de Toa Alta
- Town and Municipality
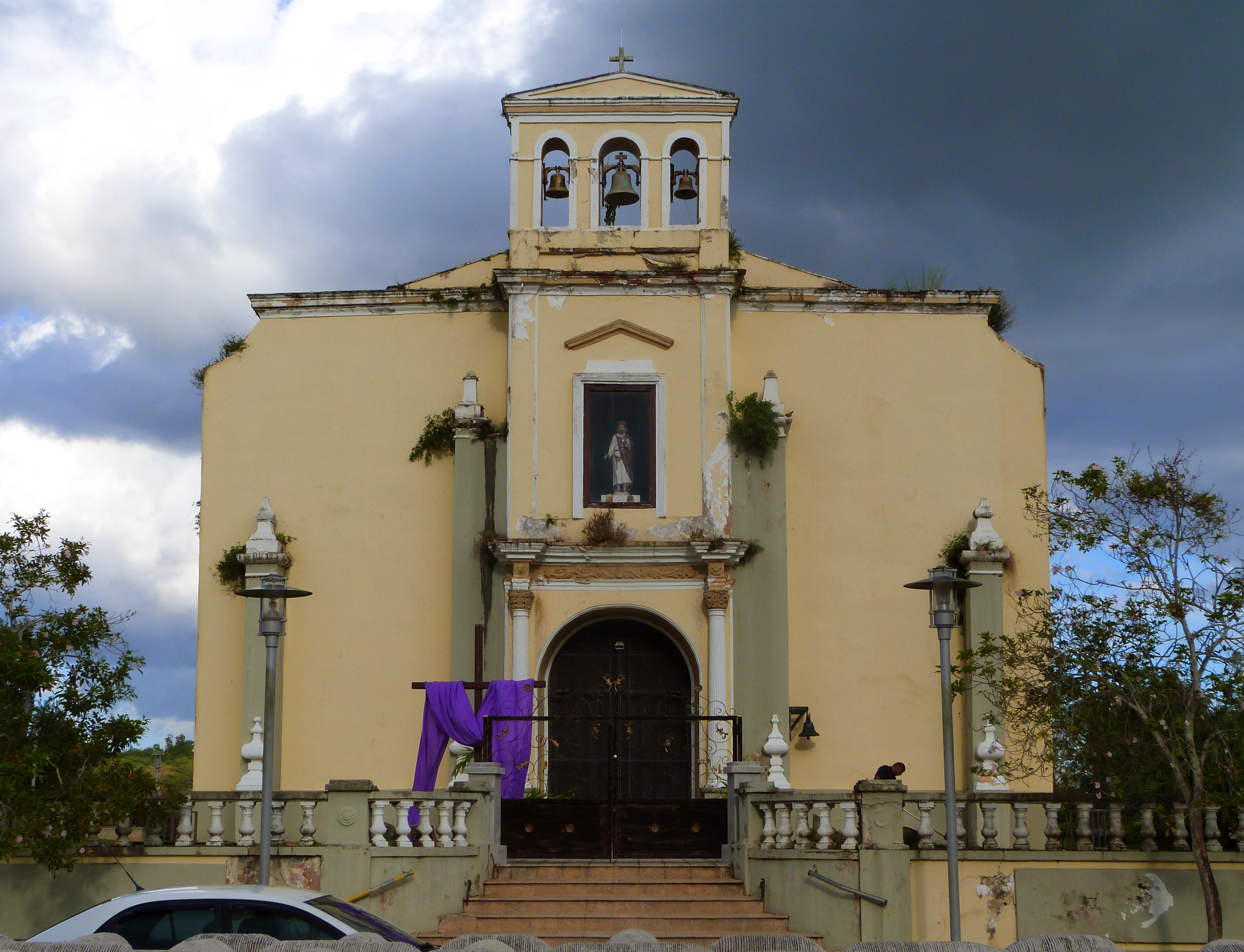
- Church of Nuestra Señora de la Concepción y San Fernando of Toa Alta

- Flag Coat of arms
- Nicknames: La Ciudad del Toa, Cuna de Poetas, Ciudad del Josco
- Anthem: "Cuna de historia y de grandes poetas"
- Map of Puerto Rico highlighting Toa Alta Municipality
- Coordinates: 18°23′18″N 66°14′54″W
- Sovereign state: United States
- Commonwealth: Puerto Rico
- Settled: 1751
- Founded: January 12, 1796
- Barrios: 9 barrios: Contorno; Galateo; Mucarabones; Ortíz; Piñas; Quebrada Arenas; Quebrada Cruz; Río Lajas; Toa Alta barrio-pueblo

Government
  - Mayor: Clemente "Chito" Agosto (PPD)
  - Senatorial dist.: 2 - Bayamón
  - Representative dist.: 11

Area
  - Total: 27.44 sq mi (71.08 km^{2})
  - Land: 27.37 sq mi (70.88 km^{2})
  - Water: 0.077 sq mi (0.20 km^{2})
- Elevation: 236 ft (72 m)

Population (2020)
  - Total: 66,852
  - Estimate (2025): 65,754 ▼
  - Rank: 11th in Puerto Rico
  - Density: 2,443/sq mi (943.2/km^{2})
- Demonym: Toalteños
- Time zone: UTC−4 (AST)
- ZIP Codes: 00953, 00954
- Area code: 787/939

Toa Alta (Spanish pronunciation: [ˈtoa ˈalta]) is a town and municipality of Puerto Rico located in the northern coast of the island, north of Naranjito; south of Dorado and Toa Baja; east of Vega Alta and Corozal; and west of Bayamón. Toa Alta is spread over eight barrios and Toa Alta Pueblo (the downtown area and the administrative center of the city). It is part of the San Juan-Caguas-Guaynabo metropolitan statistical area. There are nine barrios in Toa Alta and altogether in 2020 had a population of 66,852. Río de la Plata, is a large river that runs through Toa Alta. Toa Alta celebrates its patron saint festival in May.

== History ==
Toa Alta is located west of the capital city of San Juan and was founded in 1751, making it one of the oldest towns on the main island of Puerto Rico. The construction of the San Fernando Rey Church in the main town square began in 1752. It is popularly said that the name Toa Alta comes from the Taíno word for mother or fertility, Thoa. Most likely the word toa comes from the Taino word for valley or mountain; the region is also known as Valle del Toa (Toa Valley).

Over the years, agriculture became an important economic force in the area. At the peak of the agricultural economy, the town was also known as the "Granja de los Reyes Católicos" (the Farm of the Catholic Monarchs). The town is also called Ciudad del Josco. The town is commonly known by its nickname La Cuna de los Poetas, or "Cradle of Poets", due to the numerous Spanish-language poets born there, such as Abelardo Díaz Alfaro and the musician Tomás "Masso" Rivera.

Hurricane Maria on September 20, 2017 triggered numerous landslides in Toa Alta. Many homes and roads in Toa Alta were destroyed by the hurricane.

=== Flood control project ===
In mid 2018, the United States Army Corps of Engineers announced it would be undertaking a major flood control project of a river that often causes flooding in Toa Alta, Río de la Plata.

== Geography ==
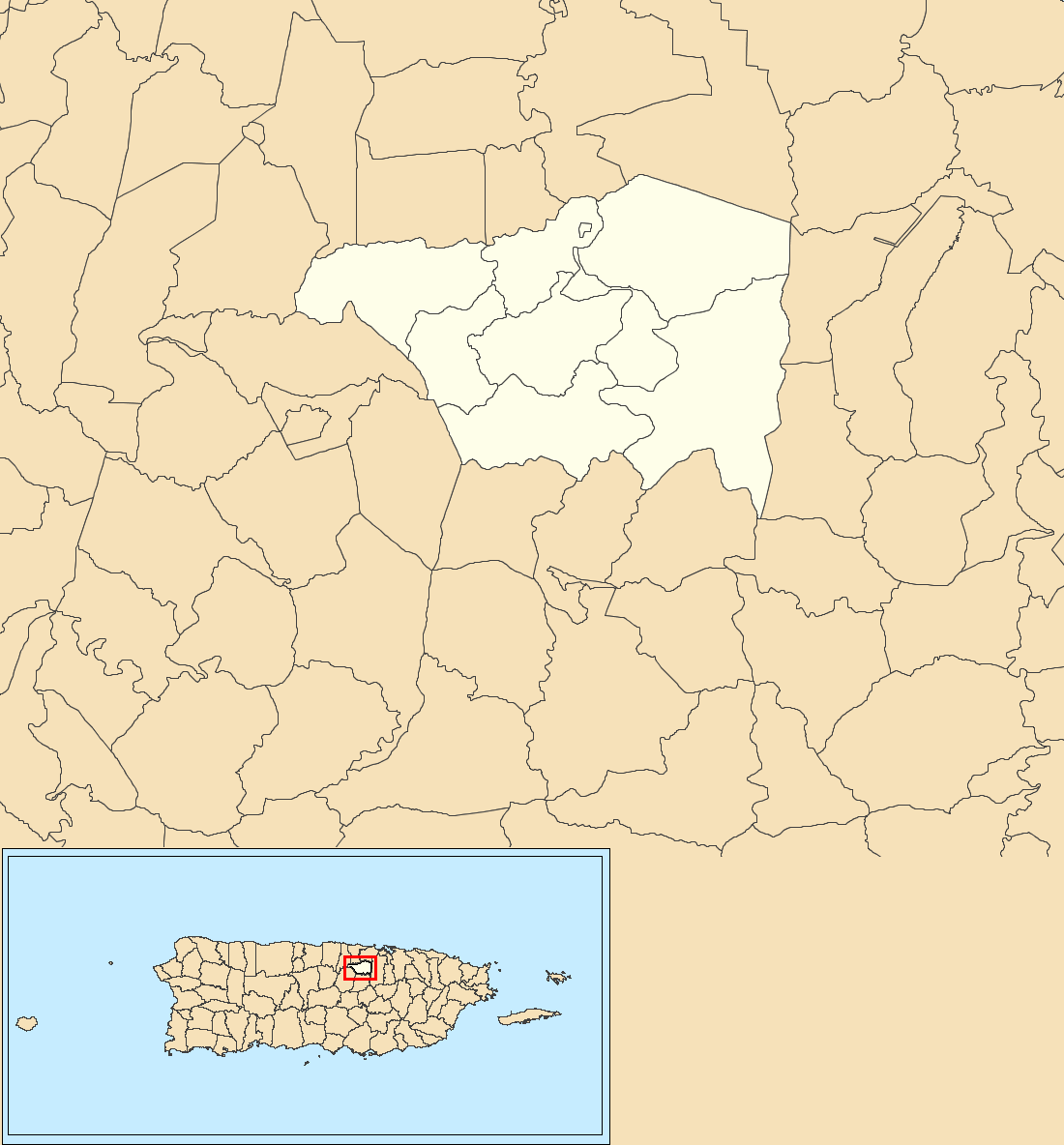
Subdivisions of Toa Alta

Toa Alta is located on the Northern Coastal Plain in the Northern Karst zone.

=== Barrios ===
Like all municipalities of Puerto Rico, Toa Alta is subdivided into barrios. The municipal buildings, central square and large Catholic church are located in a barrio referred to as "el pueblo".

1. Contorno
2. Galateo
3. Mucarabones
4. Ortíz
5. Piñas
6. Quebrada Arenas
7. Quebrada Cruz
8. Río Lajas
9. Toa Alta barrio-pueblo

=== Sectors ===
Barrios (which are, in contemporary times, roughly comparable to minor civil divisions) are further subdivided into smaller areas called sectores (sectors in English). The types of sectores may vary, from normally sector to urbanización to reparto to barriada to residencial, among others.

=== Special Communities ===
Comunidades Especiales de Puerto Rico (Special Communities of Puerto Rico) are marginalized communities whose citizens are experiencing a certain amount of social exclusion. A map shows these communities occur in nearly every municipality of the commonwealth. Of the 742 places that were on the list in 2014, the following barrios, communities, sectors, or neighborhoods were in Toa Alta: Comunidad Acerolas, Sector Cuba Libre, Sector La Prá, Villa del Río, Villa Josco, and Villa Juventud.

== Demographics ==
Historical population
Census	Pop.	Note	%±
1900	7,908		—
1910	9,127		15.4%
1920	10,505		15.1%
1930	11,696		11.3%
1940	13,371		14.3%
1950	14,155		5.9%
1960	15,711		11.0%
1970	18,964		20.7%
1980	31,910		68.3%
1990	44,101		38.2%
2000	63,929		45.0%
2010	74,066		15.9%
2020	66,852		−9.7%
2025 (est.)	65,754	▼	−1.6%
U.S. Decennial Census; 1899 (shown as 1900) 1910-1930; 1930-1950 1960-2000 2010 2020

== Tourism ==
=== Landmarks and places of interest ===
- Legendary tree Bala de Cañón
- Tomás "Maso" Rivera Municipal Theatre
- Tomás "Maso" Rivera Statue
- Egozcué Square public plaza
- San Fernando Rey Parish Church
- Villa Tropical Recreation Center
- Plaza Aquarium Mall
- Valle El Toa

== Culture ==
=== Festivals and events ===
Toa Alta celebrates its patron saint festival in May. The Fiestas Patronales de San Fernando is a religious and cultural celebration that generally features parades, games, artisans, amusement rides, regional food, and live entertainment.

Festival El Josco or the Festival of the Mechanical Bull is held in October.

Other festivals and events celebrated in Toa Alta include La Chopa Marathon, held in March, and Folk Music Festival, held in November.

== Government ==
All municipalities in Puerto Rico are administered by a mayor, elected every four years. The current mayor of Toa Alta is Clemente Agosto, of the Popular Democratic Party (PPD). He was first elected at the 2012 general elections.

The city belongs to the Puerto Rico Senatorial district II, which is represented by two senators. Migdalia Padilla and Carmelo Ríos Santiago have served as District Senators since 2005.

== Transportation ==
There are 16 bridges in Toa Alta. In January, 2019 the mayor of Toa Alta fought for the reopening of highway #861, which, he stated, was closed without warning by Puerto Rico Public Works.

== Symbols ==
The municipio has an official flag and coat of arms.

=== Flag ===
Horizontally divided in three, the bottom and top red stripes are double the size of the center yellow stripe. In the upper left corner is a yellow, eight-point star. The original design was elaborated by professor Herman E. Perez and adopted by the City Council in 1983.

=== Coat of arms ===
The shield in gold, a red board with a silver sword topped with a gold crown of the same metal, to each side two small shields in red, the right-hand one with a tower in gold with a crescent moon on the top and the left-hand one with a gold eight point star, a five tower crown lined in black with red openings. The motto is Non Deserit Alta and Professor Herman E. Pérez included it in the coat of arms so that present and future generations will remember to “not abandon higher principles and values”.

== Education ==
There are several public and private schools in Toa Alta and public education is handled by the Puerto Rico Department of Education.

=== Elementary schools ===
- Alejandro Junior Cruz
- Heraclio Rivera Colón
- José de Diego
- José María del Valle
- Luis Muñoz Rivera
- Manuel Velilla
- María C. Osorio
- Merced Marcano
- Secundino Díaz
- Violanta Jiménez
- Virgilio Morales

=== Middle and junior high schools ===
- José Pablo Morales
- Abelardo Díaz Alfaro
- Felipe Díaz González

=== High schools ===
- Adela Rolón Fuentes
- Nicolás Sevilla
- Tomás "Maso" Rivera Morales

=== Private schools ===
- Academia Cristiana Yarah
- Colegio Doriber

== Notable natives and residents ==
- Sergeants José Díaz and Francisco Díaz – defended Puerto Rico from a British invasion in 1797
- Dayanara Torres – Miss Universe 1993
- Eddie Santiago - Platinum selling Salsa and Merengue recording artist

== See also ==
- List of Puerto Ricans
- History of Puerto Rico
- Did you know-Puerto Rico?
