= Puerto Rico Highway 888 =

Highway in Puerto Rico

Highway 888
- Ruta 888
- Avenida Las Nereidas

Route information
- Maintained by Puerto Rico DTPW
- Length: 3.5 km (2.2 mi)

Major junctions
- West end: PR-165 in Palmas
- PR-24 in Cataño barrio-pueblo
- East end: PR-5 in Cataño barrio-pueblo

Location
- Country: United States
- Territory: Puerto Rico
- Municipalities: Cataño

Highway system
- Roads in Puerto Rico; List
| ← PR-873 | → PR-891 |

Puerto Rico Highway 888 (PR-888) is a road located in Cataño, Puerto Rico. It goes from PR-165 in Palmas barrio to downtown Cataño, bordering San Juan Bay until its end at PR-5 in La Puntilla sector. The entire route is known as Avenida Las Nereidas.

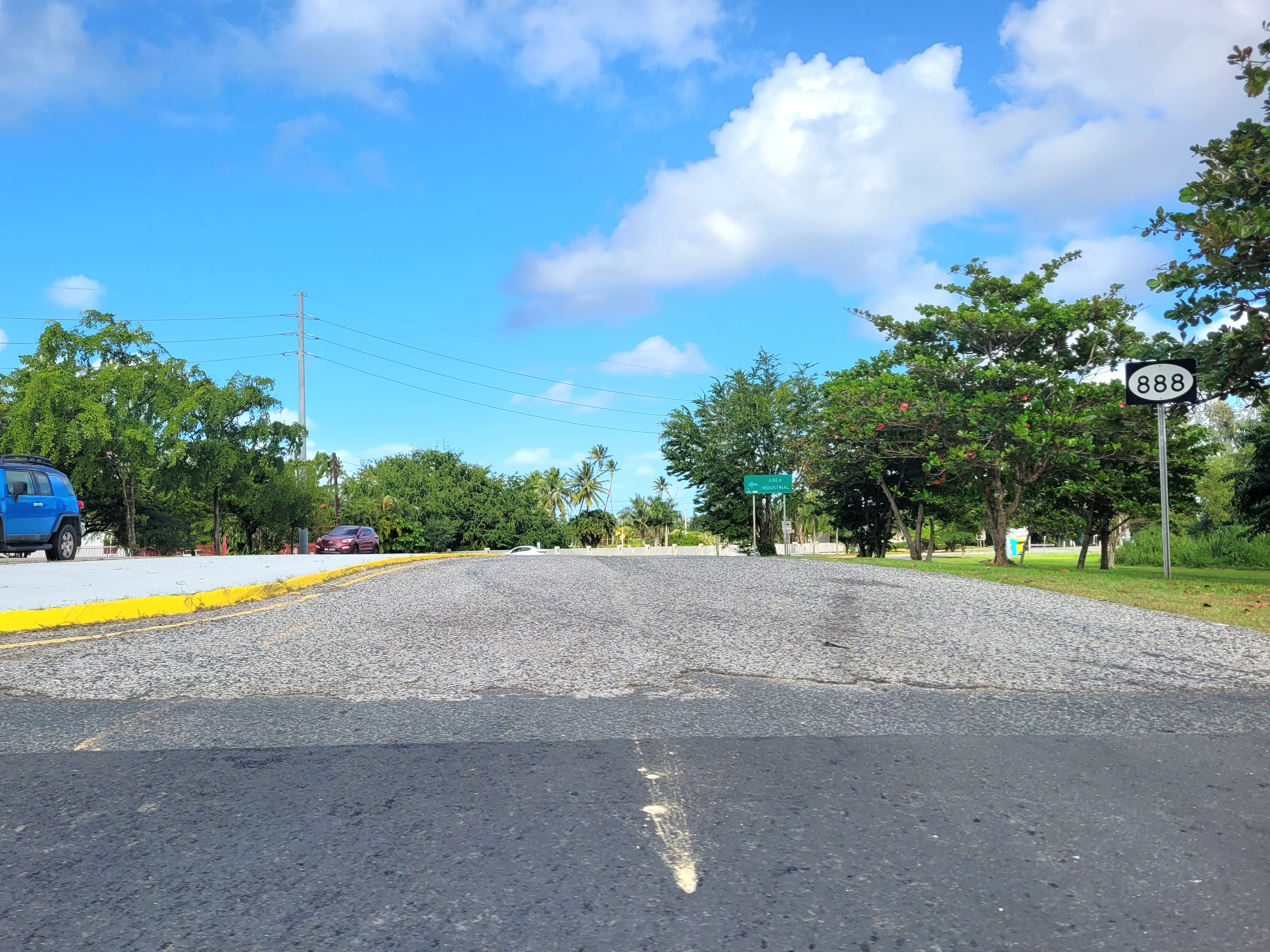
Puerto Rico Highway 888 east in Palmas

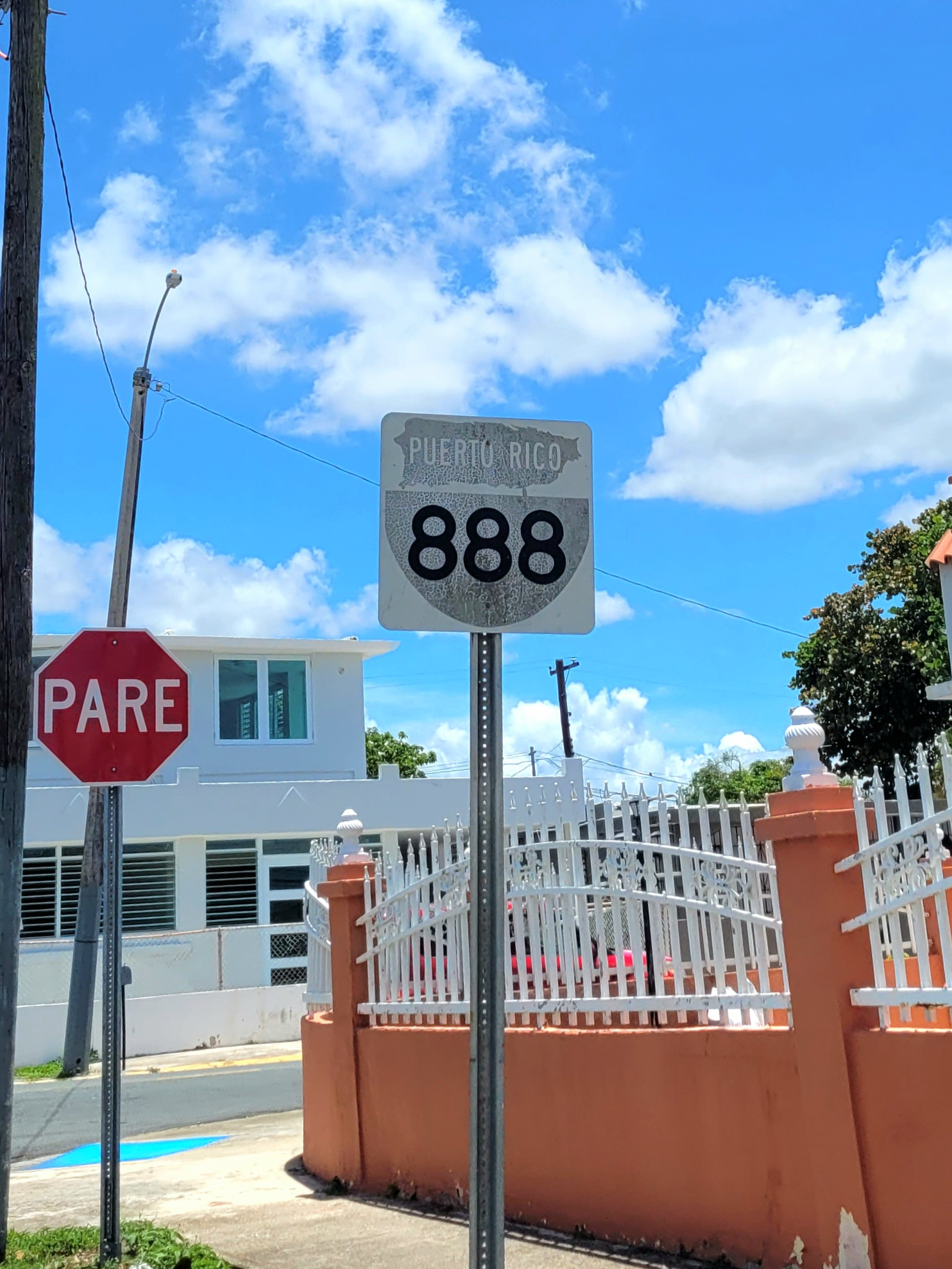
Approaching Puerto Rico Highway 888 near downtown Cataño

== Major intersections ==
The entire route is located in Cataño.

| Location | km | mi | Destinations | Notes |
|---|---|---|---|---|
| Palmas | 0.0 | 0.0 | PR-165 | Western terminus of PR-888; access to San Juan and Dorado |
| Cataño barrio-pueblo | 3.1 | 1.9 | PR-24 | Northern terminus of PR-24; access to Guaynabo |
| Cataño barrio-pueblo | 3.5 | 2.2 | PR-5 | One-way street; eastern terminus of PR-888; no access to southbound; unsigned |
1.000 mi = 1.609 km; 1.000 km = 0.621 mi: Incomplete access
