= PR-24 =

PR-24 and PR24 may refer to:

- Side-handle baton, a baton with a short side handle at a right angle to the shaft, about six inches from one end
- Puerto Rico Highway 24, a road connecting the city of Cataño to Guaynabo
