= Puerto Rico Highway 24 =

Highway in Puerto Rico

Highway 24
- Ruta 24

Route information
- Maintained by Puerto Rico DTPW
- Length: 1.7 km (1.1 mi)

Major junctions
- South end: PR-165 in Pueblo Viejo
- PR-5 in Cataño barrio-pueblo
- North end: PR-888 in Cataño barrio-pueblo

Location
- Country: United States
- Territory: Puerto Rico
- Municipalities: Guaynabo, Cataño

Highway system
- Roads in Puerto Rico; List
← PR-23	→ PR-25

Puerto Rico Highway 24 (PR-24) is a north–south road located between the municipalities of Cataño and Guaynabo, Puerto Rico. This highway extends from Avenida Las Nereidas (PR-888) in downtown Cataño to Avenida El Caño (PR-165) near the Metropolitan Detention Center, Guaynabo. In Cataño, it is known as Calle Wilson, and in Guaynabo, as Avenida Juan Ponce de León.

Puerto Rico Highway 24

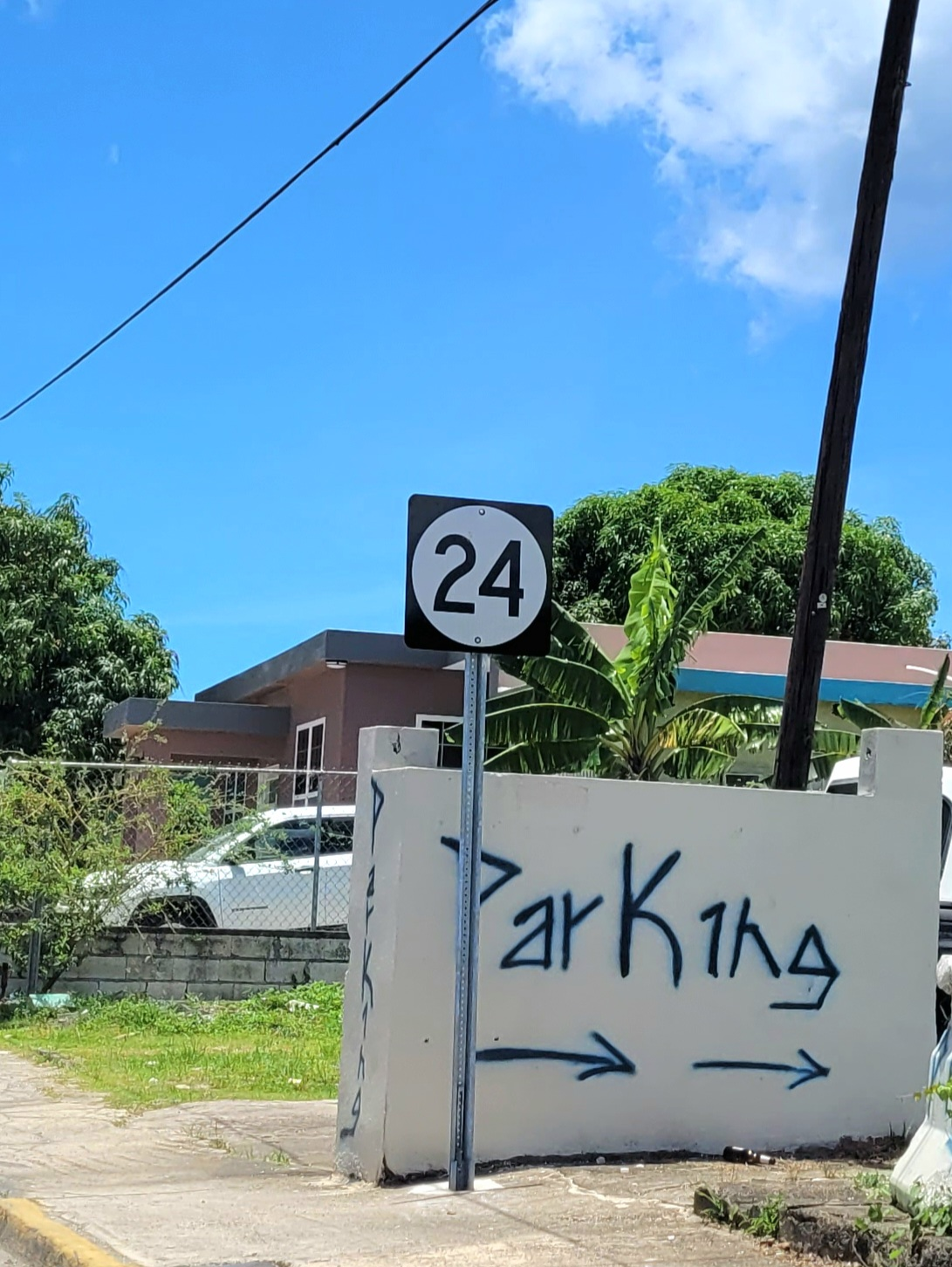
Heading north in Amelia, Guaynabo

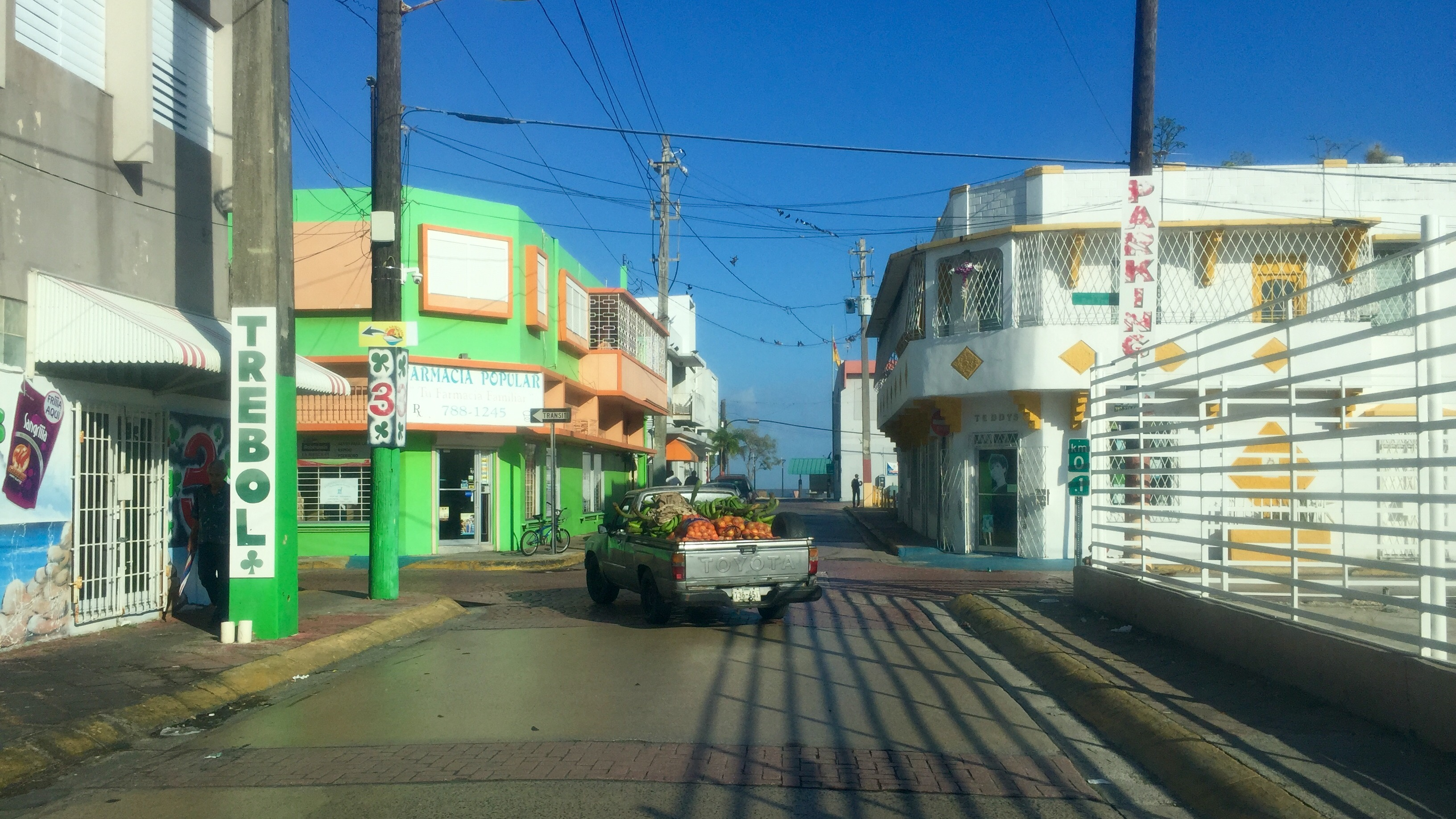
Heading north in downtown Cataño

== Major intersections ==
Municipality	Location	km	mi	Destinations	Notes
Guaynabo	Pueblo Viejo	1.7	1.1	PR-165 – San Juan, Toa Baja	Diamond interchange; southern terminus of PR-24
Guaynabo–Cataño municipal line	Pueblo Viejo–Cataño barrio-pueblo line	0.4	0.25	Northern terminus of Avenida Juan Ponce de León and southern terminus of Calle Wilson	
Cataño	Cataño barrio-pueblo	0.1– 0.0	0.062– 0.0	PR-5	One-way street; southbound access (to Bayamón) is via Calle Tren; unsigned
Cataño	Cataño barrio-pueblo	0.0	0.0	PR-888	Northern terminus of PR-24; unsigned
1.000 mi = 1.609 km; 1.000 km = 0.621 mi: Incomplete access; Route transition
