= Sanctuary of Blessed Martín de Porres =

- U.S. National Register of Historic Places
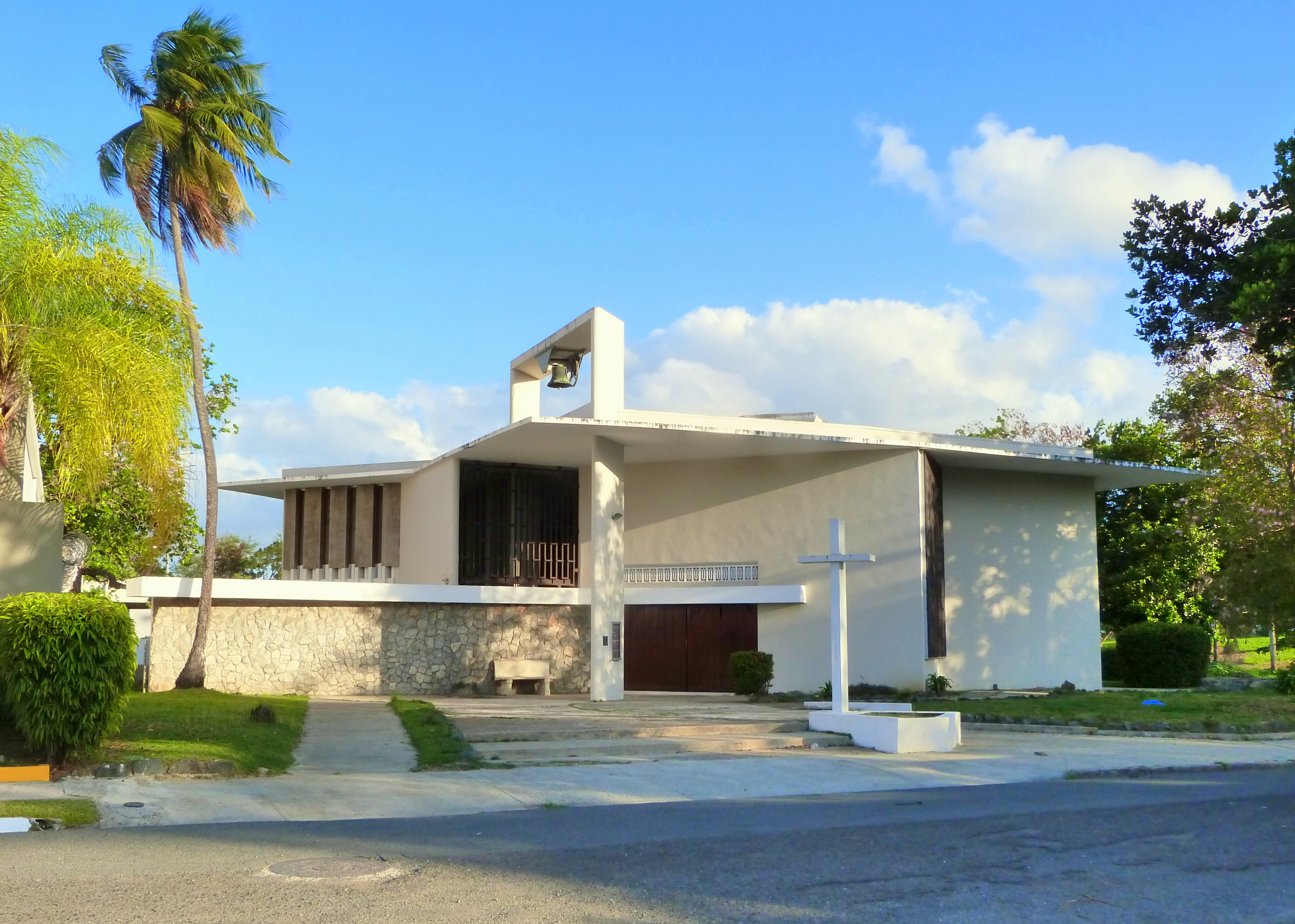
- 2017

- Location within Puerto Rico
- Location: Comercio and Oeste Cementerio Streets in Palmas, Cataño, Puerto Rico
- Coordinates: 18°26′37″N 66°7′59″W
- Built: 1950
- Architect: Henry Klumb
- Architectural style: Modernist
- NRHP reference No.: 100000503
- Added to NRHP: January 11, 2017

The National Sanctuary of Blessed Martín de Porres (Spanish: Santuario Nacional San Martín de Porres) is a Catholic church and sanctuary dedicated to Martin de Porres located in Cataño, Puerto Rico. It was built in 1951 for the Dominican Priests as a pilgrimage church and as part of the community services for the Bay View and Bahía residential developments of suburban San Juan. German born Henry Klumb, designed the building in a Modernist style with a regional approach linked to the organic architecture described by Frank Lloyd Wright. The architect also followed liturgical and sacramental functions as dictated by doctrinal documents of the Catholic Church. The building was added to the United States National Register of Historic Places in 2017.

== Gallery ==
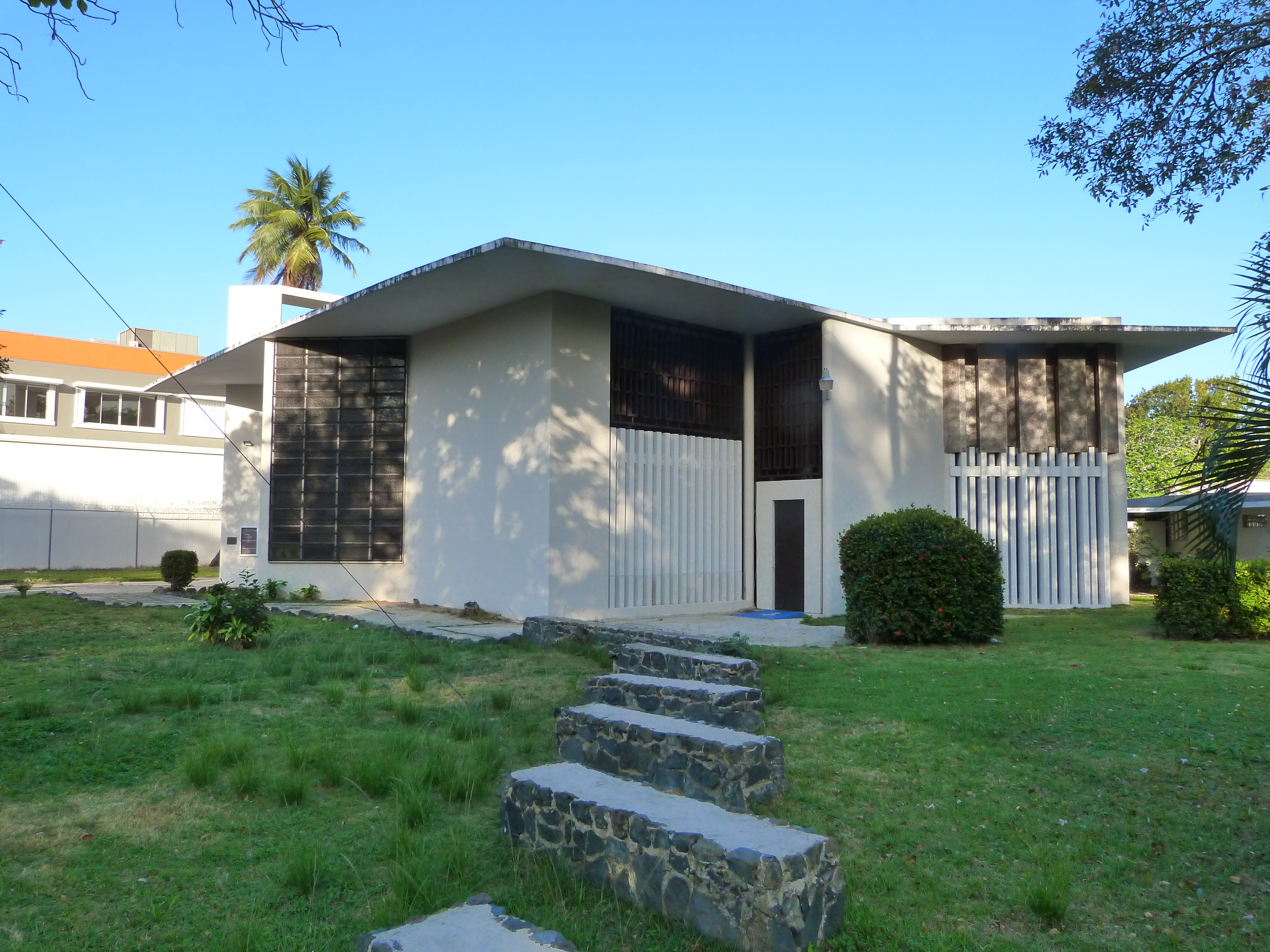
2017
