= List of barrios and sectors of Cataño, Puerto Rico =

Like all municipalities of Puerto Rico, Cataño is subdivided into administrative units called barrios, which are, in contemporary times, roughly comparable to minor civil divisions. The barrios and subbarrios, in turn, are further subdivided into smaller local populated place areas/units called sectores (sectors in English). The types of sectores may vary, from normally sector to urbanización to reparto to barriada to residencial, among others. Some sectors appear in two barrios.

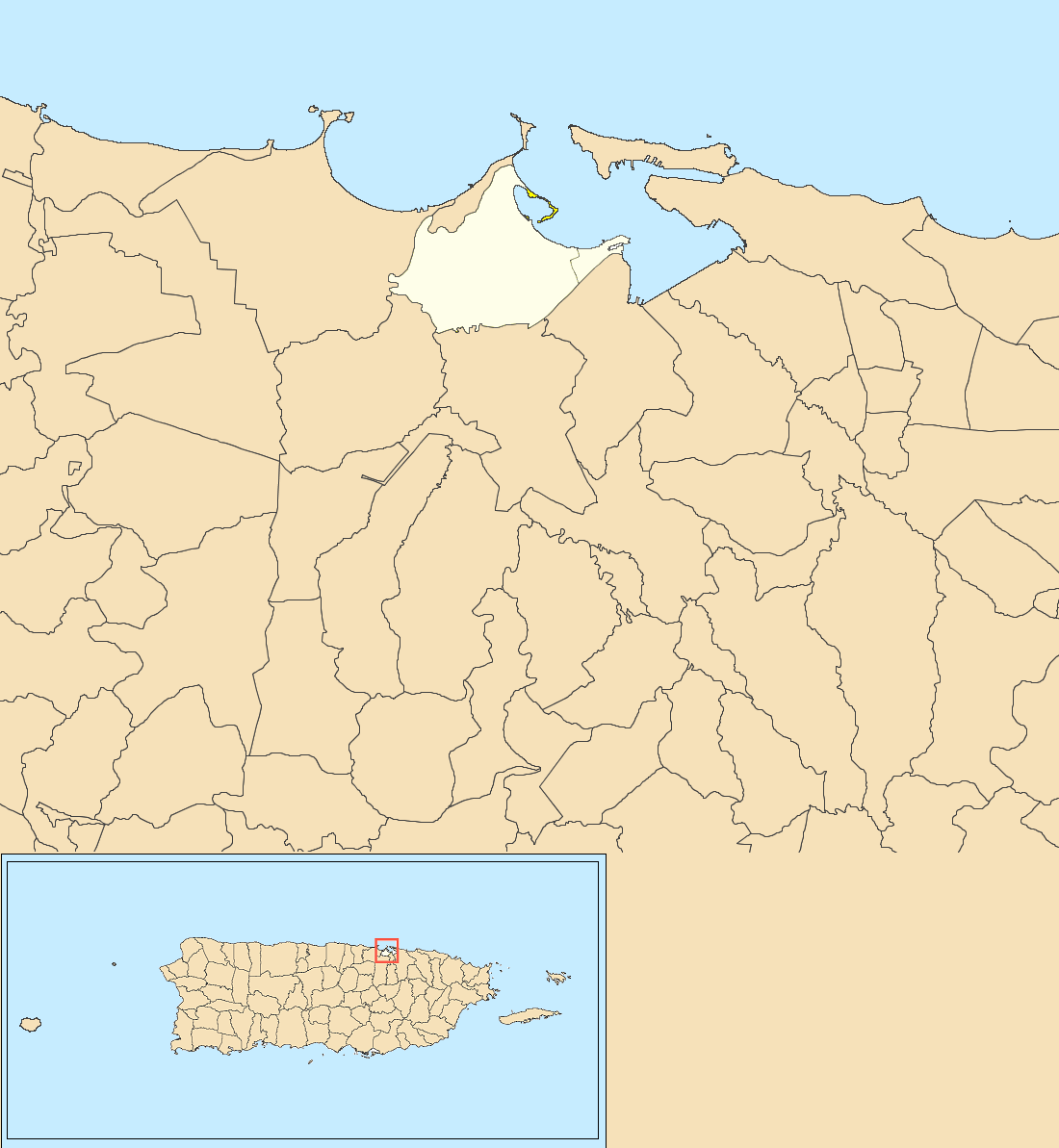
Cataño map

== List of sectors by barrio ==
=== Cataño barrio-pueblo ===
- Avenida Barbosa
- Avenida Las Nereidas
- Barriada Vietnam
- Streets: Canals, Charca, Pasaje Puntillas, Prolongación, Calle Tren, Recreo, San Antonio, San Fernando, Santa Rosa
- Comunidad Amelia
- Condominio Ciudad Feliz
- Puerto Bello Apartmentos 105
- Residencial Mantienzo Cintrón
- Sector Puntilla

=== Palmas ===
- Barriada Juana Matos
- Barriada Puente Blanco
- Carretera 165
- Condominio Angelí 2000
- Condominio Angelí 2100
- Condominio Bahía Court
- Parcelas William Fuertes
- Reparto Paraíso
- Residencial El Coquí
- Residencial Jardines de Cataño
- Residencial Juana Matos
- Residencial Público Las Palmas
- Sector Cucharilla
- Urbanización Almira
- Urbanización Bahía
- Urbanización Bajo Costo
- Urbanización Bay View
- Urbanización Coquí II
- Urbanización Dos Ríos
- Urbanización Enramada
- Urbanización Jardines de Cataño
- Urbanización Jardines de Cataño II
- Urbanización Las Vegas
- Urbanización Mansión del Norte
- Urbanización Mansión del Río
- Urbanización Mansión del Sur
- Urbanización Mansiones del Parque
- Urbanización Marina Bahía
- Urbanización Palm Court
- Urbanización Pradera
- Urbanización Proyecto 141
- Urbanización Valparaíso
- Urbanización Villa Aurora
- Urbanización Vista al Mar
- Urbanización Vistas del Morro

== See also ==
- List of communities in Puerto Rico
