= José Rosario =

Puerto Rican politician

Mayor of Cataño
- In office January 14, 2009 – January 2017
- Preceded by: Wilson Soto
- Succeeded by: Félix "El Cano" Delgado

Personal details
- Born: November 27, 1967 (age 58) San Juan, Puerto Rico
- Party: Popular Democratic Party (PPD)
- Children: José Alejandro; Juliana Sofía
- Education: Interamerican University of Puerto Rico (BBA)

José A. Rosario Meléndez (born November 27, 1967) is a Puerto Rican politician and the former mayor of Cataño. Rosario is affiliated with the Popular Democratic Party (PPD) and has served as mayor from 2009 until 2017. Has a Bachelor of Business Administration from the Interamerican University of Puerto Rico.
