= Wilson Soto =

Puerto Rican politician

Mayor of Cataño
- In office 2003 – January 1, 2009
- Preceded by: Edwin Rivera Sierra
- Succeeded by: José Rosario

Personal details
- Party: New Progressive Party (PNP)
- Spouse: Elizabeth González
- Occupation: Politician

Wilson Soto Molina is a Puerto Rican politician and former mayor of Cataño.

Soto was sworn in as mayor of Cataño in 2003, after longtime mayor Edwin Rivera Sierra presented his resignation. He was then elected officially at the 2004 general elections. Soto ran for reelection at the 2008 general elections, but lost to the candidate of the Popular Democratic Party, José Rosario.

After that, Soto was indicted on nine charges of bribery and violation of the code of ethics. In 2011, he was found guilty of all the charges and sentenced to four years in prison. Soto still maintains his innocence.
