= Palmas, Cataño, Puerto Rico =

Barrio of Puerto Rico

Palmas
- Barrio
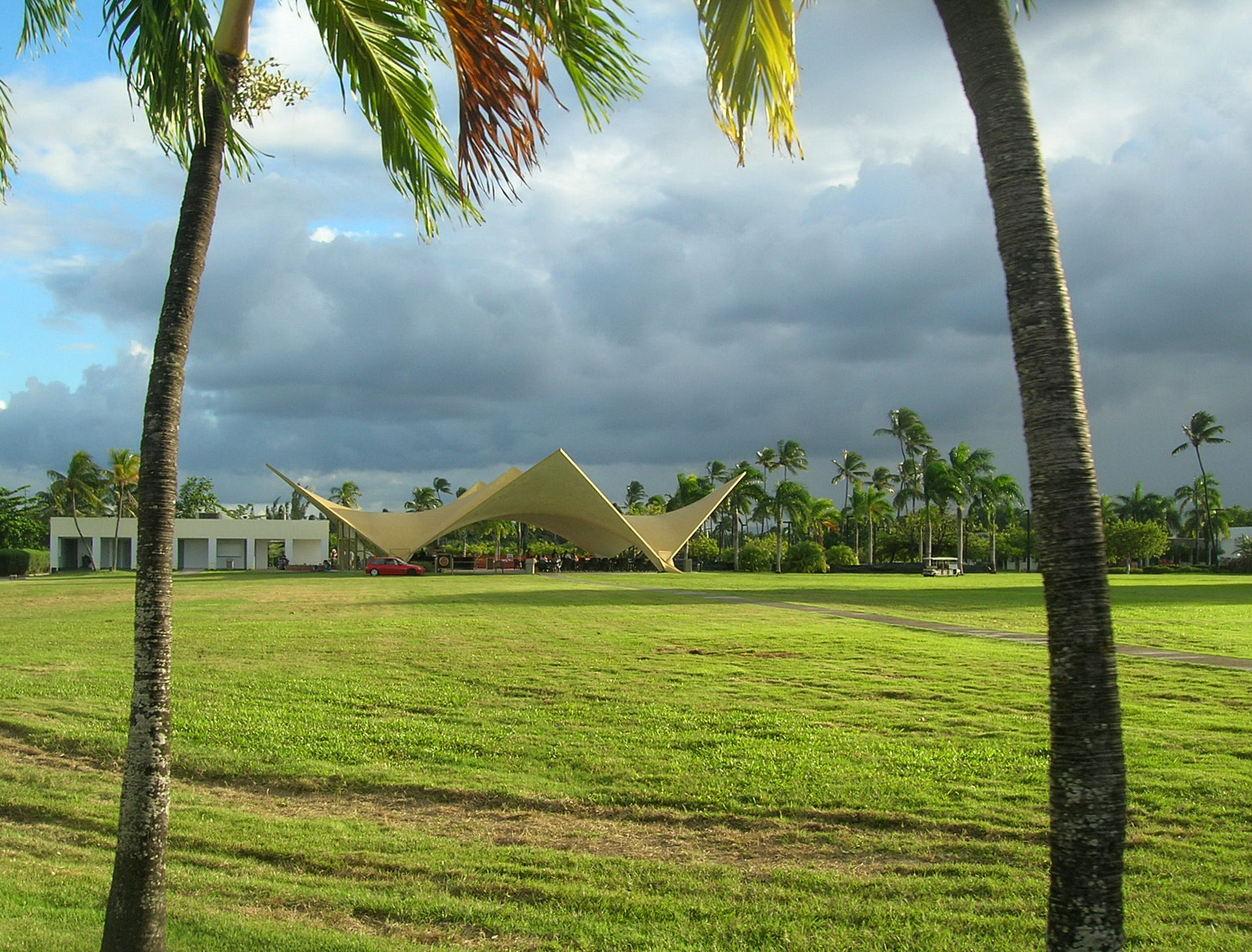
- Bacardi (rum) pavilion in Palmas

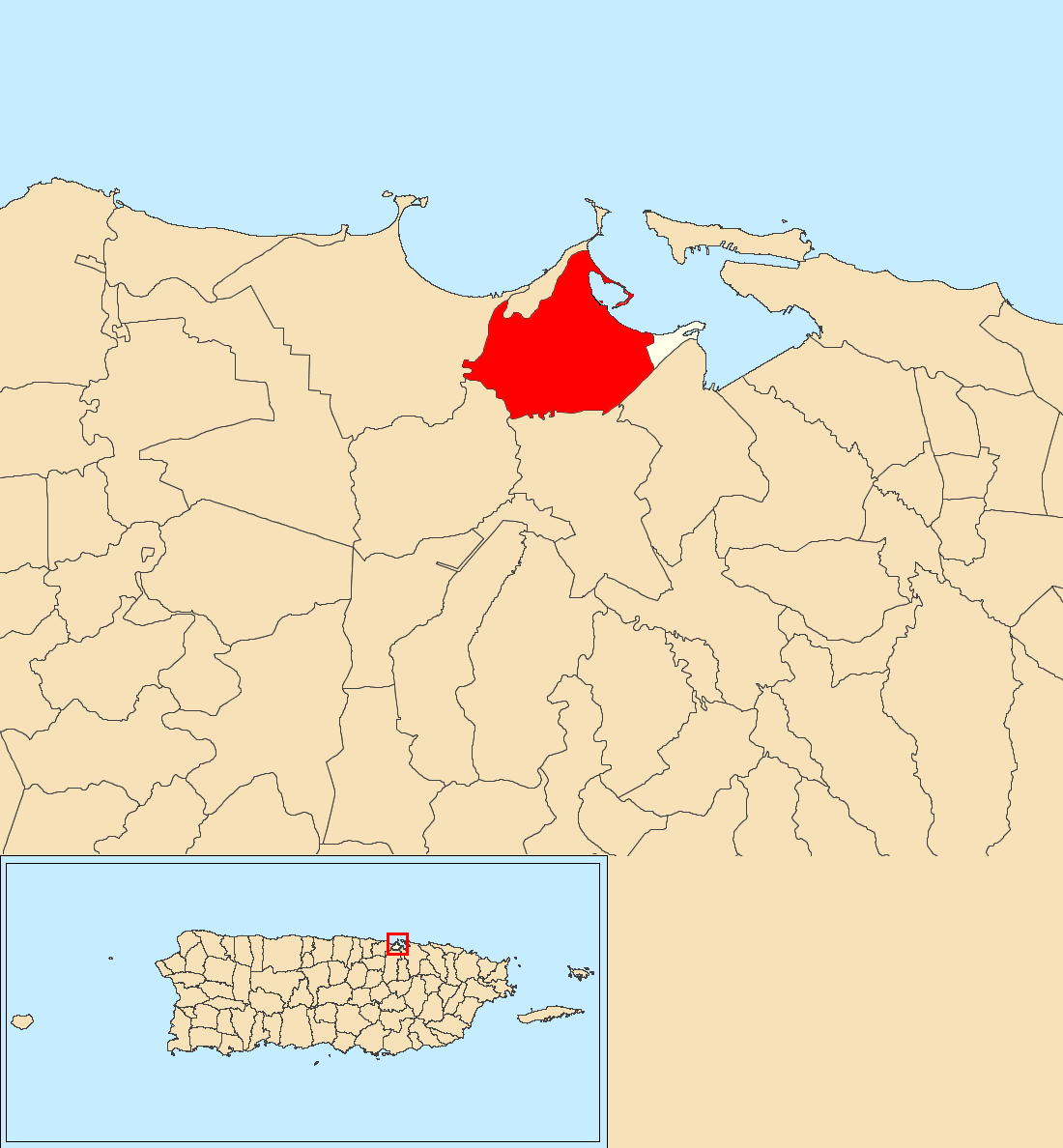
- Location of Palmas within the municipality of Cataño shown in red

- Location of Puerto Rico
- Coordinates: 18°26′41″N 66°08′56″W
- Commonwealth: Puerto Rico
- Municipality: Cataño

Area
  - Total: 6.01 sq mi (15.6 km^{2})
  - Land: 4.59 sq mi (11.9 km^{2})
  - Water: 1.42 sq mi (3.7 km^{2})
- Elevation: 0 ft (0 m)

Population (2010)
  - Total: 23,857
  - Density: 5,209/sq mi (2,011/km^{2})
- Source: 2010 Census
- Time zone: UTC−4 (AST)
- ZIP Codes: 00962, 00963
- Area code: 787/939

Palmas is a barrio in the municipality of Cataño, Puerto Rico. Its population in 2010 was 23,857.

== Features and demographics ==
Palmas has 4.59 square miles (11.9 km^{2}) of land area and 1.42 square miles (3.7 km^{2}) of water area. In 2010, its population was 23,857 with a population density of 5,209 inhabitants per square mile (2,011/km^{2}).

Historical population
Census	Pop.	Note	%±
1900	406		—
1910	400		−1.5%
1920	699		74.8%
1930	1,460		108.9%
1940	1,795		22.9%
1950	10,683		495.2%
1960	16,932		58.5%
1970	0		−100.0%
1980	21,647		—
1990	28,918		33.6%
2000	25,443		−12.0%
2010	23,857		−6.2%
U.S. Decennial Census; 1899 (shown as 1900) 1910-1930; 1930-1950 1980-2000 2010

== Sectors ==
Barrios (which are, in contemporary times, roughly comparable to minor civil divisions) in turn are further subdivided into smaller local populated place areas/units called sectores (sectors in English). The types of sectores may vary, from normally sector to urbanización to reparto to barriada to residencial, among others.

The following sectors are in Palmas barrio:

Barriada Juana Matos, Barriada Puente Blanco, Carretera 165 (until Central Termoeléctrica), Condominio Angelí 2000, Condominio Angelí 2100, Condominio Bahía Court, Parcelas William Fuertes, Reparto Paraíso, Residencial El Coquí, Residencial Jardines de Cataño, Residencial Juana Matos, Residencial Público Las Palmas, Sector Cucharilla, Urbanización Almira, Urbanización Bahía, Urbanización Bajo Costo, Urbanización Bay View, Urbanización Coquí II, Urbanización Dos Ríos, Urbanización Enramada, Urbanización Jardines de Cataño, Urbanización Jardines de Cataño II, Urbanización Las Vegas, Urbanización Mansión del Norte, Urbanización Mansión del Río, Urbanización Mansión del Sur, Urbanización Mansiones del Parque, Urbanización Marina Bahía, Urbanización Palm Court, Urbanización Pradera, Urbanización Proyecto 141, Urbanización Valparaíso, Urbanización Villa Aurora, Urbanización Vista al Mar, and Urbanización Vistas del Morro.

== Notable landmarks ==
Palmas is home to the Bacardi distillery complex.

== Gallery ==
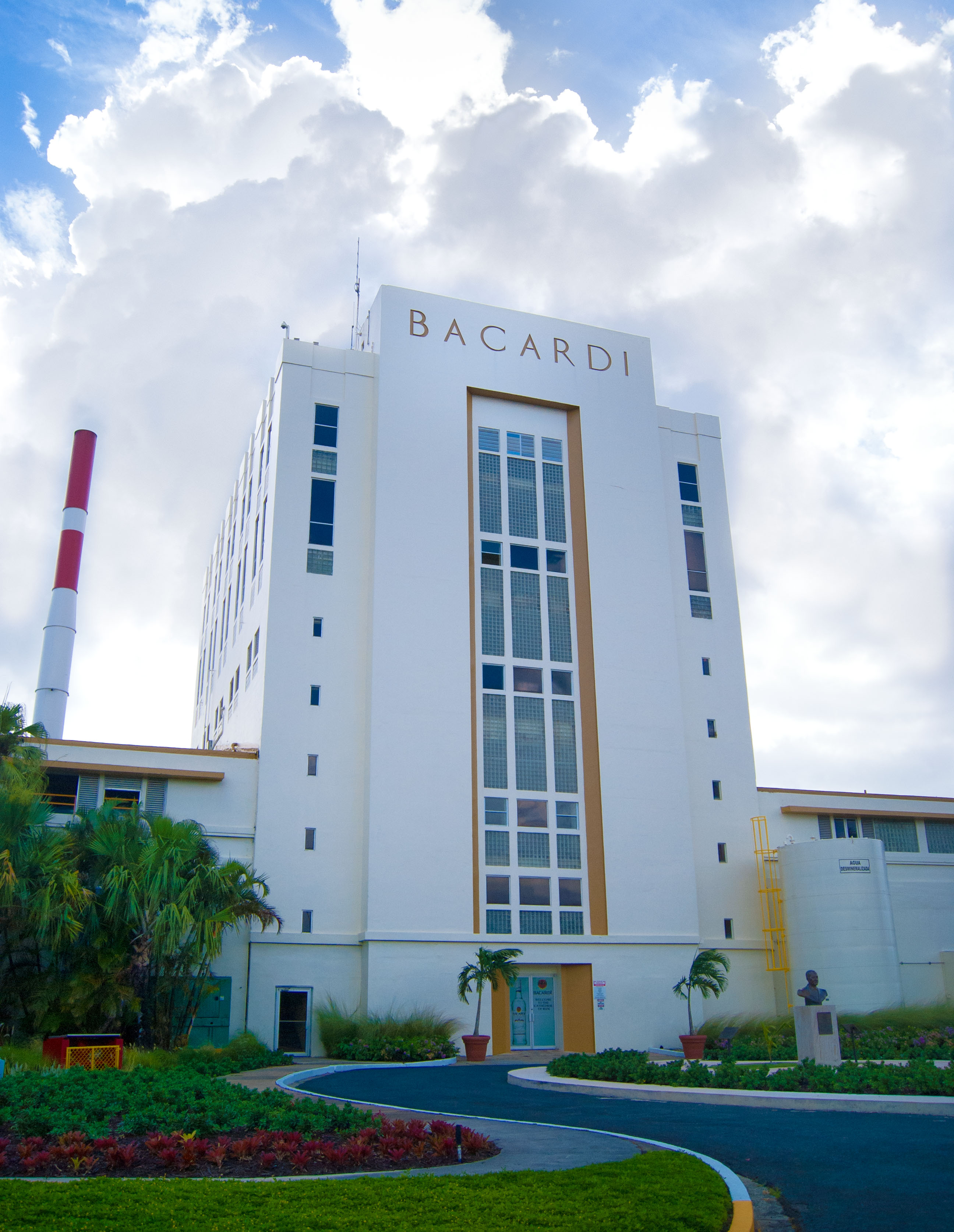
Bacardi building in Palmas

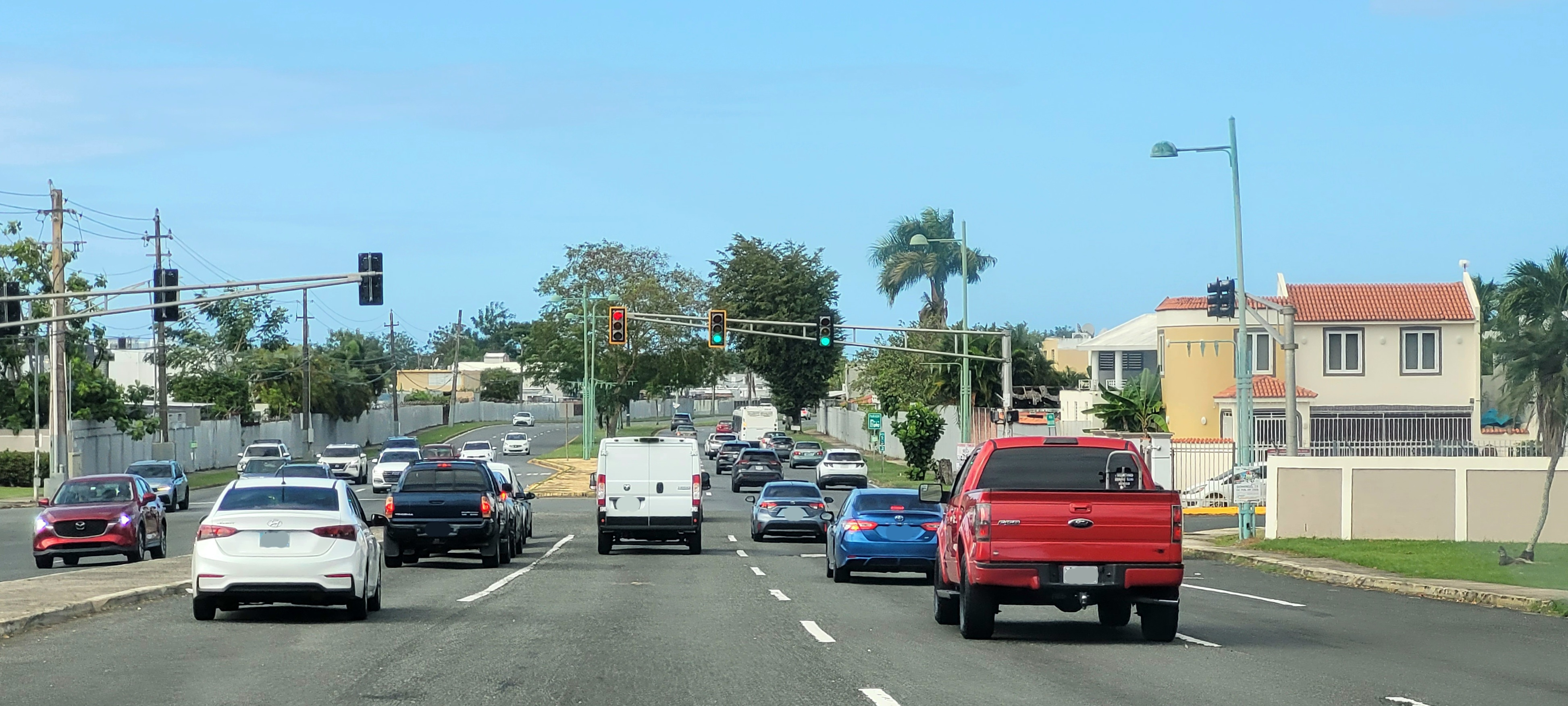
Puerto Rico Highway 167 in Palmas

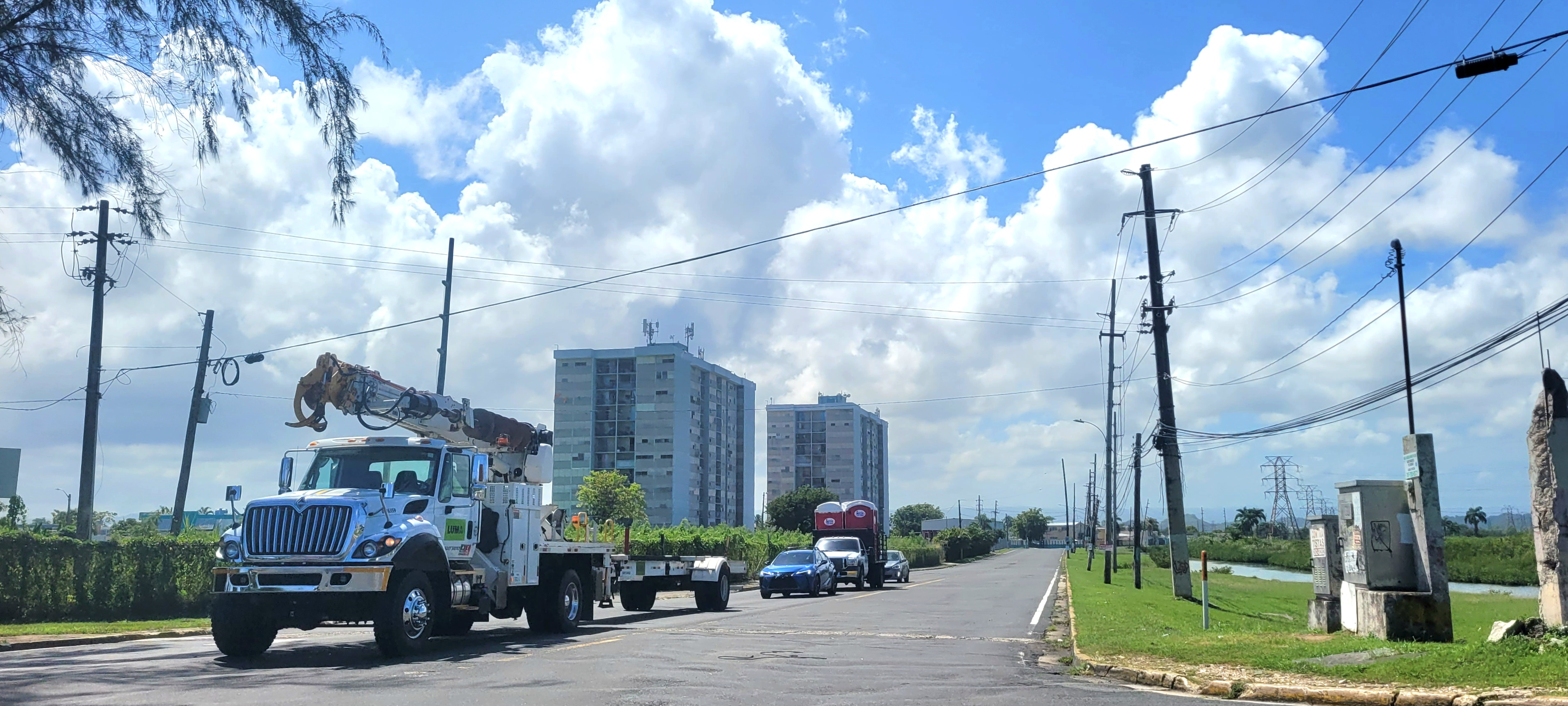
Puerto Rico Highway 869 in Palmas

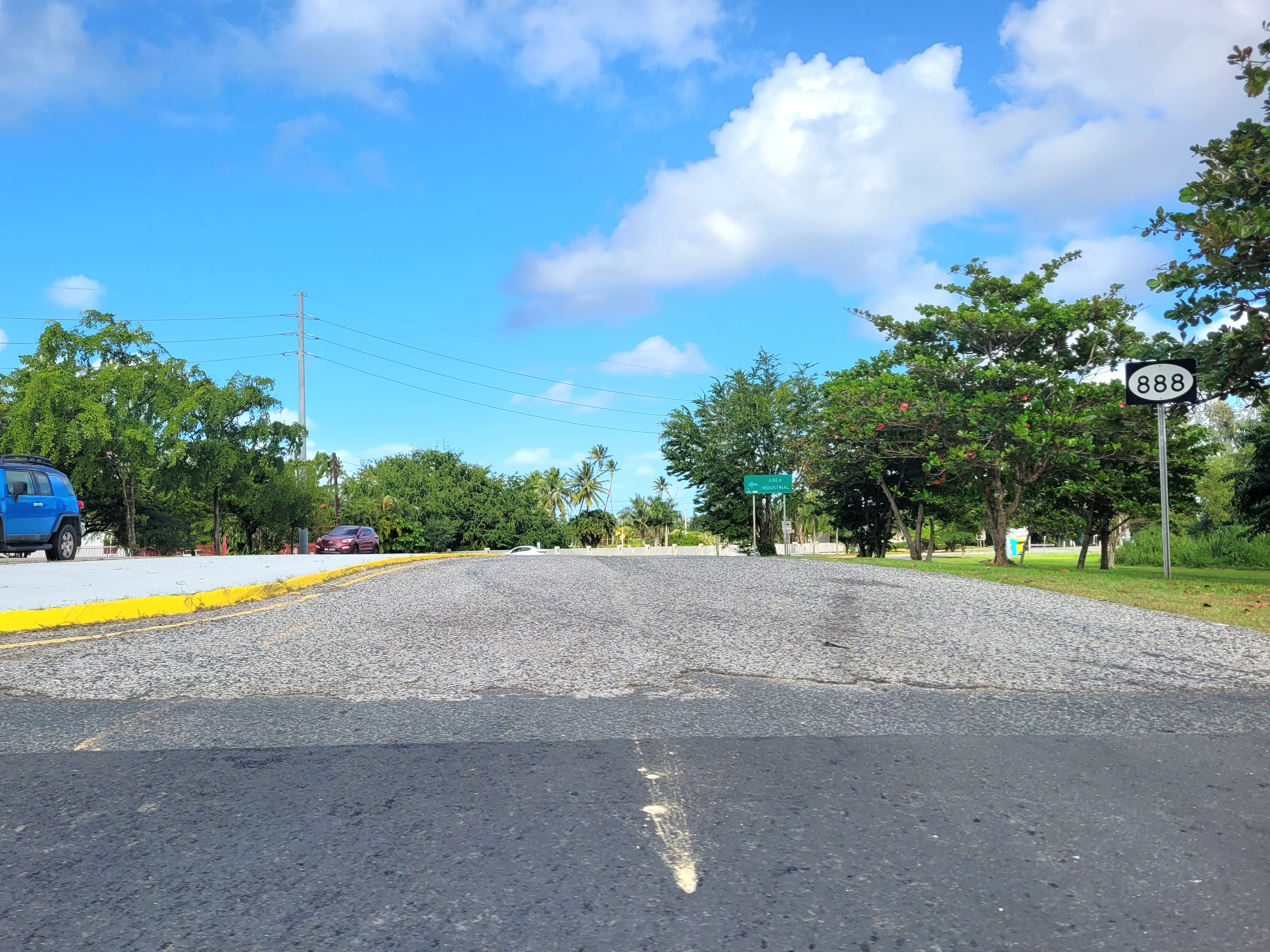
Puerto Rico Highway 888 in Palmas

== See also ==
- List of communities in Puerto Rico
- List of barrios and sectors of Cataño, Puerto Rico
