= Cataño barrio-pueblo =

Historical and administrative center (seat) of Cataño, Puerto Rico

Cataño barrio-pueblo Pueblo de Cataño
- Municipality Seat
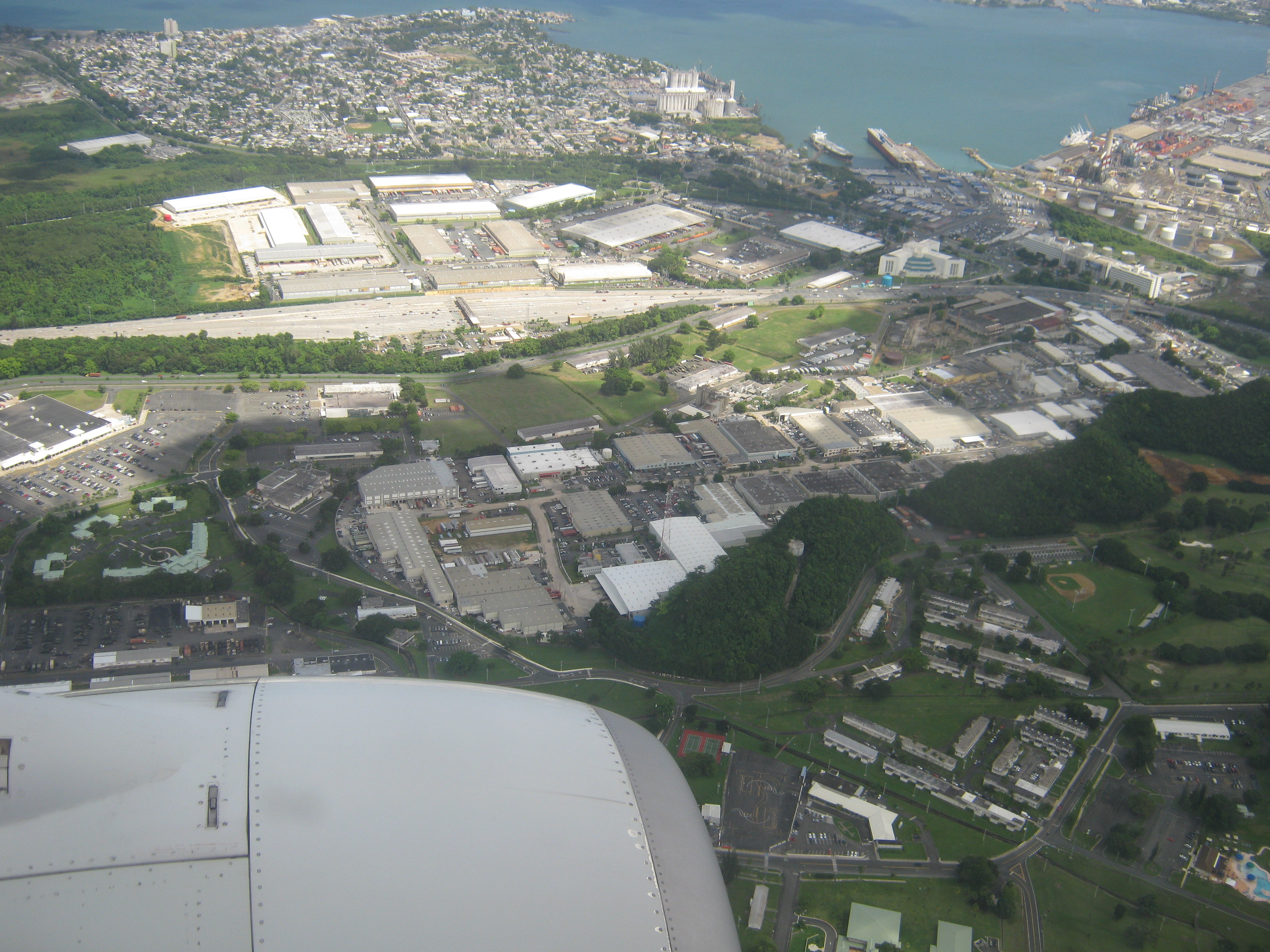
- Aerial view of Cataño barrio-pueblo

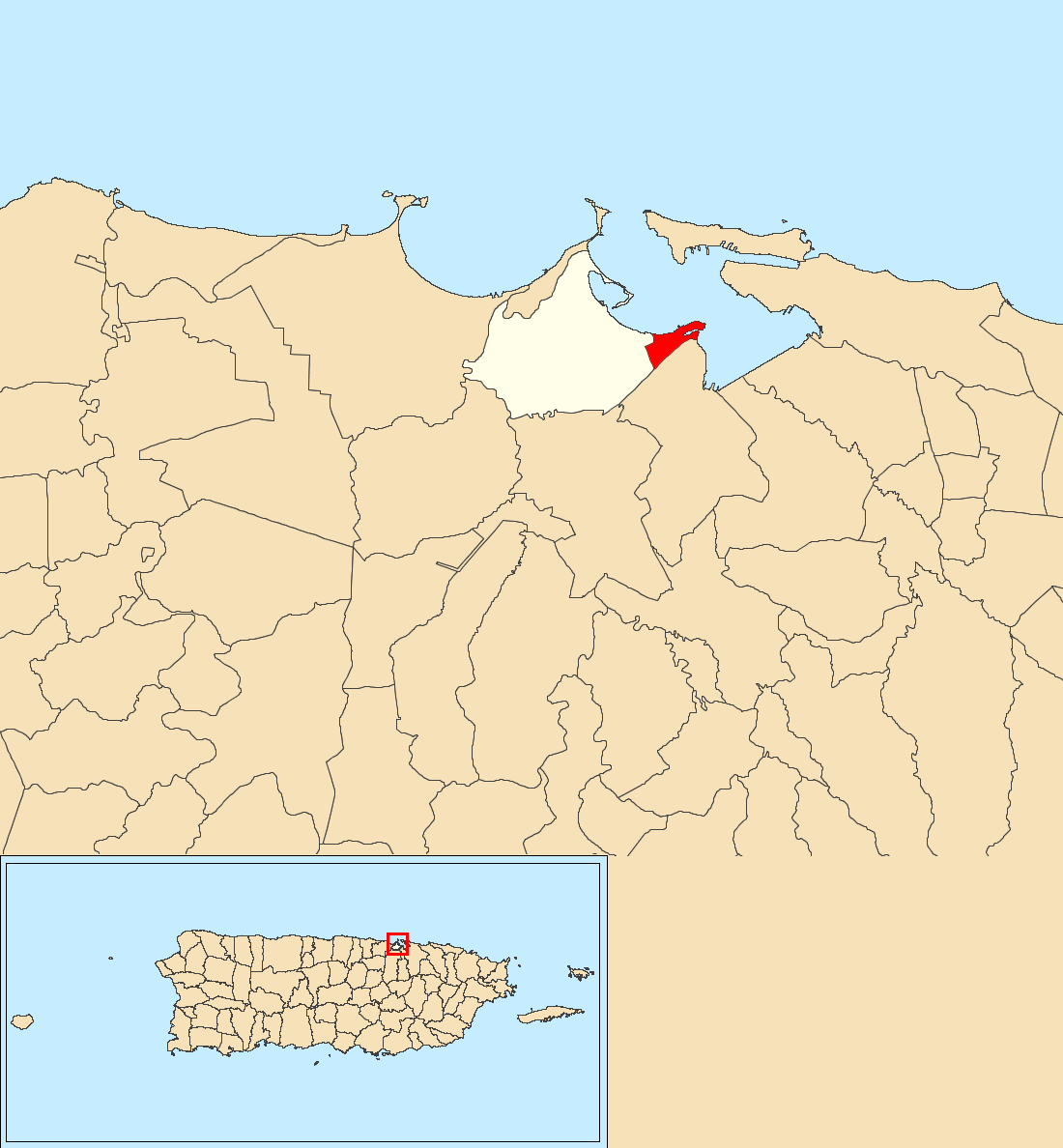
- Location of Cataño barrio-pueblo within the municipality of Cataño shown in red

- Location of Puerto Rico
- Coordinates: 18°26′36″N 66°06′59″W
- Commonwealth: Puerto Rico
- Municipality: Cataño

Area
  - Total: 1.05 sq mi (2.7 km^{2})
  - Land: 0.29 sq mi (0.75 km^{2})
  - Water: 0.76 sq mi (2.0 km^{2})
- Elevation: 0 ft (0 m)

Population (2010)
  - Total: 4,283
  - Density: 15,863/sq mi (6,125/km^{2})
- Source: 2010 Census
- Time zone: UTC−4 (AST)
- ZIP Codes: 00962, 00963
- Area code: 787/939

Cataño barrio-pueblo is an urban barrio and the administrative center (seat) of Cataño, a municipality of Puerto Rico. Its population in 2010 was 4,283. It is an urban barrio located in the northeastern section of the municipality.

As was customary in Spain, in Puerto Rico, the municipality has a barrio called pueblo which contains a central plaza, the municipal buildings (city hall), and a Catholic church. Fiestas patronales (patron saint festivals) are held in the central plaza every year.

== The central plaza and its church ==
The central plaza, or square, located in Cataño barrio-pueblo, is a place for official and unofficial recreational events and a place where people can gather and socialize from dusk to dawn. The Laws of the Indies, Spanish law, which regulated life in Puerto Rico in the early 19th century, stated the plaza's purpose was for "the parties" (celebrations, festivities) (Spanish: a propósito para las fiestas), and that the square should be proportionally large enough for the number of neighbors (Spanish: grandeza proporcionada al número de vecinos). These Spanish regulations also stated that the streets nearby should be comfortable portals for passersby, protecting them from the elements: sun and rain.

Located across the central plaza in Cataño barrio-pueblo is the Parroquia Nuestra Señora del Carmen, a Roman Catholic church.

== History ==
In July 2020, Federal Emergency Management Agency appropriated funds for repairs to Cataño's plaza.

== Features and demographics ==
Cataño barrio-pueblo has .29 square miles (0.75 km^{2}) of land area and .76 square miles (2.0 km^{2}) of water area. In 2010, its population was 4,283 with a population density of 15,863 inhabitants per square mile (6,125/km^{2}).

Historical population
Census	Pop.	Note	%±
1900	2,331		—
1910	4,786		105.3%
1920	6,602		37.9%
1930	7,044		6.7%
1940	7,924		12.5%
1950	9,182		15.9%
1960	8,276		−9.9%
1970	0		−100.0%
1980	4,596		—
1990	5,669		23.3%
2000	4,628		−18.4%
2010	4,283		−7.5%
U.S. Decennial Census; 1899 (shown as 1900) 1910-1930; 1930-1950 1980-2000 2010

== Sectors ==
Barrios (which are, in contemporary times, roughly comparable to minor civil divisions) in turn are further subdivided into smaller local populated place areas/units called sectores (sectors in English). The types of sectores may vary, from normally sector to urbanización to reparto to barriada to residencial, among others.

The following sectors are in Cataño barrio-pueblo:

Avenida Barbosa, Avenida Las Nereidas, Barriada Vietnam, Calles: Canals, Charca, Pasaje Puntillas, Prolongación Calle Tren, Recreo, San Antonio, San Fernando, Santa Rosa (from Avenida Las Nereidas to Prolongación Tren), Comunidad Amelia, Condominio Ciudad Feliz, Puerto Bello Apartments 105, Residencial Mantienzo Cintrón, and Sector Puntilla.

== Gallery ==
Places in Cataño barrio-pueblo:

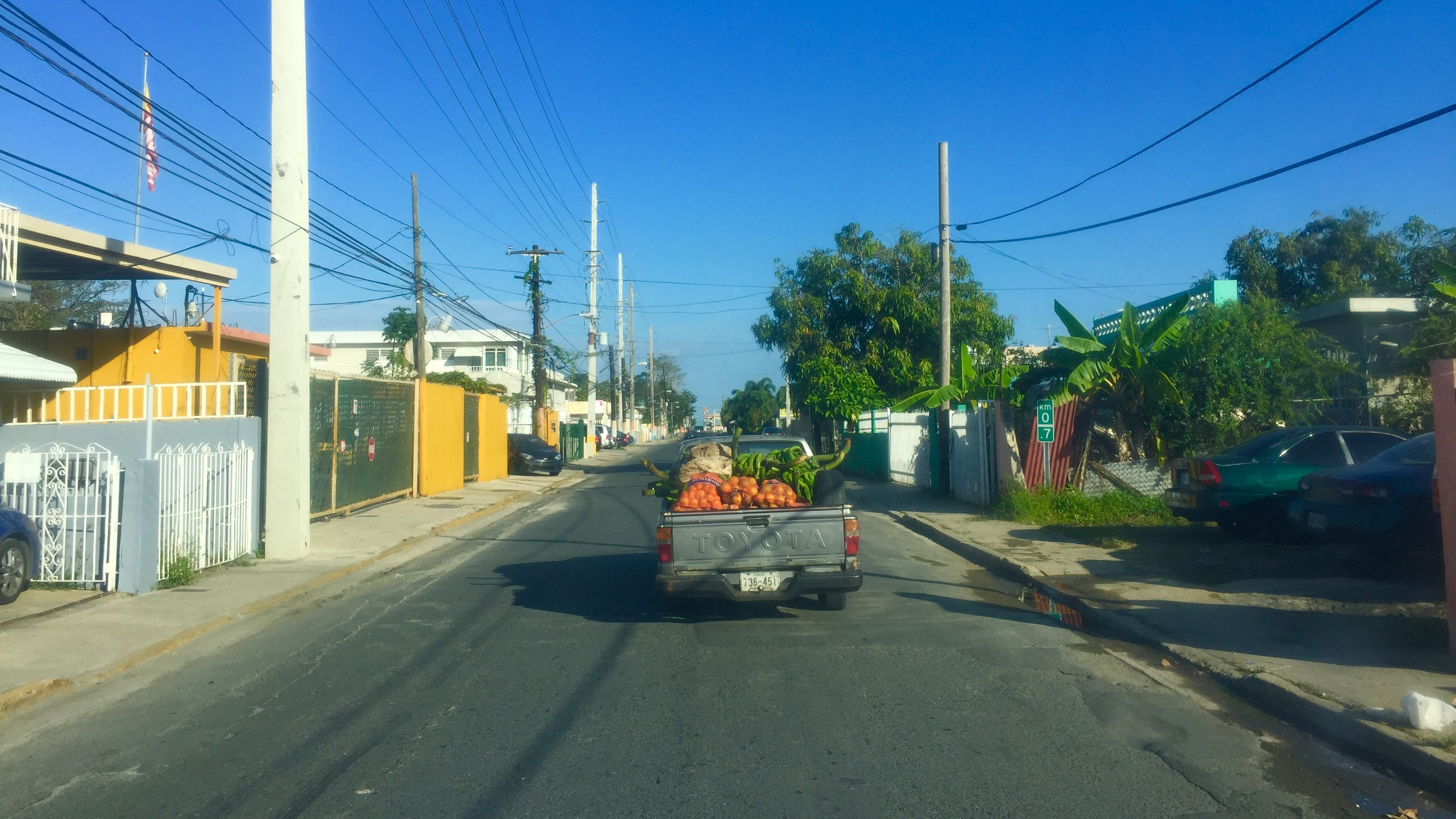

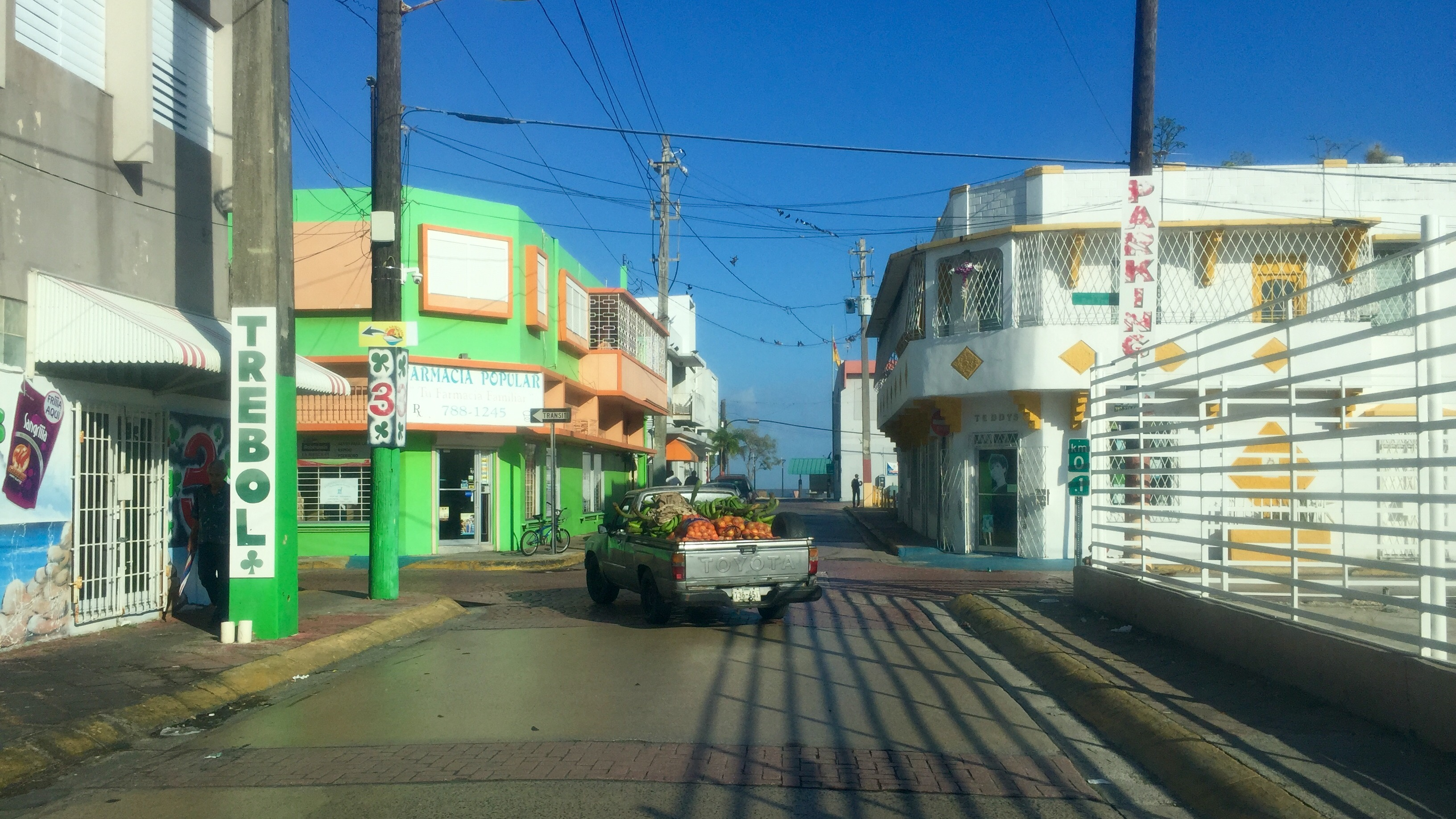

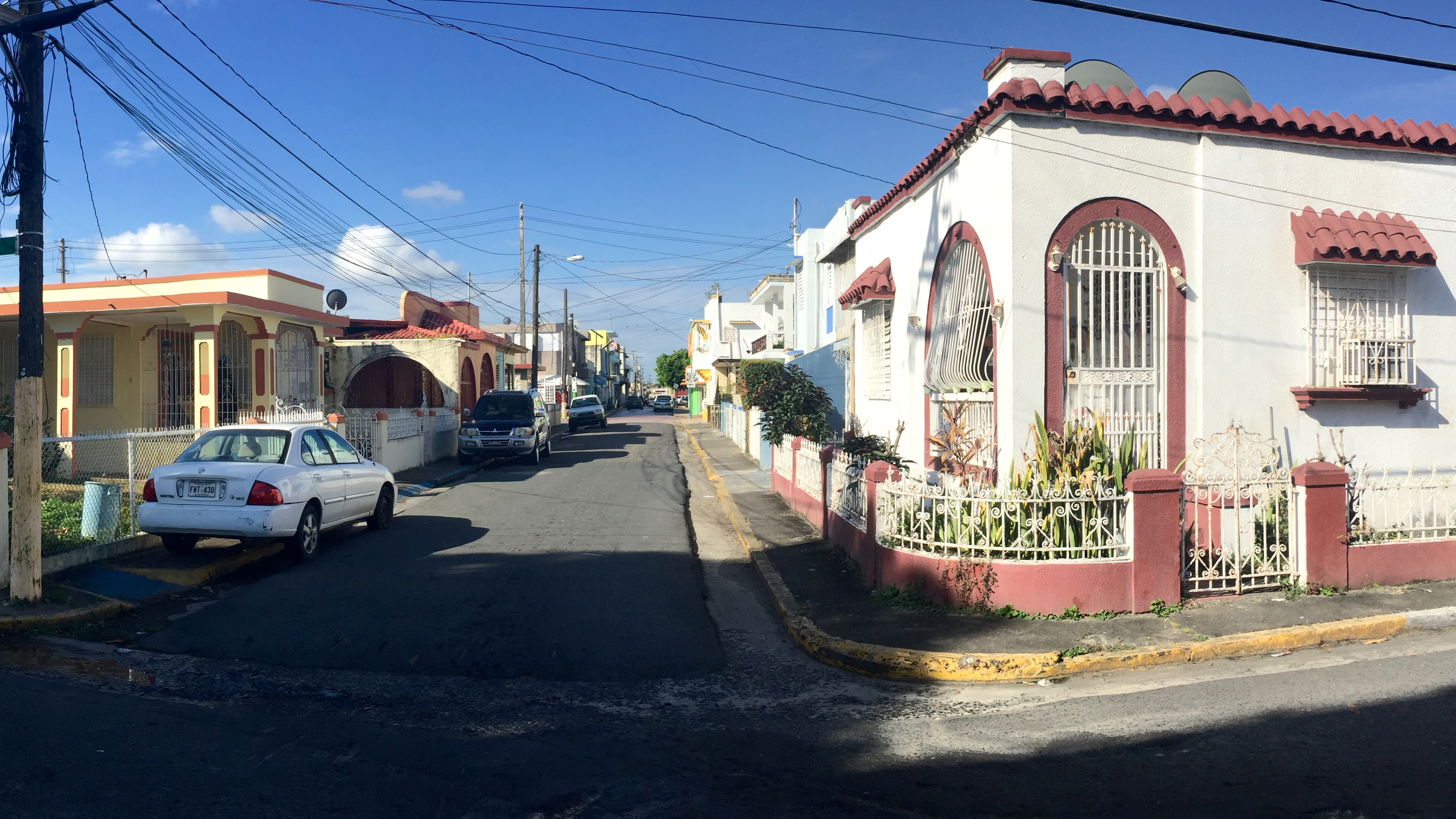

== See also ==
- List of communities in Puerto Rico
- List of barrios and sectors of Cataño, Puerto Rico
