= Cataño, Puerto Rico =

Town and municipality in Puerto Rico

Cataño Municipio Autónomo de Cataño
- Town and Municipality
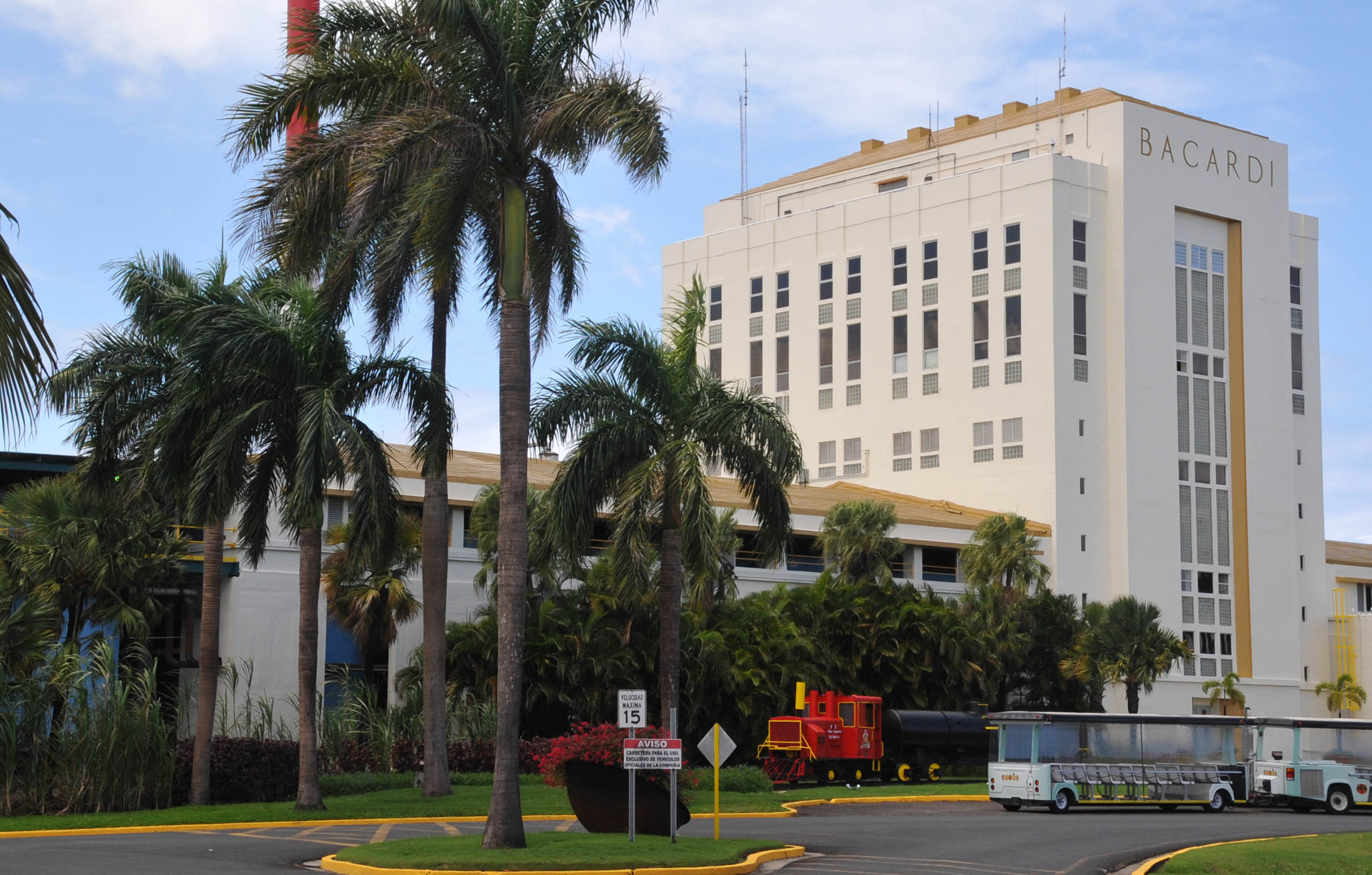
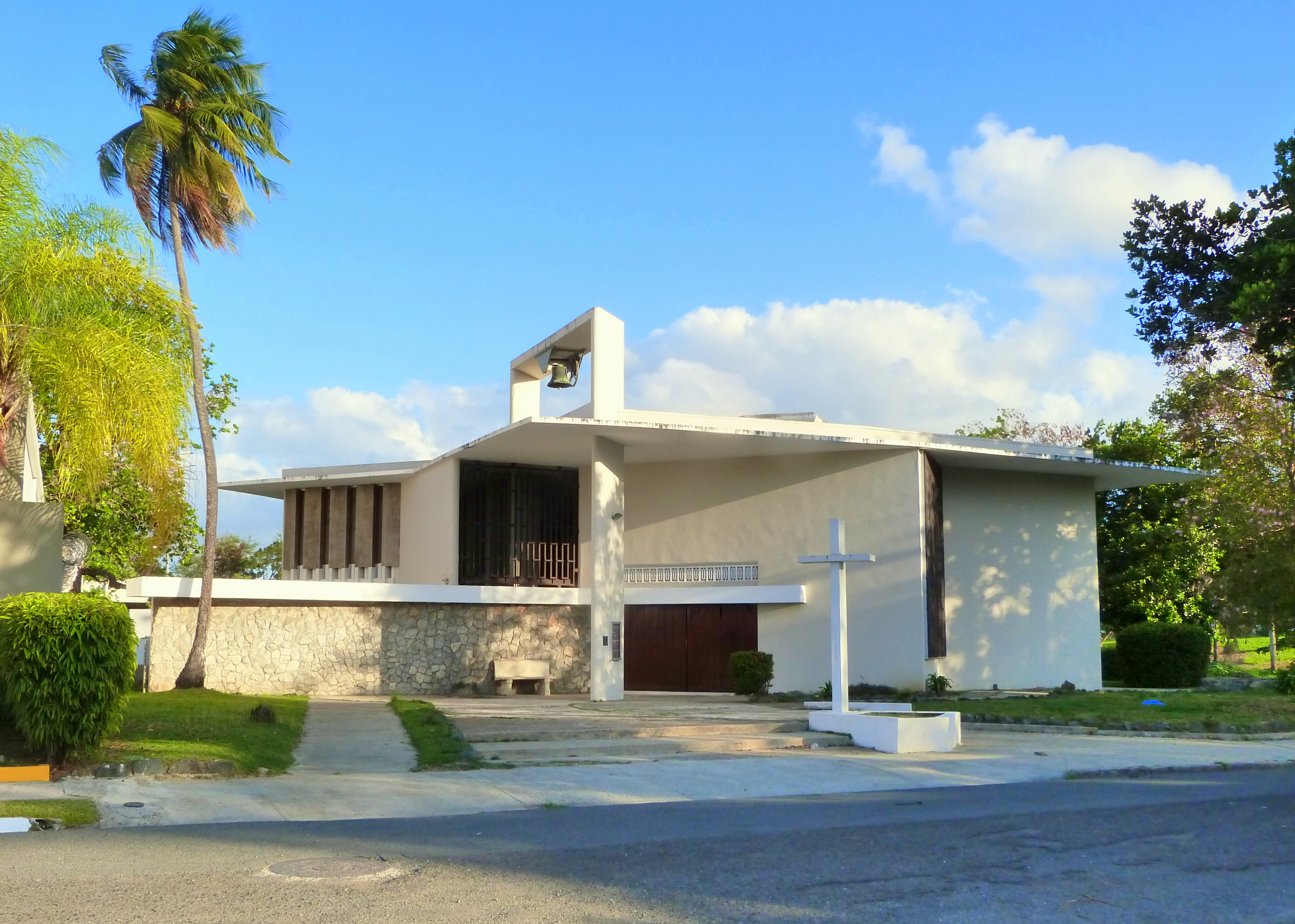
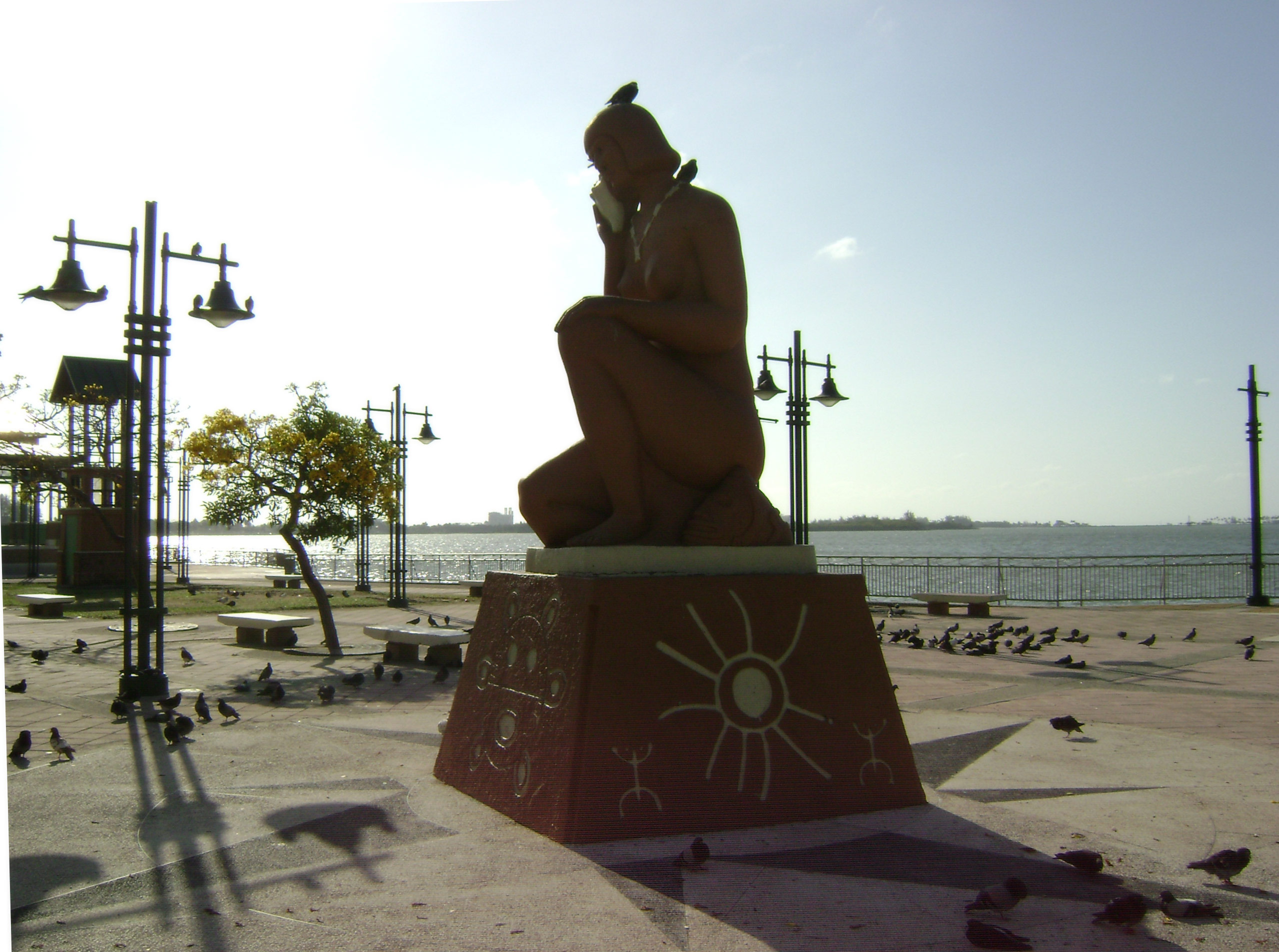
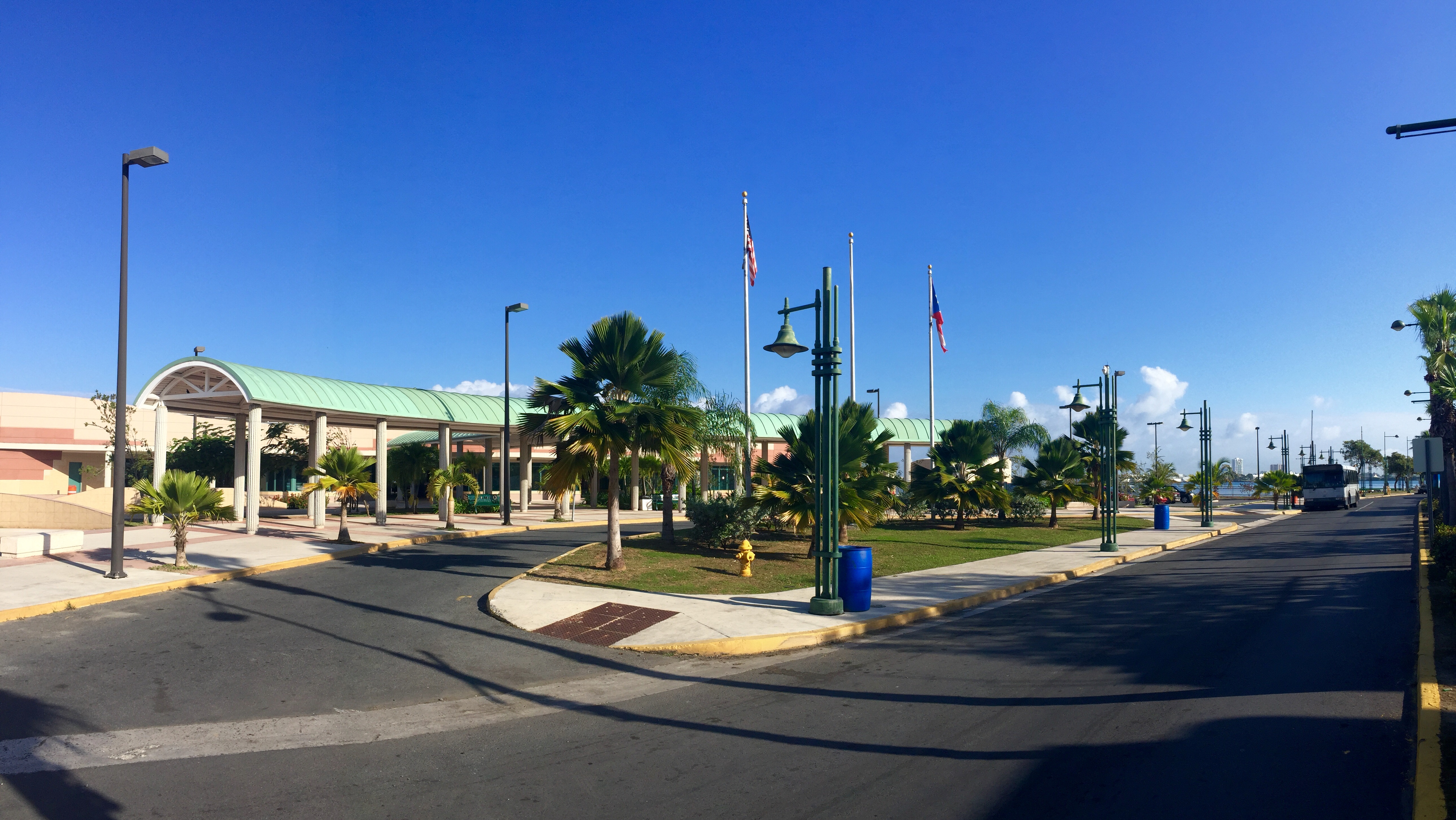
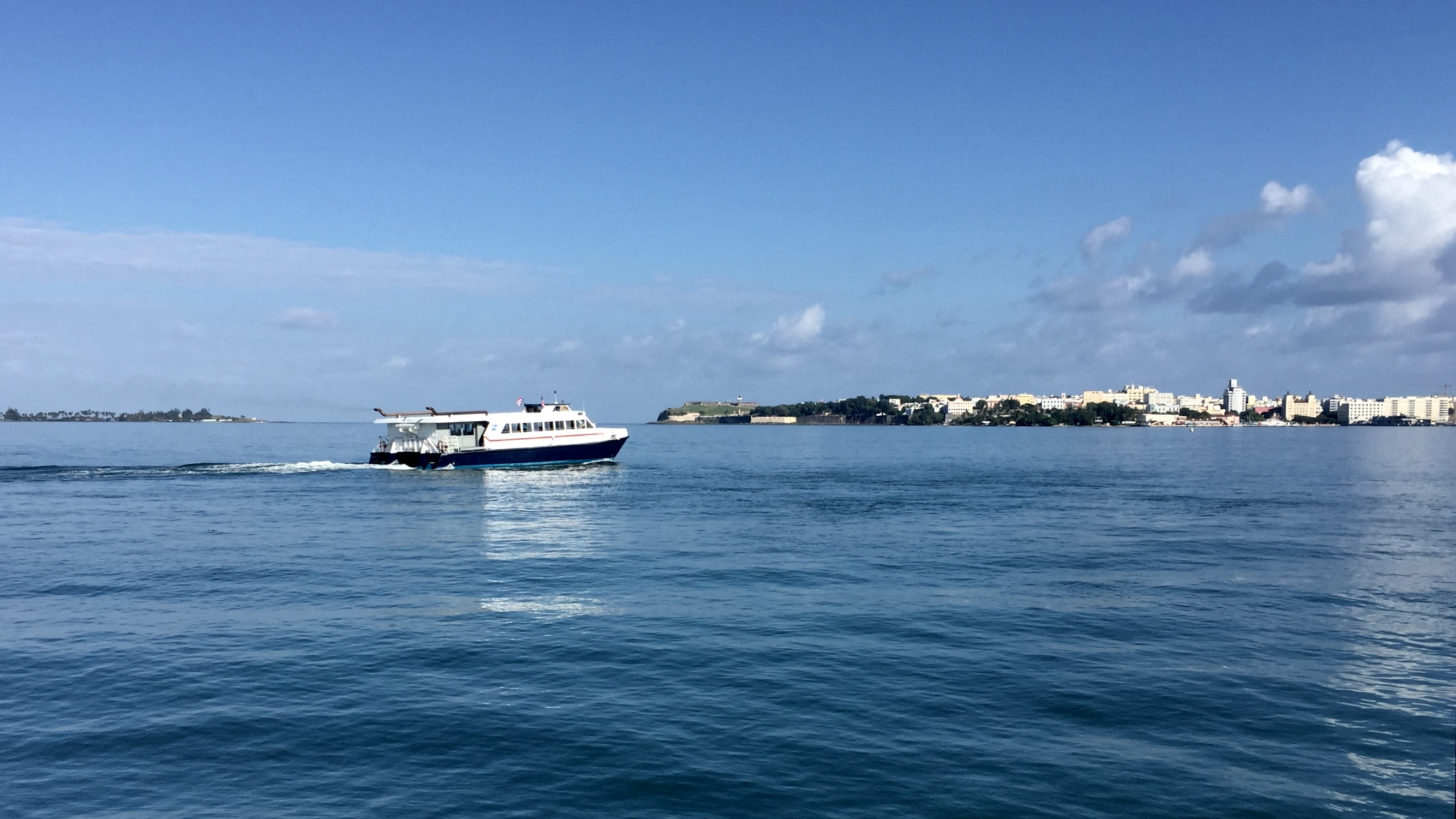
- Bacardi Cathedral of Rum Blessed Martín de Porres Sanctuary Taíno Monument Cataño Ferry Terminal San Juan Bay and Old San Juan from Cataño

- Flag Coat of arms
- Nicknames: "El Pueblo Que Se Negó a Morir", "La Antesala de la Capital", "El Pueblo Olvidado" "La Ciudad de un Nuevo Amanecer"
- Anthem: "Cataño"
- Interactive map of Cataño
- Coordinates: 18°26′42″N 66°07′04″W
- Sovereign state: United States
- Commonwealth: Puerto Rico
- Settled: late 17th century
- Founded: July 1, 1927
- Named for: Hernando de Cataño
- Barrios: 2 barrios: Cataño barrio-pueblo; Palmas

Government
  - Mayor: Hiram Torres Montalvo (PNP)
  - Senatorial dist.: 2 – Bayamón
  - Representative dist.: 9

Area
  - Total: 7.04 sq mi (18.23 km^{2})
  - Land: 4.8 sq mi (12.5 km^{2})
  - Water: 2.21 sq mi (5.73 km^{2})

Population (2020)
  - Total: 23,155
  - Estimate (2025): 21,701 ▼
  - Rank: 54th in Puerto Rico
  - Density: 4,800/sq mi (1,850/km^{2})
- Demonym: Catañese (neutral)
- Time zone: UTC−4 (AST)
- ZIP Codes: 00962, 00963
- Area code: 787/939
- Major routes: link = Puerto Rico Highway 22

Cataño (Spanish pronunciation: [kaˈtaɲo]) is a town and municipality on the northeastern coastal plain of Puerto Rico. It is west of the capital San Juan, east of Toa Baja, north of Bayamón and Guaynabo, and south of San Juan Bay. Part of the San Juan metropolitan area, Cataño is spread over 7 barrios and the downtown area and administrative center of Cataño Pueblo. It is the smallest municipality of Puerto Rico by land area.

== History ==
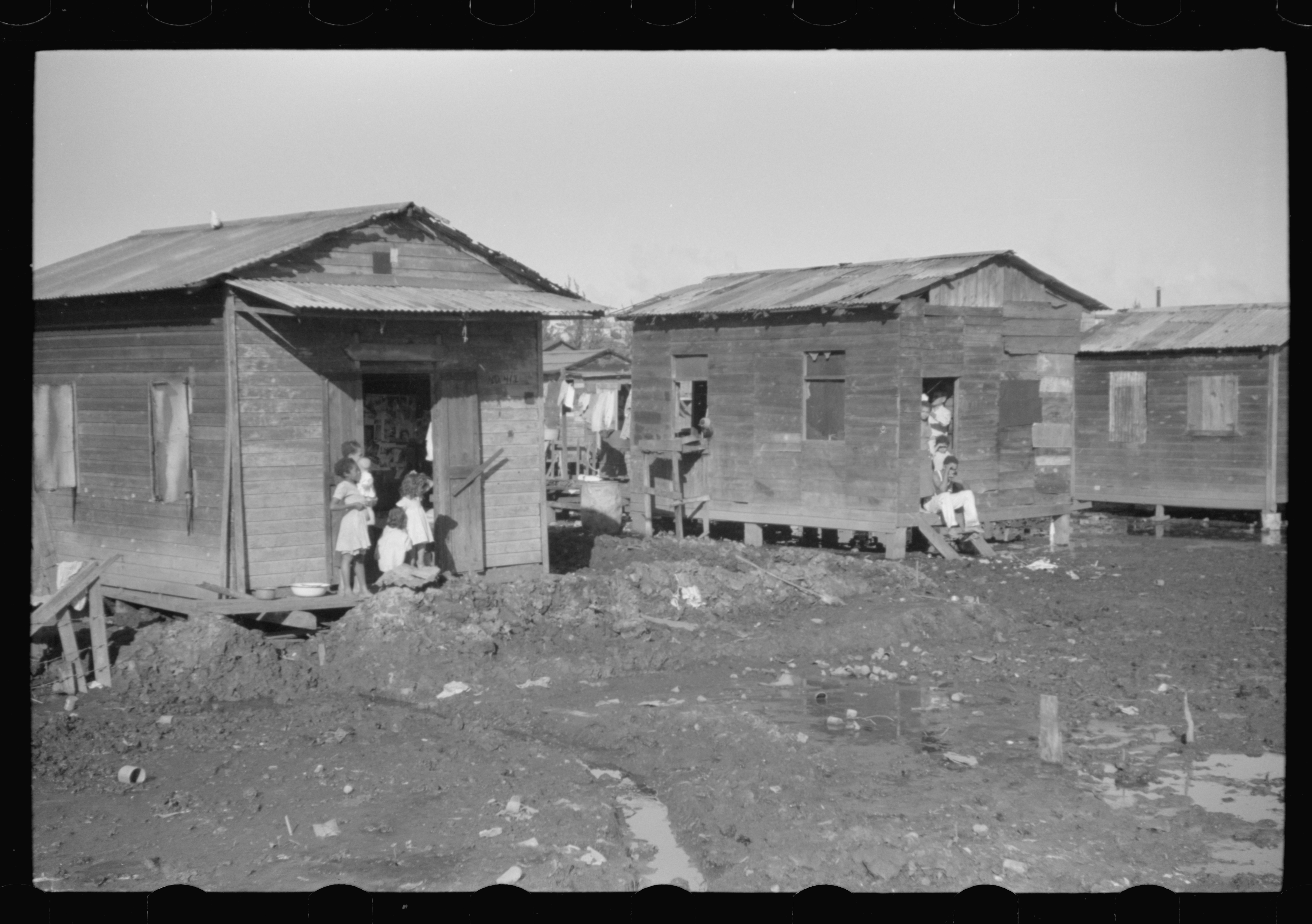
Houses in the slum area known as El Fanguito (fango means mud) in San Juan, Puerto Rico

Hernando de Cataño was chosen to offer his medical services in Puerto Rico during Francisco Bahamonde de Lugo's tenure as Governor of Puerto Rico (1564–1568). He was one of the first physicians who arrived in Puerto Rico during its colonization and, upon accepting his position, received as payment a piece of land across the San Juan islet. From that time, the region started to be recognized by the name of its original owner. As people started establishing in the area, Cataño was declared as a barrio of Bayamón. However, there wasn't much success in the town's development during these years due to its swamp-like terrain. Still, around 1690, a hermitage was established to allow residents to receive religious services without having to travel to Bayamón.

In the middle of the 19th century, a ferry company was founded to facilitate the transportation of merchandise and passengers through the San Juan Bay. This spurred a growth in the population of Cataño, transforming it into one of the most prosperous barrios of Bayamón. Still, attempts to separate themselves from Bayamón in 1839 were unsuccessful. On June 26, 1893, Bishop Antonio Puig y Montserrat separated the barrios of Cataño, Palo Seco, and Palmas from Bayamón's parish and established an independent parish for the residents of these sectors. In 1927, Cataño was officially declared a municipality with the name Hato de Palmas de Cataño, which over time was simply shortened to Cataño.

Politics played a crucial part in the foundation of the town, since Bayamón was controlled by an administration with opposing ideologies to those of the island's Legislature. The separation of Cataño from Bayamón was a strategy to weaken that opposition.

With only 12.5 square kilometres (4.8 sq mi) of territory, Cataño is the smallest municipality in Puerto Rico. It is less than half the size of Hormigueros, the next-smallest in area.

The people of Cataño were left in despair when Hurricane Maria struck on September 20, 2017, destroying their infrastructure and homes. With winds of 240 kilometres per hour (150 mph) the hurricane destroyed and flooded an estimated 650 homes and the roads became rivers (flooded). An estimated 80% of homes in the Juana Matos area of Cataño were destroyed.

== Geography ==
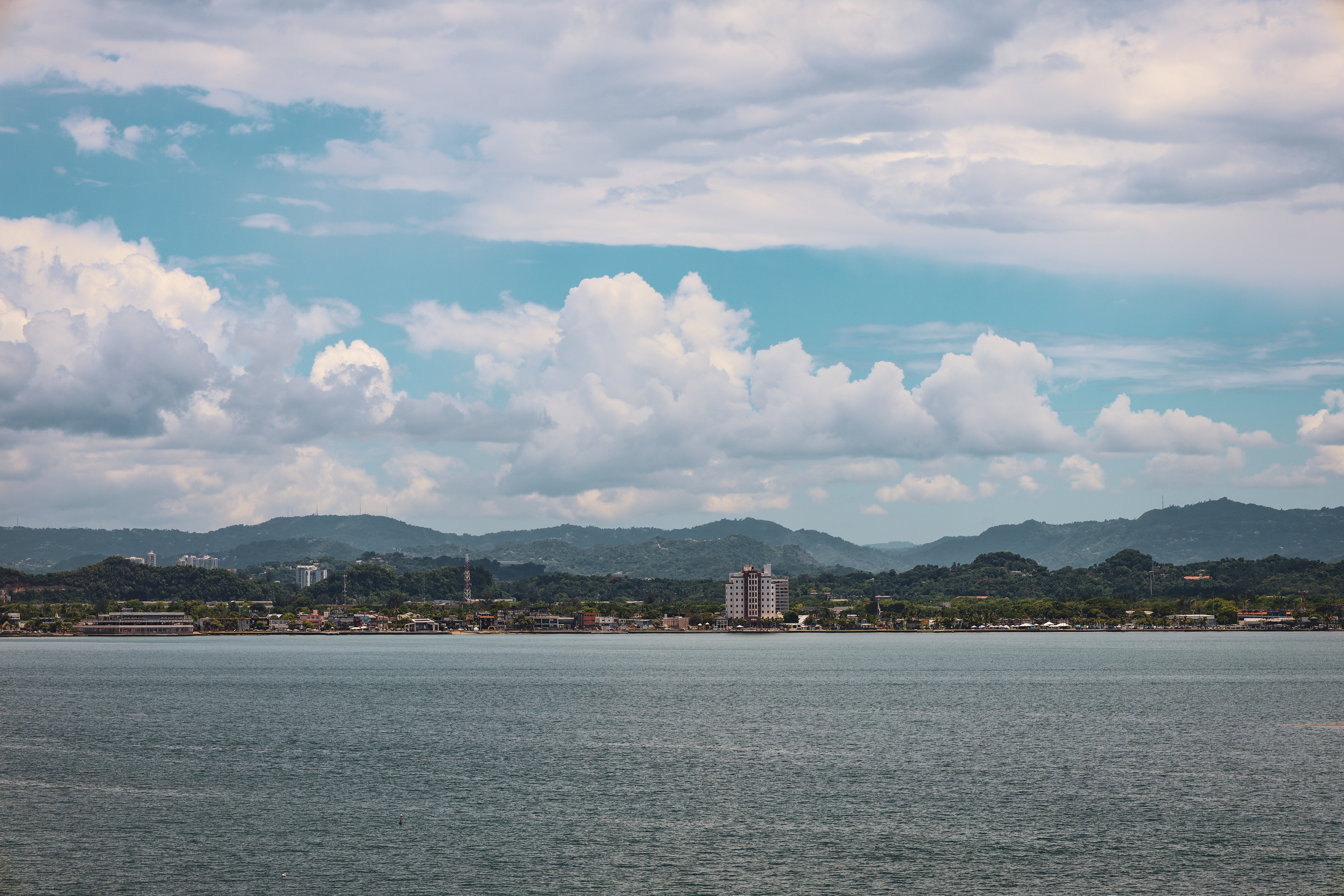
Cataño downtown from Old San Juan

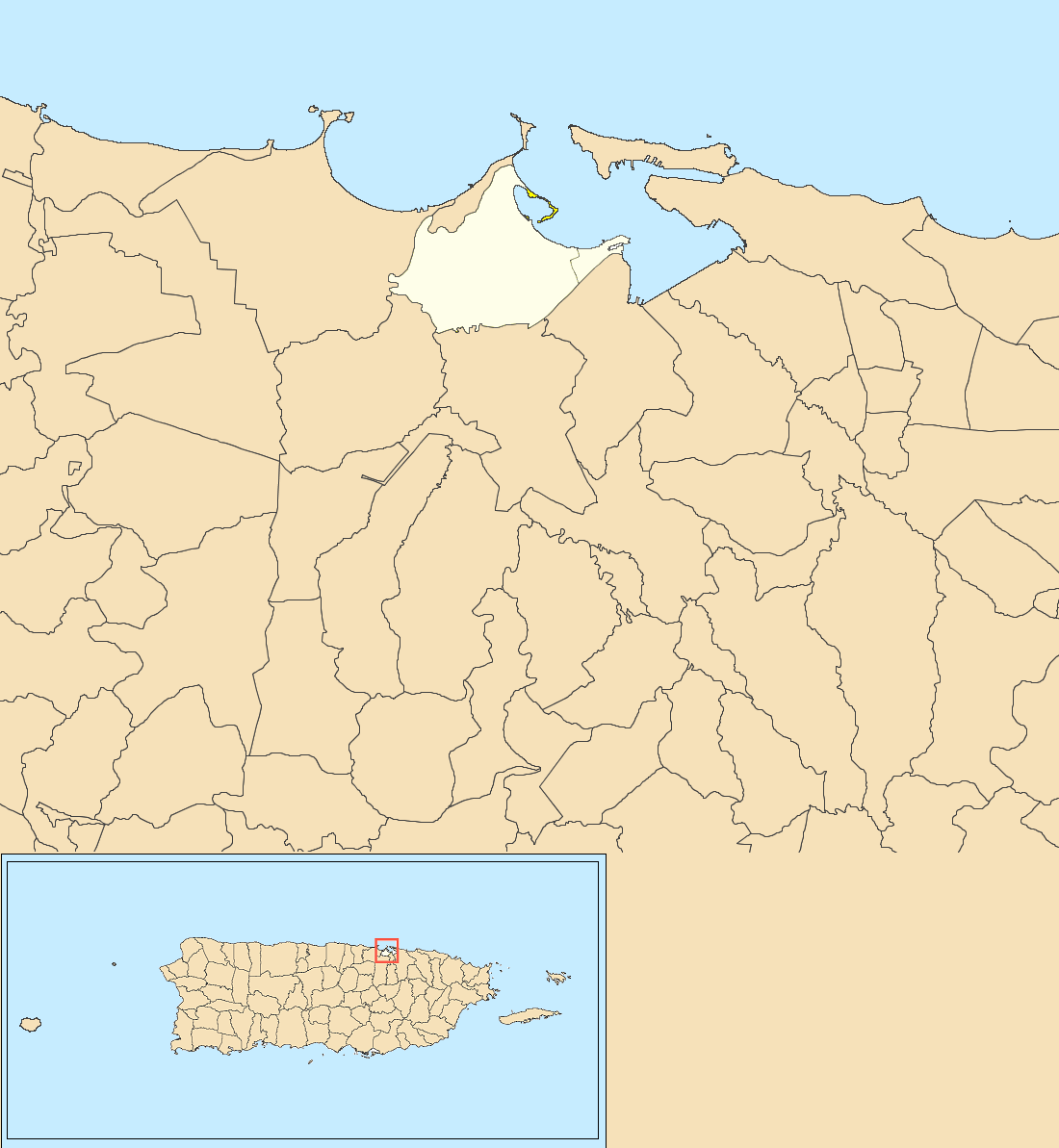
Subdivisions of Cataño

Cataño consists mostly of flat plains that belong to the Northern region of Puerto Rico. Its northern shore falls on the San Juan Bay of the Atlantic Ocean.

=== Bodies of water ===
Located in Cataño are a number of rivers, streams, named and unnamed creeks, and channels including:

- Caño La Malaria (Malaria Channel)
- Río de Bayamón
- Río Hondo

=== Barrios ===
Cataño is divided into only two barrios: Cataño barrio-pueblo, and Palmas.

=== Sectors ===
Barrios (which are, in contemporary times, roughly comparable to minor civil divisions) are further subdivided into smaller areas called sectores (sectors in English). The types of sectores may vary, from normally sector to urbanización to reparto to barriada to residencial, among others.

=== Special Communities ===
Comunidades Especiales de Puerto Rico (Special Communities of Puerto Rico) are marginalized communities whose citizens are experiencing a certain amount of social exclusion. A map shows these communities occur in nearly every municipality of the commonwealth. Of the 742 places that were on the list in 2014, the following barrios, communities, sectors, or neighborhoods were in Cataño: Cucharillas, Juana Matos, Puente Blanco, and Puntilla.

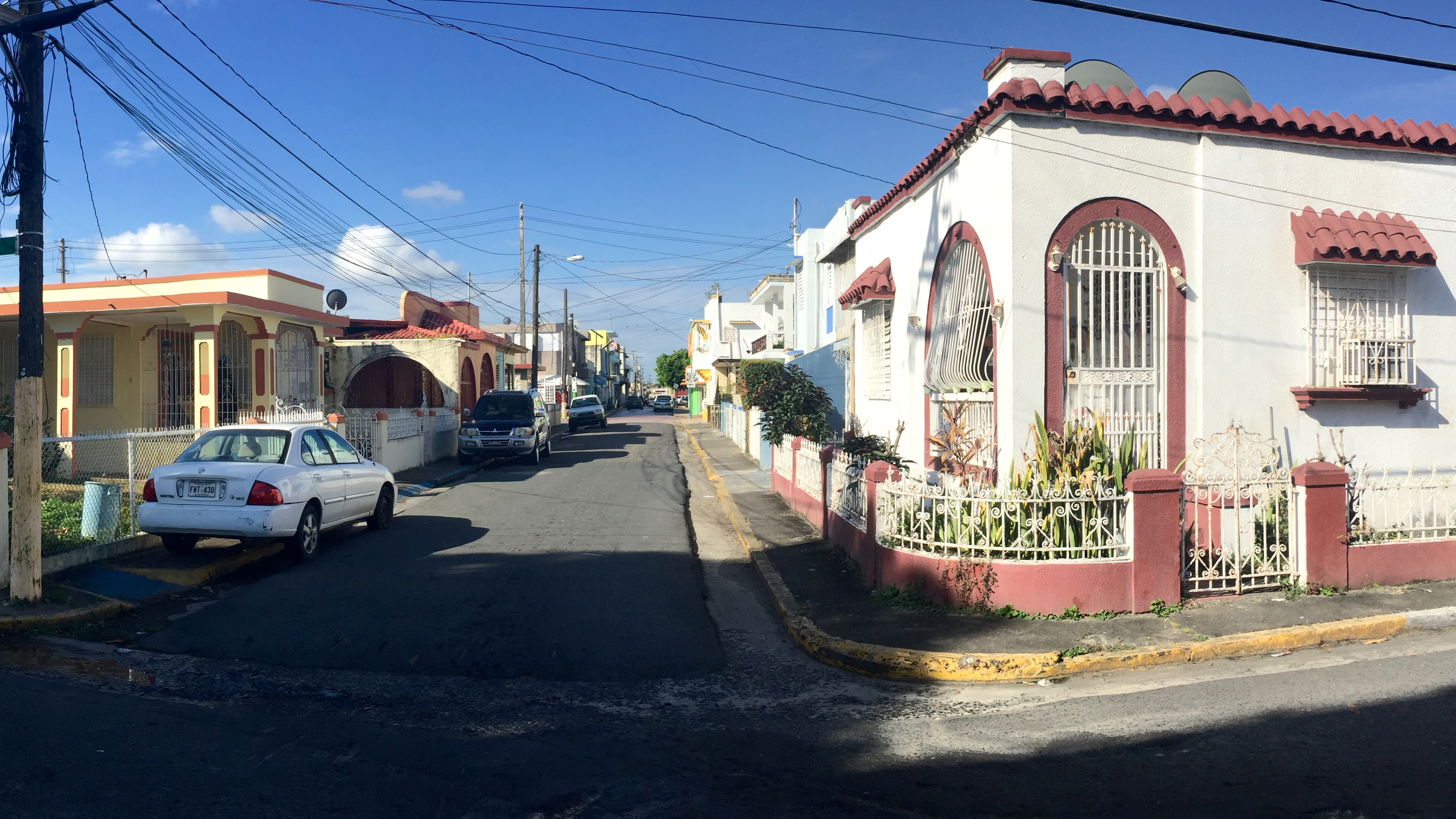
Homes in an urbanized part of town

== Culture ==
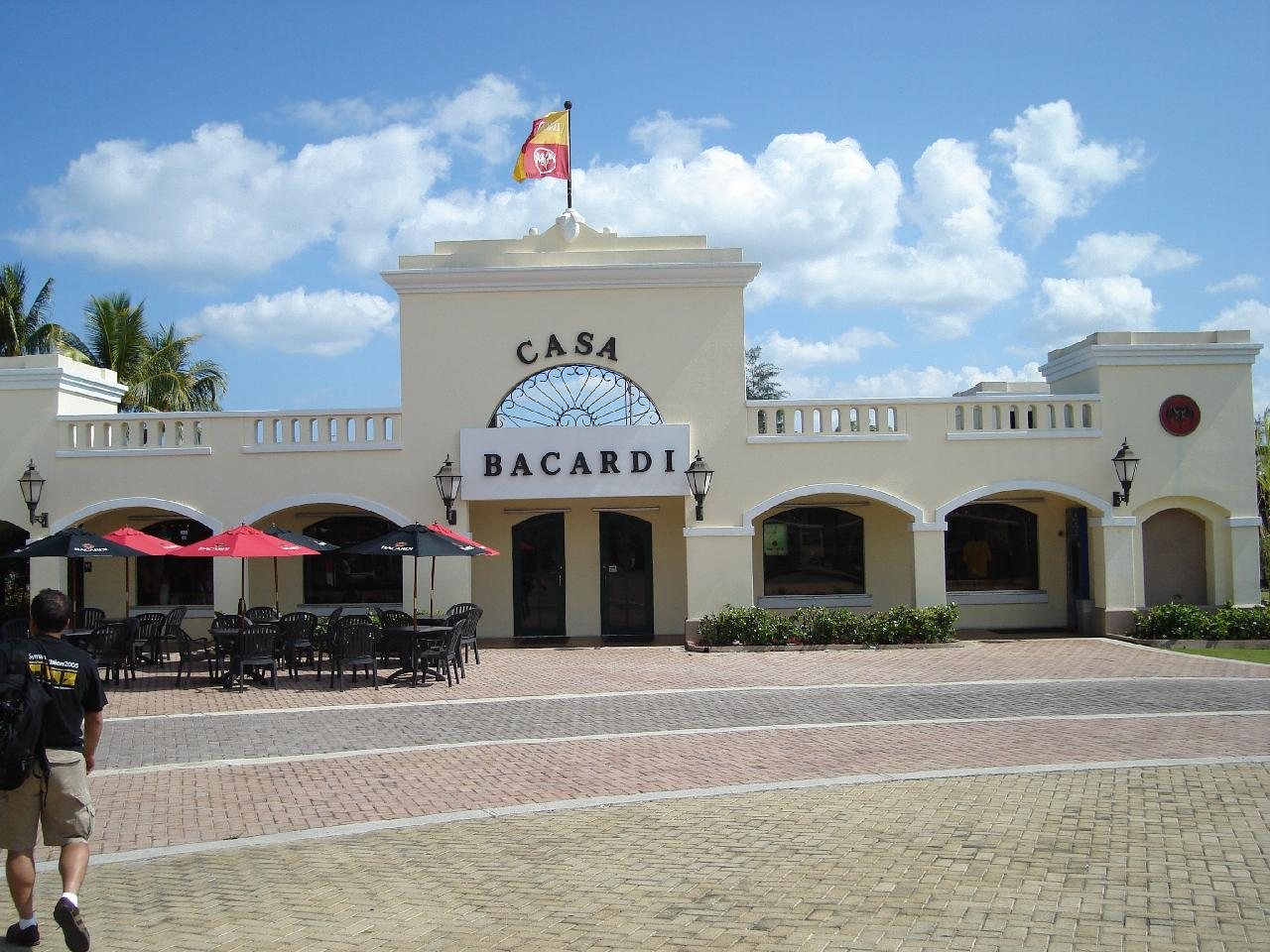
Entrance to tour of Bacardi in Cataño

=== Festivals and events ===
Cataño celebrates its patron saint festival in July. The Fiestas Patronales de Nuestra Sra. del Carmen is a religious and cultural celebration that generally features parades, games, artisans, amusement rides, regional food, and live entertainment.

=== Tourism ===
One of the main tourist attractions in Cataño is the boardwalk or tablado that commands a view of the San Juan Bay, including views of Fort San Felipe del Morro on the opposing side. There are several monuments and sculptures along the boardwalk, including a monument to Taíno culture called "India Taína".

The Bacardi Distillery also offers tours of its facilities to visitors who want to learn about the rum manufacturing industry in the island and the Caribbean.

To stimulate local tourism, the Puerto Rico Tourism Company launched the Voy Turistiendo ("I'm Touring") campaign, with a passport book and website. The Cataño page lists Lancha de Cataño, Malecón de Cataño, and Casa Bacardí, as places of interest.

==== Christopher Columbus statue ====
The town gained notoriety in 1998, when Mayor Edwin Rivera Sierra traveled to Russia and acquired a huge statue of Christopher Columbus called "Birth of the New World". The statue Columbus by Tsereteli was designed by artist Zurab Tsereteli and would measure 350 feet (110 m) when erected. Tsereteli had offered the statue to the United States as a gift in 1992 with the intention to use it for the celebrations of the 500th year of its voyage. However, it was rejected. The transportation of the statue from Russia to Cataño cost $2.4 million. After arriving on the island, the 2,700 bronze pieces of the statue were scattered in a terrain awaiting for funds for the project, but Rivera Sierra was unable to garner enough public support or funding for it. The statue was installed in Arecibo.

=== Sports ===
Cataño has a number of professional sports teams, and there are several important sports facilities located in the town, including the Perucho Cepeda Stadium, the Pedro Rodríguez Gaya Boxing Coliseum, and the Cosme Beitía Salamo Coliseum.

== Economy ==
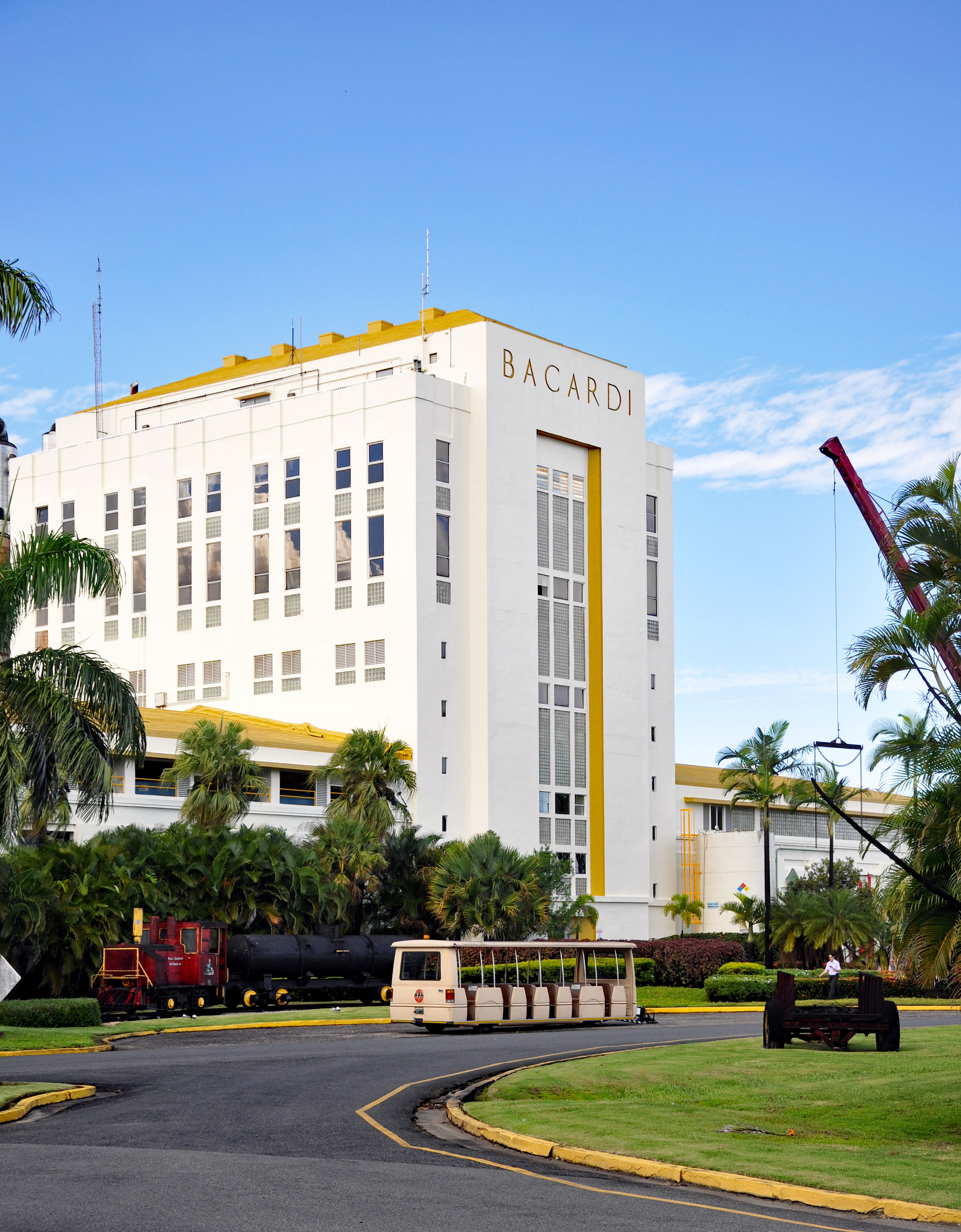
Bacardi factory, located in Cataño

Due to its location, Cataño has always played an important role as a port to the island. Fishing has also been a main source of economy for centuries. Bacardi, one of the largest rum manufacturers of the world, has a distillery in Cataño.

Other industries established in the town are refineries, commerce companies, transport and logistics, among others.

== Demographics ==
Historical population
Census	Pop.	Note	%±
1930	8,504		—
1940	9,719		14.3%
1950	19,865		104.4%
1960	25,208		26.9%
1970	26,459		5.0%
1980	26,243		−0.8%
1990	34,587		31.8%
2000	30,071		−13.1%
2010	28,140		−6.4%
2020	23,155		−17.7%
2025 (est.)	21,701	▼	−6.3%
U.S. Decennial Census; 1930; 1930–1950 1960–2000 2010 2020

Despite its small size, Cataño has a large population when compared to municipalities of similar areas. This is perhaps due to its location near the capital of San Juan. The population, according to the 2000 census, was 30,071 with a population density of 2,322.1 peopleper square kilometre (6,014.2 people /mi^{2}). Although the current population is almost the double of what it was in the 1950 census, the current census reflects a small decrease of inhabitants.

As a whole, Puerto Rico is populated mainly by people from a Mulatto (Of African and European descent) and European descent, with small groups of African and Asian people. Statistics taken from the 2000 census shows that 66.9% of Catañenses have Spanish or White ancestry, 8.6% are black, 0.8% are Amerindian etc.

Race – Cataño, Puerto Rico – 2000 Census
Race	Population	% of Total
White	20,427	67.9%
Black/African American	2,279	7.6%
American Indian and Alaska Native	226	0.8%
Asian	58	0.2%
Native Hawaiian/Pacific Islander	7	0.0%
Some other race	1,839	6.1%
Two or more races	5,235	17.4%

== Government ==
After its initial establishment, Cataño belonged to the Bayamón region. From 1839 to 1845, there were some attempts to separate the barrio from Bayamón, but these were unsuccessful. However, on late 19th century, Bishop Antonio Puig y Montserrat managed to separate Cataño establishing their own parish. Cataño was finally declared a municipality on April 25, 1927, being its first mayor Alberto Dávila.

In 1987, Edwin Rivera Sierra was elected as Mayor of Cataño. He remained in the position for 16 years, quitting in 2003. He was replaced by Wilson Soto, who was then officially elected at the 2004 elections in Puerto Rico. After losing a reelection bid in 2008 against José Rosario, Soto was indicted on nine charges.

The current mayor of Cataño is Julio Alicea Vasallo, of the New Progressive Party (PNP) who has served as mayor since December 19, 2021 after the resignation of former mayor Felix "El Cano" Delgado. Alicea Vasallo was then subsequently elected at the 2024 general elections.

The city belongs to the Puerto Rico Senatorial district II, which is represented by two senators. Migdalia Padilla and Carmelo Ríos Santiago have served as district senators since 2005.

== Symbols ==
The municipio has an official flag and coat of arms.

=== Flag ===
The flag consists of nine horizontal stripes: four blue stripes and five white stripes (substituting for the silver color on the coat of arms). A white and green band traverses diagonally the drape in all its extension, from the upper hoist to the lower fly.

The green color represents the palm trees that are also present in the coat of arms. The flag was officially adopted during José Alvarez Brunet's tenure as mayor on September 5, 1974.

=== Coat of arms ===
The coat of arms of Cataño consists of nine horizontal stripes of same the width: four blue and five silver. The colors of the coat and the flag represent the coat of arms of the family of Don Hernando de Cataño, an Hidalgo to whom the town owes its name. The color silver represents nobility and the color blue was used by hidalgos on their armories. It symbolizes royalty and serenity.

On top of the coat of arms, there's a crown with three towers distinct of others coat of arms. The coat itself is surrounded by two green palm trees, an allusion to one of the original names of the town: Hato de las Palmas de Cataño.

=== Name ===
Aside of its name, derived from its original owner, Cataño has several nicknames. The city is known as "La Antesala de la Capital" (the Foyer of the Capital) because of its location across the bay from the capital-city of San Juan. In the 1960s, the residents of Cataño jokingly called it "Fanguito Town" because of its many muddy streets and shacks built on stilts over tidal flats.

== Education ==
Cataño has several public and private schools managed by the Puerto Rico Department of Education.

== Transportation ==
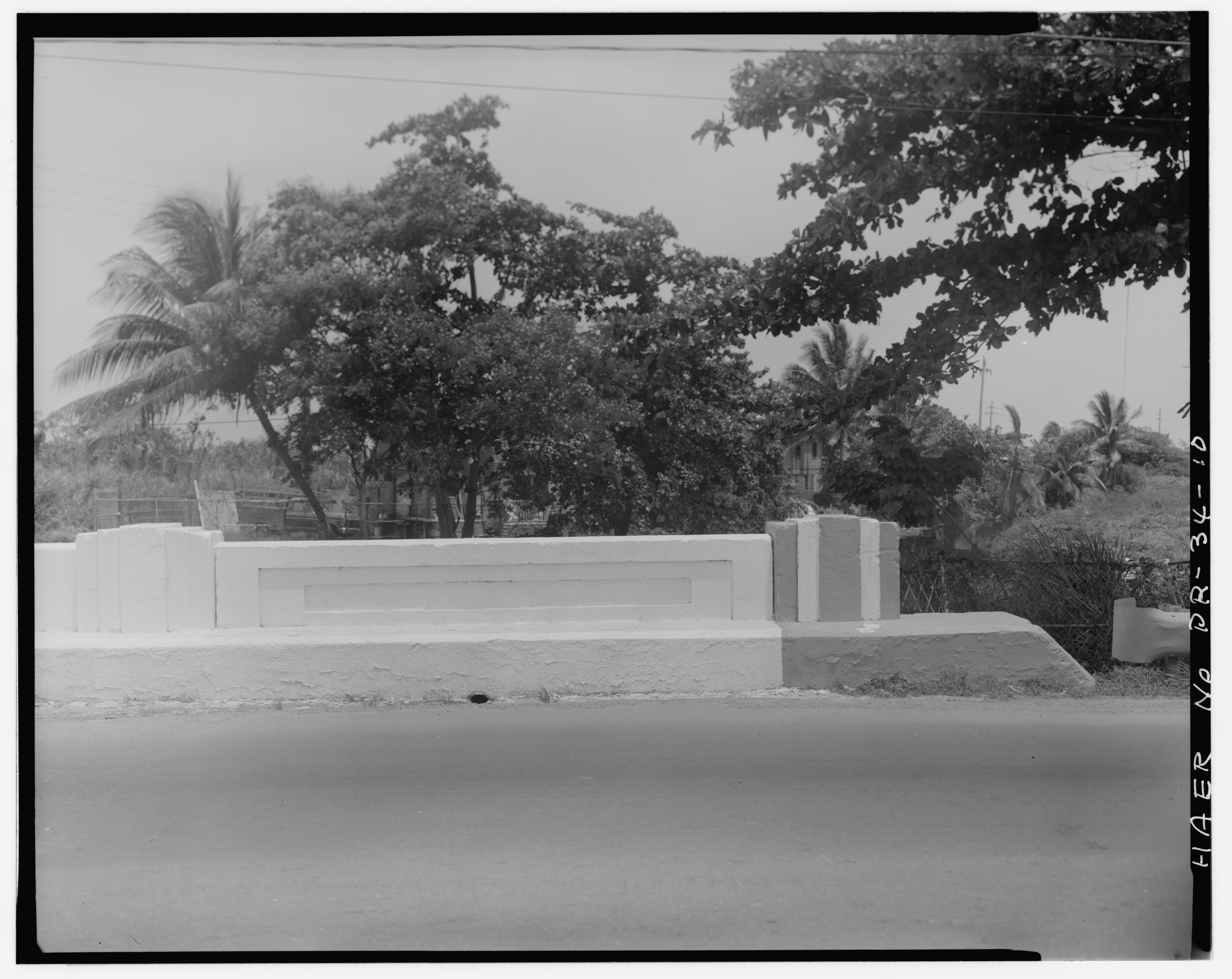
Puente Blanco Bridge, Barrio Palmas neighborhood, Cataño, Cataño Municipio, PR

Puerto Rico Highway 22 provides access to Cataño from San Juan or from other adjacent towns. Like most other towns in the island, it has a public transportation system consisting of public cars. Taxis are also available around the town.

Cataño also has a ferry service known as La Lancha de Cataño, or the Ferry of Cataño. The ferry service, which has been working since 1853, operates a five-minute harbor route between Cataño and Old San Juan, and vice versa daily. There is a large ferry terminal at Cataño, and tourists can enjoy the view of the Castillo del Morro and the large cruise ships docked at the old San Juan terminal during this journey.

There are 16 bridges in Cataño.

== Gallery ==
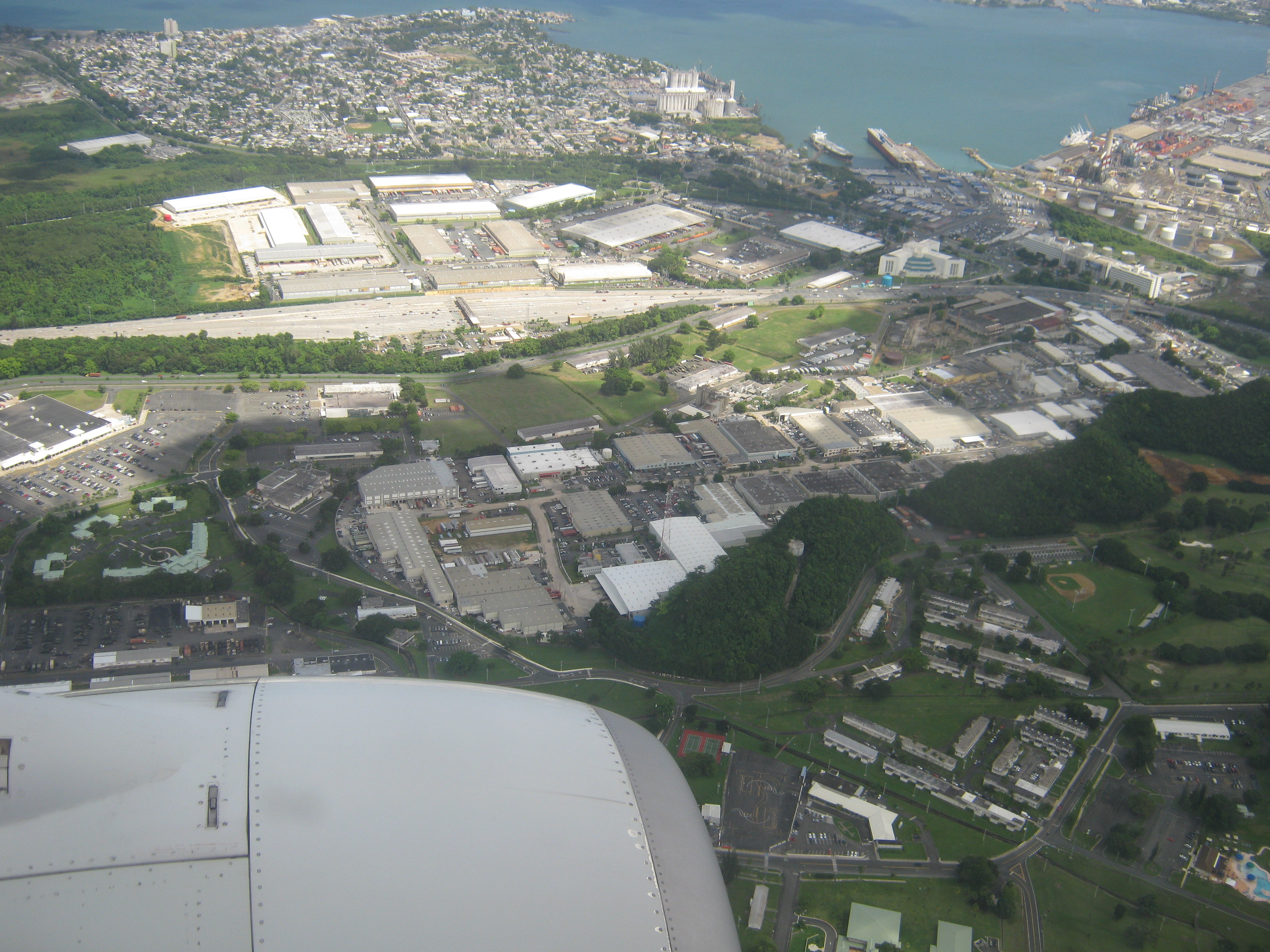
Aerial view of northeastern Cataño (upper left)

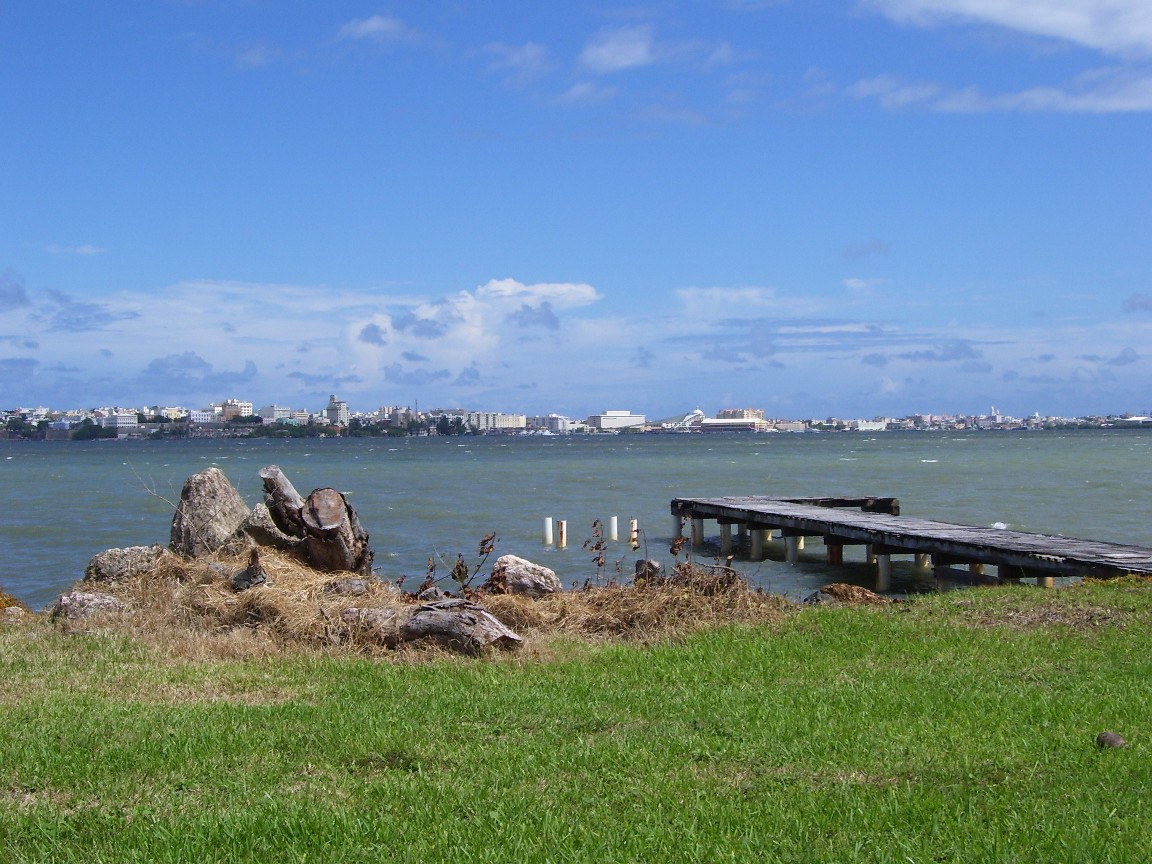
View of the San Juan Bay, Old San Juan, and Santurce from the Cataño shore

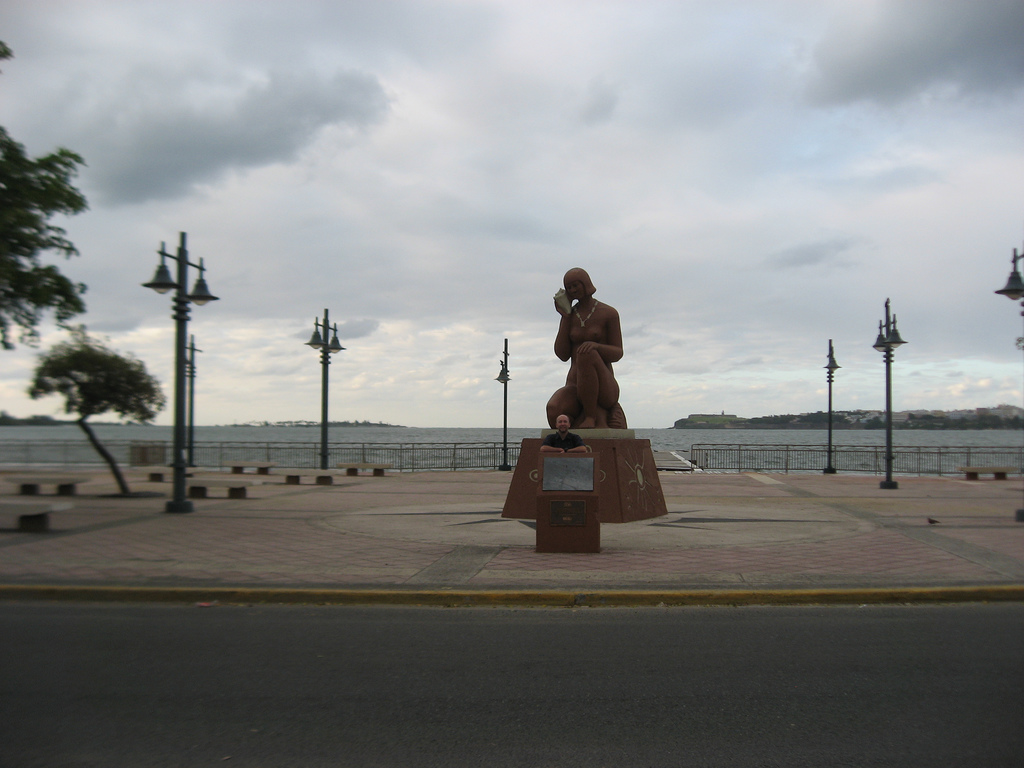
Monument to Taíno Culture, most commonly known as India Taína (Taíno Indian Woman)

== See also ==
- List of Puerto Ricans
- History of Puerto Rico
