= Puerto Rico Highway 823 =

Highway in Puerto Rico

Highway 823
- Ruta 823

Route information
- Maintained by Puerto Rico DTPW
- Length: 7.2 km (4.5 mi)

Major junctions
- West end: PR-677 / PR-679 in Espinosa
- PR-820 in Río Lajas; PR-142 in Río Lajas; PR-806 in Quebrada Arenas
- East end: PR-165 in Galateo–Contorno

Location
- Country: United States
- Territory: Puerto Rico
- Municipalities: Dorado, Toa Alta

Highway system
- Roads in Puerto Rico; List
| ← PR-821 | → PR-862 |

Puerto Rico Highway 823 (PR-823) is a rural road located between the municipalities of Dorado and Toa Alta in Puerto Rico. With a length of 7.2 kilometers (4.5 mi), it begins at its intersection with PR-165 on the Contorno–Galateo line in Toa Alta, and ends at its junction with PR-677 and PR-679 in Espinosa barrio in Dorado.

== Route description ==
Due to its rural characteristics, PR-823 has a single lane per direction in the entire length. In Dorado, it has a short length that extends from its intersection with PR-677 and PR-679 in Espinosa barrio to the Río Lajas, that serves as the municipal limit for Dorado and Toa Alta. In Toa Alta, PR-823 goes to the south through Río Lajas barrio from the Dorado municipal limit to PR-820, where it turns to the east. After PR-820 intersection, PR-823 meets with PR-142, with which it concurs for approximately one kilometer (0.62 mi) in a southerly direction. Then, it continues to the east, passing through Quebrada Arenas barrio, where it intersects with PR-806 before crossing the Quebrada Arenas River. After the river, PR-823 serves as the boundary for Contorno and Galateo barrios until its eastern terminus at PR-165 junction.

Puerto Rico Highway 823

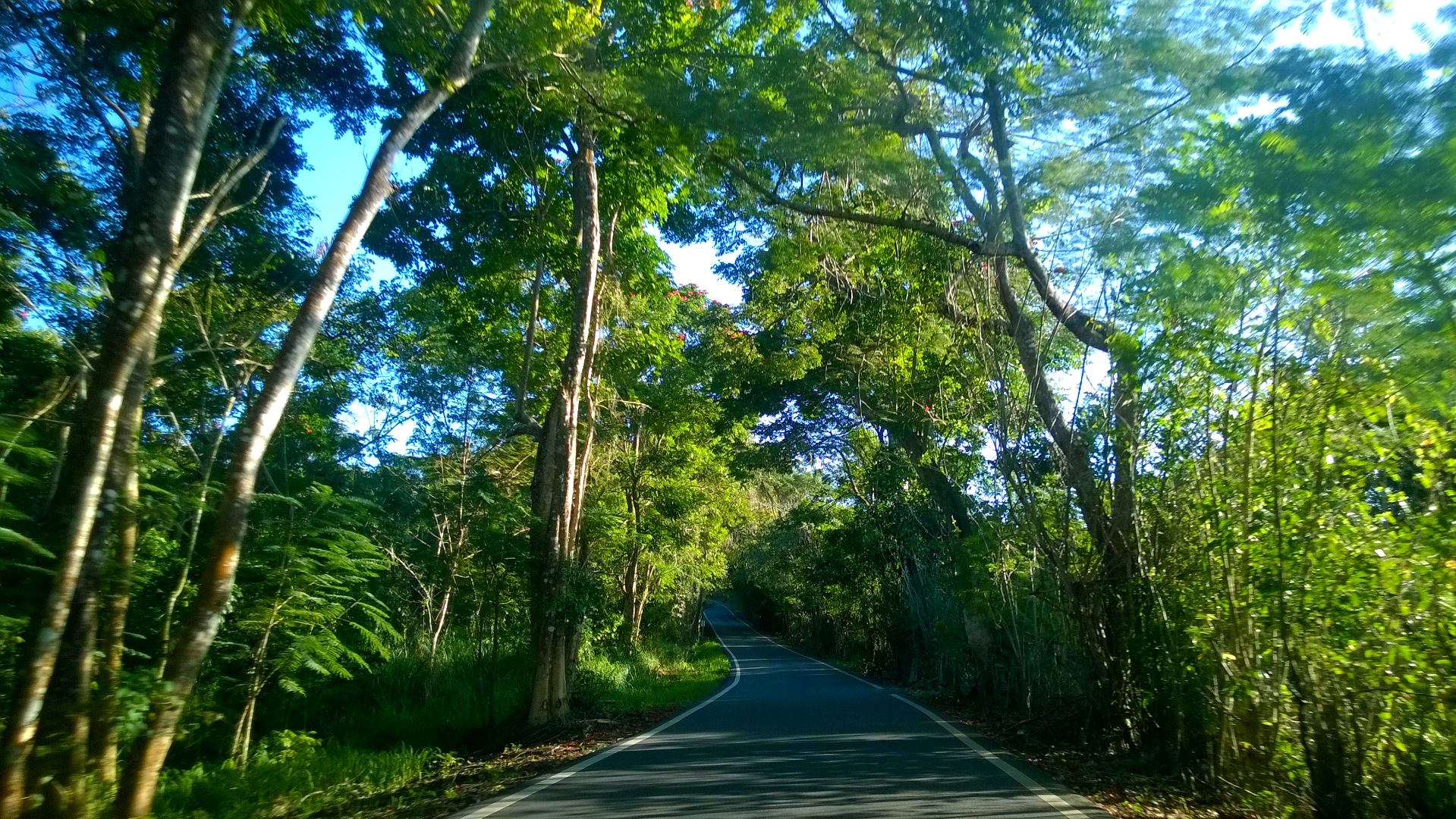
Heading east in Río Lajas, Toa Alta

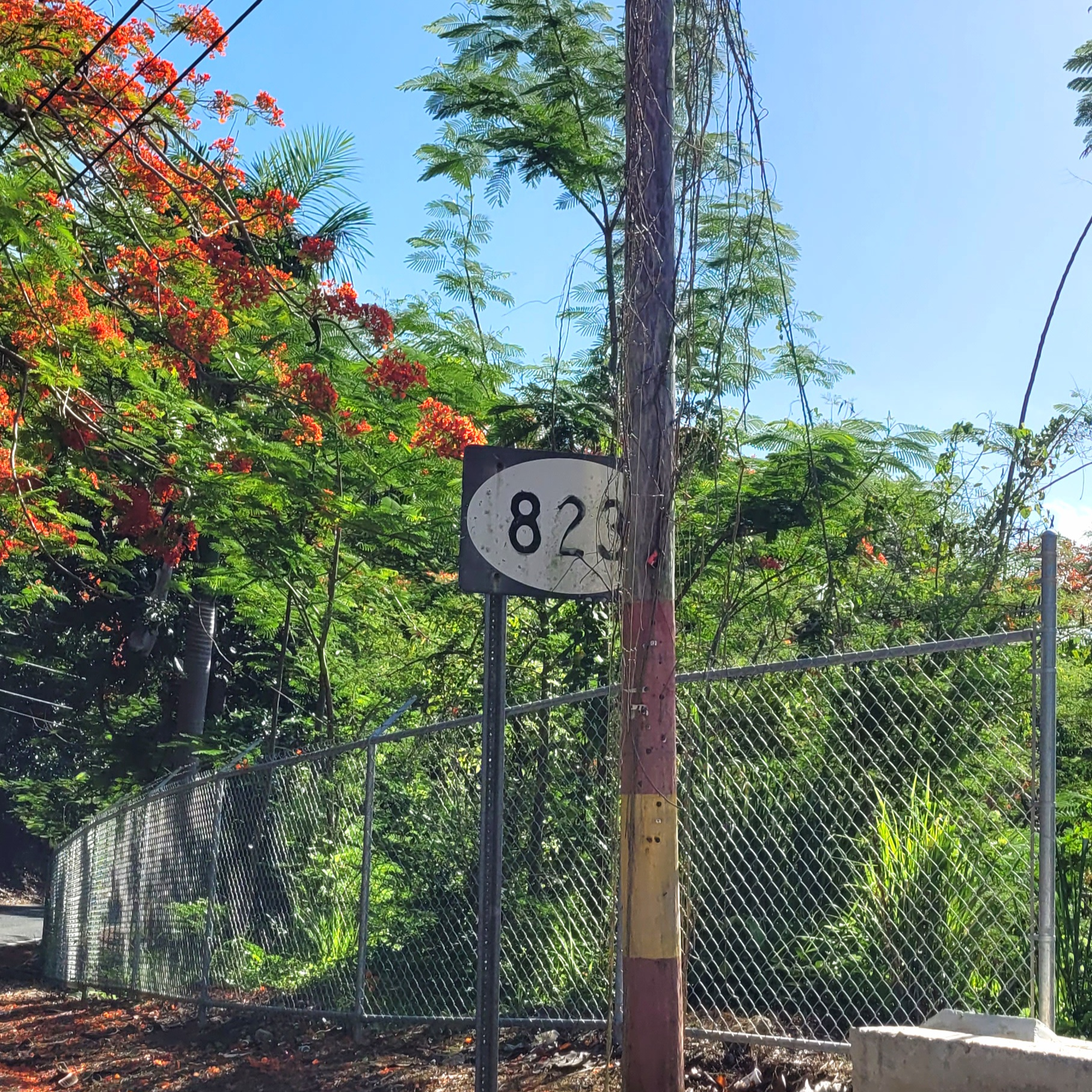
Eastbound sign in Quebrada Arenas, Toa Alta

== History ==
Prior to its numerical designation, PR-823 was known as Carretera del Güinche and Carretera de Quebrada Arenas. The current numerical designation corresponds to the 1953 Puerto Rico highway renumbering, a process implemented by the Puerto Rico Department of Transportation and Public Works (Spanish: Departamento de Transportación y Obras Públicas) that increased the insular highway network to connect existing routes with different locations around Puerto Rico.

== Major intersections ==
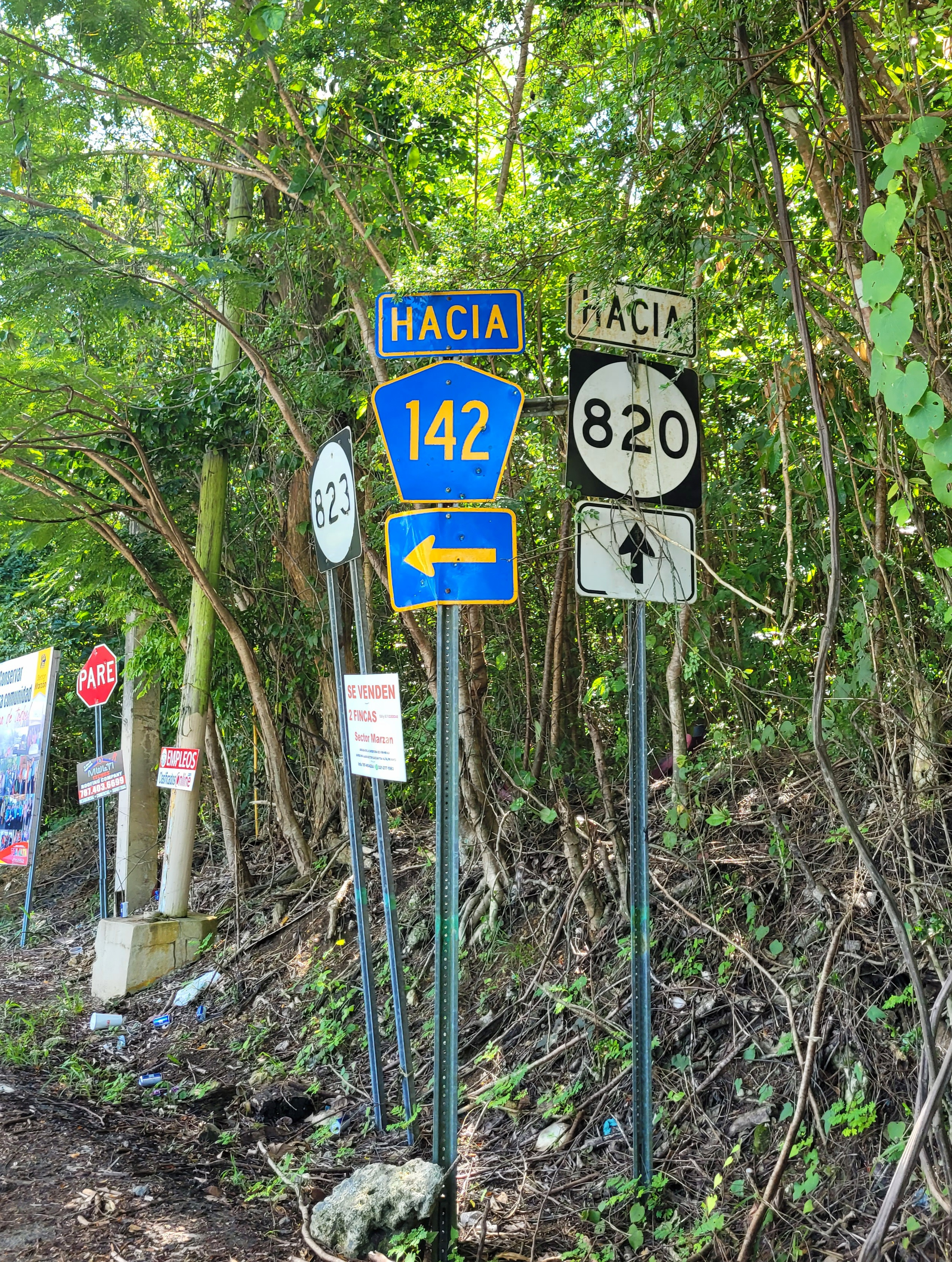
PR-823 east at PR-820 intersection in Río Lajas, Toa Alta

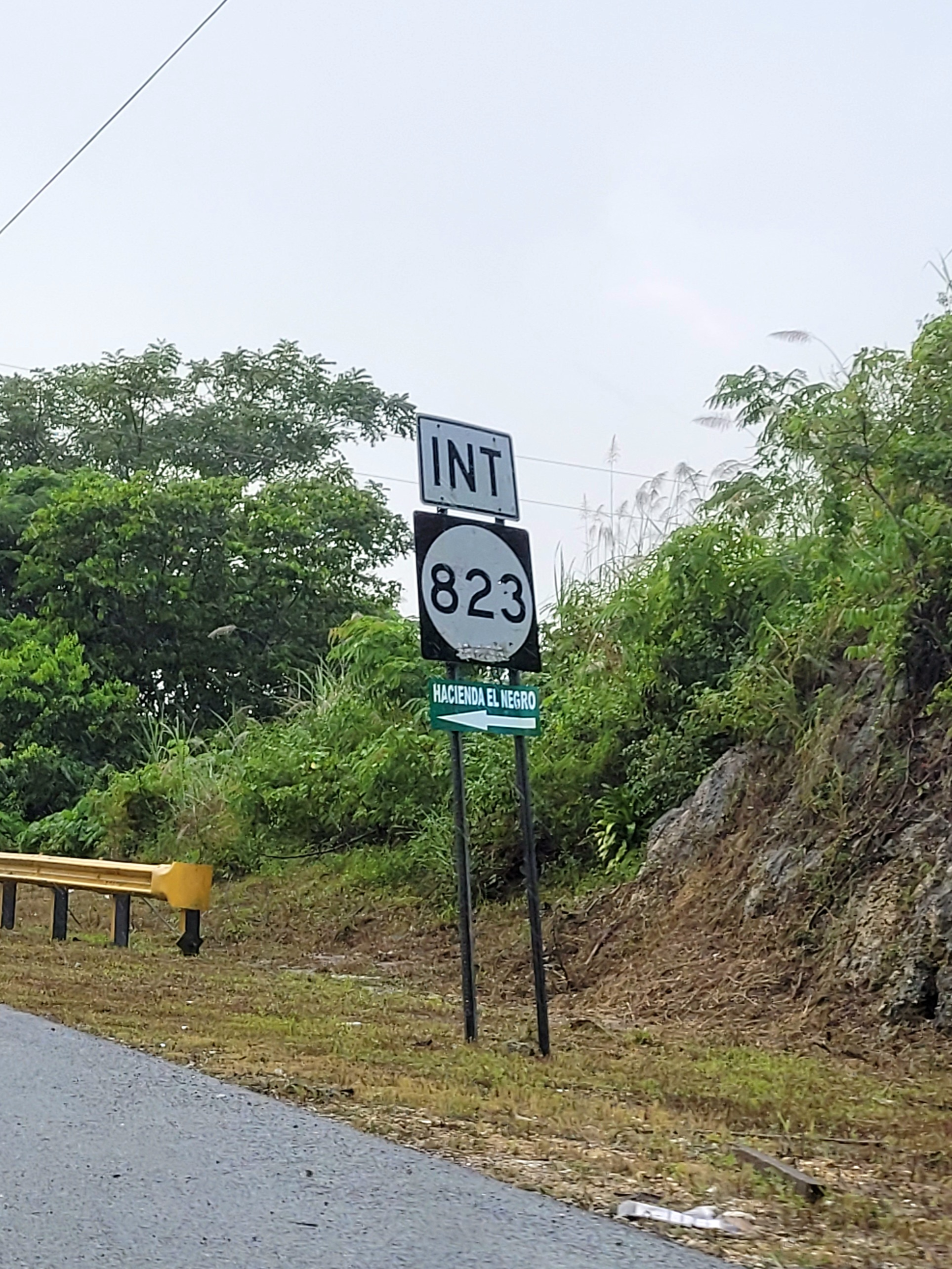
PR-142 south near the northern terminus of PR-823 concurrency in Río Lajas, Toa Alta

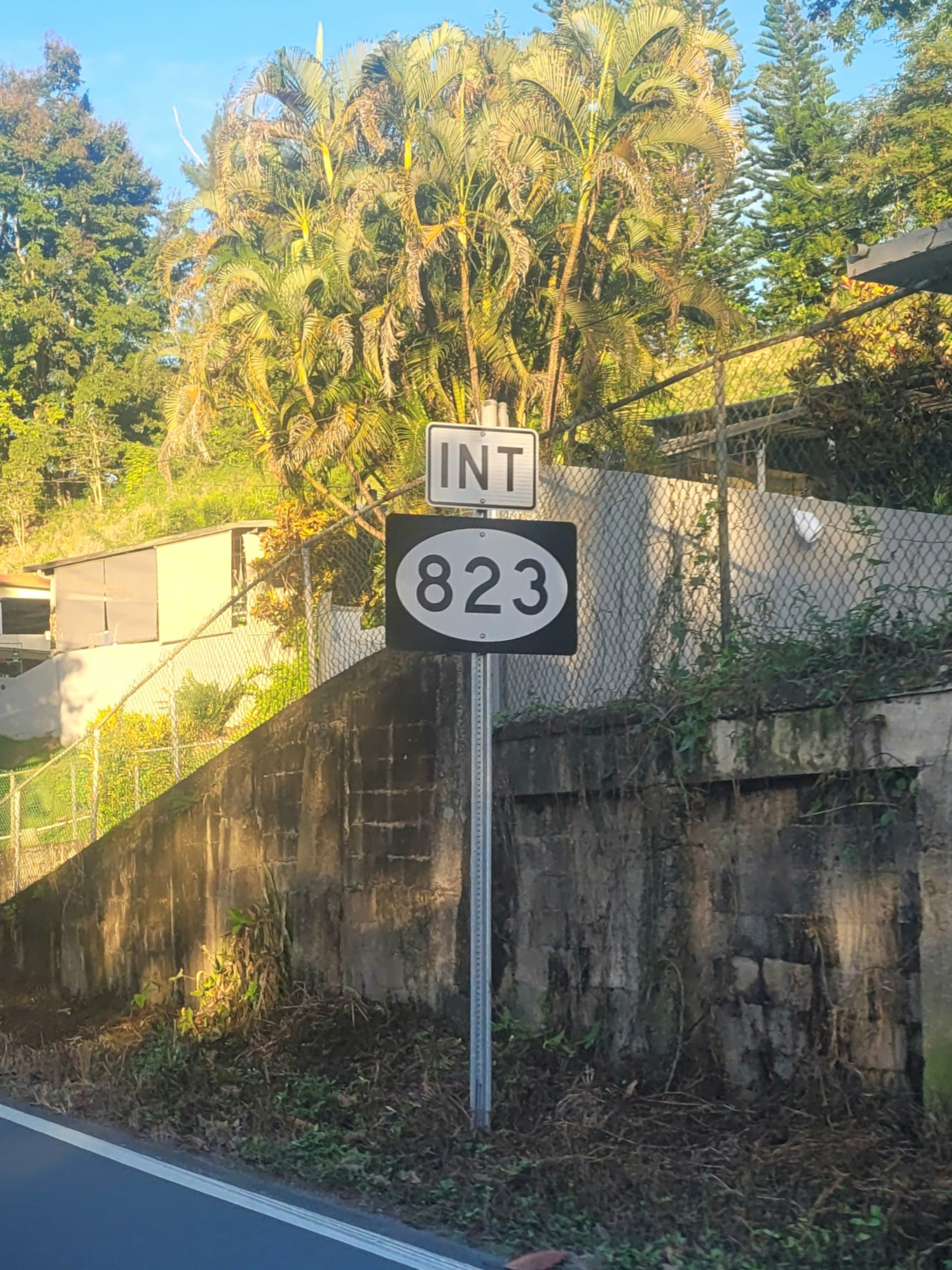
PR-806 north near PR-823 junction in Quebrada Arenas, Toa Alta

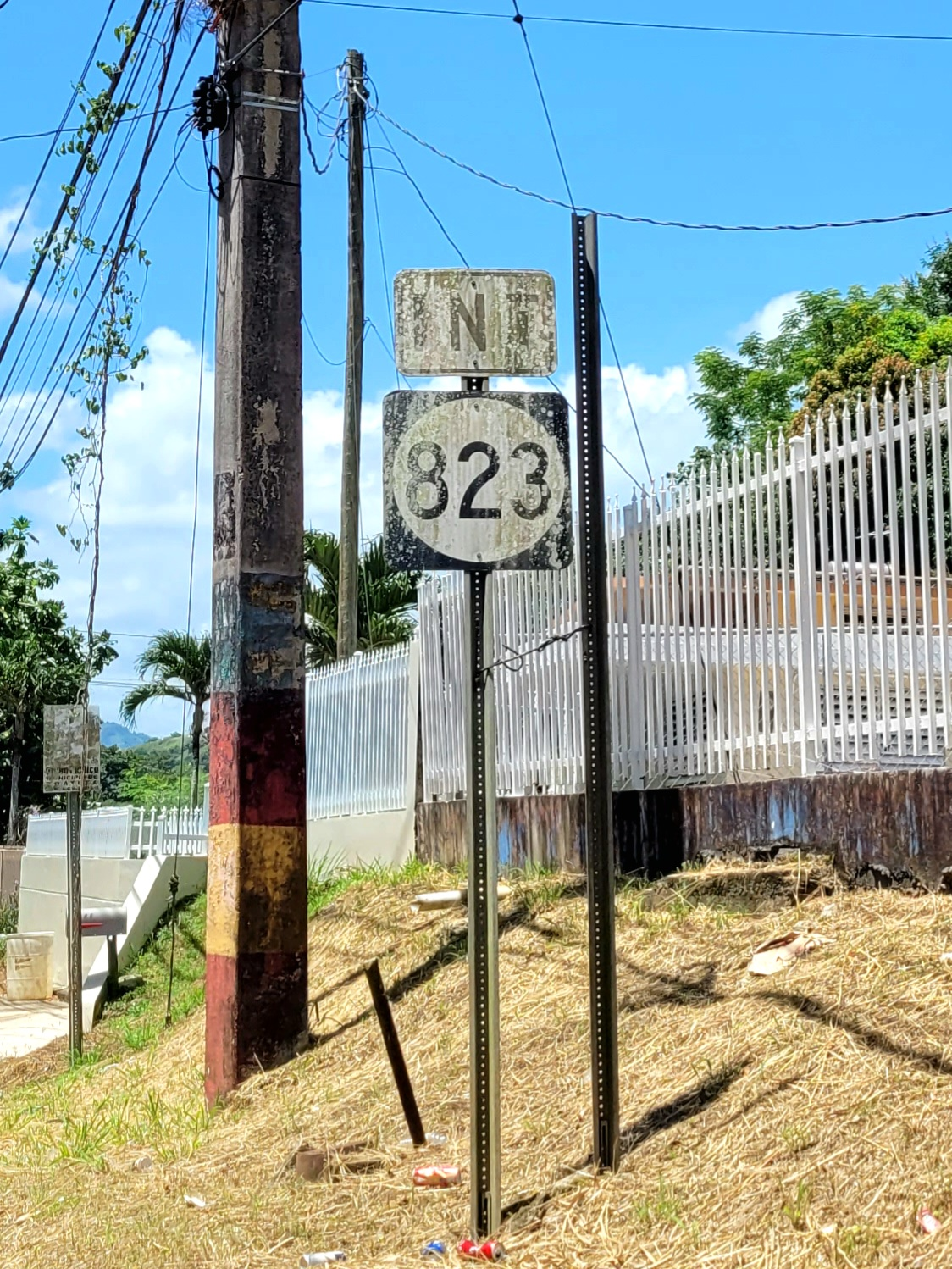
PR-165 south approaching the eastern terminus of PR-823 in Contorno, Toa Alta

| Municipality | Location | km | mi | Destinations | Notes |
|---|---|---|---|---|---|
| Dorado | Espinosa | 7.2 | 4.5 | PR-679 – Dorado, Vega Alta | Continuation beyond PR-677 |
| Dorado | Espinosa | 7.2 | 4.5 | PR-677 | Western terminus of PR-823 and southern terminus of PR-679 |
| Toa Alta | Río Lajas | 6.3 | 3.9 | PR-820 (Carretera Marzán) – Marzán | |
| Toa Alta | Río Lajas | 6.1 4.0 (Note: Kilometer markers represent the distance along PR-142 rather than PR-823.) | 3.8 2.5 | PR-142 north (Carretera José Antonio "Sonny" Rodríguez Ortiz) – Dorado | Northern terminus of PR-142 concurrency |
| Toa Alta | Río Lajas | 4.95 6.0 | 3.08 3.7 | PR-142 south (Carretera José Antonio "Sonny" Rodríguez Ortiz) – Corozal | Southern terminus of PR-142 concurrency |
| Toa Alta | Quebrada Arenas | 2.6 | 1.6 | PR-806 – Corozal | |
| Toa Alta | Galateo–Contorno line | 0.0 | 0.0 | PR-165 – Toa Alta, Naranjito | Eastern terminus of PR-823; access to Corozal |
1.000 mi = 1.609 km; 1.000 km = 0.621 mi: Concurrency terminus
