= Puerto Rico Highway 820 =

Highway in Puerto Rico

Highway 820
- Ruta 820
- Carretera Marzán

Route information
- Maintained by Puerto Rico DTPW
- Length: 2.1 km (1.3 mi)
- Existed: 1953–present

Major junctions
- West end: PR-677 / PR-678 in Maricao
- East end: PR-823 in Río Lajas

Location
- Country: United States
- Territory: Puerto Rico
- Municipalities: Vega Alta, Toa Alta

Highway system
- Roads in Puerto Rico; List
← PR-819	→ PR-821

Puerto Rico Highway 820 (PR-820) is an east–west road between the municipalities of Toa Alta and Vega Alta in Puerto Rico. With a length of 2.1 kilometers (1.3 mi), it extends from PR-823 in Río Lajas barrio to its intersection with PR-677 and PR-678 in Maricao barrio.

== Route description ==
Puerto Rico Highway 820 is a rural road with a single lane per direction along its entire length. In Toa Alta, PR-820 leaves from PR-823, passing through Marzán neighborhood until the Vega Alta municipal limit. In Vega Alta, PR-820 has a short length from the Toa Alta municipal limit until its western terminus at PR-677 and PR-678 intersection. The entire length in Toa Alta is located in Río Lajas barrio, while in Vega Alta it is located entirely in Maricao barrio.

Puerto Rico Highway 820

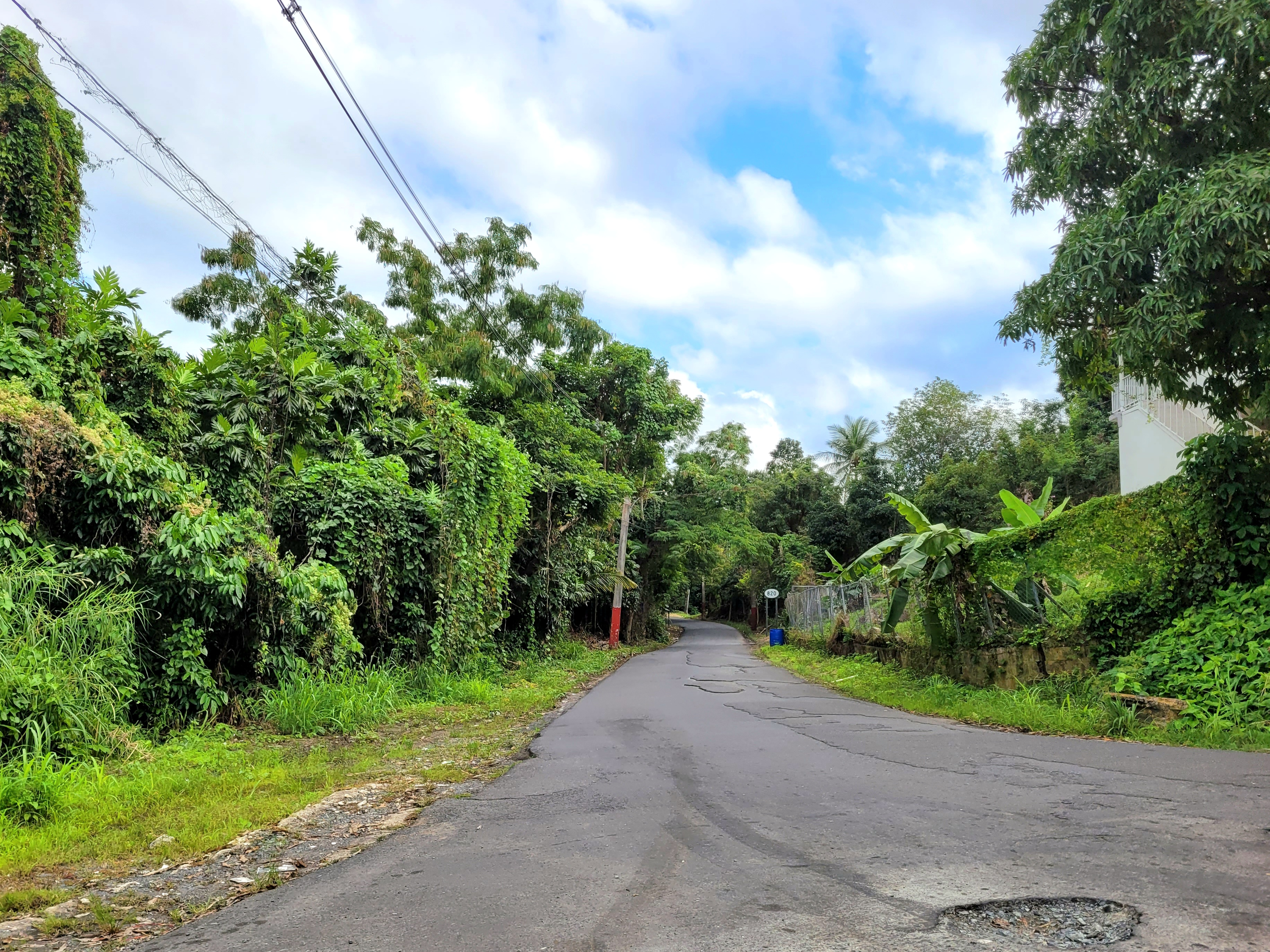
Western terminus at PR-677 and PR-678 intersection in Maricao, Vega Alta, looking east

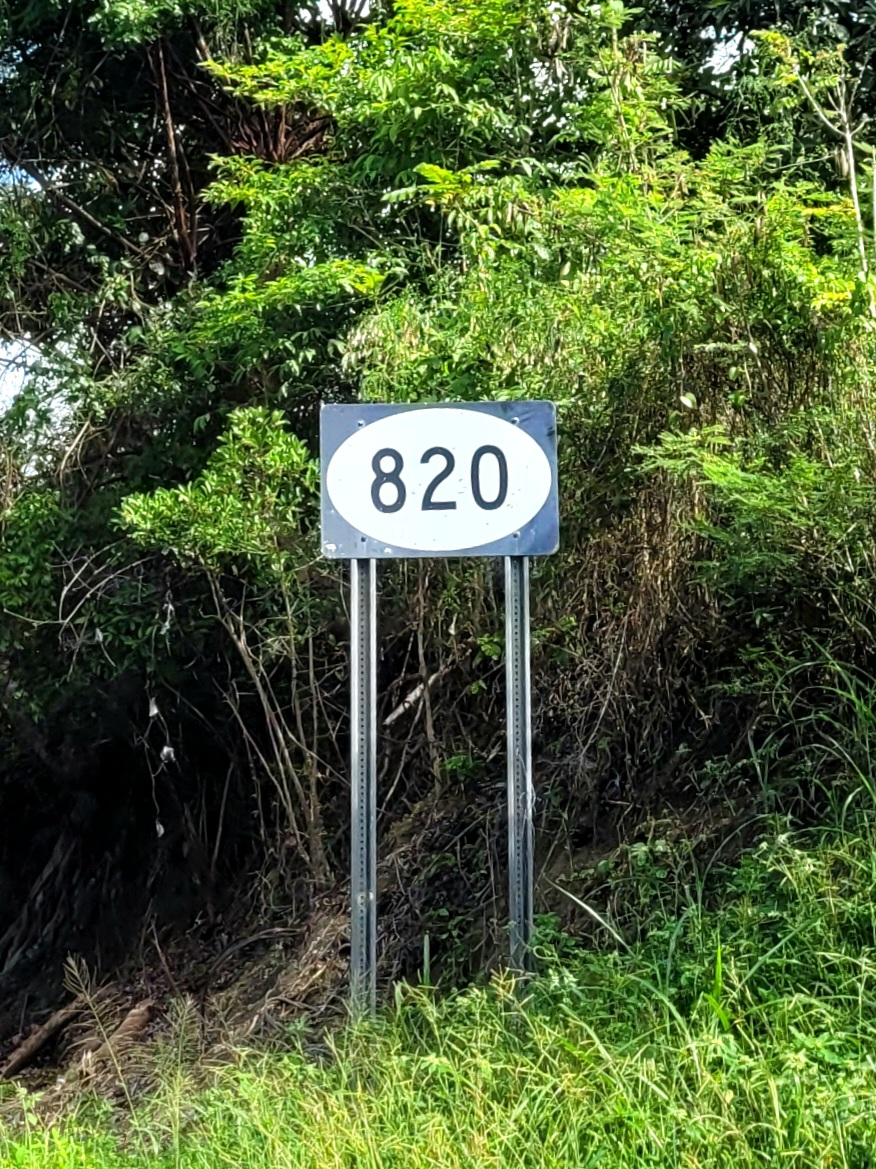
Eastbound sign in Maricao, Vega Alta

== Major intersections ==
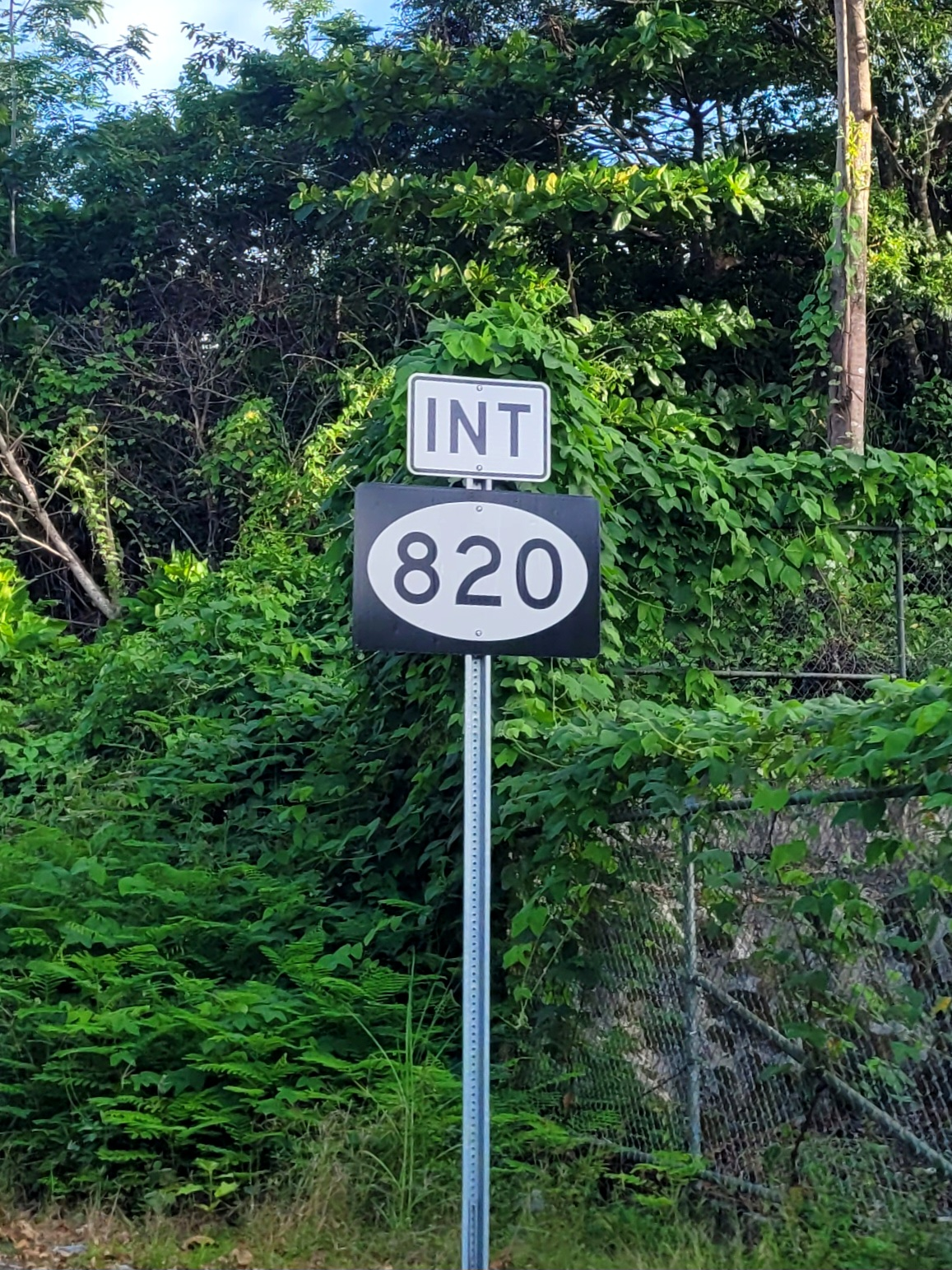
PR-823 east approaching PR-820 in Río Lajas, Toa Alta

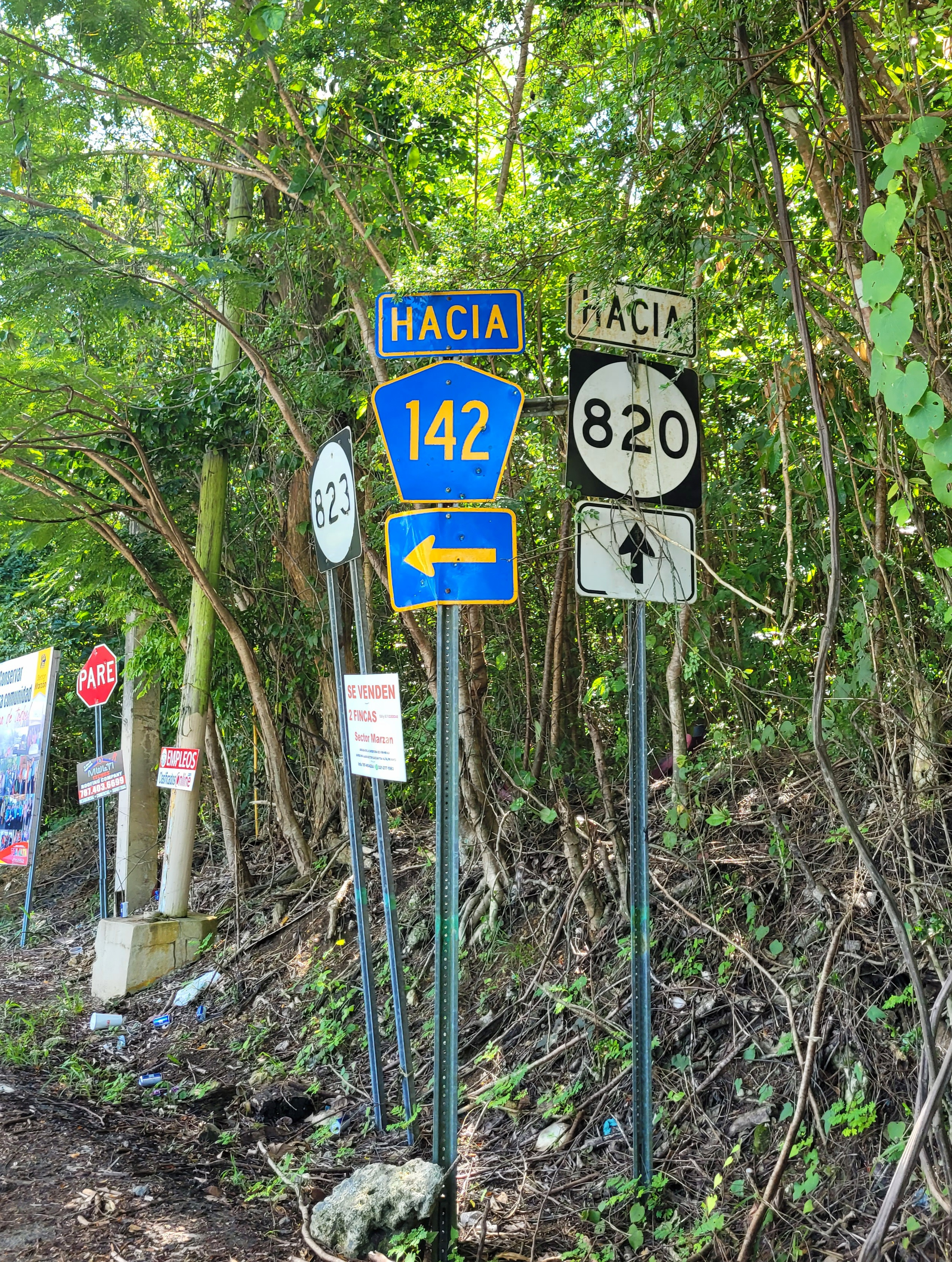
PR-823 east at PR-820 intersection in Río Lajas, Toa Alta

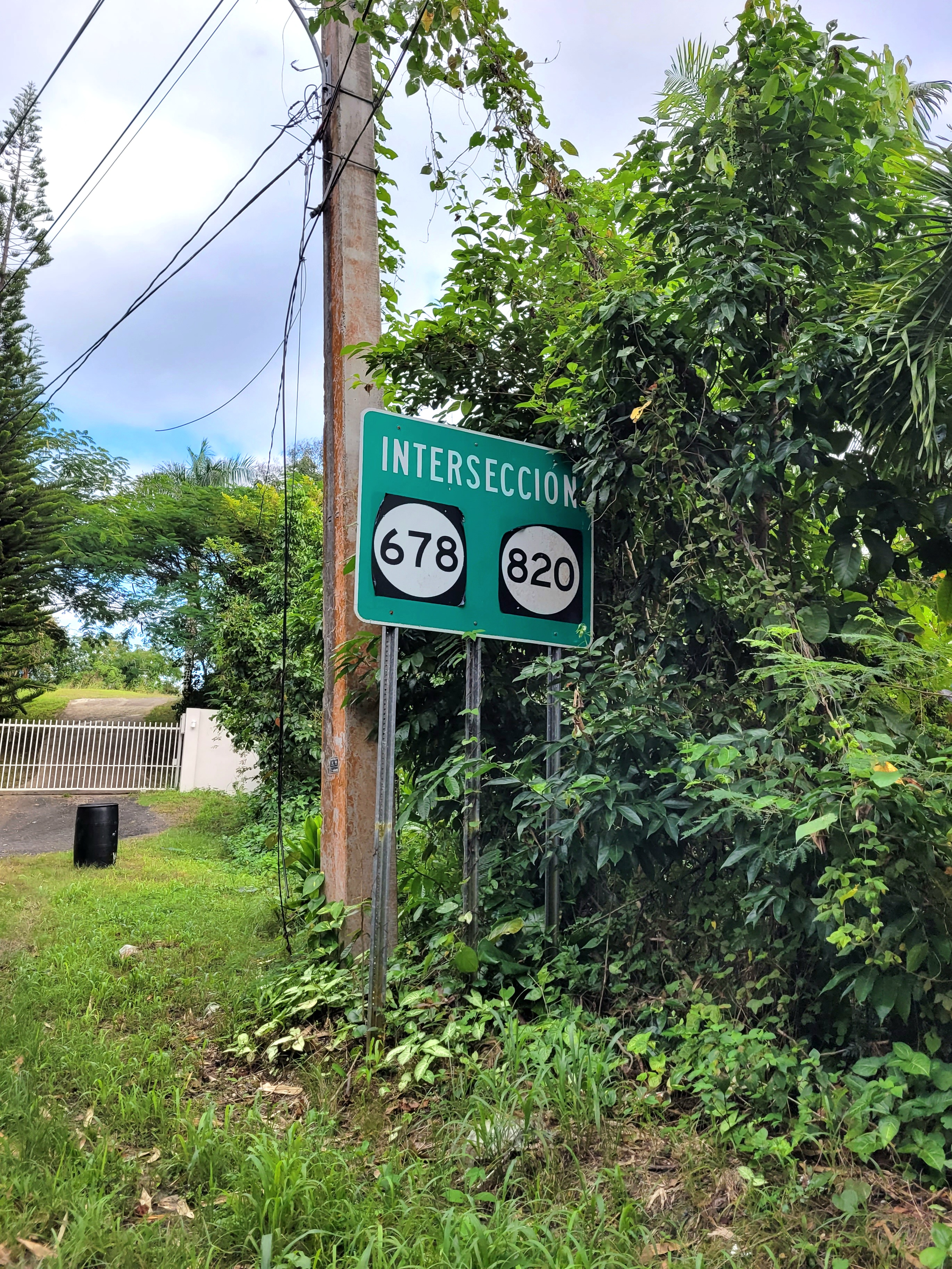
PR-677 east near PR-678 and PR-820 intersection in Maricao, Vega Alta

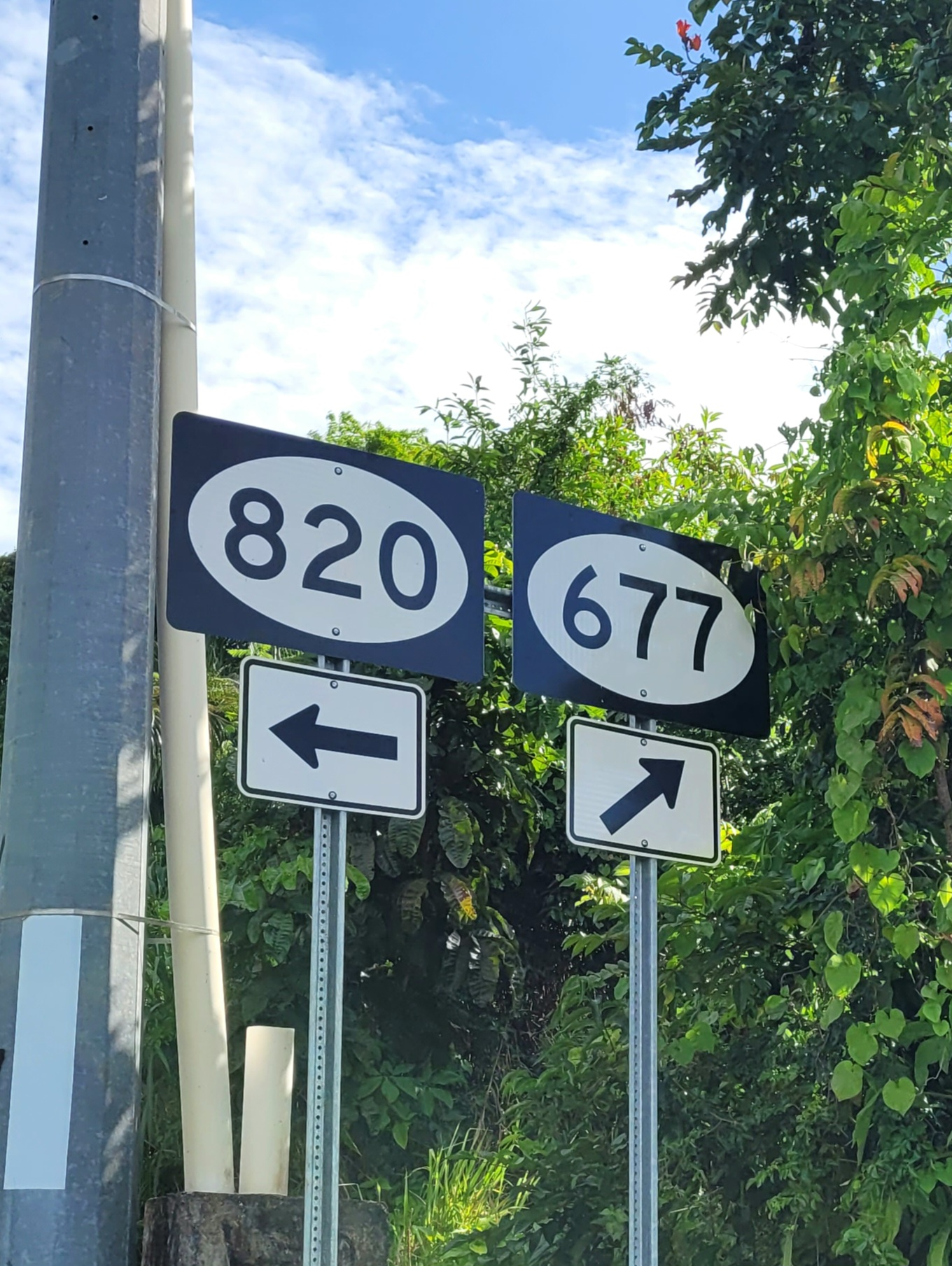
PR-678 south at PR-677 and PR-820 intersection in Maricao, Vega Alta

Municipality	Location	km	mi	Destinations	Notes
Vega Alta	Maricao	2.1	1.3	PR-677 / PR-678 (Carretera Pámpanos) – Vega Alta, Maricao	Western terminus of PR-820
Toa Alta	Río Lajas	0.0	0.0	PR-823 to PR-142 (Carretera José Antonio "Sonny" Rodríguez Ortiz) – Toa Alta, Dorado, Corozal	Eastern terminus of PR-820
1.000 mi = 1.609 km; 1.000 km = 0.621 mi

== See also ==
- 1953 Puerto Rico highway renumbering
