= Puerto Rico Highway 679 =

Highway in Puerto Rico

Highway 679
- Ruta 679
- Carretera Doctor Hernán Ortiz Camacho

Route information
- Maintained by Puerto Rico DTPW
- Length: 2.7 km (1.7 mi)
- Existed: 1953–present

Major junctions
- South end: PR-677 / PR-823 in Espinosa
- North end: PR-2 in Maguayo

Location
- Country: United States
- Territory: Puerto Rico
- Municipalities: Dorado, Vega Alta

Highway system
- Roads in Puerto Rico; List
← PR-647	→ PR-690

Puerto Rico Highway 679 (PR-679) is a north–south road located between the municipalities of Dorado and Vega Alta in Puerto Rico. With a length of 2.7 kilometers (1.7 mi), it begins at its intersection with PR-677 and PR-823 in Espinosa barrio, and ends at its junction with PR-2 in Maguayo barrio.

== Route description ==
Puerto Rico Highway 679 is a rural road with a single lane per direction along its entire length. It has two segments in Dorado and another one in Vega Alta. The first segment in Dorado is located in southwestern Espinosa barrio, extending from its southern terminus at PR-677 and PR-823 intersection to the Vega Alta municipal limit. In Vega Alta, PR-679 passes briefly through southeastern Espinosa barrio. Then, PR-679 return to Dorado with its second segment through western Espinosa and southwestern Maguayo until its northern terminus at PR-2 junction.

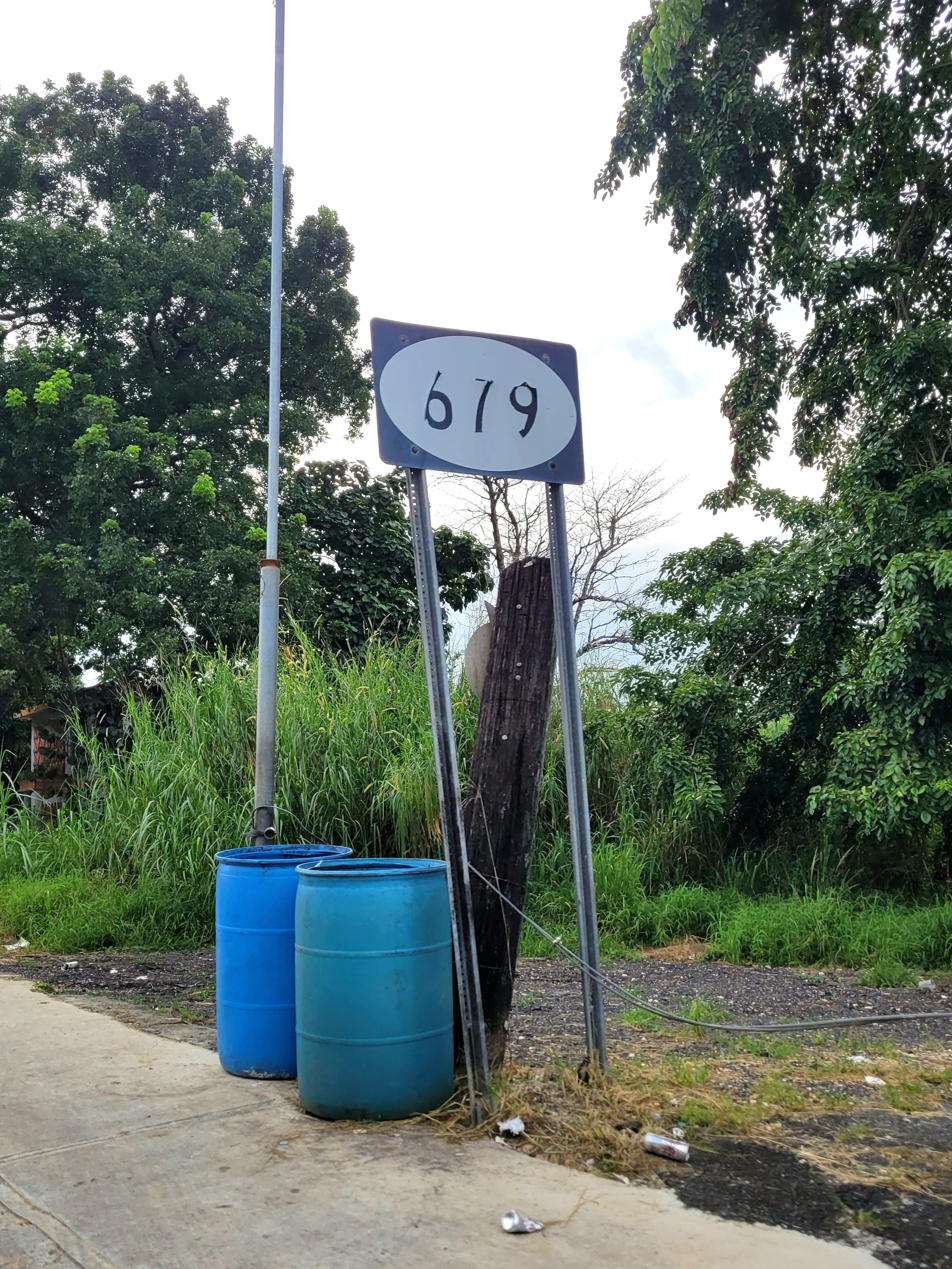
Sign for PR-679 in Espinosa, Dorado, looking south

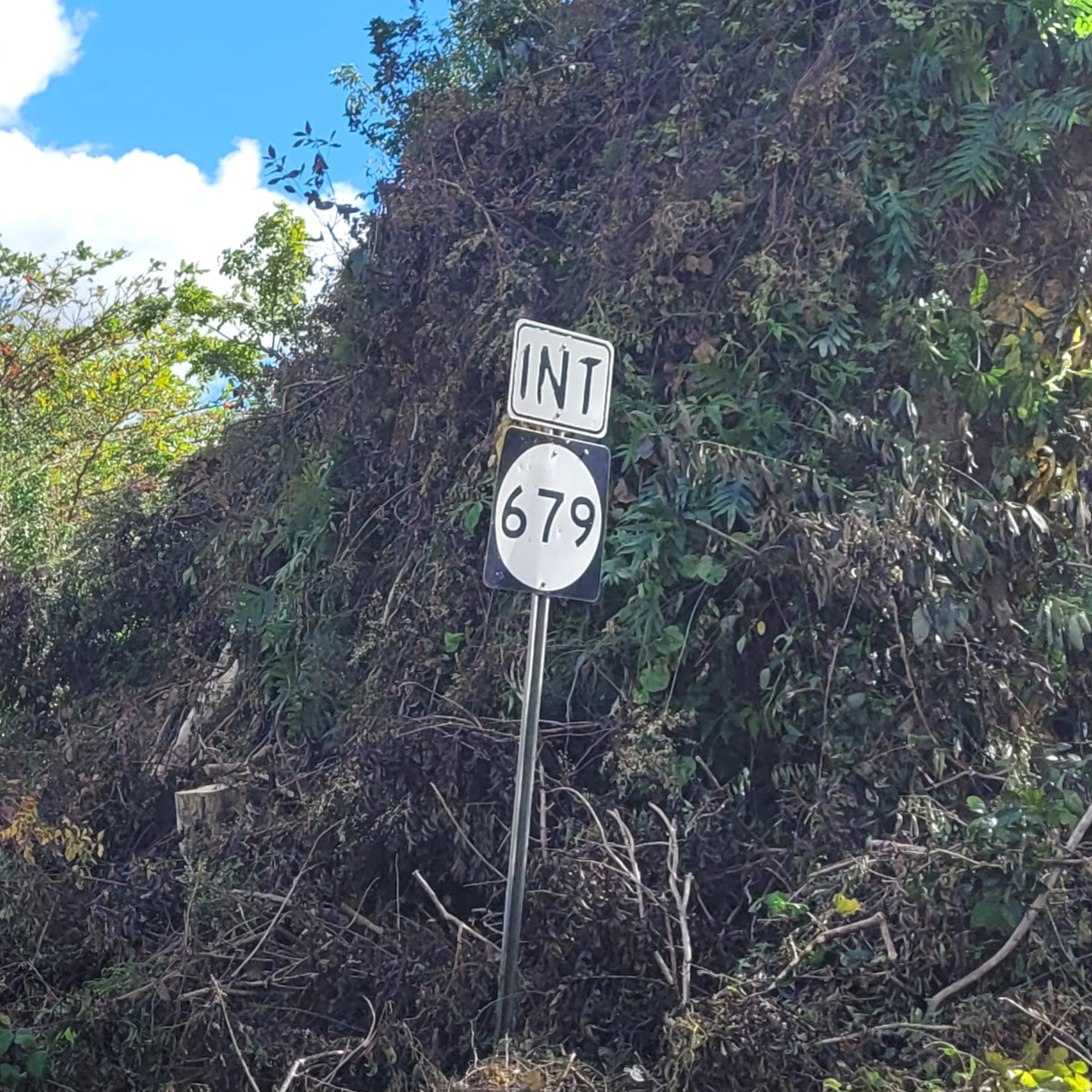
PR-2 east near PR-679 intersection in Espinosa, Dorado

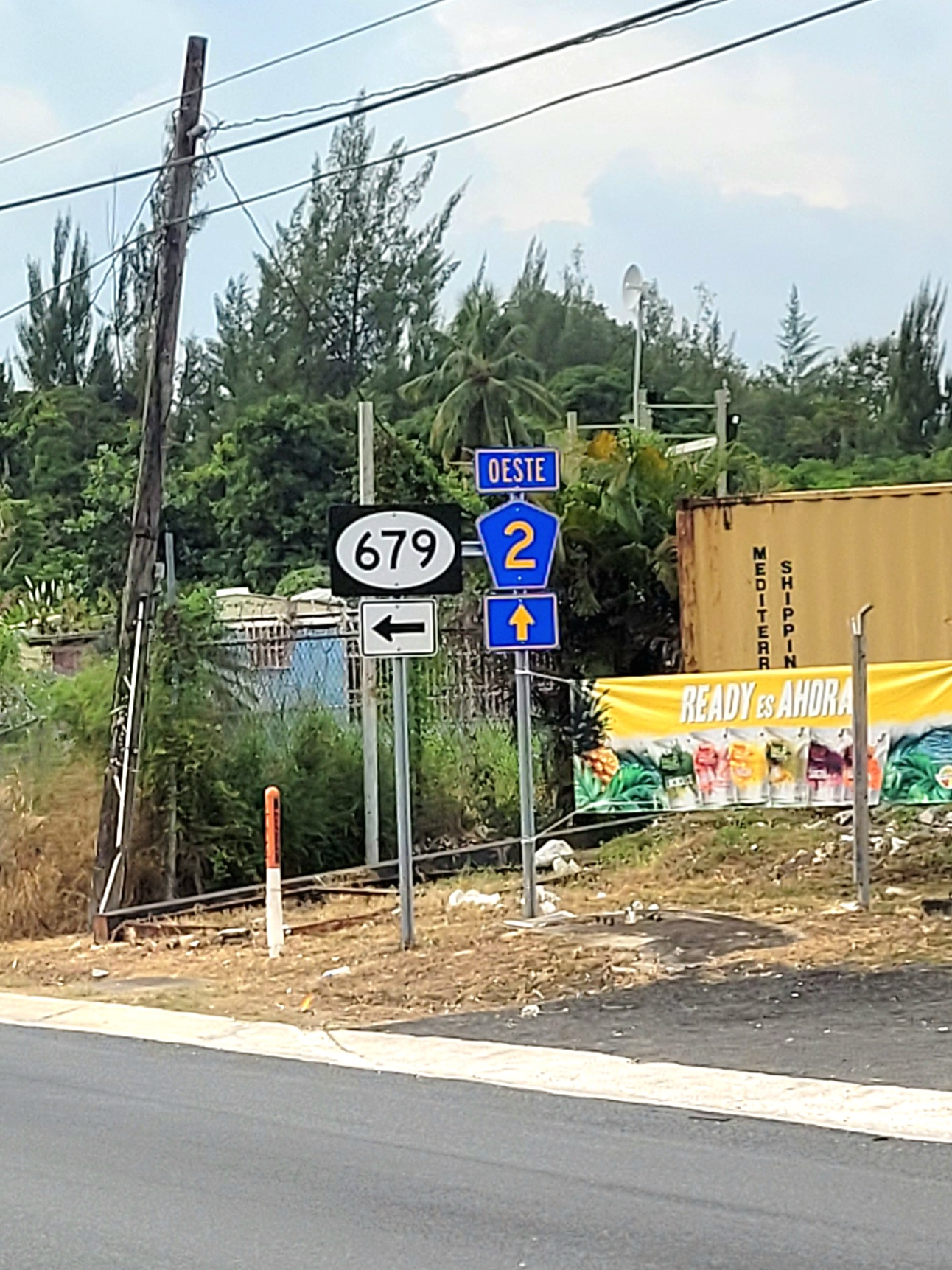
PR-2 west at PR-679 intersection in Espinosa, Dorado

== History ==
Prior to its numerical designation, PR-679 was known as Carretera de Quebrada Arenas, a road that ran from PR-2 to Toa Alta through PR-679 and PR-823. The current numerical designation corresponds to the 1953 Puerto Rico highway renumbering, a process implemented by the Puerto Rico Department of Transportation and Public Works (Spanish: Departamento de Transportación y Obras Públicas) that increased the insular highway network to connect existing routes with different locations around Puerto Rico.

== Major intersections ==
Municipality	Location	km	mi	Destinations	Notes
Dorado	Espinosa	0.0	0.0	PR-823	Continuation beyond PR-677; access to PR-142 and Toa Alta
Dorado	Espinosa	0.0	0.0	PR-677	Southern terminus of PR-679 and western terminus of PR-823; access to PR-142
Vega Alta	No major junctions				
Dorado	Maguayo	2.7	1.7	PR-2 – Vega Alta, Arecibo, Bayamón, San Juan	Northern terminus of PR-679
1.000 mi = 1.609 km; 1.000 km = 0.621 mi
