= Puerto Rico Highway 142 =

Highway in Puerto Rico

Highway 142
- Ruta 142
- Carretera José Antonio "Sonny" Rodríguez Ortiz
- PR-142 highlighted in red

Route information
- Maintained by Puerto Rico DTPW
- Length: 8.2 km (5.1 mi)

Major junctions
- South end: PR-159 in Pueblo
- PR-823 in Río Lajas; PR-677 in Espinosa
- North end: PR-2 in Espinosa–Maguayo

Location
- Country: United States
- Territory: Puerto Rico
- Municipalities: Corozal, Toa Alta, Dorado

Highway system
- Roads in Puerto Rico; List
← PR-141	→ PR-143

Puerto Rico Highway 142 (PR-142) is a north–south road that connects the northern region of Puerto Rico with the municipality of Corozal. With a length of about 8.2 kilometers (5.1 mi), PR-142 crosses the municipalities of Dorado, Toa Alta and Corozal, extending from PR-2 in Dorado to PR-159 near downtown Corozal.

== Route description ==
Puerto Rico Highway 142 begins in Dorado as a divided highway with two lanes in both directions. Then it becomes a smaller road known as 2+1 road, with areas where there are two lanes in one direction and one lane in the other direction until its end in Corozal. At all of its junctions with other roads is a divided highway and has a speed limit of 45 miles per hour (72 km/h) in the entire length. Between Toa Alta and Corozal, the road can be dangerous during the night and rainy days because the area is very dark and the fog formation is frequent, causing poor visibility to drivers. In 2009, this highway was officially designated as Carretera José Antonio "Sonny" Rodríguez Ortiz, although it is also commonly known as Expreso de Corozal (Corozal Expressway).

Puerto Rico Highway 142 by municipality

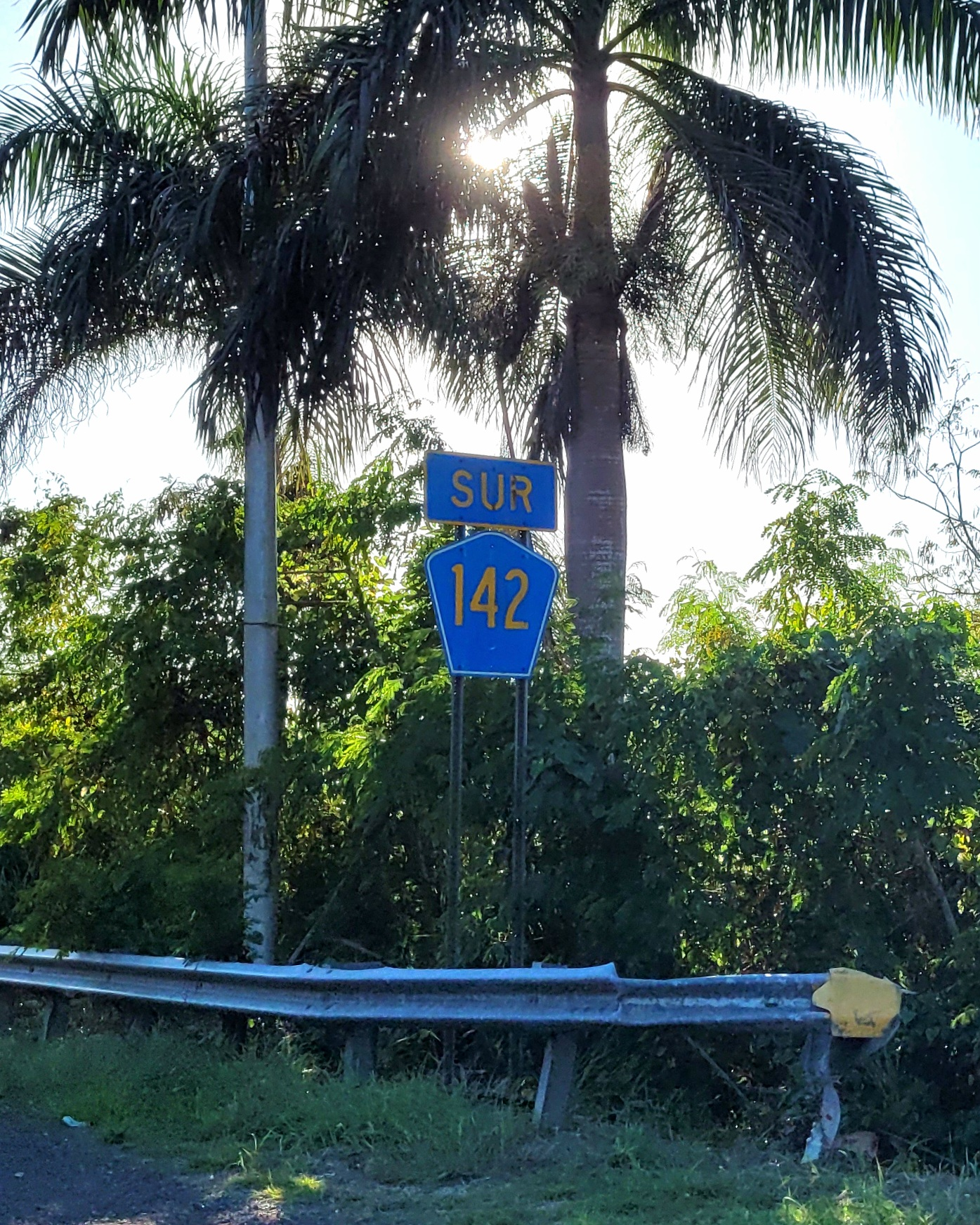
Southbound sign in Espinosa, Dorado

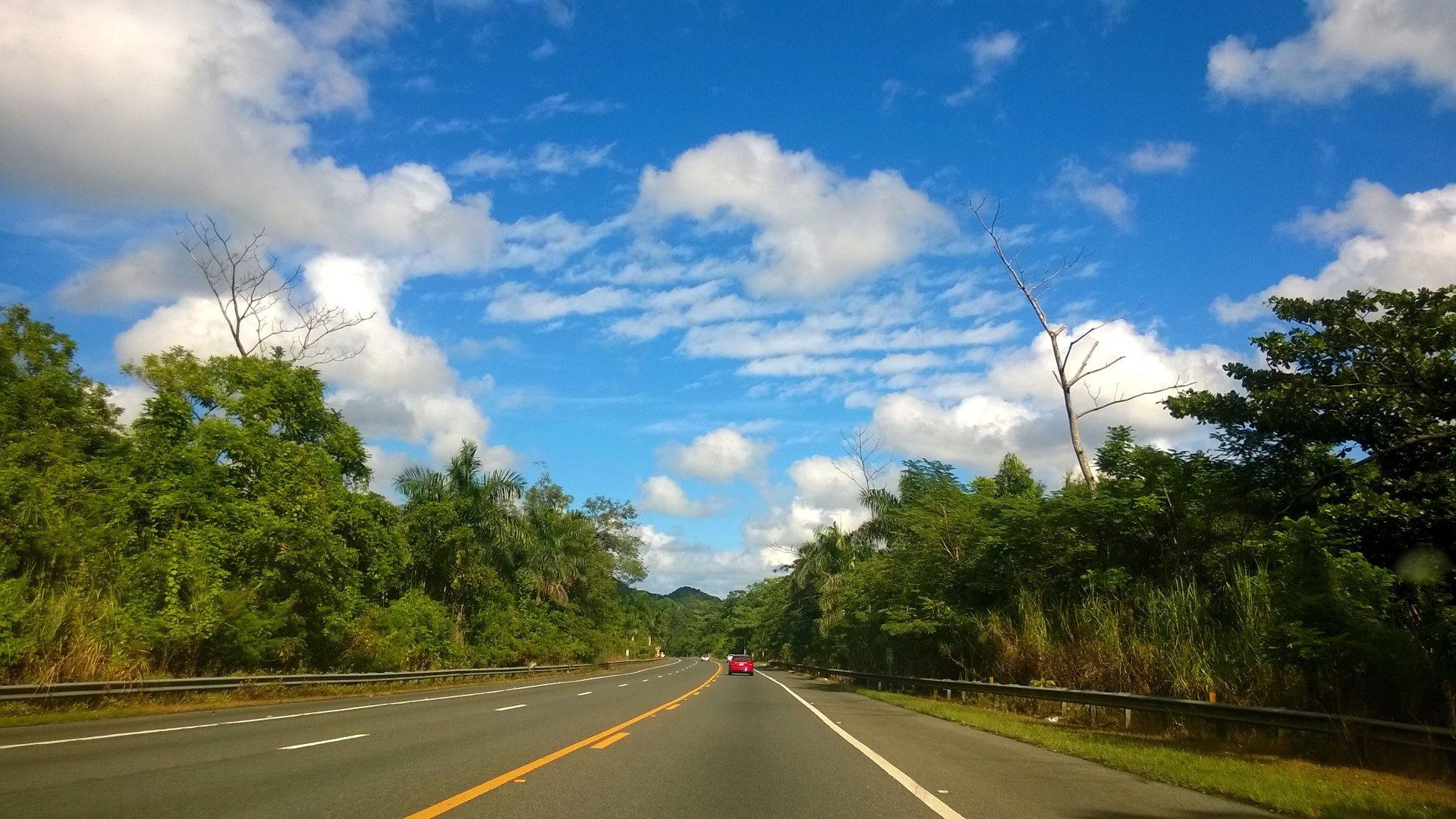
Heading north in Río Lajas, Toa Alta

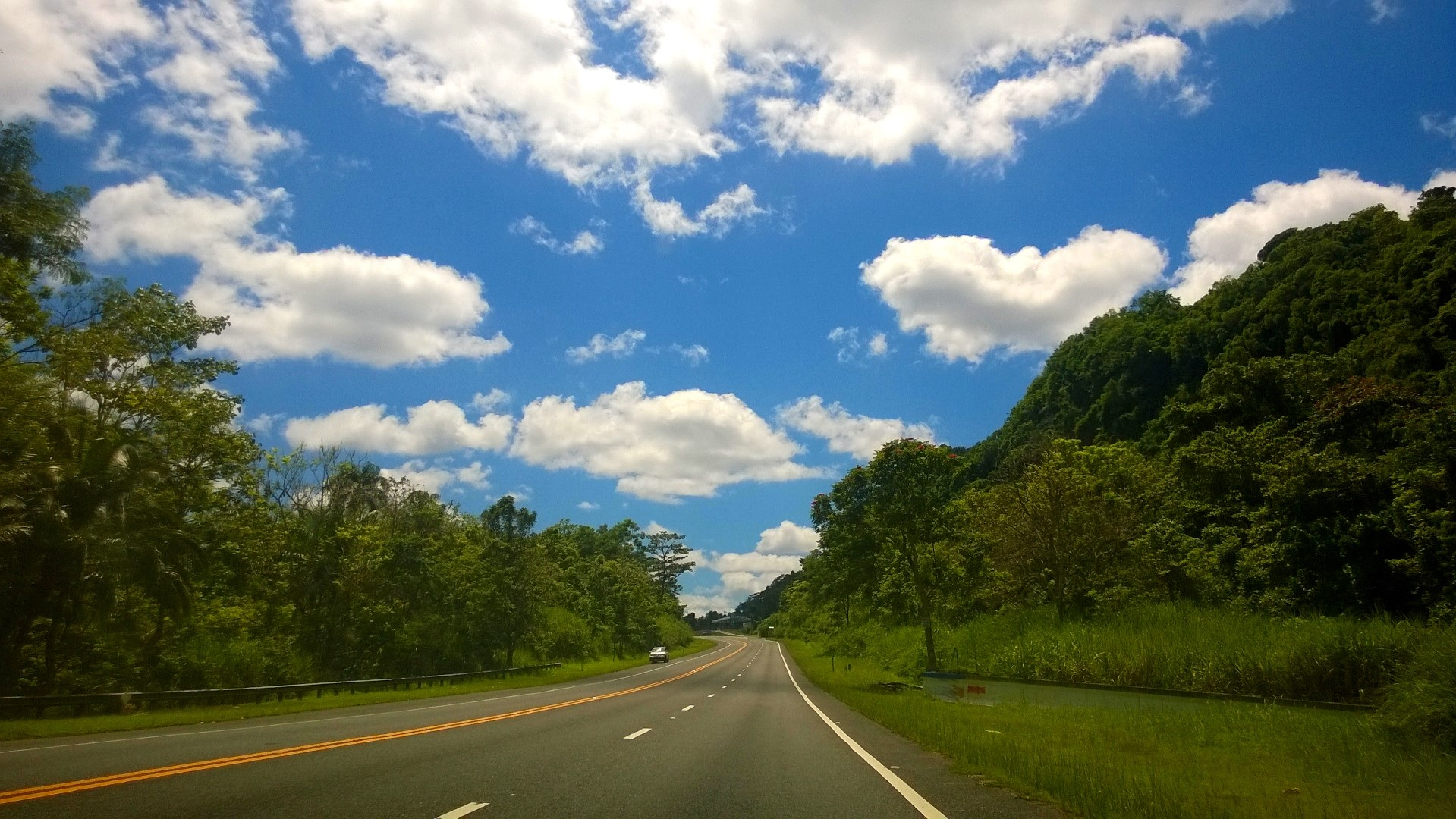
Heading south in Abras, Corozal

=== Dorado ===
In Dorado, it is mostly a divided highway with two lanes per direction. At this municipality, PR-142 has a trumpet interchange with PR-2 at its beginning between Maguayo and Espinosa barrios. Then, it has two intersections with PR-677 that serves to a few communities in Espinosa barrio. Before entering Toa Alta, PR-142 becomes an undivided highway with one lane per direction. The entire length of this highway in Dorado is located in Espinosa barrio.

=== Toa Alta ===
In Toa Alta, PR-142 is mostly a 2+1 road after crossing the Lajas River Bridge that is located on the municipal limit with Dorado. In this municipality, the highway has two intersections with PR-823 that serves to several communities located in Río Lajas barrio. PR-823 is concurrent with PR-142 for about one kilometer (0.62 mi) and in most of this concurrency there are two lanes per direction. Shortly after the overlap ends, Corozal begins. The entire length of PR-142 in Toa Alta is located in Río Lajas barrio.

=== Corozal ===
In Corozal, this highway is also mostly a 2+1 road from the Toa Alta municipal limit until its approach to PR-159, where it has two lanes in both directions. Only on the Mavilla River Bridge has a single lane per direction. Around the area where the river is located, the road is often covered by fog that forms at night and on rainy days, causing poor visibility and increasing the risk of traffic accidents. The route passes through Abras and Pueblo barrios until its end at PR-159 near downtown Corozal.

=== Locations served ===
The following are the municipalities, barrios and landmarks through which PR-142 passes from north to south:

Municipality	Barrios	Landmarks
Dorado	Maguayo, Espinosa	Parque Recreativo Teresa Ortiz, Lajas River
Toa Alta	Río Lajas	Lajas River
Corozal	Abras, Pueblo	Mavilla River

== History ==
In 1990, the possibility of building a highway that would connect the town of Corozal with the San Juan metropolitan area was studied due to the population growth that the municipality experienced during those years and the limited employment opportunity available in the mountainous region of Puerto Rico. Consequently, construction of the highway began in 1996 as part of government efforts so that residents of Corozal and bordering towns in the interior of Puerto Rico would have direct access to the Autopista José de Diego (PR-22) and see reduced travel time to their workplaces in the metropolitan area. The construction process was not without problems as the road was planned to be located in protected agricultural land and the Northern Karst zone, so the initial budget had to be increased so that the route was diverted through a more favorable area and thus avoiding the expropriation of a greater amount of land and families. The highway was inaugurated and completed around the year 2000.

== Future ==
In the short term, it is expected that the undivided road between Corozal and Dorado will be widened as a government initiative to reduce traffic accidents that have occurred on the highway. This project is currently being studied for the placement of a Jersey barrier between both directions, including more lanes and the installation of lights in dark areas with the collaboration of the municipality of Corozal. In the long term, PR-142 could be extended to PR-22, but no agreement has yet been reached for this project to become a reality. If the proposed project is completed, the highway could facilitate people's access to their workplaces in the metropolitan area while potentially reducing travel time between both regions.

== Major intersections ==
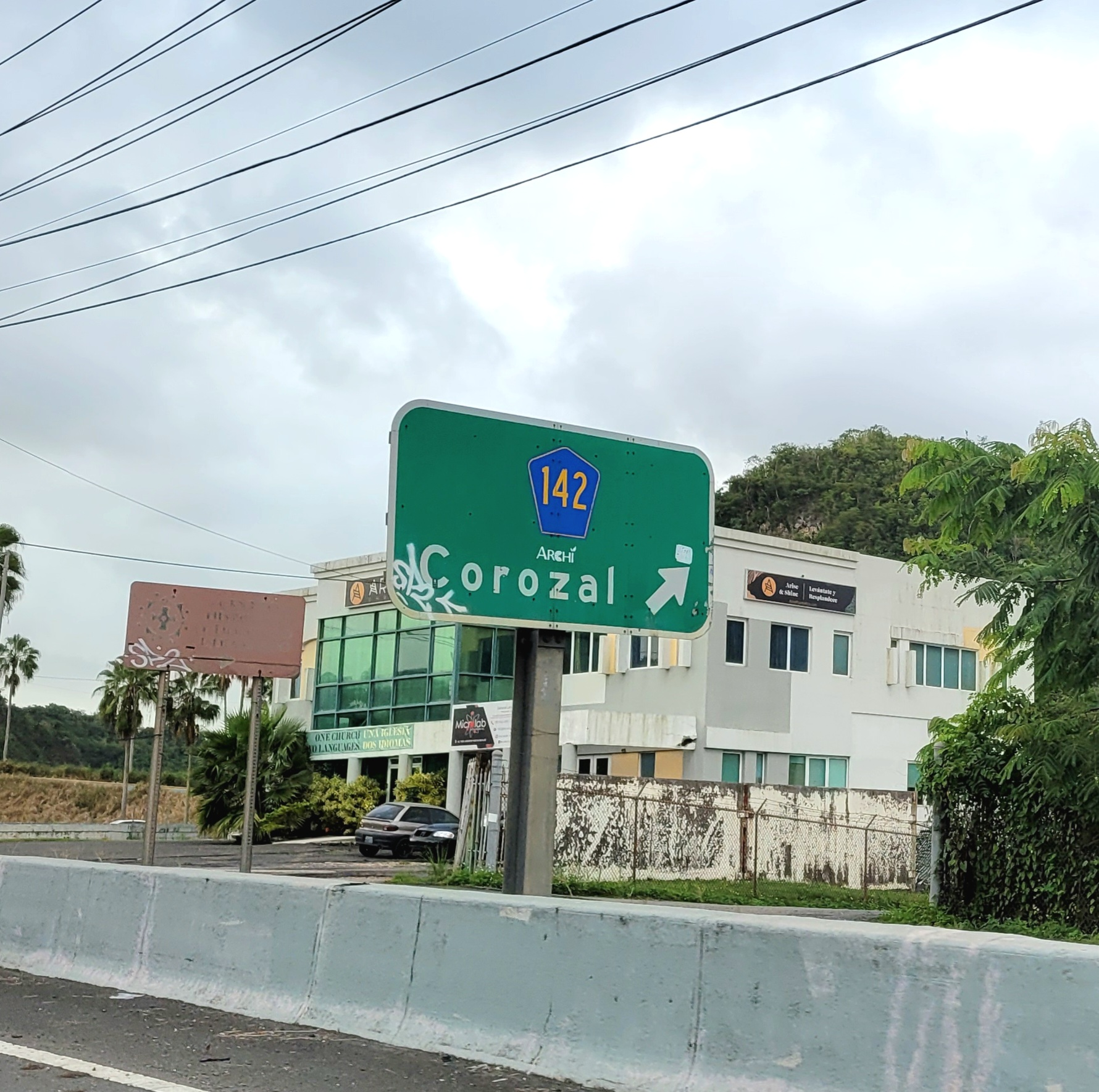
PR-2 west at the exit to PR-142 south in Maguayo, (Note: PR-2 is located on the Maguayo–Espinosa line. Eastbound lanes are located in Espinosa and westbound lanes are in Maguayo.) Dorado

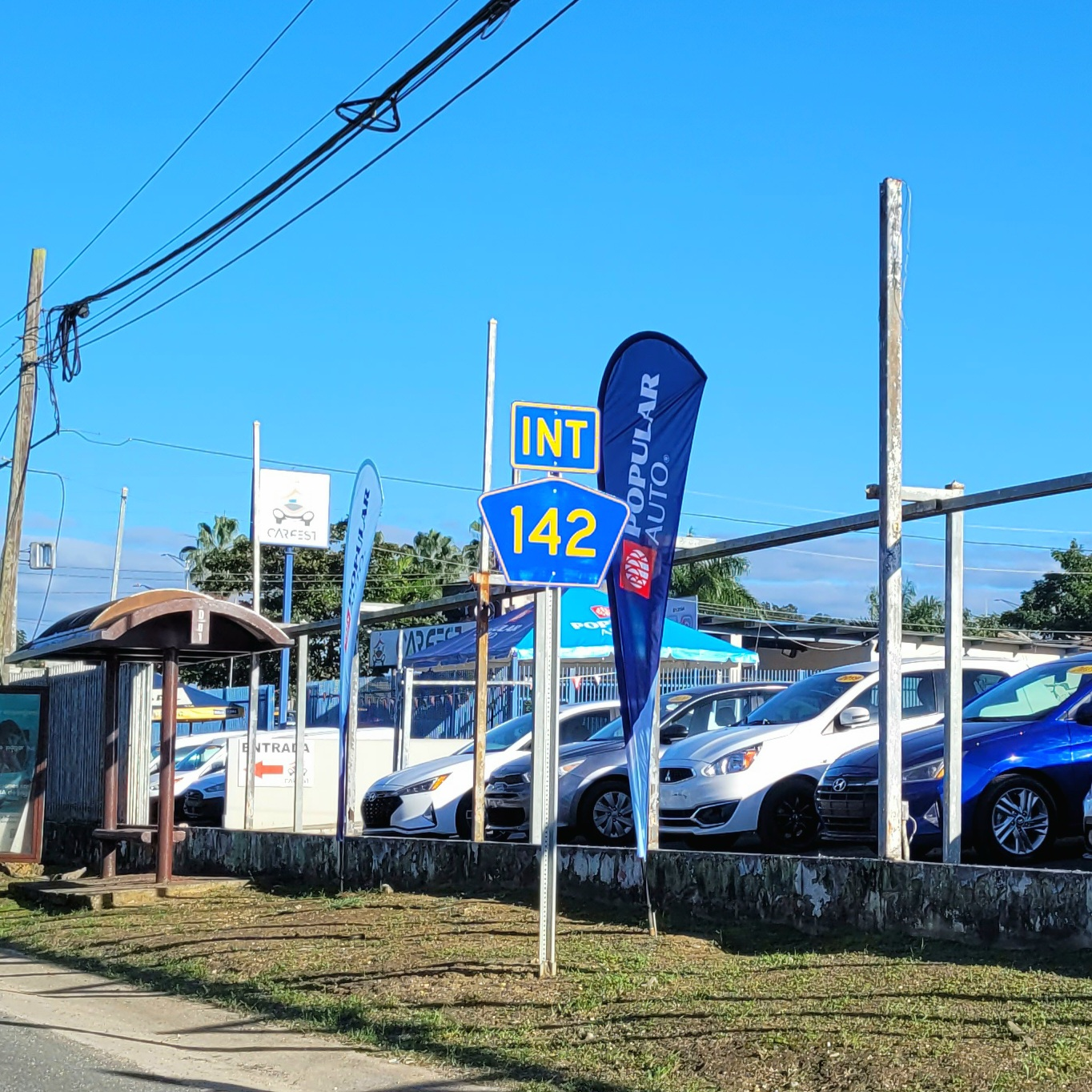
PR-2 east near the northern terminus of PR-142 in Espinosa, Dorado

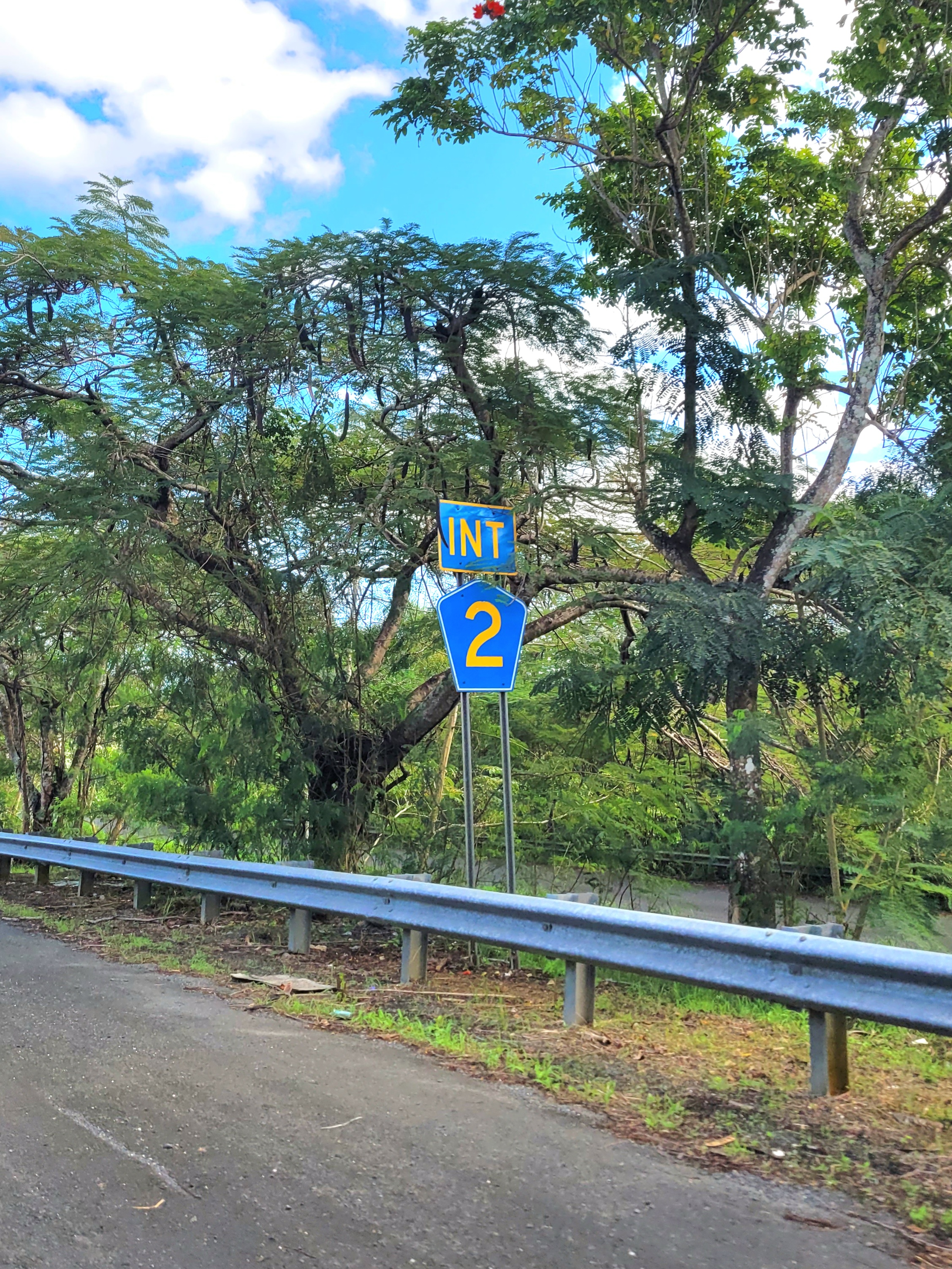
PR-142 north approaching PR-2 interchange in Espinosa, Dorado

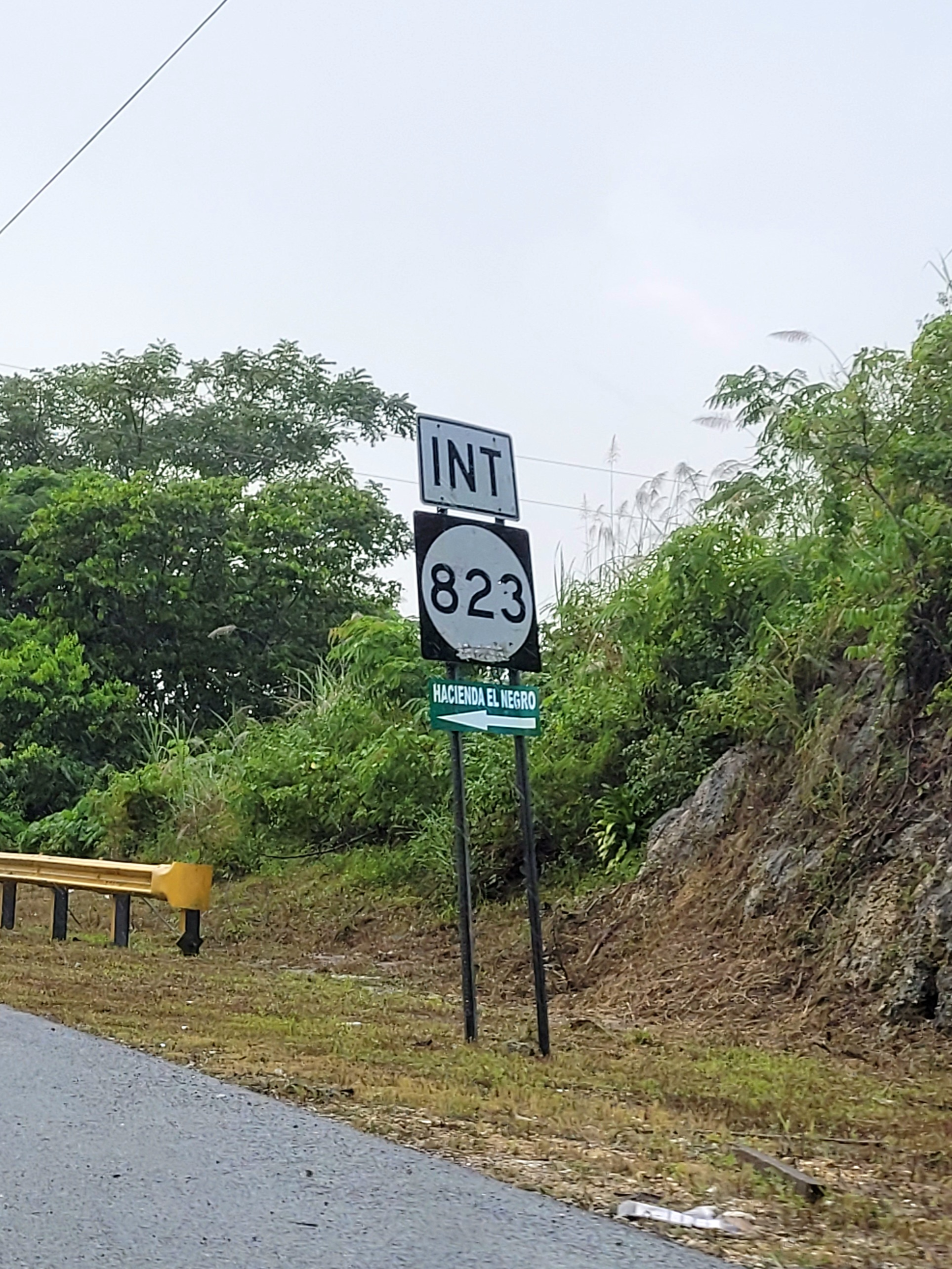
PR-142 south near the northern terminus of PR-823 concurrency in Río Lajas, Toa Alta

Municipality	Location	km	mi	Destinations	Notes
Corozal	Pueblo	8.2	5.1	PR-159 – Toa Alta, Morovis	Southern terminus of PR-142; access to Área de Pesca Embalse La Plata and Centro Histórico-Turístico del Cibuco
Corozal	Abras	7.6– 7.3	4.7– 4.5	Calle Marginal (unsigned)	One-way street; southbound exit and entrance; Calle Marginal means frontage road
Toa Alta	Río Lajas	4.95	3.08	PR-823 – Toa Alta	Southern terminus of PR-823 concurrency; access to Quebrada Arenas
Toa Alta	Río Lajas	4.0	2.5	PR-823 – Marzán	Northern terminus of PR-823 concurrency; access to PR-820
Dorado	Espinosa	2.5	1.6	PR-677 – Rufo Rodríguez	
Dorado	Espinosa	1.3	0.81	PR-677 – La PRRA, Los Rodríguez	
Dorado	Espinosa–Maguayo line	0.0	0.0	PR-2 – San Juan, Arecibo	Northern terminus of PR-142; trumpet interchange
1.000 mi = 1.609 km; 1.000 km = 0.621 mi: Concurrency terminus; Incomplete access
