= Río Lajas, Toa Alta, Puerto Rico =

Barrio of Puerto Rico

Río Lajas
- Barrio
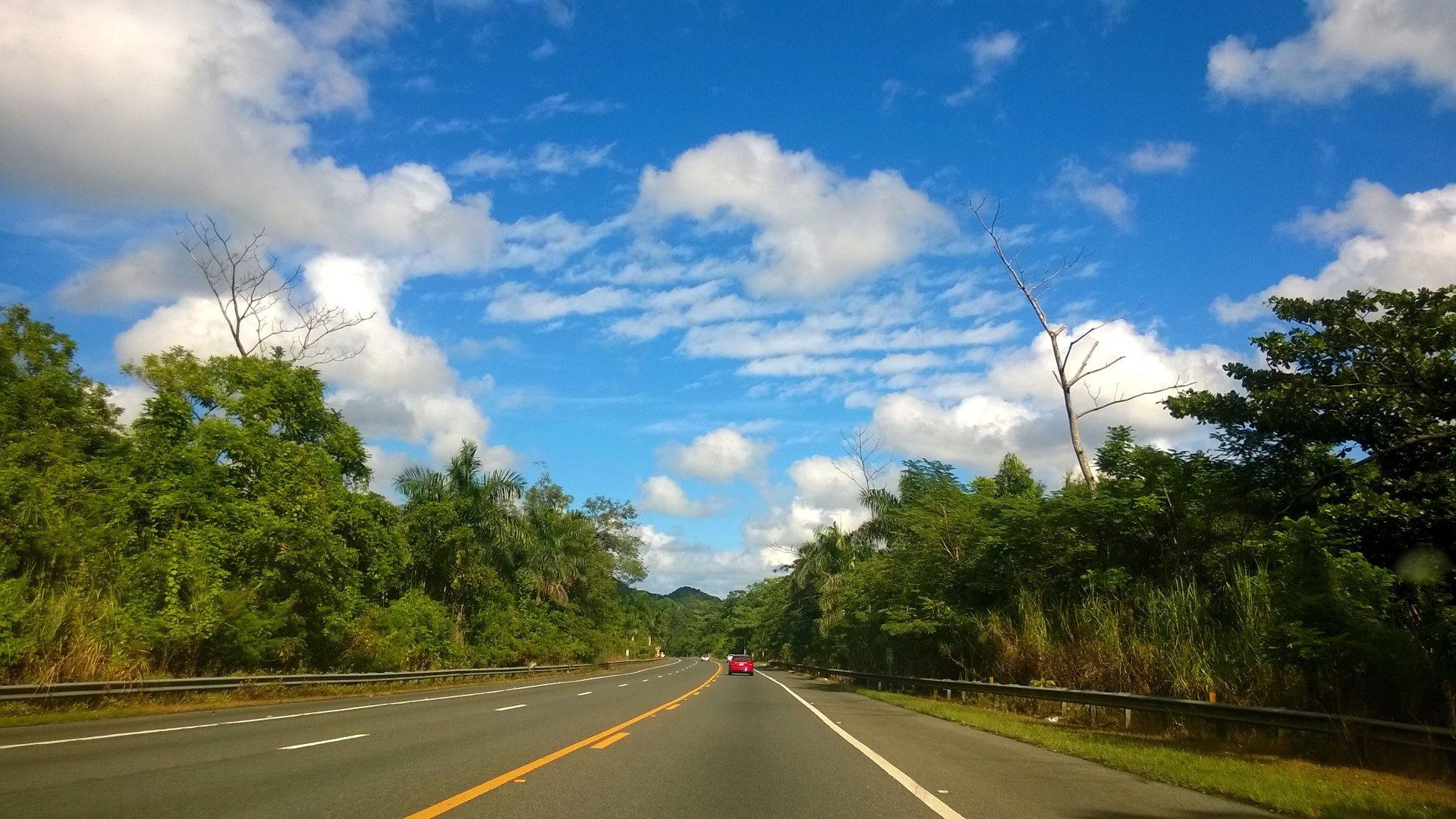
- Puerto Rico Highway 142 in Río Lajas

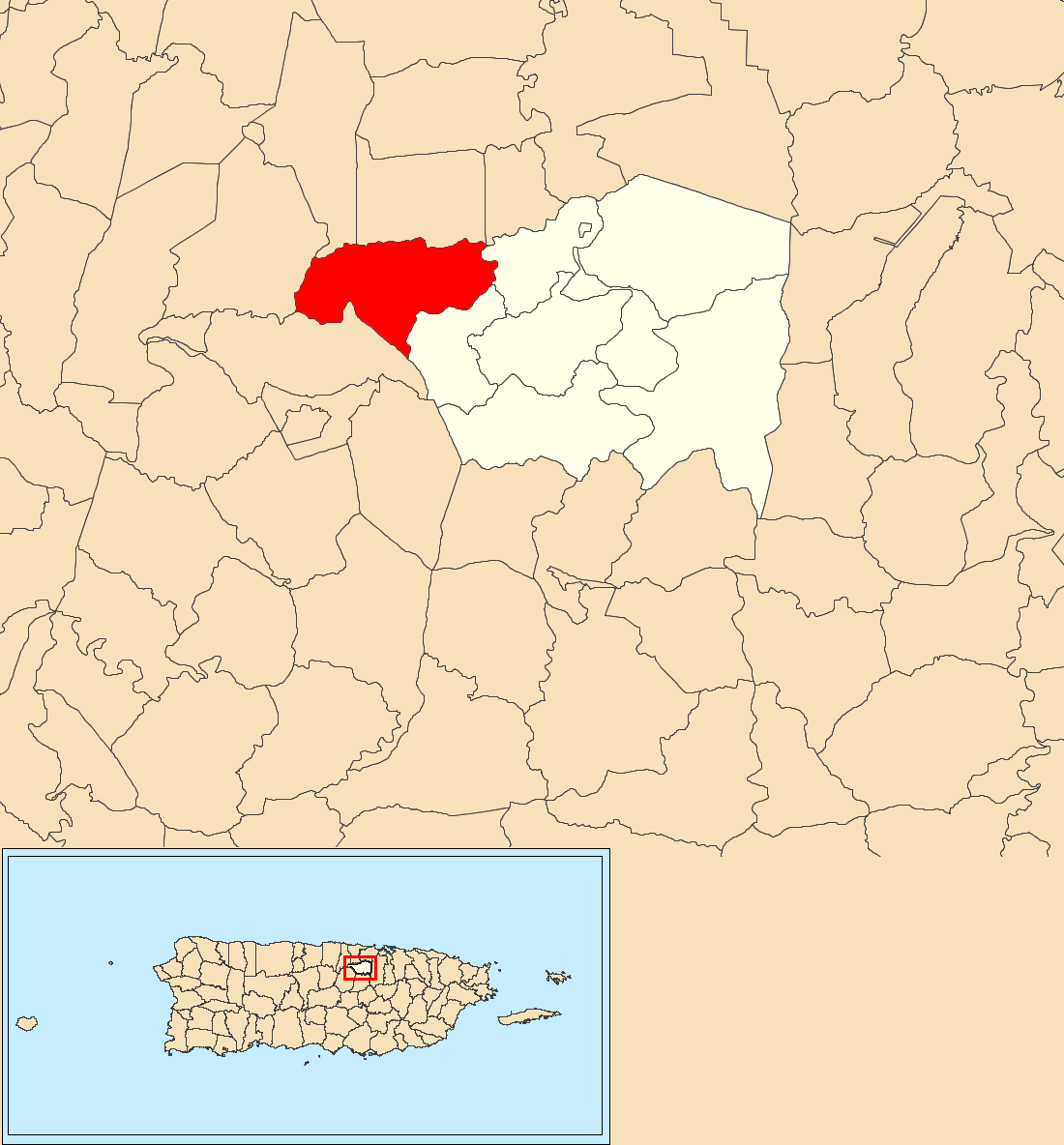
- Location of Río Lajas within the municipality of Toa Alta shown in red

- Location of Puerto Rico
- Coordinates: 18°22′34″N 66°17′40″W
- Commonwealth: Puerto Rico
- Municipality: Toa Alta

Area
  - Total: 3.73 sq mi (9.7 km^{2})
  - Land: 3.73 sq mi (9.7 km^{2})
  - Water: 0 sq mi (0 km^{2})
- Elevation: 394 ft (120 m)

Population (2010)
  - Total: 2,566
  - Density: 687.9/sq mi (265.6/km^{2})
- Source: 2010 Census
- Time zone: UTC−4 (AST)

Río Lajas is a barrio in the municipality of Toa Alta, Puerto Rico. Its population in 2010 was 2,566.

Historical population
Census	Pop.	Note	%±
1900	973		—
1910	1,256		29.1%
1920	1,519		20.9%
1930	1,393		−8.3%
1940	1,420		1.9%
1950	1,340		−5.6%
1960	1,078		−19.6%
1970	883		−18.1%
1980	976		10.5%
1990	1,481		51.7%
2000	2,082		40.6%
2010	2,566		23.2%
U.S. Decennial Census; 1899 (shown as 1900) 1910-1930; 1930-1950 1980-2000 2010

== History ==
Río Lajas was in Spain's gazetteers until Puerto Rico was ceded by Spain in the aftermath of the Spanish–American War under the terms of the Treaty of Paris of 1898 and became an unincorporated territory of the United States. In 1899, the United States Department of War conducted a census of Puerto Rico finding that the population of Río Lajas barrio was 973.

== Sectors ==
Barrios (which are, in contemporary times, roughly comparable to minor civil divisions) in turn are further subdivided into smaller local populated place areas/units called sectores (sectors in English). The types of sectores may vary, from normally sector to urbanización to reparto to barriada to residencial, among others.

The following sectors are in Río Lajas barrio:

Calles: Almendro, Cedro, Bambú, Deloniz, Guayacán, Higüero, Laurel, Jacaranda, Kamani, India Laurel, Maga, Níspero, Ébano, Potones, Ceiba, Ibisco, Sector Jazmín, Sector La Cuchilla, Sector Marrero, Sector Marzán, Sector Nilo, Sector Rivera, Sector Ayala, Sector Rufo Rodríguez, Urbanización Haciendas de Dorado, Urbanización Valle del Paraíso, Urbanización Vista del Río I, and Urbanización Vista del Río III.

== Gallery ==
Puerto Rico Highway 820 in Río Lajas

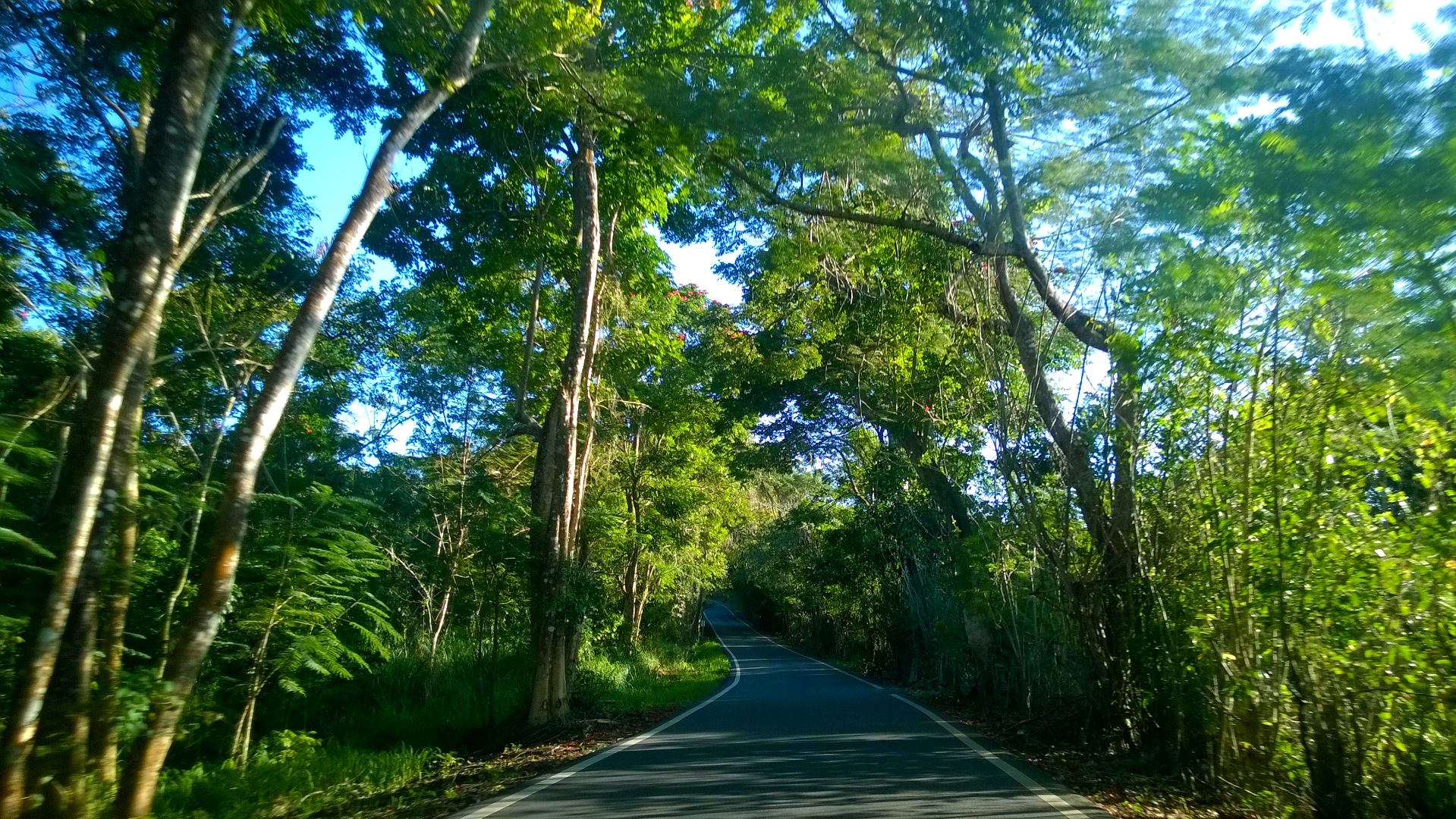
Puerto Rico Highway 823 in Río Lajas

== See also ==
- List of communities in Puerto Rico
- List of barrios and sectors of Toa Alta, Puerto Rico
