= Maricao, Vega Alta, Puerto Rico =

Barrio of Puerto Rico

Maricao
- Barrio
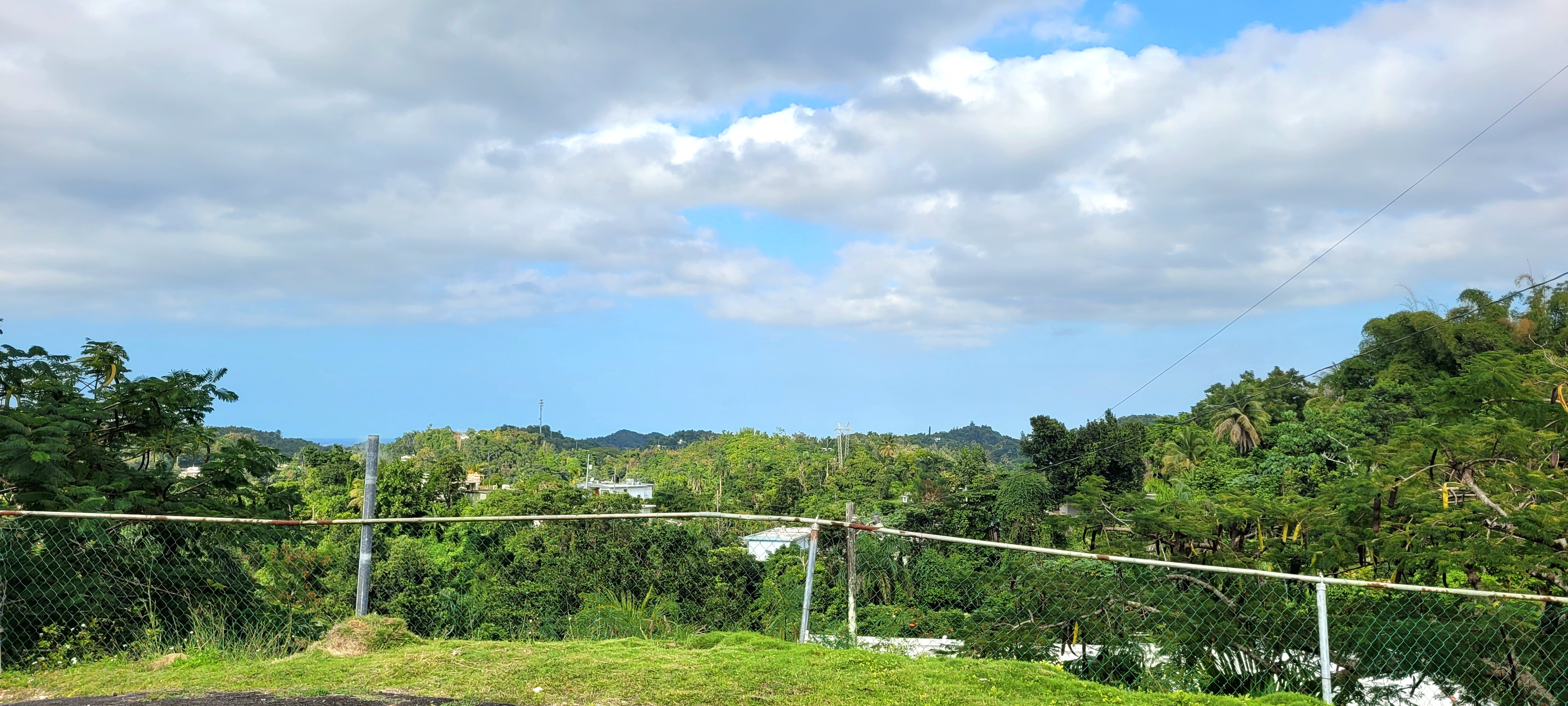
- View from Sector González in Maricao

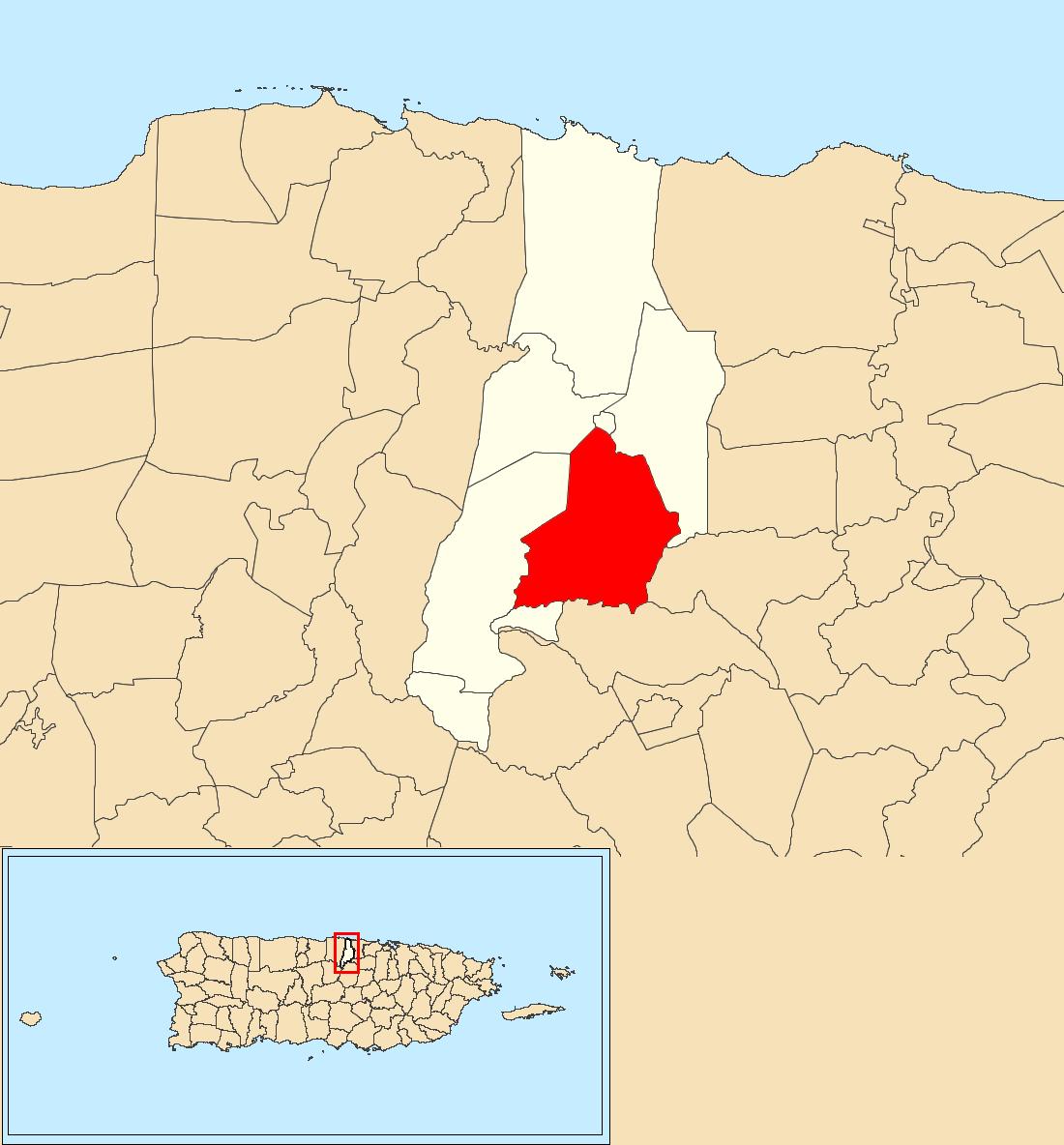
- Location of Maricao within the municipality of Vega Alta shown in red

- Location of Puerto Rico
- Coordinates: 18°23′16″N 66°19′53″W
- Commonwealth: Puerto Rico
- Municipality: Vega Alta

Area
  - Total: 4.88 sq mi (12.6 km^{2})
  - Land: 4.88 sq mi (12.6 km^{2})
  - Water: 0 sq mi (0 km^{2})
- Elevation: 449 ft (137 m)

Population (2010)
  - Total: 5,192
  - Density: 1,063.9/sq mi (410.8/km^{2})
- Source: 2010 Census
- Time zone: UTC−4 (AST)

Maricao is a barrio in the municipality of Vega Alta, Puerto Rico. Its population in 2010 was 5,192.

== History ==
Maricao was in Spain's gazetteers until Puerto Rico was ceded by Spain in the aftermath of the Spanish–American War under the terms of the Treaty of Paris of 1898 and became an unincorporated territory of the United States. In 1899, the United States Department of War conducted a census of Puerto Rico finding that the population of Maricao barrio was 741.

Historical population
Census	Pop.	Note	%±
1900	741		—
1910	898		21.2%
1920	1,491		66.0%
1930	1,674		12.3%
1940	2,000		19.5%
1950	2,296		14.8%
1960	2,721		18.5%
1970	0		−100.0%
1980	4,424		—
1990	4,024		−9.0%
2000	4,812		19.6%
2010	5,192		7.9%
U.S. Decennial Census; 1899 (shown as 1900) 1910-1930; 1930-1950 1960 1980-2000 2010

== Gallery ==
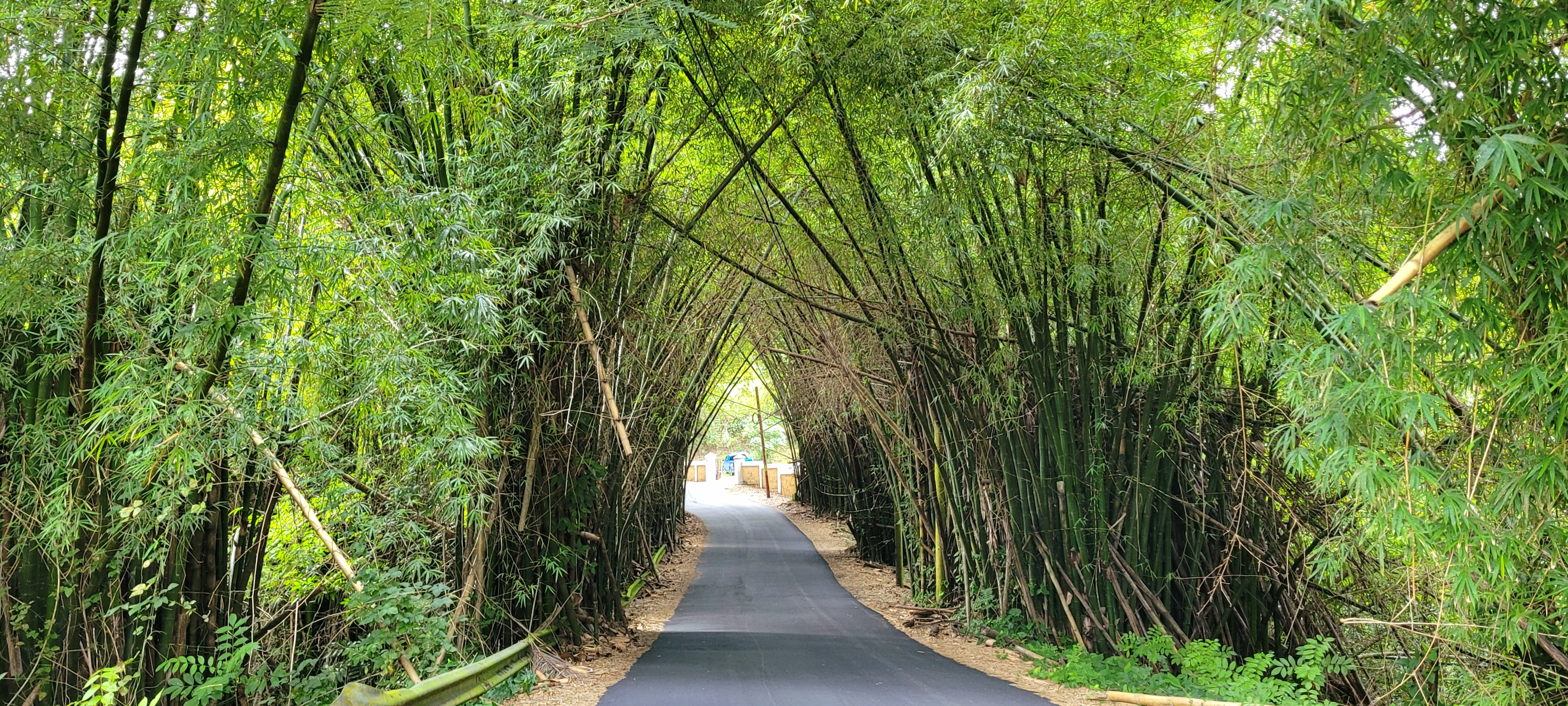
Puerto Rico Highway 677 in Maricao

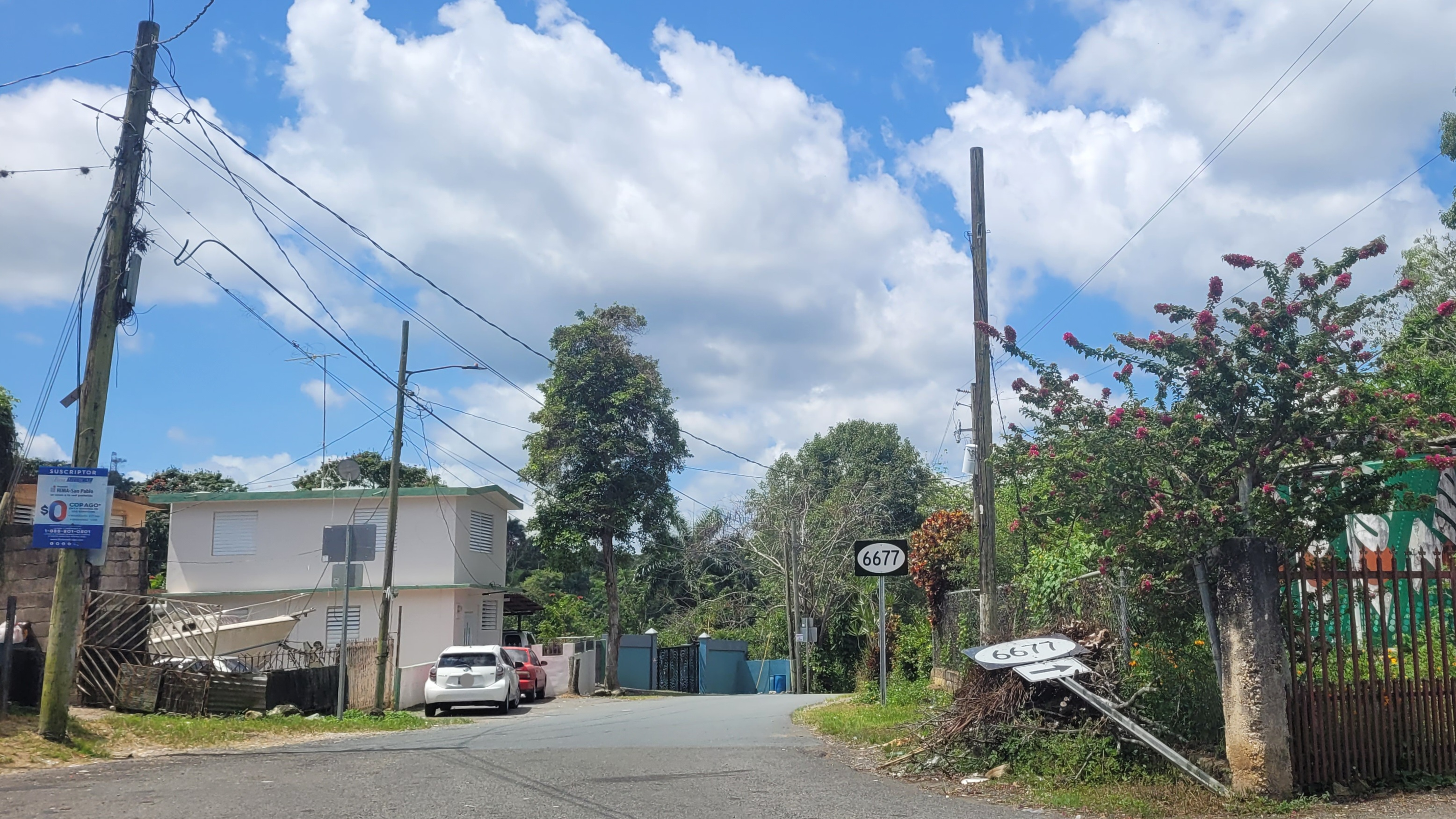
Puerto Rico Highway 6677 in Maricao

== See also ==
- List of communities in Puerto Rico
