= Espinosa, Dorado, Puerto Rico =

Barrio of Puerto Rico

Espinosa
- Barrio
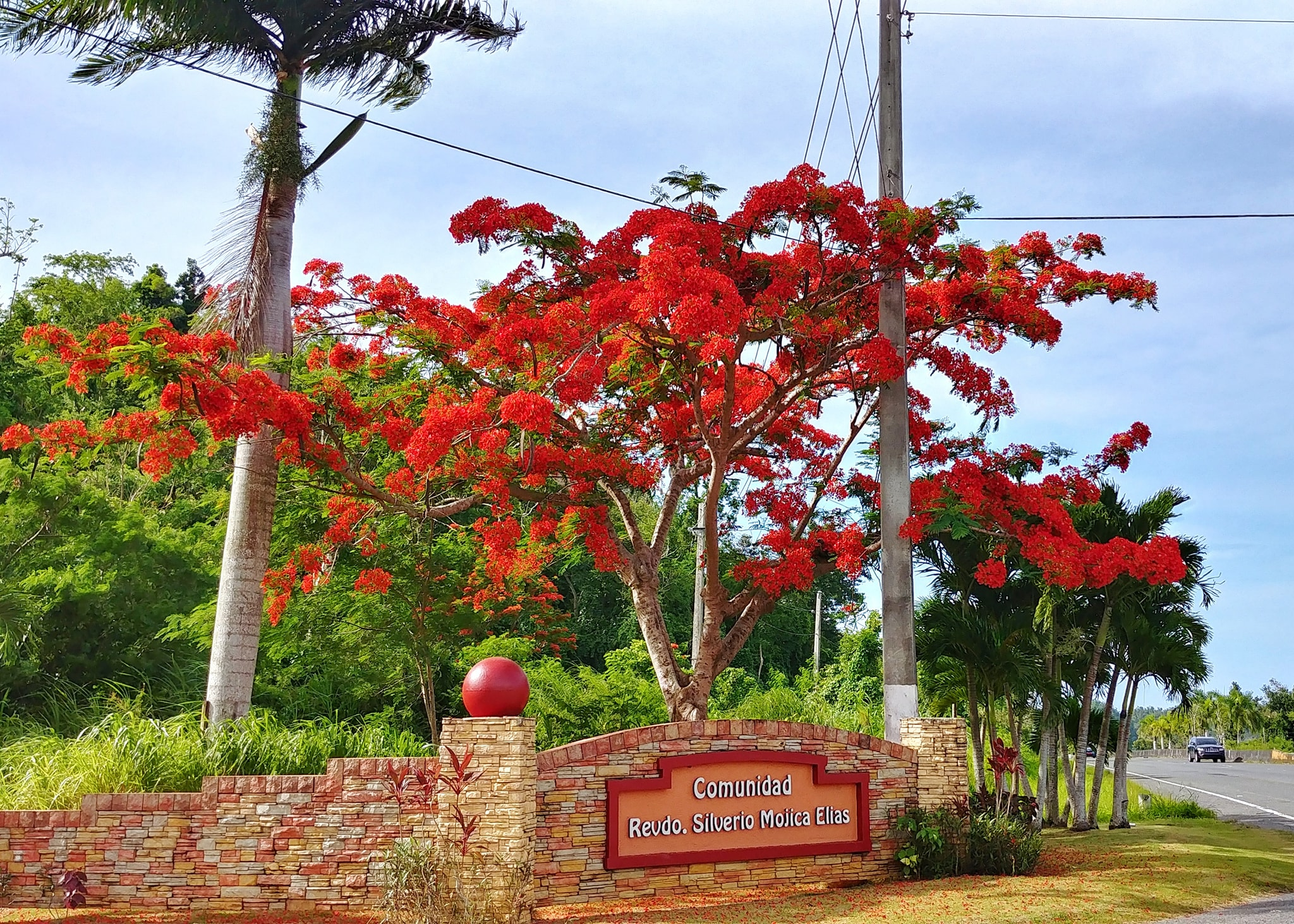
- Flowered flamboyant in Espinosa

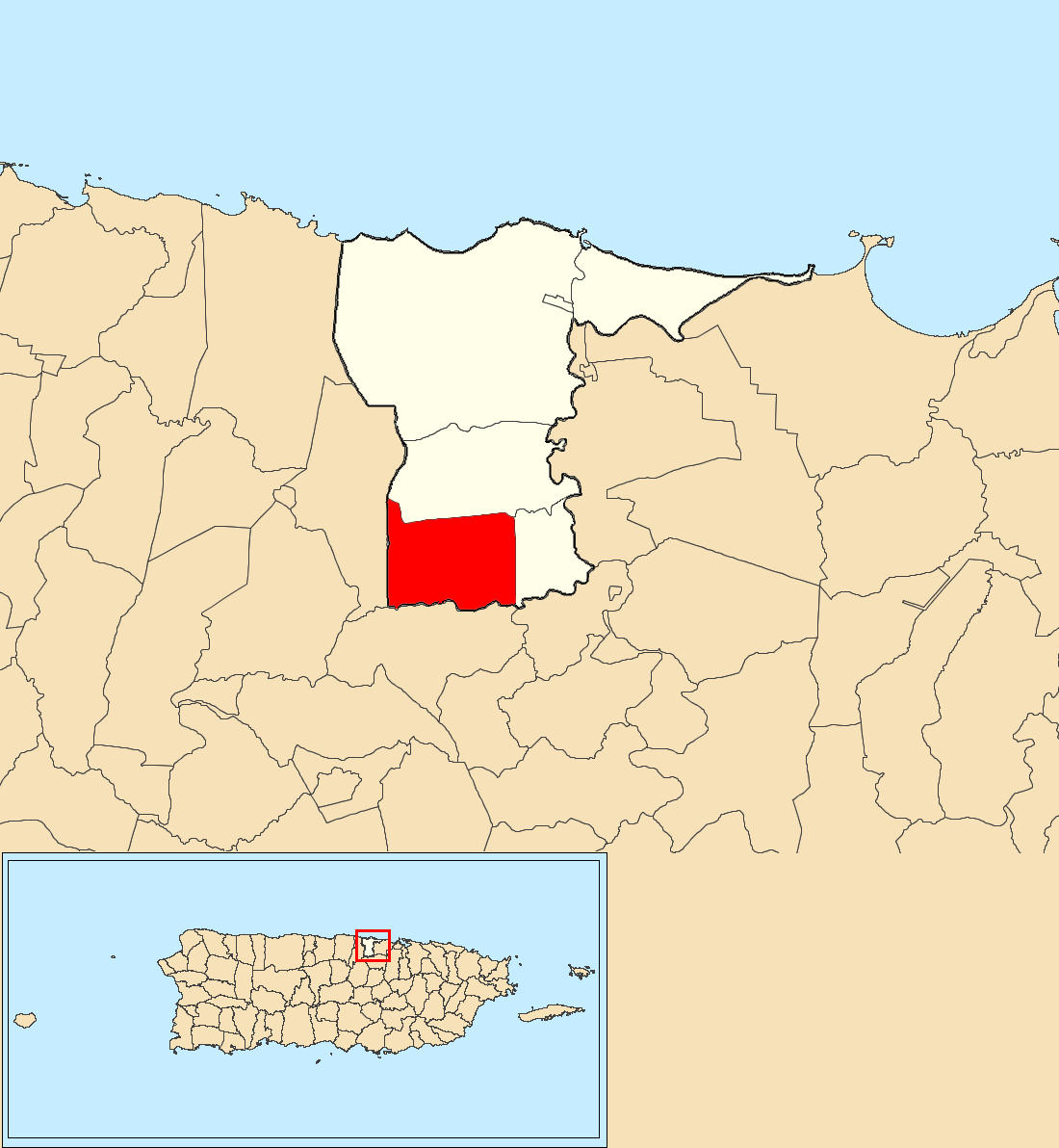
- Location of Espinosa within the municipality of Dorado shown in red

- Location within the Caribbean
- Coordinates: 18°23′52″N 66°17′31″W
- Commonwealth: Puerto Rico
- Municipality: Dorado

Area
  - Total: 3.18 sq mi (8.2 km^{2})
  - Land: 3.17 sq mi (8.2 km^{2})
  - Water: 0.01 sq mi (0.026 km^{2})
- Elevation: 344 ft (105 m)

Population (2010)
  - Total: 4,534
  - Density: 1,430.3/sq mi (552.2/km^{2})
- Source: 2010 Census
- Time zone: UTC−4 (AST)
- ZIP Code: 00646

Espinosa is a barrio in the municipality of Dorado, Puerto Rico. Its population in 2010 was 4,534.

== Sectors ==
Barrios (which are, in contemporary times, roughly comparable to minor civil divisions) in turn are further subdivided into smaller local populated place areas/units called sectores (sectors in English). The types of sectores may vary, from normally sector to urbanización to reparto to barriada to residencial, among others.

The following sectors are in Espinosa barrio:

Apartamentos Altos de Miraflores, Comunidad Fortuna Comunidad La PRRA, Comunidad Río Nuevo, Parcelas Kuilan, PR-2 stretch (both sides between kilometers 25.4 and 28.0), Reparto Del Valle, Sector Abayarde, Sector Concepción, Sector Cuba Libre, Sector Guarisco, Sector Jácana, Sector Kuilan, Sector La Línea, Sector Laguna I y II, Sector Los Morales, Sector Mavito, Sector Reparto Dorado, Sector Rodríguez, Sector Romanes, Sector Silverio Mojica (Chícharo), Sector Tiburón, Urbanización Golden Hills, Urbanización Haciendas de Dorado, Urbanización Los Montes, Urbanización Miraflores, Urbanización Monte Bello, Urbanización Monte Mar, Urbanización Monte Mayor, Urbanización Monte Real, Urbanización Monte Sol, Urbanización Monte Verde, Urbanización Palmar Dorado, and Urbanización Valle Dorado.

Antigua Escuela Teresa Préstamo, an elementary school was located in the Mavito sector of Espinosa barrio until its closure in 2018.

== History ==
Espinosa was in Spain's gazetteers until Puerto Rico was ceded by Spain in the aftermath of the Spanish–American War under the terms of the Treaty of Paris of 1898 and became an unincorporated territory of the United States. In 1899, the United States Department of War conducted a census of Puerto Rico finding that the population of Espinosa barrio was 787.

Historical population
Census	Pop.	Note	%±
1900	787		—
1910	776		−1.4%
1920	994		28.1%
1930	1,206		21.3%
1940	1,414		17.2%
1950	1,813		28.2%
1960	2,002		10.4%
1970	2,603		30.0%
1980	2,863		10.0%
1990	3,150		10.0%
2000	3,222		2.3%
2010	4,534		40.7%
U.S. Decennial Census; 1899 (shown as 1900) 1910-1930; 1930-1950 1980-2000 2010

Drug trafficking has been an issue in Puerto Rico for many years and in early 1990, $43 million in cash was found buried in plastic barrels, thought to have been deposited by drug smugglers for later retrieval. The sudden wealth of a few residents attracted attention and prompted an investigation by FBI and local police. By May 1990, the FBI had traced $11 million and seized and confiscated property and goods purchased with the money, which was said to belong to drug lord Ramon Torres Gonzalez. FBI stated the money was located on his farm in the Tiburón sector of Espinosa in Dorado and filed charges shortly after.

== Gallery ==
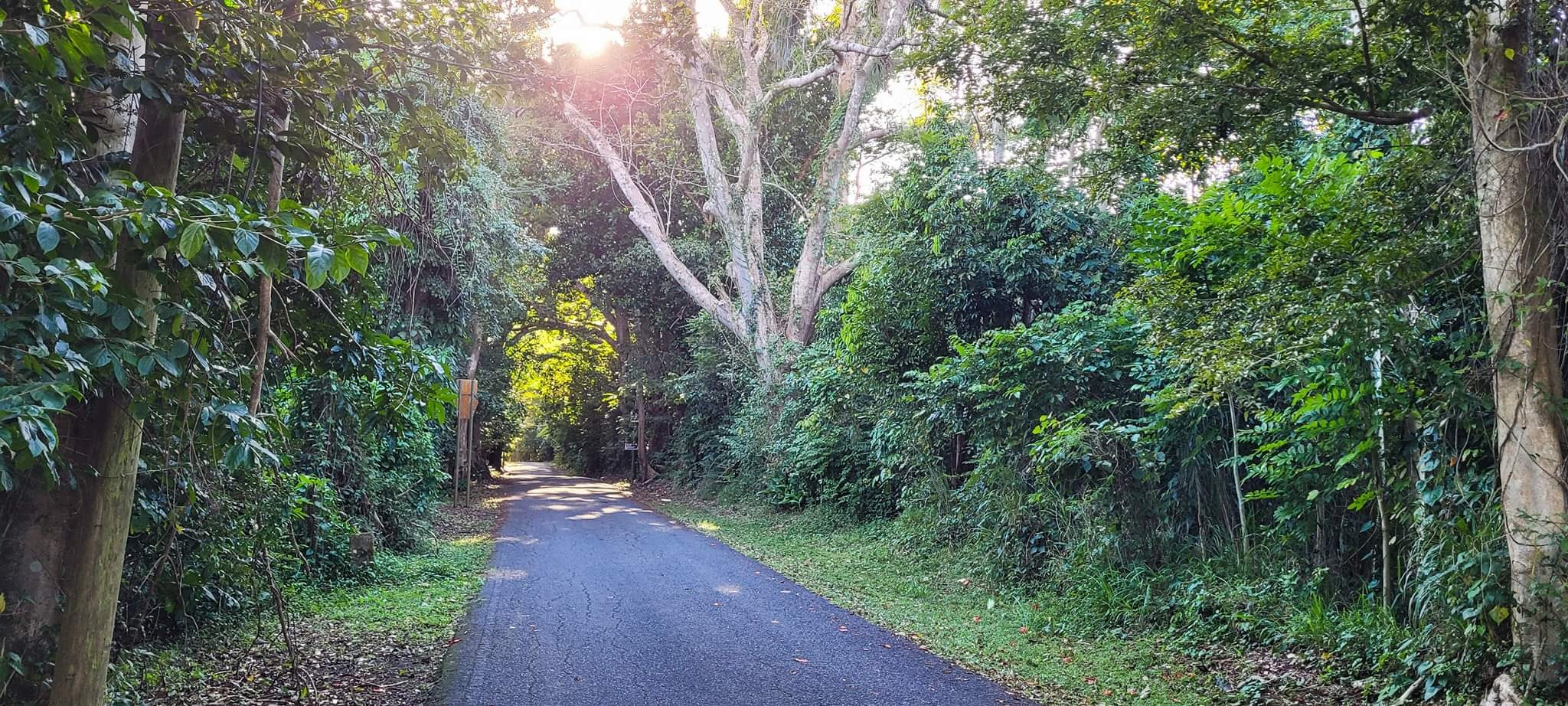
Puerto Rico Highway 677 in Espinosa

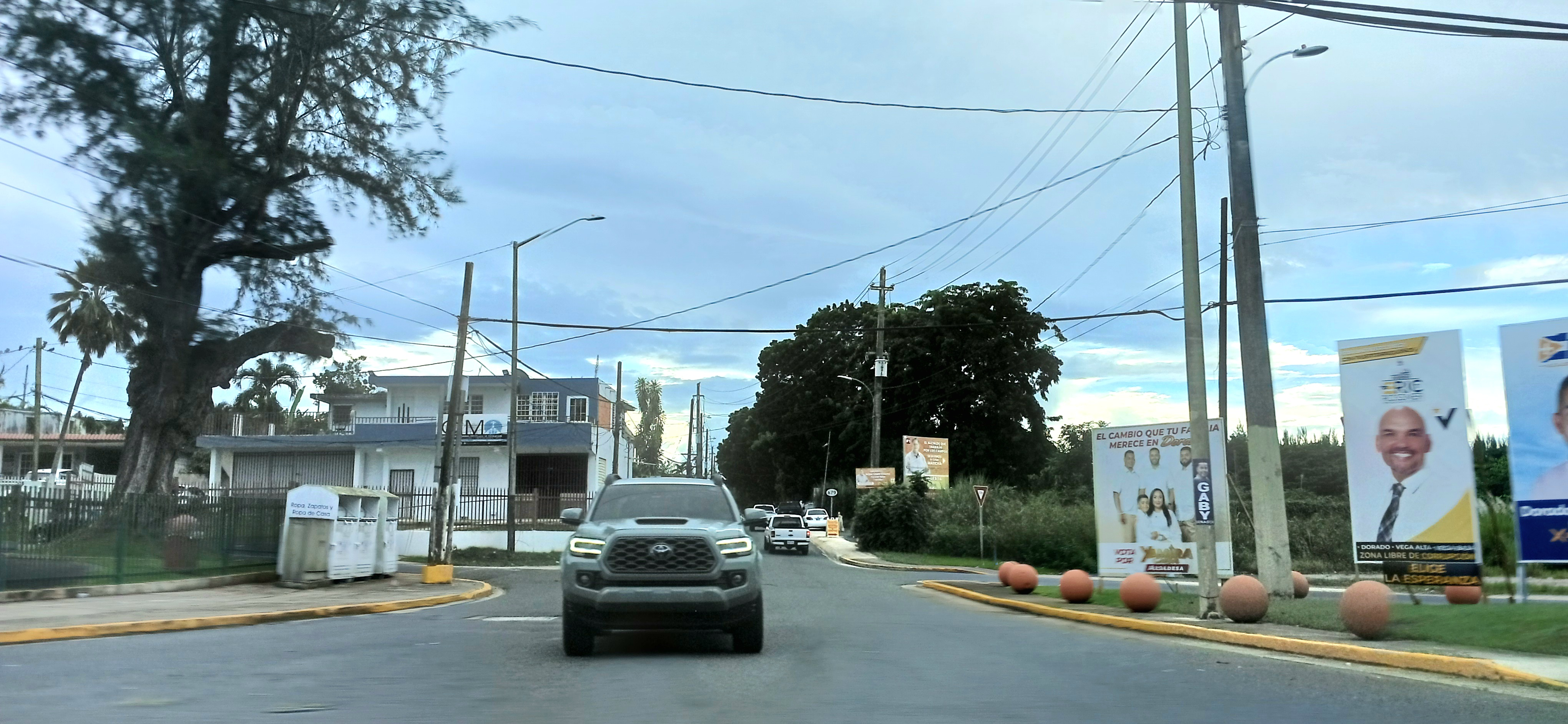
Puerto Rico Highway 679 in Espinosa

== See also ==
- List of communities in Puerto Rico
- List of barrios and sectors of Dorado, Puerto Rico
