= Contorno (disambiguation) =

Contorno refers to a side dish in the Italian meal structure.

Contorno may also refer to:

- Contorno (Hannibal), the fifth episode of the third season of the psychological thriller-horror series Hannibal
- Contorno, Toa Alta, Puerto Rico, a barrio in Toa Alta, Puerto Rico
- Salvatore Contorno (born 1946), Italian mobster
