= Hacienda Santa Elena =

- Hacienda "Santa Elena"
- U.S. National Register of Historic Places
- Puerto Rico Historic Sites and Zones
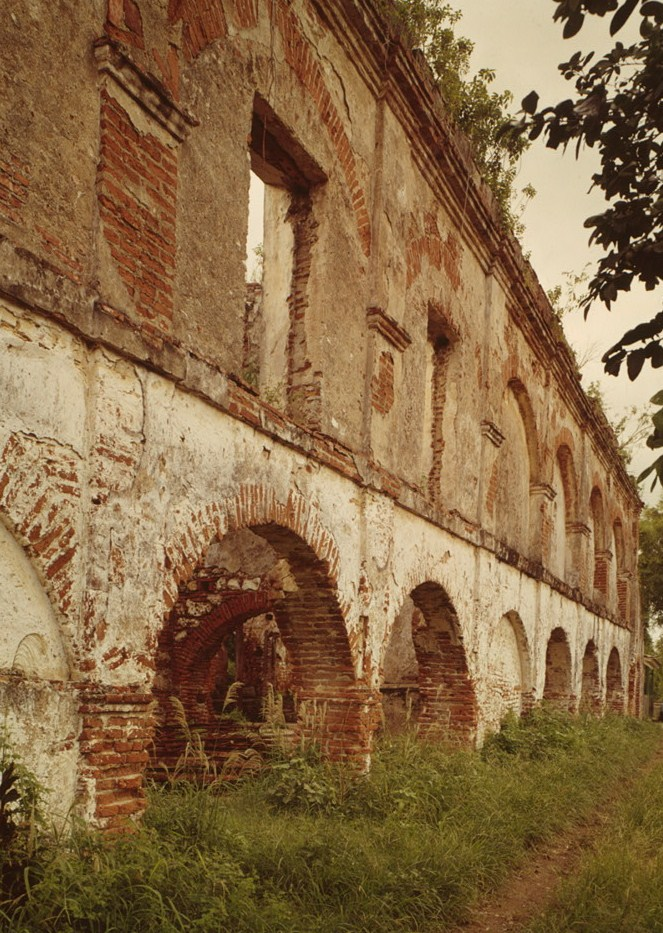
- Mill ruins of Hacienda Santa Elena in 1977.

- Location within Puerto Rico
- Location: North of the junction of PR-2 and PR-165 in Toa Baja, Puerto Rico
- Coordinates: 18°25′50″N 66°15′28″W
- Area: 500 acres (200 ha)
- Built: 1790
- Architect: Juan Rijus Feduchi
- NRHP reference No.: 83004662
- RNSZH No.: 2000-(RMSJ)-00-JP-SH

Significant dates
- Added to NRHP: September 24, 1992
- Designated RNSZH: February 3, 2000

Hacienda Santa Elena is a 500-acre historic sugarcane plantation located in the west bank of La Plata River in the Media Luna area of the municipality of Toa Baja, Puerto Rico. Santa Elena is recognized as a historic monument by the Institute of Puerto Rican Culture (ICP) since 1983, and it was added to the United States National Register of Historic Places in 1992, and on the Puerto Rico Register of Historic Sites and Zones in 2000, as it is the only existing 18th-century industrial complex not only in Puerto Rico but also the Caribbean, in addition to being the oldest existing sugar mill of its kind in the Western Hemisphere.

== History ==
The area where Hacienda Santa Elena is located has been used for agriculture since the early days of the Spanish colonization of Puerto Rico. The fertile flooding plains of the so-called Toa Valley (Valle del Toa) in particular were first developed for agriculture in the mid-1500s during the period of transition between gold mining and the fortification of San Juan in the military development of the island as a defensive and maritime stopover between Spain and the Spanish Main. The two main crops of the area at the time were sugarcane and ginger, which complemented the cattle raising industry for the purpose of meat and leather. By 1647, the sugar industry was the main agricultural activity of the region of San Juan with the Toa Valley being one of the prime sugarcane production centers along with Bayamón and Loíza.

Hacienda Santa Elena was founded in the 18th century, during a time when the sugar production industry was booming after period of industrialization that saw the development of sugar mills and refineries (centrales azucareras) in Puerto Rico and the Caribbean. This was despite the passive and limited distribution of resources towards the development of agriculture by the Spanish Empire as the priority at the time was the control of Puerto Rico as a military defensive stronghold. The establishment of the Bourbon dynasty rule of Spain however brought a rapid diversification in the economic activities and industries in the Spanish colonies inspired by newly integrated ideas from the Enlightenment movement. This resulted in land reforms, spearheaded in the island by figures such as Alejandro O'Reilly, that were quickly established in the Spanish colonial cities of the Americas and allowed for the establishment of plantations such as Hacienda Santa Elena in 1778 which, at the time, was located within the city limits of San Juan. At this time, the agricultural activities of the plantation included the cultivation of corn, tobacco, cotton, coffee, cocoa and plantains. Toa Baja quickly became one of the main crop producers in the island, becoming the second in commercial sugar production and fourth in the production of molasses. The industrial production of rum was also established as a result and, in 1782, an hacendado stated that the best rum in the island was produced here.

Further development of Santa Elena came in the form of industrial advancements in 1790 when it came under the ownership of Juan Rijus Teduchi, an engineer originating in the then French colony of Saint-Domingue who built the refinery and mill system, considered the most modern in Puerto Rico at the time. The property of Santa Elena was sold to a man named Dr. Figueras during the 1820s who introduced steam technology and oversaw a process of modernization that lasted between until the 1830s, making Santa Elena one of the first agricultural sites to be mechanized in the island. In 1890, Hacienda Santa Elena was then sold to Jaime Fonalledas Garriga, a recent immigrant from Catalonia, who became its last owner.

== Architecture ==
Hacienda Santa Elena remains today in the form of the ruins of the main hacienda complex, and the sugarcane mill and the cattle-driven refineries. The buildings are notable in their design: the attention to ornamentation and designs that transcend the merely functional purpose of the structures is evident in the ruins of the hacienda and the mill. Architecturally, he development of Hacienda Santa Elena represents a drastic departure in construction projects away from the military and religious elements that were predominant at the time and into an emerging secular industrial landscape.

=== Hacienda Santa Elena ruins ===
The Santa Elena Hacienda has been in a state of increasing deterioration since the 20th century, and it remains today in the forms of ruins. In addition to blight, several of the buildings and structures have been affected by natural disasters such as hurricanes and the 2020 earthquake.

Archived photographs of the ruins (1968)

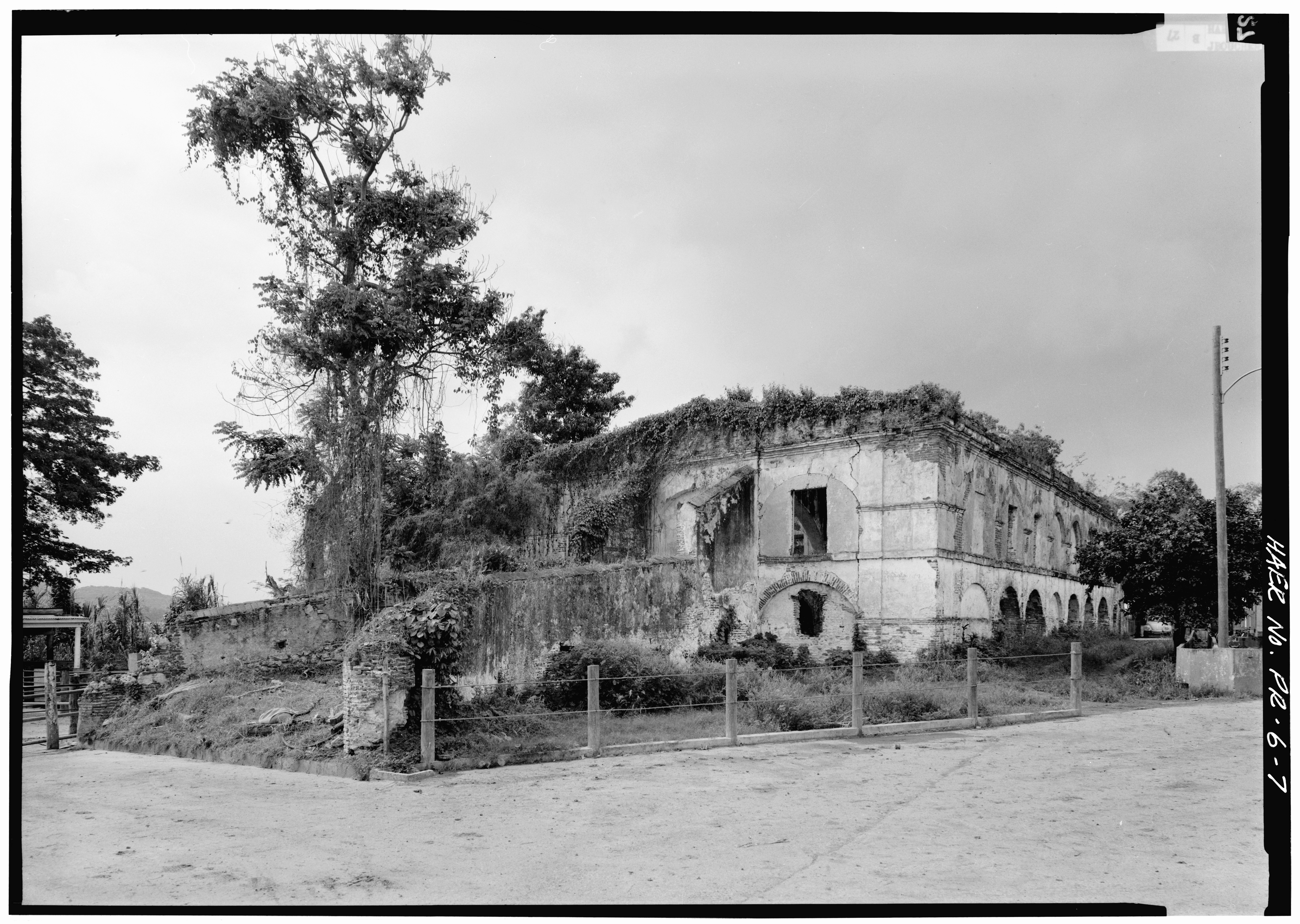

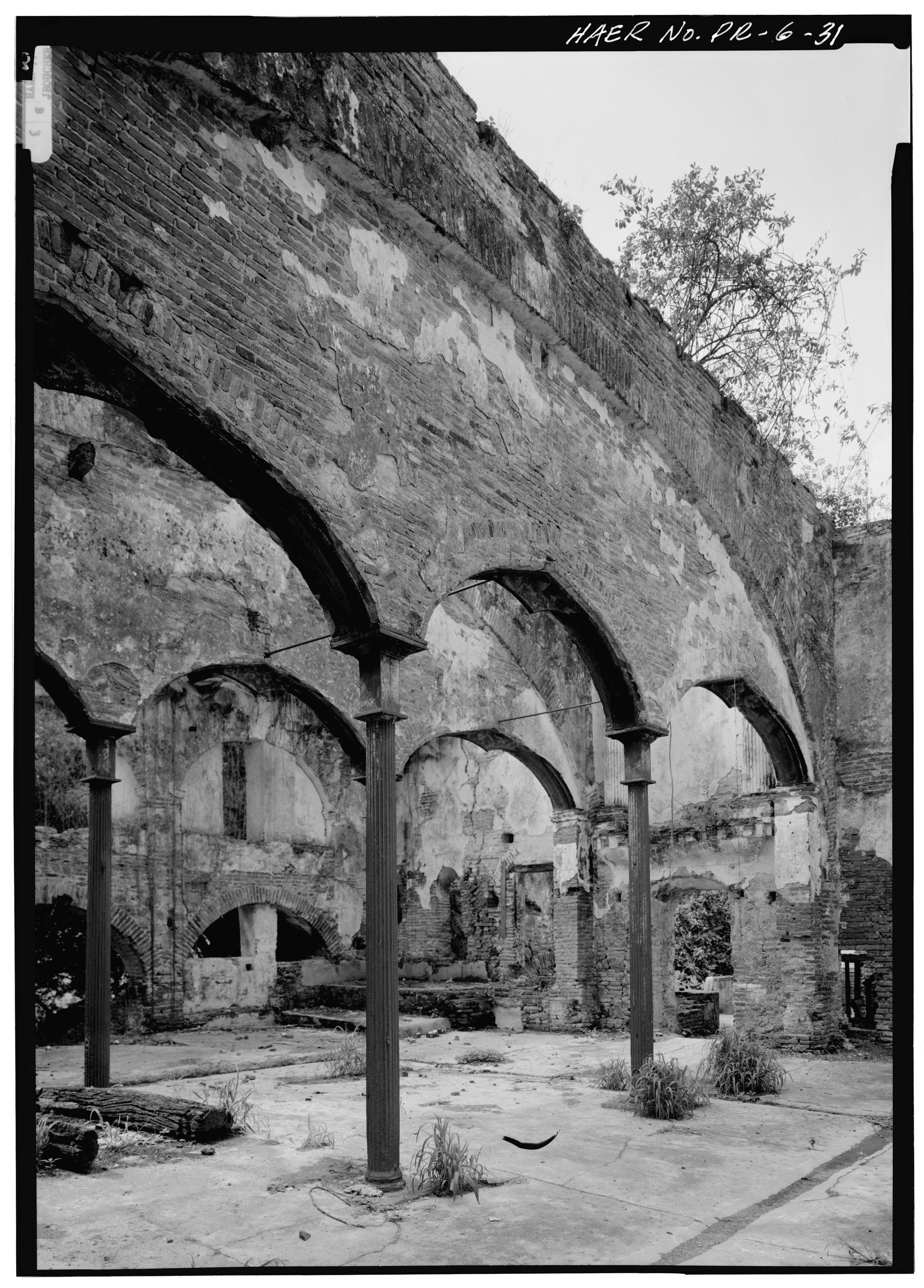

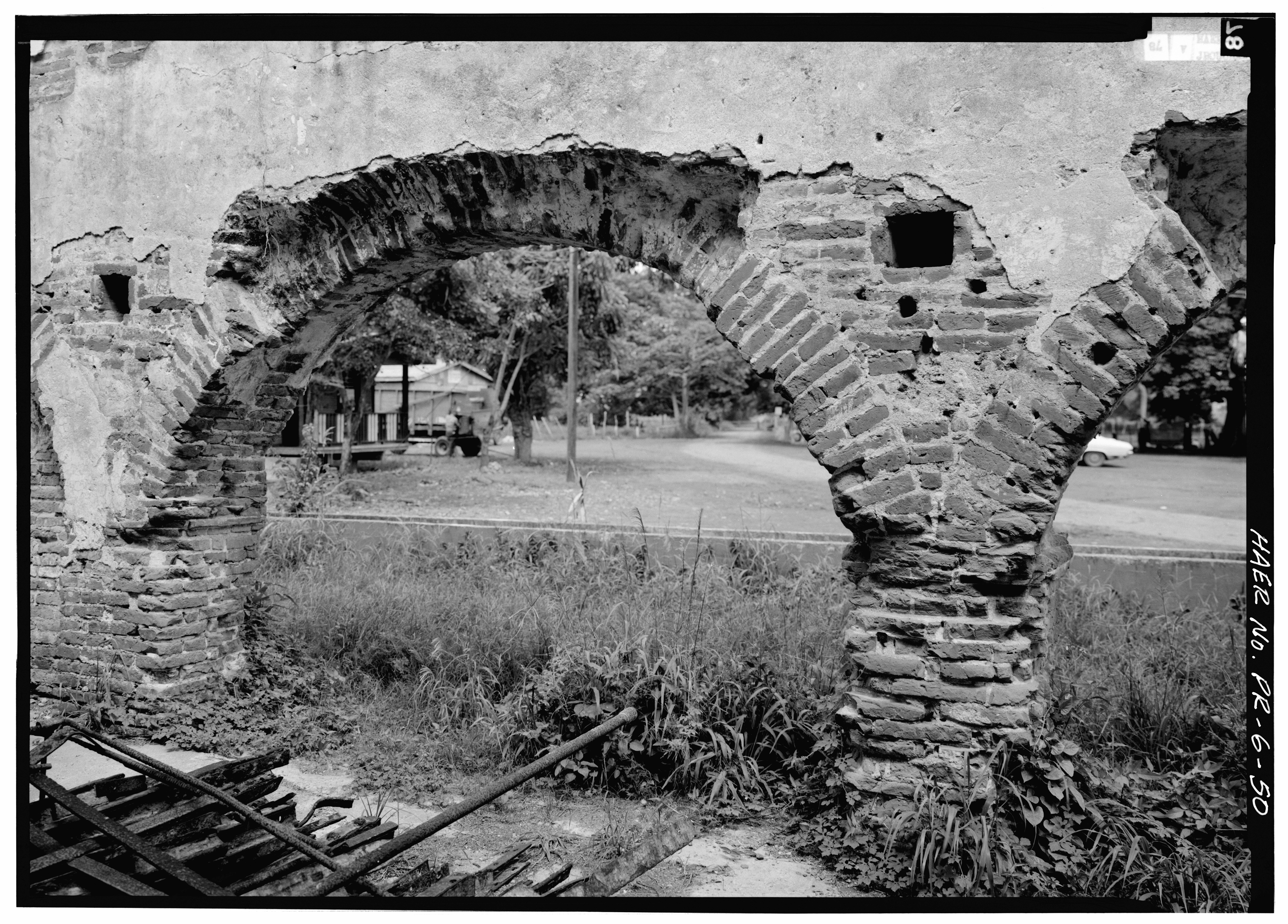

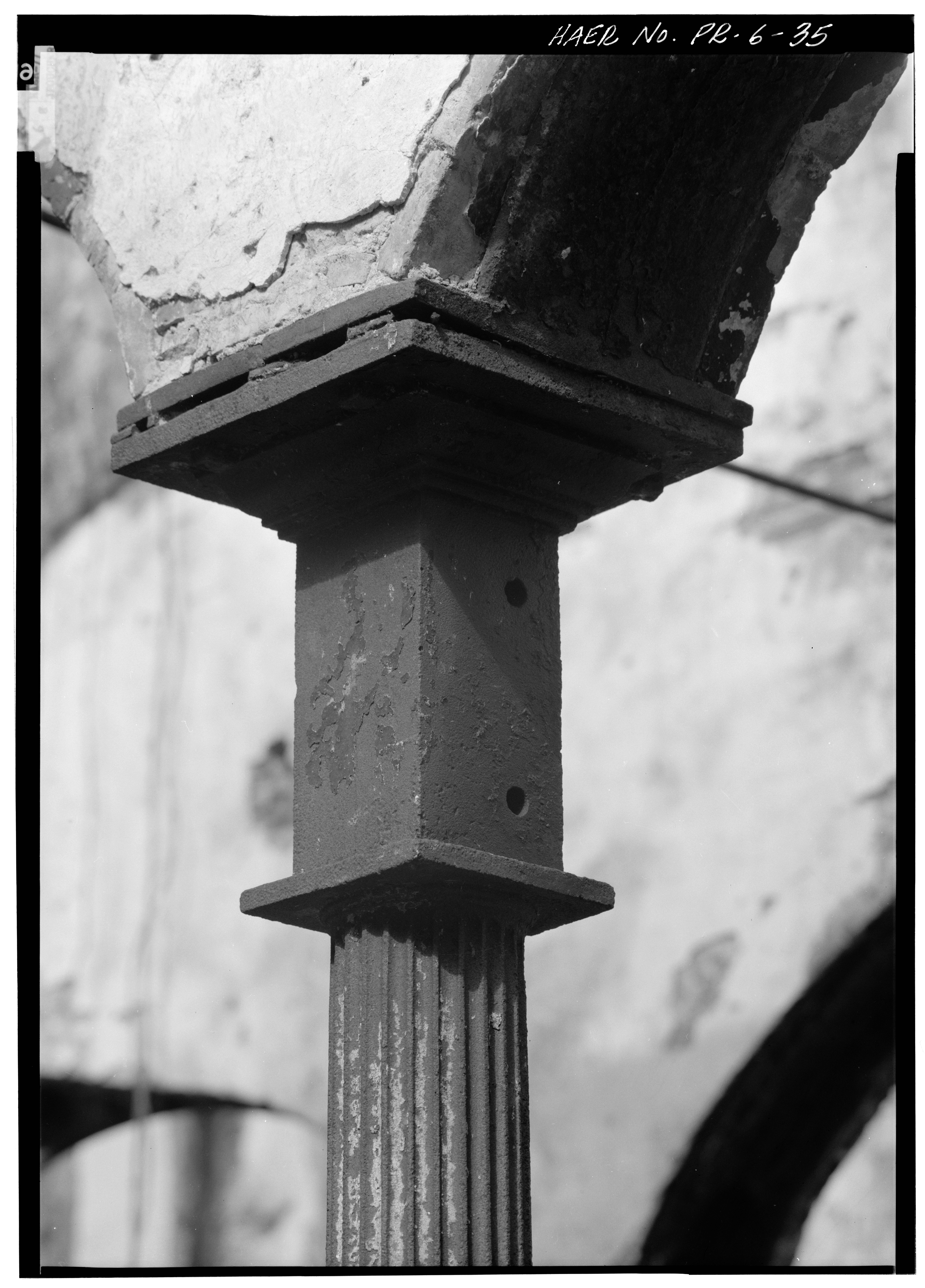

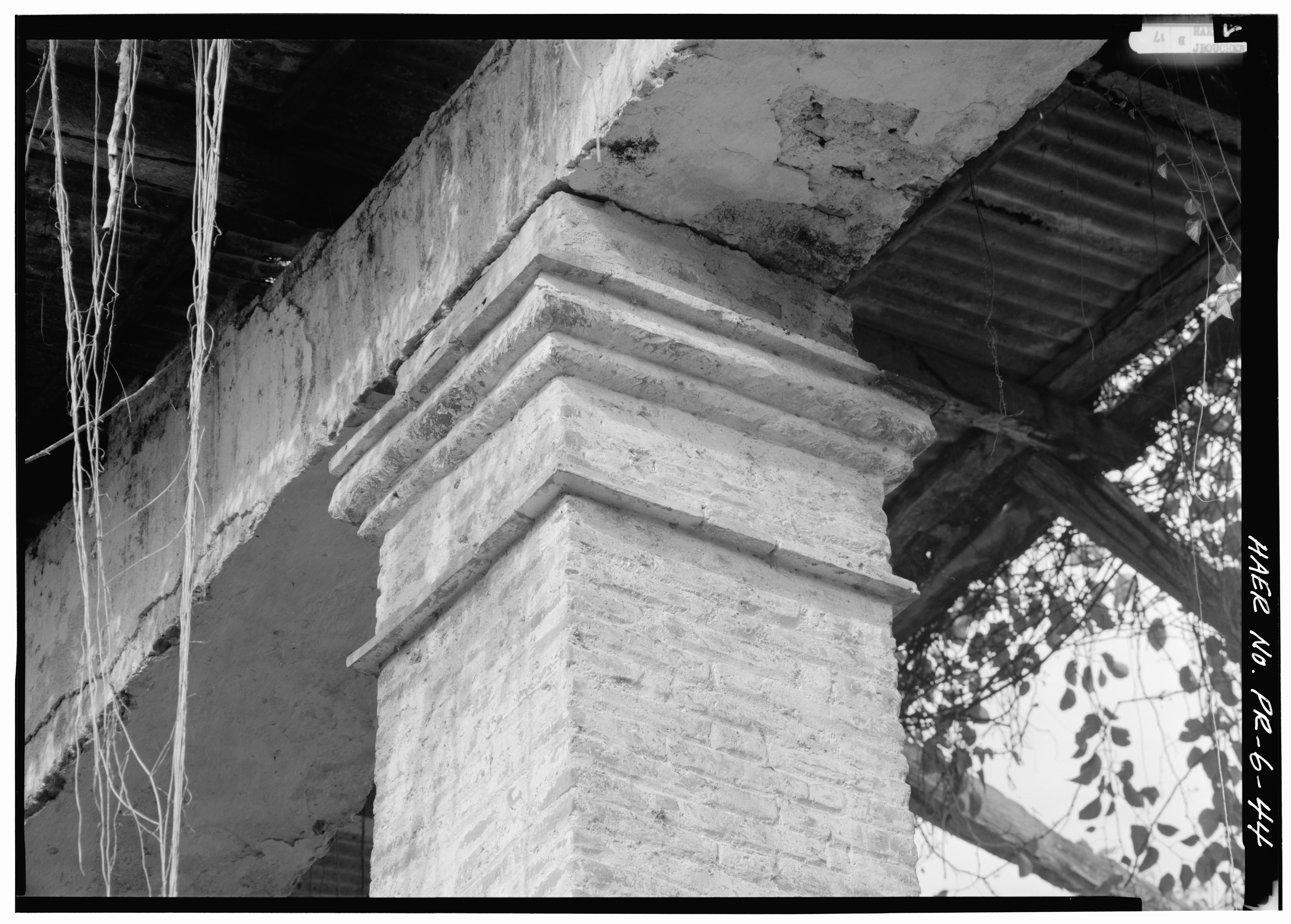

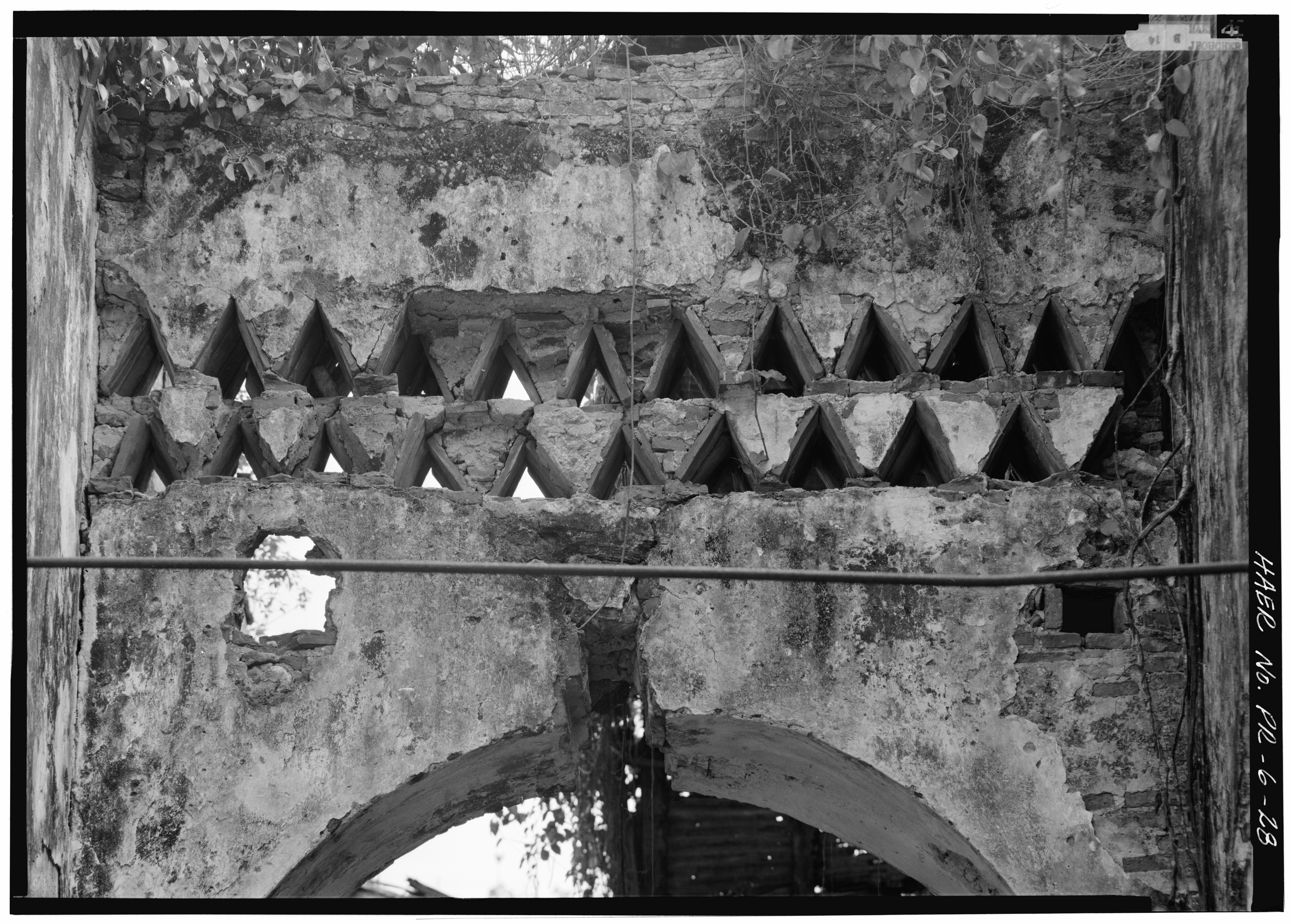

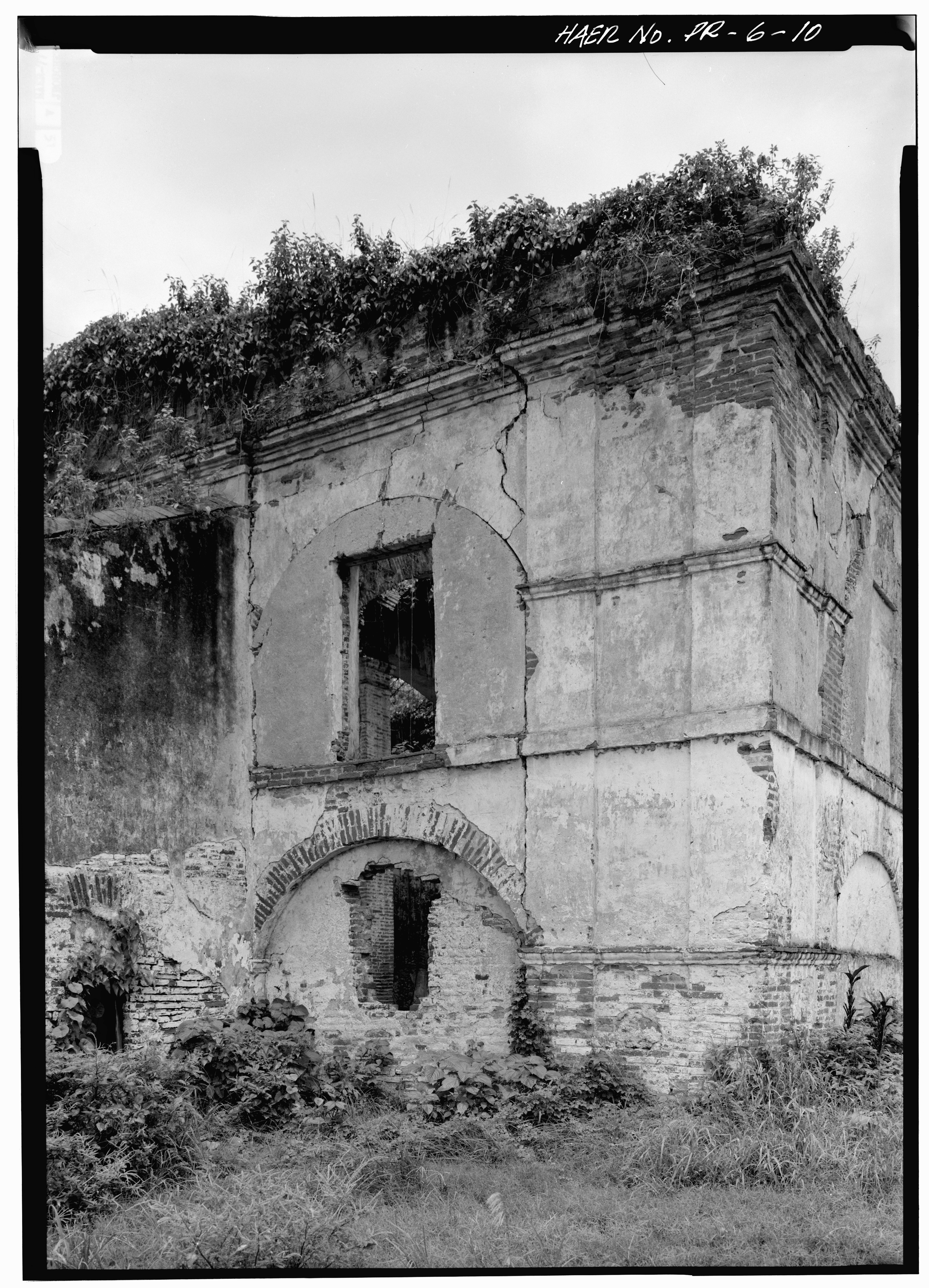

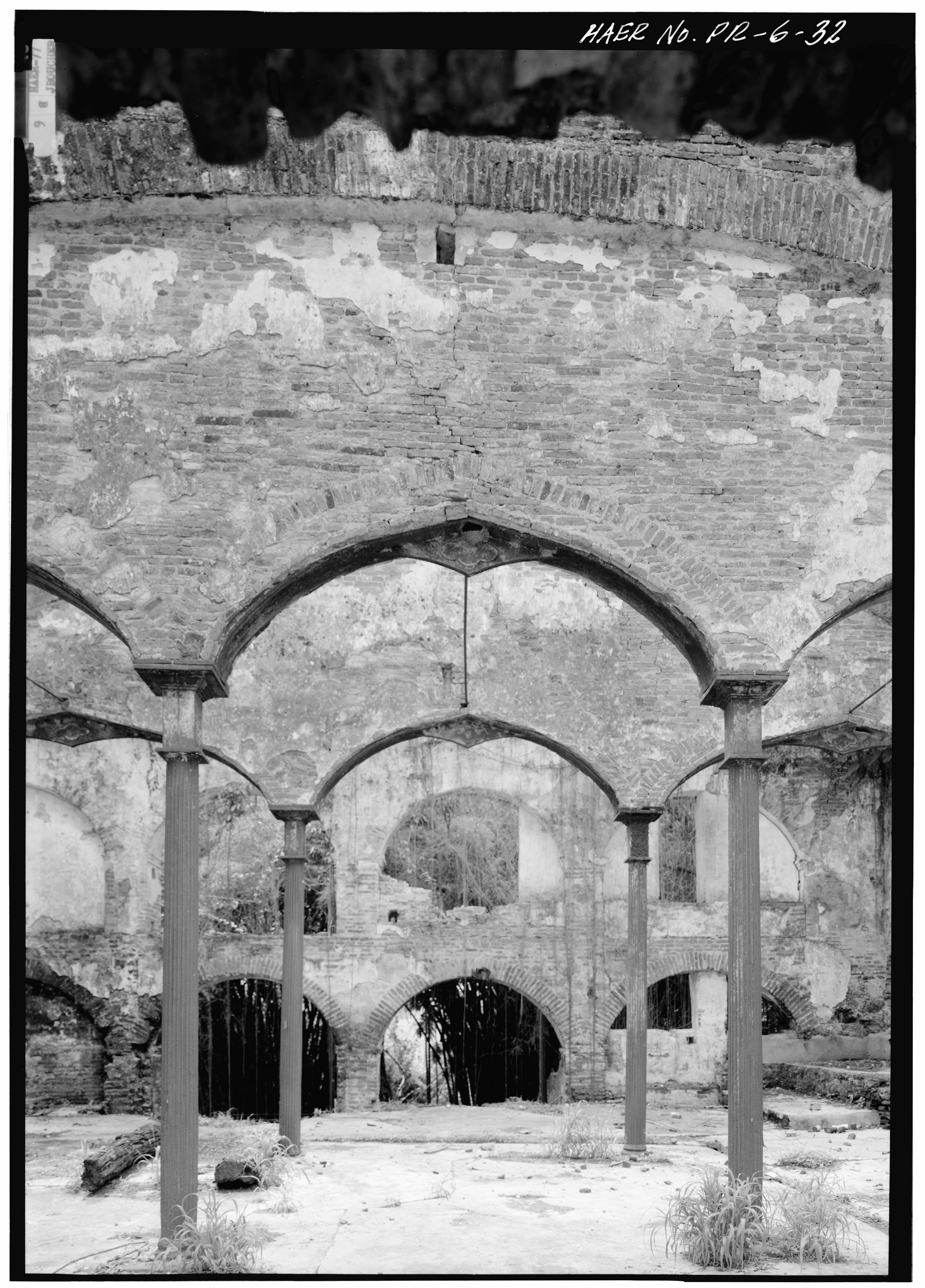

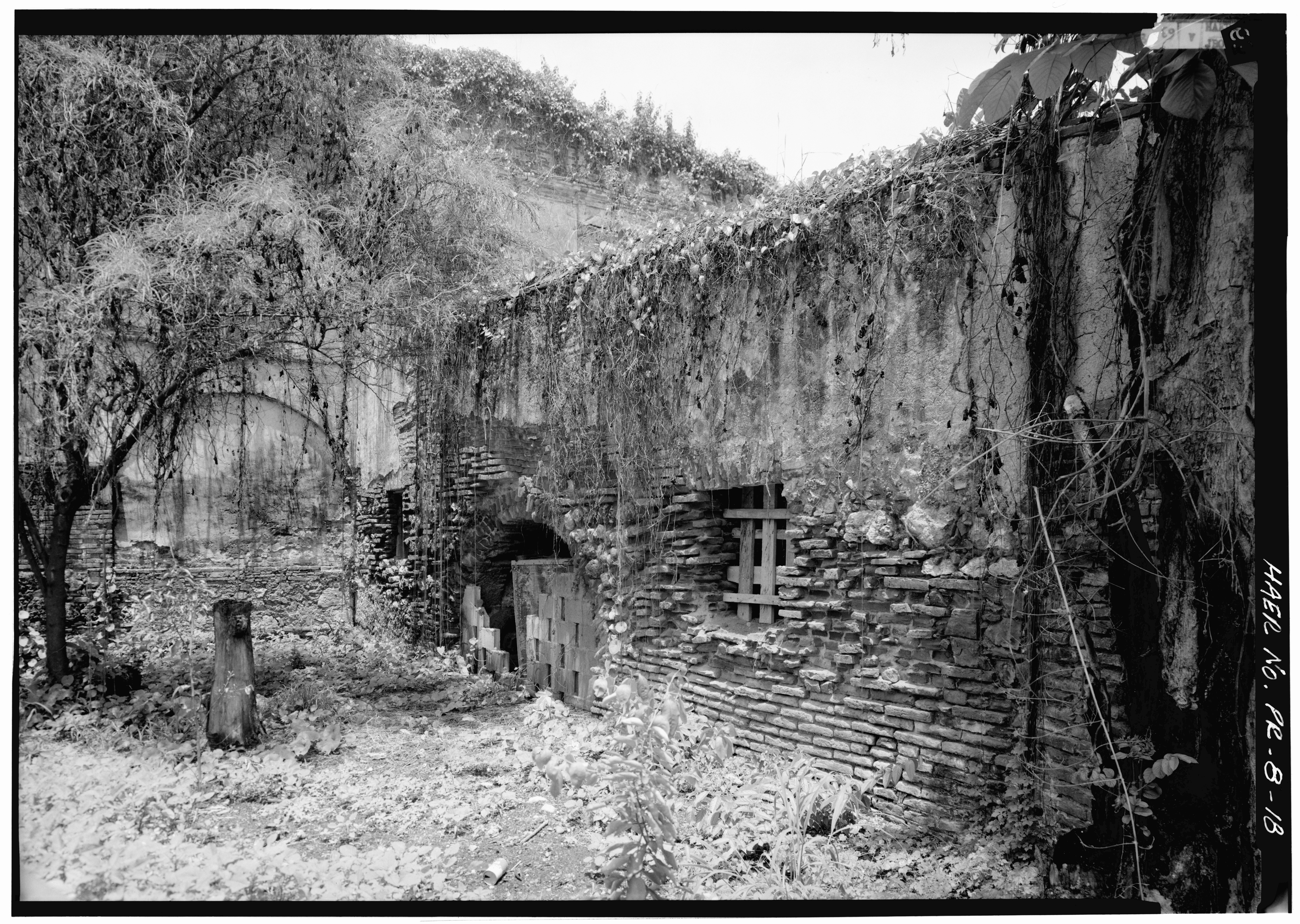

== See also ==
- National Register of Historic Places listings in northern Puerto Rico
