= Puerto Rico Highway 870 =

Highway in Puerto Rico

Highway 870
- Ruta 870

Route information
- Maintained by Puerto Rico DTPW
- Length: 2.1 km (1.3 mi)

Major junctions
- South end: PR-165 in Palo Seco
- North end: Isla de Cabras in Palo Seco

Location
- Country: United States
- Territory: Puerto Rico
- Municipalities: Toa Baja

Highway system
- Roads in Puerto Rico; List
← PR-869	→ PR-873

Puerto Rico Highway 870 (PR-870) is a road located entirely in the municipality of Toa Baja, Puerto Rico. With a length of 2.1 kilometers (1.3 mi), it begins at its intersection with PR-165 and ends at Isla de Cabras, passing through Palo Seco neighborhood.

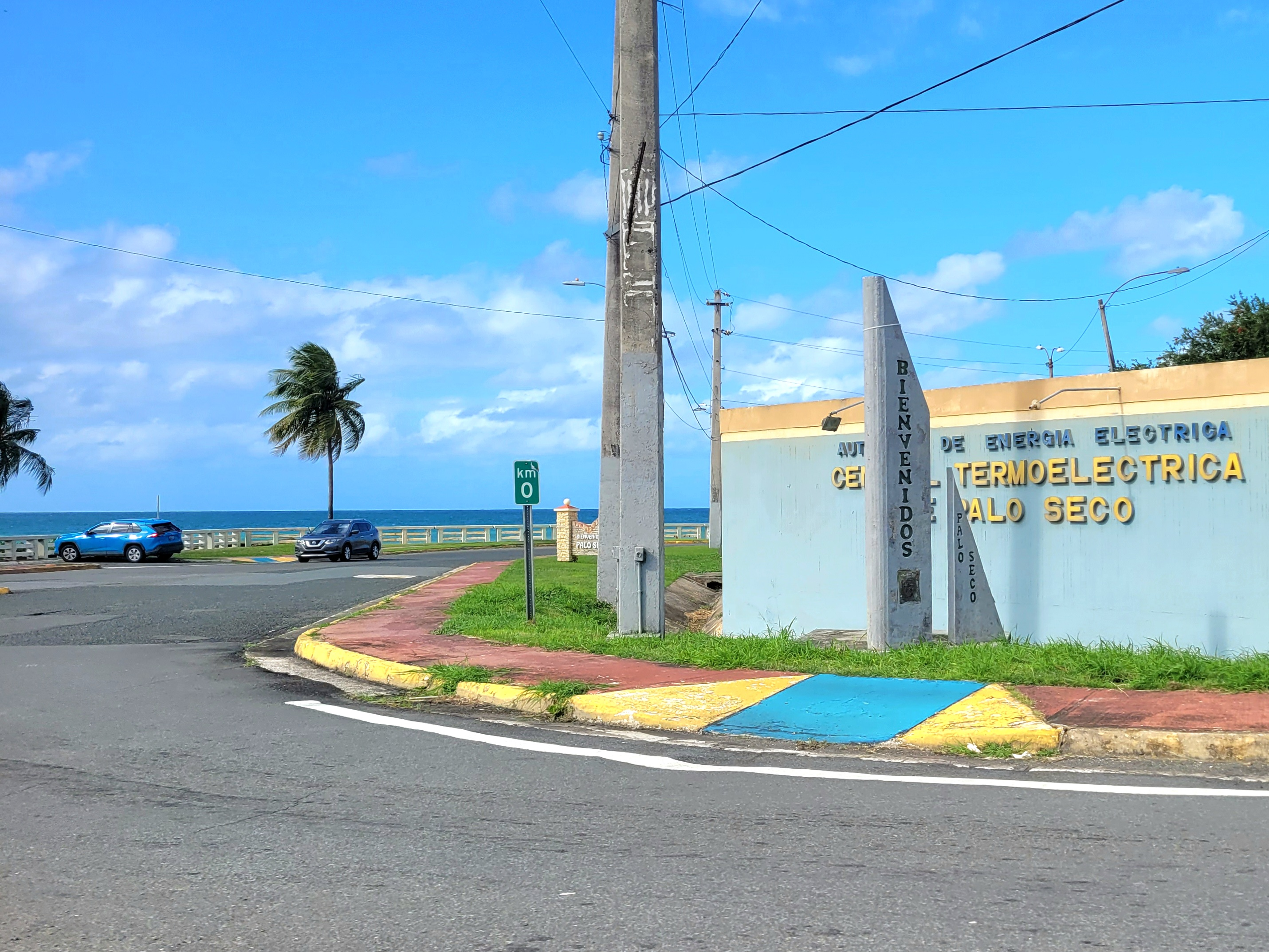
Puerto Rico Highway 870 north in Palo Seco

== Major intersections ==
The entire route is located in Palo Seco, Toa Baja.

km	mi	Destinations	Notes
0.0	0.0	PR-165	Southern terminus of PR-870; access to Cataño and Dorado; unsigned
2.1	1.3	Northern terminus of PR-870 at Isla de Cabras; dead end road	
1.000 mi = 1.609 km; 1.000 km = 0.621 mi
