= Puerto Rico Highway 165 =

Highway in Puerto Rico

Highway 165
- Ruta 165

Route information
- Maintained by Puerto Rico DTPW
- Length: 38.9 km (24.2 mi)
- Existed: 1953–present

Major junctions
- West end: PR-164 in Lomas
- PR-159 in Quebrada Cruz–Quebrada Arenas; PR-2 / PR-693 in Río Lajas; PR-2 in Media Luna; PR-22 in Media Luna; PR-6165 in Mameyal; PR-167 in Sabana Seca; PR-5 in Palmas; PR-24 in Pueblo Viejo; PR-28 in Pueblo Viejo; PR-22 in Pueblo Viejo
- East end: PR-2 / PR-23 in Pueblo Viejo

Location
- Country: United States
- Territory: Puerto Rico
- Municipalities: Naranjito, Toa Alta, Dorado, Toa Baja, Cataño, Guaynabo

Highway system
- Roads in Puerto Rico; List
← PR-164	→ PR-166
← PR-152R	PR-165R	→ PR-187R
← PR-6111	PR-6165	→ PR-6633

Puerto Rico Highway 165 (PR-165) is the road that goes from Naranjito to Guaynabo, passing through Toa Alta, Toa Baja, Dorado, Levittown and Cataño, in northern Puerto Rico. The road extends from PR-164 to PR-2 and PR-23 interchange.

== Route description ==
This highway begins at its junction with PR-164 (road from Naranjito to Corozal) and ends at San Patricio (near Caparra). From Naranjito to Toa Alta it is a rural road. In Toa Baja it becomes a divided highway. In Dorado the road is one lane in each direction and parallel to the northern coast of Puerto Rico. In Levittown, it becomes a divided highway before ending at San Patricio. In Cataño it is a short highway which begins at the Bacardi Distillery and ends at the Federal Prison.

Puerto Rico Highway 165

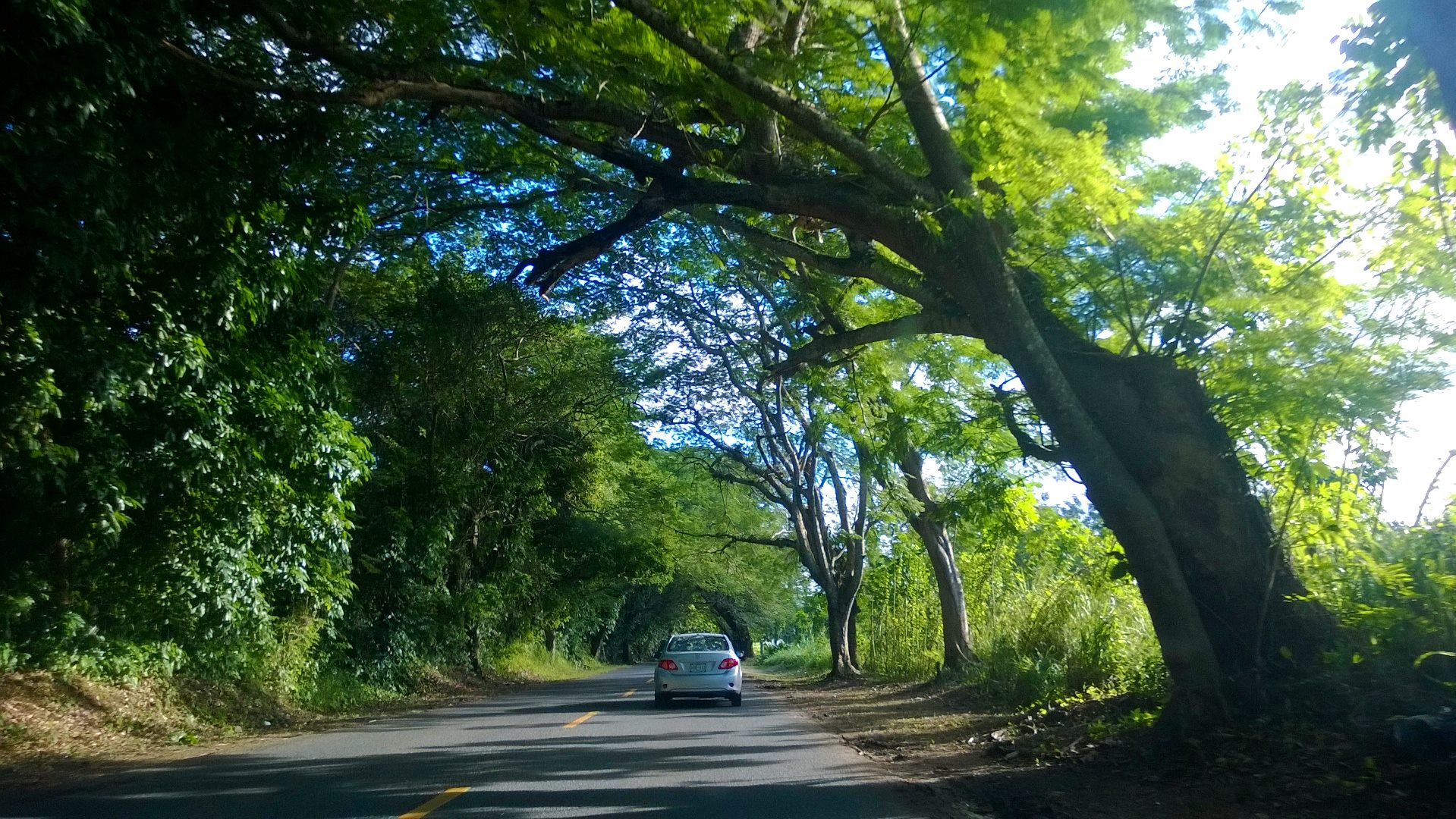
Heading south in Río Lajas, Dorado

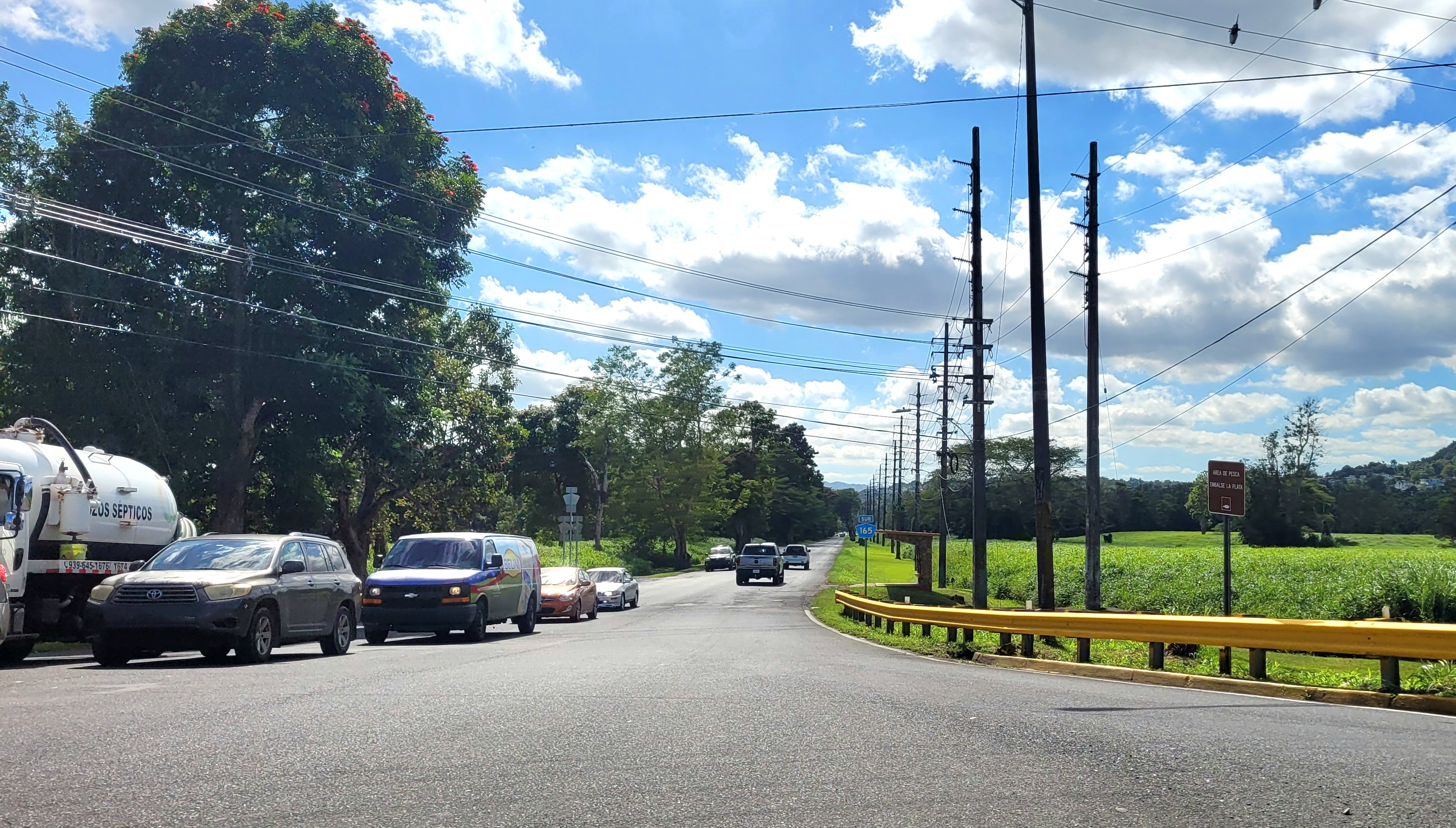
Heading south to Río Lajas and Toa Alta in La Virgencita, Dorado

== Major intersections ==
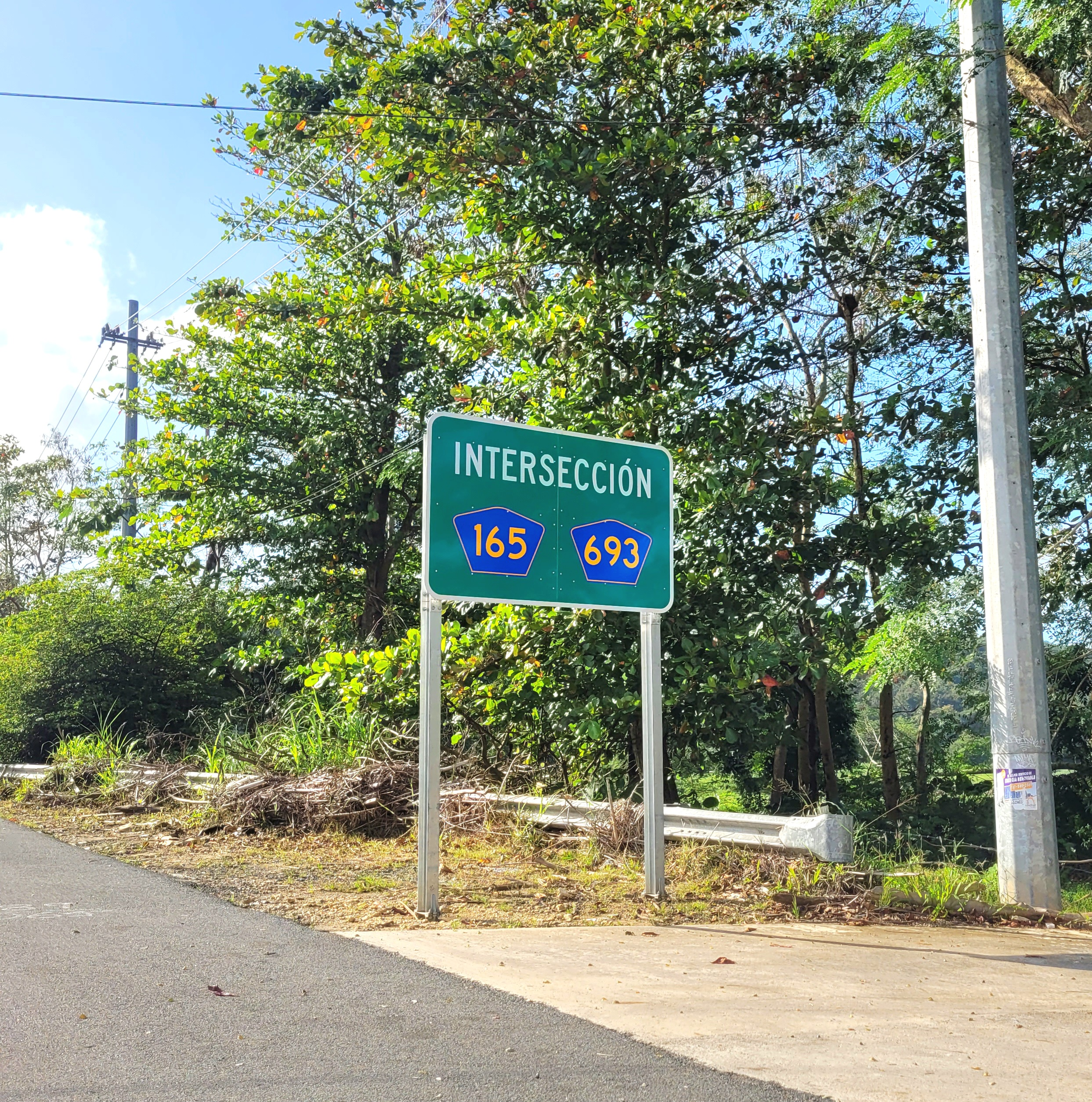
PR-2 west approaching PR-165 and PR-693 intersection between Toa Baja and Dorado

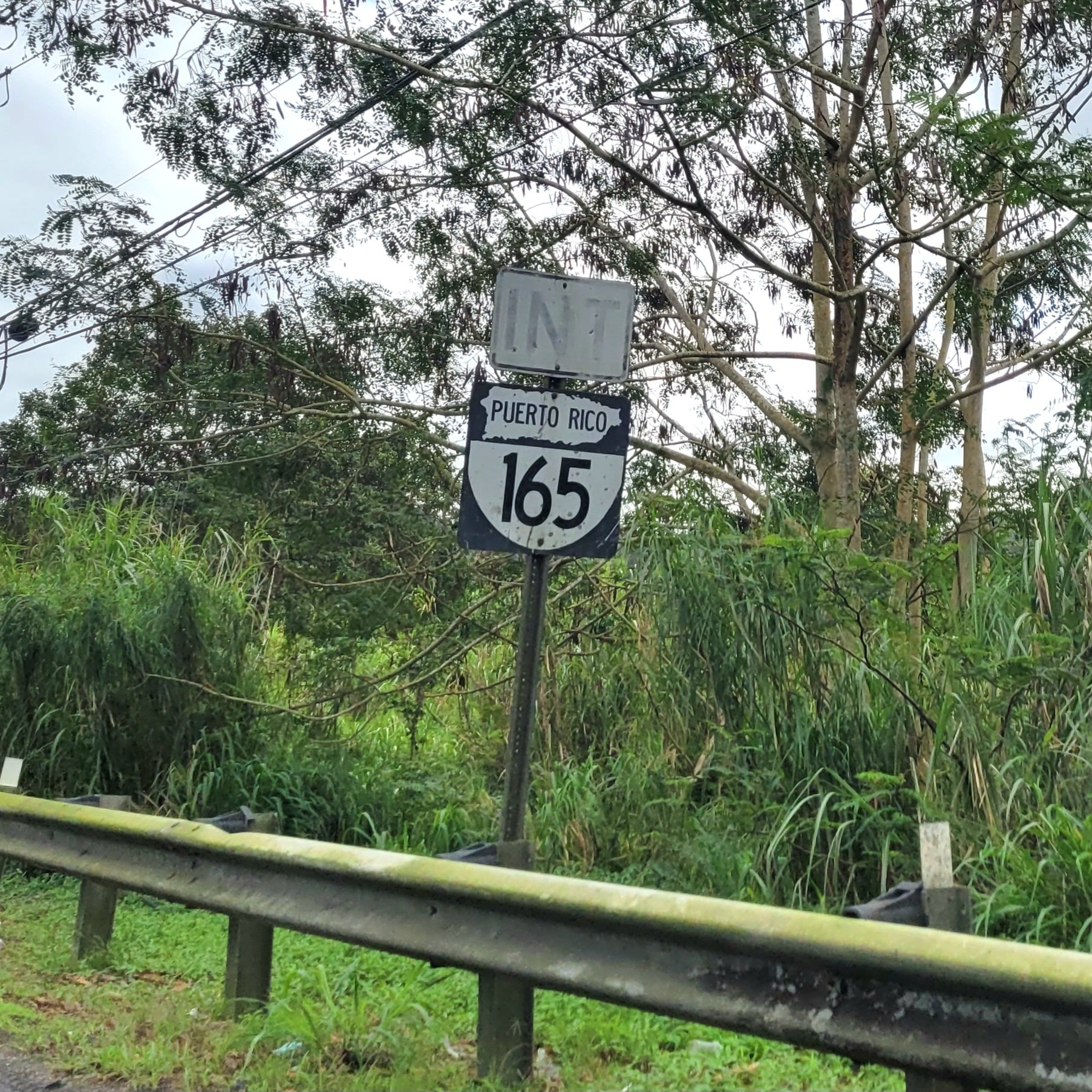
PR-2 east near PR-165 interchange in Media Luna, Toa Baja

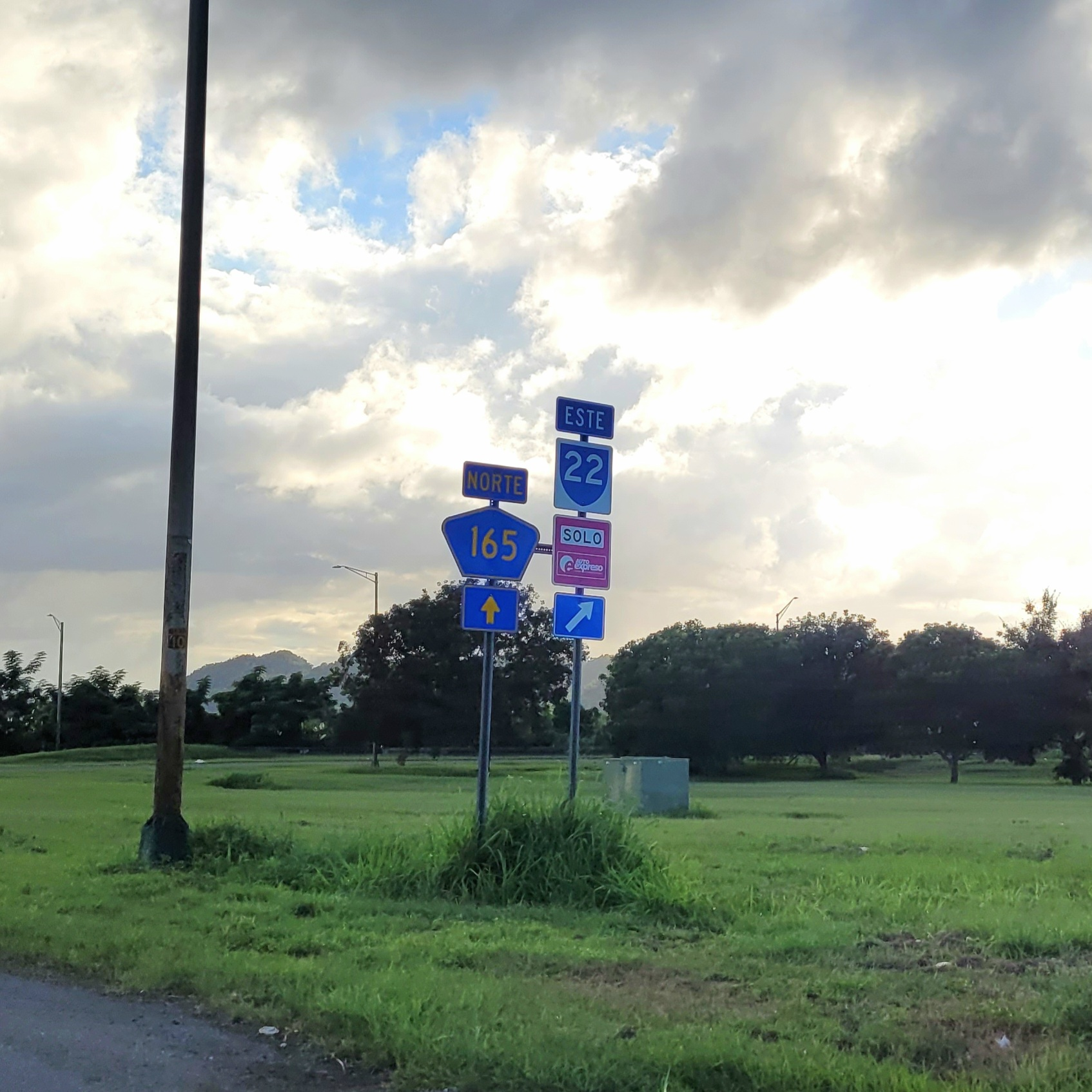
PR-165 south at PR-22 interchange in Media Luna, Toa Baja

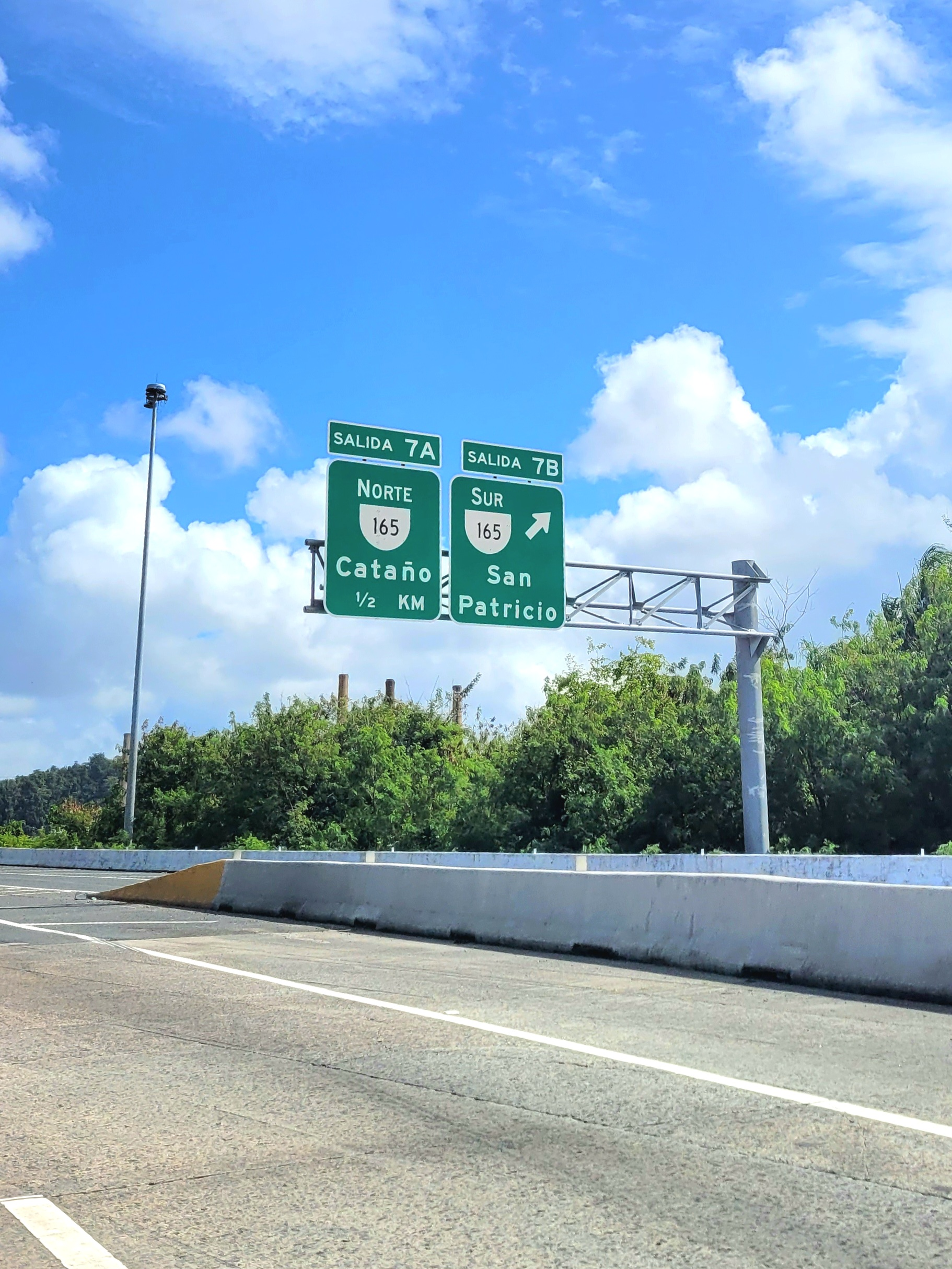
PR-22 east approaching exits 7A-B to PR-165 in Pueblo Viejo, Guaynabo

Municipality	Location	km	mi	Exit	Destinations	Notes
Naranjito	Lomas	0.0	0.0		PR-164 – Naranjito, Corozal	Southern terminus of PR-165
Toa Alta	Quebrada Cruz–Quebrada Arenas line	4.7	2.9		PR-159 west – Morovis, Corozal	
Toa Alta	Quebrada Arenas–Quebrada Cruz– Galateo tripoint	5.8	3.6		PR-824 – Quebrada Cruz	
Toa Alta	Galateo	6.7– 6.8	4.2– 4.2		PR-804 (Avenida Felipe "Pipe" Cedeño Kuilan) – Galateo	
Toa Alta	Contorno–Galateo line	8.2	5.1		PR-823 – Quebrada Arenas	Access to Río Lajas
Toa Alta	Contorno	10.6	6.6		PR-8861 (Desvío Sargento Mayor José A. "Pepe" Ramírez) – Toa Alta	
Toa Alta	Contorno	10.7– 10.8	6.6– 6.7		PR-165R (Calle Luis Muñoz Rivera) – Toa Alta	
Toa Alta	Contorno	11.4– 11.5	7.1– 7.1		PR-861 (Calle Antonio R. Barceló) – Toa Alta	Roundabout
Dorado	Río Lajas	11.8	7.3		PR-8865 – Toa Baja, San José	
Dorado	Río Lajas	13.6 23.5 (Note: Kilometer markers represent the distance along PR-2 rather than PR-165.)	8.5 14.6		PR-2 west / PR-693 north (Avenida Édgar Martínez Salgado) – Vega Alta, Dorado	Western terminus of PR-2 concurrency
Río de la Plata		23.4	14.5	Puente de la Virgencita		
Toa Baja	Media Luna	22.9	14.2		PR-8865 (Carretera San José) – Toa Alta, San José	
Toa Baja	Media Luna	22.6 13.7	14.0 8.5	14	PR-2 east – Bayamón	Eastern terminus of PR-2 concurrency; trumpet interchange
Toa Baja	Media Luna	14.3– 14.7	8.9– 9.1	15	PR-22 (Autopista José de Diego) – Arecibo, Mayagüez, Bayamón, San Juan	PR-22 exits 22, 22A and 22B; partial cloverleaf interchange; southbound exits signed as 15A and 15B; no exit number northbound
Toa Baja	Media Luna	15.0	9.3		PR-854 / PR-865 – Toa Baja, Campanilla	
Toa Baja	Media Luna–Sabana Seca line	17.4	10.8		PR-867 – Toa Baja, Sabana Seca	
Dorado	Mameyal	18.6	11.6		PR-6165 west (Calle Méndez Vigo) – Dorado	
Toa Baja	Sabana Seca	26.7– 26.8	16.6– 16.7		PR-868 – Levittown	
Toa Baja	Sabana Seca	29.6– 29.7	18.4– 18.5		PR-167 south (Avenida Ramón Luis Rivera) – Bayamón, Comerío	
Toa Baja	Palo Seco	31.1– 31.2	19.3– 19.4		PR-870 – Palo Seco, Isla de Cabras	
Cataño	Palmas	31.7– 31.8	19.7– 19.8		PR-869 (Carretera Industrial) – Palmas	
Cataño	Palmas	32.3– 32.4	20.1– 20.1		PR-888 (Avenida Las Nereidas) – Cataño	
Cataño	Palmas	34.5– 35.1	21.4– 21.8	—	PR-5 (Avenida José Celso Barbosa) – Bayamón, Cataño	Diamond interchange
Guaynabo	Pueblo Viejo	36.5– 36.9	22.7– 22.9	—	PR-24 (Avenida Juan Ponce de León) – Cataño, Amelia	
Guaynabo	Pueblo Viejo	37.1– 37.2	23.1– 23.1		PR-28 (Avenida Francisco José de Goya) – Bayamón, Zona Portuaria	
Guaynabo	Pueblo Viejo	37.4– 37.9	23.2– 23.5		PR-22 (Autopista José de Diego) – Bayamón, Arecibo, San Juan, Carolina	PR-22 exits 7A and 7B; partial cloverleaf interchange
Guaynabo	Pueblo Viejo	38.9	24.2		PR-2 (Expreso John F. Kennedy) to PR-20 (Expreso Rafael Martínez Nadal) – Guaynabo, Bayamón, San Juan	Northern terminus of PR-165 and eastern terminus of PR-23
Guaynabo	Pueblo Viejo	38.9	24.2		PR-23 east (Avenida Franklin Delano Roosevelt)	Continuation beyond PR-2
1.000 mi = 1.609 km; 1.000 km = 0.621 mi: Concurrency terminus

== Related routes ==
Currently, Puerto Rico Highway 165 has two branches along its route. One of them is located in Toa Alta and the other is in Dorado.

=== Puerto Rico Highway 165R ===
Highway 165R
- Location: Toa Alta
- Length: 0.65 km (0.40 mi; 2,100 ft)

Puerto Rico Highway 165R (Spanish: Carretera Ramal 165, abbreviated Ramal PR-165 or PR-165R) is the road that goes to downtown Toa Alta, Puerto Rico. This road can be seen as the Business 165, since this road was the PR-165 through the area from the town center. The entire route is located in Toa Alta.

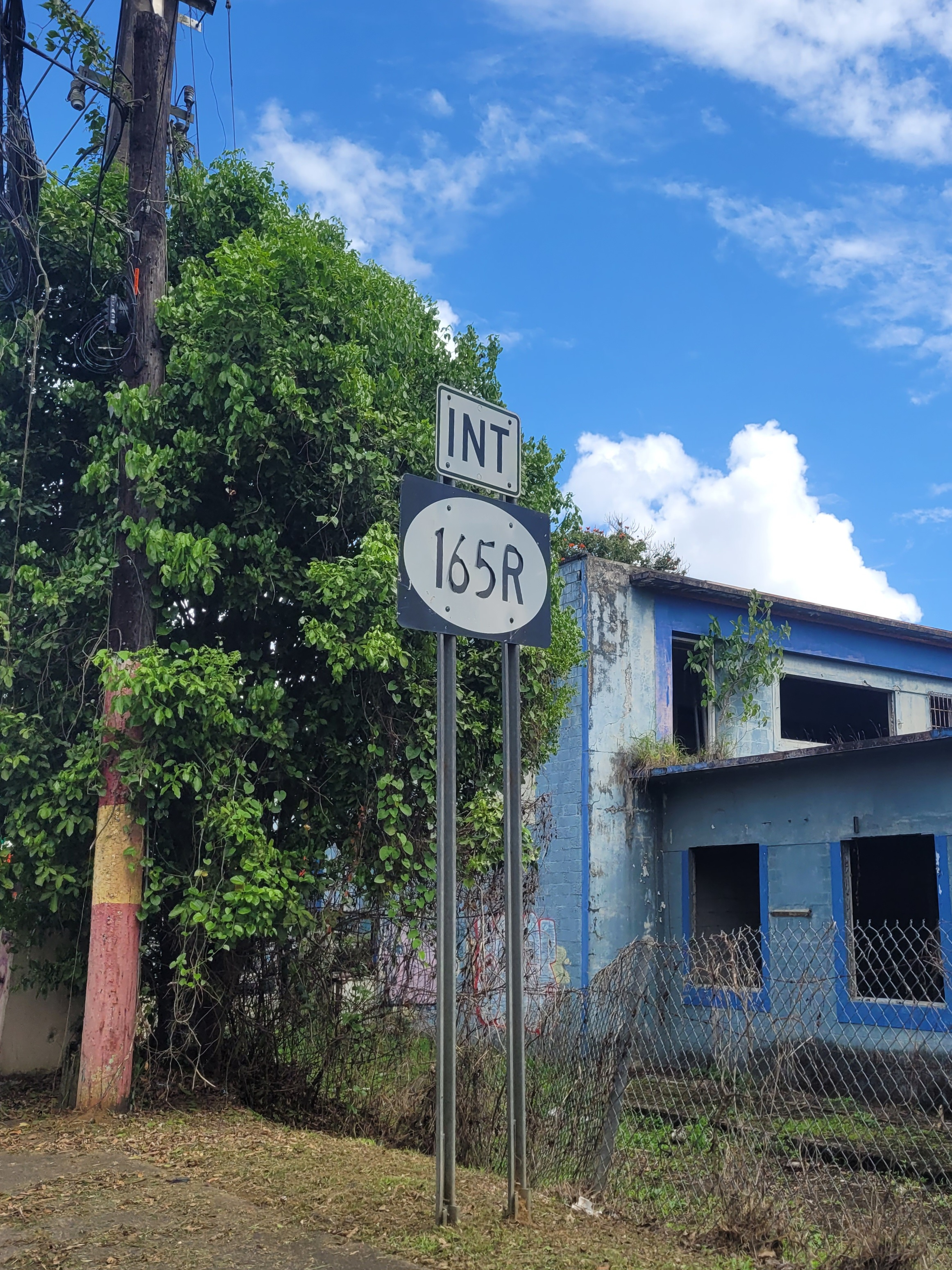
PR-165 north near PR-165R intersection in Contorno barrio

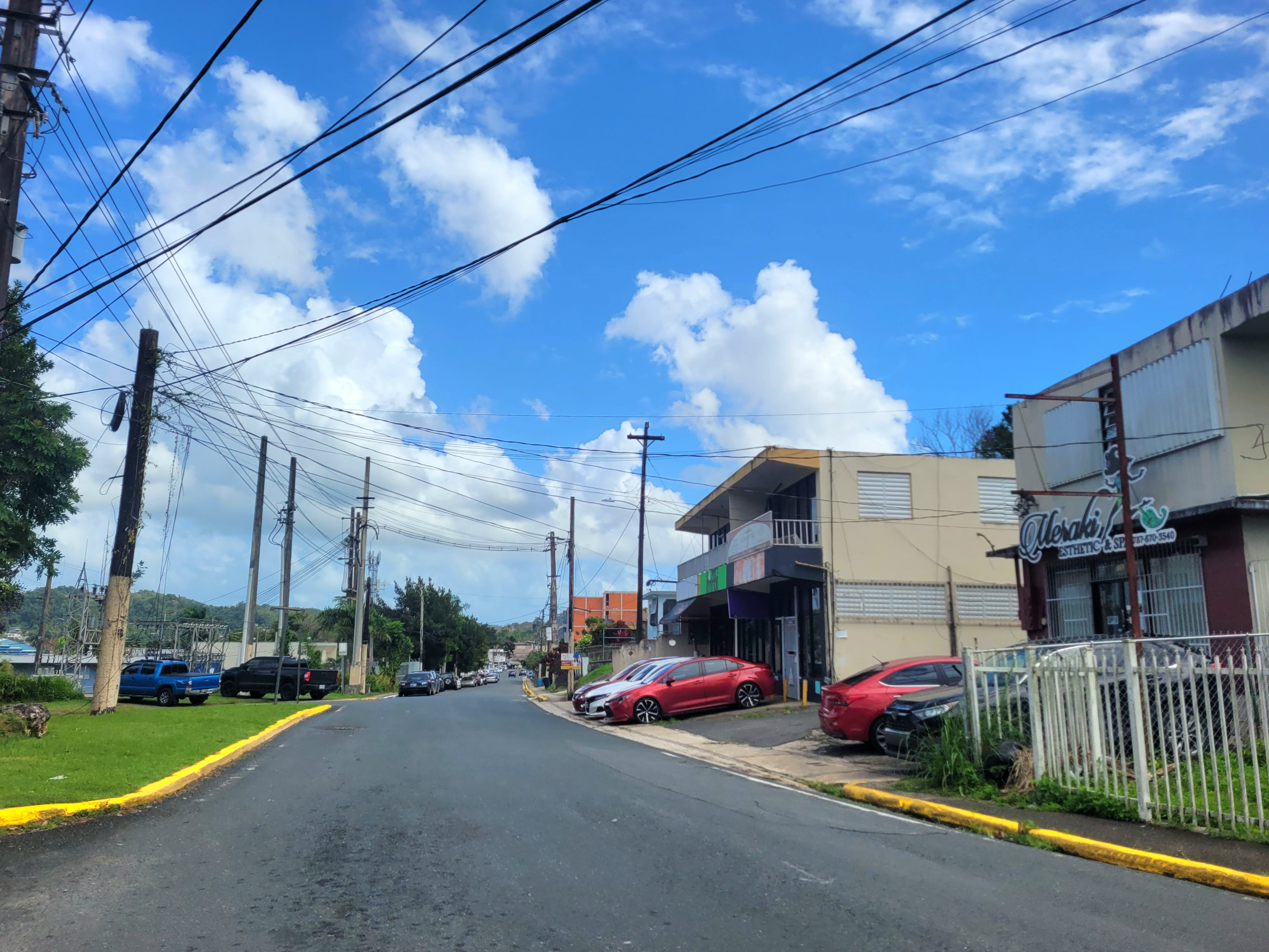
PR-165R north in Contorno barrio

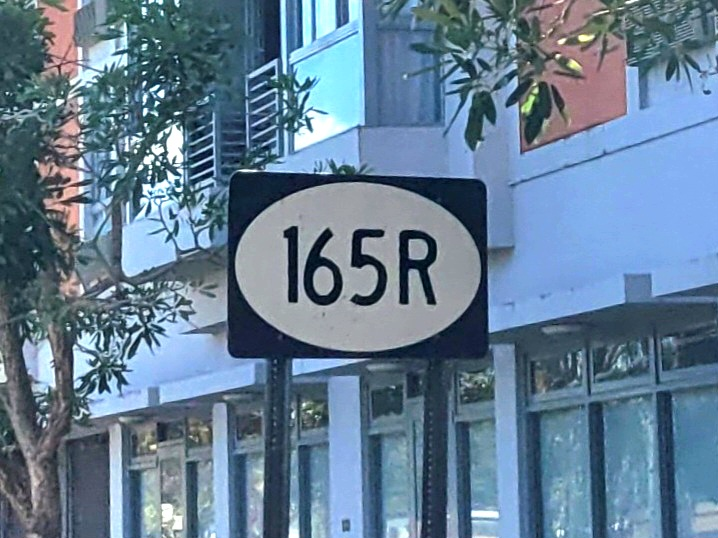
PR-165R north entering downtown Toa Alta

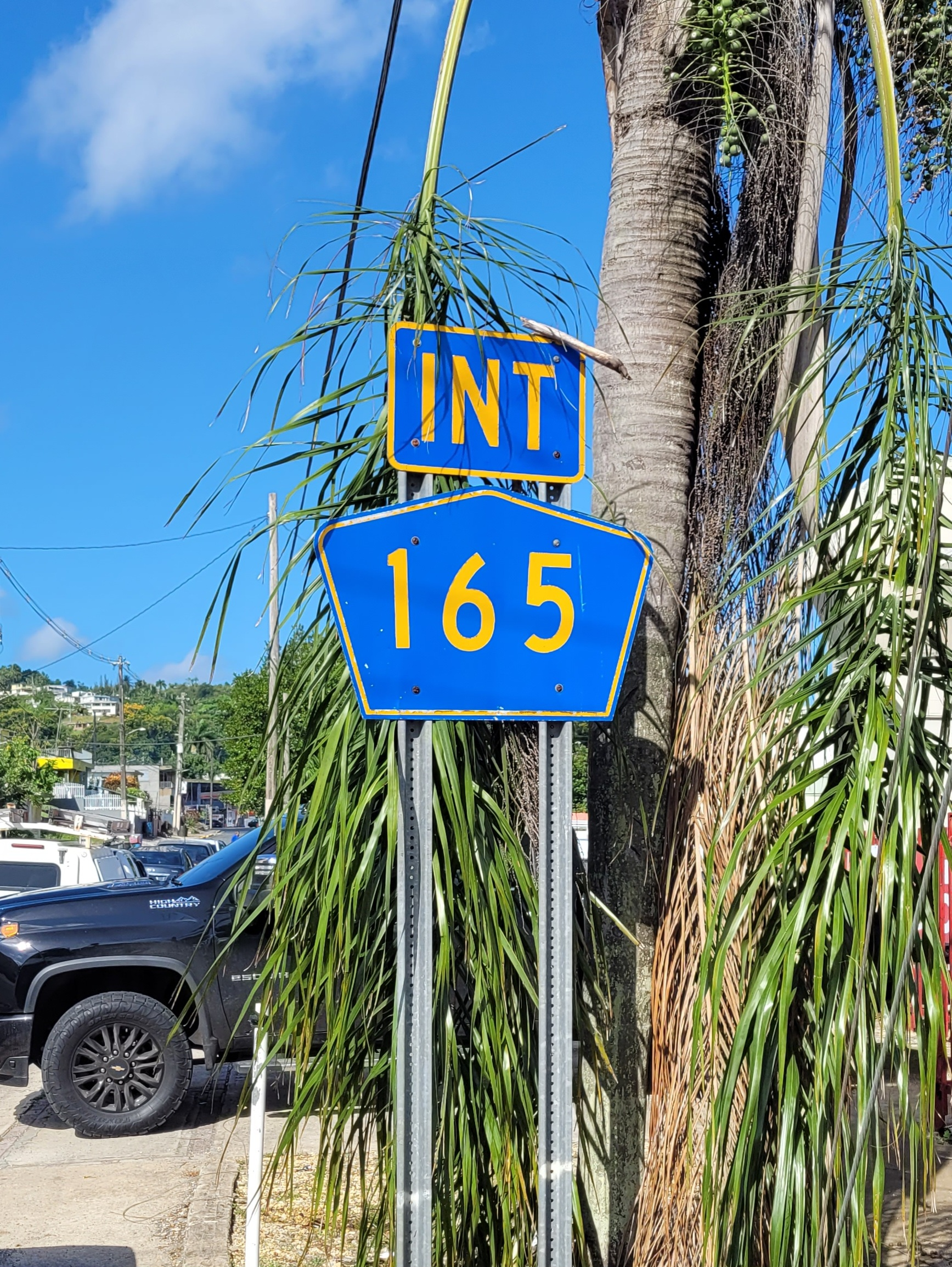
PR-165R south approaching PR-165 junction in Contorno barrio

Location	km	mi	Destinations	Notes
Contorno	0.00	0.00	PR-165 – Corozal	Southern terminus of PR-165R; access to Naranjito, Dorado and Toa Baja
Toa Alta barrio-pueblo	0.65	0.40	PR-861	Northern terminus of PR-165R; unsigned
1.000 mi = 1.609 km; 1.000 km = 0.621 mi

=== Puerto Rico Highway 6165 ===
Highway 6165
- Location: Dorado
- Length: 0.8 km (0.50 mi; 2,600 ft)

Puerto Rico Highway 6165 (PR-6165) is the road that goes to downtown Dorado, Puerto Rico from PR-165. This road can be seen as the Business spur 165 because it connects PR-165 with PR-693 in downtown area. The entire route is located in Dorado.

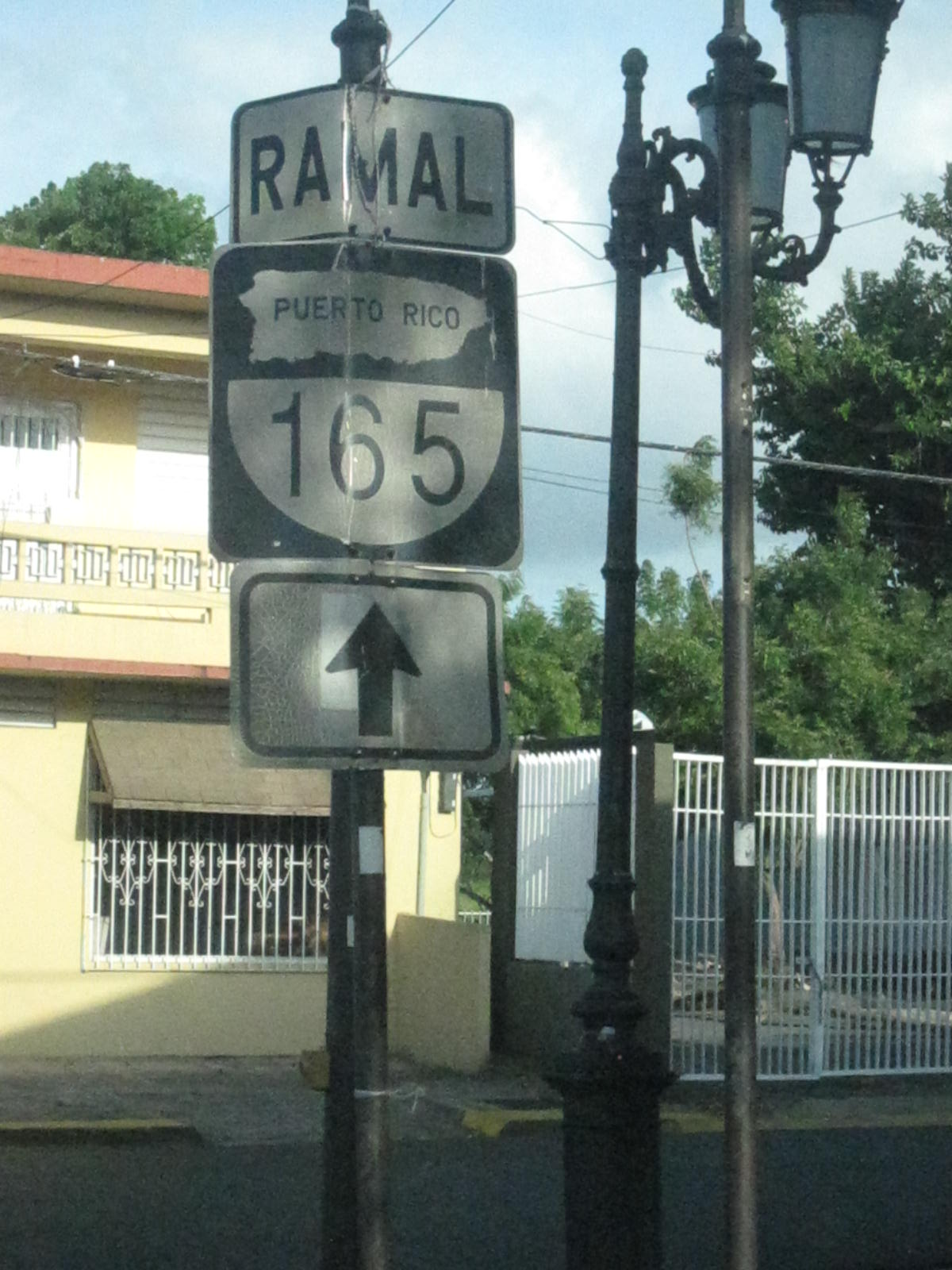
Old sign for PR-165R in Dorado

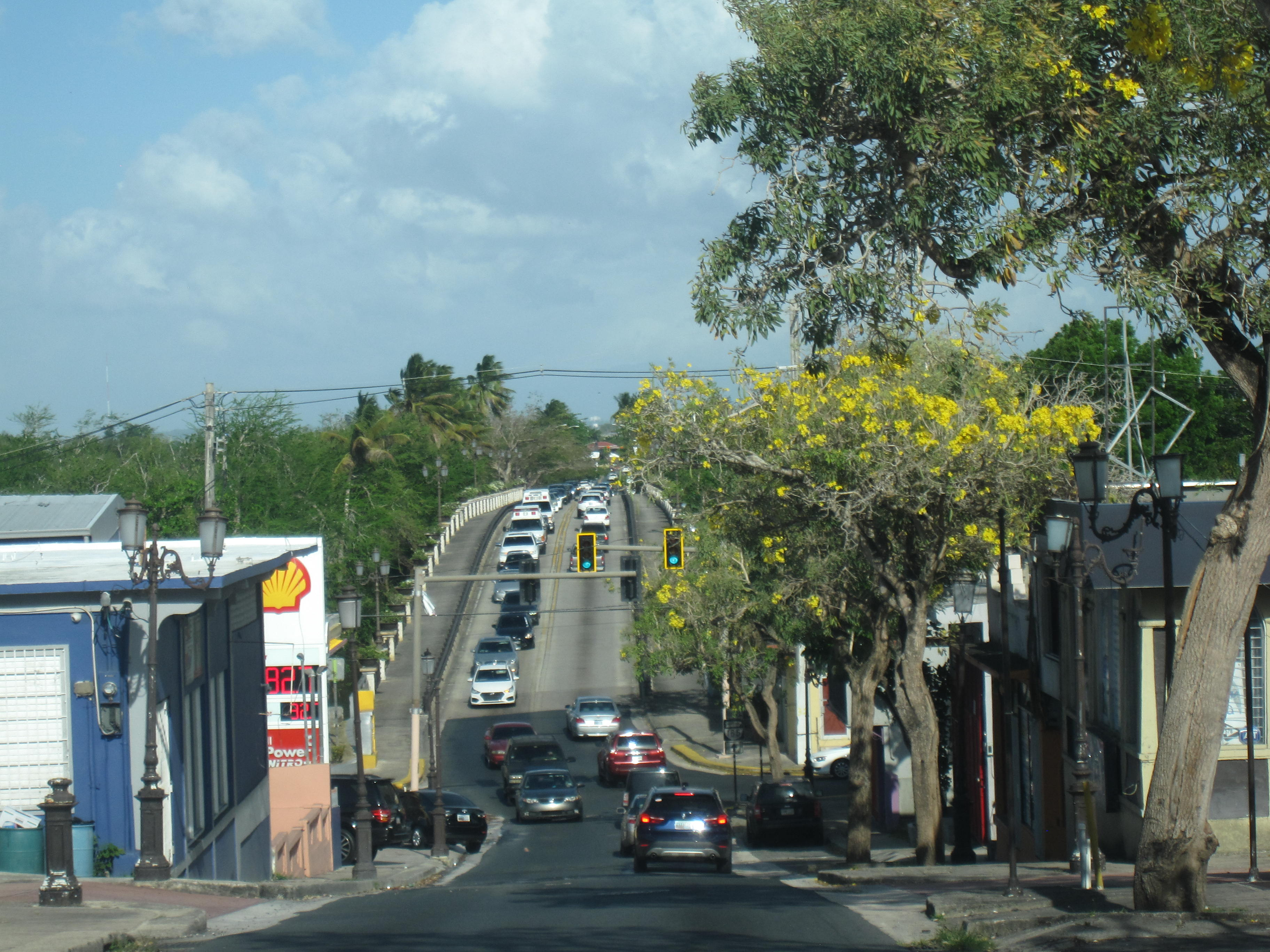
Bridge on Calle Méndez Vigo (PR-6165) in Dorado

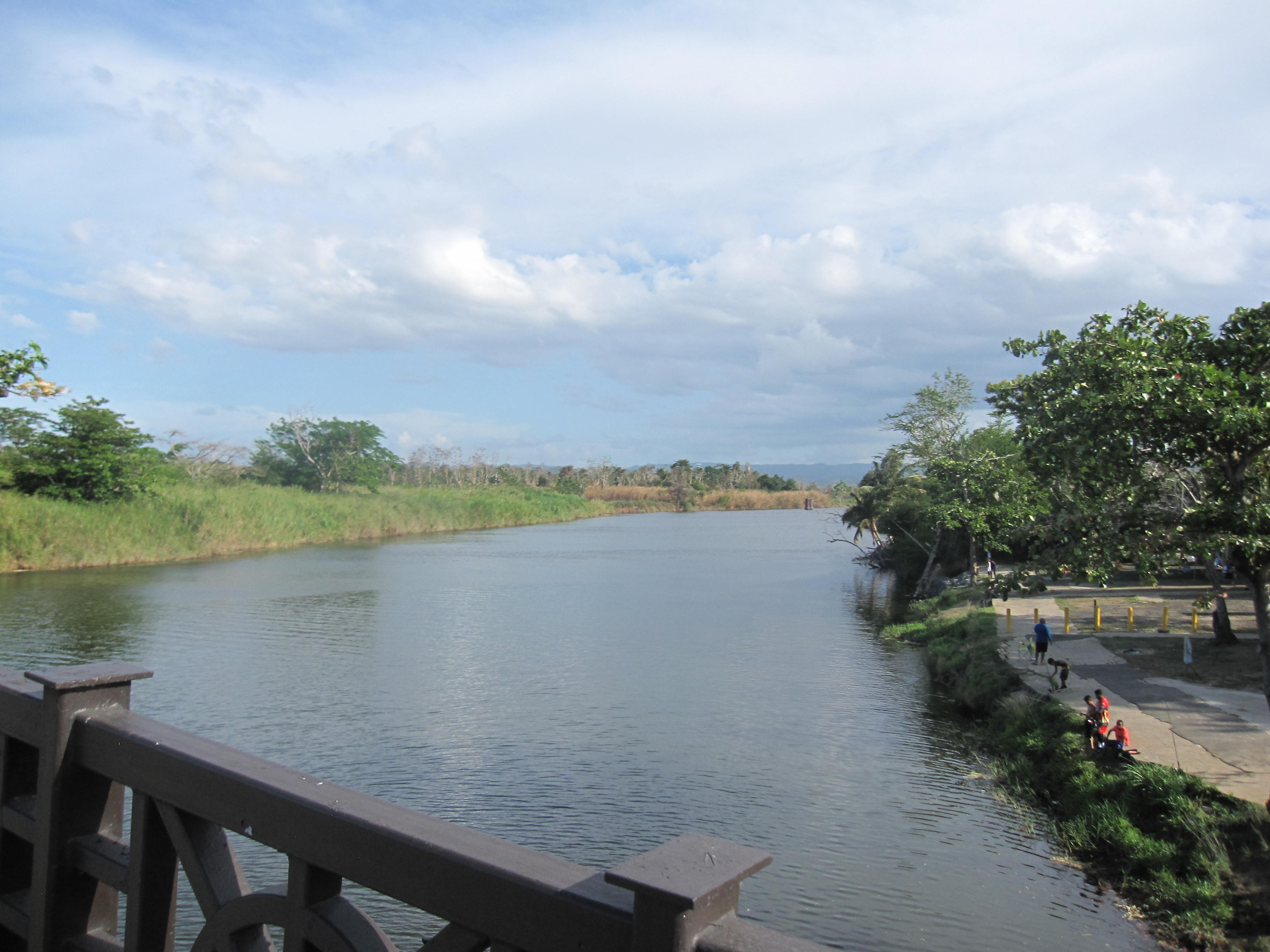
View of the La Plata River from bridge on Calle Méndez Vigo (PR-6165)

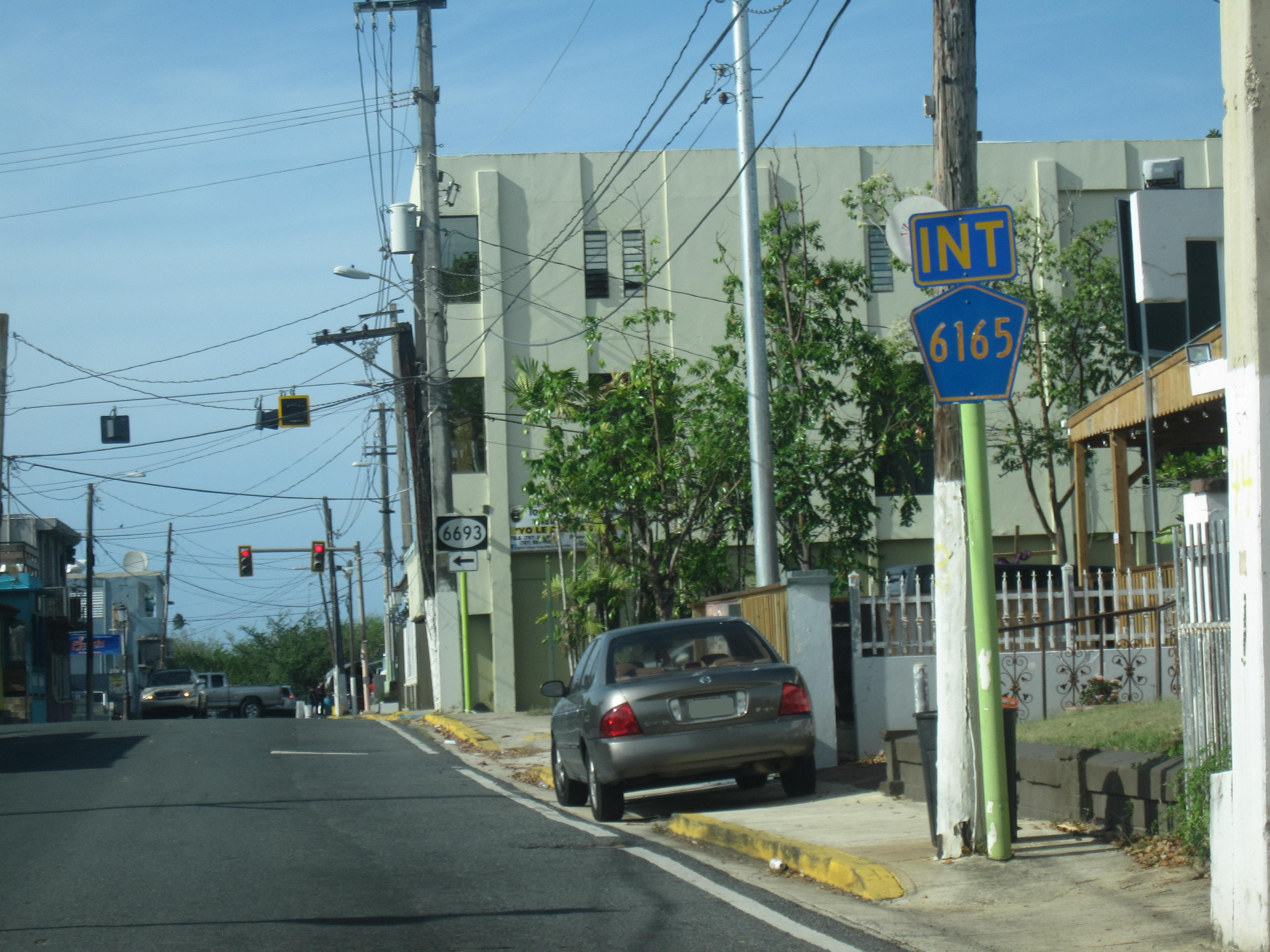
Sign for PR-6165 intersection in Dorado

Location	km	mi	Destinations	Notes
Dorado barrio-pueblo	0.0	0.0	PR-693 – Dorado Centro	Western terminus of PR-6165; access to Hyatt Residence Club Dorado
Mameyal	0.5	0.31	PR-854 – Toa Baja Centro	Northern terminus of PR-854
Mameyal	0.8	0.50	PR-165	Eastern terminus of PR-6165; access to San Juan
1.000 mi = 1.609 km; 1.000 km = 0.621 mi

== See also ==
- 1953 Puerto Rico highway renumbering
