= Palo Seco, Toa Baja, Puerto Rico =

Barrio of Puerto Rico

Palo Seco
- Barrio
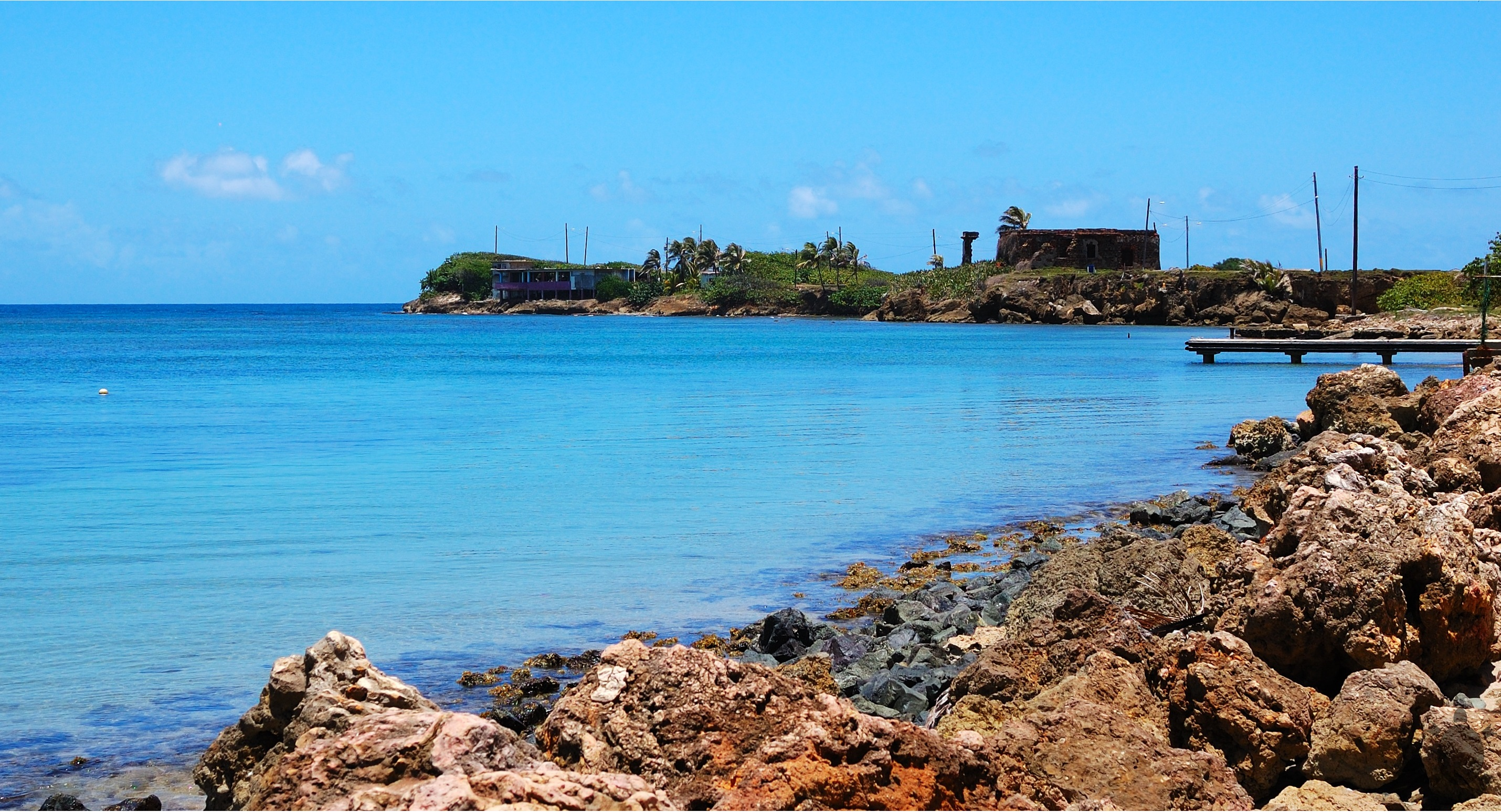
- View of Old San Juan from Palo Seco

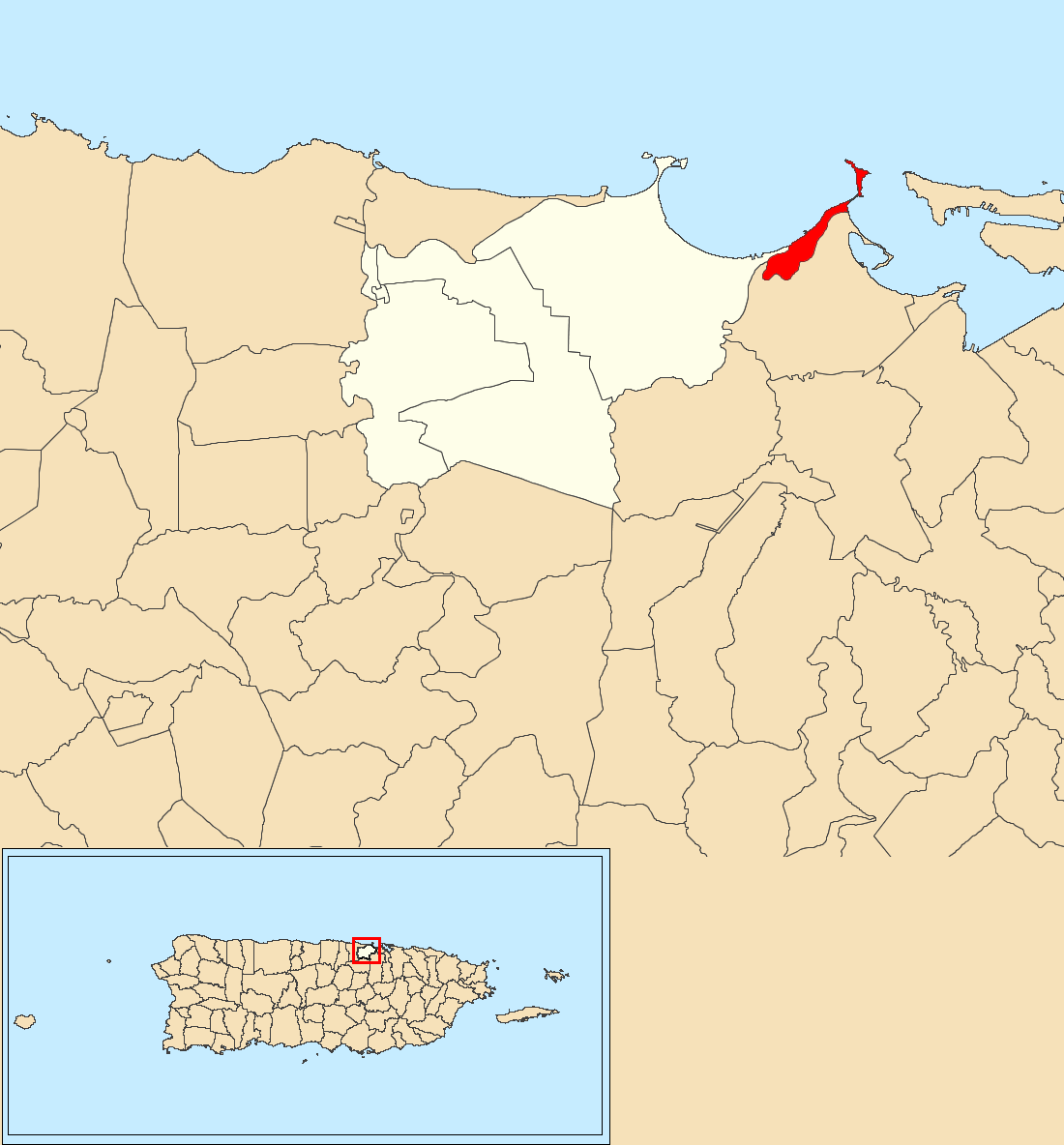
- Location of Palo Seco within the municipality of Toa Baja shown in red

- Location of Puerto Rico
- Coordinates: 18°28′12″N 66°08′12″W
- Commonwealth: Puerto Rico
- Municipality: Toa Baja

Area
  - Total: 1.60 sq mi (4.1 km^{2})
  - Land: 0.49 sq mi (1.3 km^{2})
  - Water: 1.11 sq mi (2.9 km^{2})
- Elevation: 0 ft (0 m)

Population (2010)
  - Total: 288
  - Density: 587.8/sq mi (227.0/km^{2})
- Source: 2010 Census
- Time zone: UTC−4 (AST)

Palo Seco is a barrio in the municipality of Toa Baja, Puerto Rico. Its population in 2010 was 288.

== Palo Seco power plant ==
One of the main power plants supplying power to Puerto Rico is the Palo Seco fuel oil power plant located in Palo Seco. Before Hurricane Irma and Hurricane Maria struck Puerto Rico in September 2017, the Palo Seco plant was slated to close.

Historical population
Census	Pop.	Note	%±
1910	692		—
1920	816		17.9%
1930	825		1.1%
1940	904		9.6%
1950	840		−7.1%
1960	709		−15.6%
1970	489		−31.0%
1980	439		−10.2%
1990	385		−12.3%
2000	325		−15.6%
2010	288		−11.4%
U.S. Decennial Census; 1910-1930; 1930-1950 1980-2000 2010

== Gallery ==
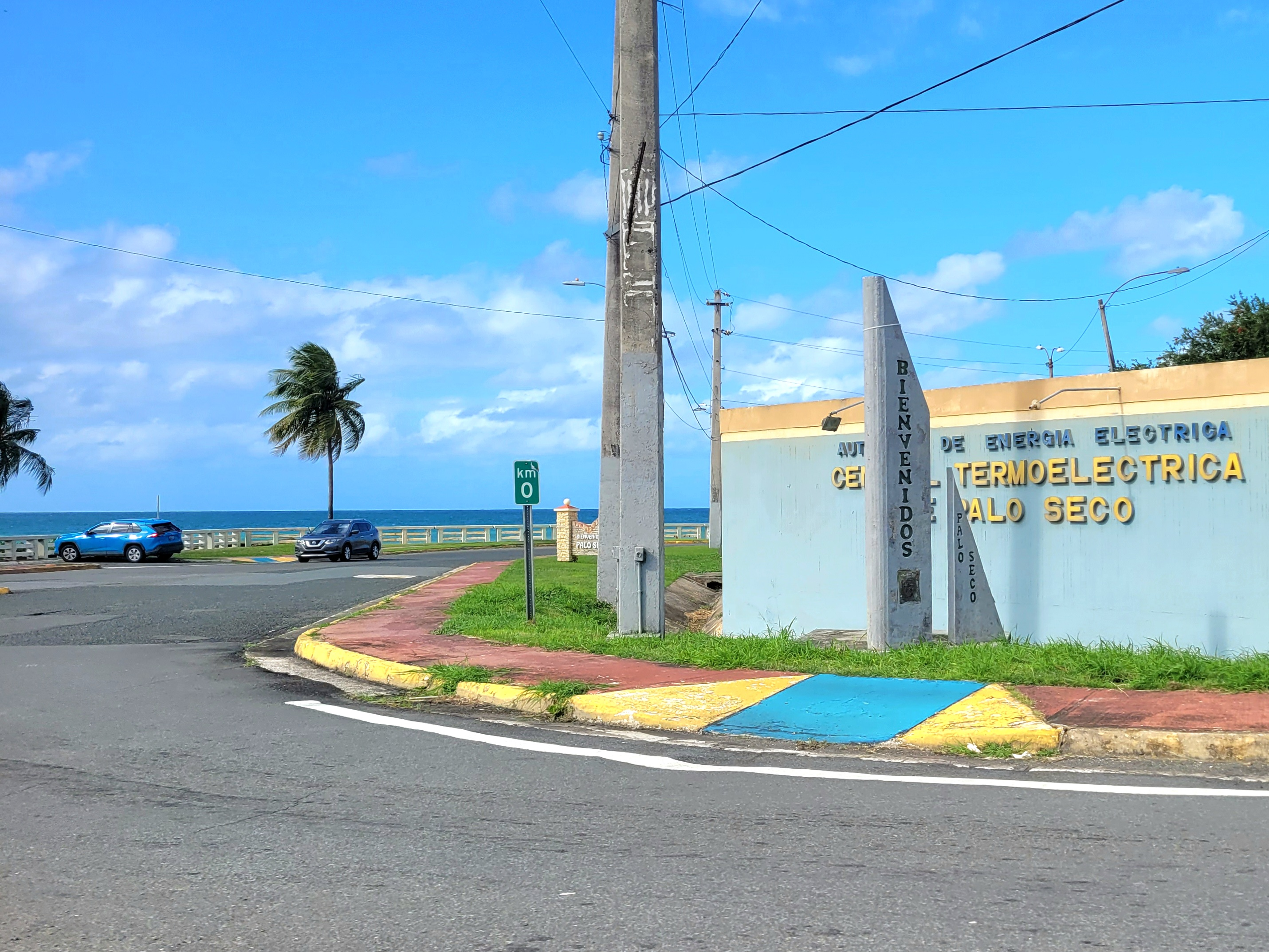
PR-870 in Palo Seco

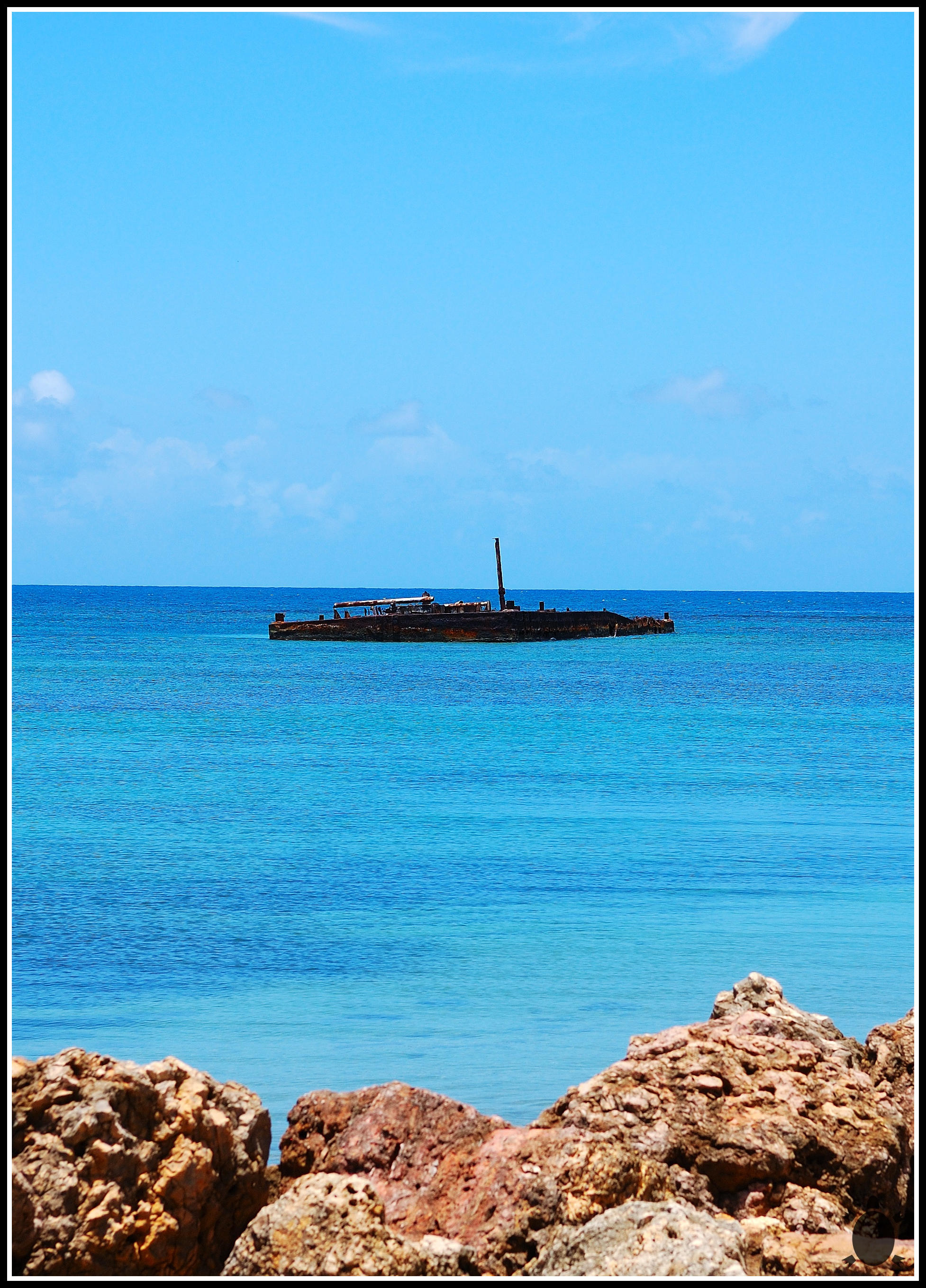
Sunken ship off the coast of Palo Seco

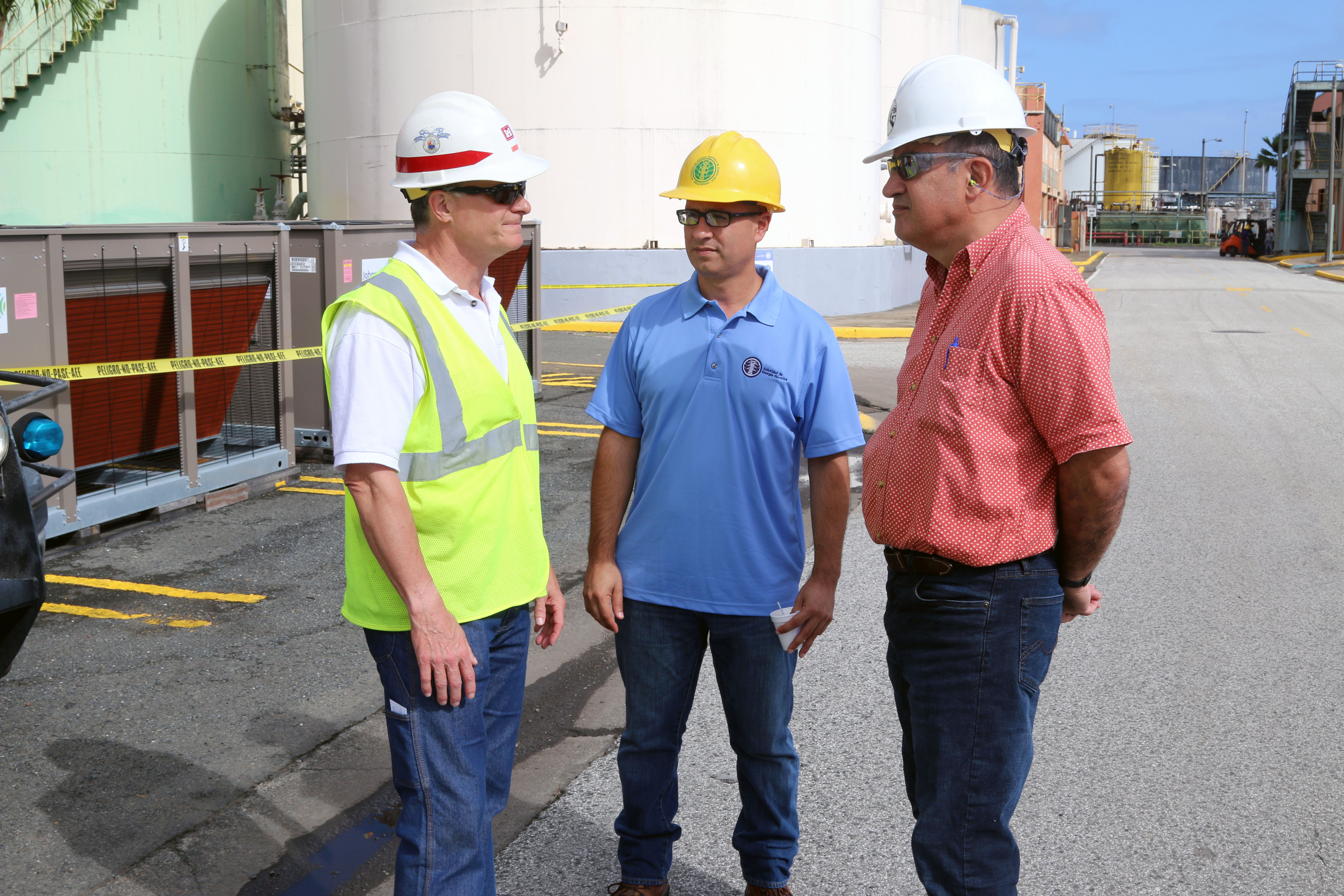
At the Palo Seco Power Plant after 2 hurricanes struck Puerto Rico in 2017

== See also ==
- List of communities in Puerto Rico
- List of barrios and sectors of Toa Baja, Puerto Rico
