= Contorno, Toa Alta, Puerto Rico =

Barrio of Puerto Rico

Contorno
- Barrio
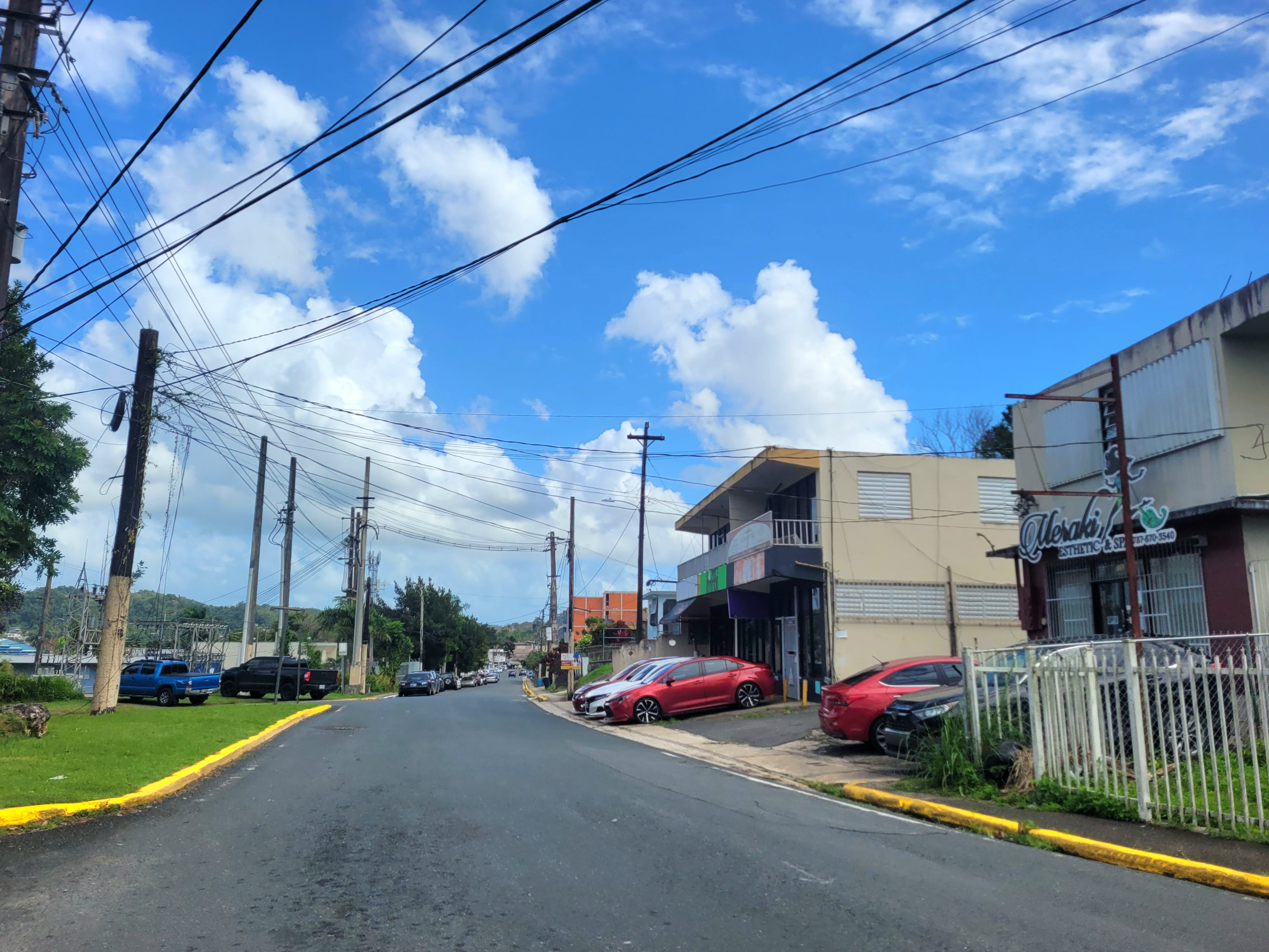
- Puerto Rico Highway 165R in Contorno

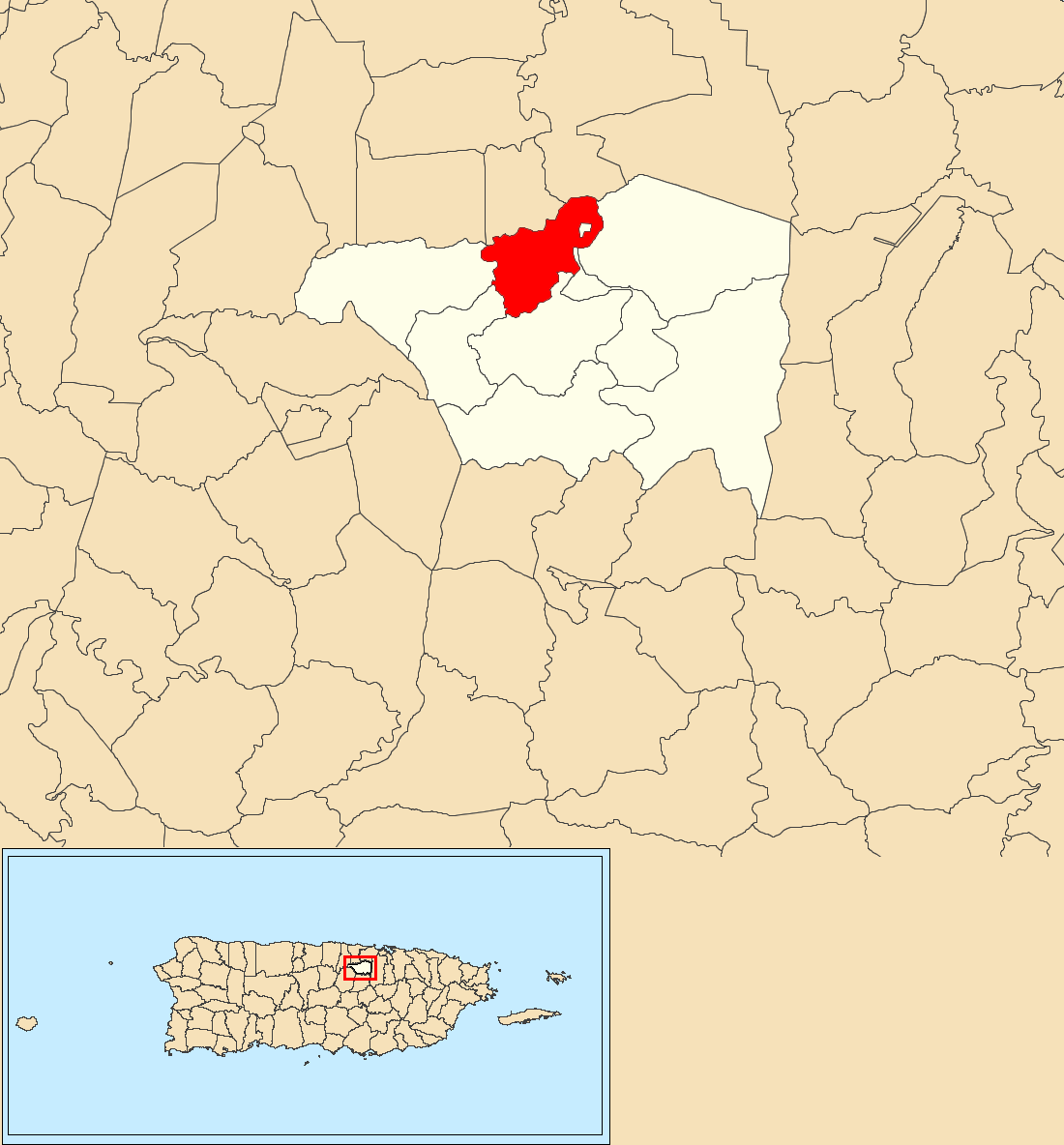
- Location of Contorno within the municipality of Toa Alta shown in red

- Location of Puerto Rico
- Coordinates: 18°22′55″N 66°15′51″W
- Commonwealth: Puerto Rico
- Municipality: Toa Alta

Area
  - Total: 1.95 sq mi (5.1 km^{2})
  - Land: 1.93 sq mi (5.0 km^{2})
  - Water: 0.02 sq mi (0.052 km^{2})
- Elevation: 318 ft (97 m)

Population (2010)
  - Total: 4,737
  - Density: 2,454.4/sq mi (947.6/km^{2})
- Source: 2010 Census
- Time zone: UTC−4 (AST)

Contorno is a barrio in the municipality of Toa Alta, Puerto Rico. Its population in 2010 was 4,737.

Historical population
| Census | Pop. | Note | %± |
|---|---|---|---|
| 1900 | 653 | | — |
| 1910 | 818 | | 25.3% |
| 1920 | 992 | | 21.3% |
| 1930 | 1,336 | | 34.7% |
| 1940 | 1,630 | | 22.0% |
| 1950 | 1,486 | | −8.8% |
| 1960 | 2,289 | | 54.0% |
| 1970 | 0 | | −100.0% |
| 1980 | 4,896 | | — |
| 1990 | 5,254 | | 7.3% |
| 2000 | 5,085 | | −3.2% |
| 2010 | 4,737 | | −6.8% |
U.S. Decennial Census; 1899 (shown as 1900) 1910-1930; 1930-1950 1980-2000 2010

== History ==
Contorno was in Spain's gazetteers until Puerto Rico was ceded by Spain in the aftermath of the Spanish–American War under the terms of the Treaty of Paris of 1898 and became an unincorporated territory of the United States. In 1899, the United States Department of War conducted a census of Puerto Rico finding that the population of Contorno barrio was 653.

== Sectors ==
Barrios (which are, in contemporary times, roughly comparable to minor civil divisions) in turn are further subdivided into smaller local populated place areas/units called sectores (sectors in English). The types of sectores may vary, from normally sector to urbanización to reparto to barriada to residencial, among others.

The following sectors are in Contorno barrio:

Apartamentos Palacio Dorado, Reparto Sherly, Residencial Jardines de San Fernando, Sector Cielito (Carretera 165), Sector Cielo Mar, Sector El Winche, Sector Gury, Sector Rabo del Buey, Sector Santos, Urbanización Mansiones del Toa, Urbanización Quintas Don Juan (Highland Estates), Urbanización San Fernando, and Urbanización Town Hills.

== Gallery ==
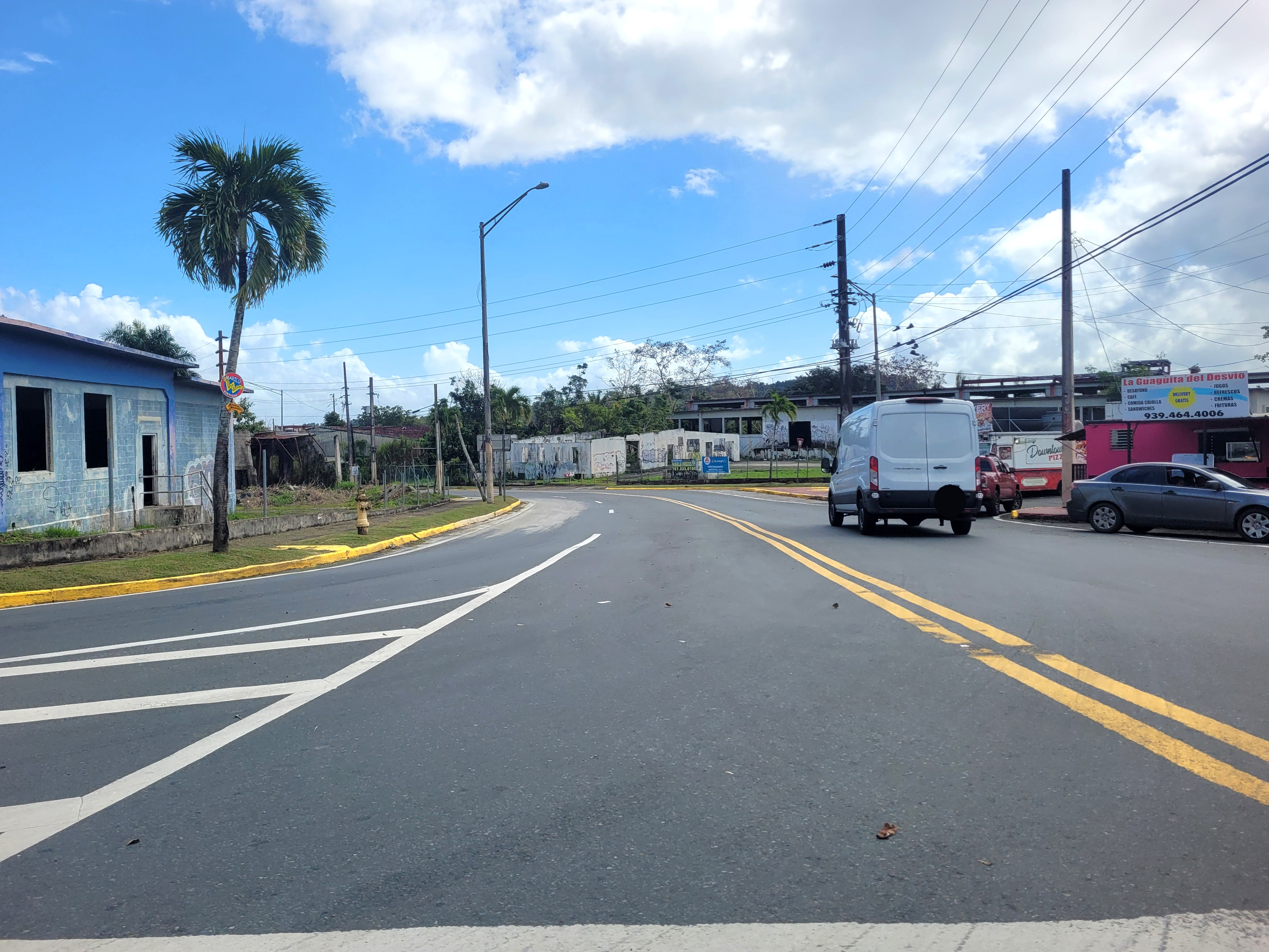
Puerto Rico Highway 8861 in Contorno

== See also ==
- List of communities in Puerto Rico
- List of barrios and sectors of Toa Alta, Puerto Rico
