= Puerto Rico Highway 891 =

Highway in Puerto Rico

Highway 891
- Ruta 891

Route information
- Maintained by Puerto Rico DTPW
- Length: 1.8 km (1.1 mi)

Major junctions
- West end: PR-159 in Corozal barrio-pueblo–Pueblo
- PR-821 in Corozal barrio-pueblo
- East end: PR-159 in Pueblo

Location
- Country: United States
- Territory: Puerto Rico
- Municipalities: Corozal

Highway system
- Roads in Puerto Rico; List
← PR-888	→ PR-901

Puerto Rico Highway 891 (PR-891) is the road that goes to downtown Corozal, the administrative center of Corozal, Puerto Rico. With a length of 1.8 km (1.1 mi), this road can be seen as the Alt 159, since it was the original alignment of PR-159 through the municipal center.

== Route description ==
This highway consists of one lane in each direction for most of its length. PR-891 begins at its junction with PR-159 in western Barrio Pueblo. Then, it crossess the Río Corozal, a tributary of the Río Cibuco, and enters the city center, where it meets with PR-821 and PR-807 around the town square. After those intersections, PR-891 heads to the east, leaving the downtown area until its end at PR-159 in eastern Barrio Pueblo.

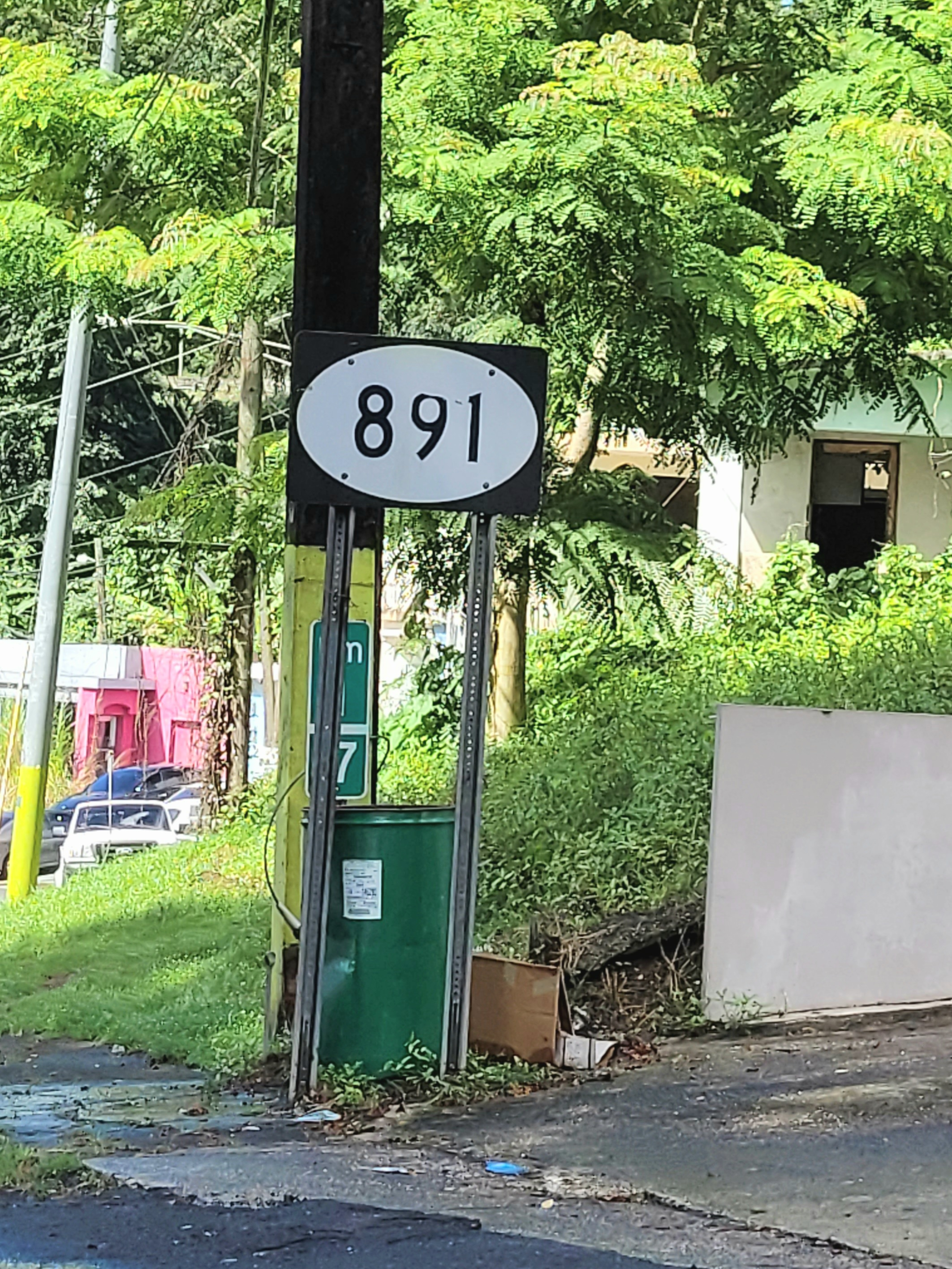
Sign for PR-891 in Barrio Pueblo, Corozal, looking west

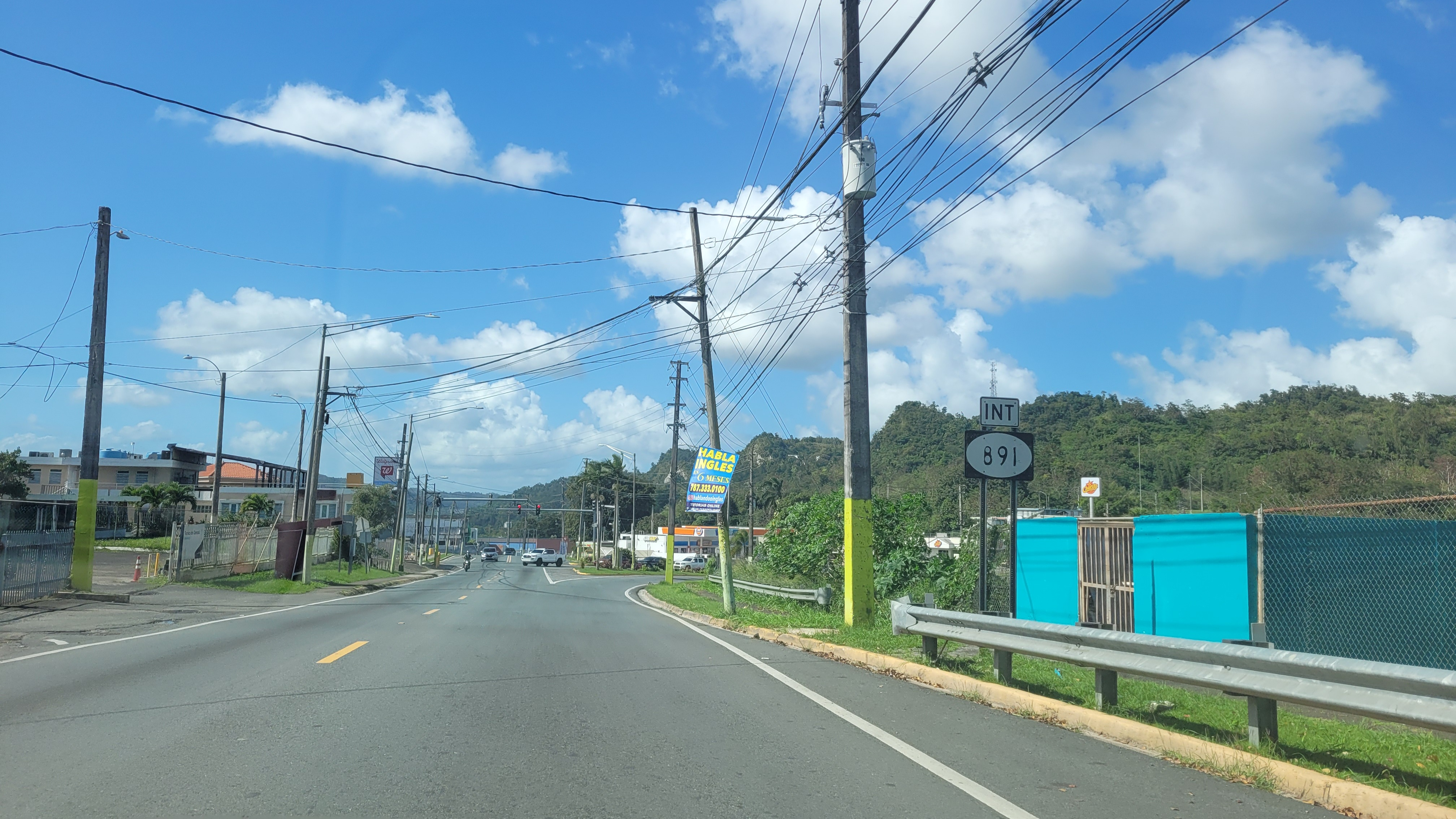
PR-159 west approaching PR-891 intersection in Barrio Pueblo, Corozal

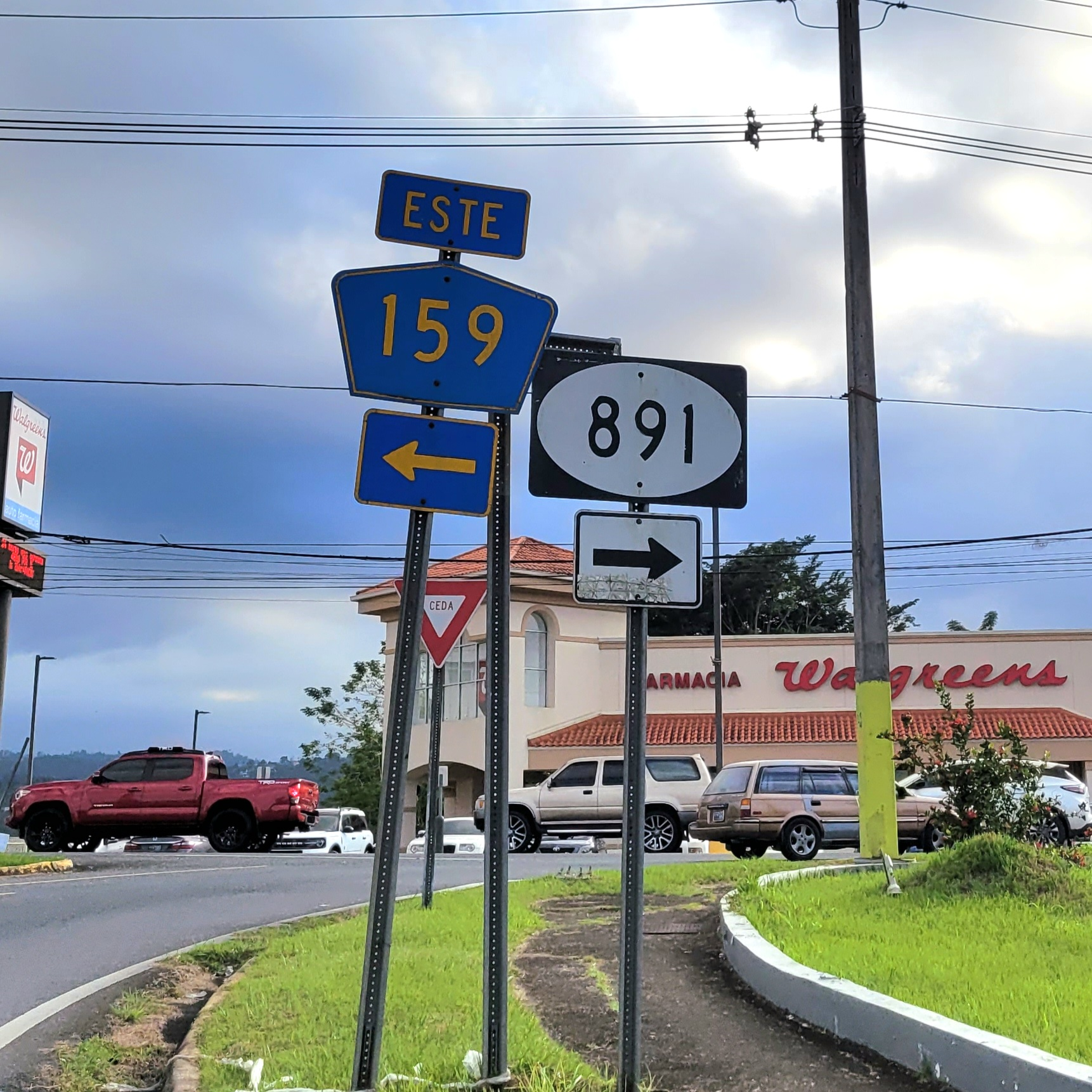
PR-159 east at PR-891 intersection in Barrio Pueblo, Corozal

=== Component streets ===
Puerto Rico Highway 891 makes its way within the urban area through the following streets:

- Calle Bou, from PR-159 to Calle Sixto Febus (Cervantes)
- Calle Sixto Febus (Cervantes), from Calle Bou to Calle Gándara (Note: Since Calle Sixto Febus (Cervantes) moves from east to west as a one-way street, traffic from west to east must move through Calle San Manuel and Calle Gándara south of the town square.)
- Calle Gándara, from Calle Sixto Febus (Cervantes) to Calle Urbano Ramírez (Toa Alta)
- Calle Urbano Ramírez (Toa Alta), from Calle Gándara to PR-159

== History ==
Like a part of PR-159, the entire length of PR-891 is part of the old Road No. 10, a highway that led from Dorado to Coamo through Toa Alta, Corozal and Orocovis until the 1953 Puerto Rico highway renumbering, a process implemented by the Puerto Rico Department of Transportation and Public Works (Spanish: Departamento de Transportación y Obras Públicas) that increased the insular highway network to connect existing routes with different locations around Puerto Rico. Route 10 extended from PR-165 (old Road No. 2) near Toa Alta to PR-14 (former Road No. 1) in downtown Coamo. Its original way currently corresponds to PR-165, from PR-8865 in Dorado to PR-159 in Toa Alta; PR-159, from PR-165 in Toa Alta to PR-568 in Corozal, except in downtown area, where PR-891 replaces PR-159; PR-568, from PR-159 in Corozal to PR-5155 in Orocovis; PR-5155, from PR-568 north of downtown to PR-155 south of downtown, and PR-155, from PR-5155 in Orocovis to PR-14 in Coamo.

== Major intersections ==
The entire route is located in Corozal.

Location	km	mi	Destinations	Notes
Corozal barrio-pueblo–Pueblo line	0.0	0.0	PR-159 – Morovis, Cibuco	Western terminus of PR-891; access to Toa Alta
Corozal barrio-pueblo	0.8	0.50	PR-821 (Calle San Ramón) – Abras	One-way street; northbound access via Calle Colón
Pueblo	1.8	1.1	PR-159 – Toa Alta, Morovis, Toa Baja	Eastern terminus of PR-891; access to Naranjito
1.000 mi = 1.609 km; 1.000 km = 0.621 mi: Incomplete access
