= Puerto Rico Highway 159 =

Highway in Puerto Rico

Highway 159
- Ruta 159

Route information
- Maintained by Puerto Rico DTPW
- Length: 20.6 km (12.8 mi)
- Existed: 1953–present

Major junctions
- West end: PR-155 / PR-6623 in Morovis barrio-pueblo
- PR-137 in Monte Llano; PR-619 in Monte Llano; PR-160 in Unibón; PR-647 / PR-5568 in Padilla–Cibuco; PR-568 in Cibuco–Padilla; PR-891 in Corozal barrio-pueblo–Pueblo; PR-818 in Pueblo; PR-821 in Corozal barrio-pueblo–Pueblo; PR-142 in Pueblo; PR-164 in Pueblo–Palmarejo
- East end: PR-165 in Quebrada Arenas–Quebrada Cruz

Location
- Country: United States
- Territory: Puerto Rico
- Municipalities: Morovis, Corozal, Toa Alta

Highway system
- Roads in Puerto Rico; List
← PR-158	→ PR-160

Puerto Rico Highway 159 (PR-159) is the main road from Morovis to Toa Alta, passing through the municipality of Corozal in Puerto Rico. This road begins in downtown Morovis, from its intersection with PR-155 and PR-6623 to its junction with PR-165 in Toa Alta. It is about 21 km (13 mi) long.

== Route description ==
This highway consists of one lane in each direction for most of its length between Morovis and Toa Alta. In Morovis, PR-159 travels from its intersection with PR-155 and PR-6623 in downtown to the Corozal municipal limit, crossing through Monte Llano and Unibón barrios. In Corozal, the road serves as the main access to some neighborhoods, including Padilla, Cibuco, Dos Bocas, Barrio Pueblo, downtown Corozal, Palmarejo and Abras. Through downtown Corozal, the route was replaced by PR-891, and PR-159 makes a bypass to evade the municipal center. In Toa Alta, PR-159 crosses though Quebrada Arenas barrio until its ending at PR-165 on the Quebrada Arenas–Quebrada Cruz line.

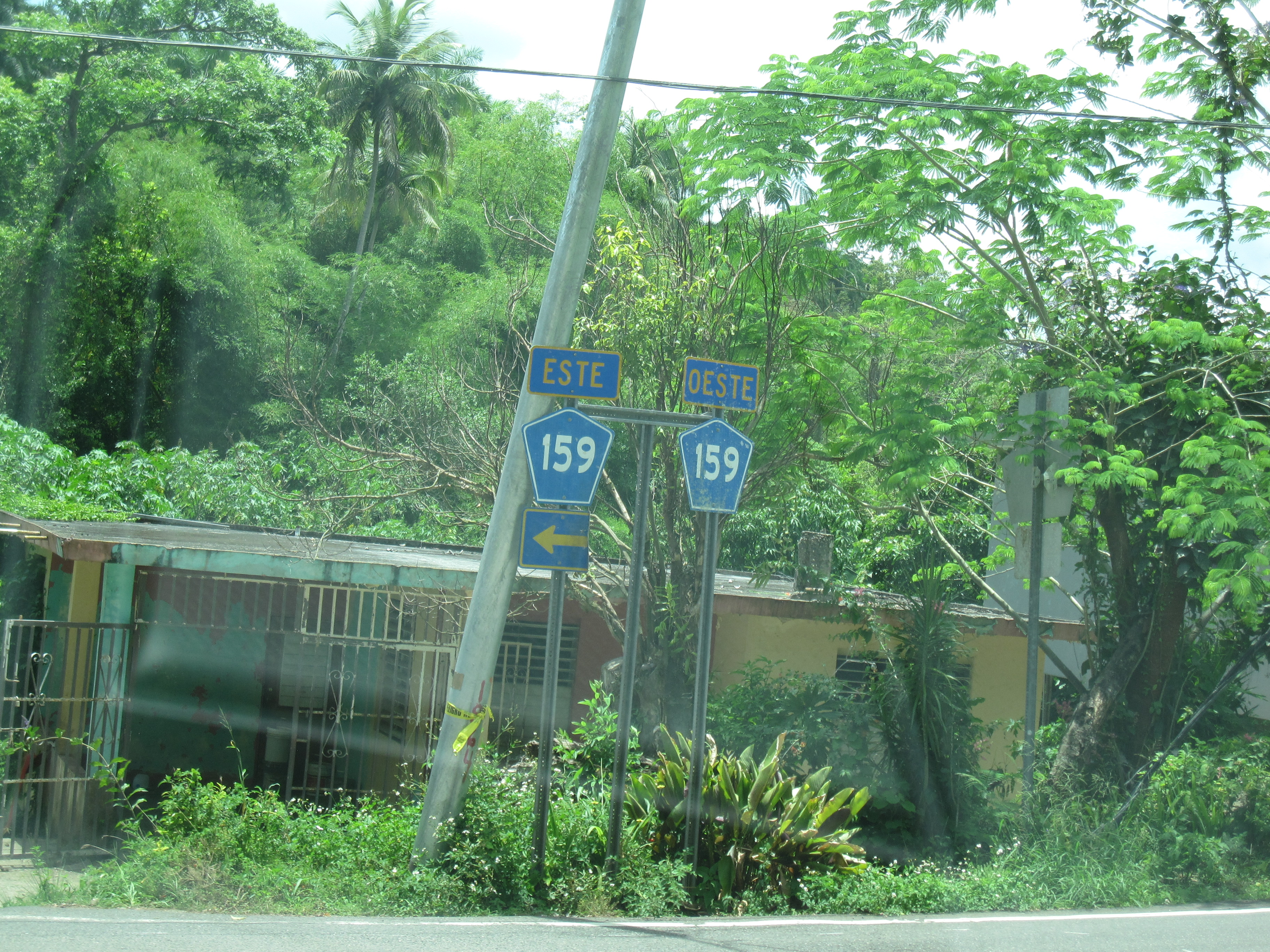
Signs for Puerto Rico Highway 159 east and west in Morovis

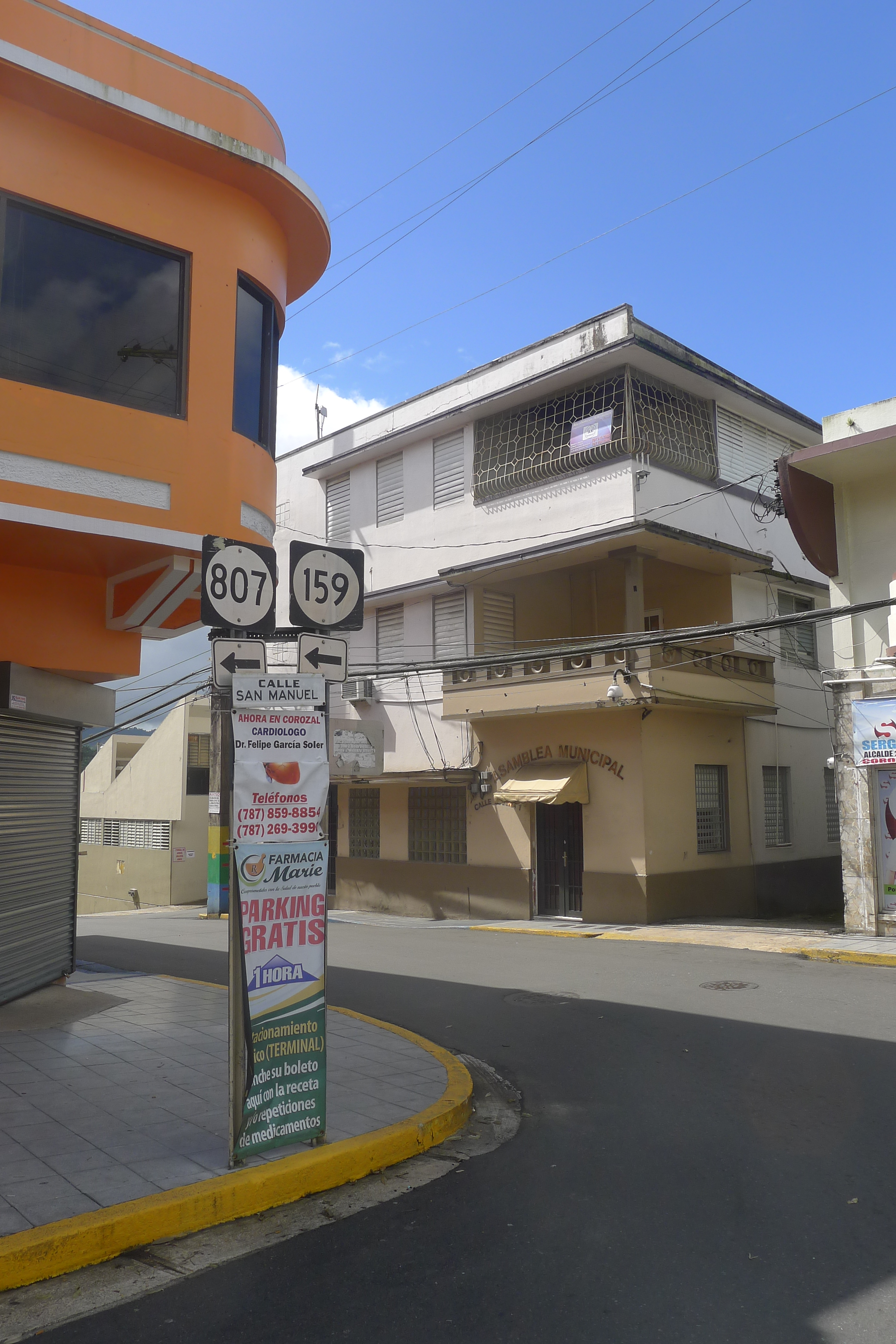
Signs for PR-159 and PR-807 in Corozal barrio-pueblo

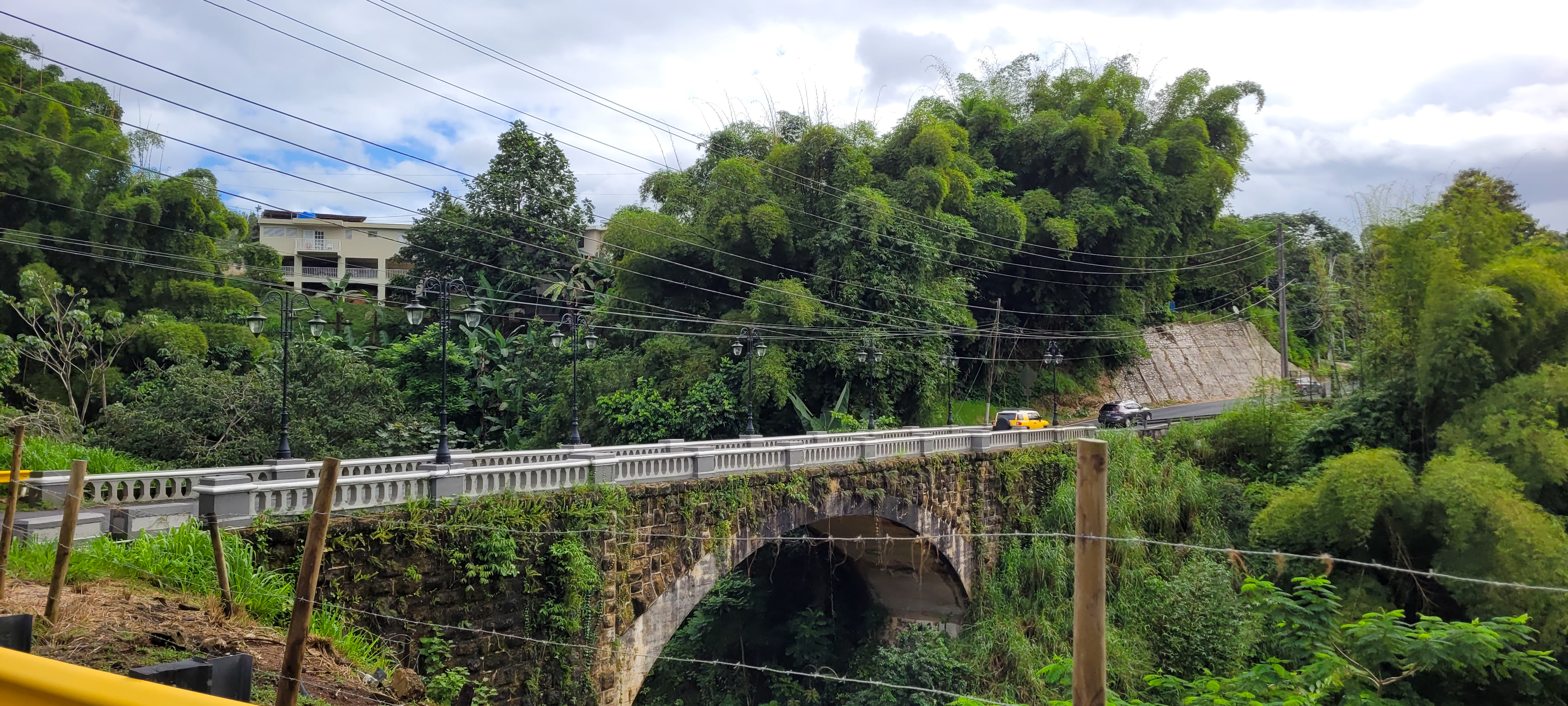
Mavilla Bridge in Corozal

Among the most important intersections are PR-137 (Expreso Ángel "Tony" Laureano), that heads to Vega Baja; PR-142 (Expreso de Corozal), that goes to Dorado; PR-155, the main highway between Vega Baja and Orocovis; PR-160, a route between Morovis and eastern Vega Baja; PR-164, the main highway to Naranjito, and PR-165, the main road between Toa Alta and Naranjito. On this highway lies the Plaza Aquarium shopping center, located in Toa Alta, and Mavilla Bridge, a centenary bridge which is located east of Corozal.

=== Maintenance ===
The issue of who is responsible for the road maintenance in Morovis was argued in April 2019. Representative Guillermo Miranda Rivera accused the mayor of Morovis, Carmen Maldonado González, of not doing road maintenance on Morovis' roads, while she blamed the central government for the condition of state roads in Morovis.

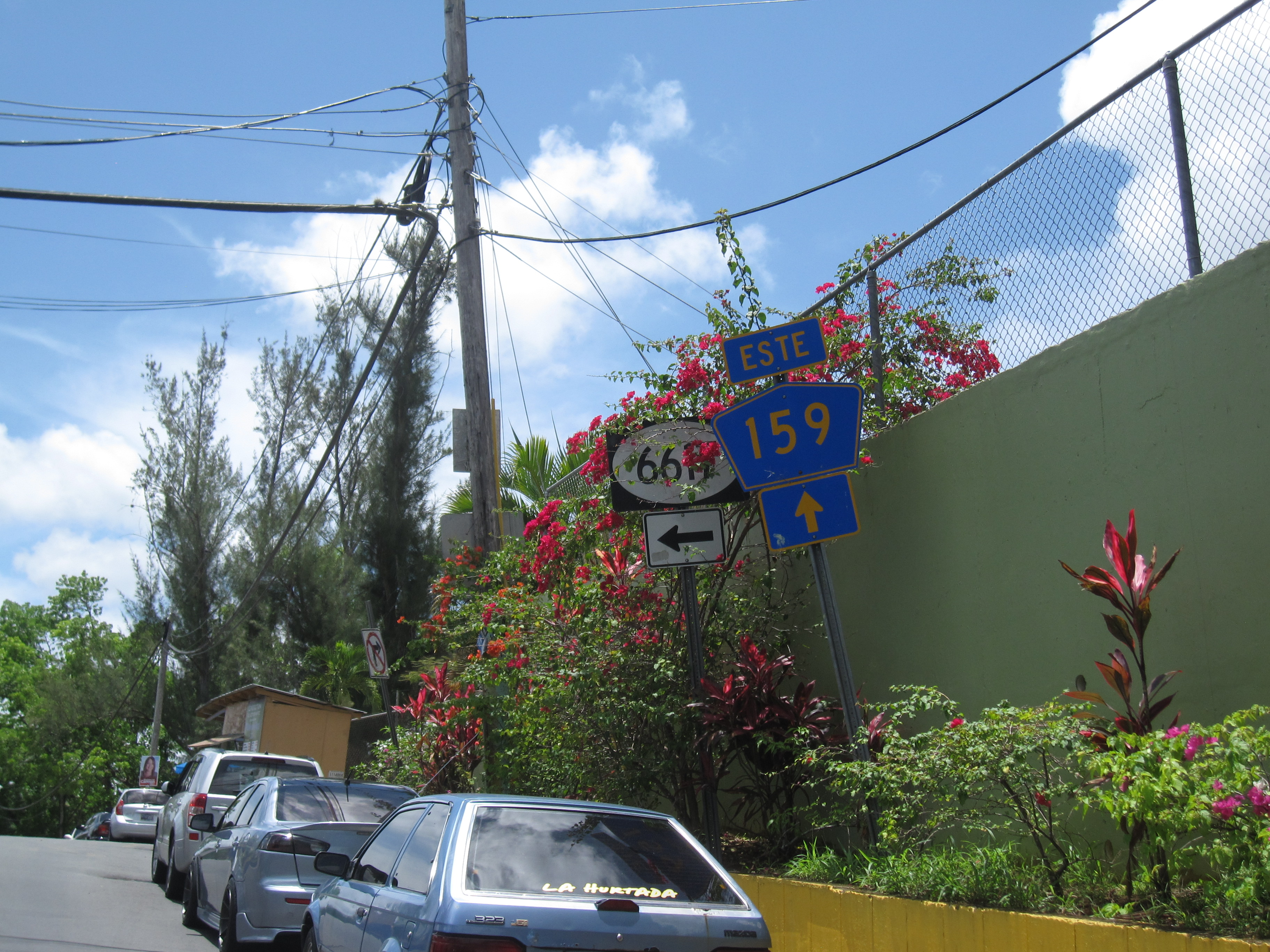
Puerto Rico Highway 159 east in Morovis

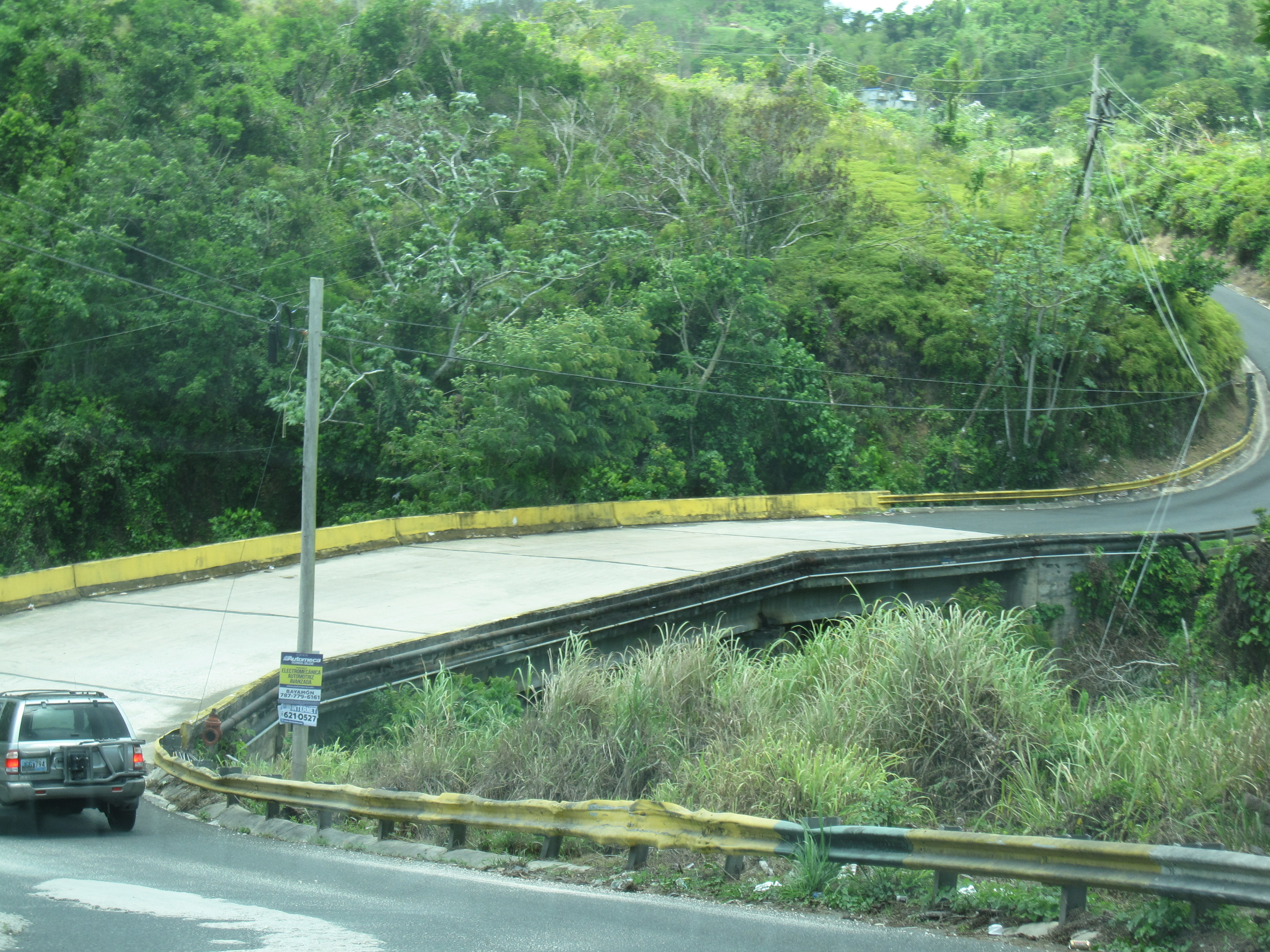
Bridge with Puerto Rico Highway 159 over Unibón River

=== Rivers crossed ===
Puerto Rico Highway 159 crosses the following rivers:

- Río Cibuco in Corozal
- Río Corozal in Corozal
- Río Mavilla in Corozal
- Río Unibón in Morovis

== History ==
Puerto Rico Highway 159 is part of original segments of old Roads No. 10 and No. 20 that existed until the 1953 Puerto Rico highway renumbering, a process implemented by the Puerto Rico Department of Transportation and Public Works (Spanish: Departamento de Transportación y Obras Públicas) that increased the insular highway network to connect existing routes with different locations around Puerto Rico. Road No. 10 was the highway that led from Dorado to Coamo through Toa Alta, Corozal and Orocovis, while Road No. 20 was a route from Naranjito to Ciales across Corozal and Morovis.

== Major intersections ==
Municipality	Location	km	mi	Destinations	Notes
Morovis	Morovis barrio-pueblo	0.0	0.0	PR-155 (Avenida Buena Vista) / PR-6623 (Calle Principal) – Morovis, Orocovis	Western terminus of PR-159; PR-155 northbound access via PR-6617
Morovis	Monte Llano	0.2– 0.3	0.12– 0.19	PR-6617 to PR-6619 – Morovis	PR-159 westbound detour
Morovis	Monte Llano	0.5	0.31	PR-137 (Expreso Ángel "Tony" Laureano Martínez) – Morovis, Vega Baja	
Morovis	Monte Llano	2.0	1.2	PR-619 – Cuchillas	
Morovis	Unibón	5.1– 5.2	3.2– 3.2	PR-6617 – Patrón	
Morovis	Unibón	5.2– 5.3	3.2– 3.3	PR-160 – Vega Baja	
Corozal	Padilla–Cibuco line	7.5	4.7	PR-647 / PR-5568 – Vega Alta, Subestación Experimental Agrícola	
Corozal	Padilla–Cibuco line	8.8– 8.9	5.5– 5.5	PR-817 – Cibuco	Unsigned
Corozal	Padilla–Cibuco line	9.9– 10.0	6.2– 6.2	PR-568 – Orocovis	
Corozal	Corozal barrio-pueblo–Pueblo line	13.4	8.3	PR-891 (Calle Prolongación Bou) – Corozal Centro	Western terminus of Avenida José Julián Grana Rodríguez
Corozal	Pueblo	13.6– 13.7	8.5– 8.5	PR-818 – Cibuco	
Corozal	Corozal barrio-pueblo–Pueblo line	14.6	9.1	PR-821 – Corozal, Abras	
Corozal	Pueblo	15.1– 15.2	9.4– 9.4	PR-142 north (Carretera José Antonio "Sonny" Rodríguez Ortiz) – Dorado	
Corozal	Pueblo	15.5– 15.6	9.6– 9.7	PR-891 (Calle Toa Alta) – Corozal Centro	Eastern terminus of Avenida José Julián Grana Rodríguez
Corozal	Pueblo–Palmarejo line	16.0	9.9	PR-164 south – Naranjito	
Corozal	Palmarejo–Abras line	17.9– 18.0	11.1– 11.2	Puente de Mavilla over the Río Mavilla	
Corozal	Palmarejo–Abras line	19.0– 19.1	11.8– 11.9	PR-806 – Toa Alta	Access to Quebrada Arenas
Toa Alta	Quebrada Arenas–Quebrada Cruz line	20.6	12.8	PR-165 – Toa Baja, Naranjito	Eastern terminus of PR-159; access to Toa Alta
1.000 mi = 1.609 km; 1.000 km = 0.621 mi: Incomplete access; Route transition
