= Puerto Rico Highway 821 =

Highway in Puerto Rico

Highway 821
- Ruta 821

Route information
- Maintained by Puerto Rico DTPW
- Length: 6.0 km (3.7 mi)
- Existed: 1953–present

Major junctions
- South end: PR-891 in Corozal barrio-pueblo
- PR-159 in Corozal barrio-pueblo–Pueblo
- North end: PR-630 in Abras

Location
- Country: United States
- Territory: Puerto Rico
- Municipalities: Corozal

Highway system
- Roads in Puerto Rico; List
← PR-820	→ PR-823

Puerto Rico Highway 821 (PR-821) is a north–south road located in the municipality of Corozal in Puerto Rico. With a length of 6.0 km (3.7 mi), it begins at its intersection with PR-891 between downtown Corozal and Barrio Pueblo, passing through Abras barrio until its terminus at PR-630 near Mavilla barrio of Vega Alta municipality.

== Route description ==
This highway consists of one lane in each direction for most of its length, except in the southern terminus, where Calle San Ramón is a one-way street with a single lane from Calle Colón to PR-891. After that, PR-821 heads to the north, meeting with PR-159 on its way to Abras. Between Barrio Pueblo and Abras, PR-821 becomes rural, connecting several neighborhoods and sectors until its transition to PR-630 near the Vega Alta municipal limit.

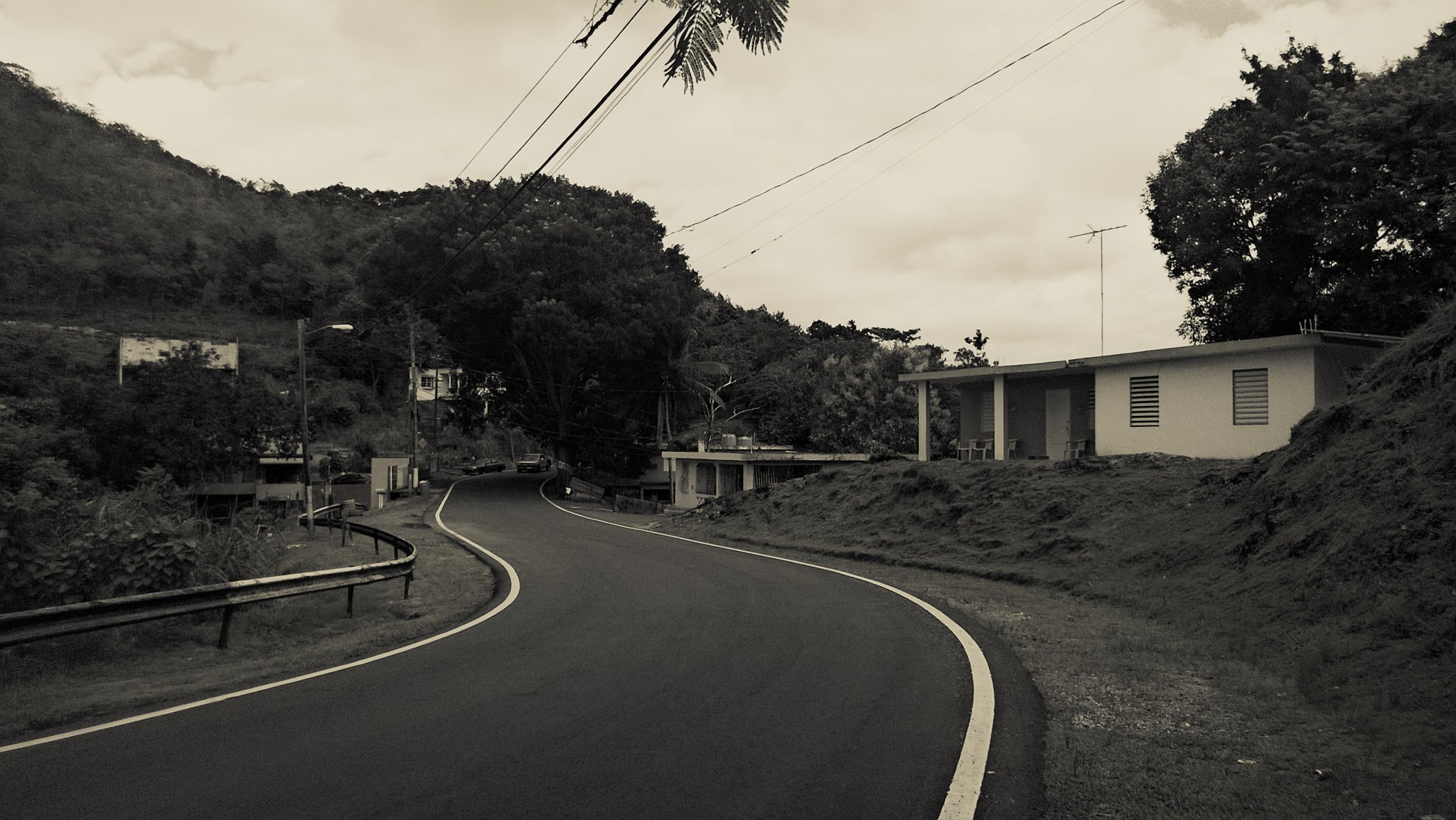
PR-821 north in Abras barrio

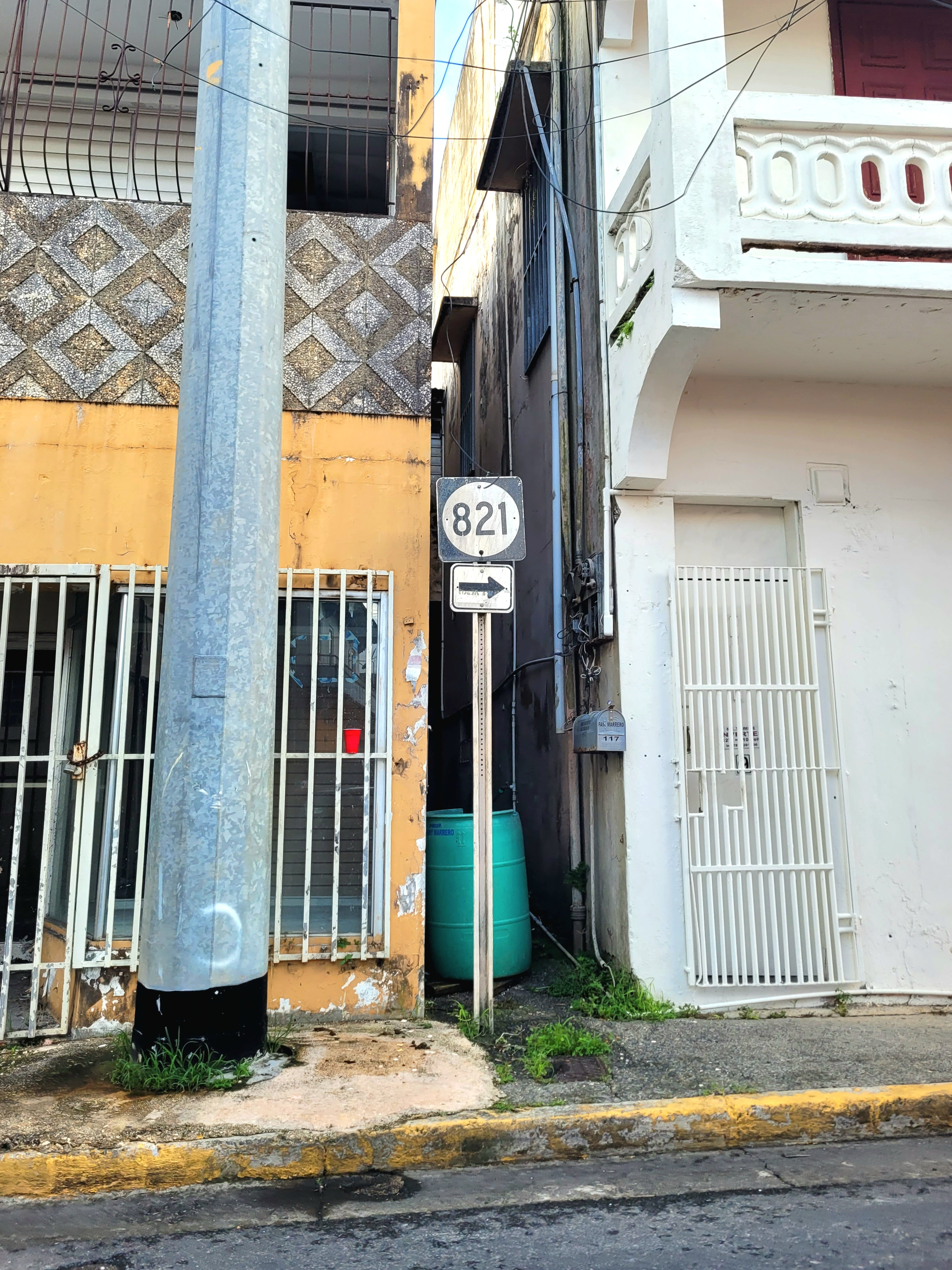
Sign for PR-821 in Corozal barrio-pueblo

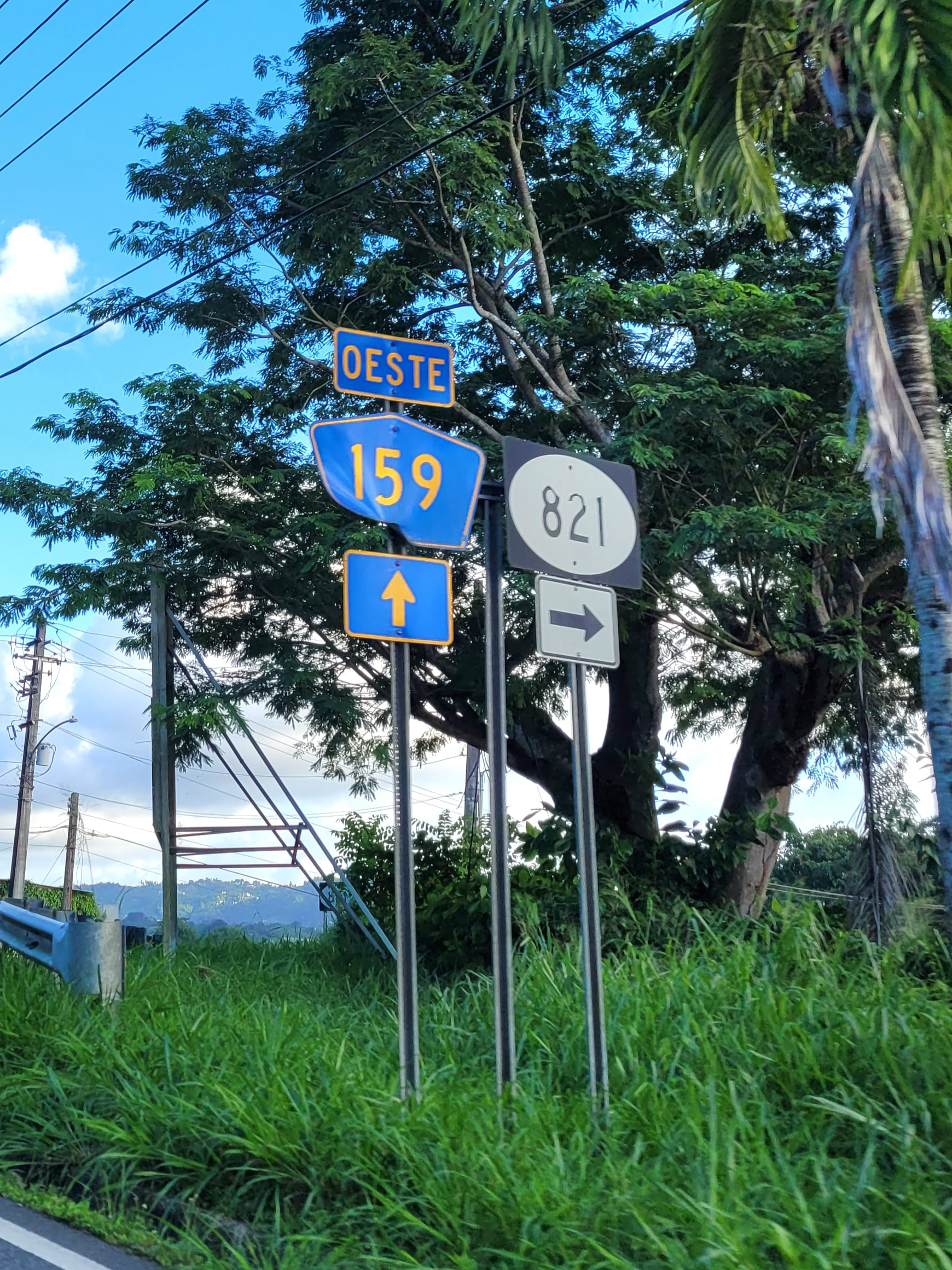
PR-159 east at PR-821 junction

== History ==
Prior to its numerical designation, PR-821 was only known as Camino del Abra. The current numerical designation corresponds to the 1953 Puerto Rico highway renumbering, a process implemented by the Puerto Rico Department of Transportation and Public Works (Spanish: Departamento de Transportación y Obras Públicas) that increased the insular highway network to connect existing routes with different locations around Puerto Rico.

== Major intersections ==
The entire route is located in Corozal.

Location	km	mi	Destinations	Notes
Corozal barrio-pueblo	0.0	0.0	PR-891 (Calle Sixto Febus) – Corozal	Southern terminus of PR-821; one-way street; eastbound access via Calle Bou and Calle San Manuel
Corozal barrio-pueblo–Pueblo line	0.4	0.25	PR-159 (Avenida José Julián Grana Rodríguez) – Morovis, Toa Alta, Naranjito	
Abras	6.0	3.7	PR-630 – Vega Alta	Northern terminus of PR-821
1.000 mi = 1.609 km; 1.000 km = 0.621 mi: Incomplete access
