= Monte Llano, Morovis, Puerto Rico =

Barrio of Puerto Rico

Monte Llano Montellano
- Barrio
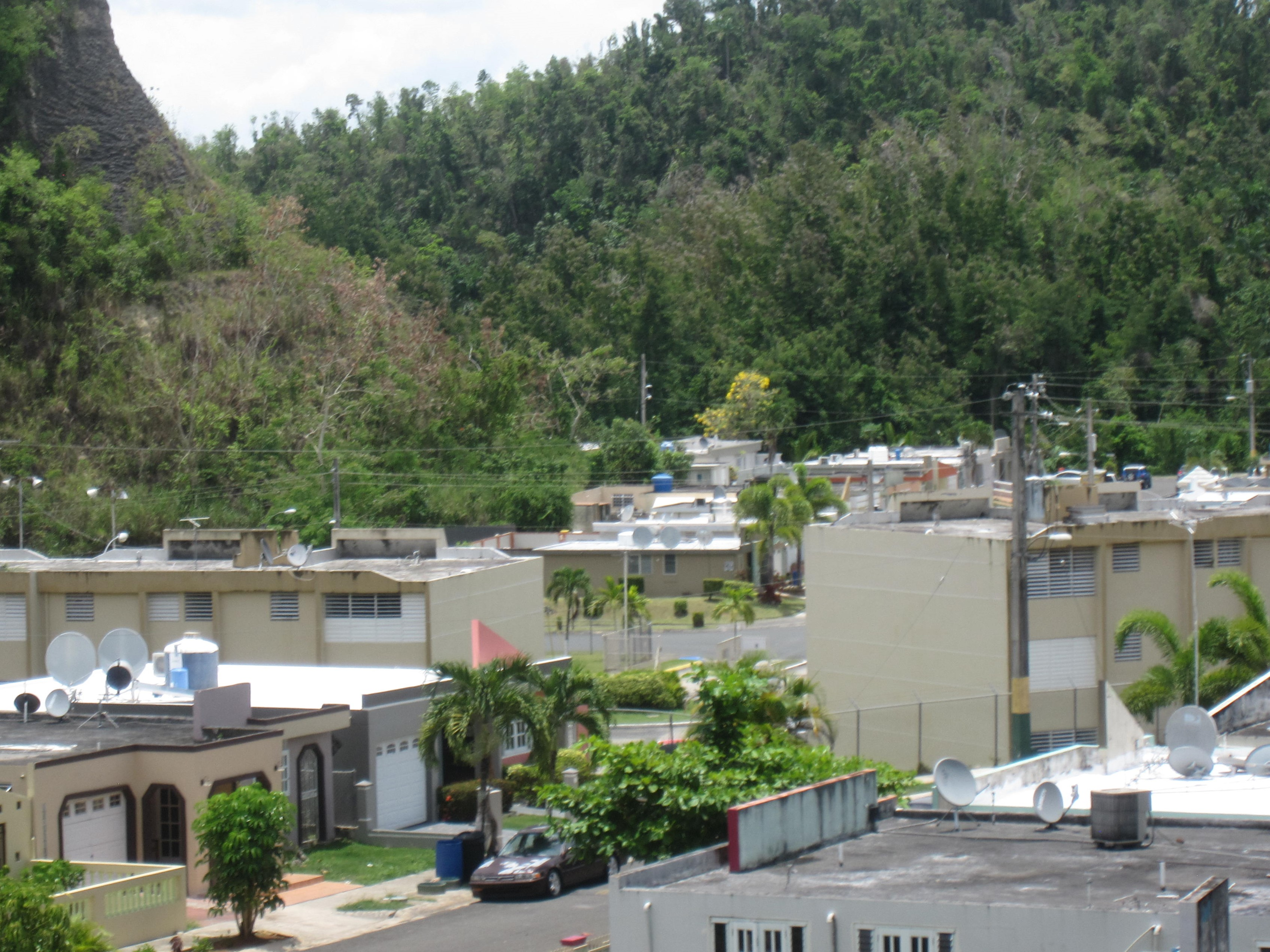
- Houses at the foot of mountains in Monte Llano

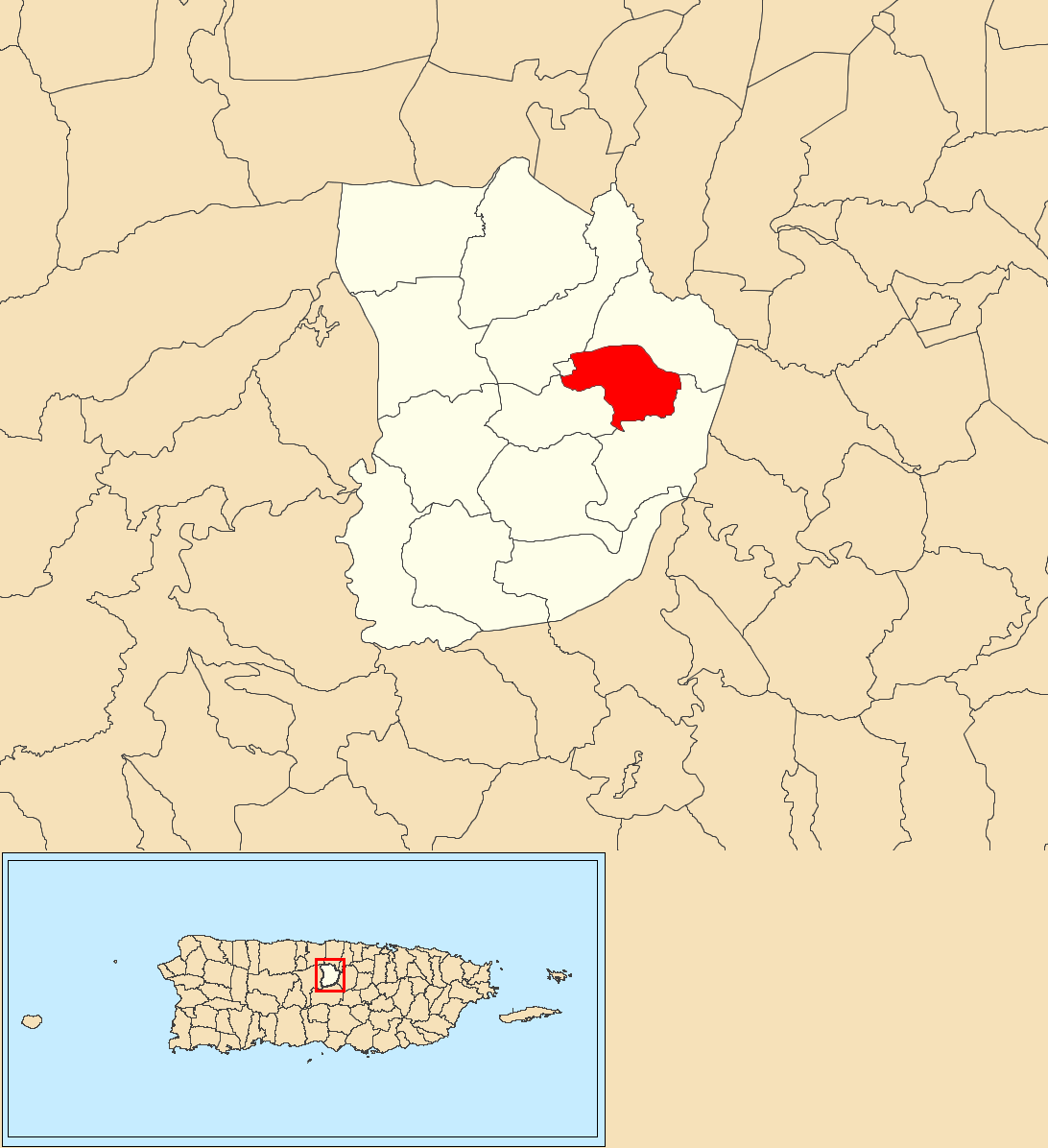
- Location of Monte Llano within the municipality of Morovis shown in red

- Location of Puerto Rico
- Coordinates: 18°19′30″N 66°23′23″W
- Commonwealth: Puerto Rico
- Municipality: Morovis

Area
  - Total: 1.6 sq mi (4.1 km^{2})
  - Land: 1.6 sq mi (4.1 km^{2})
  - Water: 0 sq mi (0 km^{2})
- Elevation: 827 ft (252 m)

Population (2010)
  - Total: 2,948
  - Density: 1,842.5/sq mi (711.4/km^{2})
- Source: 2010 Census
- Time zone: UTC−4 (AST)
- Zip code: 00687

Monte Llano is a barrio in the municipality of Morovis, Puerto Rico. Monte Llano has about 15 sectors and its population in 2010 was 2,948.

== History ==
Monte Llano was in Spain's gazetteers until Puerto Rico was ceded by Spain in the aftermath of the Spanish–American War under the terms of the Treaty of Paris of 1898 and became an unincorporated territory of the United States. In 1899, the United States Department of War conducted a census of Puerto Rico finding that the population of Monte Llano barrio was 466.

Historical population
Census	Pop.	Note	%±
1900	466		—
1910	605		29.8%
1920	564		−6.8%
1930	1,047		85.6%
1940	1,064		1.6%
1950	1,278		20.1%
1960	1,311		2.6%
1970	0		−100.0%
1980	1,986		—
1990	2,197		10.6%
2000	2,781		26.6%
2010	2,948		6.0%
U.S. Decennial Census; 1899 (shown as 1900) 1910-1930; 1930-1950 1980-2000 2010

== Sectors ==
Barrios (which are, in contemporary times, roughly comparable to minor civil divisions) in turn are further subdivided into smaller local populated place areas/units called sectores (sectors in English). The types of sectores may vary, from normally sector to urbanización to reparto to barriada to residencial, among others.

The following sectors are in Monte Llano barrio:

Apartamentos Morovis Elderly, Apartamentos Parque del Retiro II, Avenida Corozal, Condominio Mariví, Residencial Padre Tomás Sorolla, Sector Avenida Patrón (Calle Patrón), Sector El Tambor, Sector La Aldea, Sector La Fábrica, Sector La Trinchera, Tramo Carretera 159, Urbanización Colinas de Montellano, Urbanización Estancias de Montellano, Urbanización Jardines de Montellano, and Urbanización Russe.

== Gallery ==
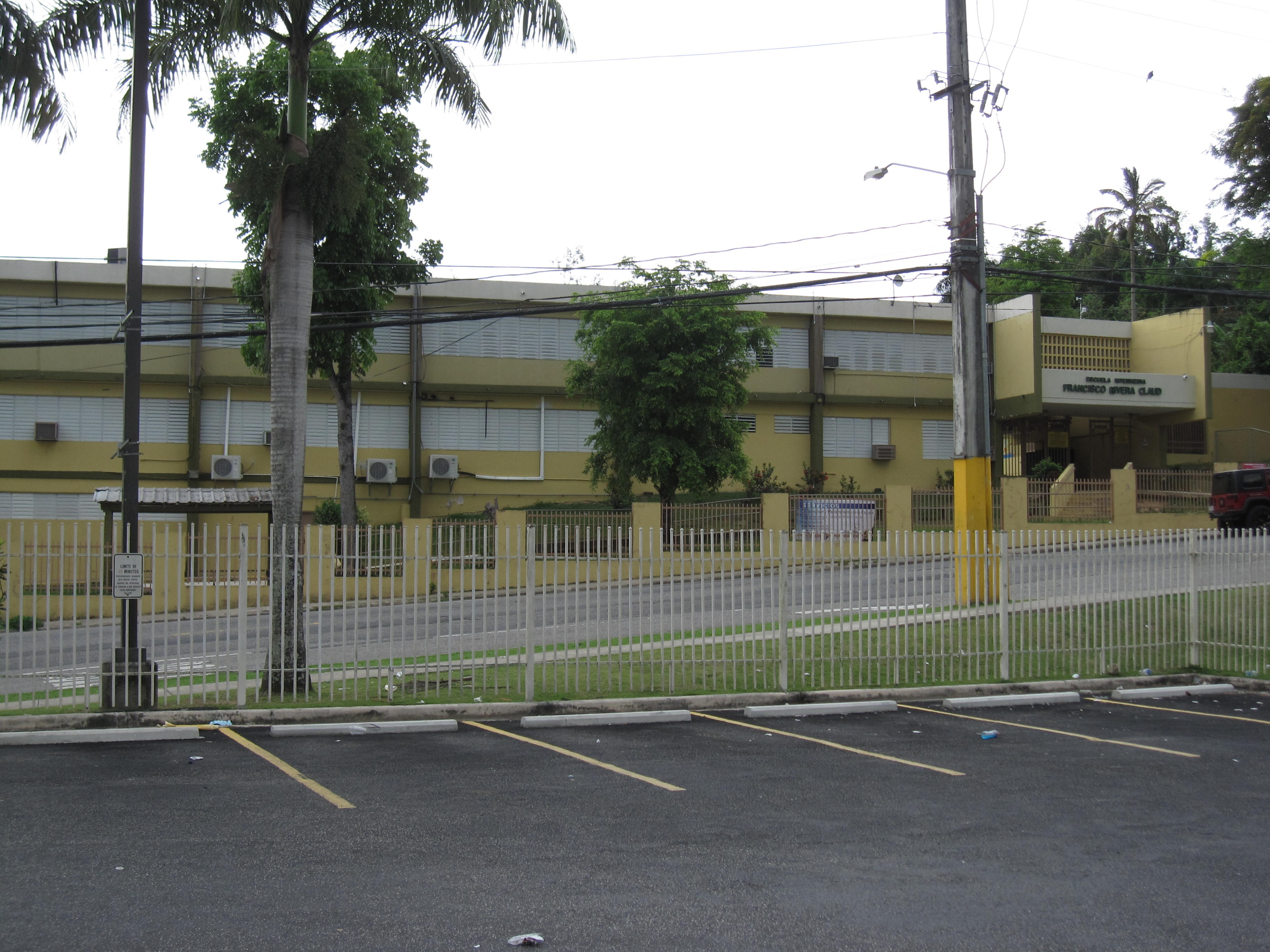
Francisco Rivera Claudio School in Monte Llano

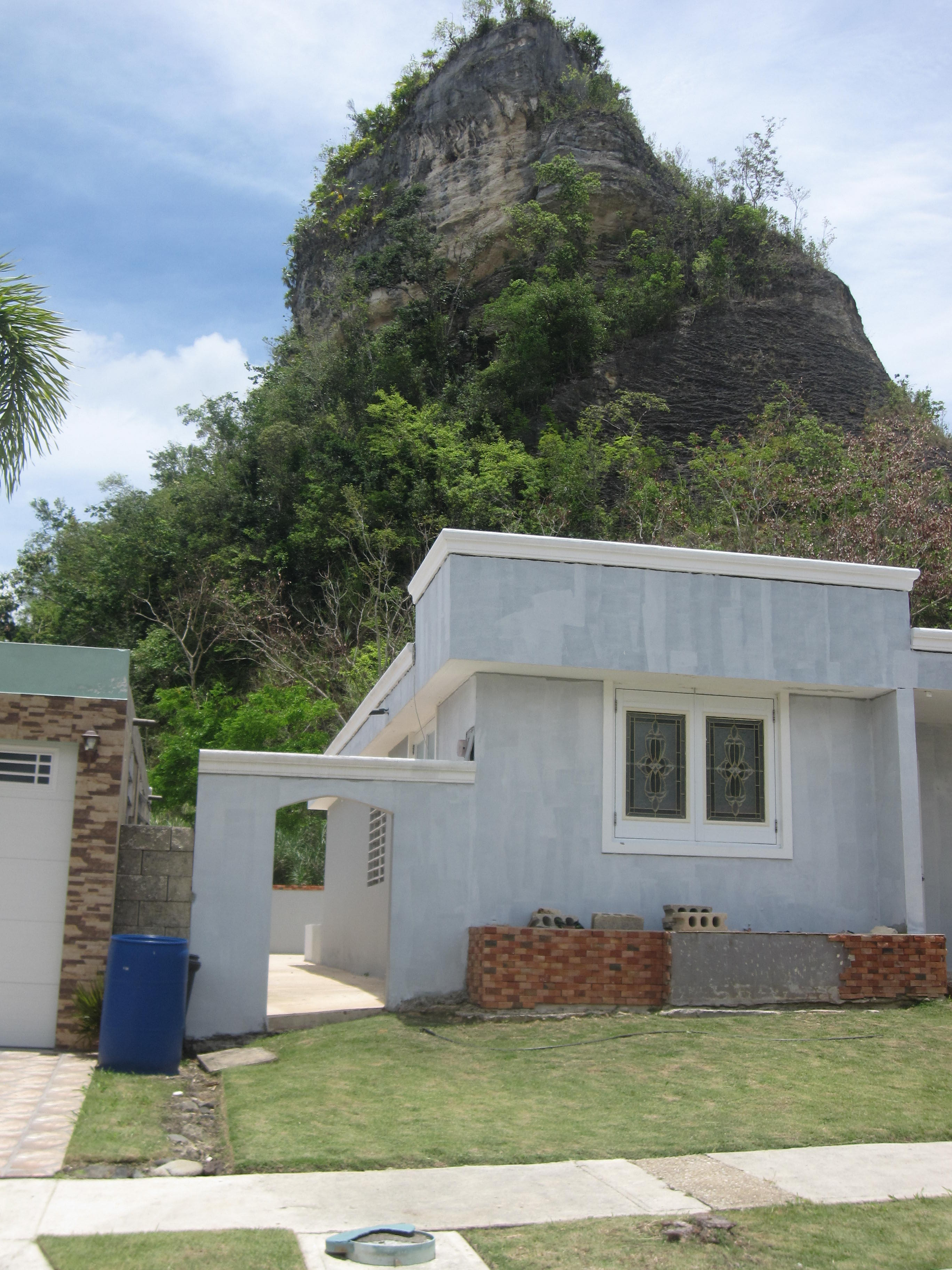
Landmark mountain in Monte Llano

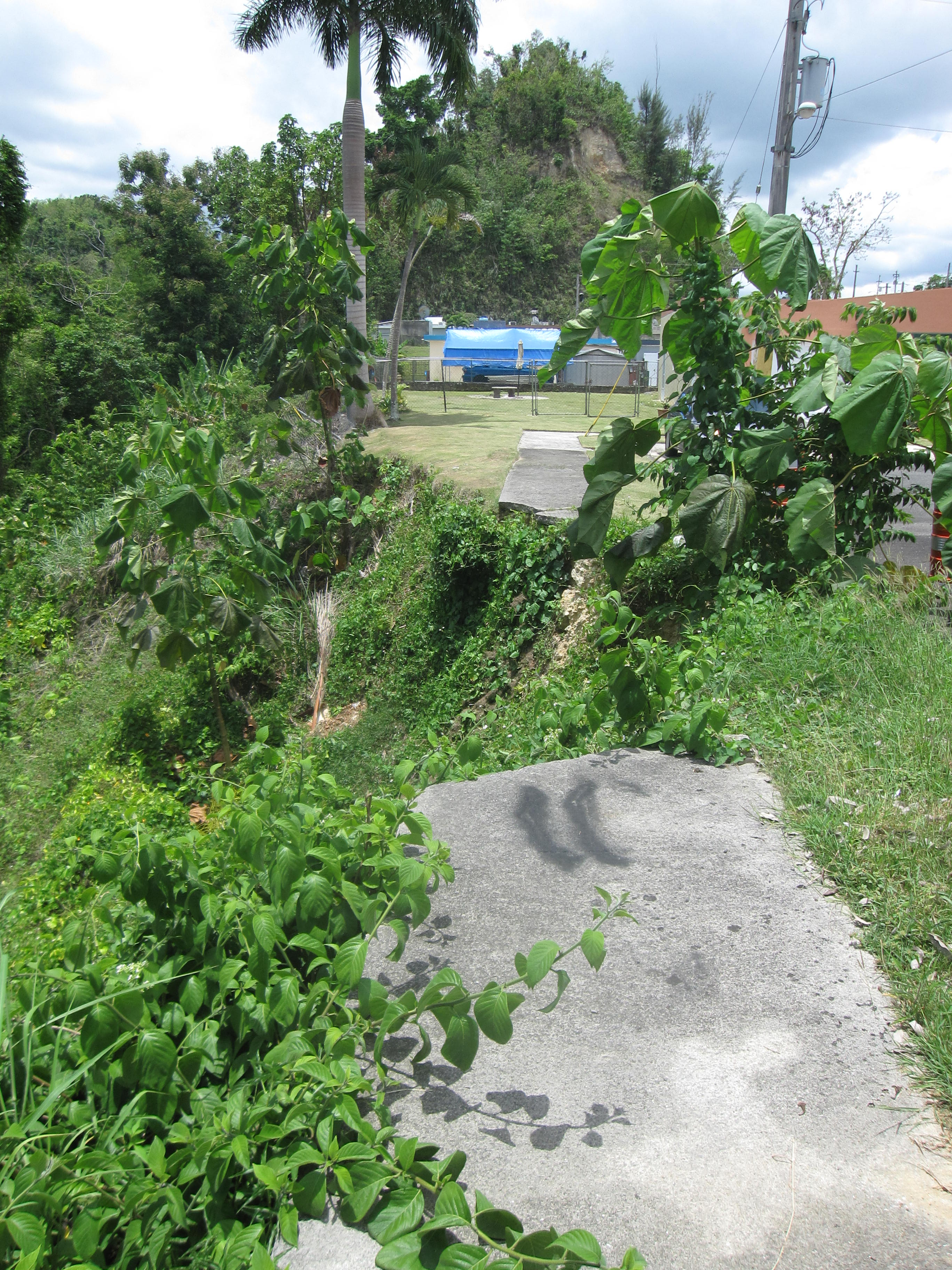
Landslide caused by Hurricane Maria in Monte Llano

== See also ==
- List of communities in Puerto Rico
- List of barrios and sectors of Morovis, Puerto Rico
