= Pueblo, Corozal, Puerto Rico =

Barrio of Puerto Rico

Pueblo
- Barrio
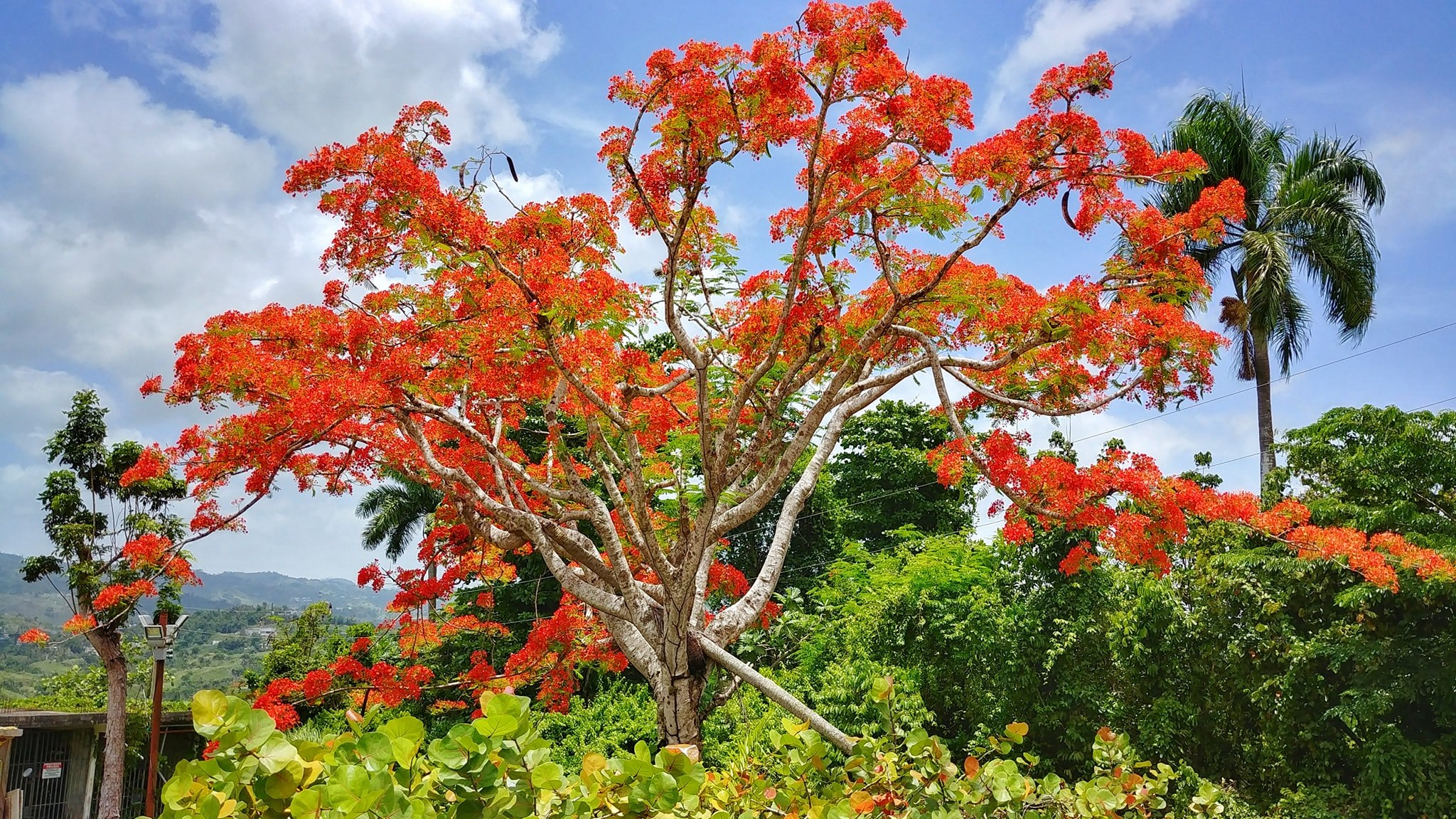
- Flowered flamboyant in Barrio Pueblo

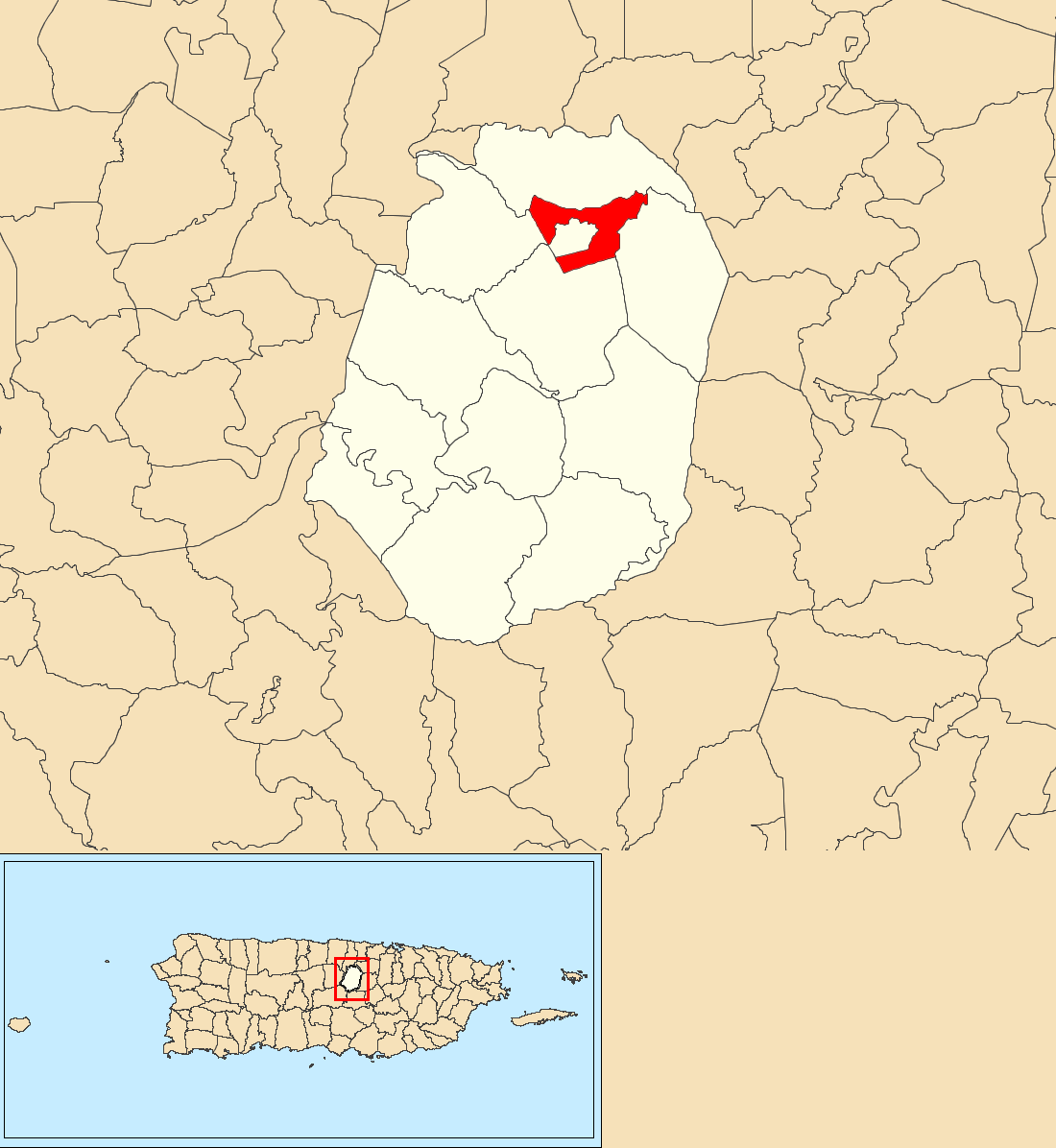
- Location of Pueblo within the municipality of Corozal shown in red

- Location of Puerto Rico
- Coordinates: 18°20′46″N 66°18′19″W
- Commonwealth: Puerto Rico
- Municipality: Corozal

Area
  - Total: 1.07 sq mi (2.8 km^{2})
  - Land: 1.07 sq mi (2.8 km^{2})
  - Water: 0 sq mi (0 km^{2})
- Elevation: 312 ft (95 m)

Population (2010)
  - Total: 2,991
  - Density: 2,795.3/sq mi (1,079.3/km^{2})
- Source: 2010 Census
- Time zone: UTC−4 (AST)

Pueblo is an urban barrio in the municipality of Corozal, Puerto Rico. Its population in 2010 was 2,991.

== History ==
Pueblo was in Spain's gazetteers until Puerto Rico was ceded by Spain in the aftermath of the Spanish–American War under the terms of the Treaty of Paris of 1898 and became an unincorporated territory of the United States. In 1899, the United States Department of War conducted a census of Puerto Rico finding that the population of Pueblo was 1,057.

== Features and demographics ==
Pueblo has 1.07 square miles (2.8 km^{2}) of land area and no water area. In 2010, its population was 2,991 with a population density of 2,795.3 inhabitants per square mile (1,079.3/km^{2}).

Historical population
Census	Pop.	Note	%±
1900	1,057		—
1940	308		—
1950	2,414		683.8%
1960	2,752		14.0%
1970	0		−100.0%
1980	5,206		—
1990	3,953		−24.1%
2000	3,639		−7.9%
2010	2,991		−17.8%
U.S. Decennial Census; 1899 (shown as 1900) 1910-1930; 1930-1950 1980-2000 2010

== Sectors ==
Barrios (which are, in contemporary times, roughly comparable to minor civil divisions) in turn are further subdivided into smaller local populated place areas/units called sectores (sectors in English). The types of sectores may vary, from normally sector to urbanización to reparto to barriada to residencial, among others.

The following sectors are in Pueblo barrio:

Barriada Cuba Libre (Calle María Bou, Calle O’Neil, Calle Ramos, Calle Rivera), Calle Nieves, Sector Georgies Pizza, Sector Guayabal, Sector Idilio, Sector Kike Matos, Sector La Alcoba, Sector La Bodega, Sector La Frigo, Sector Lin Santos, Sector Los Moreno, Sector Los Torres, Sector Mario Electricista, Sector Maya Marzán, Sector Paseo del Río, Urbanización Cerromonte, Urbanización Monterrey, and Urbanización Monte Verde.

== Gallery ==
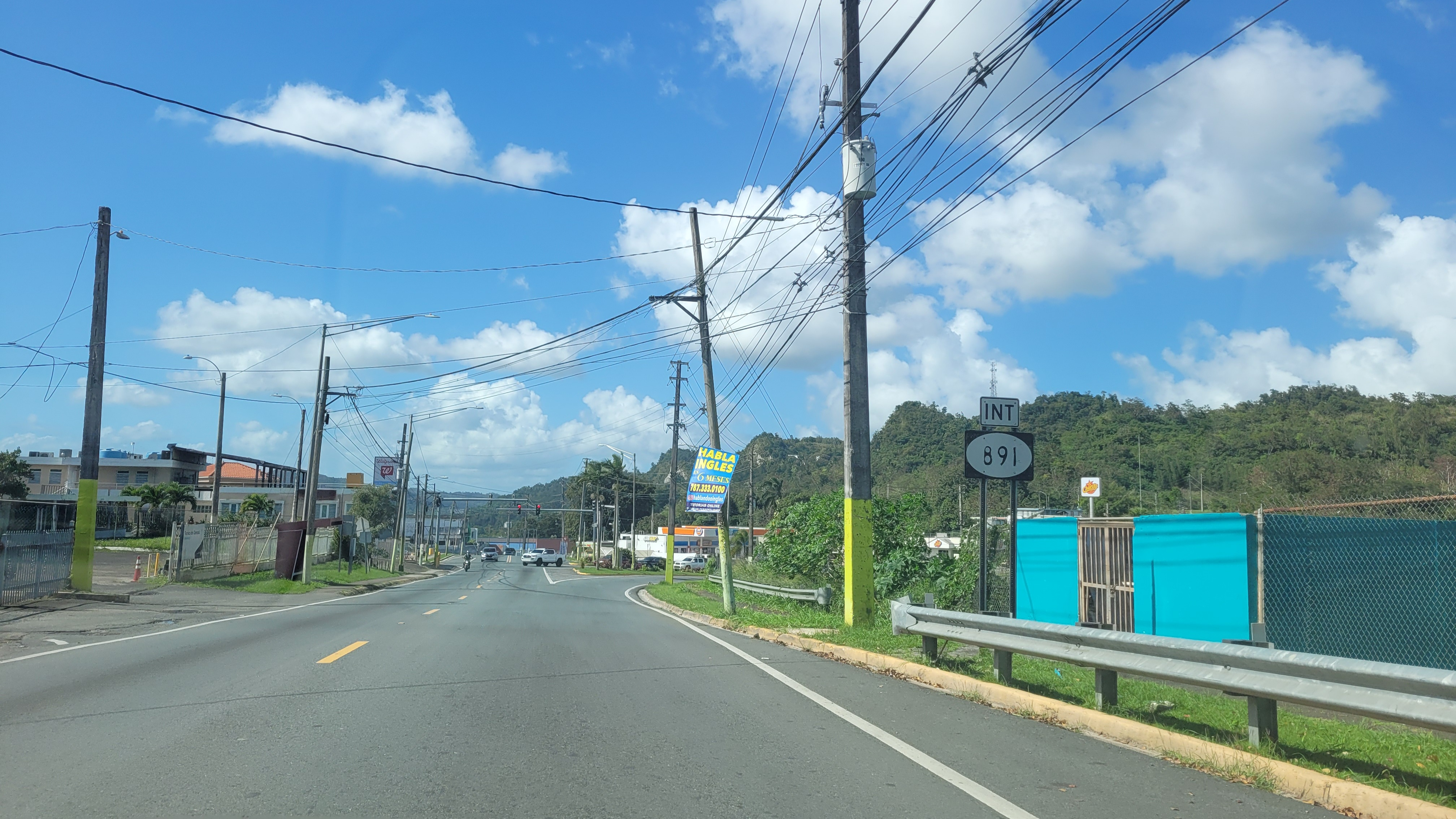
Puerto Rico Highway 159 in Barrio Pueblo

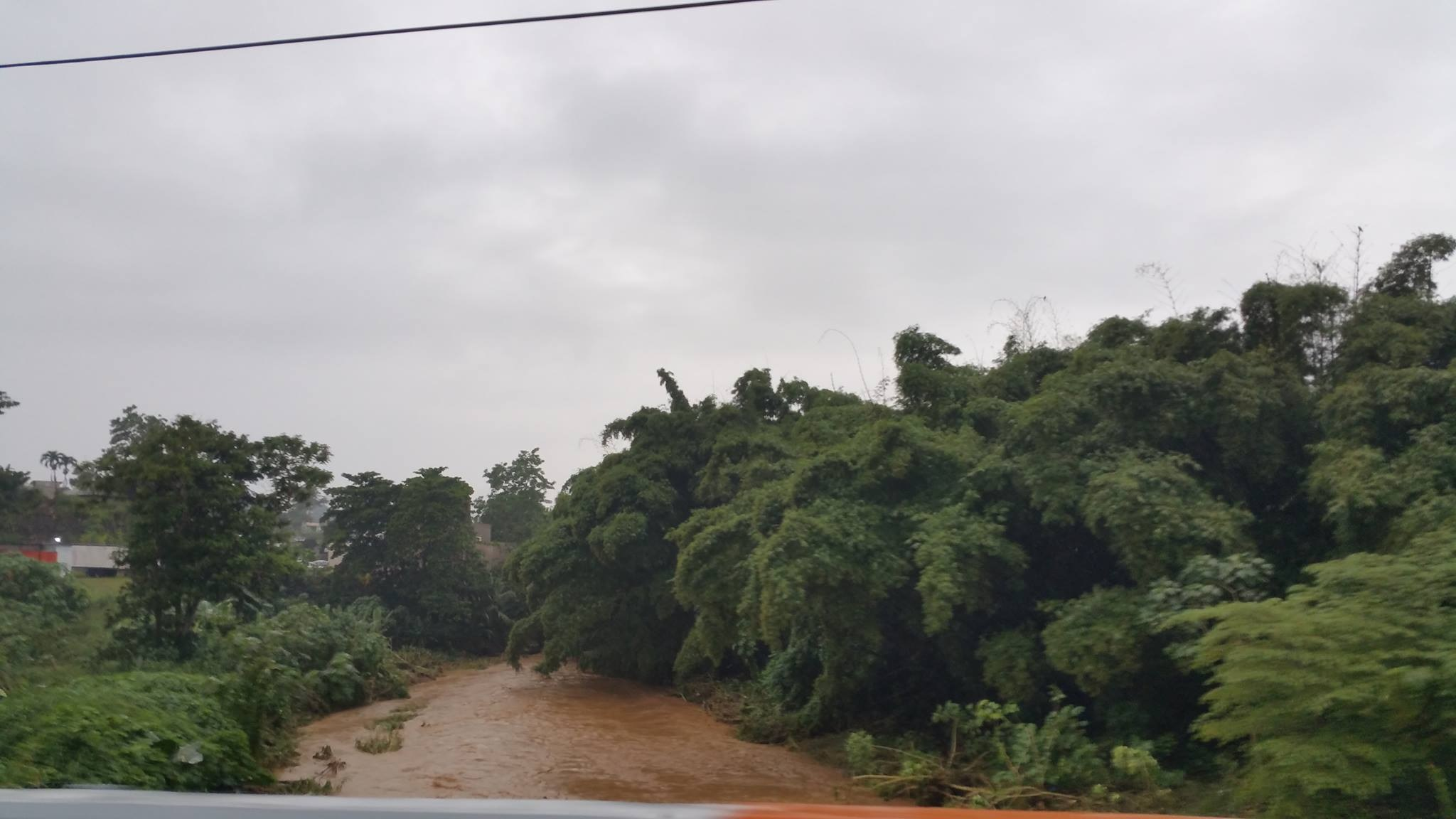
Corozal River from Puerto Rico Highway 159 in Barrio Pueblo

== See also ==
- List of communities in Puerto Rico
- List of barrios and sectors of Corozal, Puerto Rico
