= Corozal barrio-pueblo =

Historical and administrative center (seat) of Corozal, Puerto Rico

Corozal barrio-pueblo Pueblo de Corozal
- Municipality Seat
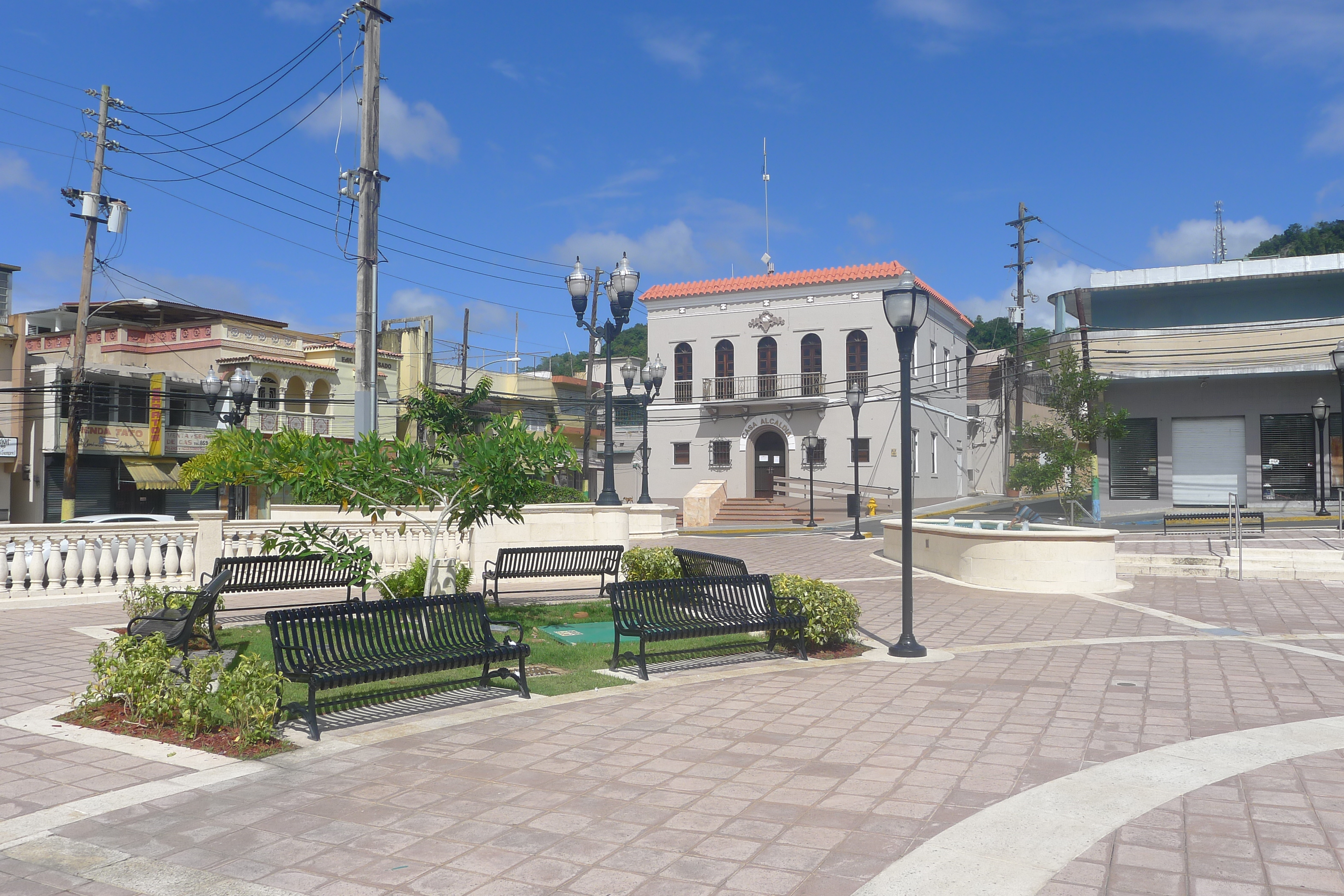
- Main square with the Corozal city hall in the center

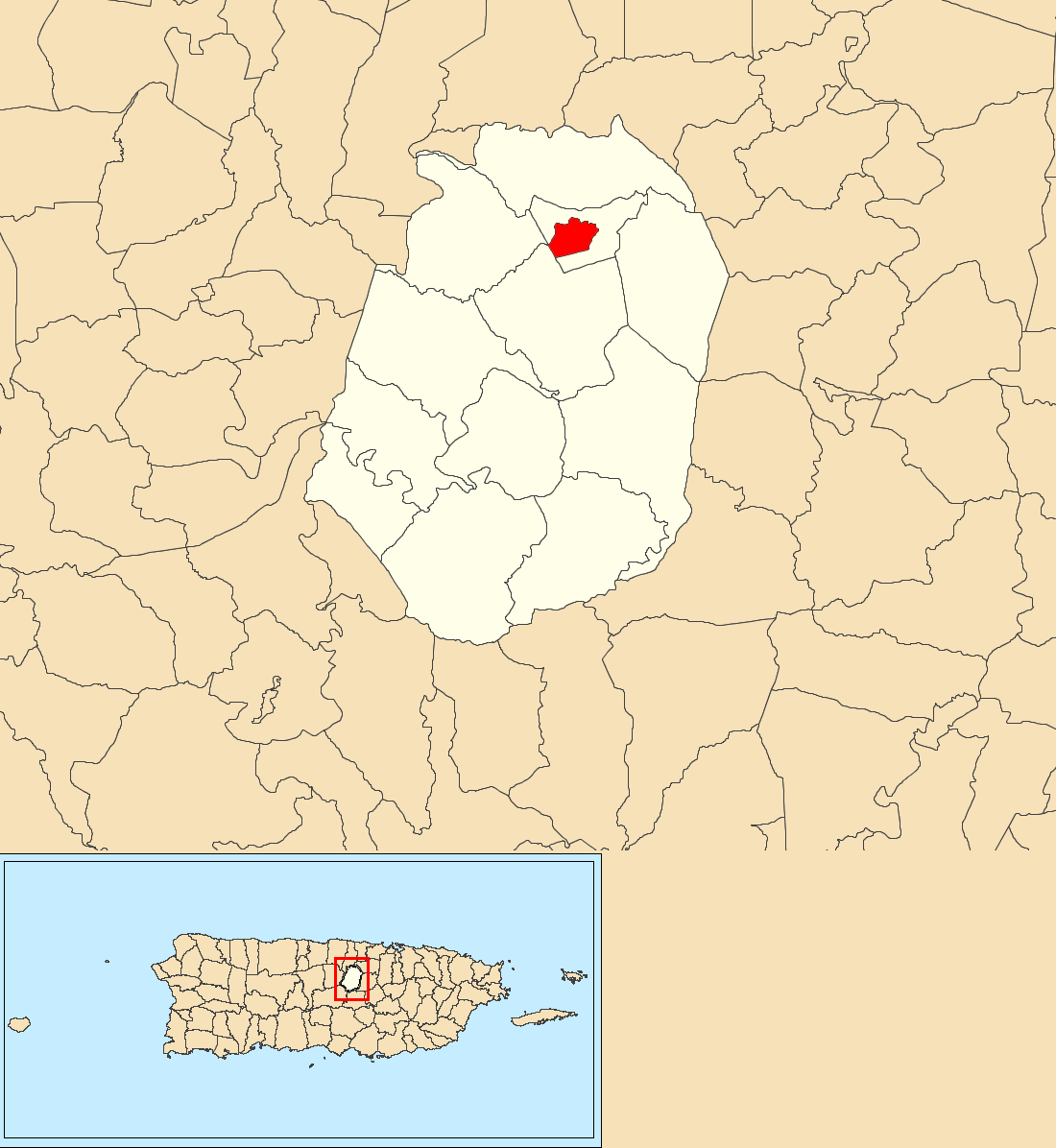
- Location of Corozal barrio-pueblo within the municipality of Corozal shown in red

- Location of Puerto Rico
- Coordinates: 18°20′23″N 66°19′00″W
- Commonwealth: Puerto Rico
- Municipality: Corozal

Area
  - Total: .352 sq mi (0.91 km^{2})
  - Land: .352 sq mi (0.91 km^{2})
  - Water: 0 sq mi (0 km^{2})
- Elevation: 262 ft (80 m)

Population (2010)
  - Total: 2,631
  - Density: 7,517.1/sq mi (2,902.4/km^{2})
- Source: 2010 Census
- Time zone: UTC−4 (AST)

Corozal barrio-pueblo is an urban barrio and the administrative center (seat) of Corozal, a municipality of Puerto Rico. Its population in 2010 was 2,631.

As was customary in Spain, in Puerto Rico, the municipality has a pueblo which contains a central plaza, the municipal buildings (city hall), and a Catholic church. Fiestas patronales (patron saint festivals) are held in the central plaza every year.

== History ==
Corozal barrio-pueblo was in Spain's gazetteers until Puerto Rico was ceded by Spain in the aftermath of the Spanish–American War under the terms of the Treaty of Paris of 1898 and became an unincorporated territory of the United States. In 1899, the United States Department of War conducted a census of Puerto Rico finding that the population of Corozal barrio-pueblo (Pueblo) was 1,057.

== Features and demographics ==
Corozal barrio-pueblo has .352 square miles (0.91 km^{2}) of land area and no water area. In 2010, its population was 2,631 with a population density of 7,517.1 inhabitants per square mile (2,902.4/km^{2}).

Historical population
Census	Pop.	Note	%±
1900	1,057		—
1910	1,301		23.1%
1920	1,747		34.3%
1930	2,451		40.3%
1940	2,974		21.3%
1950	2,428		−18.4%
1960	3,166		30.4%
1970	0		−100.0%
1980	1,663		—
1990	3,011		81.1%
2000	2,850		−5.3%
2010	2,631		−7.7%
U.S. Decennial Census; 1899 (shown as 1900) 1910-1930; 1930-1950 1980-2000 2010

== The central plaza and its church ==
The central plaza, or square, is a place for official and unofficial recreational events and a place where people can gather and socialize from dusk to dawn. The Laws of the Indies, Spanish law, which regulated life in Puerto Rico in the early 19th century, stated the plaza's purpose was for "the parties" (celebrations, festivities) (Spanish: a propósito para las fiestas), and that the square should be proportionally large enough for the number of neighbors (Spanish: grandeza proporcionada al número de vecinos). These Spanish regulations also stated that the streets nearby should be comfortable portals for passersby, protecting them from the elements: sun and rain.

Located across the central plaza in Corozal barrio-pueblo is the Parroquia La Sagrada Familia, a Roman Catholic church.

== Sectors ==
Barrios (which are, in contemporary times, roughly comparable to minor civil divisions) in turn are further subdivided into smaller local populated place areas/units called sectores (sectors in English). The types of sectores may vary, from normally sector to urbanización to reparto to barriada to residencial, among others.

The following sectors are in Corozal barrio-pueblo:

Barriada Aldea Vázquez, Barriada Bou, Calle Carmelo Aponte, Calle Cervantes, Calle Colegio Católico, Calle Culto, Calle Gándara, Calle Genaro Bou, Calle Howard T. Jason, Calle José Valiente, Calle La Marina, Calle Las Mercedes, Calle Nueva, Calle San Manuel, Calle Urbano Ramírez, Calle Santo Domingo, Calle Sostre, Calle San Ramón, Desvío Urbano, Extensión Sobrino, Residencial El Centro, Residencial Enrique Landrón, Sector Alcantarilla, Sector Alfonso Matos, Sector Cantera, Sector Portugués, Urbanización Sanfeliz, and Urbanización Sobrino.

== Gallery ==
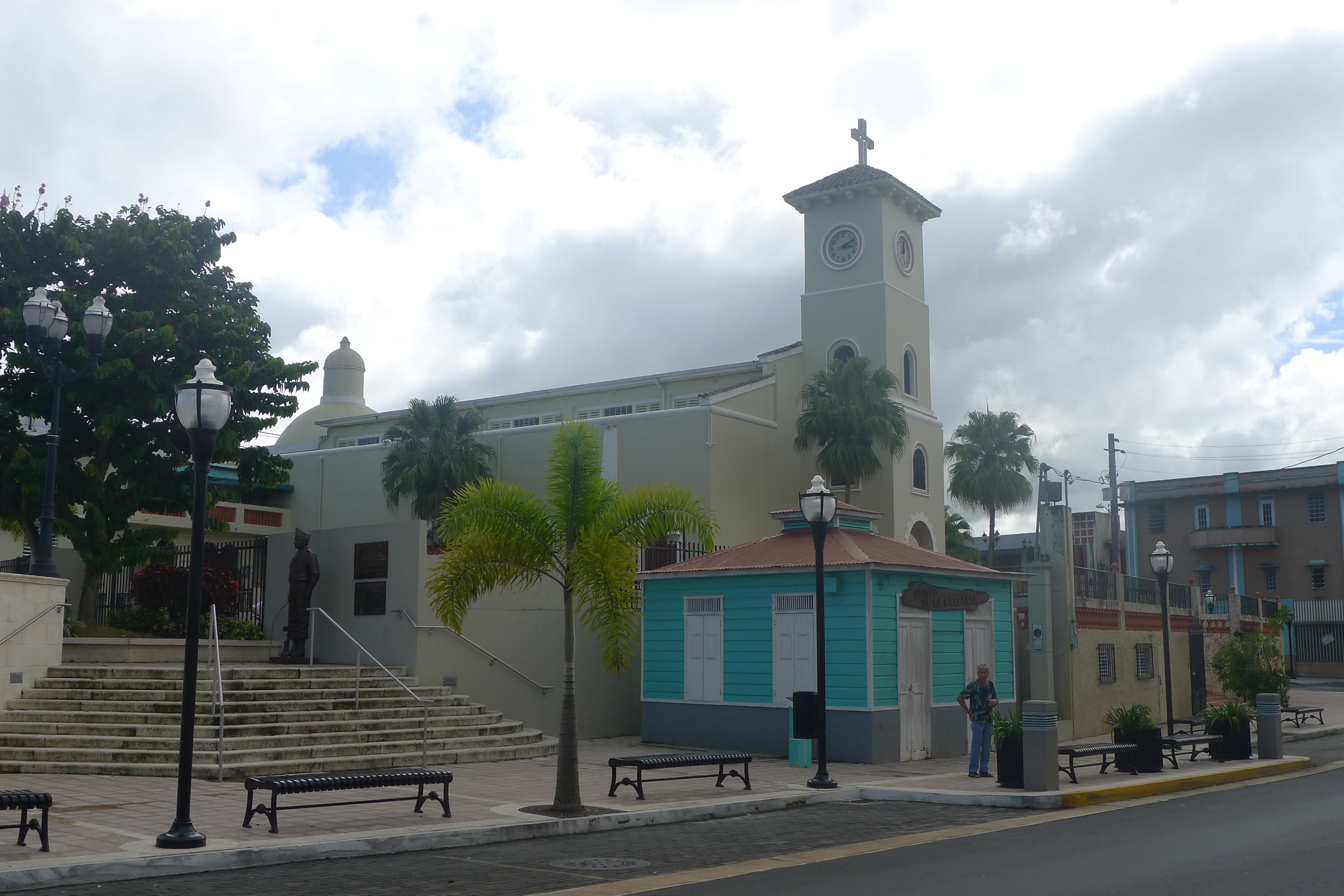
Central plaza or square in Corozal pueblo

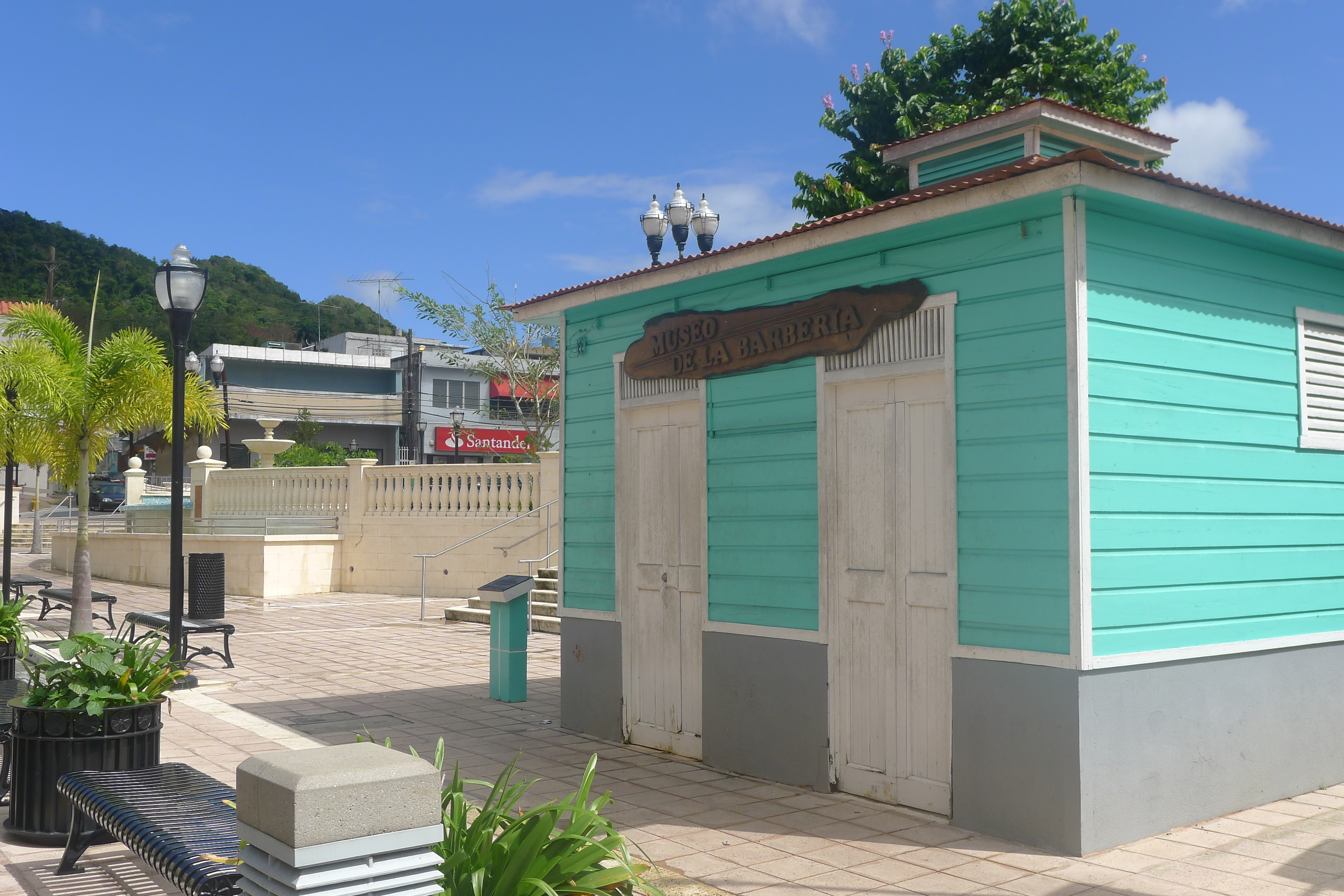
Museo de la Barbería Barber museum

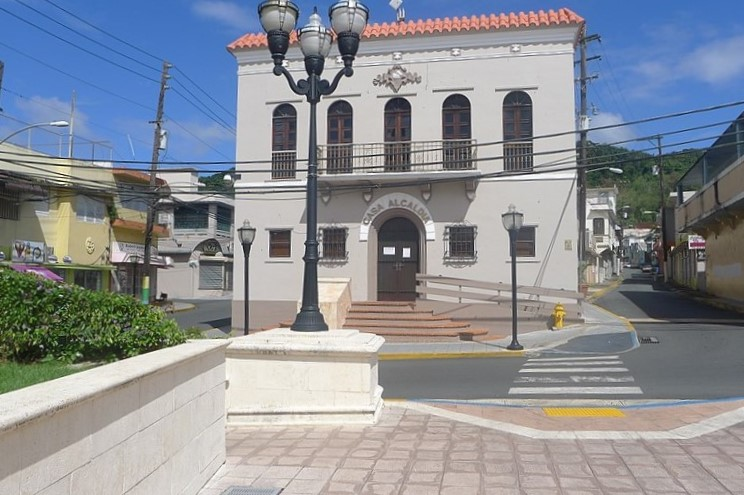
Town hall in Corozal, in front of central plaza

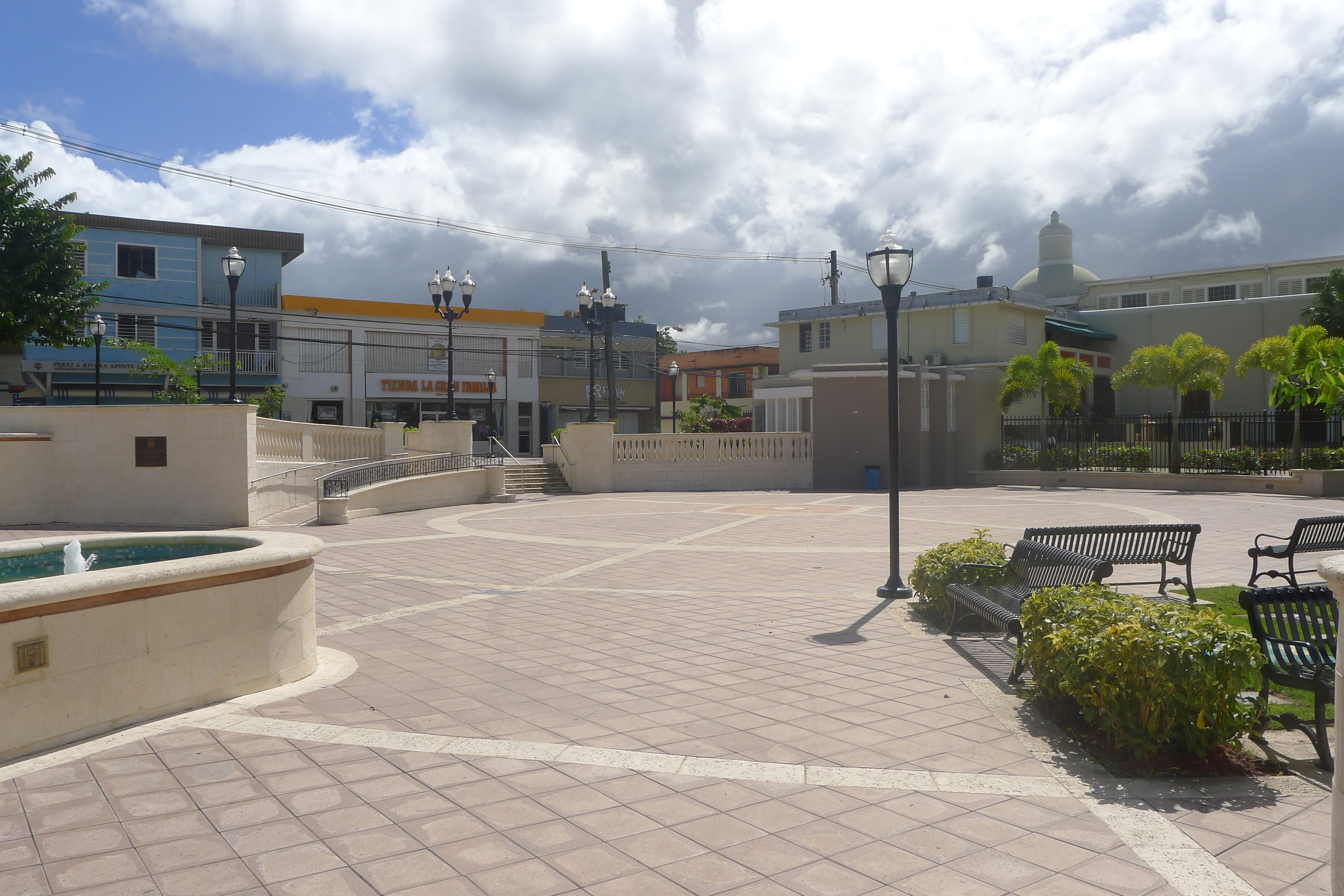
Square in Corozal pueblo

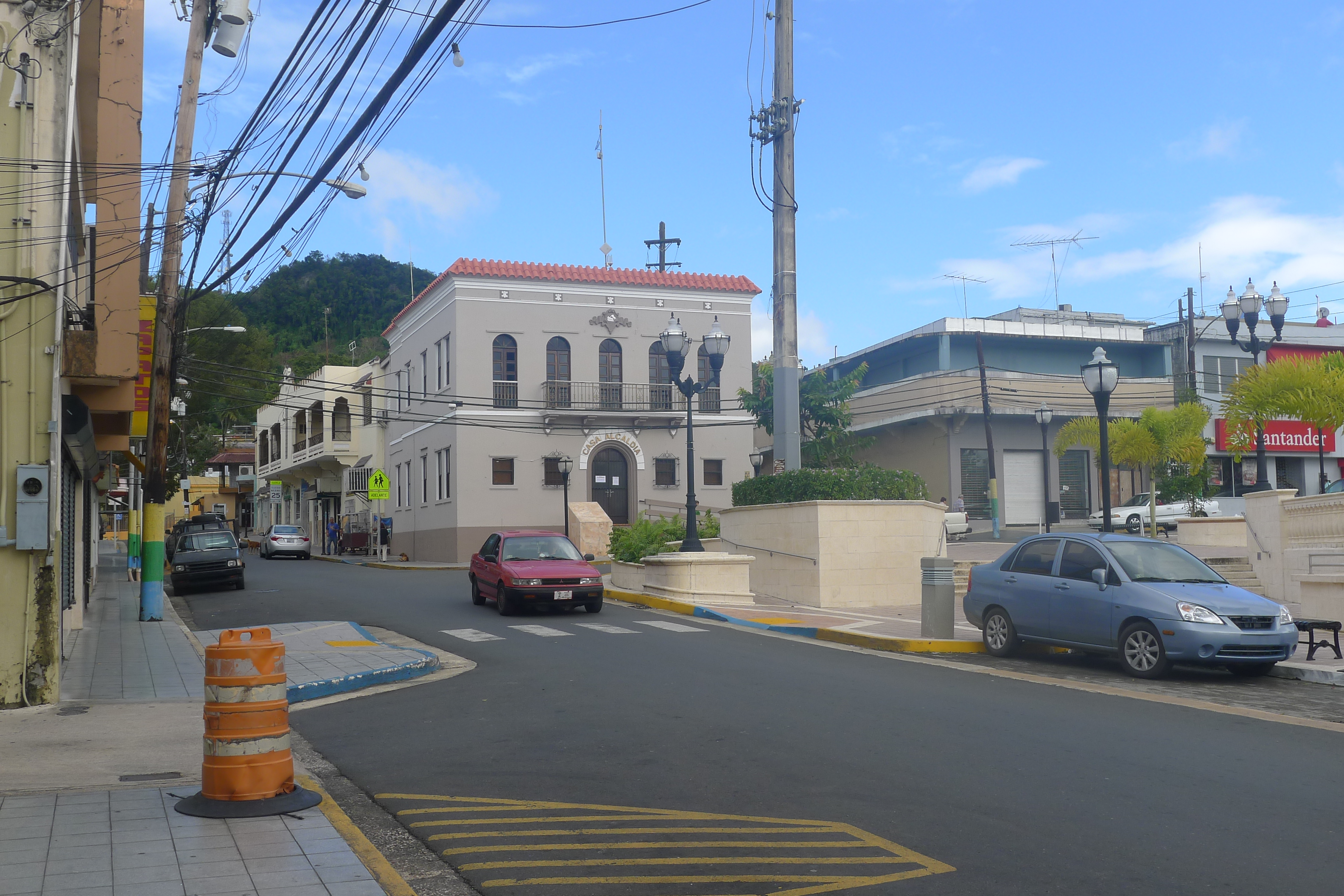
Buildings around the square

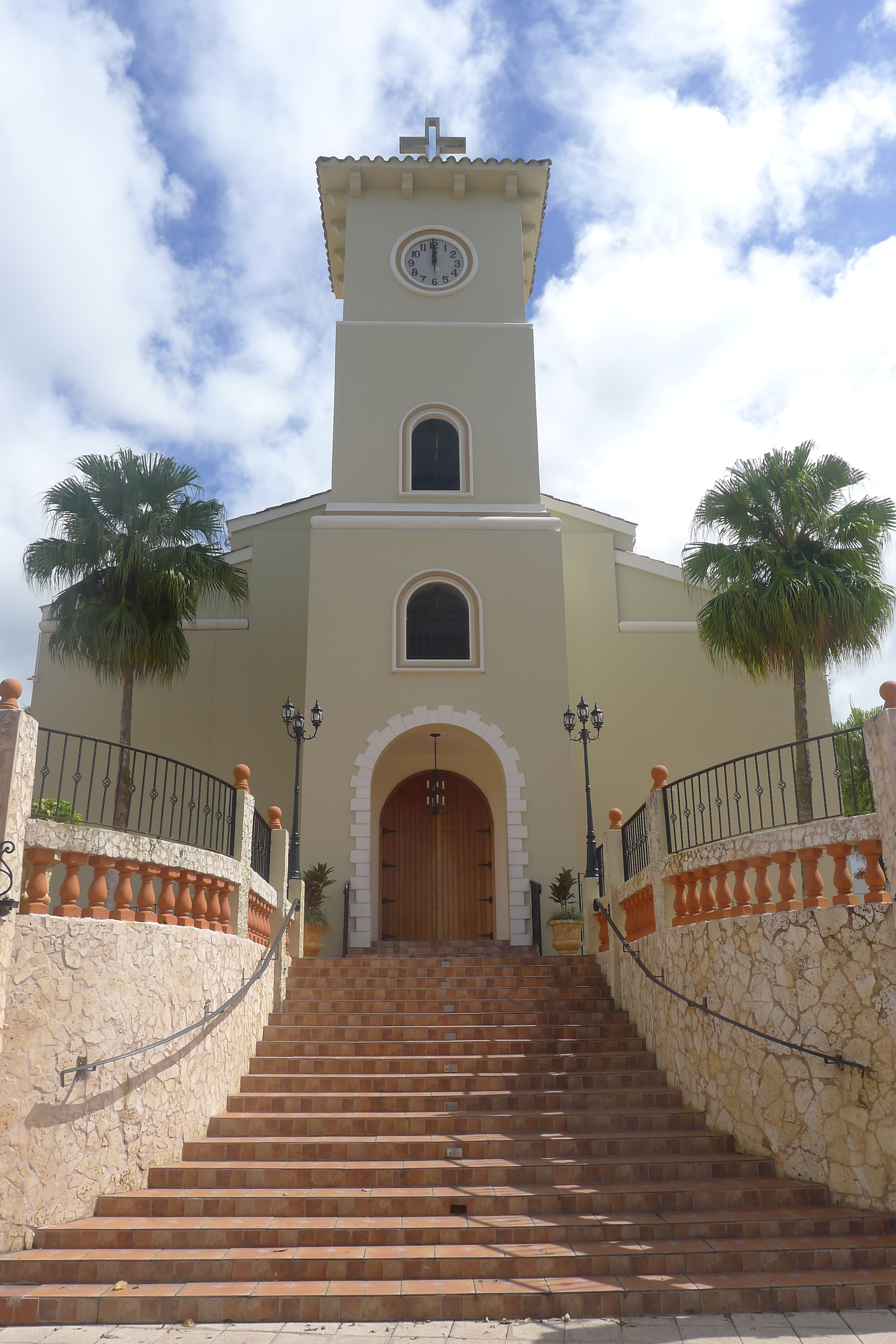
Parroquia La Sagrada Familia in Corozal pueblo

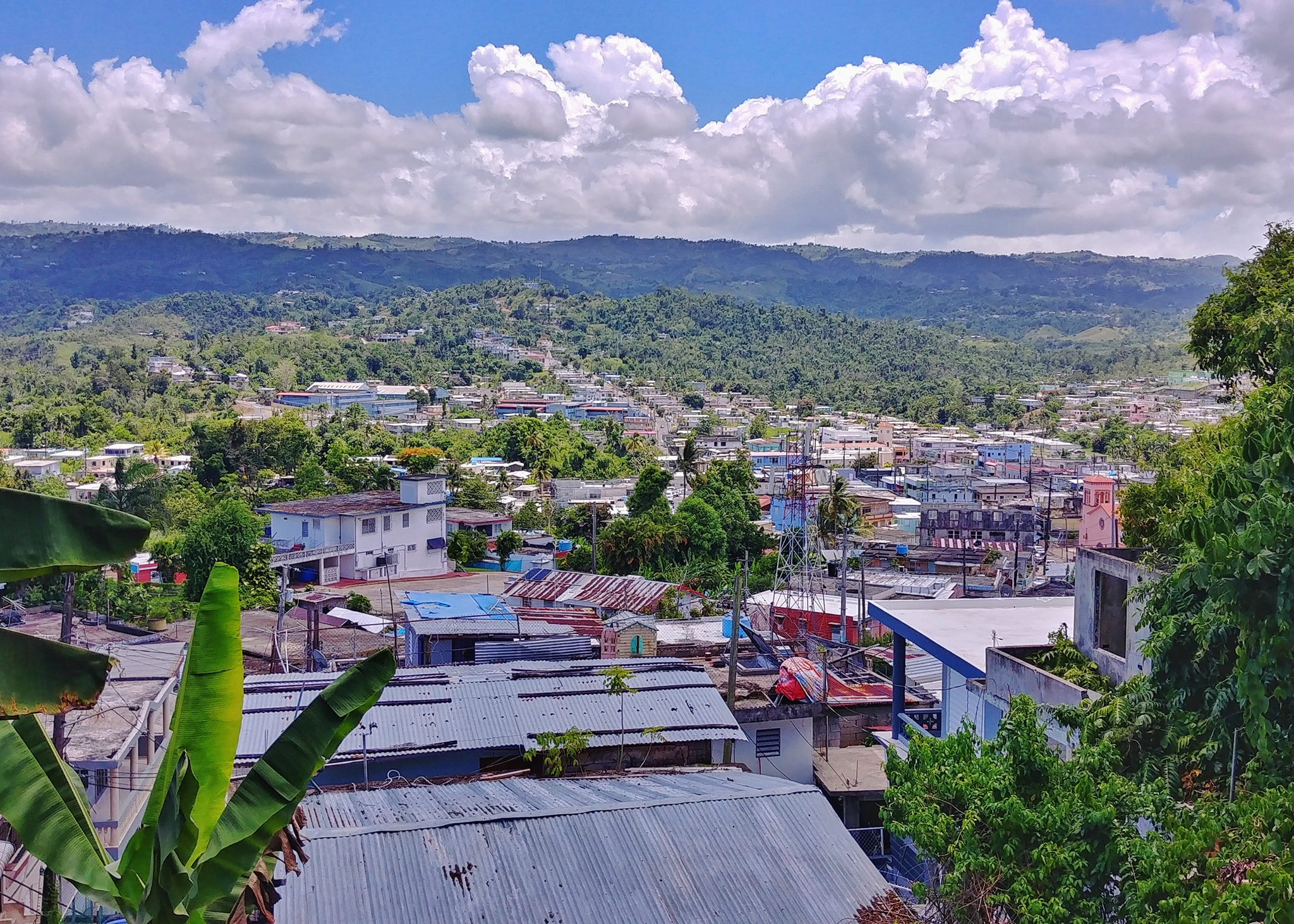
View of Corozal barrio-pueblo from Abras

== See also ==
- List of communities in Puerto Rico
- List of barrios and sectors of Corozal, Puerto Rico
