= Abras, Corozal, Puerto Rico =

Barrio of Puerto Rico

Abras
- Barrio
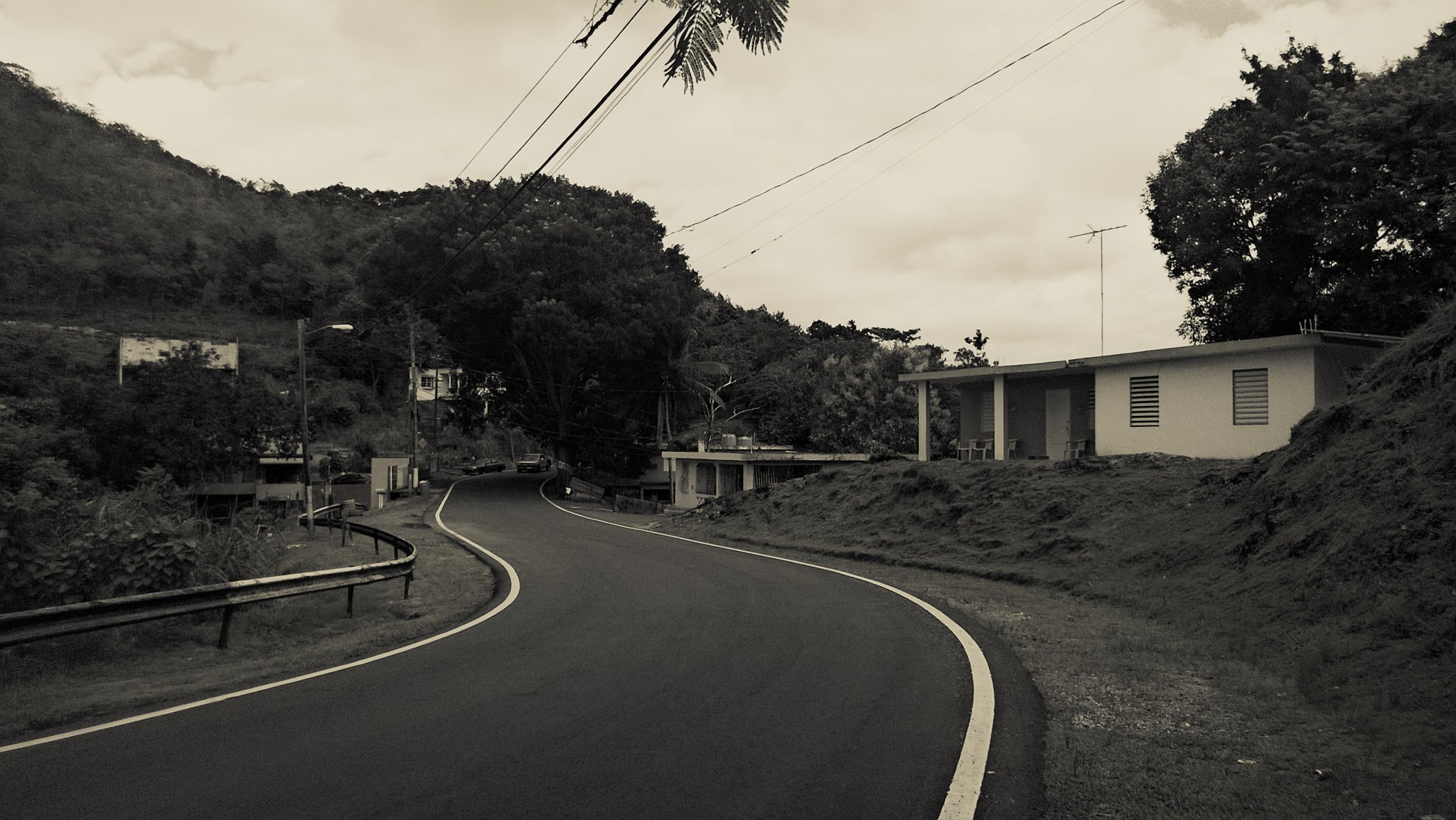
- Puerto Rico Highway 821 in Abras

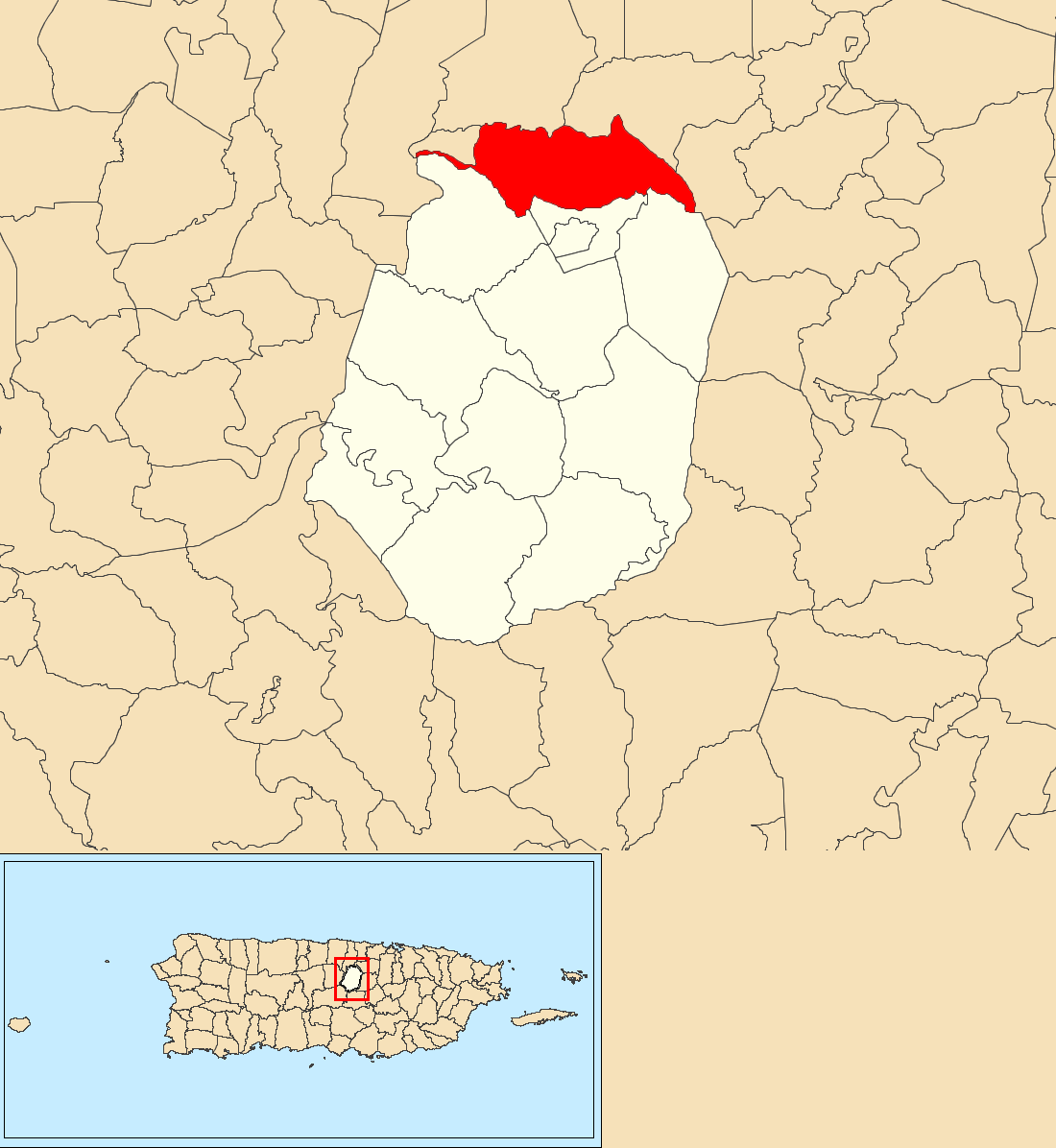
- Location of Abras within the municipality of Corozal shown in red

- Location of Puerto Rico
- Coordinates: 18°21′21″N 66°18′48″W
- Commonwealth: Puerto Rico
- Municipality: Corozal

Area
  - Total: 3.8 sq mi (9.8 km^{2})
  - Land: 3.8 sq mi (9.8 km^{2})
  - Water: 0 sq mi (0 km^{2})
- Elevation: 581 ft (177 m)

Population (2020)
  - Total: 2,077
  - Density: 595.3/sq mi (229.8/km^{2})
- Source: 2010 Census
- Time zone: UTC−4 (AST)

Abras is a rural barrio with a small urban area in the municipality of Corozal, Puerto Rico. Its population in 2010 was 2,262.

== History ==
Abras was in Spain's gazetteers until Puerto Rico was ceded by Spain in the aftermath of the Spanish–American War under the terms of the Treaty of Paris of 1898 and became an unincorporated territory of the United States. In 1899, the United States Department of War conducted a census of Puerto Rico finding that the population of Abras barrio was 1,183.

== Features and demographics ==
Abras has 3.8 square miles (9.8 km^{2}) of land area and no water area. In 2010, its population was 2,262 with a population density of 595.3 inhabitants per square mile (229.8/km^{2}).

Historical population
Census	Pop.	Note	%±
1900	1,183		—
1910	1,314		11.1%
1920	1,619		23.2%
1930	1,730		6.9%
1940	2,110		22.0%
1950	1,393		−34.0%
1960	1,039		−25.4%
1970	977		−6.0%
1980	1,208		23.6%
1990	1,634		35.3%
2000	1,984		21.4%
2010	2,262		14.0%
2020	2,077		−8.2%
U.S. Decennial Census; 1899 (shown as 1900) 1910-1930; 1930-1950 1980-2000 2010 2020

PR-821 is the main north-south road through Abras.

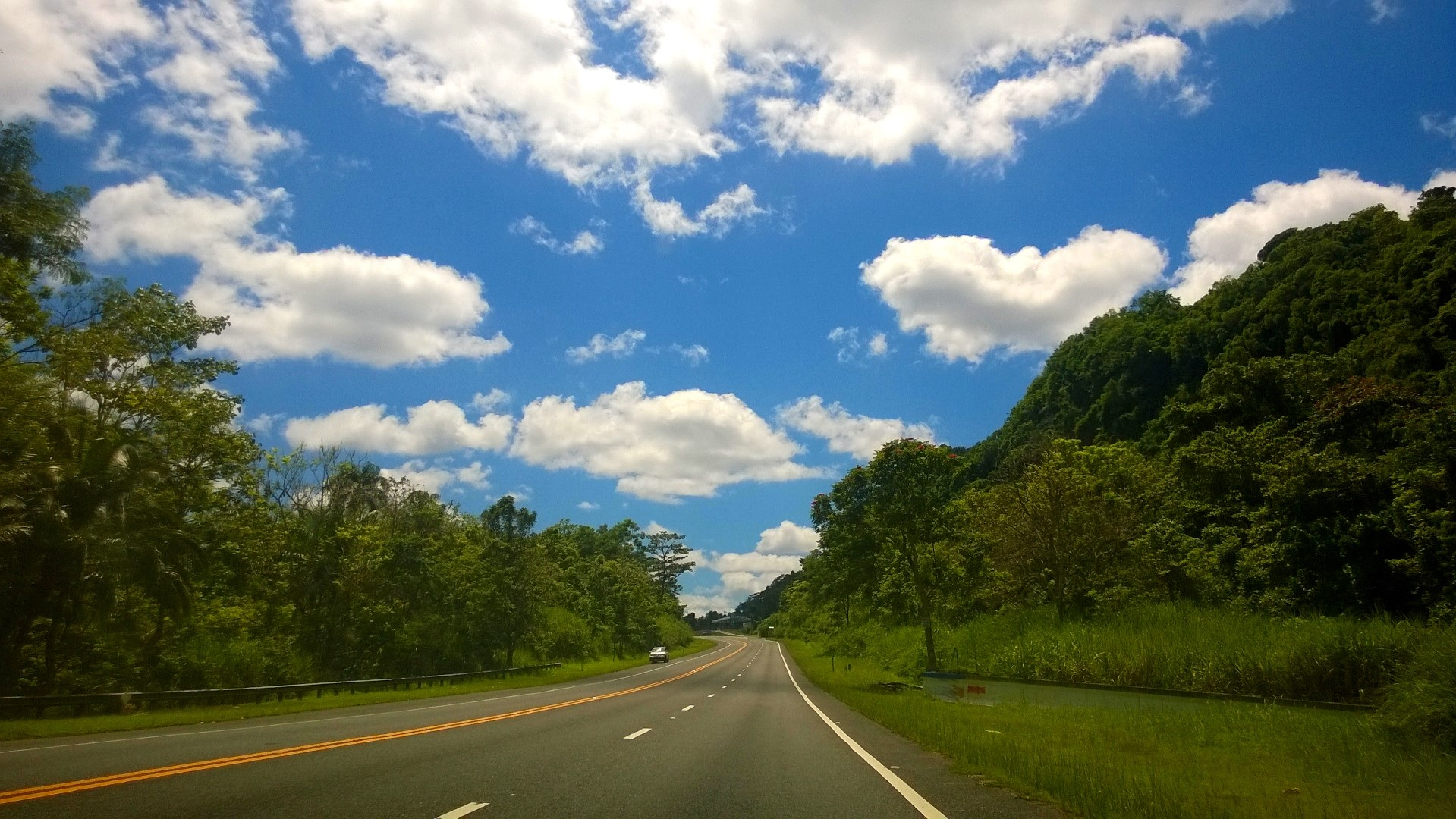
Puerto Rico Highway 142 in Abras

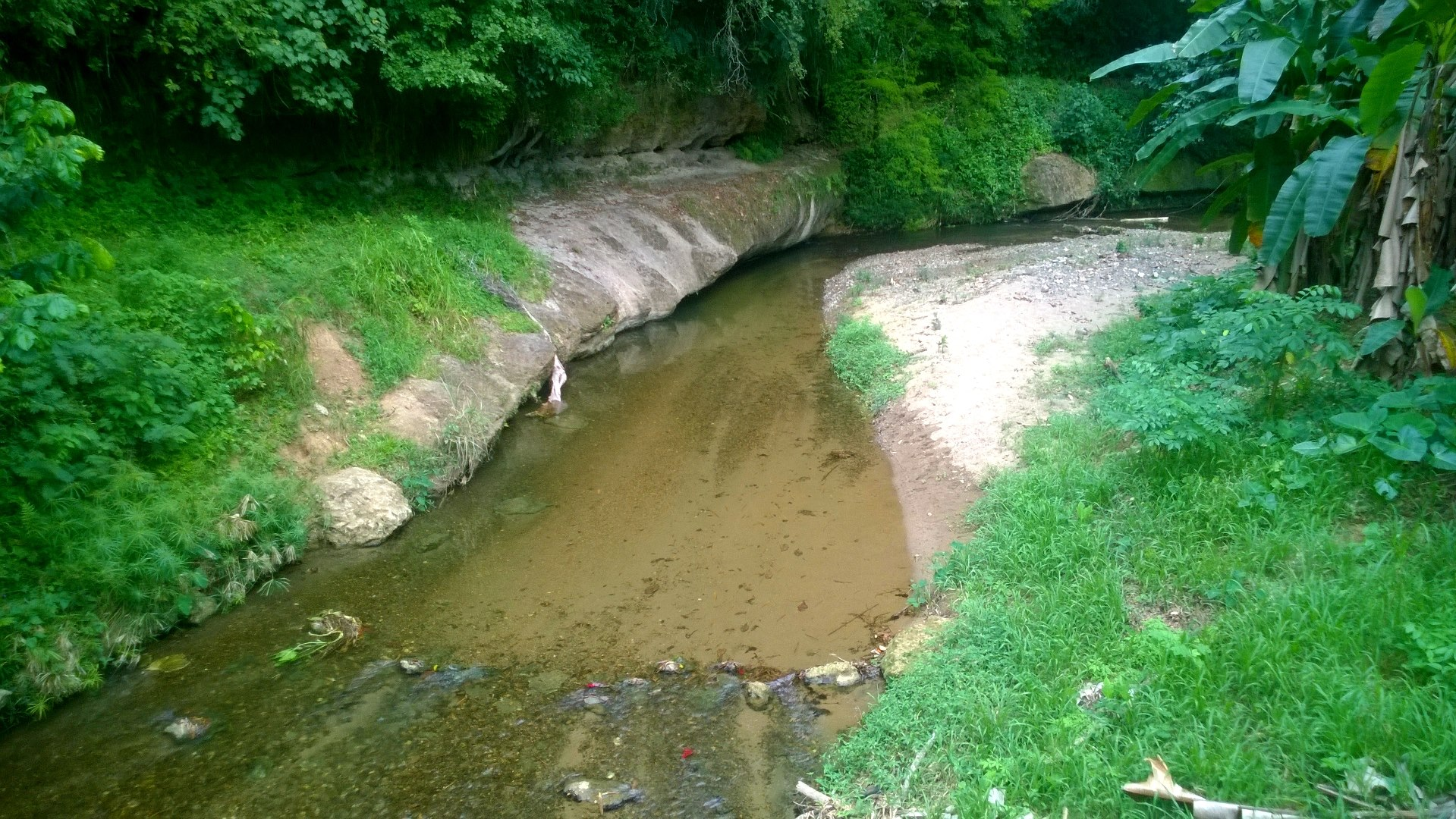
Mavilla River between Corozal and Vega Alta

== Mavilla Bridge ==
A bridge listed on the National Register of Historic Places in Puerto Rico is between Abras barrio and Palmarejo barrio, also in Corozal.

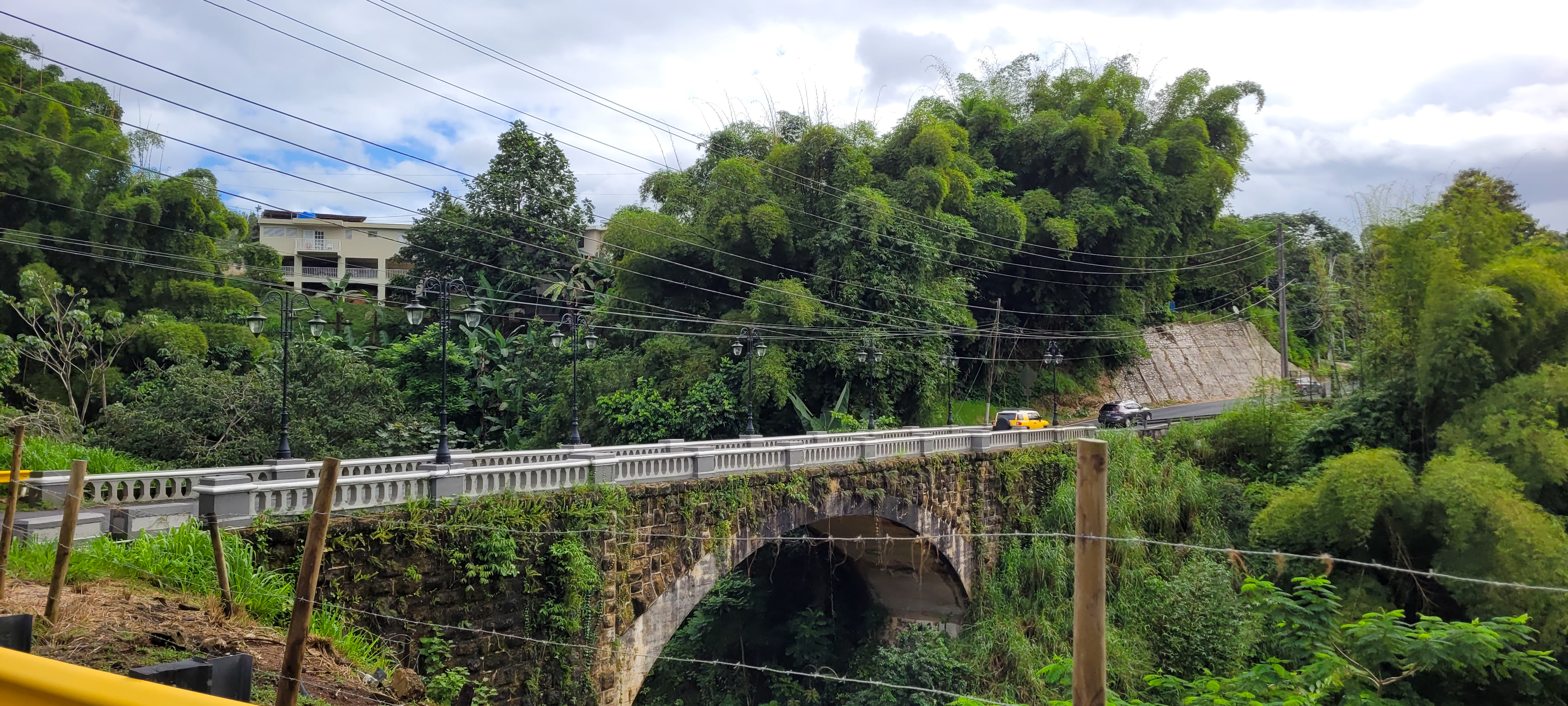
Mavilla Bridge (Ca. 2024)

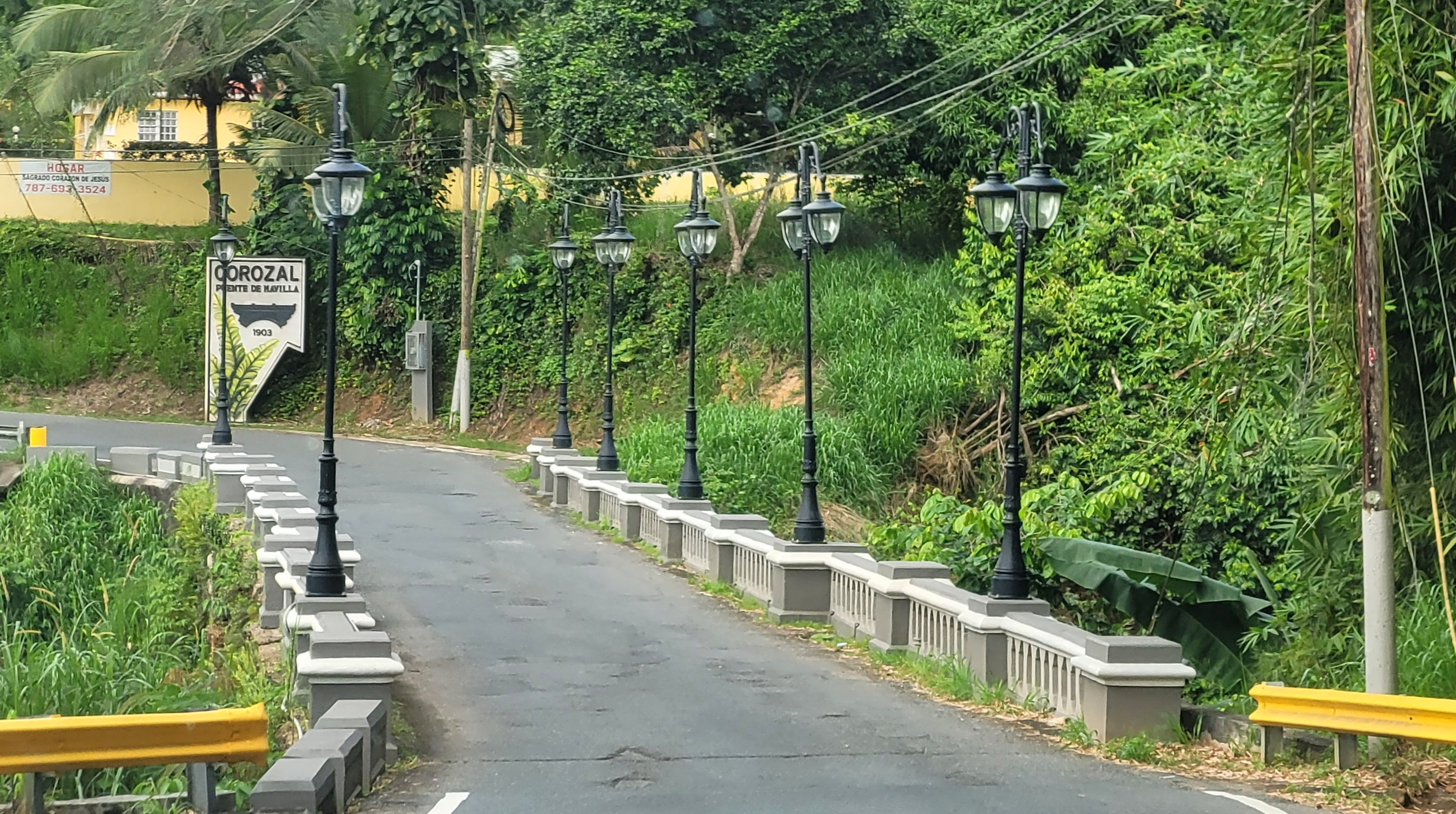
Mavilla Bridge looking west

== Sectors ==
Barrios (which are, in contemporary times, roughly comparable to minor civil divisions) in turn are further subdivided into smaller local populated place areas/units called sectores (sectors in English). The types of sectores may vary, from normally sector to urbanización to reparto to barriada to residencial, among others.

The following sectors are in Abras barrio:

=== Abras ===
Sector Cueva de Paca, Sector El Brillante, Sector Hoya Ranch, Sector La Alcoba, Sector La Calabaza, Sector La Pollera, Sector Los Ramos, Sector Los Torres, Sector Marcelo Rosado, Sector Parcelas, Sector Víctor Pantojas, Urbanización Vista del Río I, Urbanización Vista del Río II, and Urbanización Vista del Río III.

=== Abras Centro ===
Sector Carretera (from La Capilla to Sector Sandoval), Sector Chago Adorno, Sector Charol, Sector El Convento, Sector La Capilla, Sector La Escuelita, Sector Lorenzo Agosto, Sector Los Bruno, and Sector Sandoval.

=== Abras Mavilla ===
Sector Adolfa, Sector Balalaika, Sector El Batey, Sector Los Bruno, Sector Los Mudos, Sector Los Rolones, Sector Los Rosado, Sector Los Torres, Urbanización Jardines de Mavilla, Urbanización Las Brisas, Urbanización Quintas de Plaza Aquarium, and Urbanización San Rafael.

== See also ==
- List of communities in Puerto Rico
- List of barrios and sectors of Corozal, Puerto Rico
