= Puerto Rico Highway 647 =

Highway in Puerto Rico

Highway 647
- Ruta 647
- Carretera Palmira Cabrera de Ibarra

Route information
- Maintained by Puerto Rico DTPW
- Length: 12.8 km (8.0 mi)
- Existed: 1953–present

Major junctions
- South end: PR-159 / PR-5568 in Padilla–Cibuco
- PR-677 in Candelaria; PR-620 in Candelaria
- North end: PR-676 in Vega Alta barrio-pueblo

Location
- Country: United States
- Territory: Puerto Rico
- Municipalities: Corozal, Vega Alta

Highway system
- Roads in Puerto Rico; List
← PR-633	→ PR-679

Puerto Rico Highway 647 (PR-647) is a north–south road located between the municipalities of Corozal and Vega Alta in Puerto Rico. With a length of 12.8 km (8.0 mi), it extends from its junction with PR-159 and PR-5568 on the Cibuco–Padilla line in western Corozal, passing through Cienegueta, Candelaria and Bajura barrios until its end at PR-676 in downtown Vega Alta.

== Route description ==
Puerto Rico Highway 647 is mostly a rural road with one lane per direction for its entire length. In Corozal, it has a short length that extends from PR-159 and PR-5568 intersection to the Vega Alta municipal limit and is located entirely within Cibuco barrio. In Vega Alta, PR-647 has a long length, beginning from the Corozal municipal limit and ending at PR-676 in the city center. In this municipality, it crosses Cienegueta, Candelaria and Bajura barrios. PR-647 also crosses the Río Cibuco, and some portions of the Vega State Forest are located on this highway. On 17 March 2022, this road was renamed as Carretera Palmira Cabrera de Ibarra the in honor of the politician from Vega Alta.

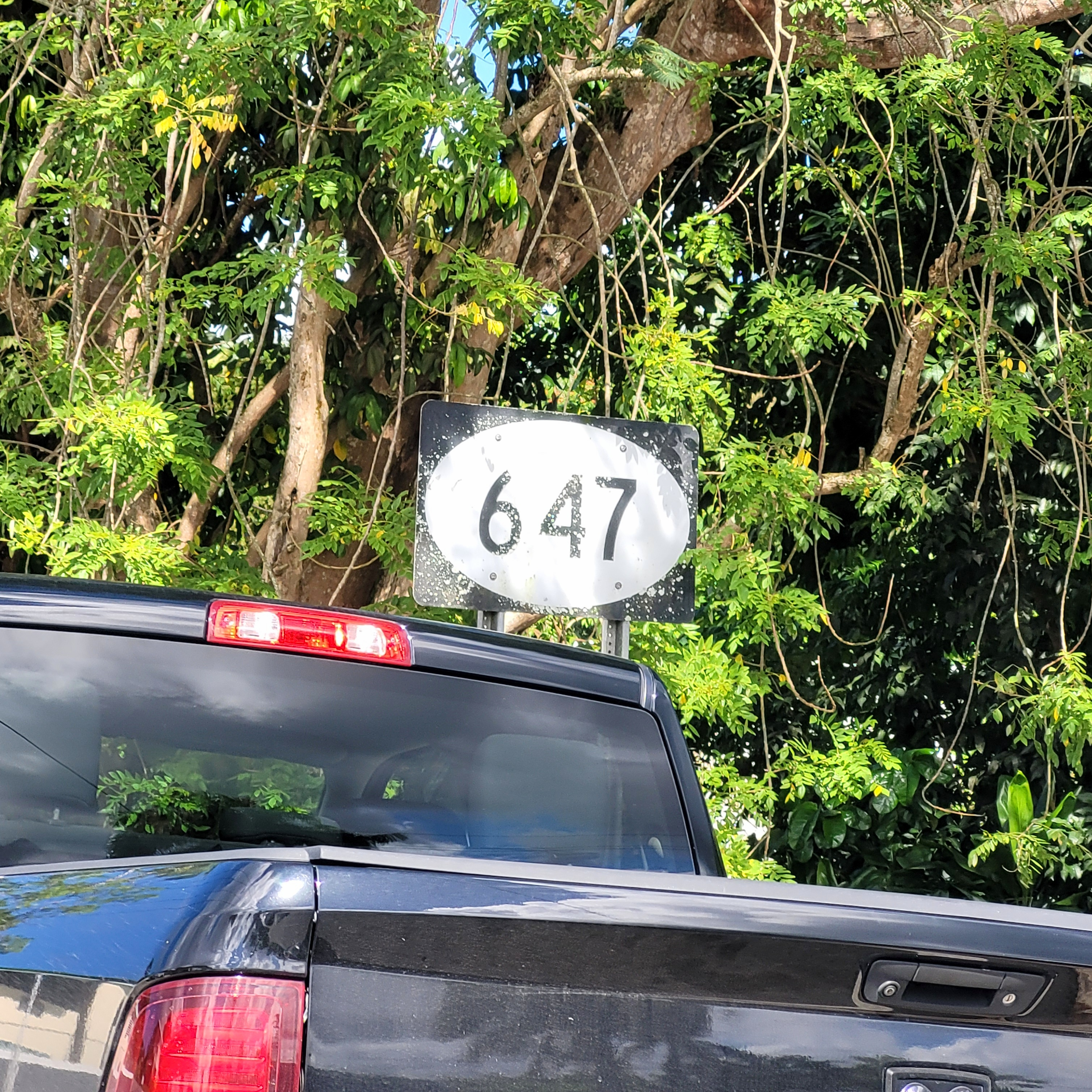
Sign for PR-647 in Cibuco, Corozal, heading north

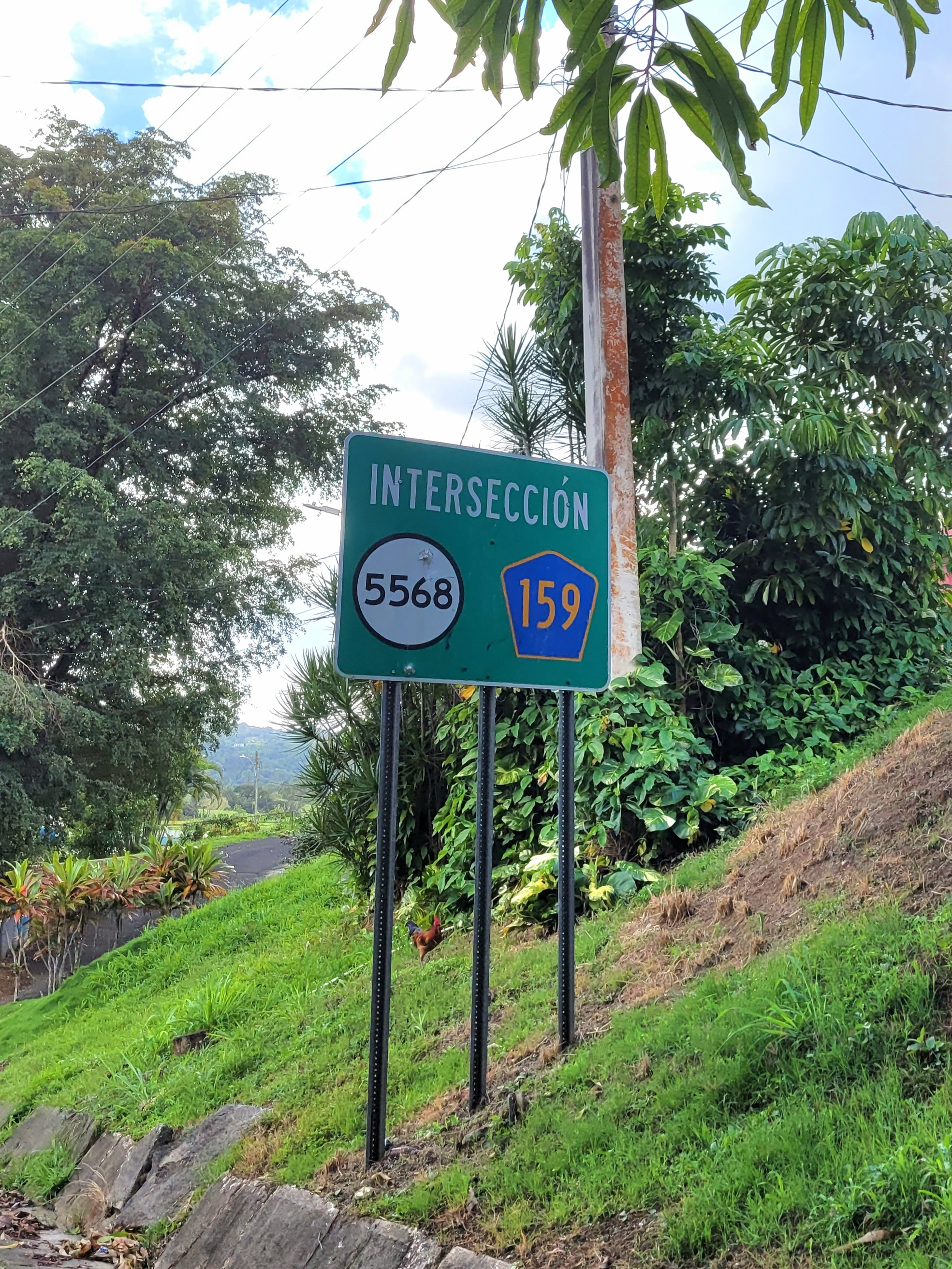
PR-647 south near PR-159 and PR-5568 junction in Cienegueta, Vega Alta

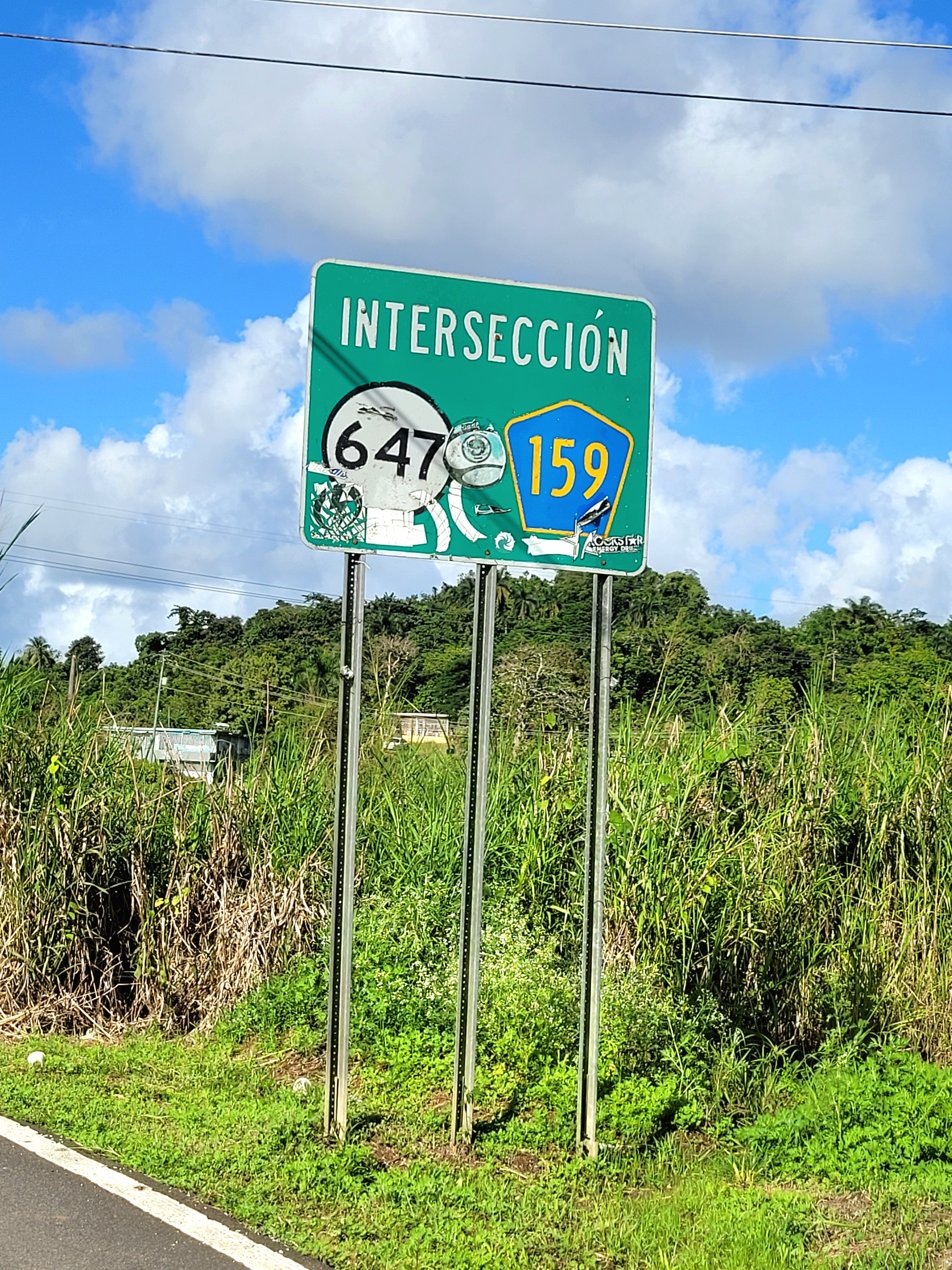
PR-5568 north near PR-159 and PR-647 junction in Padilla, Corozal

== History ==
Prior to its numerical designation, PR-647 was only known as Carretera de Candelaria. The current numerical designation corresponds to the 1953 Puerto Rico highway renumbering, a process implemented by the Puerto Rico Department of Transportation and Public Works (Spanish: Departamento de Transportación y Obras Públicas) that increased the insular highway network to connect existing routes with different locations around Puerto Rico.

== Major intersections ==
Municipality	Location	km	mi	Destinations	Notes
Corozal	Padilla–Cibuco line	0.0	0.0	PR-5568 – Padilla	Continuation beyond PR-159
Corozal	Padilla–Cibuco line	0.0	0.0	PR-159 – Corozal, Toa Alta, Morovis	Southern terminus of PR-647
Vega Alta	Candelaria	10.8	6.7	PR-677 – Maricao	
Vega Alta	Candelaria	10.9	6.8	PR-620 – Candelaria	
Vega Alta	Vega Alta barrio-pueblo	12.8	8.0	PR-676 – Vega Alta, Vega Baja	Northern terminus of PR-647
1.000 mi = 1.609 km; 1.000 km = 0.621 mi
