= Luisa Seijo =

Puerto Rican academic, activist and social worker

Luisa Rosario Seijo Maldonado
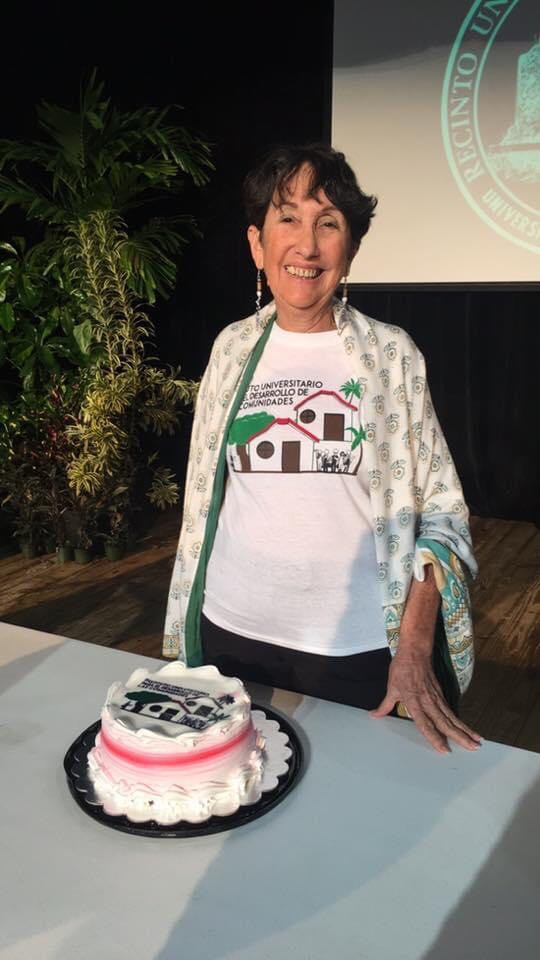
- Seijo Maldonado at the February 2019 UIDC Seminar
- Born: August 4, 1950 (age 76); Vega Alta, Puerto Rico
- Education: Catholic University of Puerto Rico (BA) (1970); University of Puerto Rico (MSW) (1972); PhD Complutense University of Madrid (ABD)
- Spouse: José Rosado
- Children: 4

Luisa Rosario Seijo Maldonado (born 4 August 1950) is a Puerto Rican academic, activist, and social worker.

== Early life and education ==
Luisa Rosario Seijo Maldonado was born to José Alejandro Seijo and Haydeé Maldonado Vega on 4 August 1959 in Vega Alta, Puerto Rico. They were both heavily involved in the founding of the Vega Coop credit union. Her father was a founding partner, along with some other relatives, and her mother became part of its first educational committee. Seijo's first encounter with community work was through a Catholic Action group when she was fifteen. With her parents she visited the community of Rapaurra in Candelaria, Vega Alta. The program, called "One Great Family" consisted of her parents working with the adults, while Seijo took care of the children. She is a great-great granddaughter of her hometown's three-time co-mayor, Jacinto Seijo.

In 1970 Seijo graduated, after three years, with a Double bachelor's degree in Sociology and Social Work from the Catholic University of Puerto Rico in Ponce, Puerto Rico. During her time there she became the first person from the bachelor's program to do their practice at the service center in La Playa, Ponce just after it was opened by Sor Isolina Ferré in 1968. This was followed by a Master's in Social Work from the University of Puerto Rico two years later, which she finished in one year.

== Career and research ==
Seijo has founded eight organizations in Puerto Rico. She worked at the Puerto Rico Administration of Mental Health and Anti-Addiction Services between 1973–1978. She has worked in academia since 1983, when she started teaching at the Central University of Bayamón.

One of her main projects, SIEMPREVIVAS, founded in September 1997, offers counseling to female survivors of gender-based and domestic violence. The program centers around support groups for the women and workshops for their children. Seijo commenced the project at the University of Puerto Rico, Mayagüez Campus after a friend of hers, her friend's two daughters, their grandmother, and her godfather, were murdered by her friend's husband. The program extends over seven municipalities across the western-side of Puerto Rico.

In February 2003 she founded the University Institute for Community Development (UICD), which has impacted over 75 communities around the archipelago of Puerto Rico with the aid of 13 professors and 150-200 students from over 20 disciplines from the arts and sciences. This is done through the participatory action research method, which consists of going to disadvantaged communities close to where students live and work with the residents to increase their quality of life. An example of this is the design and construction of a community-owned aqueduct in Maizales, Naguabo. These experiences not only aid students in forming themselves, but also in preparing them for adult life as well as it being noted in their transcript as an investigation course. Through the UICD, Seijo collaborated with students from the Lyle School of Civil Engineering at Purdue, through their EPICS program, to develop a new community water system in Humatas, Añasco. The involvement of engineers also ranges from "nutritional and agricultural programs" to "support to [the] elderly and children organizations." After Hurricane María, the Institute received a grant from the Puerto Rico Relief Fund of South Central Wisconsin to make the community of Guayabota, Yabucoa sustainable in terms of food, electric power and plumbing. After the Hurricane, so many material donations came in that she had to store them in her office.

Seijo is currently an assistant professor at the Social Sciences Department of the University of Puerto Rico Mayagüez (UPRM), where she has worked for the past two decades, as of April 2020, as well as being an activist for the past forty years. Her research is focused on gender issues, such as gender-based violence, and community-based movements. Seijo has obtained more than a $1 million of funding from federal grants. Additionally, she is the UPRM's Coordinator for the Gender-Based Violence Prevention Program.

When visiting faculty and students from the Jonathan M. Tisch College of Civic Life's Scholars Program came to Puerto Rico in early 2014, Seijo prepared meetings and activities so they could learn about the struggles of Puerto Rican communities in the west-side of the island. Junior Chamber International hosted a panel title "Women of Impact" at the Puerto Rico Capitol in which Seijo recounted how she had decided to fight for women's rights when she lost a close friend, the friend's children and their grandmother to a crime of gender-based violence. She was invited again to the Capitol by the Interamerican University of Puerto Rico to give a speech on the impact communities have on the development of Puerto Rico. In 2015, the UPRM hosted the Eleventh Annual Conference on Sexual Assault: Promoting Collaborations between Universities and Communities, in which she was a member in a panel about pioneering university projects focused on violence against women.

At the 2018 SOMOS Puerto Rico Conference, she was part of a panel on "The Grassroots Nonprofit Sector: A Vehicle for Change & Opportunity in Puerto Rico." On November of the same year she led the silent "March for Peace and Equity", commemorating the women that had been killed as a result of gender-based violence in the preceding eleven months.

In April 2019 she was invited as a speaker on "Civic Sector Engagement in Recovery" at the In Pursuit of Puerto Rican Studies Research Summit of the Centro de Estudios Puertorriqueños held at the University of Central Florida. Later, that November, she was speaker at the University of Albany's RISE 2019 conference on the role of universities in disaster relief.

In 2020 Seijo was granted the National Sexual Violence Resource Center Visionary Voice Award by the Puerto Rico sexual assault coalition, Coordinadora Paz para la Mujer.

External video
- You can view the presentation of the 2020 Visionary Voice Award to Seijo on Facebook

All her projects are collaborations, and her support even extends to lending use of her own office for other causes, as was the case with a food and water collection run by the Adventist Development and Relief Agency (ADRA) and Tau Beta Pi (ΤΒΠ) in 2011.

Seijo has collaborated with two of her children. Her oldest son, an artist, aided with members of the community and the UICD, painted over 100 buildings in El Cerro, Naranjito. This ongoing work was partially supported by the Robert Rauschenberg Foundation. Her daughter works with the Conservation Trust of Puerto Rico, as supervisor of various vivariums, including José Ramon Fernández's NRHP Hacienda La Esperanza and leading the Para La Naturaleza's campaign to plant 750,000 trees in a period of seven years, as well as being the Treasurer of Puerto Rico's first agricultural trust.
