= Ladislao Martínez =

Puerto Rican musician

- Also known as: "El Maestro Ladí"
- Born: Ladislao Martínez Otero; June 27, 1898; Vega Alta, Puerto Rico
- Died: February 1, 1979 (aged 80) San Juan, Puerto Rico
- Genres: Puerto Rican folkloric music
- Occupations: Musician and Master cuatro player
- Instrument: cuatro

Ladislao "Ladí" Martínez Otero, a.k.a. "El Maestro Ladí" (June 27, 1898 – February 1, 1979), was a master cuatro musician. He became the first Puerto Rican to play a cuatro solo on the radio.

== Early years ==
Martínez was born in the barrio Espinosa of the town of Vega Alta, Puerto Rico. He was born into a humble family of farmers. As a child, together with his brother Encarnación, he became interested in playing the guitar. He later became interested in the cuatro, a four-stringed musical instrument related to the guitar family. His early teachers were Joaquín "La Paloma" Gandía and Carlos Soriano. At first Martínez, who lived with his parents, played his instrument at local parties and dances, earning anywhere from US$1.50–2.00 for each dance that he performed in.

== Musical career ==
External audio
- You may listen to Martínez's "El Gallo, La Gallina y La Guinea" on YouTube.

In 1921, Martínez and his brother moved to San Juan, the capital city of Puerto Rico. In San Juan, Martínez and his brother recruited the famed güiro player Patricio "Toribio" Rijos Morales, and together they founded the musical group Trío Ladí.

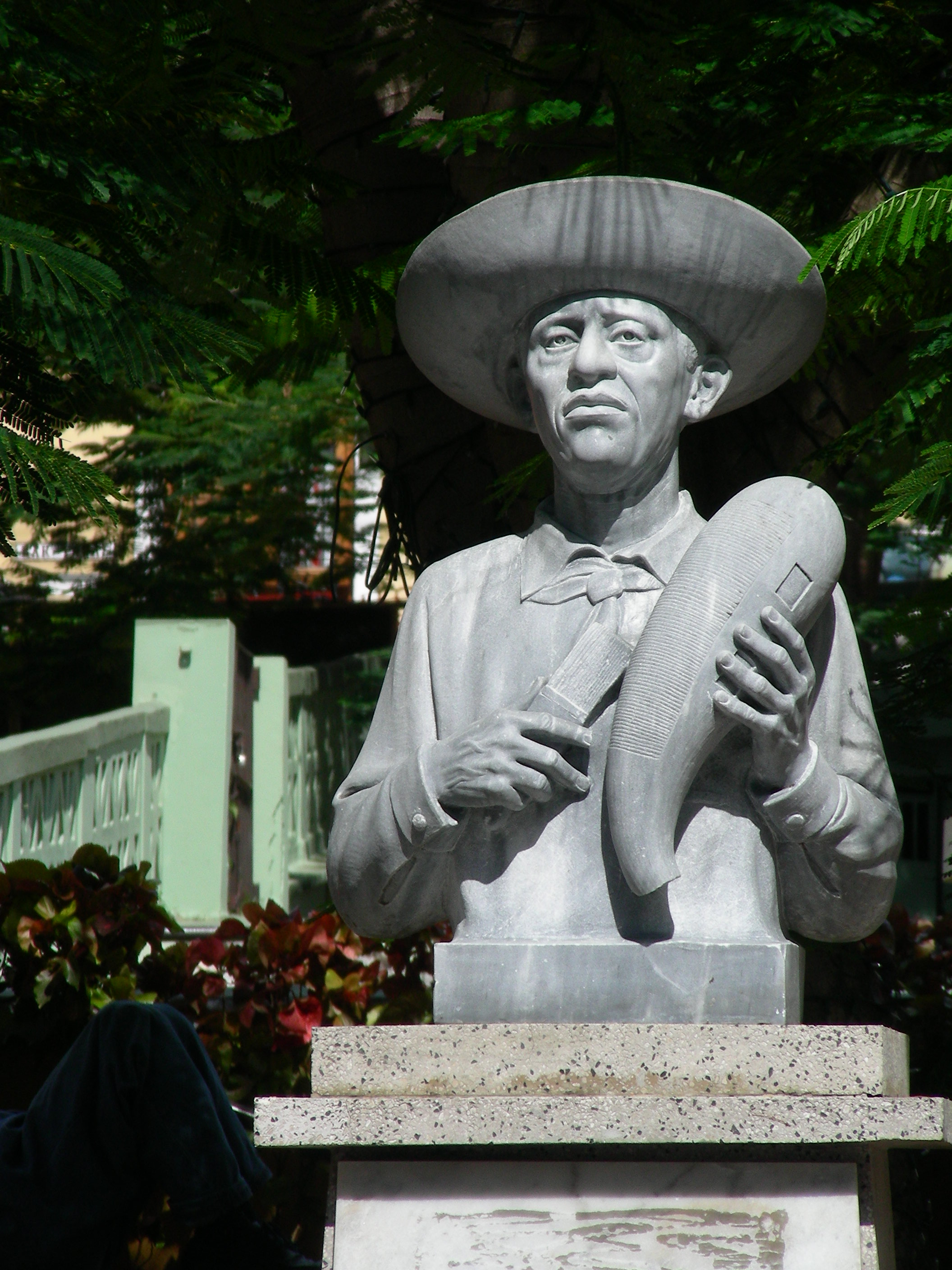
Statue of Patricio Rijos

In 1922, Puerto Rican radio station WKAQ inaugurated its radio transmission in the island with a program called Industrias Nativas (Native Industries), and Martínez and his trio were participants. It was the first time in Puerto Rican history that the radio listening public was to hear a cuatro via the airwaves. Martínez met many established musicians of the time, among them Felipe "Don Felo" Rosario Goyco, Ernestico, and Leocadio Vizcarrondo Delgado. Rosario and Vizcarrondo joined Martínez and named their group Aurora. It was during this time that Martínez began to record his compositions and those written by others. He wrote over four hundred musical compositions including boleros, danzas, guarachas, waltzes, zambas and polkas.

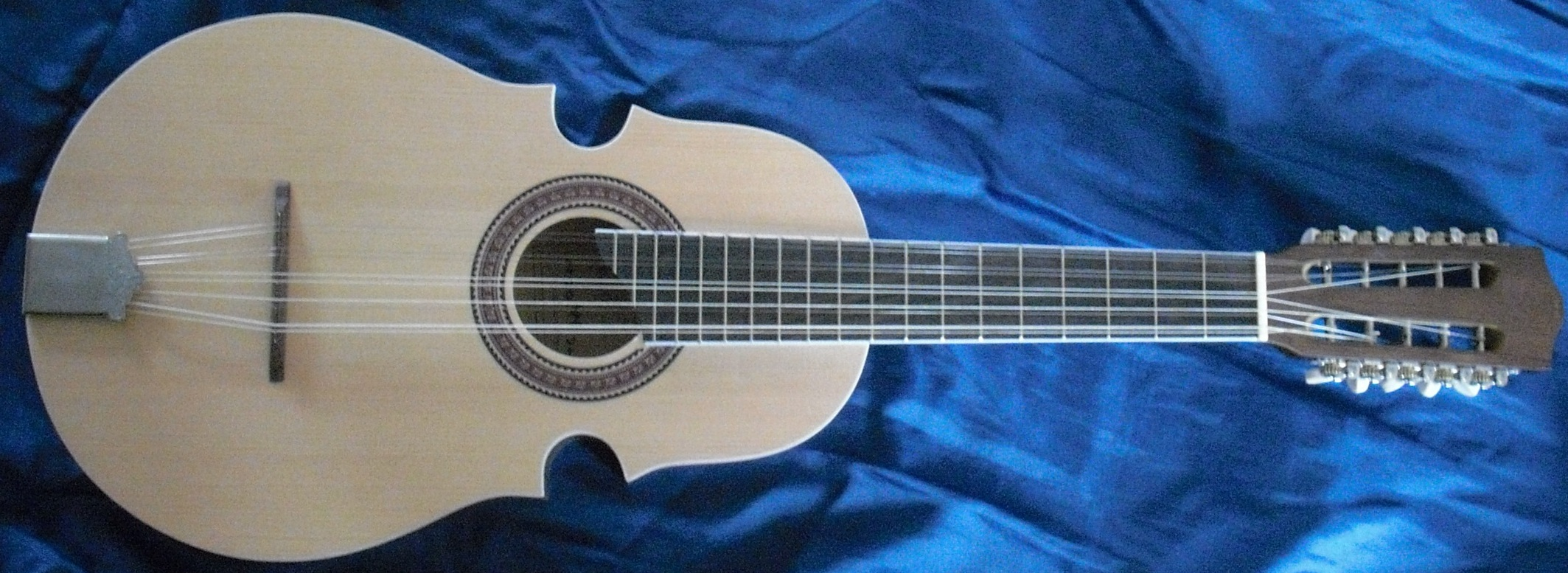
A Puerto Rican Cuatro

In 1934, Martínez and the members of Aurora had two radio programs, Jíbaros de la Radio (Country Folk of the Radio) and Industrias Nativas. They rename their group Conjunto Industrias Nativas and among the singers who performed with them was Jesús Sánchez Erazo, better known as Chuíto el de Bayamón and Tito Rodríguez who as a 13-year-old joined the group in 1936. In the later part of the 1930s, Martínez renamed his group and they became known as Conjunto Típico Ladí. Among the songs which they recorded were the following: En mi Carro te Espero; Alma Boricua; Linda Serrana; Noche de Algodón and El Seis Dorado.

== New York City ==
Martínez moved to New York City in 1945. In New York he continued to perform with his group Conjunto Típico Ladí and recorded over a hundred and fifty songs released on the RCA, Vergne and Sol De Borinquen labels, with songs such as the bolero, Tentación de Besarte. He also had a radio program La Voz Hispana del Aire which aired in New York.

== Later years ==
Martínez returned to Puerto Rico in 1965, after residing in New York for 16 years. He continued to perform with his group Conjunto Típico until February 1, 1979, the day that he died in the city of San Juan.

== Legacy ==
After his death, musicians Sarrail Archilla and Polo Ocasio continued to honor Martínez's legacy by keeping the Conjunto Ladí active. The Institute of Puerto Rican Culture also released a recording of Martínez's music including his famous mazurka, Aurora. His hometown honored his memory by naming a high school after him.

== See also ==
- List of Puerto Ricans
