= Mavilla, Vega Alta, Puerto Rico =

Barrio of Puerto Rico

Mavilla
- Barrio
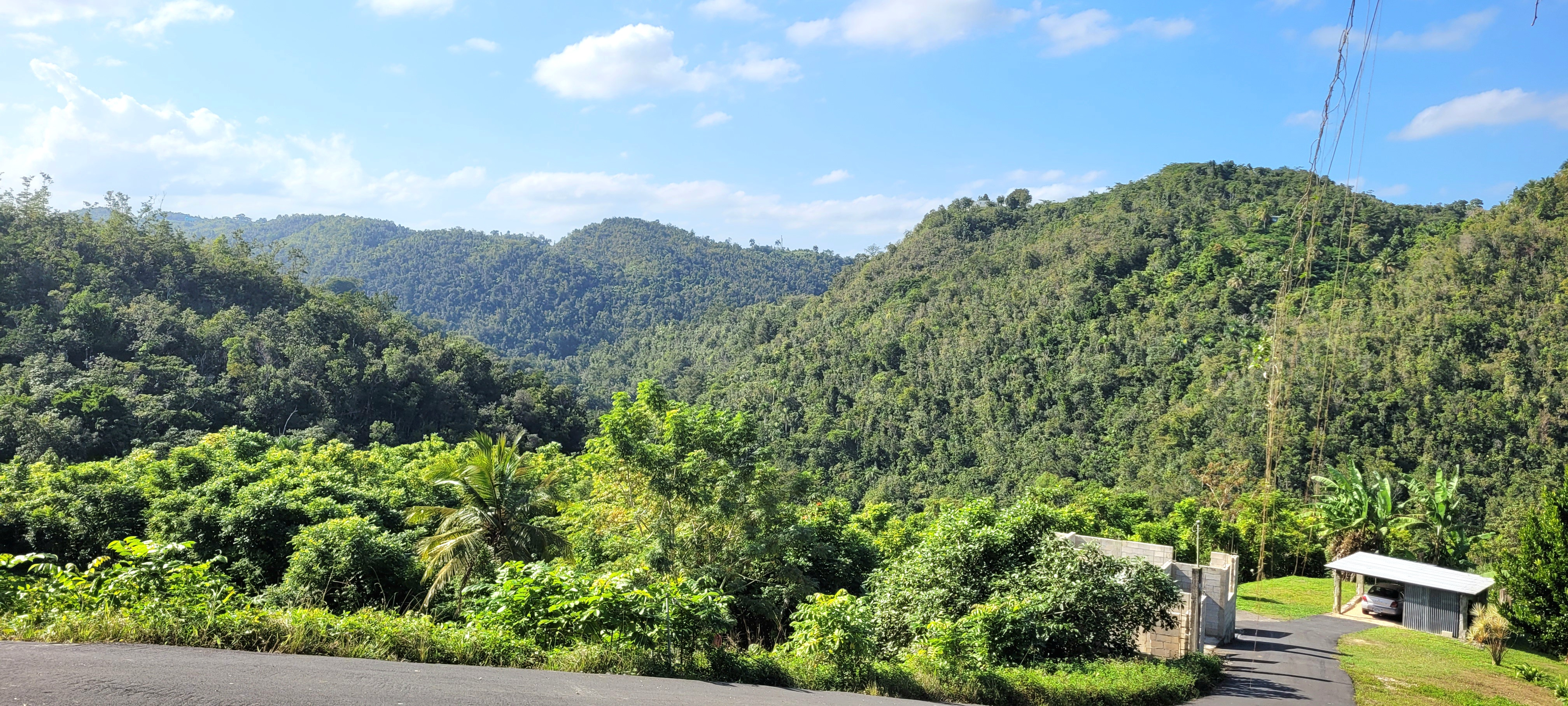
- View of karst mountains from Mavilla

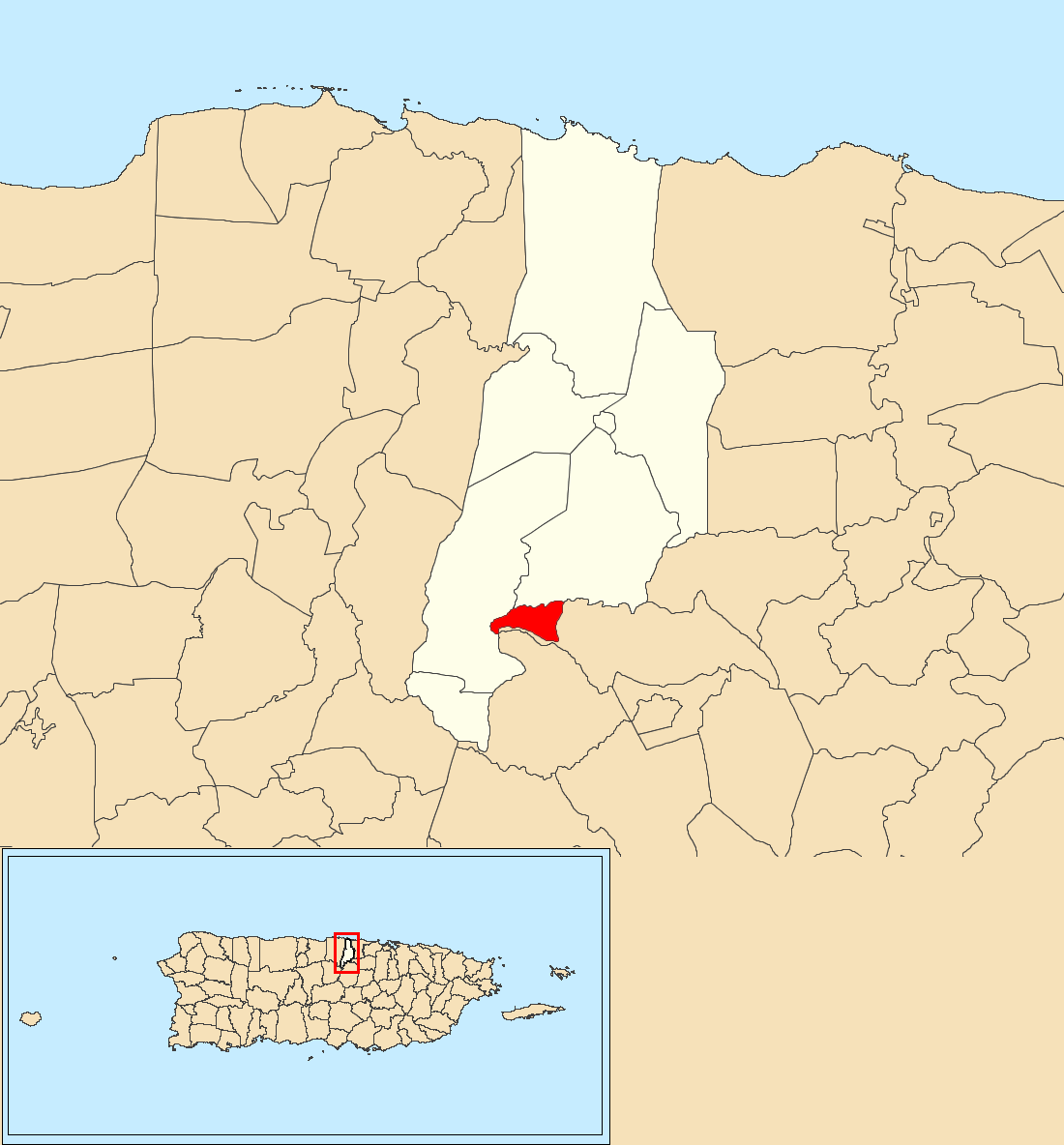
- Location of Mavilla within the municipality of Vega Alta shown in red

- Location of Puerto Rico
- Coordinates: 18°21′47″N 66°20′48″W
- Commonwealth: Puerto Rico
- Municipality: Vega Alta

Area
  - Total: 0.45 sq mi (1.2 km^{2})
  - Land: 0.45 sq mi (1.2 km^{2})
  - Water: 0 sq mi (0 km^{2})
- Elevation: 397 ft (121 m)

Population (2010)
  - Total: 369
  - Density: 820/sq mi (320/km^{2})
- Source: 2010 Census
- Time zone: UTC−4 (AST)

Mavilla is a barrio in the municipality of Vega Alta, Puerto Rico. Its population in 2010 was 369.

== History ==
Mavilla was in Spain's gazetteers until Puerto Rico was ceded by Spain in the aftermath of the Spanish–American War under the terms of the Treaty of Paris of 1898 and became an unincorporated territory of the United States. In 1899, the United States Department of War conducted a census of Puerto Rico finding that the combined population of Mavilla barrio and Cienegueta barrio was 982.

Historical population
Census	Pop.	Note	%±
1910	386		—
1920	425		10.1%
1930	464		9.2%
1940	419		−9.7%
1950	445		6.2%
1960	261		−41.3%
1970	307		17.6%
1980	468		52.4%
1990	319		−31.8%
2000	422		32.3%
2010	369		−12.6%
U.S. Decennial Census; 1900 (N/A) 1910-1930; 1930-1950 1960 1980-2000 2010

== See also ==
- List of communities in Puerto Rico
