= Vega Alta barrio-pueblo =

Historical and administrative center (seat) of Vega Alta, Puerto Rico

Vega Alta barrio-pueblo Pueblo de Vega Alta
- Municipality Seat
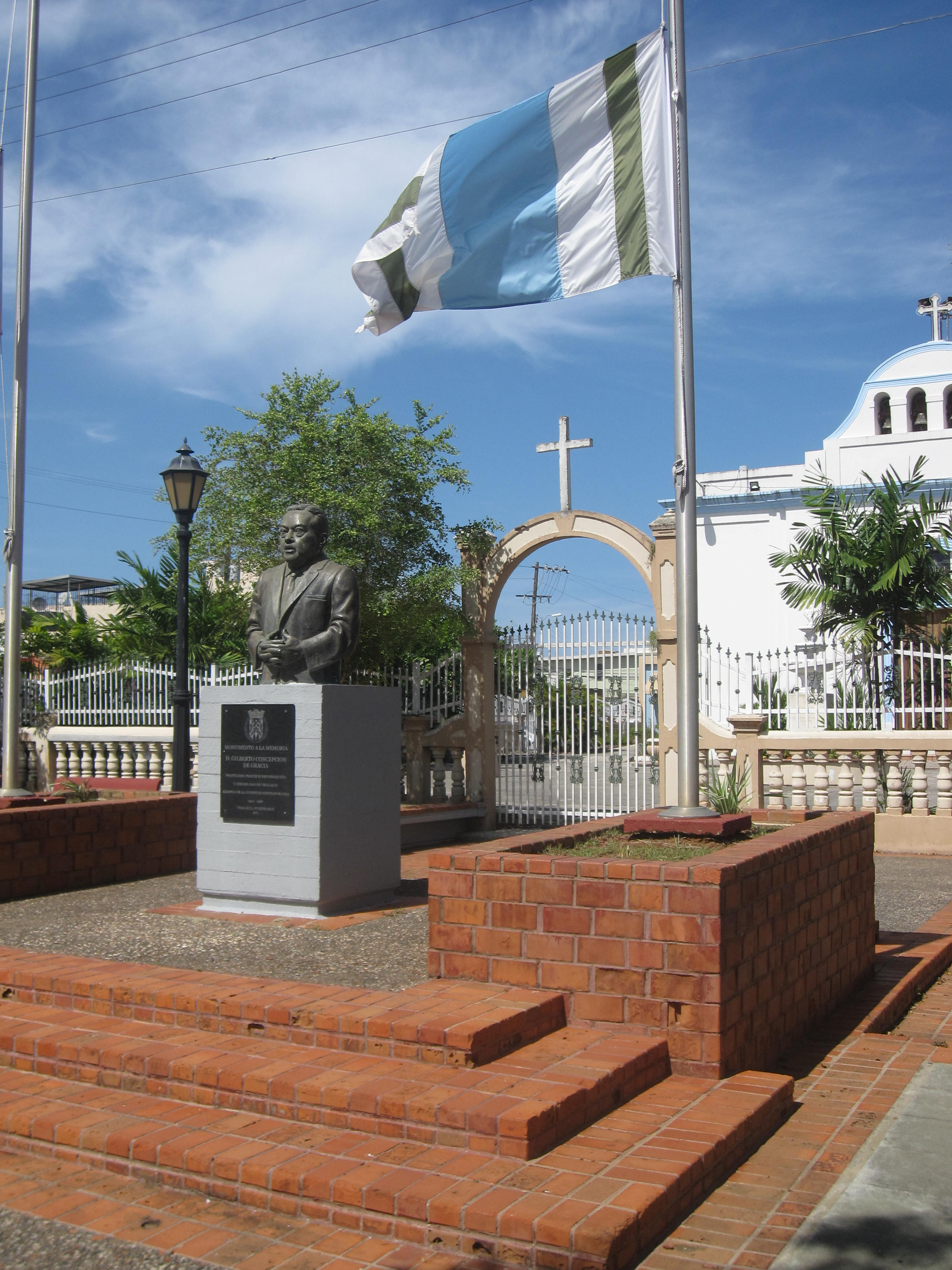
- Vega Alta central plaza, municipal flag of Vega Alta and Catholic church

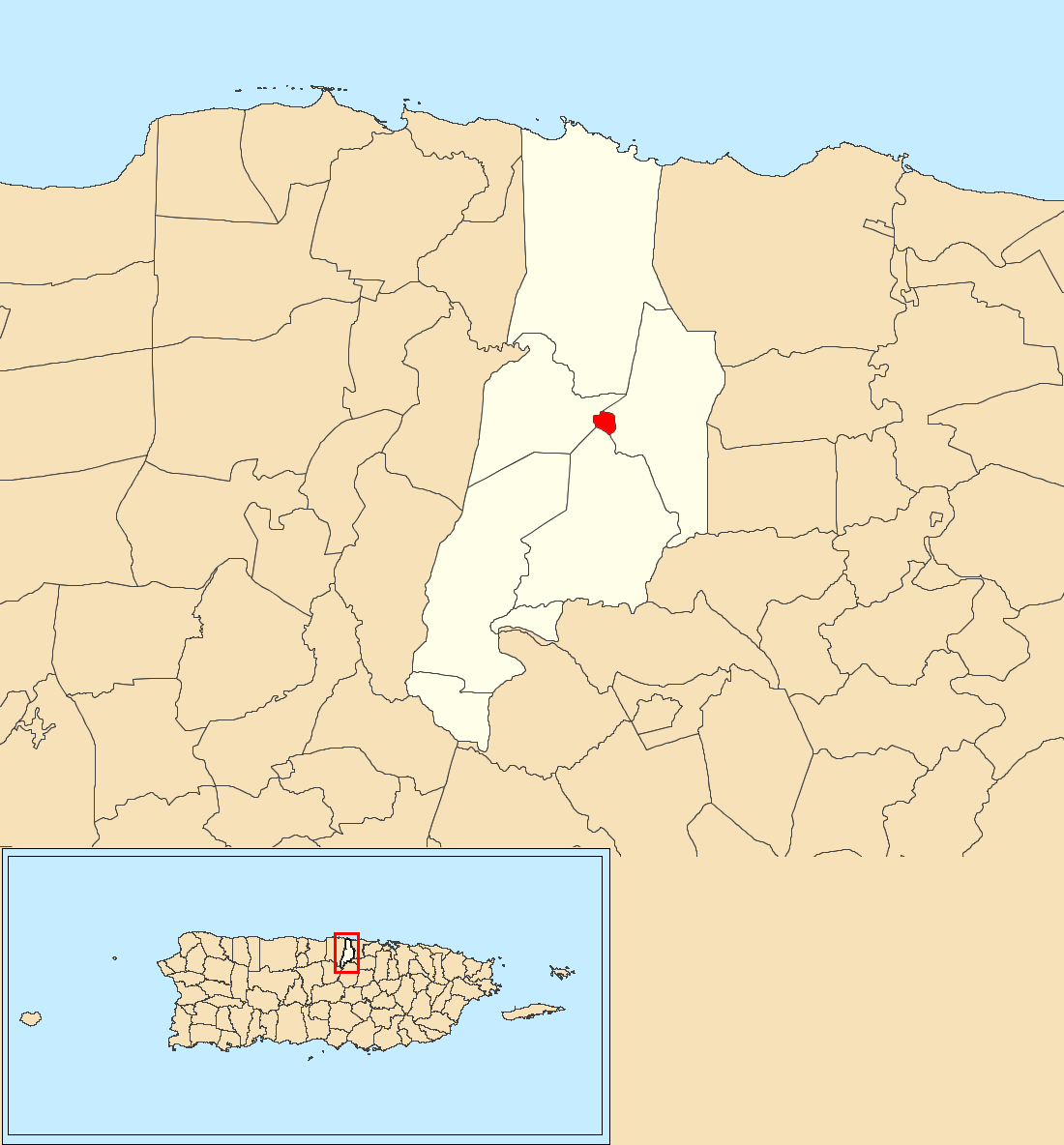
- Location of Vega Alta barrio-pueblo within the municipality of Vega Alta shown in red

- Location of Puerto Rico
- Coordinates: 18°24′41″N 66°19′44″W
- Commonwealth: Puerto Rico
- Municipality: Vega Alta

Area
  - Total: 0.1 sq mi (0.26 km^{2})
  - Land: 0.1 sq mi (0.26 km^{2})
  - Water: 0 sq mi (0 km^{2})
- Elevation: 108 ft (33 m)

Population (2010)
  - Total: 1,169
  - Density: 11,690/sq mi (4,510/km^{2})
- Source: 2010 Census
- Time zone: UTC−4 (AST)

Vega Alta barrio-pueblo is a barrio and the administrative center (seat) of Vega Alta, a municipality of Puerto Rico. Its population in 2010 was 1,169.

As was customary in Spain, in Puerto Rico, the municipality has a barrio called pueblo which contains a central plaza, the municipal buildings (city hall), and a Catholic church. Fiestas patronales (patron saint festivals) are held in the central plaza every year.

== The central plaza and its church ==
The central plaza, or square, is a place for official and unofficial recreational events and a place where people can gather and socialize from dusk to dawn. The Laws of the Indies, Spanish law, which regulated life in Puerto Rico in the early 19th century, stated the plaza's purpose was for "the parties" (celebrations, festivities) (Spanish: a propósito para las fiestas), and that the square should be proportionally large enough for the number of neighbors (Spanish: grandeza proporcionada al número de vecinos). These Spanish regulations also stated that the streets nearby should be comfortable portals for passersby, protecting them from the elements: sun and rain.

Located across the central plaza in Vega Alta barrio-pueblo is the Parroquia Inmaculada Concepción, a Roman Catholic church.

== History ==
Vega Alta barrio-pueblo was in Spain's gazetteers until Puerto Rico was ceded by Spain in the aftermath of the Spanish–American War under the terms of the Treaty of Paris of 1898 and became an unincorporated territory of the United States. In 1899, the United States Department of War conducted a census of Puerto Rico finding that the population of Pueblo was 1,081.

Historical population
Census	Pop.	Note	%±
1900	1,081		—
1910	1,657		53.3%
1920	2,142		29.3%
1930	2,884		34.6%
1940	3,238		12.3%
1950	3,492		7.8%
1960	3,182		−8.9%
1970	0		−100.0%
1980	1,583		—
1990	1,460		−7.8%
2000	1,242		−14.9%
2010	1,169		−5.9%
U.S. Decennial Census; 1899 (shown as 1900) 1910-1930; 1930-1950 1960 1980-2000 2010

== Lin-Manuel Miranda tourism ==
The Puerto Rican, award-winning, musician and playwright Lin-Manuel Miranda who created the Broadway hit, "Hamilton", is from a family with roots in Vega Alta. In 2017, his father opened the Placita Güisín, a cafe and restaurant in Vega Alta barrio-pueblo. In 2019 Lin-Manuel moved his memorabilia to a new gallery, the Lin-Manuel Miranda Gallery, a few steps from Placita Güisín and opened a store there called TeeRico. The location has become a tourist attraction.

== Gallery ==
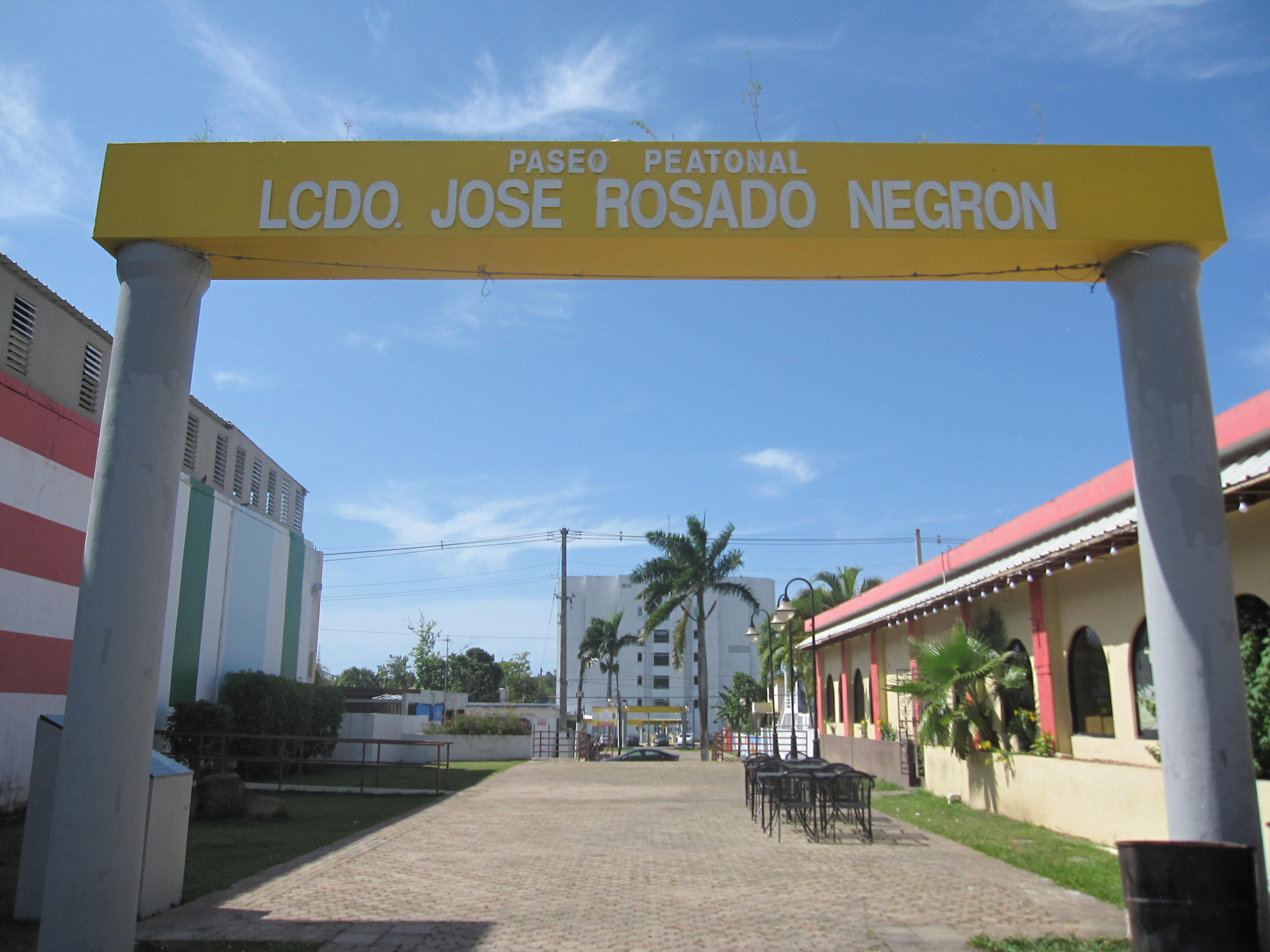
Jose Rosado Negron pedestrian zone

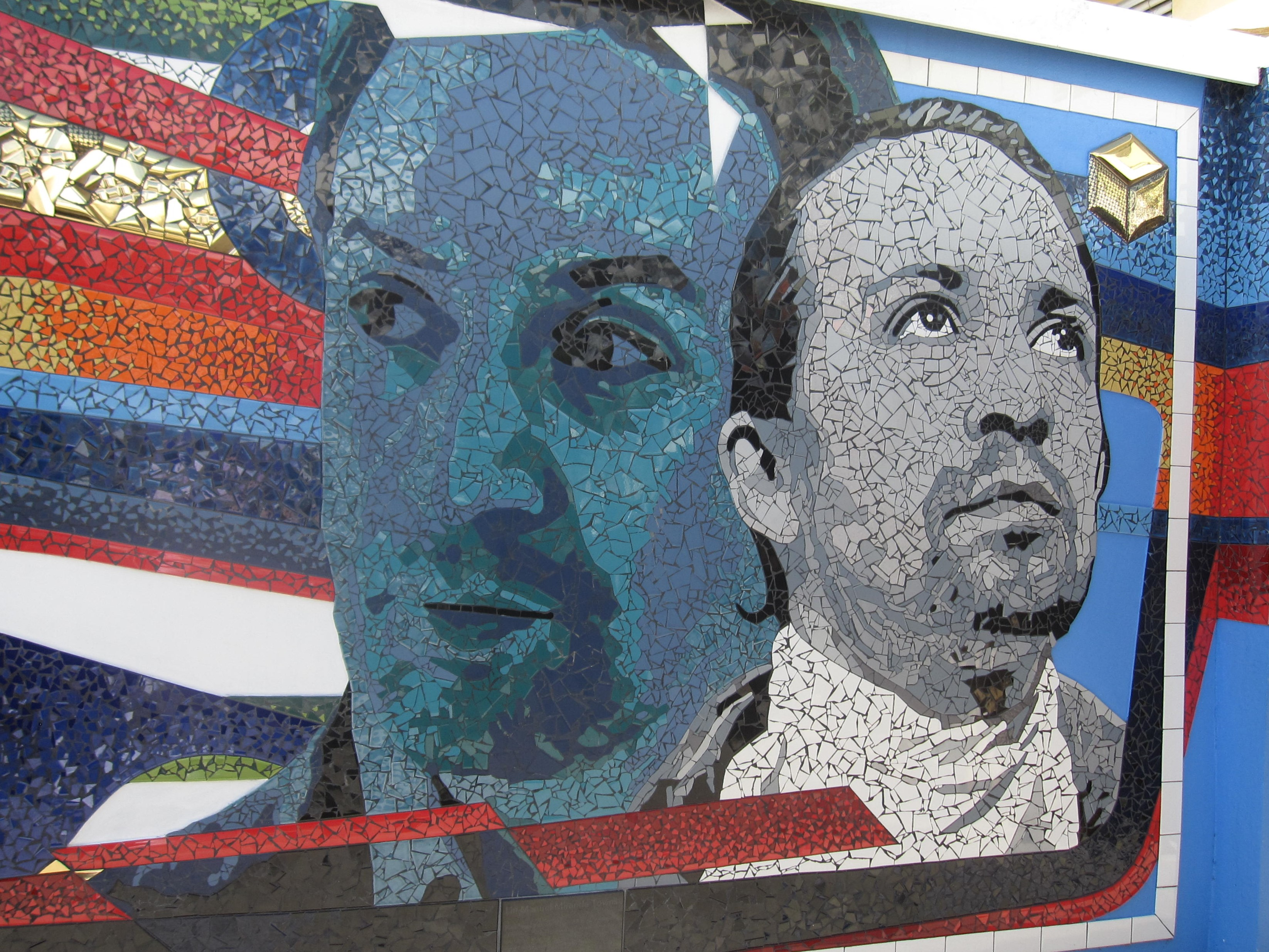
Mosaic at Placita Güisín

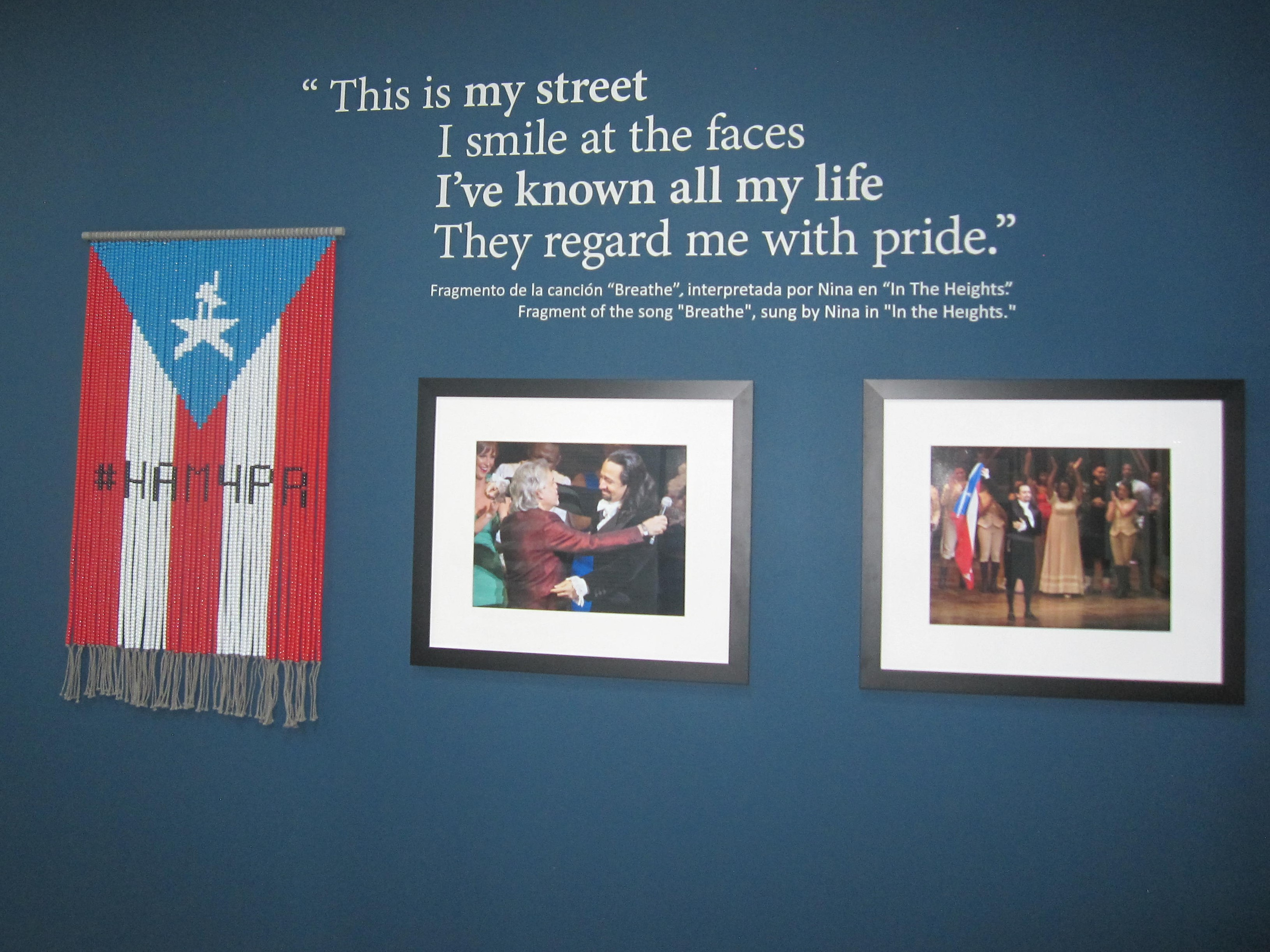
Lin-Manuel Miranda Gallery

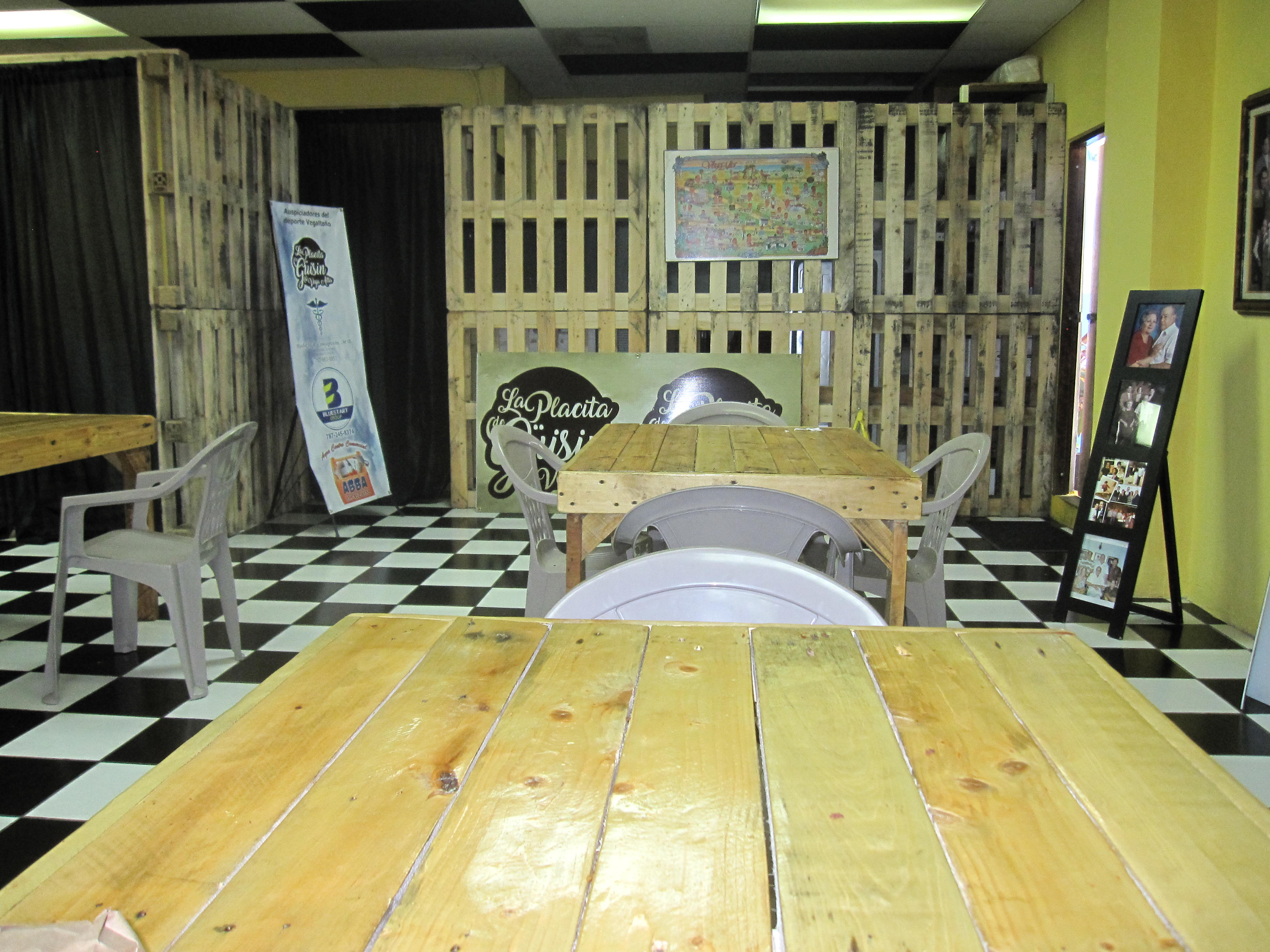
Placita Güisín

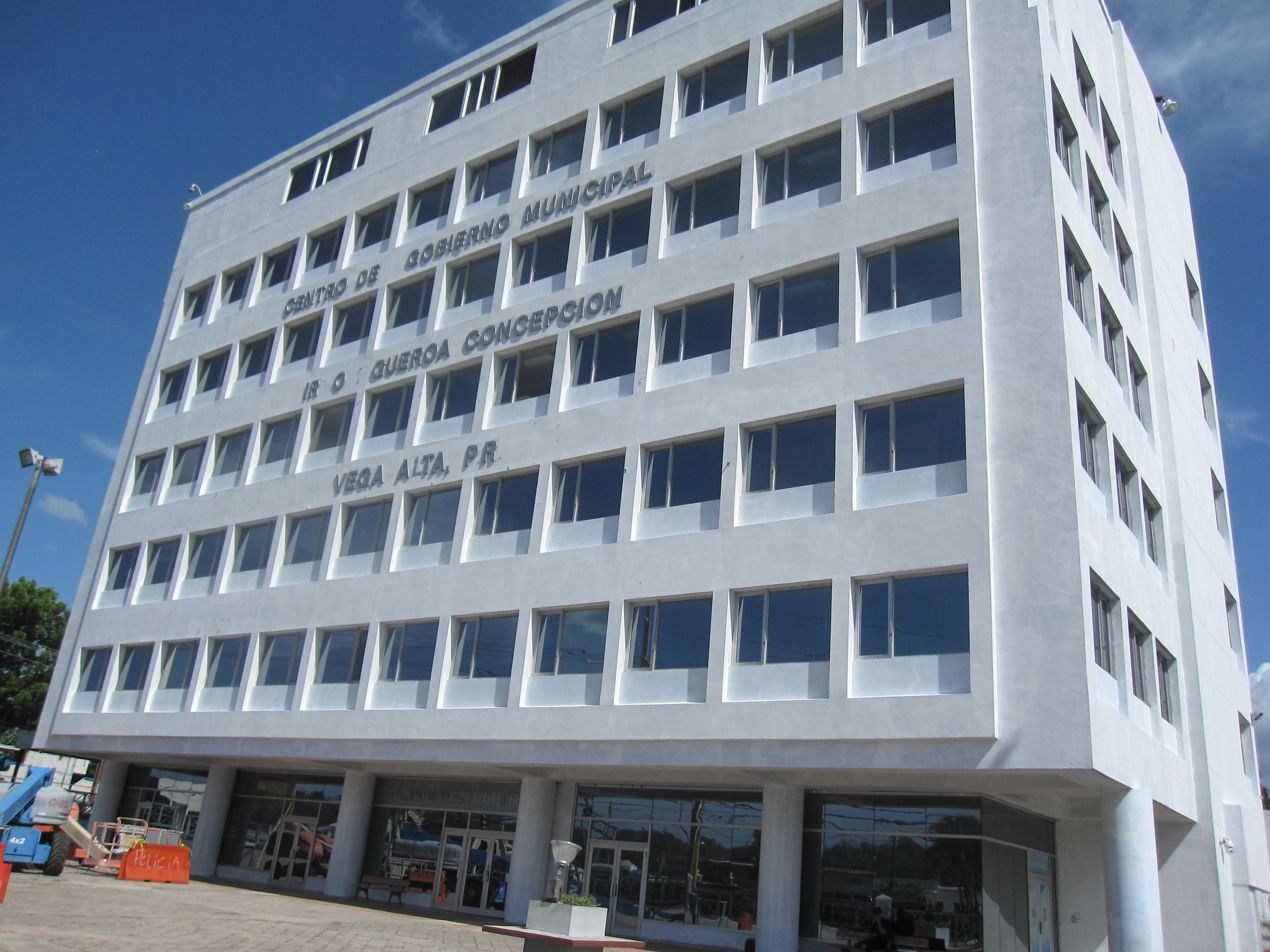
Municipal building (town hall)

== See also ==
- List of communities in Puerto Rico
