= Espinosa, Vega Alta, Puerto Rico =

Barrio of Puerto Rico

Espinosa
- Barrio
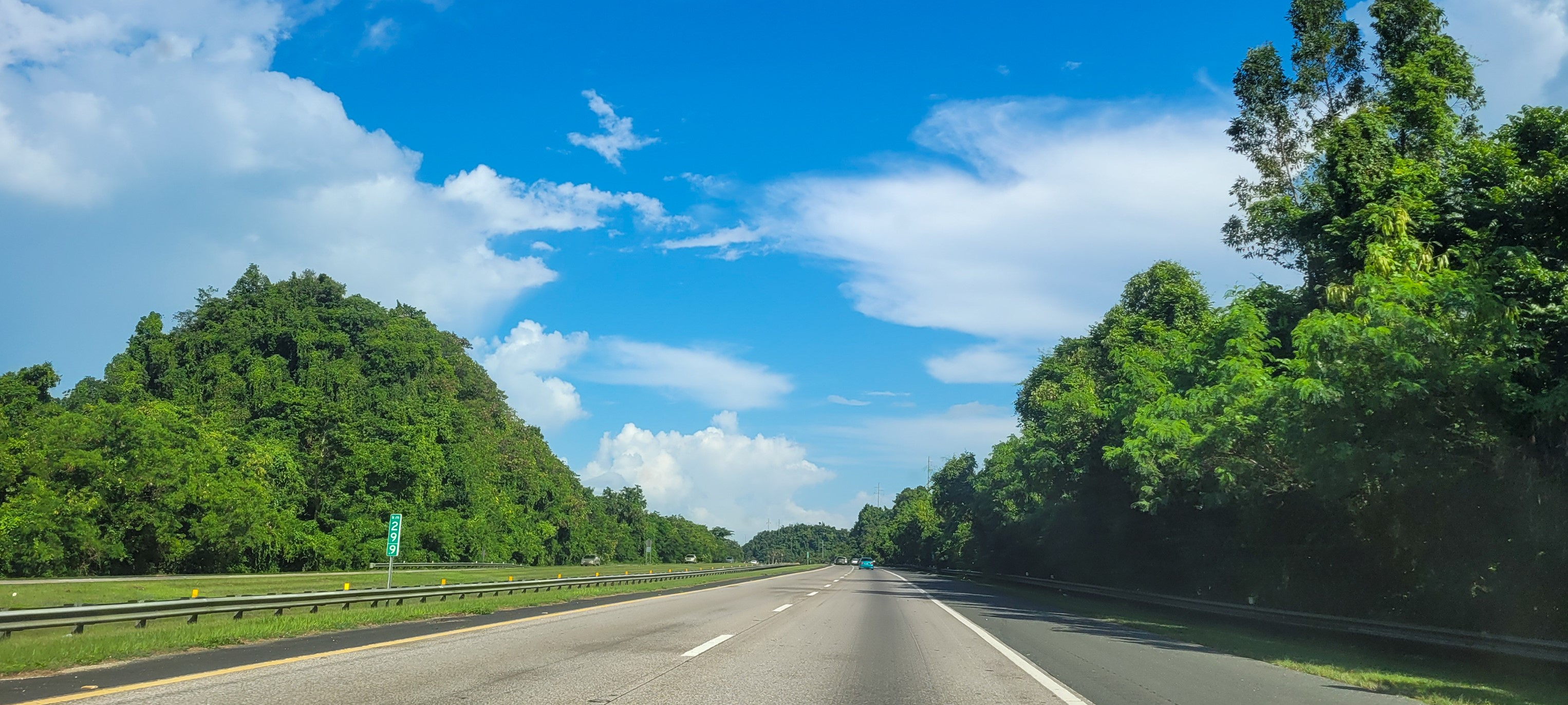
- Puerto Rico Highway 22 in Espinosa barrio

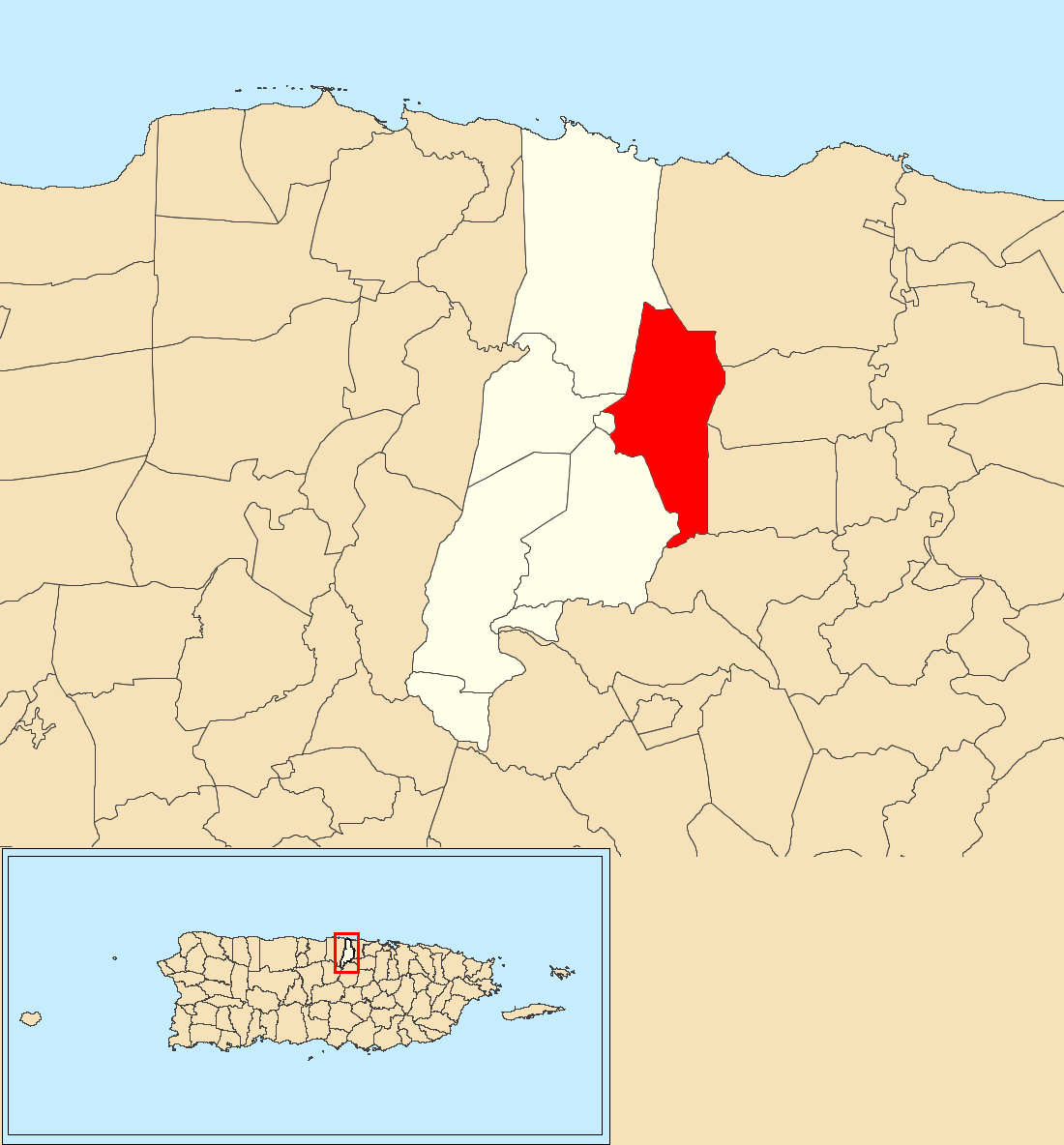
- Location of Espinosa within the municipality of Vega Alta shown in red

- Location of Puerto Rico
- Coordinates: 18°24′48″N 66°18′44″W
- Commonwealth: Puerto Rico
- Municipality: Vega Alta

Area
  - Total: 4.41 sq mi (11.4 km^{2})
  - Land: 4.41 sq mi (11.4 km^{2})
  - Water: 0 sq mi (0 km^{2})
- Elevation: 151 ft (46 m)

Population (2010)
  - Total: 11,706
  - Density: 2,654.4/sq mi (1,024.9/km^{2})
- Source: 2010 Census
- Time zone: UTC−4 (AST)
- Postal code: ZIP Code

Espinosa is a barrio in the municipality of Vega Alta, Puerto Rico. Its population in 2010 was 11,706.

== History ==
Espinosa was in Spain's gazetteers until Puerto Rico was ceded by Spain in the aftermath of the Spanish–American War under the terms of the Treaty of Paris of 1898 and became an unincorporated territory of the United States. In 1899, the United States Department of War conducted a census of Puerto Rico finding that the population of Espinosa barrio was 781.

Historical population
| Census | Pop. | Note | %± |
|---|---|---|---|
| 1900 | 781 | | — |
| 1910 | 1,063 | | 36.1% |
| 1920 | 1,282 | | 20.6% |
| 1930 | 1,651 | | 28.8% |
| 1940 | 1,978 | | 19.8% |
| 1950 | 2,752 | | 39.1% |
| 1960 | 3,071 | | 11.6% |
| 1970 | 0 | | −100.0% |
| 1980 | 8,619 | | — |
| 1990 | 12,207 | | 41.6% |
| 2000 | 12,613 | | 3.3% |
| 2010 | 11,706 | | −7.2% |
U.S. Decennial Census; 1899 (shown as 1900) 1910-1930; 1930-1950 1960 1980-2000 2010

== Gallery ==
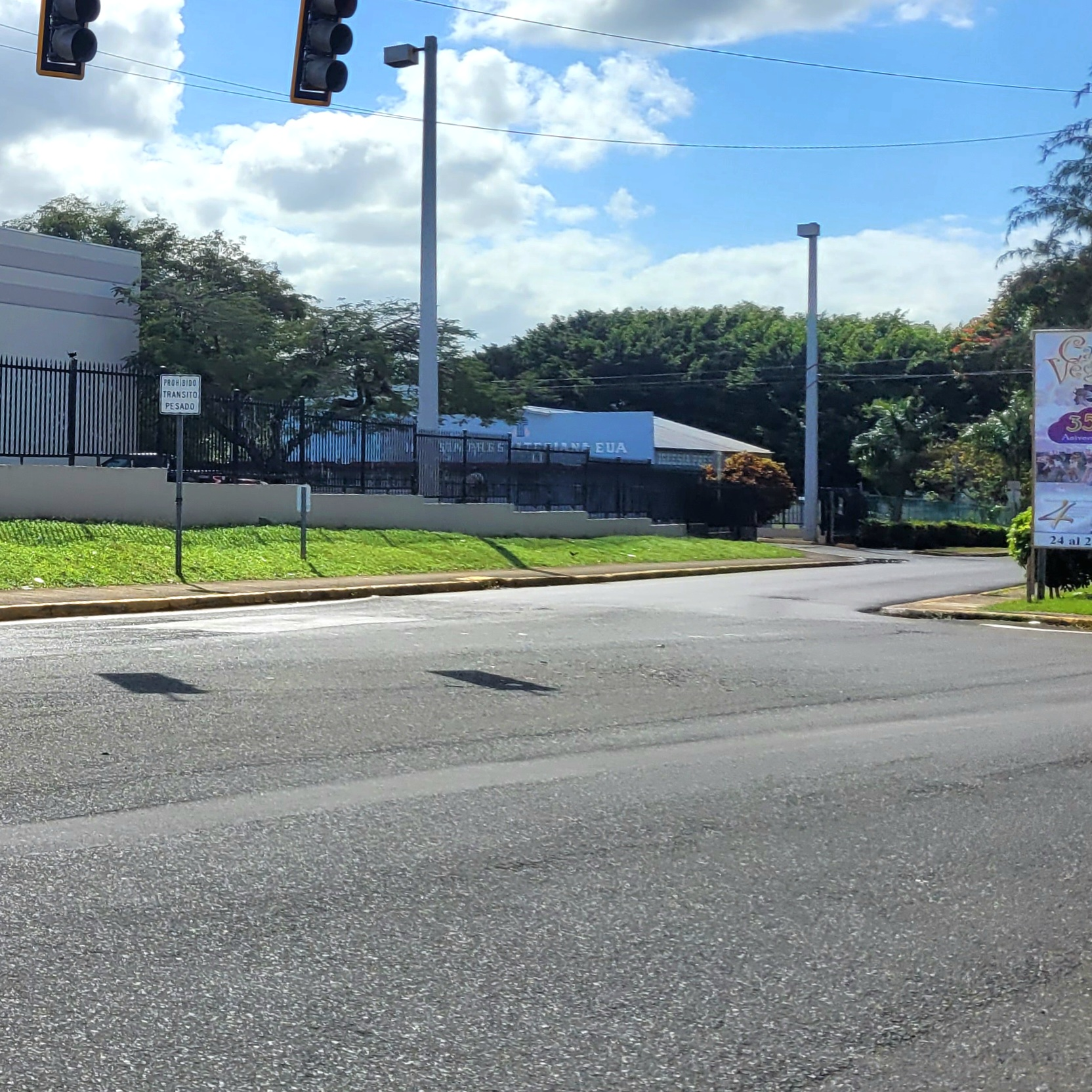
Puerto Rico Highway 676 in Espinosa

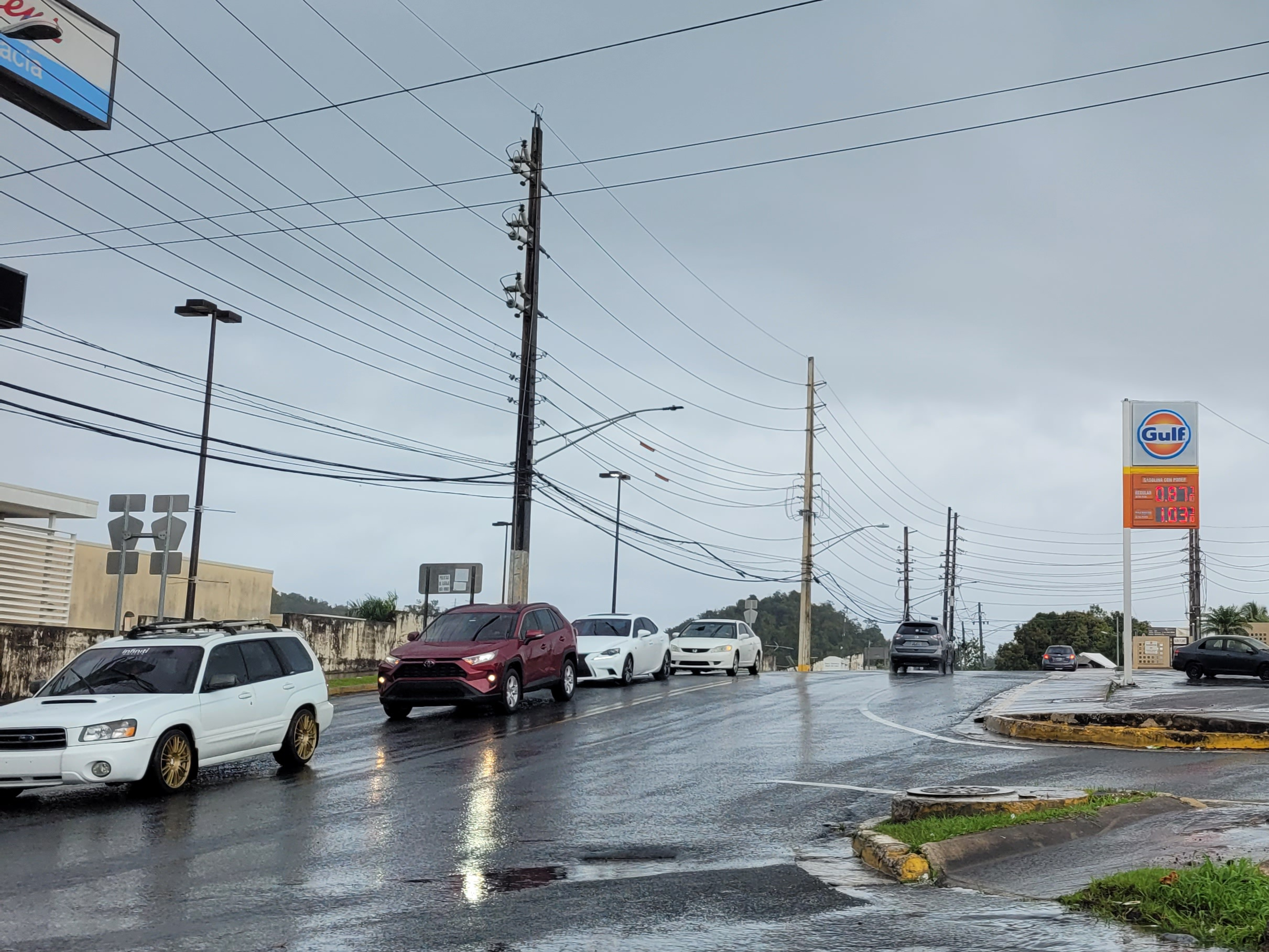
Puerto Rico Highway 694 in Espinosa

== See also ==
- List of communities in Puerto Rico
