= Cienegueta =

Barrio of Vega Alta, Puerto Rico

- Barrio
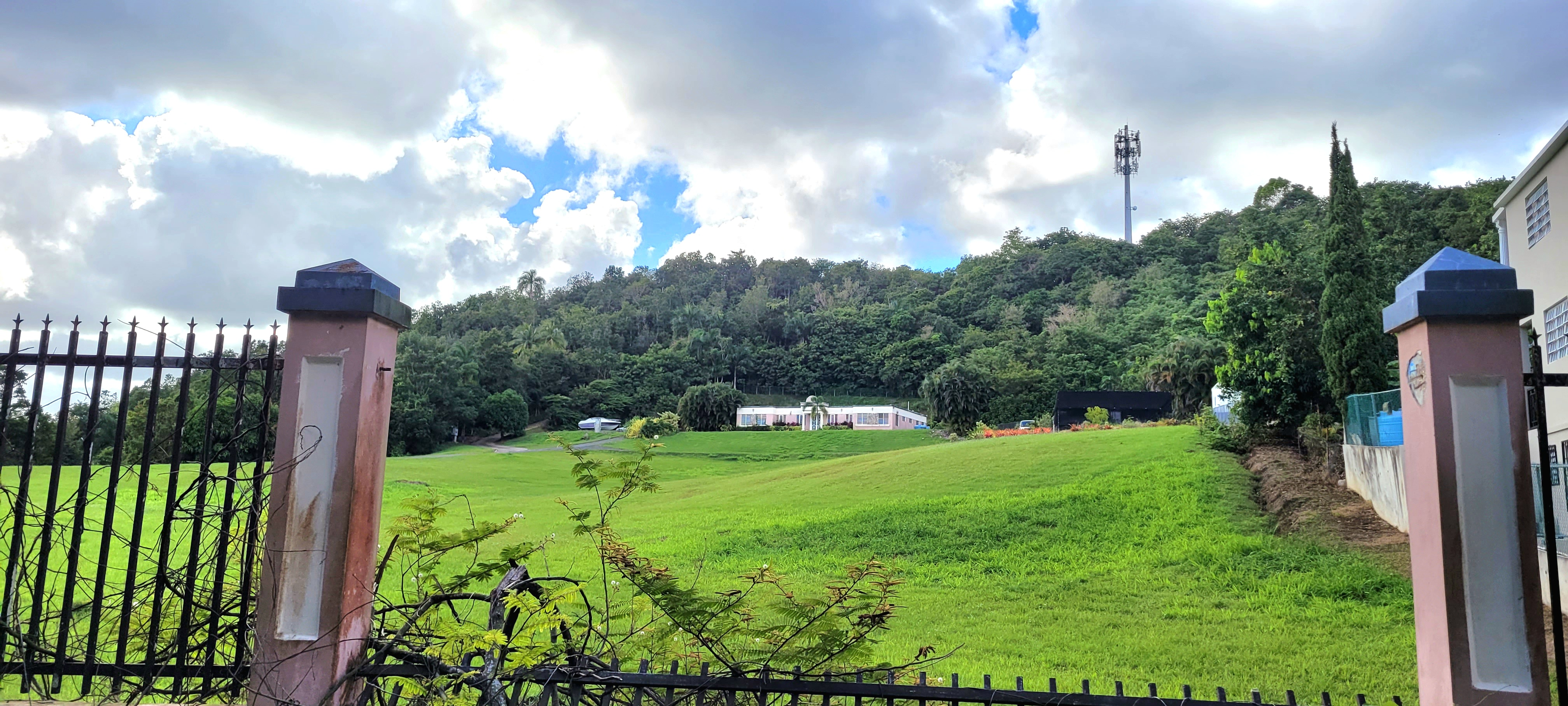
- Karst mountains in Cienegueta

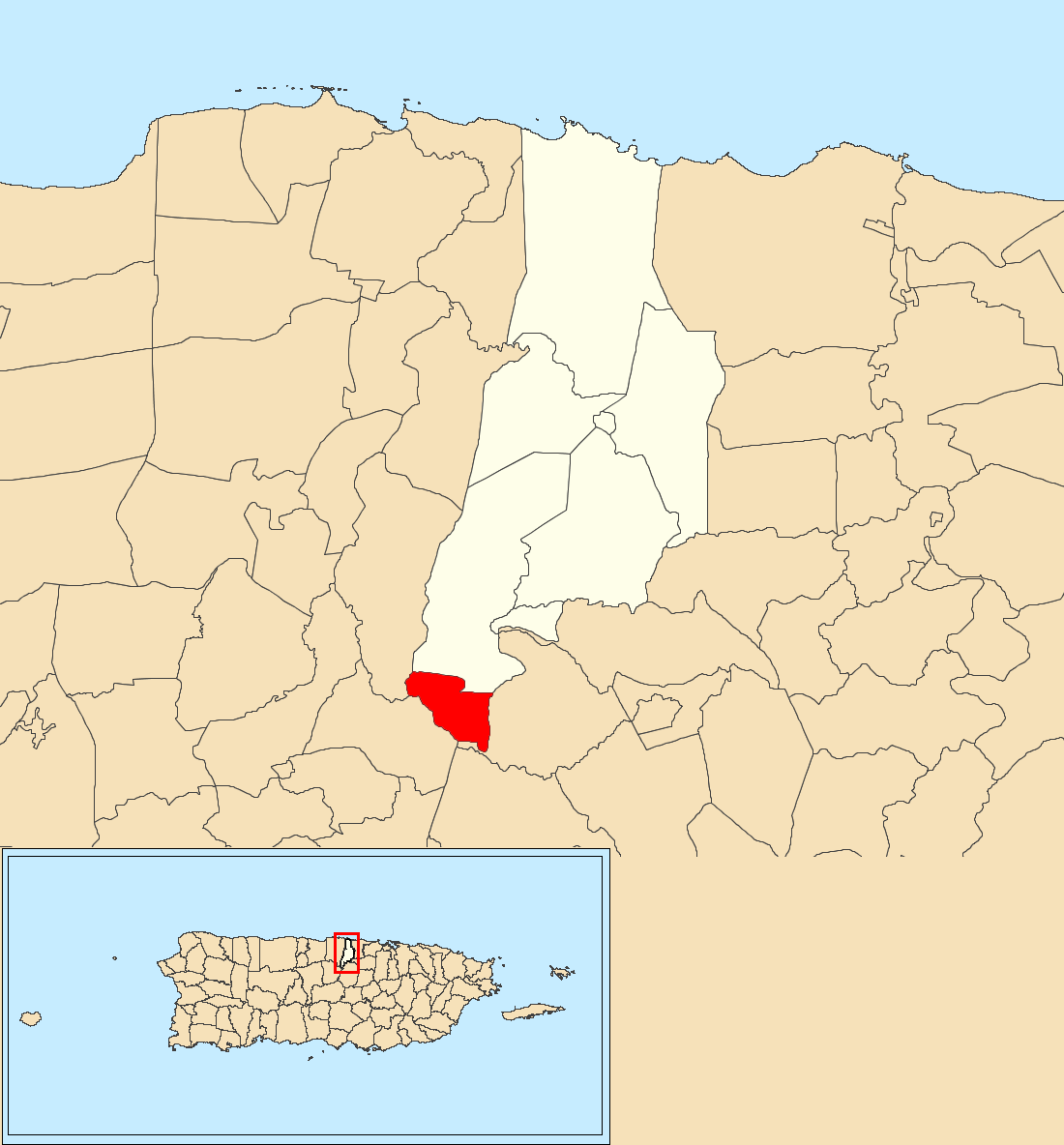
- Location of Cienegueta within the municipality of Vega Alta shown in red

- Location of Puerto Rico
- Coordinates: 18°20′30″N 66°21′59″W
- Commonwealth: Puerto Rico
- Municipality: Vega Alta

Area
  - Total: 1.04 sq mi (2.7 km^{2})
  - Land: 1.04 sq mi (2.7 km^{2})
  - Water: 0 sq mi (0 km^{2})
- Elevation: 810 ft (250 m)

Population (2010)
  - Total: 711
  - Density: 683.7/sq mi (264.0/km^{2})
- Source: 2010 Census
- Time zone: UTC−4 (AST)

Cienegueta is a barrio in the municipality of Vega Alta, Puerto Rico. Its population in 2010 was 711.

== History ==
Cienegueta was in Spain's gazetteers until Puerto Rico was ceded by Spain in the aftermath of the Spanish–American War under the terms of the Treaty of Paris of 1898 and became an unincorporated territory of the United States. In 1899, the United States Department of War conducted a census of Puerto Rico finding that the combined population of Mavilla barrio and Cienegueta barrio was 982.

Historical population
Census	Pop.	Note	%±
1910	960		—
1920	961		0.1%
1930	900		−6.3%
1940	1,058		17.6%
1950	1,050		−0.8%
1960	335		−68.1%
1970	280		−16.4%
1980	210		−25.0%
1990	391		86.2%
2000	440		12.5%
2010	711		61.6%
U.S. Decennial Census; 1900 (N/A) 1910-1930; 1930-1950 1960 1980-2000 2010

== See also ==
- List of communities in Puerto Rico
