= Candelaria, Vega Alta, Puerto Rico =

Barrio of Puerto Rico

Candelaria
- Barrio
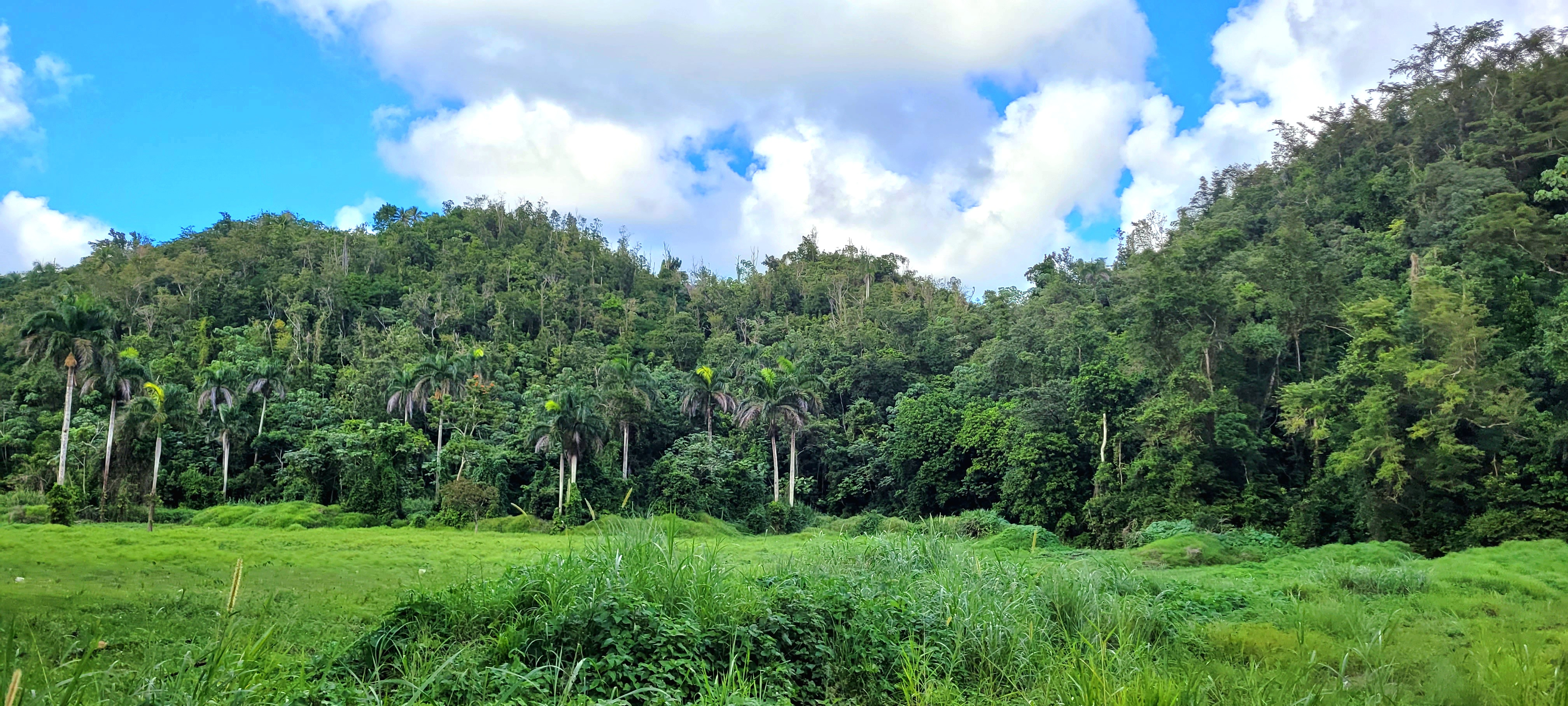
- Karst landscape in Candelaria

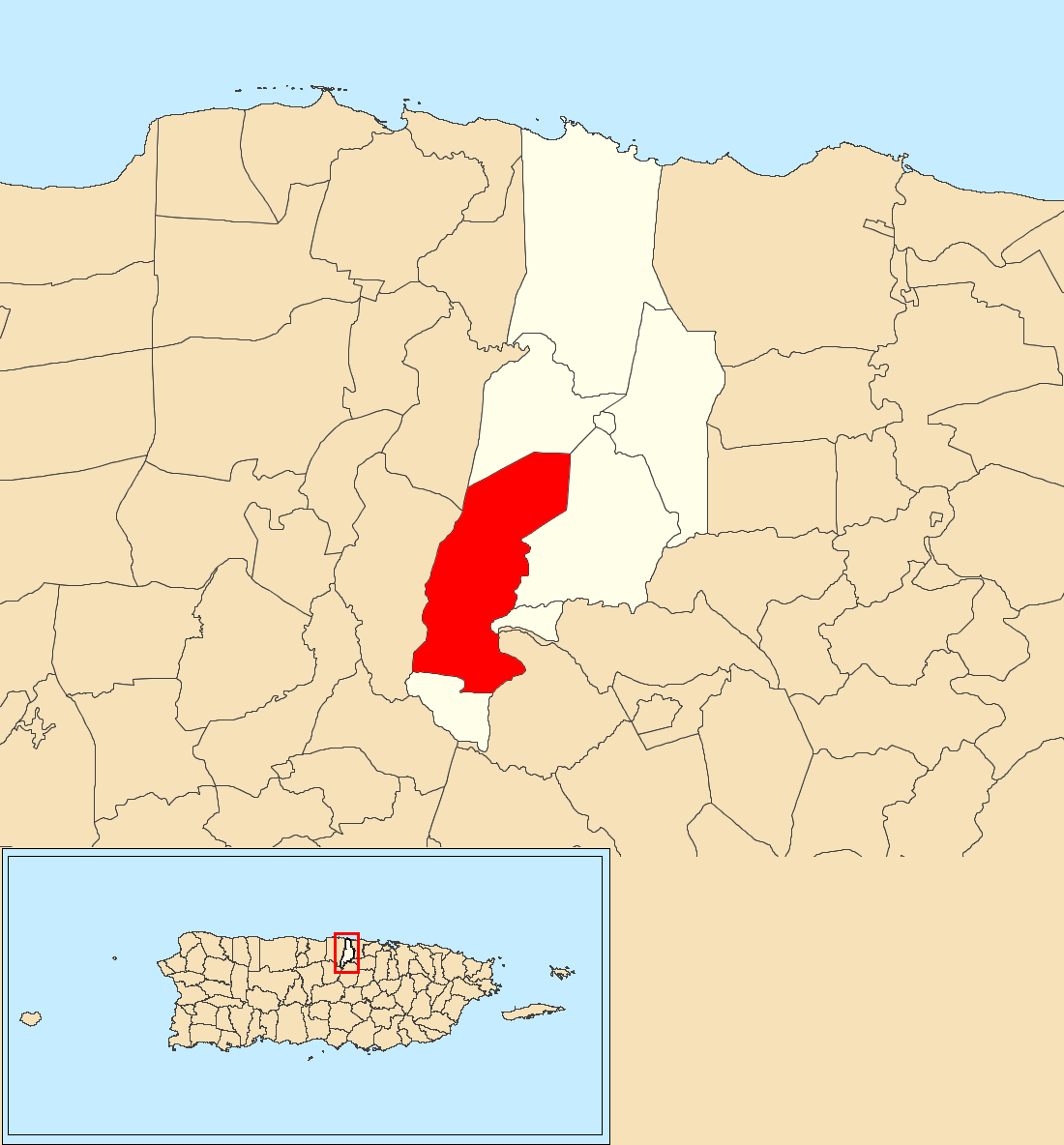
- Location of Candelaria within the municipality of Vega Alta shown in red

- Location of Puerto Rico
- Coordinates: 18°22′30″N 66°21′29″W
- Commonwealth: Puerto Rico
- Municipality: Vega Alta

Area
  - Total: 5.44 sq mi (14.1 km^{2})
  - Land: 5.44 sq mi (14.1 km^{2})
  - Water: 0 sq mi (0 km^{2})
- Elevation: 502 ft (153 m)

Population (2010)
  - Total: 1,915
  - Density: 352/sq mi (136/km^{2})
- Source: 2010 Census
- Time zone: UTC−4 (AST)

Candelaria is a barrio in the municipality of Vega Alta, Puerto Rico. Its population in 2010 was 1,915.

== History ==
Candelaria was in Spain's gazetteers until Puerto Rico was ceded by Spain in the aftermath of the Spanish–American War under the terms of the Treaty of Paris of 1898 and became an unincorporated territory of the United States. In 1899, the United States Department of War conducted a census of Puerto Rico finding that the population of Candelaria barrio was 863.

Historical population
Census	Pop.	Note	%±
1900	863		—
1910	1,056		22.4%
1920	1,146		8.5%
1930	1,270		10.8%
1940	1,285		1.2%
1950	1,276		−0.7%
1960	1,259		−1.3%
1970	824		−34.6%
1980	905		9.8%
1990	1,879		107.6%
2000	1,687		−10.2%
2010	1,915		13.5%
U.S. Decennial Census; 1899 (shown as 1900) 1910-1930; 1930-1950 1960 1980-2000 2010

== Gallery ==
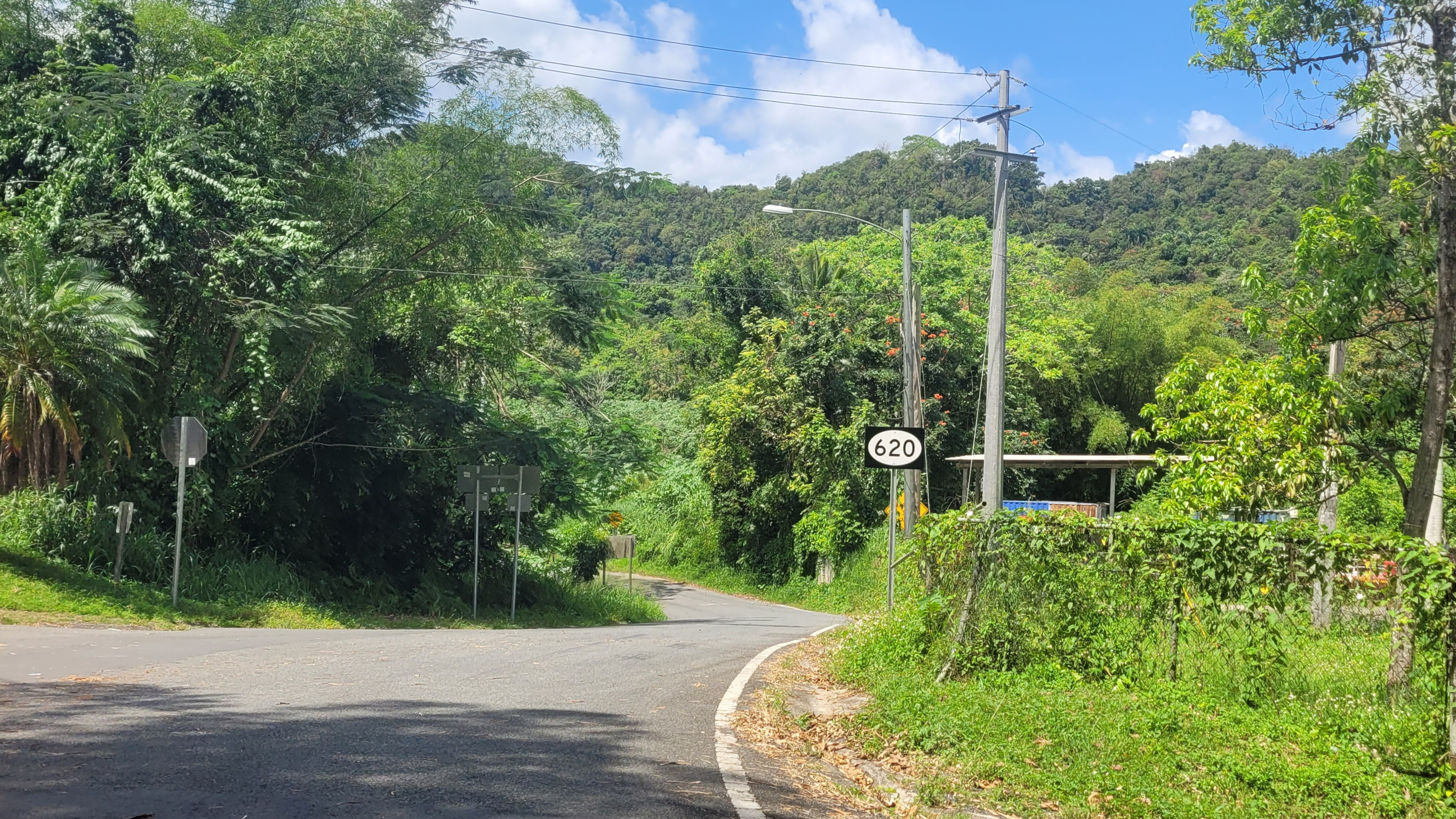
Puerto Rico Highway 620 in Candelaria

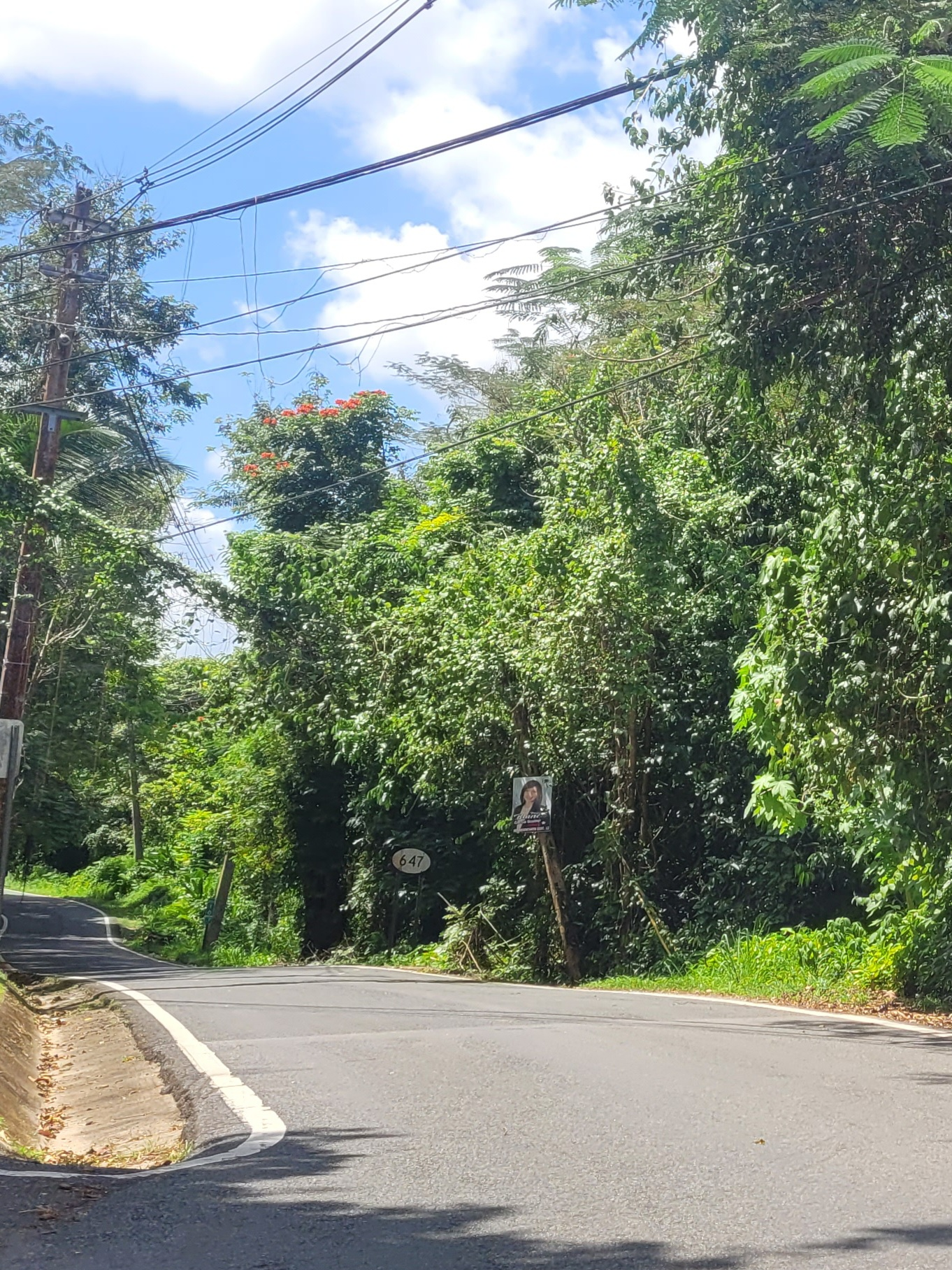
Puerto Rico Highway 647 in Candelaria

== See also ==
- List of communities in Puerto Rico
