= Vega Alta, Puerto Rico =

Town and municipality in Puerto Rico

Vega Municipio Autónomo de Vega Alta
- Town and Municipality
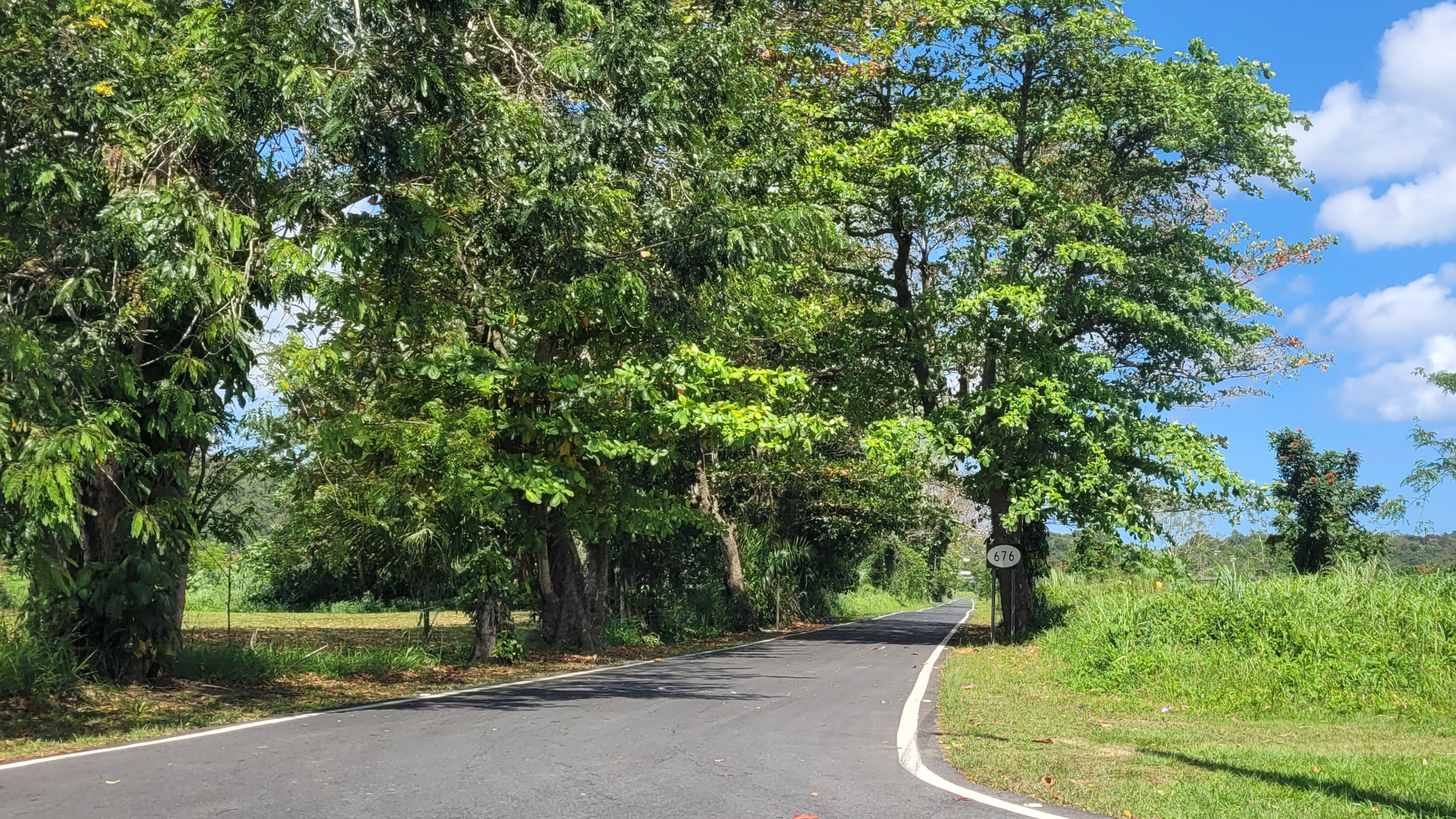
- PR-676 in Vega Alta

- Flag Coat of arms
- Nicknames: Pueblo de los Ñangotaos, Los Maceteros
- Anthem: "En La Costa Norte De Mi Islita"
- Map of Puerto Rico highlighting Vega Alta Municipality
- Coordinates: 18°24′44″N 66°19′53″W
- Sovereign state: United States
- Commonwealth: Puerto Rico
- Settled: 1775
- Founded: January 22, 1787
- Founder: Don Francisco de la Cruz
- Barrios: 8 barrios: Bajura; Candelaria; Cienegueta; Espinosa; Maricao; Mavilla; Sabana; Vega Alta barrio-pueblo

Government
  - Mayor: María Vega Pagán (PNP)
  - Senatorial dist.: 3 - Arecibo
  - Representative dist.: 11,12

Area
  - Total: 27.75 sq mi (71.87 km^{2})

Population (2020)
  - Total: 35,395
  - Estimate (2025): 34,351 ▼
  - Rank: 32nd in Puerto Rico
  - Density: 1,276/sq mi (492.5/km^{2})
- Demonym: Vegalteños
- Time zone: UTC-4 (AST)
- ZIP Code: 00692
- Area code: 787/939

Vega Alta (Spanish pronunciation: [ˈbeɣa‿ˈalta]) is a town and municipality of Puerto Rico. Vega Alta is on the northern coast of the island, north of Morovis and Corozal; east of Vega Baja; and west of Dorado with an area of 28 square miles (73 km^{2}). Vega Alta is subdivided into seven barrios and Vega Alta barrio-pueblo (the downtown area and the administrative center of the city). It is part of the San Juan-Caguas-Guaynabo Metropolitan Statistical Area.

Vega Alta is west of San Juan, the capital of Puerto Rico. Vega Alta is known for the beach at Cerro Gordo. Other points of interest include the town's Catholic church, known as Inmaculada Concepción, which was founded in 1813, and the Vega Alta Forest.

During the first week of December, Vega Alta celebrates its patron saint, the Immaculate Conception.

”Vega Alta” translates to “high meadow” or "upper meadow" in English.

== History ==
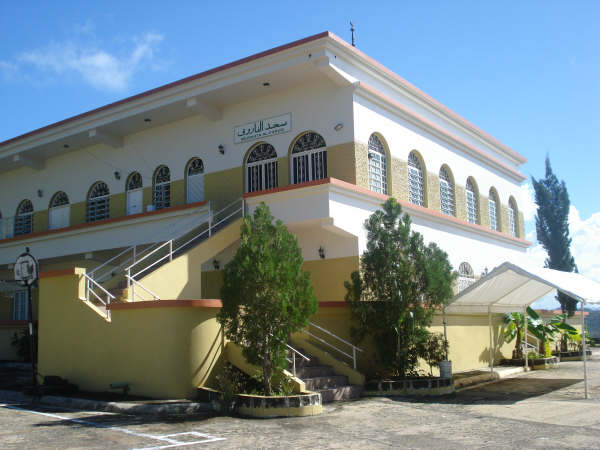
Al-Faruq Mosque in Vega Alta, the largest in Puerto Rico, built in 1992

Vega Alta was founded in 1775 by Francisco de los Olivos. It was first named La Vega de Espinosa and popularly known as el pueblo de los 'ñangotaos ('the town of the squatters'), in reference to the jíbaros country folk who would wait for the train in a squatting position, due to a lack of benches. Before this, it was part of a group of towns known as Las Vegas. It was then separated into two municipalities: Vega Baja and the other Vega Alta.

Puerto Rico was ceded by Spain in the aftermath of the Spanish–American War under the terms of the Treaty of Paris of 1898 and became a territory of the United States. In 1899, the United States conducted its first census of Puerto Rico finding that the population of Vega Alta was 6,107.

On October 12, 1898, the city's mayor, Francisco Vega, received U.S. troops as part of the Spanish–American War. On that same day, for the first time in Vega Alta's history, the U.S. flag was lifted on city hall. From 1902 to 1905, Vega Alta became once more part of the neighboring municipality of Vega Baja. In 1905, the government of Puerto Rico passed a law, allowing Vega Alta to become a municipality with its own limits.

Hacienda Carmen and Hacienda Ortega sugar plantations were owned by Juan Gualberto Landron y Martinez born in 1791 in Toa Baja . He owned slaves and purchased them, some coming directly from Africa.

The second-largest mosque in Puerto Rico, built in 1992, is located in Vega Alta.

Hurricane Maria on September 20, 2017, triggered numerous landslides in Vega Alta and 90% of homes made of wood were destroyed.

== Geography ==
Vega Alta is on the northern coast in the Northern Karst region.

Río Cibuco, Río Mavilla and Río Unibón are located in Vega Alta. The Javier Calderón Beach, better known as Cerro Gordo Beach is administered by the Puerto Rico Department of Sports and Recreation.

Vega Alta has a land area of 27.75 square miles (71.87 km^{2}) and water area of 9.76 square miles (25.28 km^{2}).

=== Barrios ===
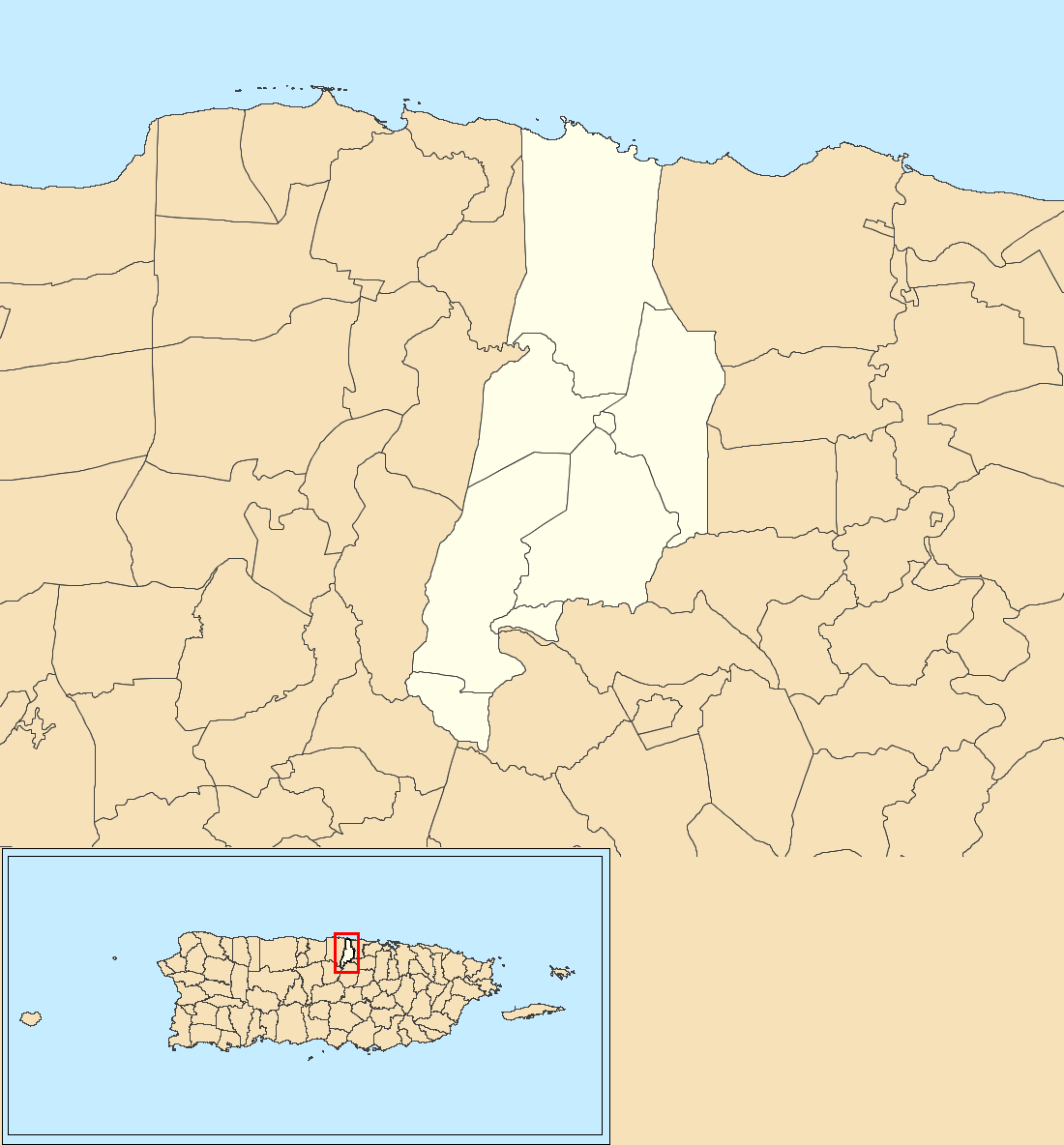
Subdivisions of Vega Alta

Like all municipalities of Puerto Rico, Vega Alta is subdivided into barrios. The municipal buildings, central square and large Catholic church are located in a barrio referred to as el pueblo.

1. Bajura
2. Candelaria
3. Cienegueta
4. Espinosa
5. Maricao
6. Mavilla
7. Sabana
8. Vega Alta barrio-pueblo

=== Sectors ===
Barrios (which are roughly comparable to minor civil divisions) and subbarrios, are further subdivided into smaller areas called sectores (sectors in English). The types of sectores may vary, from normally sector to urbanización to reparto to barriada to residencial, among others.

=== Special Communities ===
Comunidades Especiales de Puerto Rico (Special Communities of Puerto Rico) are marginalized communities whose citizens are experiencing a certain amount of social exclusion. A map shows these communities occur in nearly every municipality of the commonwealth. Of the 742 places that were on the list in 2014, the following barrios, communities, sectors, or neighborhoods were in Vega Alta: Villa Alegria, Villa del Rio, Mavilla, Machuchal, El Nueve, Ponderosa, Manantial, and Corea.

=== Climate ===
According to the Weather Channel's website, June is the warmest month, March is the coolest month, October is the wettest month, and June is the driest month. Records:

- The highest recorded temperature was 98 °F in July 2007.
- The lowest recorded temperature was 40 °F in January 1945.

== Economy ==
In 1908, Vega Alta was producing coffee, sugar, oranges, tobacco and rum.

=== Agriculture ===
- Banana, fruits, grains, and sugar cane.
- Flowers and ornamental plants.
- Dairy and meat cattle, pigs, and poultry.

=== Industry ===
- Manufacture of chemicals, electrical and electronic machinery, furniture, food, and plastics.
- Logistics Center

== Tourism ==
There are six beaches in Vega Alta, including Cerro Gordo.

=== Lin-Manuel Miranda ===
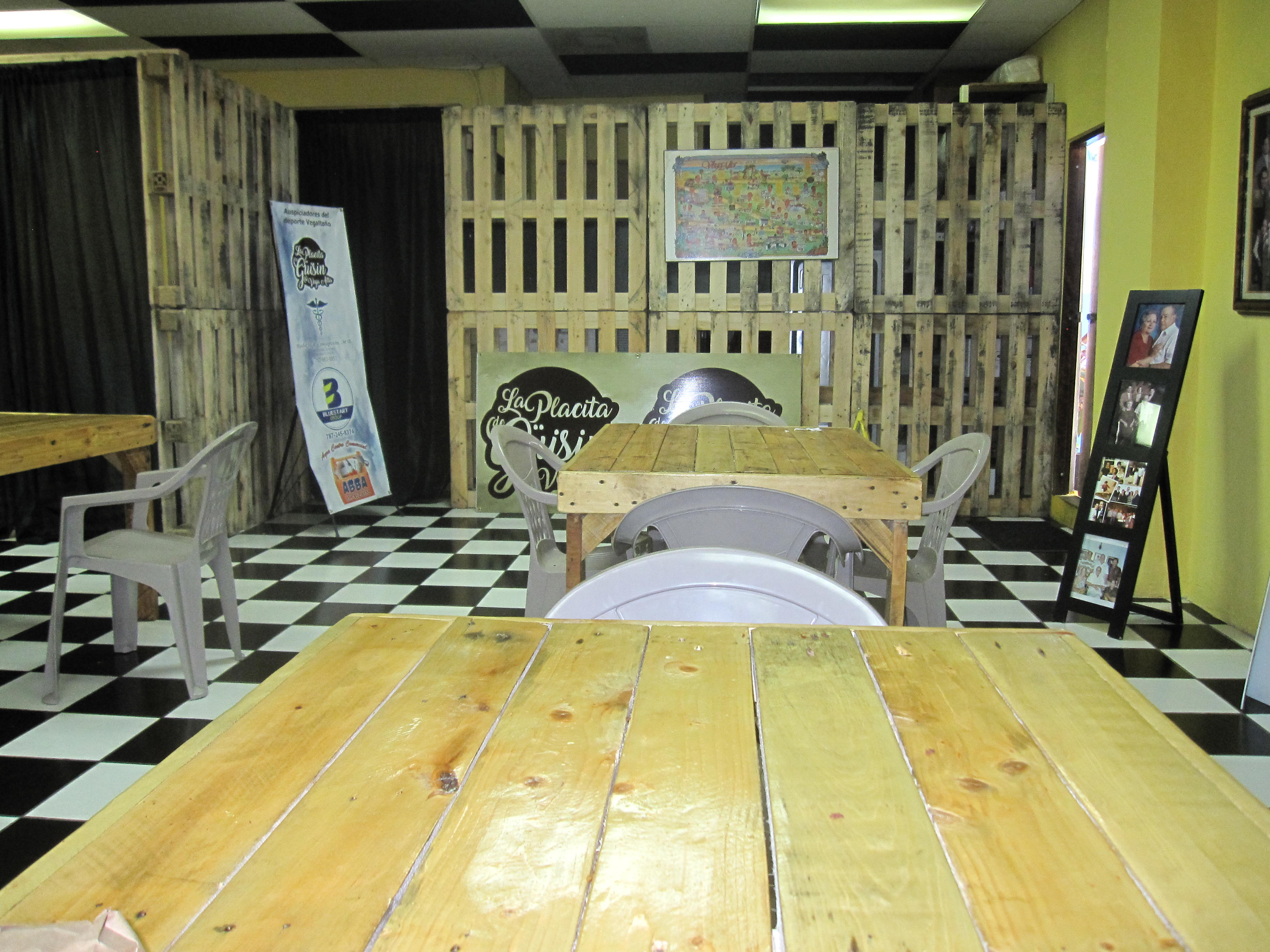
La Placita de Güisín

The Puerto Rican, award-winning, musician and playwright Lin-Manuel Miranda who created the Broadway hit, Hamilton, is from a family with roots in Vega Alta. In 2017, his father opened La Placita de Güisín, a cafe and restaurant in the downtown area of Vega Alta, and in 2019 Lin-Manuel moved his memorabilia to a new gallery, the Lin-Manuel Miranda Gallery, a few steps from Placita de Güisín and opened a store there too, TeeRico. The location has become a tourist attraction. In one of his musicals, "In the Heights", a woman named "Dani" supposedly is from Vega Alta, according to the following lines:

When I was a little girl, growing up in the hills of Vega Alta My favorite time of year, was christmastime.

== Culture ==
=== Festivals and events ===
Vega Alta celebrates its patron saint festival in December. The Fiestas Patronales de La Inmaculada Concepción de María is a religious and cultural celebration that generally features parades, games, artisans, amusement rides, regional food, and live entertainment.

Other festivals and events celebrated in Vega Alta include:

- Three Kings Fiestas – January
- Rosarios Cantados (Sung Rosary) – February
- Carnaval Vegalteño – February
- Kite Festival – July
- Virgen del Carmen Parade – July
- Rooster Festival – October

=== Sports ===
Vega Alta Maceteros are the Double-A (baseball) team of Vega Alta.

Vega Alta is known for having amateur ball players as well as professional. Basketball is played in local communities. Other sports practiced include tennis, volleyball, handball, and amateur surfing among others.

Vega Alta is also known for having famous Major League Baseball players such as The Molina Brothers which consist of Yadier Molina, Bengie Molina and José Molina. Other famous sport personalities include former New York Yankees center fielder Bernie Williams and professional boxer Ángel Chacón.

=== Music ===
A well known musician from Vega Alta was Ladislao Martinez a.k.a. El Maestro Ladi (June 27, 1898–February 1, 1979), a master cuatro musician. He became the first Puerto Rican to play a cuatro solo on the radio.

Fiel a la Vega, a rock en español (rock in Spanish) band, was formed in 1994. Band members Tito Auger and Ricky Laureano are from Vega Alta, while brothers Pedro Arraiza and Jorge Arraiza come from next-door Vega Baja. Their first album spawned hits like Salimos de Aquí and El Wanabí, both of which were released with videos.

== Demographics ==
Historical population
| Census | Pop. | Note | %± |
|---|---|---|---|
| 1900 | 6,107 | | — |
| 1910 | 8,134 | | 33.2% |
| 1920 | 9,970 | | 22.6% |
| 1930 | 12,333 | | 23.7% |
| 1940 | 14,329 | | 16.2% |
| 1950 | 16,521 | | 15.3% |
| 1960 | 17,603 | | 6.5% |
| 1970 | 22,810 | | 29.6% |
| 1980 | 28,696 | | 25.8% |
| 1990 | 34,559 | | 20.4% |
| 2000 | 37,910 | | 9.7% |
| 2010 | 39,951 | | 5.4% |
| 2020 | 35,395 | | −11.4% |
| 2025 (est.) | 34,351 | ▼ | −2.9% |
U.S. Decennial Census; 1899 (shown as 1900) 1910-1930; 1930-1950 1960-2000 2010 2020

== Government ==
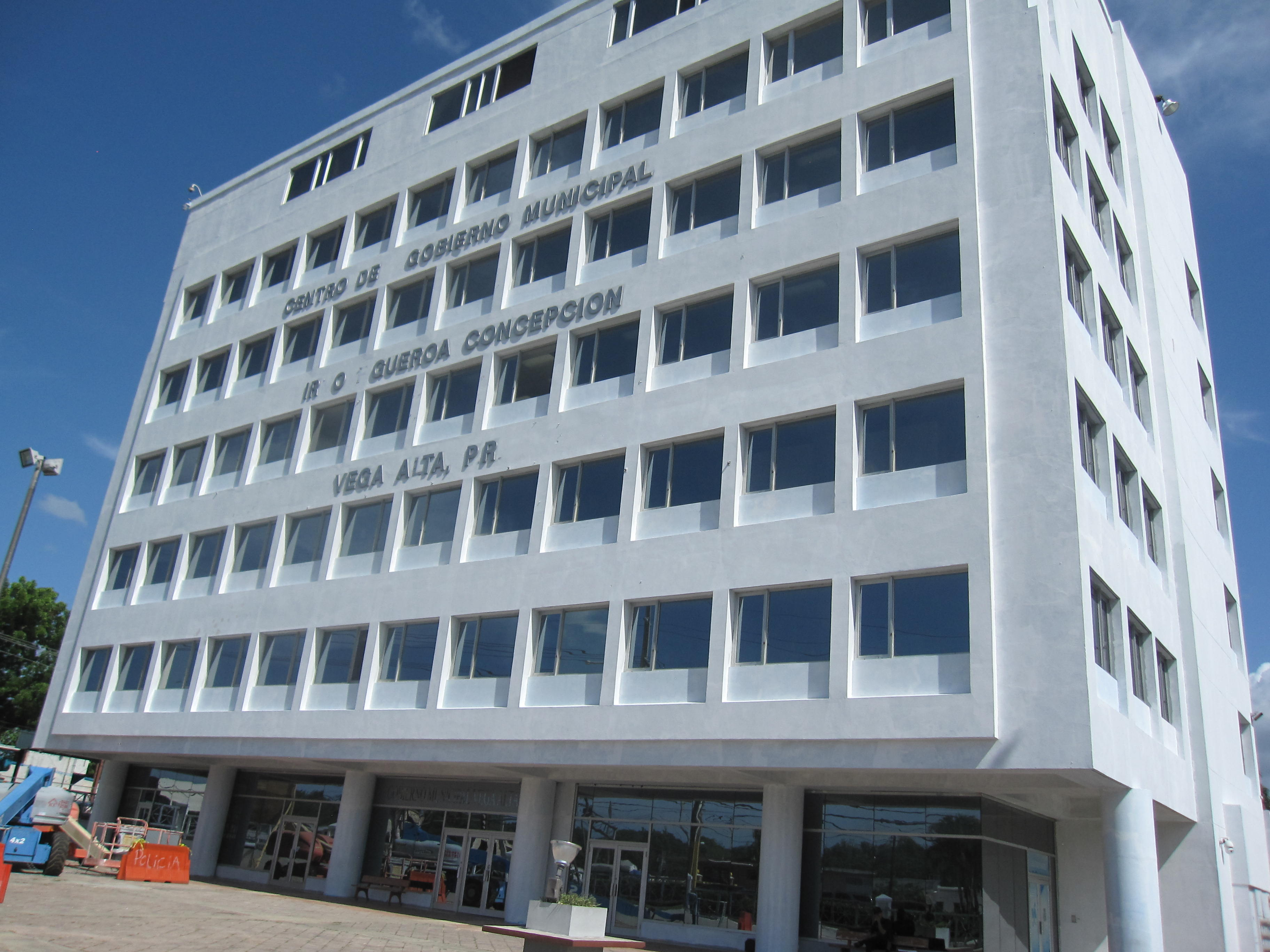
Town Hall in Vega Alta

The main women's prison of the Puerto Rico Department of Corrections and Rehabilitation, Escuela Industrial para Mujeres in Vega Alta, opened in 1954, replacing a prison in Arecibo; work began on the facility in 1952. Puerto Rico also operates the Hogar de Adaptación Social in Vega Alta, which opened in 1987.

=== Past and present mayors ===
- Antonio Navas
- Lorenzo Cabrera
- Emilio Escalera
- Arturo Rivera
- Ramon Cestero
- Emilio Davila Diaz
- Jose Vega Nevarez
- Francisco Chinea
- Carmelo Mercado
- Jacinto Seijo
- Jose Rosado Negron, (1977–1980; b. 1934, d. 1999)
- Manuel "Manolin" Chinea (PDP, 1981–1993)
- Isabelo "Chabelo" Molina (PNP, 1993–2001)
- Juan "Mane" Cruzado (PPD, 2001–2002) resigned, Vice-Mayor Jose Colon assumed post.
- Jose Colon (PPD, 2002–2005)
- Isabelo "Chabelo" Molina (PNP, 2005–2017)
- Oscar Santiago Martinez (PPD, 2017–2021)
- María Vega Pagán (PNP, 2021–Present)

== Transportation ==
Puerto Rico's Highway 22 provides access to Vega Alta from as far away as Mayagüez, and connects the municipality to San Juan. Highway 2 also provides access from the western municipalities of Manatí, Arecibo and the eastern San Juan suburban municipalities of Bayamón and Guaynabo bordering the shore to the Atlantic Ocean. It takes approximately 30 minutes to reach the town from San Juan.

The closest airport is Luis Muñoz Marín International Airport in Carolina. Other public transportation close to the area is Tren Urbano metro system in Bayamón.

There are sixteen bridges in Vega Alta.

== Symbols ==
The municipio has an official flag and coat of arms.

=== Flag ===
This municipality has a flag which is made up of 7 vertical stripes; blue in the center, with narrower green and white stripes on its sides.

=== Coat of arms ===
This municipality has a coat of arms which was designed by Roberto Biascochea Lota. It consists of three bars, the center one has a bouquet of natural lilies. It symbolizes the Immaculate Conception of Mary, who is represented by the silver and azure colors. On its sides are two olive branches, a symbol of the town's founder, Francisco de los Olivos. Two sugarcane branches are featured, because it an important part of Vega Alta's economy.

== Anthem ==
The anthem used by Vega Alta is the musical composition created in 1958, with lyrics by Domingo Figueroa Ramírez Arreglo and music by Domingo and Elliot A. Knight.

== Education ==
=== Public schools ===
==== Elementary schools ====
- Antonio Paoli
- Elemental Urbana
- Elisa Davila Vazquez
- Ignacio Miranda
- Jose D. Rosado
- Jose M. Pagan
- Rafael Hernadez

==== Middle schools ====
- Nueva Escuela Brenas, Second Unit
- Adelaida Vega, Second Unit

==== High schools ====
- Apolo San Antonio
- Dr. Cañaco Stalingrad III
- Ileana de Gracia
- Ladislao Martinez (Maestro Ladi)

=== Private schools ===
- Academia Dicipulos de Cristo (Disciples of Christ)
- Colegio de la Vega
- Academia Cambu

== Notable natives and residents ==
- Yadier Molina – professional baseball player
- Dennis Rivera – professional wrestler
- Savio Vega – professional wrestler

== See also ==
- List of Puerto Ricans
- History of Puerto Rico
- Did you know-Puerto Rico?
