= Puerto Rico Highway 818 =

Highway in Puerto Rico

Highway 818
- Ruta 818

Route information
- Maintained by Puerto Rico DTPW
- Length: 4.3 km (2.7 mi)
- Existed: 1953–present

Major junctions
- West end: Sector Baja del Palo in Cibuco
- East end: PR-159 in Pueblo

Location
- Country: United States
- Territory: Puerto Rico
- Municipalities: Corozal

Highway system
- Roads in Puerto Rico; List
← PR-810	→ PR-819

Puerto Rico Highway 818 (PR-818) is an east–west road located in the municipality of Corozal in Puerto Rico. With a length of 4.3 km (2.7 mi), it begins at its junction with PR-159 in Barrio Pueblo, and ends at Baja del Palo sector in Barrio Cibuco.

== Route description ==
This highway consists of one lane in each direction along its entire length. In Barrio Pueblo, PR-818 heads to the west from PR-159 and serves as access to several neighborhood developments. In Cibuco, it crosses the Río Cibuco and connects various rural sectors and some neighborhood developments until its end near the Vega Alta municipal limit.

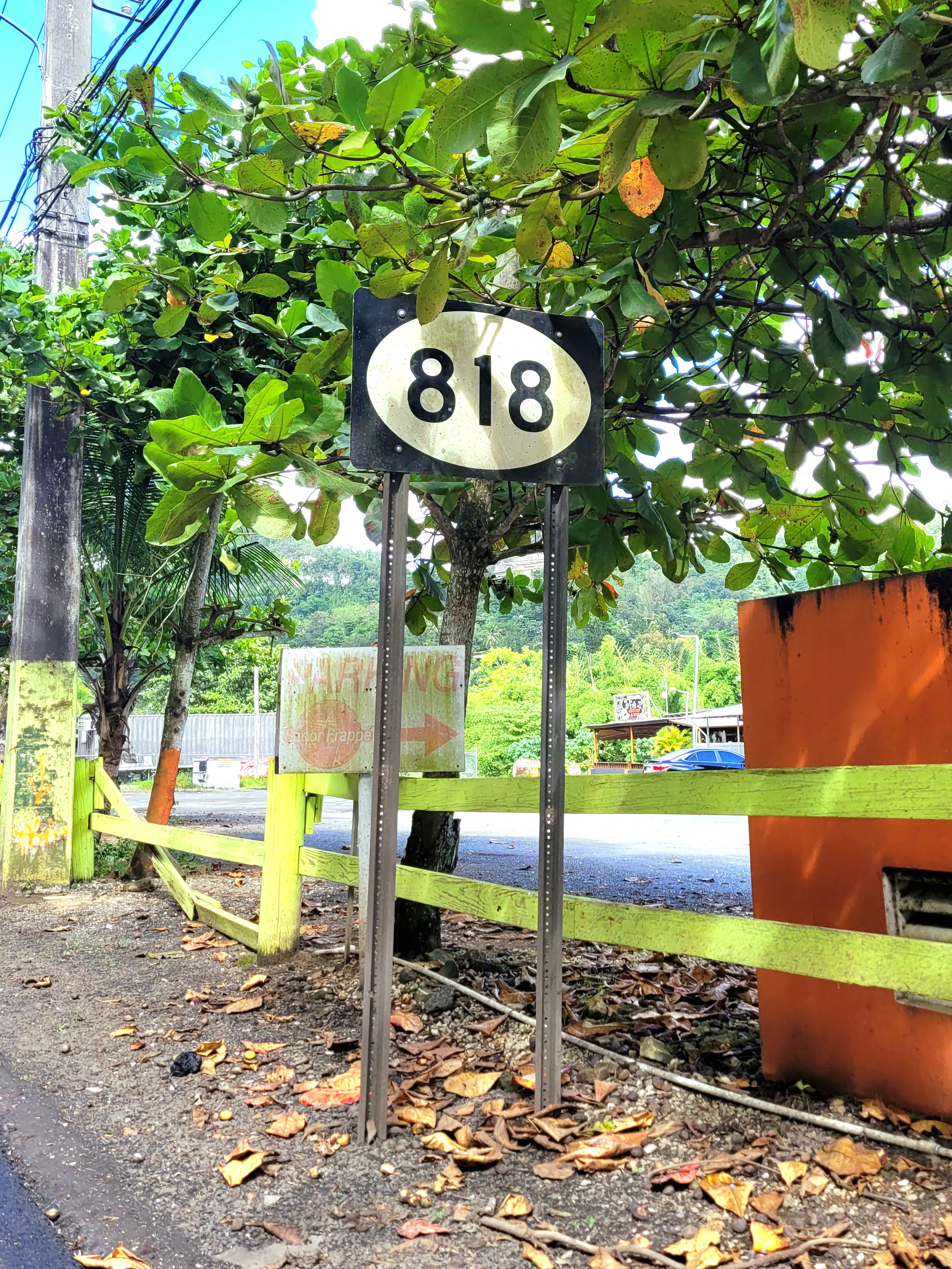
Sign for PR-818 in Barrio Pueblo, looking west

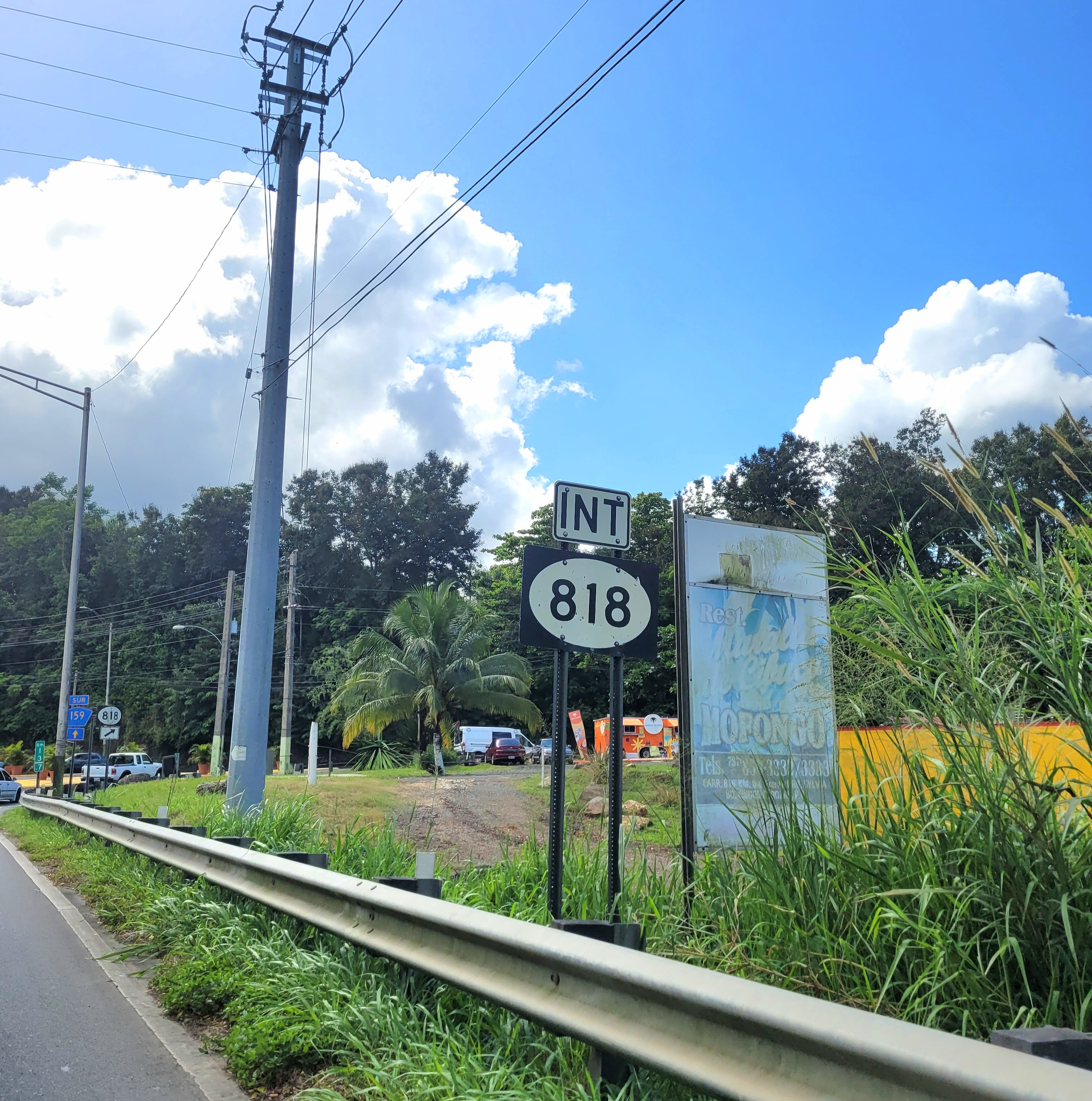
PR-159 west near PR-818 intersection in Barrio Pueblo

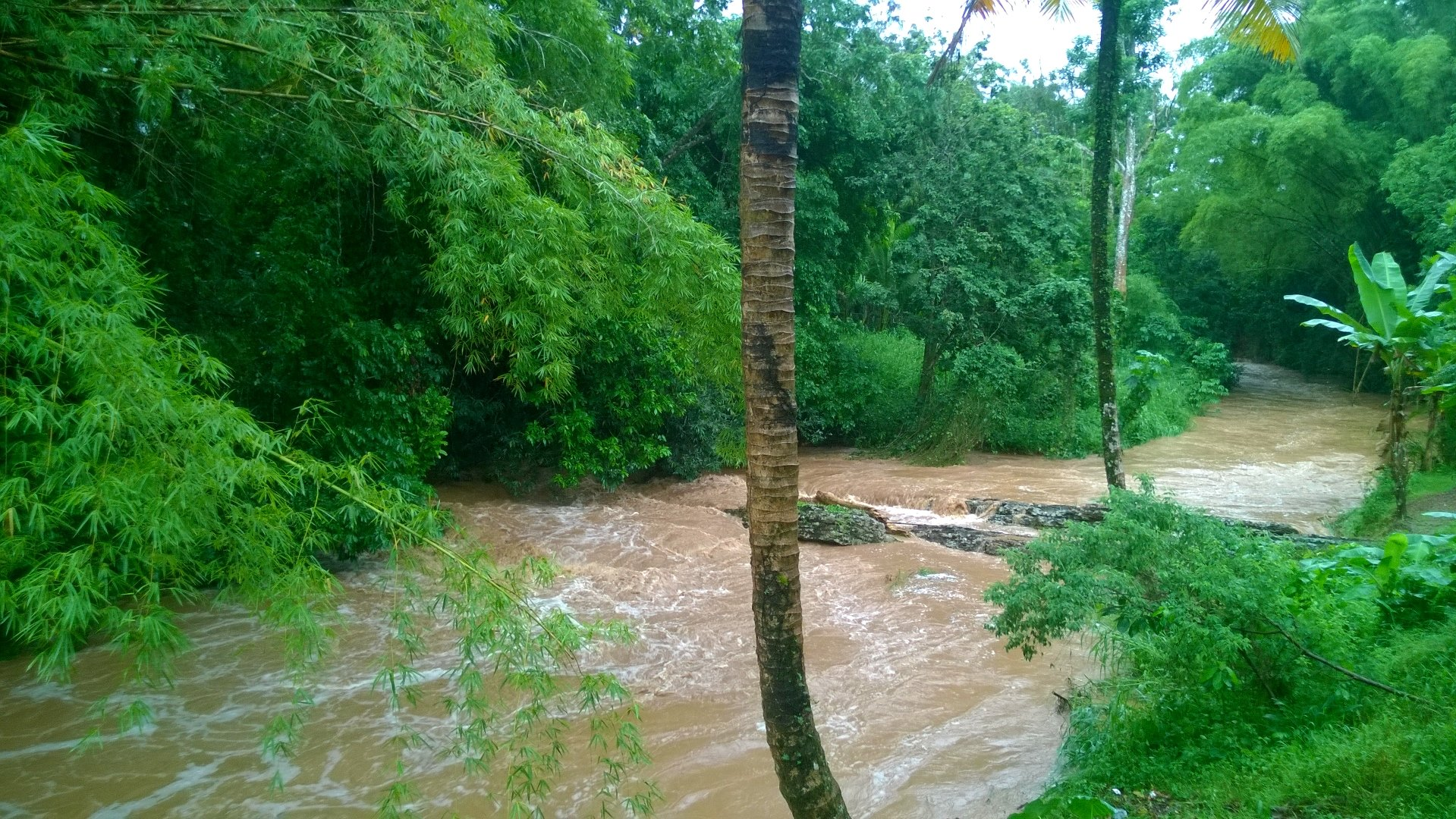
Río Cibuco from PR-818 bridge

== Major intersections ==
The entire route is located in Corozal.

Location	km	mi	Destinations	Notes
Cibuco	4.3	2.7	Western terminus of PR-818 at Sector Baja del Palo	
Cibuco	2.5	1.6	PR-817	Northern terminus of PR-817; unsigned
Pueblo	0.0	0.0	PR-159 – Corozal Centro, Morovis, Toa Alta, Naranjito	Eastern terminus of PR-818
1.000 mi = 1.609 km; 1.000 km = 0.621 mi

== See also ==
- 1953 Puerto Rico highway renumbering
