= Monte Choca State Forest =

State forest in Puerto Rico

Monte Choca State Forest Spanish: Bosque Estatal de Monte Choca

Geography
- Location: Corozal, Puerto Rico
- Elevation: 1,350 feet (410 m)
- Area: 244.76 cuerdas (237.72 acres)

Administration
- Authority: Puerto Rico DRNA

Ecology
- Ecosystem: Second-growth Subtropical Moist Zone forest
- WWF Classification: Puerto Rican moist forests

Monte Choca State Forest (in Spanish: Bosque Estatal de Monte Choca) is a 244.6-acre (0.990 km^{2}), tropical moist forest, located in the municipality of Corozal in Puerto Rico. It is owned and managed by the Puerto Rico Department of Natural and Environmental Resources (DRNA) of the commonwealth of Puerto Rico and co-managed by local community and conservation groups. The forest today is famous for a large bamboo grove popularly known as Bamboo Cathedral (Catedral de Bambú).

== History ==
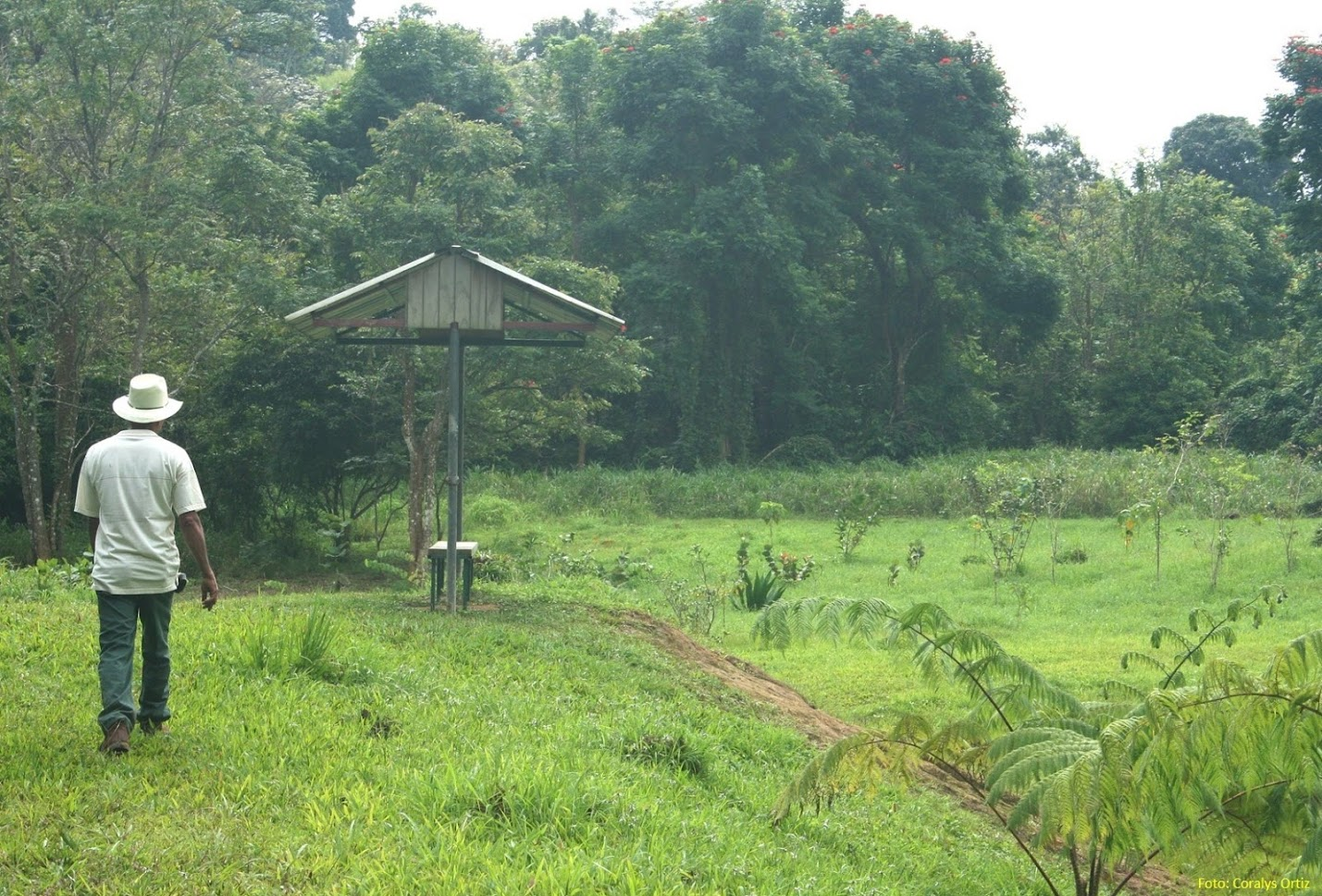
Monte Choca (DRNA)

Gold was extracted from this region during the colonization of Puerto Rico by Spain. The forest in the area was later cleared for the development of agriculture, but later grew back in the form of a secondary forest. The territory was private property acquired by Don Eliodoro Blanco in the 1920s or 1930s, who developed a small farm and left the rest of the property intact with the intention of protecting the forest. The name Monte Choca is said to come from one of Eliodoro Blanco's employees, Asunción Santiago, who was nicknamed Don Choca. Mr. Blanco, who dedicated a large part of his life to Don Blanco's farm and became its primary groundskeeper, was also very fond of the forest, which was soon nicknamed Monte de Don Choca by the local community.

Interest in the protection of the area officially began in 1999 when the local Palos Blancos Environmental Civic Club (Club Cívico Ambiental de Palos Blancos) prevented the demolition of the secondary forest by private corporations intended on developing real estate in the area. Researchers from the DRNA documented the successful establishment of a long-lived secondary forest in former agricultural lands of the area, and the importance of protecting the unpolluted crystalline headwaters of the Mavilla-Cibuco River basin. Monte Choca State Forest was officially declared a state forest with Law number 295, passed on November 21, 2003. A study to consider strategies for the development of ecotourism at Monte Choca State Forest was done by Ortiz Ramos Hecmarie in 2011.

== Geography ==
The protected forest has an area of about 244.76 acres and it is located in barrio Palos Blancos, at one of the highest elevations of the municipality of Corozal. The forest is crossed by various minor creeks belonging to the Mavilla River basin, itself a tributary of the Cibuco River. Charca Eliodoro Blanco is a natural pool formed by one of these streams.

== Ecology ==
=== Flora ===
The area was previously used for the cultivation of minor fruits, remnants of which can still be found in thickets and pastures within the secondary forest. A total of 140 plant species, both native and introduced, have been identified, most of which are trees and shrubs. These were classified as endemic, native to the region, and exotic. Among the species of trees and native shrubs identified are granadillo, aguacatillo, locustberries, Casearia arborea, Cecropia schreberiana and Miconia prasina. In addition to the bamboo, one of the most famous plant residents of the forest is a centenary ceiba tree nicknamed La Ceiba de Choca, described by the local community as a symbol of the environmental protection of the forest.

=== Fauna ===
The forest is home to at least 57 species of birds, both native and migratory. The most common birds found at Monte Choca State Forest are the bananaquit, the Puerto Rican vireo, the Puerto Rican oriole, the Puerto Rican woodpecker, the Puerto Rican tody, the Puerto Rican bullfinch, the Puerto Rican lizard cuckoo and the Zenaida dove. Amphibians found here are cane toads and white-lipped frogs. Reptiles found here include Puerto Rican anoles, Puerto Rican ameivas, Puerto Rican worm lizards, Puerto Rican racers, and Puerto Rican boas.

== Tourism ==
=== Bamboo Cathedral ===
The Bamboo Cathedral (Catedral de Bambú) is a large grove of common bamboo (Bambusa vulgaris) located at one of the lowest elevations of the forest. Despite the occurrence of various bamboo species in the Americas, no native bamboo existed in Puerto Rico prior to the 15th century. Although bamboo might have been brought to Puerto Rico at a previous time, the earliest evidence of bamboo comes from the 18th and 19th centuries, brought by the Spanish to mitigate rapid erosion that affects both crops and roads along the mountainous areas of the island. This bamboo grove is also famous for its rare blooms, which only happen every 80 to 100 years. The last bamboo flower bloom in the Bamboo Cathedral happened in 2014. Similar bamboo groves can be seen at the USDA Tropical Agriculture Station of Mayagüez, the Caguas Botanical Garden, and in the form of the Bamboo Chapel (Capilla de Bambú), which was planted in 1971 the University of Puerto Rico Botanical Garden in San Juan.

=== Recreation ===
Photography, hiking, scientific research, and bird watching take place at Monte Choca State Forest. Youth camps are held at Monte Choca.

The Civic and Cultural Recreational Club of Palos Blancos (in Spanish: Club Cívico Recreativo y Cultural de Palos Blancos) is in Monte Choca State Forest, and they maintain a visitor center located at the local community center.

== See also ==
- List of Puerto Rico state forests
- List of National Natural Landmarks in Puerto Rico
