= Cibuco =

Cibuco may refer to:

- Cibuco, Corozal, Puerto Rico, a barrio in Puerto Rico
- Cibuco, Vega Baja, Puerto Rico, a barrio in Puerto Rico
- Cibuco River, a river in Puerto Rico
