= Emilio R. Delgado =

- Born: April 14, 1901; Corozal, Puerto Rico
- Died: 1967 (aged 65–66); New York, New York
- Occupations: poet, journalist

Emilio R. Delgado Rodríguez (April 14, 1901 – 1967) was a poet and a journalist born in Corozal, Puerto Rico. He later moved to New York.

== Published work ==
Tiempos Del Amor Breve. New York: Las Américas Publishing, 1958.

Anthology. Vicente Géigel Polanco, compiler.

San Juan: Instituto de Cultura Puertorriqueña. 1976

== Unpublished Work ==
Cuentos para los Niños de España (1937)

Cuentos Puertorriqueños (1955)

Estudios de Folklore Puertorriqueño (1960)

Crónicas y Croniquillas

Canciones de la Pájara Pinta

Poesía Festiva

== Journals ==
Faro (1926)

Vórtice (1927)

Hostos (hostos) (1928)

== Legacy ==
A high school in Corozal, Puerto Rico was named after Emilio R. Delgado.
