= Paso del Indio Site =

- U.S. National Register of Historic Places
- Location: Vega Baja, Puerto Rico
- NRHP reference No.: 07000583
- Added to NRHP: July 25, 2007

Paso del Indio Site, also known as VB-4, is an archeological site in Vega Baja, Puerto Rico. It was listed on the U.S. National Register of Historic Places in 2007.

It is located about 4 miles (6.4 km) from the Atlantic Ocean on the west bank of the Rio Indio. It is "the largest and deepest stratified (approximately 5 m in depth) multi-component prehistoric occupation site discovered to date in Puerto Rico, and possibly all Caribbean islands."

== See also ==
- List of Puerto Rican scientists and inventors § Archaeology
