= Indio River =

River of Puerto Rico

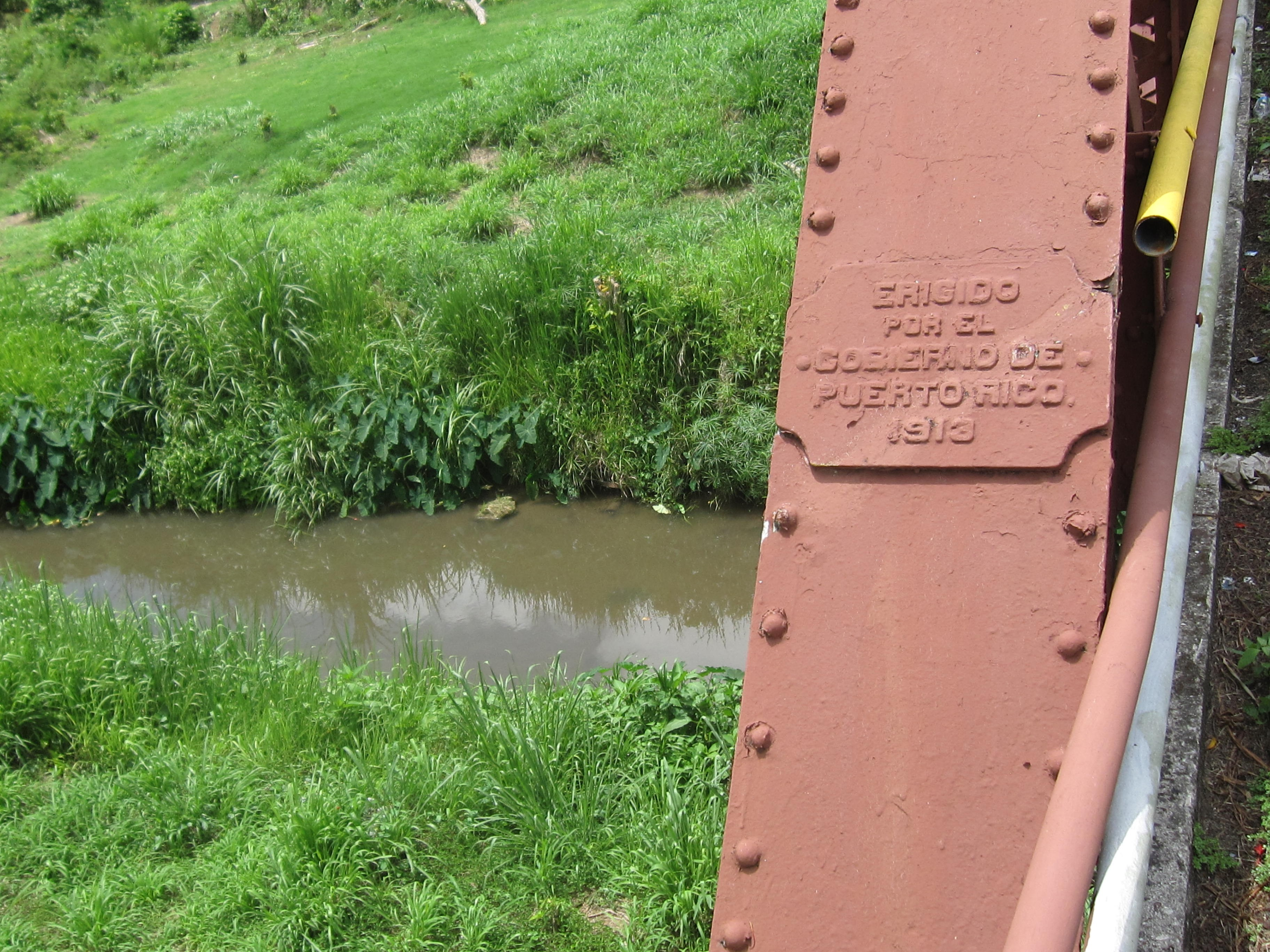
- Río Indio under Red Bridge in Morovis Norte

- Location within Puerto Rico
- Native name: Río Indio (Spanish)

Location
- Commonwealth: Puerto Rico
- Municipality: Morovis, and Vega Baja

Physical characteristics
- Source
  - coordinates: 18.4407801°N 66.3682253°W
  - elevation: 23 ft.
- Mouth: Cibuco River

The Indio River (Spanish: Río Indio) is a river of Vega Baja and Morovis in Puerto Rico. Indio River is located in the Northern Karst Belt, carving into mogotes along its course. Indio River, a tributary of the Cibuco River, is quick to rise and causes flooding when there is heavy rain.

== Paso del Indio ==
An important archeological site, Paso del Indio, is located on the west bank of Río Indio in Vega Baja. Discovered when highway PR-22 was being built, it contained artifacts and bones carbon dated to 2580 BCE.

== Gallery ==
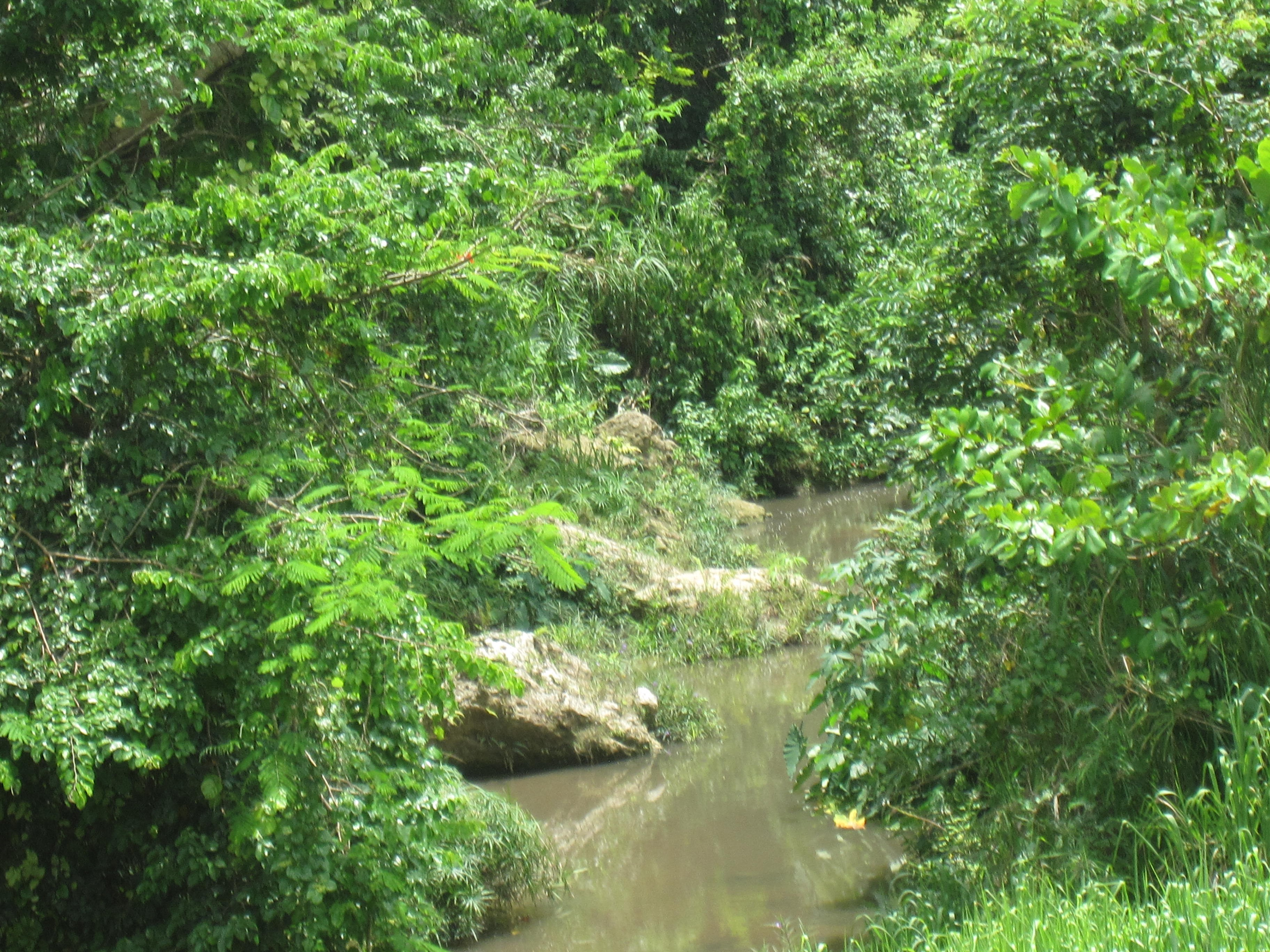
Río Indio in Morovis Norte, near the "Red bridge" El Puente Colorado which was erected in 1913

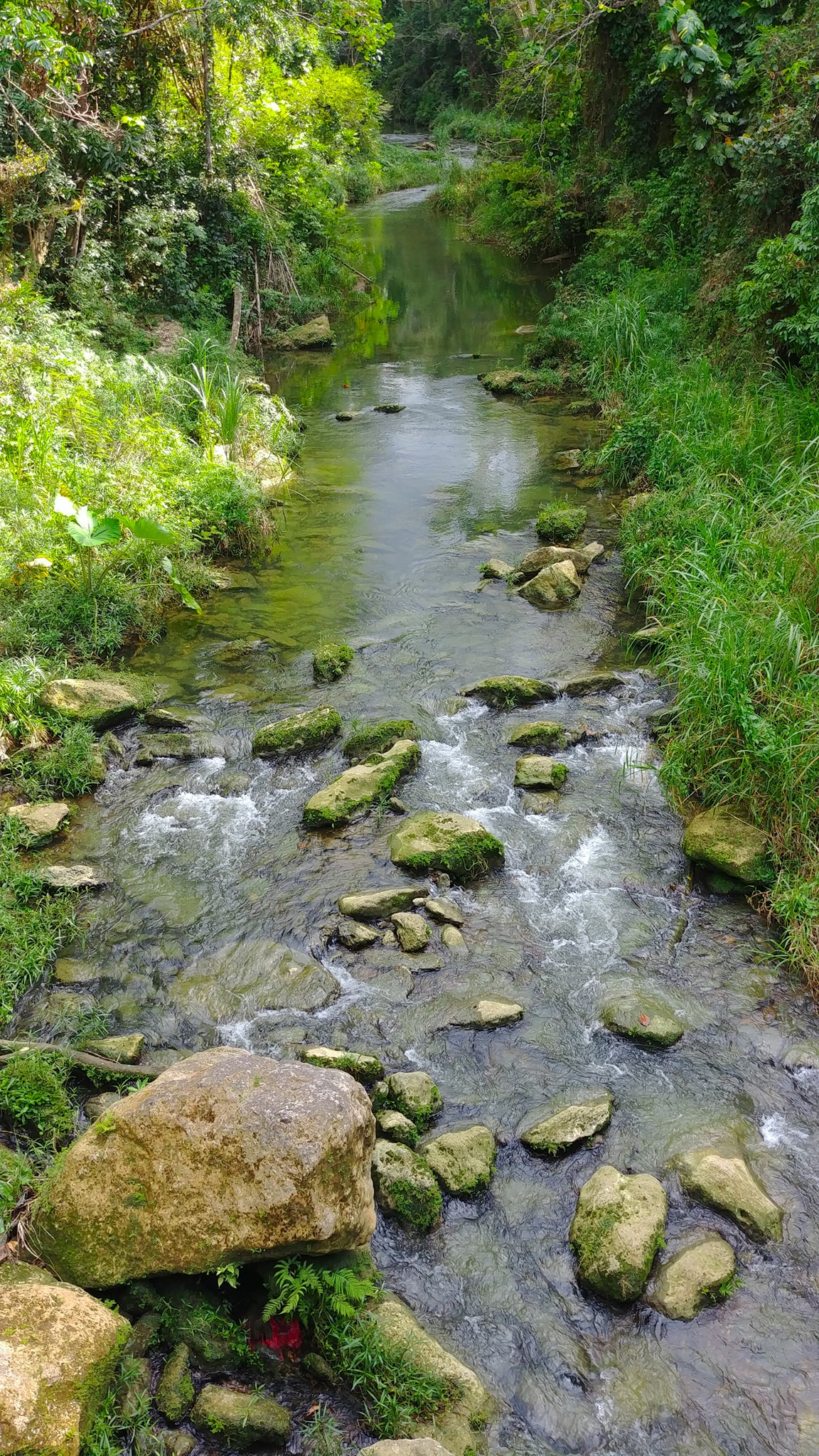
Río Indio in Quebrada Arenas barrio

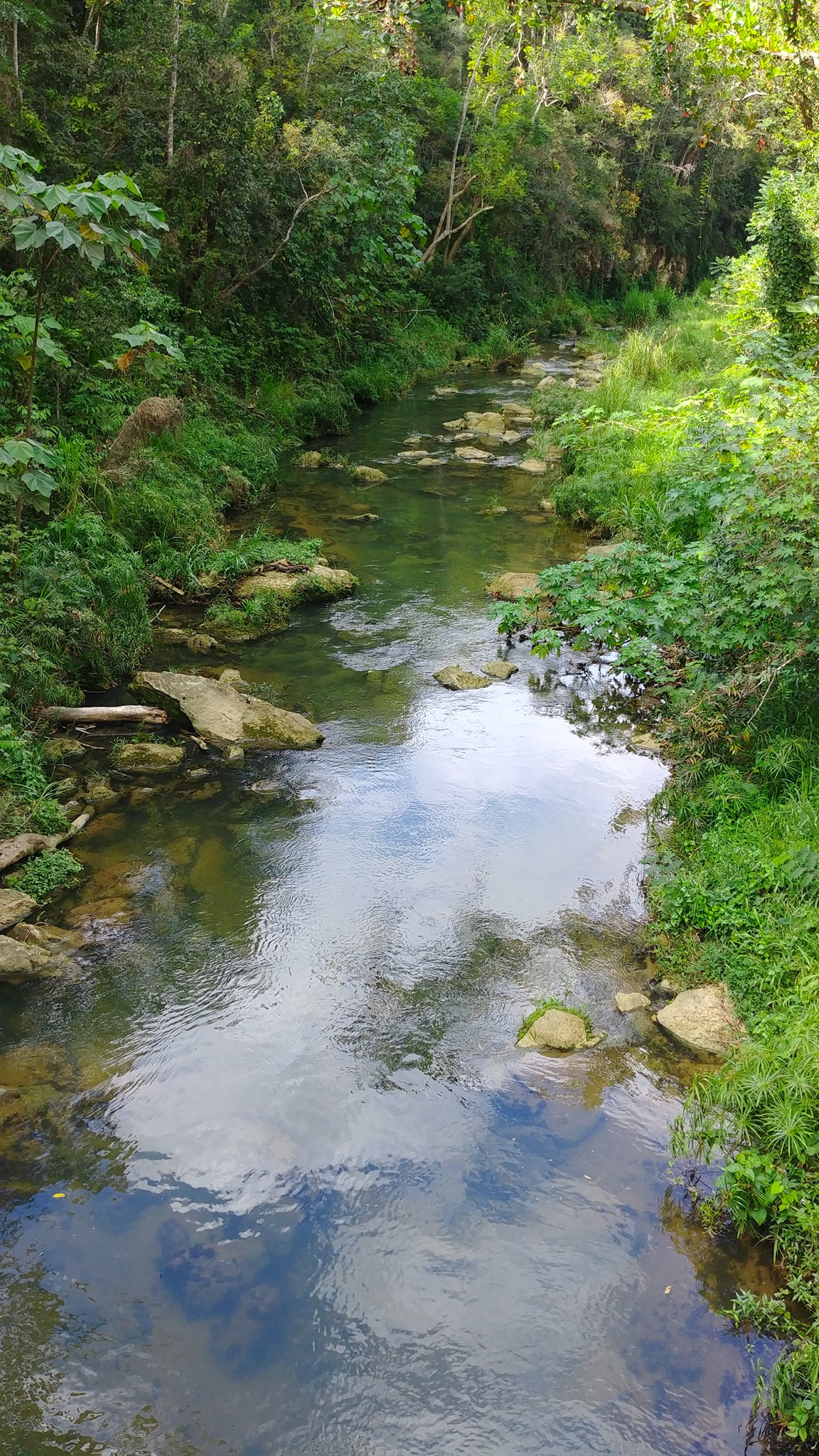
Río Indio in Almirante Sur barrio

== See also ==
- Paso del Indio Site: archeological site along the river
- List of rivers of Puerto Rico
