= Corozal River =

River of Puerto Rico

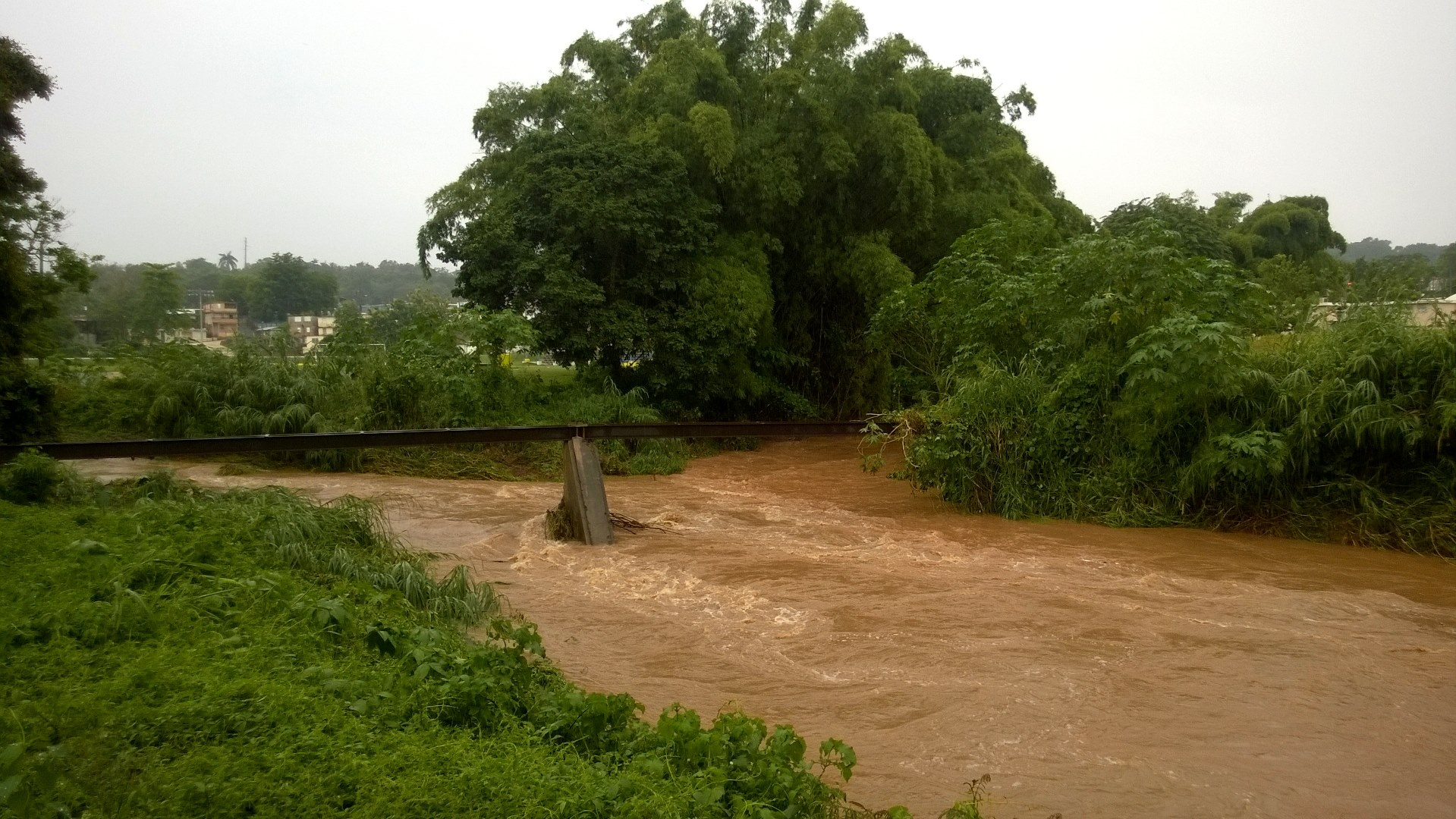
- Union of the Negros (left) and Corozal (right) rivers after a rainy day
- Native name: Río Corozal (Spanish)

Location
- Commonwealth: Puerto Rico
- Municipality: Corozal

Physical characteristics
- Source
  - coordinates: 18.3502284°N 66.3340582°W
  - elevation: 194 ft.

The Corozal River (Spanish: Río Corozal) is a river of Corozal, Puerto Rico.

== See also ==
- List of rivers of Puerto Rico
