= Cibuco River =

River of Puerto Rico

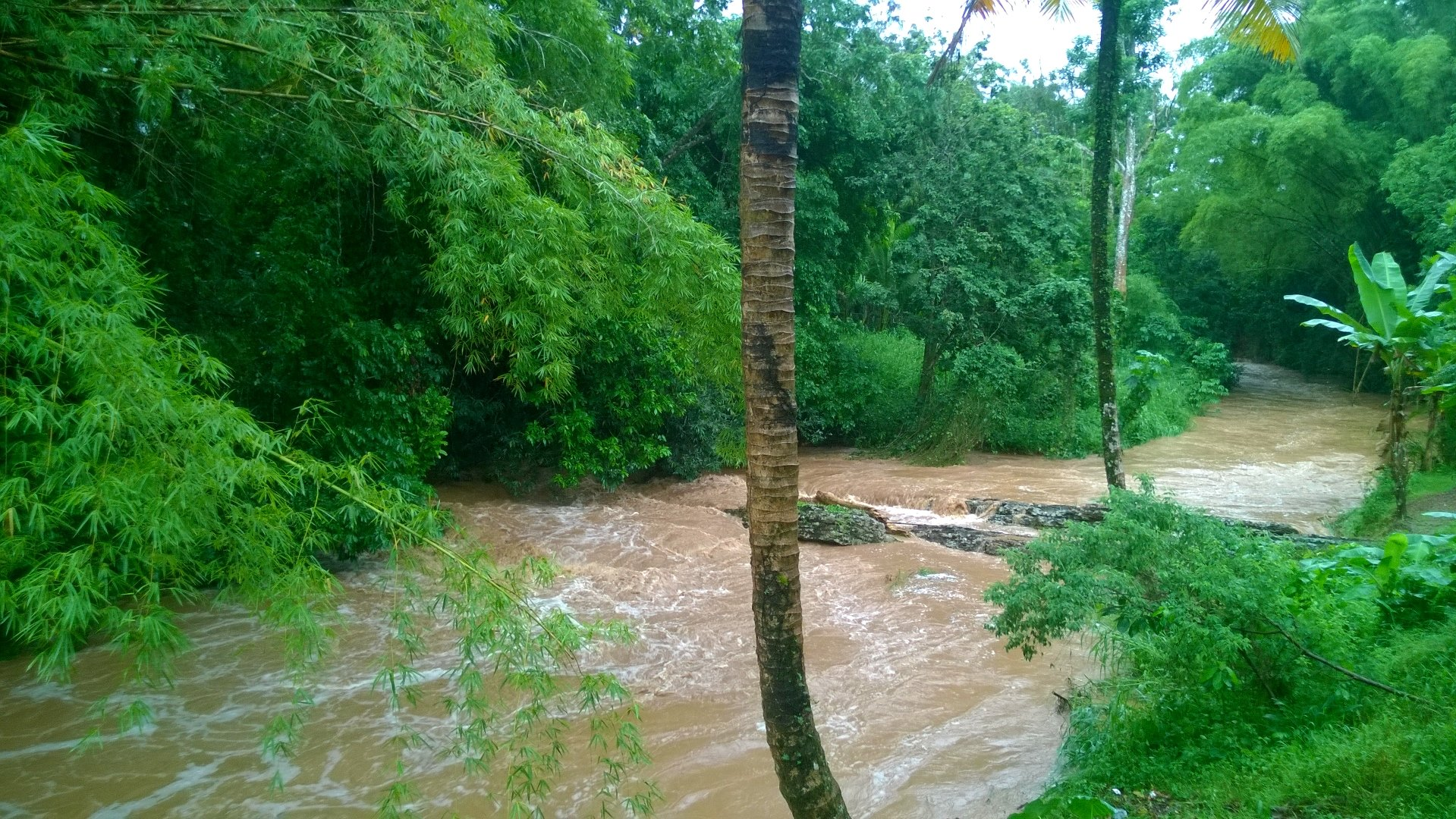
- Cibuco River during a rainy day in Cibuco barrio

- Native name: Río Cibuco (Spanish)

Location
- Commonwealth: Puerto Rico
- Municipalities: Corozal, Vega Alta and Vega Baja

Physical characteristics
- Source
  - coordinates: 18.4860558°N 66.3782254°W
- Mouth: Atlantic Ocean
- Length: 23.75 miles
- Basin size: 91.57 sq mi

The Cibuco River (Spanish: Río Cibuco) is a river located in northern Puerto Rico. The river has its source in the municipality of Corozal and flows through Vega Alta and Vega Baja municipalities, where its mouth is located, at Cibuco Bay. The Cibuco is about 23.75 miles long, with notable tributaries being the Indio, Mavilla and Corozal Rivers. The river also feeds into the Cibuco Swamp, one of the largest swamps in Puerto Rico which today is protected as a nature reserve.

The river flooded up to 15 feet during Hurricane Maria in some neighborhoods and as late as 2019, the river floods when rains are heavy.

== See also ==
- List of rivers of Puerto Rico
