= Corozal, Puerto Rico =

Town and municipality in Puerto Rico

Corozal Municipio Autónomo de Corozal
- Town and Municipality
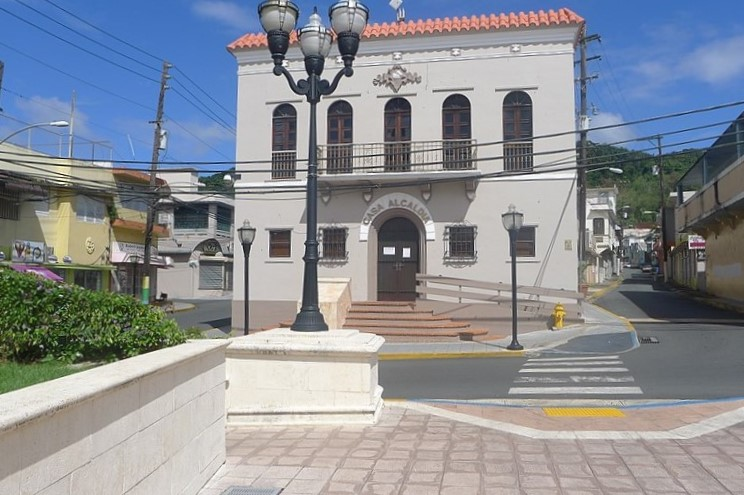
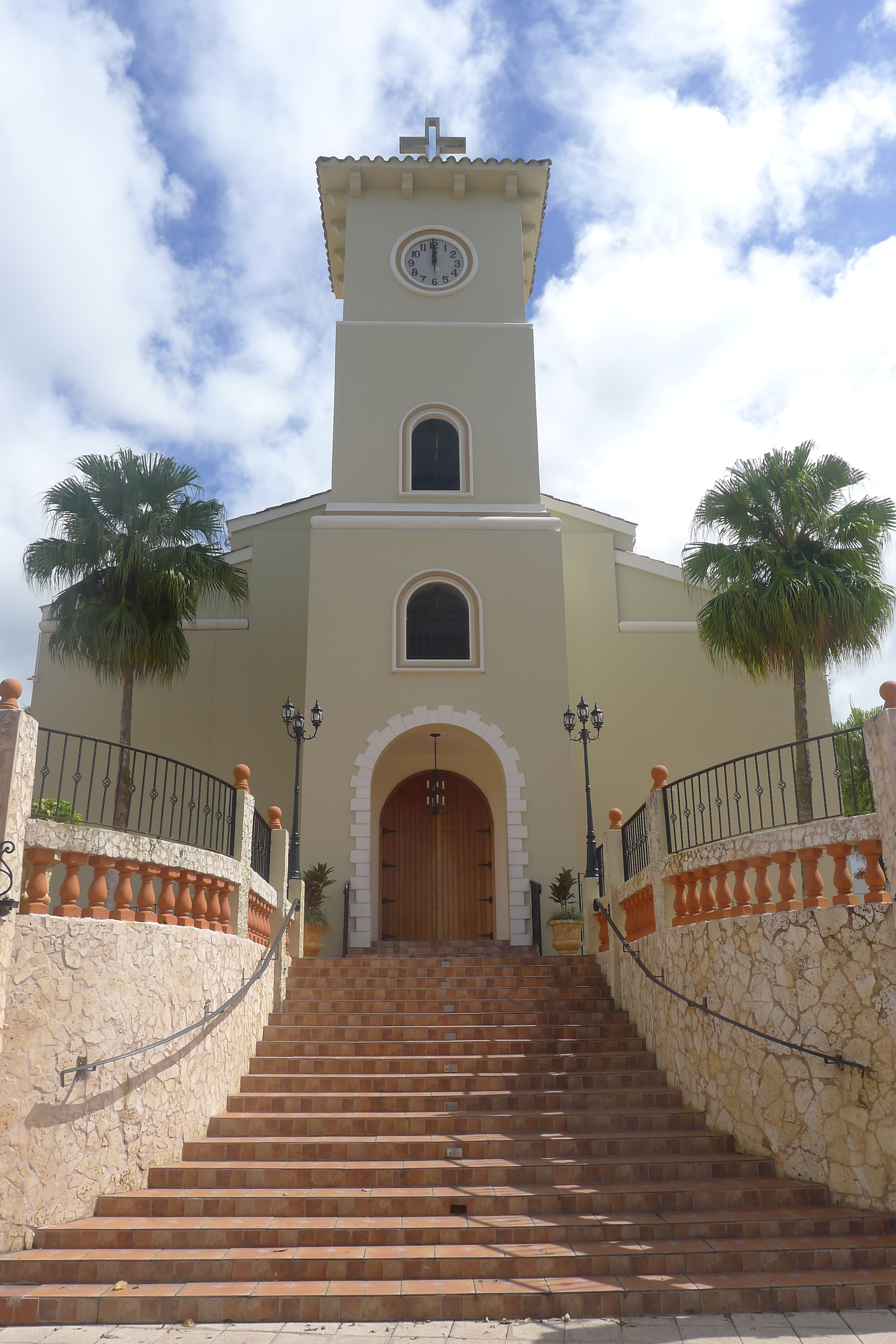
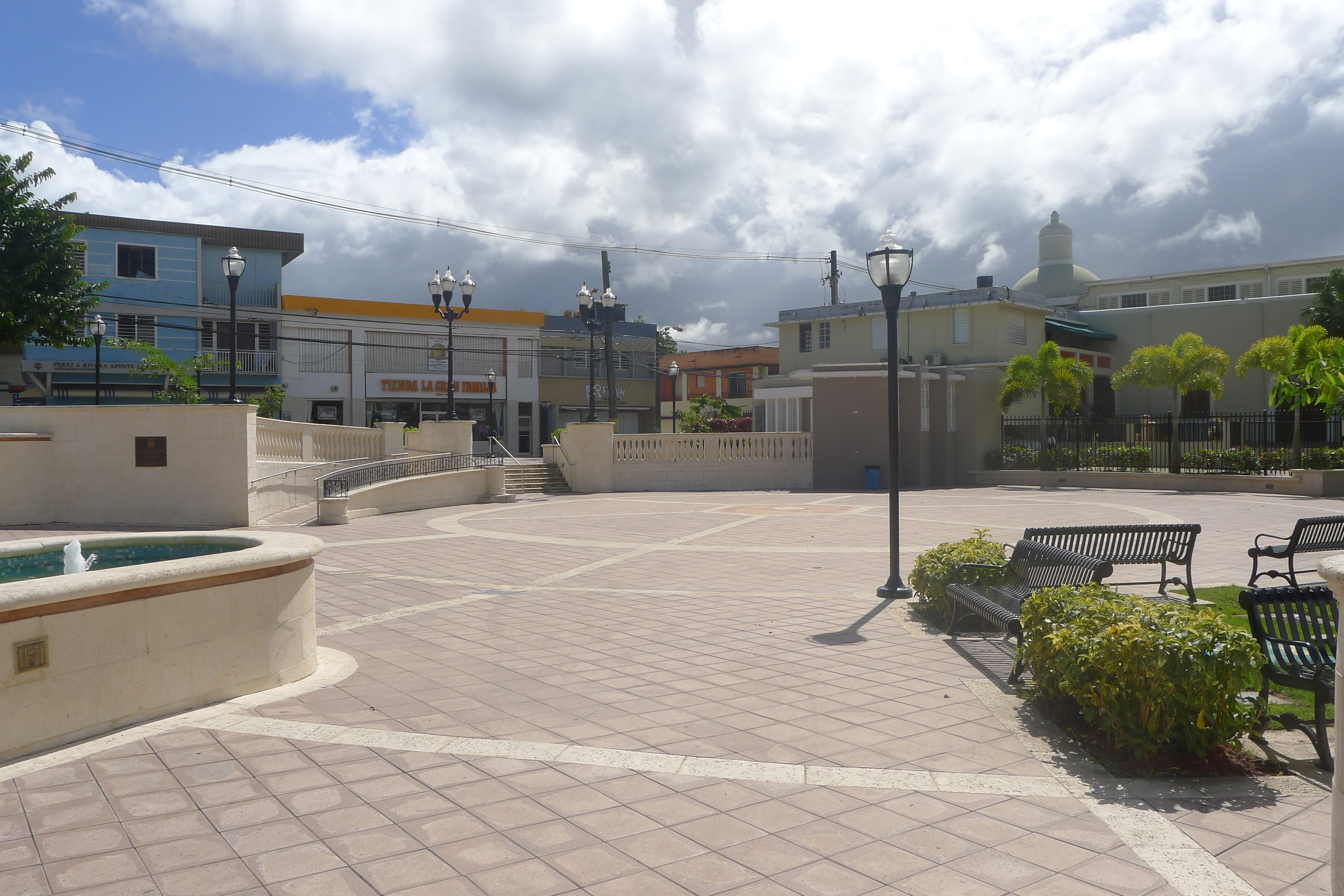
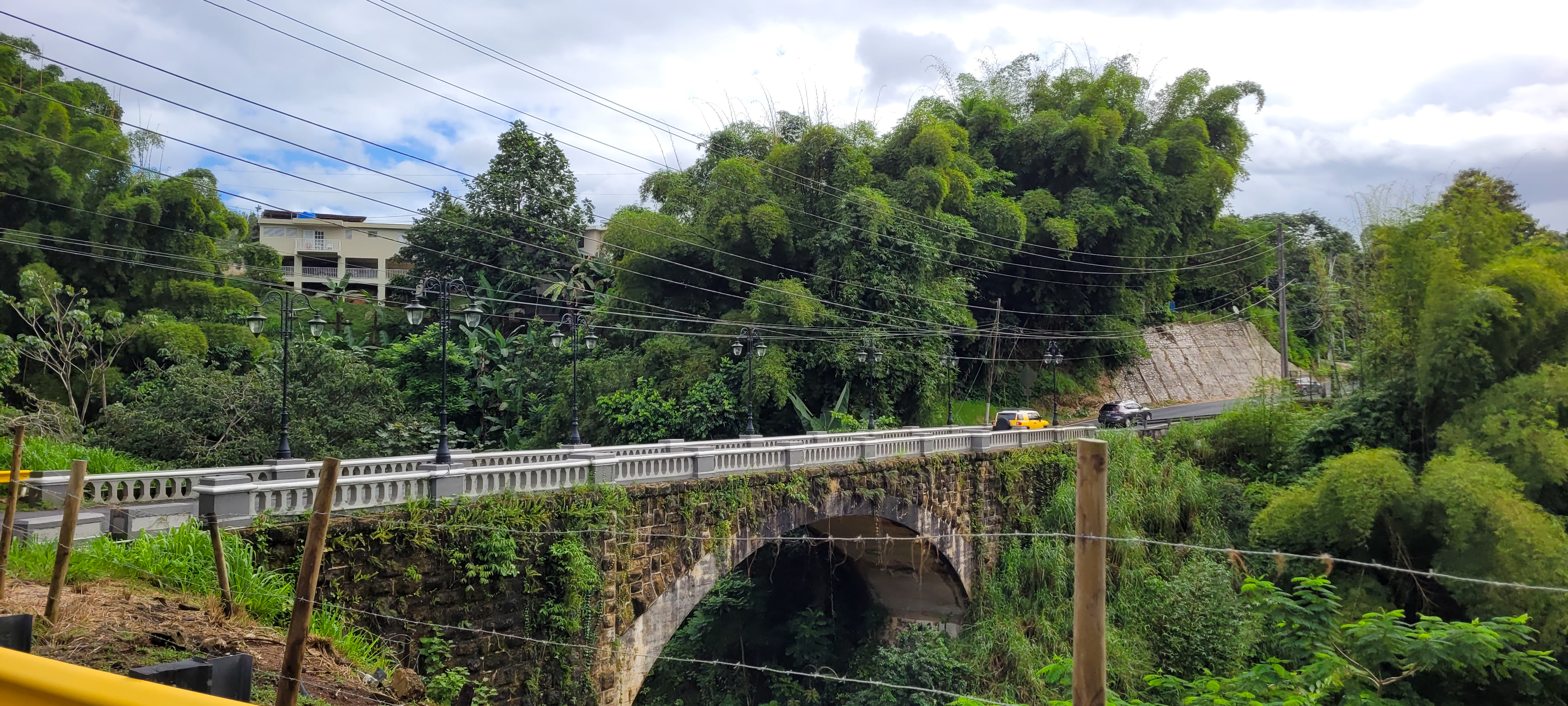
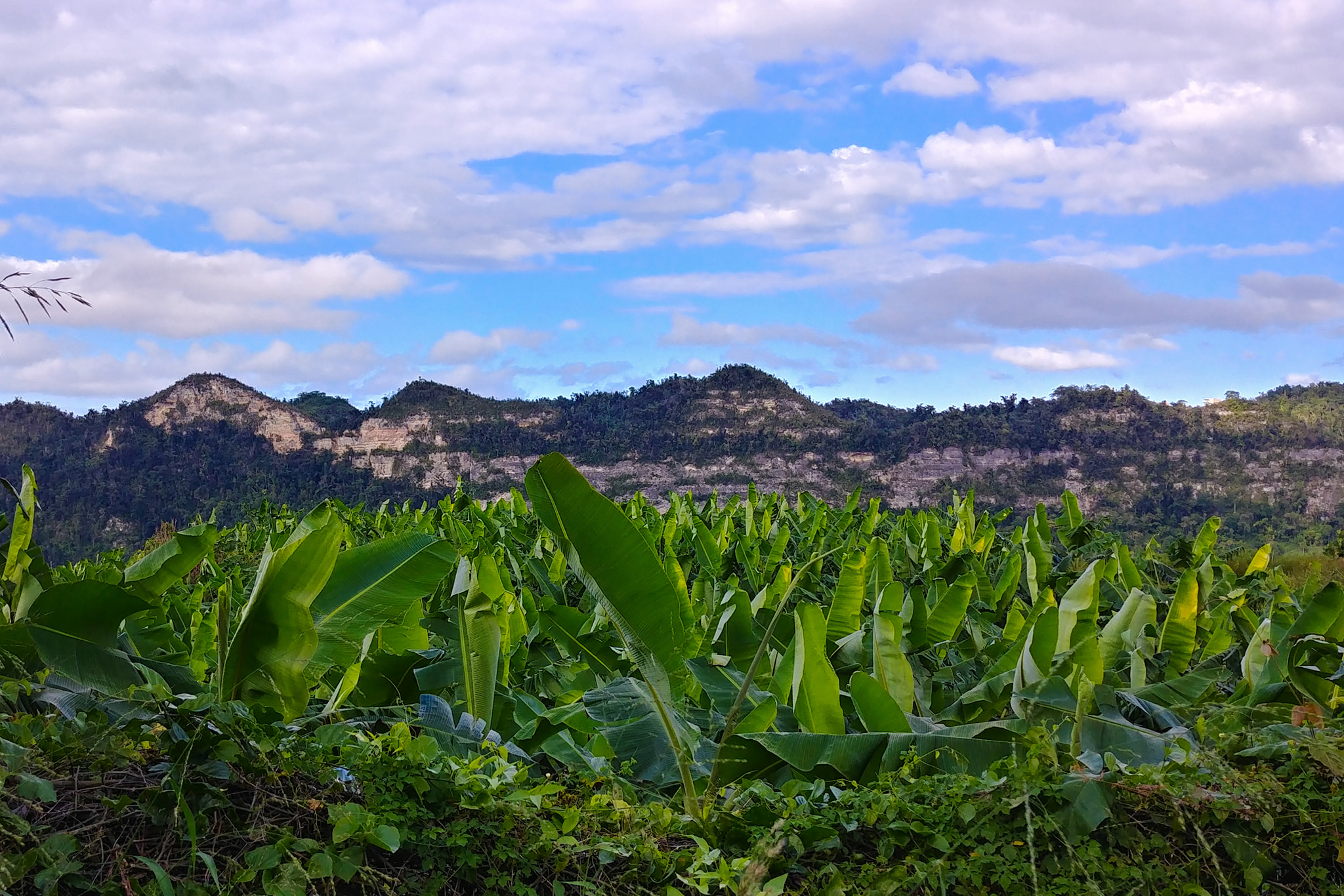
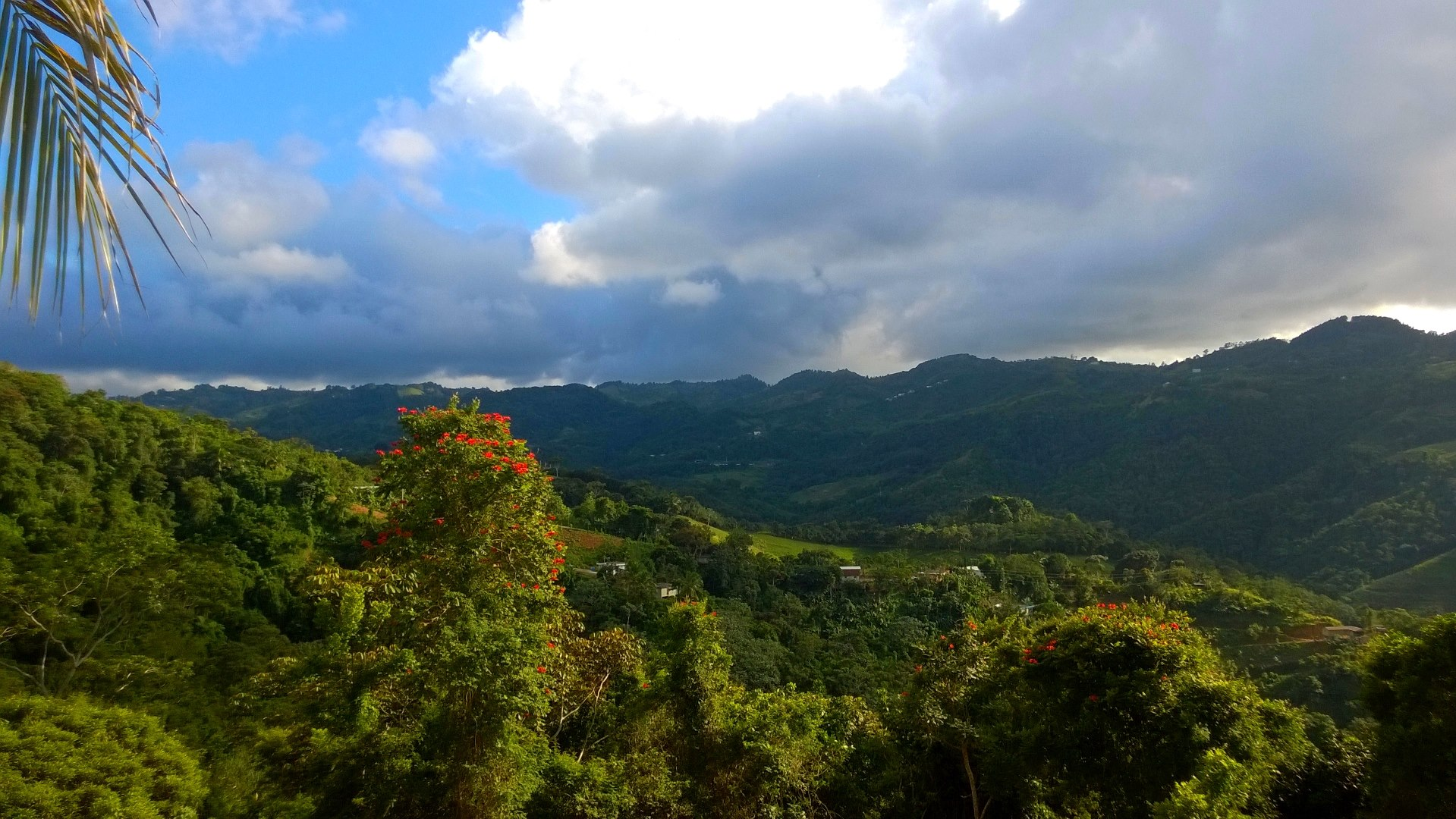
- From top, left to right: Corozal city hall in downtown Corozal; Parroquia Sagrada Familia (Sacred Family Parish); Town square of Corozal; historic Mavilla Bridge; and Panoramic mountainous views from barrios Cibuco and Magueyes

- Flag Coat of arms
- Nicknames: "La Capital del Voleibol", "Los Plataneros"
- Anthem: "En Dios y Corozal todos unidos"
- Map of Puerto Rico highlighting Corozal Municipality
- Coordinates: 18°20′30″N 66°19′1″W
- Sovereign state: United States
- Commonwealth: Puerto Rico
- Founded: April 27, 1795
- Founder: Francisco de Neve
- Barrios: 13 barrios: Abras; Cibuco; Corozal barrio-pueblo; Cuchillas; Dos Bocas; Magueyes; Maná; Negros; Padilla; Palmarejo; Palmarito; Palos Blancos; Pueblo

Government
  - Mayor: Luis “Luiggi” García (PNP)
  - Senatorial dist.: 6 - Guayama
  - Representative dist.: 28

Area
  - Total: 42 sq mi (109 km^{2})
  - Land: 42 sq mi (109 km^{2})
  - Water: 0 sq mi (0 km^{2})

Population (2020)
  - Total: 34,571
  - Estimate (2025): 34,531 ▼
  - Rank: 35th in Puerto Rico
  - Density: 821/sq mi (317/km^{2})
- Demonym: Corozaleños
- Time zone: UTC−4 (AST)
- ZIP Code: 00783
- Area code: 787/939

Corozal (Spanish pronunciation: [koɾoˈsal]) is a town and municipality of Puerto Rico located in the central-eastern region, north of Orocovis and Barranquitas; south of Vega Alta; southwest of Toa Alta; east of Morovis and Orocovis; and west of Naranjito. Corozal is spread over 12 barrios and Corozal Pueblo (the downtown area and the administrative center of the city). It is part of the San Juan-Caguas-Guaynabo Metropolitan Statistical Area.

The city name is derived from the "palma de corozo" (grugru palm, Acrocomia media) which abounds in the Cordillera Central zone of the island.

== History ==
Corozal's local Taino Indian Cacique (Chief) was named Orocobix and his tribe was known as the Jatibonicu Taino.

Corozal was founded in 1795 and officially became a town in 1804. Commonly known as La Cuna del Volibol or Volleyball's Cradle. It takes its name from the Acrocomia media, in Puerto Rican Spanish: palma de corozo.

Puerto Rico was ceded by Spain in the aftermath of the Spanish–American War under the terms of the Treaty of Paris of 1898 and became a territory of the United States. In 1899, the United States Department of War conducted a census of Puerto Rico finding that the population of Corozal was 11,508.

From 1902 to 1905 Corozal became one with Toa Alta, an adjoining municipality.

In 2000 census the population of Corozal was 36,867, and it had a land area of 43 sq mi (111 km^{2}).

Intense wind and rainfall from Hurricane Maria on September 20, 2017, triggered numerous landslides in Corozal, and bridges and homes were destroyed. Some residents of Corozal had to resort to collecting spring water as access to potable water was limited after the devastation caused by the hurricane. During the event, the police station in Corozal suddenly became flooded by the Cibuco River while there were nineteen officers inside. The officers climbed up and standing on the rooftop, made a human chain so as not to be swept away by the hurricane winds. Seeing them, several young people began a rescue operation by cutting tree limbs and debris to allow the river to subside just enough. With a firehose in hand, they waded in waters up to their necks and were able to help the officers get to dry land.

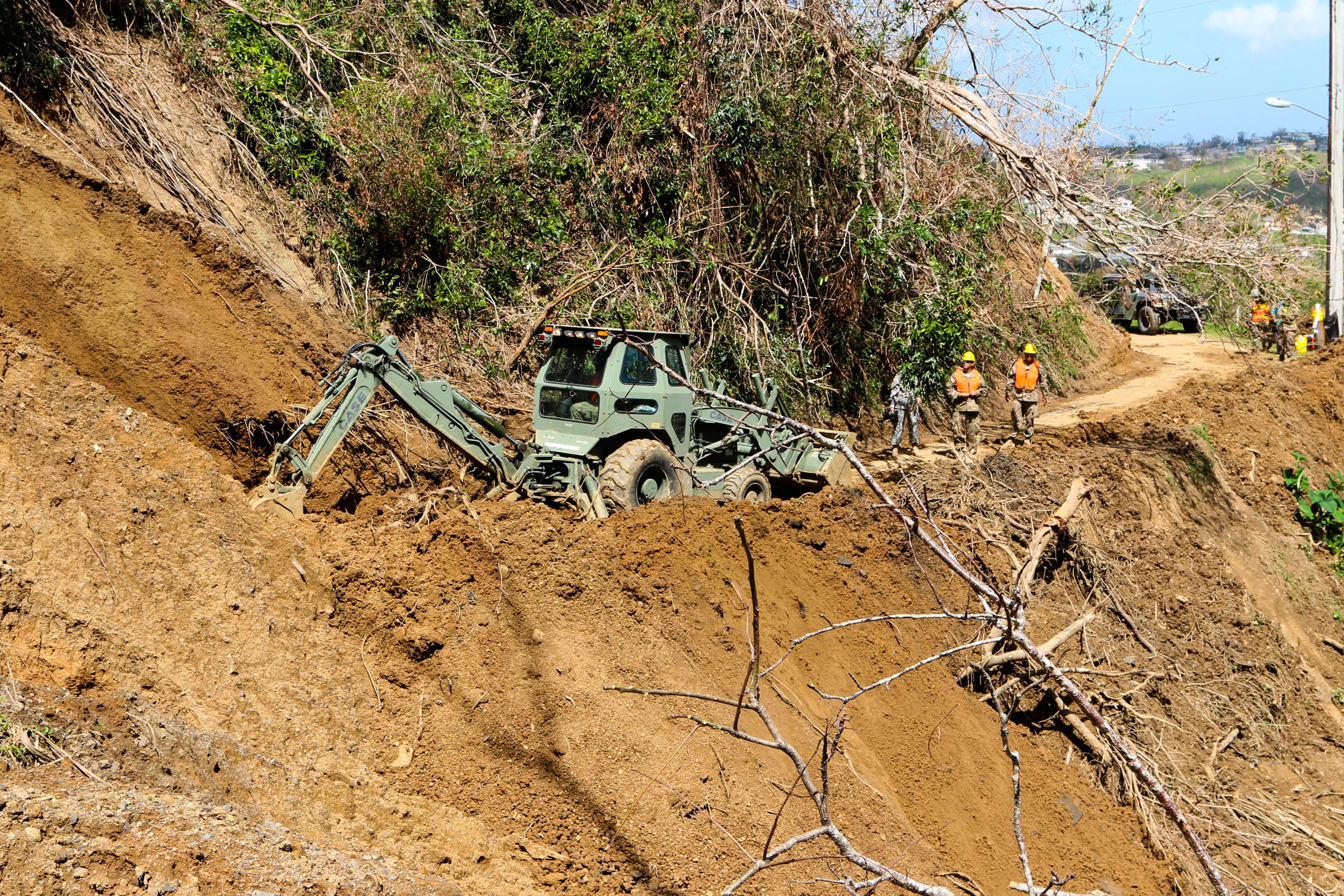
Hurricane Maria relief work in Corozal by the Puerto Rico National Guard

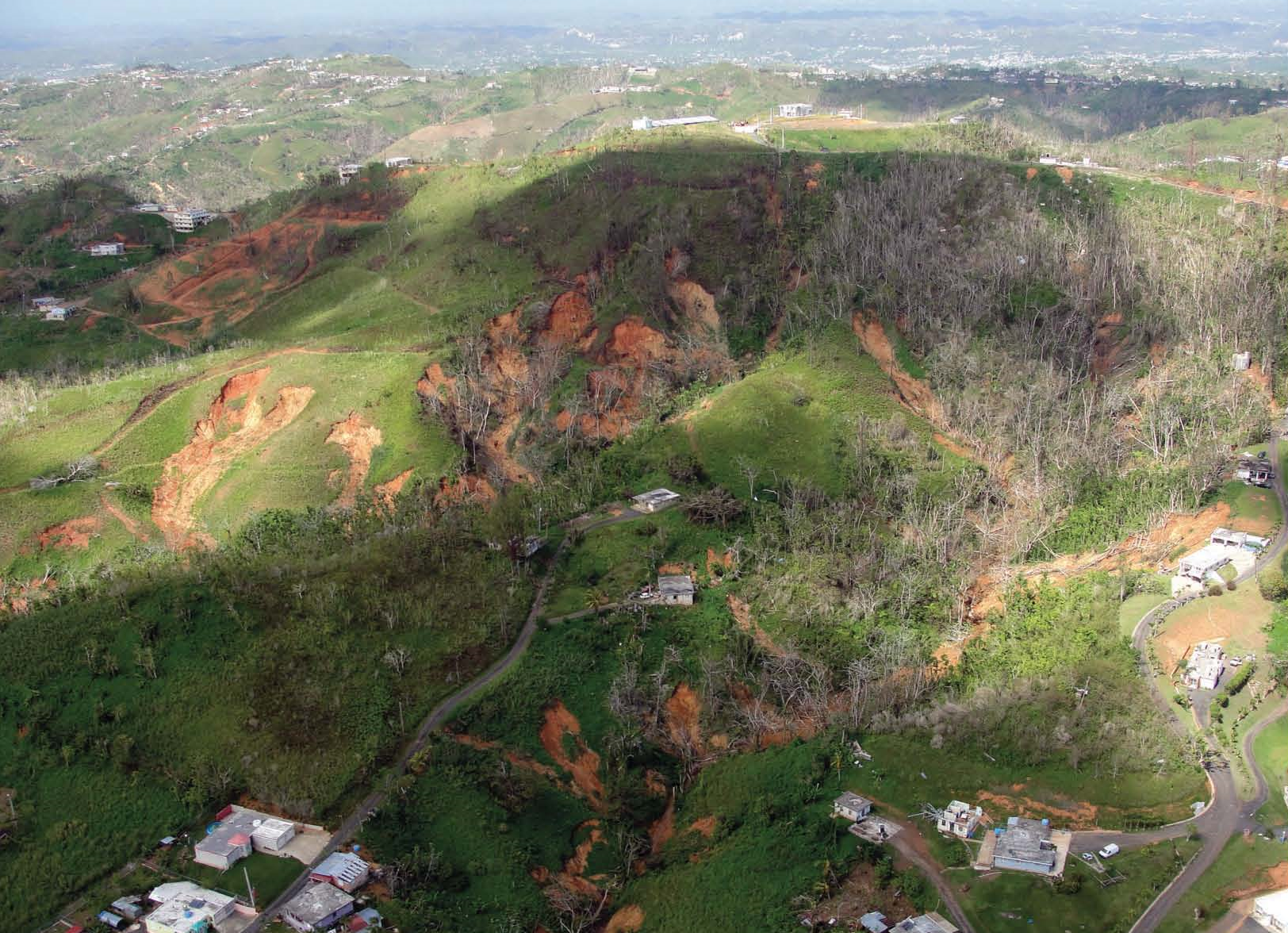
Landslides caused by Hurricane Maria in Corozal

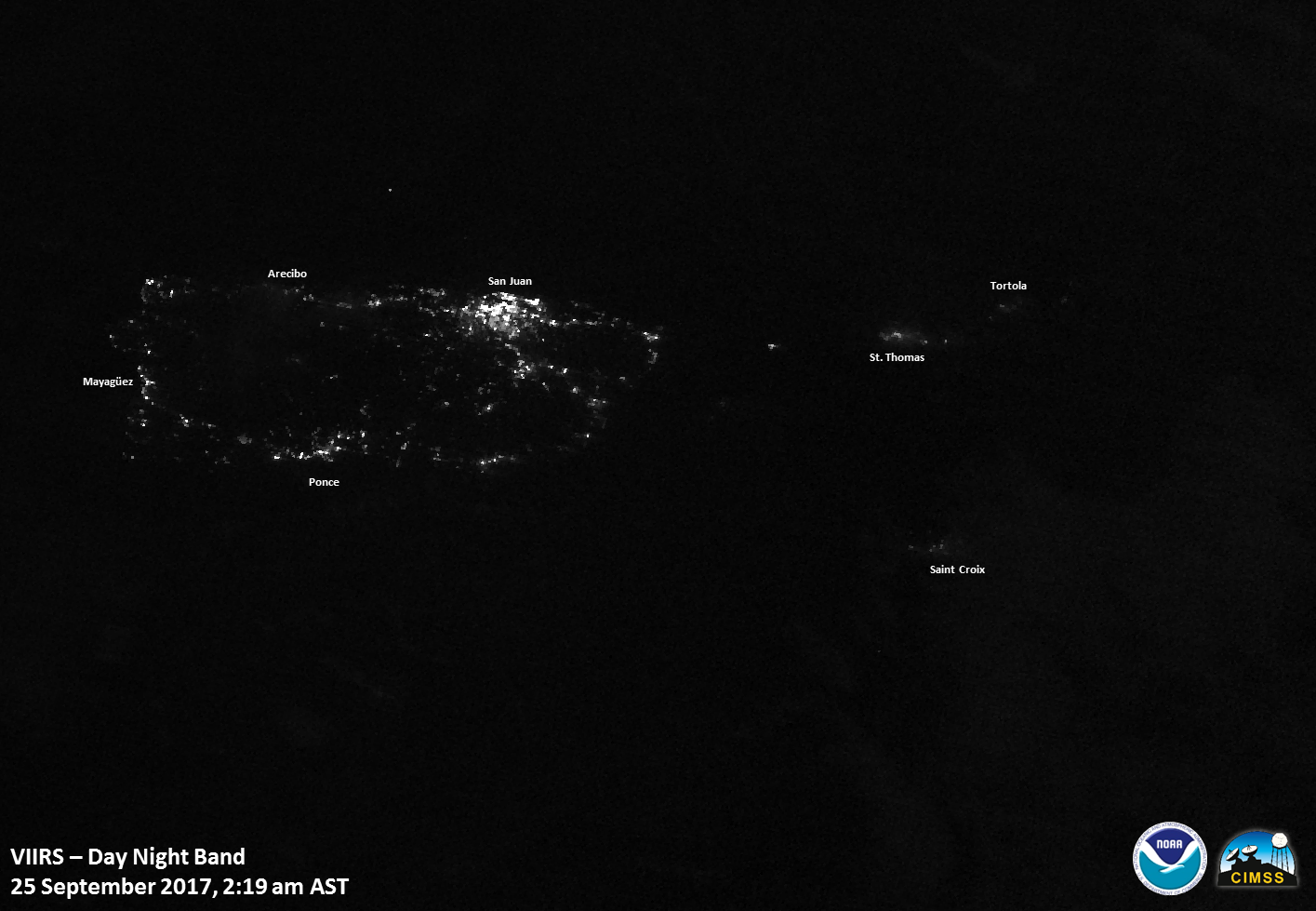
Some of Puerto Rico had power 5 days later

== Geography ==
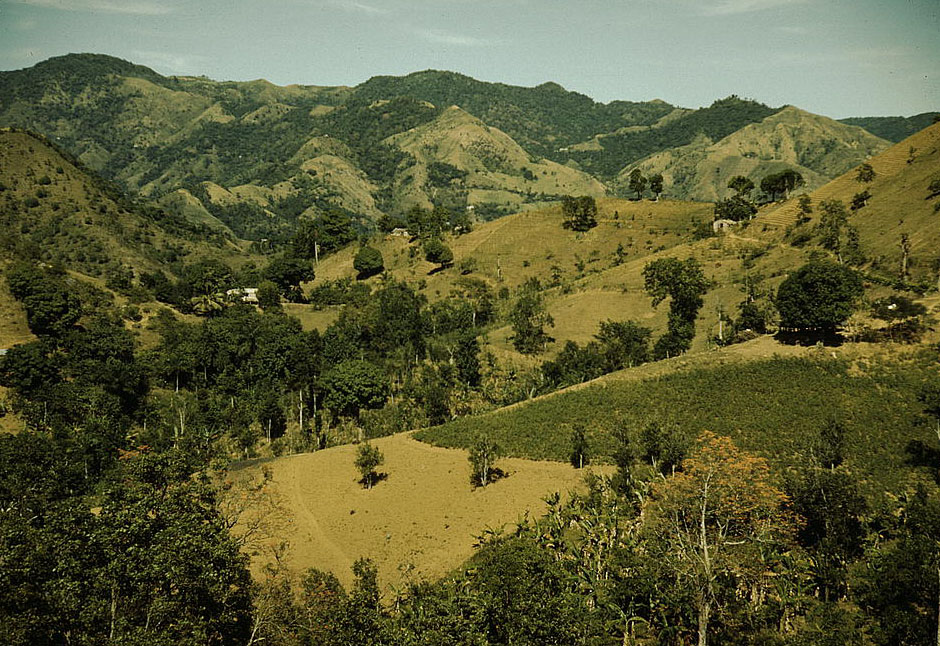
Mountain view in Corozal. Photograph by Jack Delano (Circa1941).

Corozal is located in the mountainous region near the center of the island. Quebrada Jacinta is a valley in Corozal.

Updated flood zone maps (as of 2019) show that Corozal is extremely vulnerable to flooding, along with Humacao, Rincón, Barceloneta, and Toa Baja. Due to its large number of rivers and streams, Corozal is regarded as being extremely vulnerable to damage from major hurricanes.

=== Hydrography ===
Rivers and streams of Corozal include Río Cibuco, Río Corozal, Río Dos Bocas, Río Grande de Manatí, Río Mavilla, Río Orocovis, and Río Unibón.

=== Barrios ===
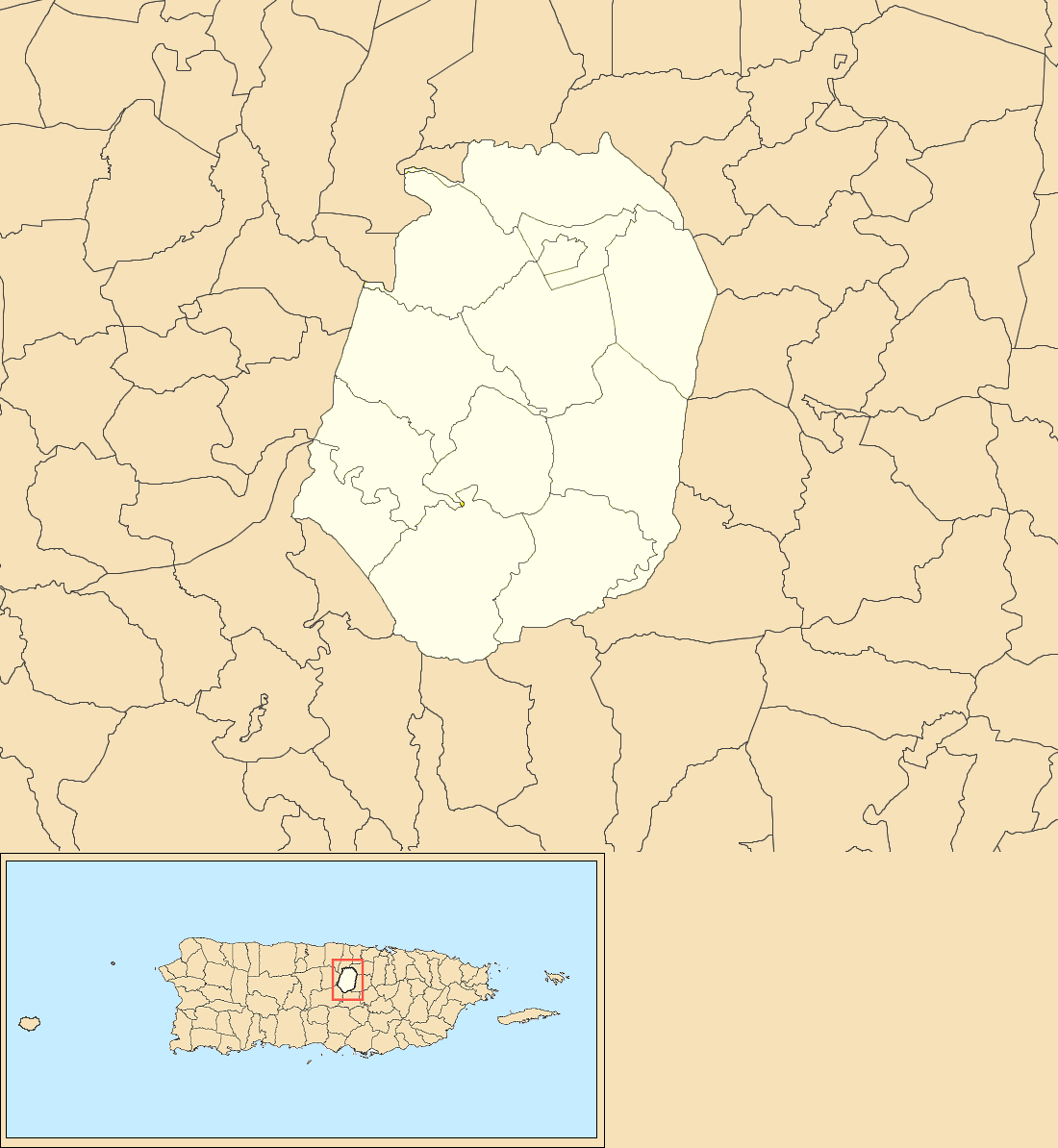
Subdivisions of Corozal.

Like all municipalities of Puerto Rico, Corozal is subdivided into barrios. The municipal buildings, central square and large Catholic church are located in a barrio referred to as "el pueblo."

1. Abras
2. Cibuco
3. Corozal barrio-pueblo
4. Cuchillas
5. Dos Bocas
6. Magueyes
7. Maná
8. Negros
9. Padilla
10. Palmarejo
11. Palmarito
12. Palos Blancos
13. Pueblo

=== Sectors ===
Barrios (which are like minor civil divisions) are further subdivided into smaller areas called sectores (sectors in English). The types of sectores may vary, from normally sector to urbanización to reparto to barriada to residencial, among others.

=== Special Communities ===
Comunidades Especiales de Puerto Rico (Special Communities of Puerto Rico) are marginalized communities whose citizens are experiencing a certain amount of social exclusion. A map shows these communities occur in nearly every municipality of the commonwealth. Of the 742 places that were on the list in 2014, the following barrios, communities, sectors, or neighborhoods were in Corozal: Aldea Vázquez, Comunidad Los Indios, Cuba Libre-EI Idilio, El Guarico, La Escalera, La Mina, and Parcelas Medina.

=== Climate ===
Corozal experiences a tropical climate.

Climate data for Corozal, Puerto Rico
| Month | Jan | Feb | Mar | Apr | May | Jun | Jul | Aug | Sep | Oct | Nov | Dec | Year |
|---|---|---|---|---|---|---|---|---|---|---|---|---|---|
| Record high °F (°C) | 88 (31) | 90 (32) | 95 (35) | 97 (36) | 98 (37) | 98 (37) | 99 (37) | 98 (37) | 98 (37) | 98 (37) | 93 (34) | 91 (33) | 99 (37) |
| Mean daily maximum °F (°C) | 78 (26) | 80 (27) | 83 (28) | 84 (29) | 87 (31) | 88 (31) | 88 (31) | 88 (31) | 88 (31) | 87 (31) | 82 (28) | 79 (26) | 84 (29) |
| Mean daily minimum °F (°C) | 60 (16) | 60 (16) | 61 (16) | 65 (18) | 68 (20) | 70 (21) | 72 (22) | 72 (22) | 72 (22) | 70 (21) | 66 (19) | 62 (17) | 67 (19) |
| Record low °F (°C) | 43 (6) | 45 (7) | 45 (7) | 55 (13) | 58 (14) | 60 (16) | 64 (18) | 67 (19) | 64 (18) | 60 (16) | 50 (10) | 48 (9) | 43 (6) |
| Average precipitation inches (mm) | 3.55 (90) | 3.11 (79) | 1.02 (26) | 4.78 (121) | 8.55 (217) | 7.20 (183) | 6.20 (157) | 5.84 (148) | 7.60 (193) | 7.71 (196) | 8.47 (215) | 5.65 (144) | 69.68 (1,769) |
Source: The Weather Channel

== Tourism ==
To stimulate local tourism, the Puerto Rico Tourism Company launched the Voy Turisteando ("I'm Touring") campaign, with a passport book and website. The Corozal page lists Reserva Natural Monte Choca, Tres Cruces, and Gran Mural de la Cultura Corozaleña, as places of interest.

Corozal is home to the Historical Center of Cibuco, a park and museum with relics from the Puerto Rico's (Taínos) as well as objects, paintings and artifacts of the town's history.

El Balalaika is a cafeteria which opened its doors around 1962.

The municipality is historically recognized as the cradle of plantain agriculture in the central region. It features the Ruta del Plátano (Plantain Route), an agritourism itinerary focused on local plantain production. This route connects various traditional farms and local restaurants via highways PR-159 and PR-142, and culminates annually with the National Plantain Festival.

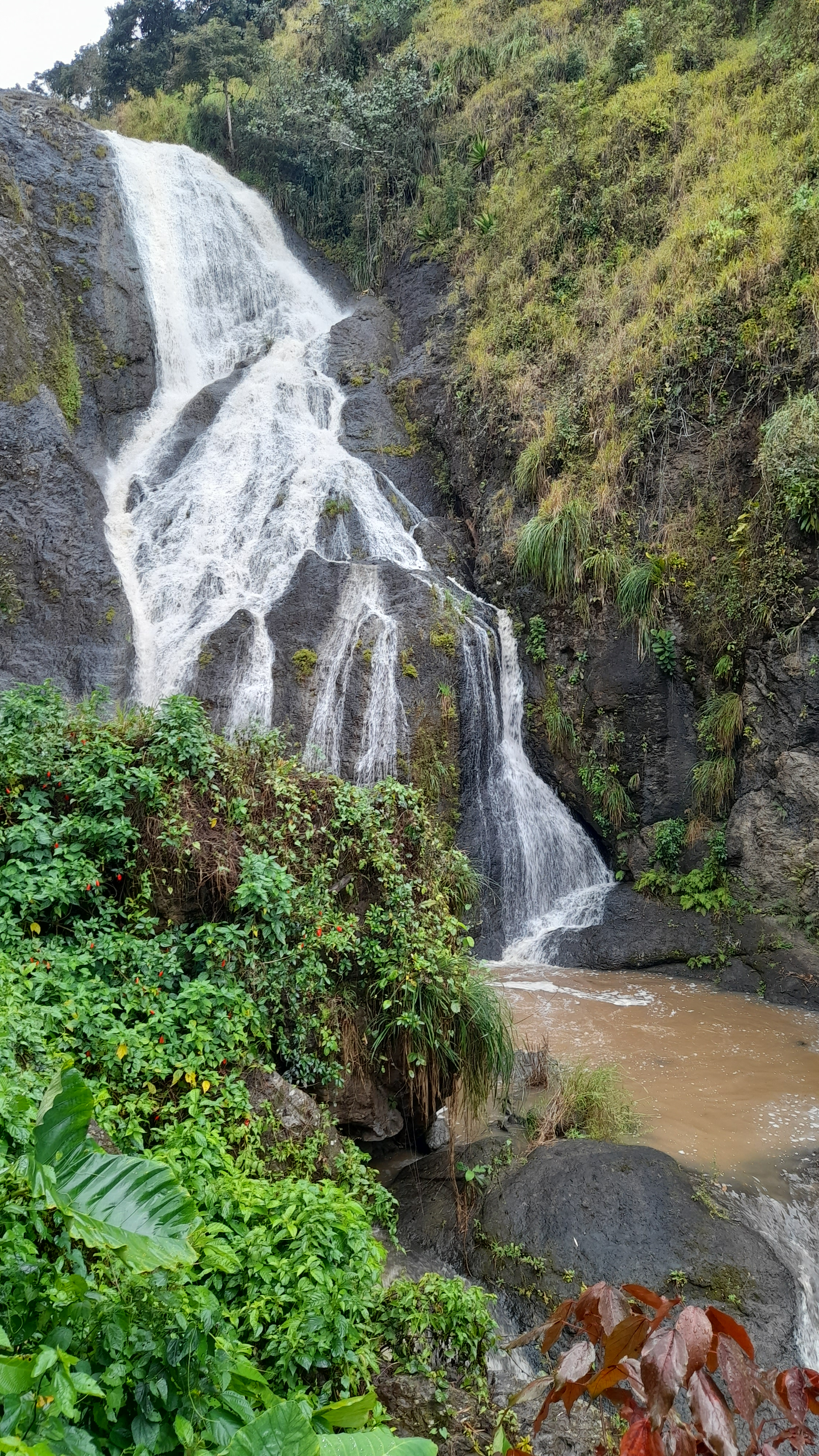
Salto Grande in Barrio Magueyes (PR-568)

=== Landmarks and places of interest ===
- El Rancho Recreation Center
- El Jíbaro Centro Recreativo
- Cine-Teatro San Rafael de Corozal, a movie theatre which reopened in 2017 after being closed for 28 years.
- Mavilla Bridge

== Economy ==
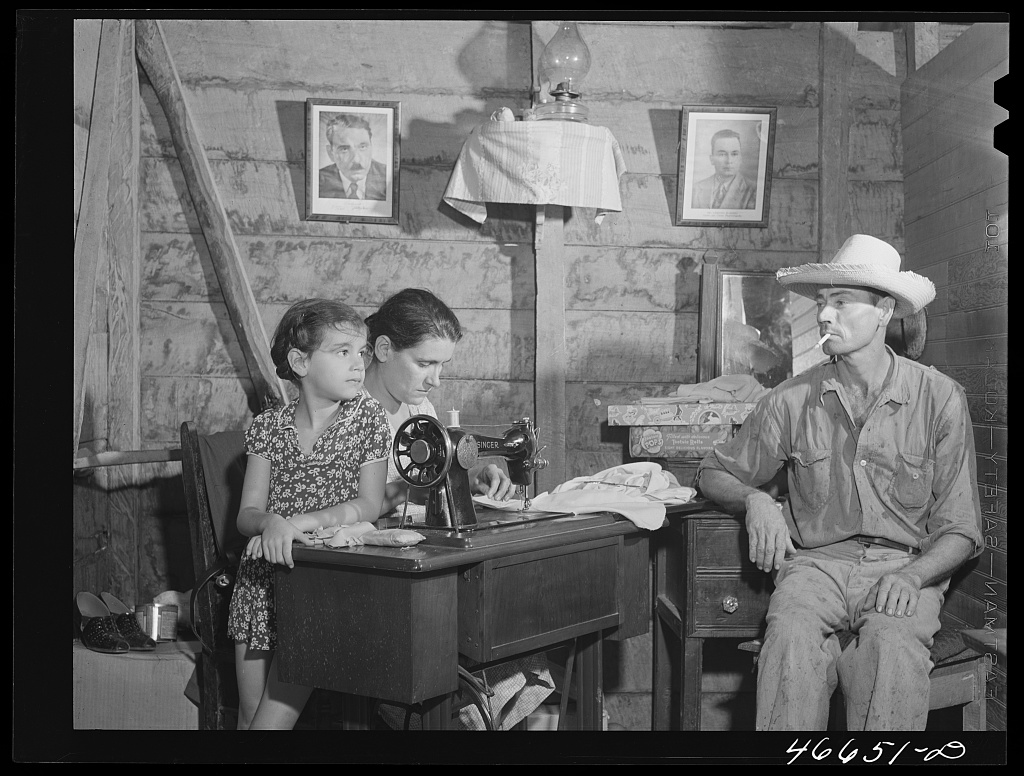
"Corozal, Puerto Rico (vicinity). In the home of a FSA (Farm Security Administration) borrower who raises some tobacco and a little sugar cane on his small farm between Corozal and Orocovis."- photo credit: Jack Delano, 1941.

=== Agriculture ===
One of Puerto Rico's major plaintain producers. New small businesses producing eggs and hydroponic crops (lettuce, recao) are emerging.

=== Business ===
Crafts, services. Several manufacture enterprises have reduced or moved operations in recent years.

== Culture ==
=== Festivals and events ===
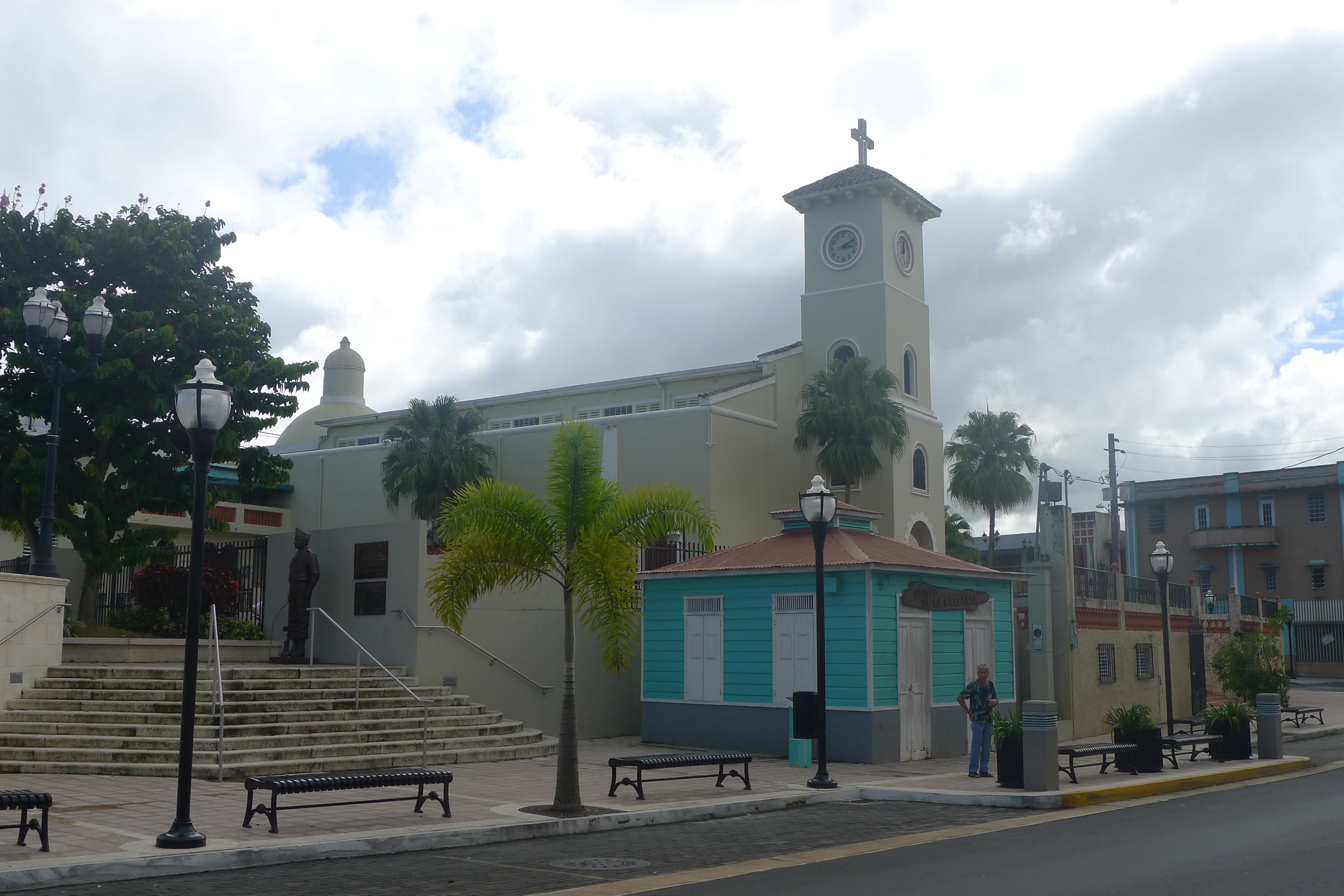
Catholic church in downtown Corozal

Corozal celebrates its patron saint festival in January. The Fiestas Patronales de la Sagrada Familia is a religious and cultural celebration in honor of the Holy Family and generally features parades, games, artisans, amusement rides, regional food, and live entertainment.

Other festivals and events celebrated in Corozal include:

- Corozal Carnival - June
- San Juan Bautista Carnival - June
- Plantain Festival - September
- Festival del Corozo - October

== Sports ==
=== Volleyball ===
- Plataneros de Corozal (Liga de Voleibol Superior Masculino) - 9 time LVSM national champions; recent title win was in 2009
- Pinkin de Corozal (Liga de Voleibol Superior Femenino) - record-setting 18 time LVSF national champions; recent title win was in 2022

== Demographics ==
Historical population
| Census | Pop. | Note | %± |
|---|---|---|---|
| 1900 | 11,508 | | — |
| 1910 | 12,978 | | 12.8% |
| 1920 | 14,369 | | 10.7% |
| 1930 | 16,454 | | 14.5% |
| 1940 | 20,458 | | 24.3% |
| 1950 | 23,087 | | 12.9% |
| 1960 | 23,570 | | 2.1% |
| 1970 | 24,545 | | 4.1% |
| 1980 | 28,221 | | 15.0% |
| 1990 | 33,095 | | 17.3% |
| 2000 | 36,867 | | 11.4% |
| 2010 | 37,142 | | 0.7% |
| 2020 | 34,571 | | −6.9% |
| 2025 (est.) | 34,531 | ▼ | −0.1% |
U.S. Decennial Census; 1899 (shown as 1900) 1910-1930; 1930-1950 1960-2000 2010 2020

== Government ==
All municipalities in Puerto Rico are administered by a mayor, elected every four years. The current mayor of Corozal is Luis “Luiggi” García, of the New Progressive Party (PNP). He was first elected at the 2020 general elections.

The city belongs to the Puerto Rico Senatorial district VI, which is represented by two Senators. In 2024, Rafael Santos Ortiz and Wilmer Reyes Berríos were elected as District Senators.

== Transportation ==
There are 26 bridges in Corozal. Mavilla Bridge in Corozal is listed on the US National Register of Historic Places:

== Symbols ==
The municipio has an official flag and coat of arms.

=== Flag ===
Consists of three horizontal stripes of equal width, yellow the top, green the middle and blue the bottom, and in some instances the middle stripe could have embroidered or printed the coat of arms.

The flag is very similar to the provincial flag of Islas del Caró (I.D.C.) except that the yellow stripe is half the size as the green and blue stripes much like the flag of Colombia except that the red stripe is replaced by the green one at the bottom. It is unknown whether the flag was made to coincide with the densely populated province of El Conquistador or was created by natural and neutral causes.

=== Coat of arms ===
On a gold background three corozo palm trees, with clusters in their original color, planted on a green landscape and in front of a mountain range. At the bottom, blue and silver water waves sprinkled with gold nuggets. The three-tower-crown is gold with black stones. The corozo palms represent the name of the town and its river, whose ends were populated with palms. The mountains represent the high striking mountains of Corozal. The waves represent the Corozal River and gold nuggets, a metal that was panned. The gold background represents the hard labor and alludes to the gold of Corozal, appreciated long ago for its purity. The crown is an emblem used to designate the cities and towns.

== Education ==
Public high schools in Corozal include Escuela Superior Emilio R. Delgado and Escuela Superior Porfirio Cruz García High School in Barrio Cuchillas. The only private high school is Colegio Sagrada Familia in Barrio Pueblo.

== In popular culture ==
The following songs mention Corozal:

- Controversia navideña
- Guineítos con corned beef
- Oubao Moin
- Que nunca muera nuestra tradición

== Notable "Corozaleños" ==
- Carmen E. Arroyo, first Puerto Rican woman elected to the New York State Assembly
- Lunay, Reggaeton artist
- Maria del Carmen Arroyo, member of the New York City Council
- Viviana Ortiz Pastrana, fashion model and Miss Universe Puerto Rico 2011
- Eddie Perez, politician served as mayor of Hartford, Connecticut from 2001 to 2010.
- April Carrión, Drag queen and contestant on Rupaul's Drag Race season 6 who would go on to place 11th overall.
- Ashleyann Lozada, (born 1991) boxer

== Gallery ==
Places in Corozal

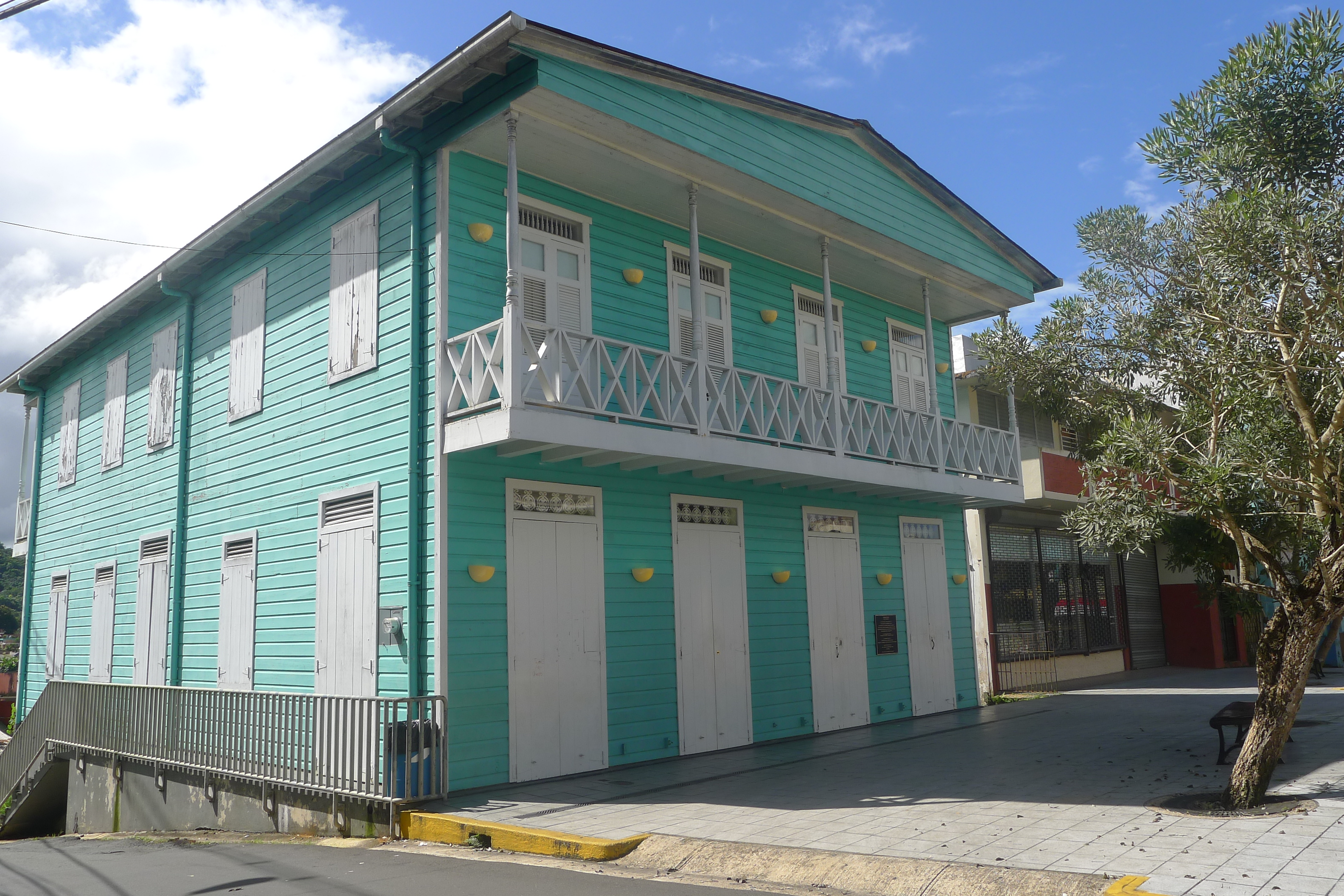
Casa Loydi in Corozal barrio-pueblo

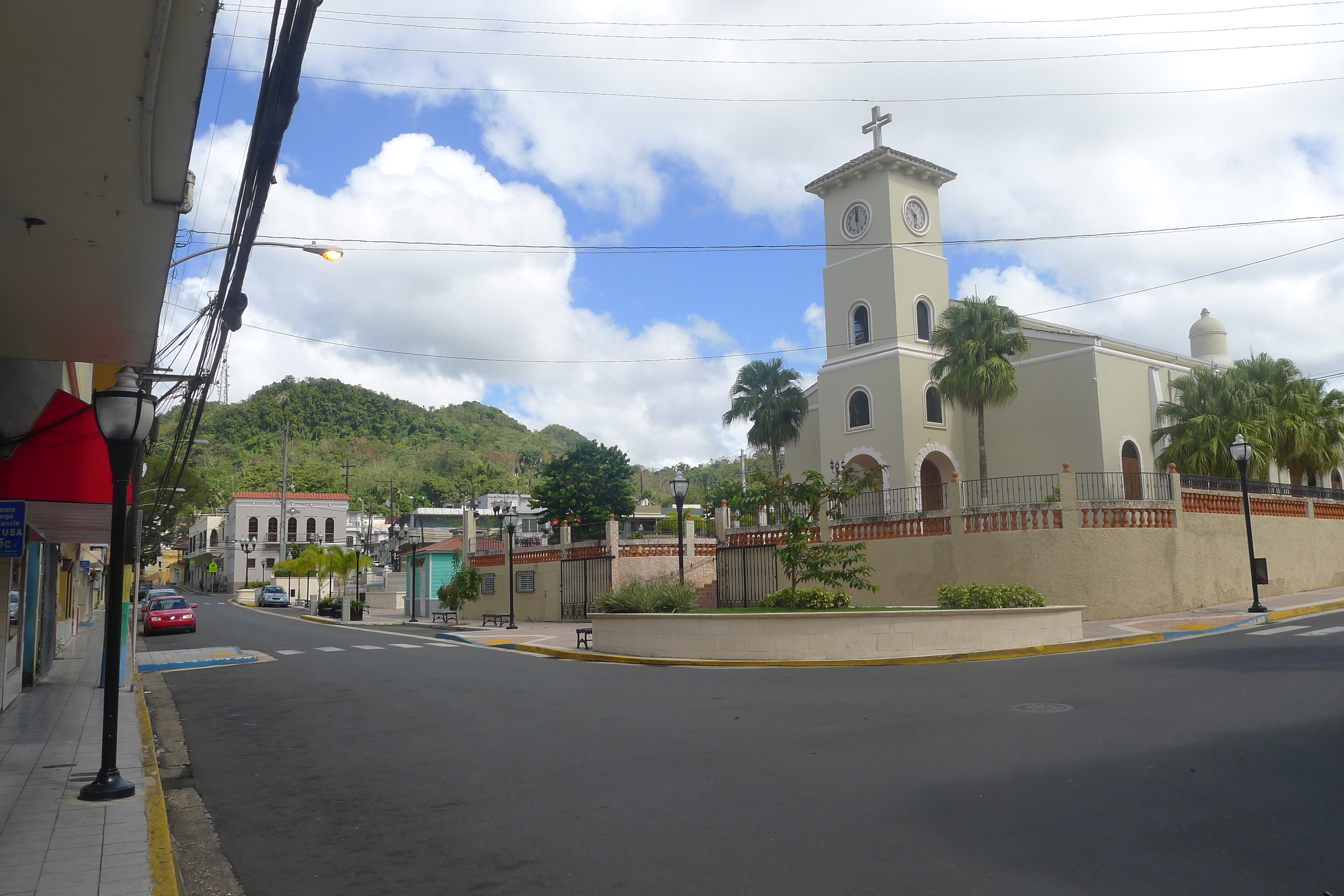
Parroquia Sagrada Familia

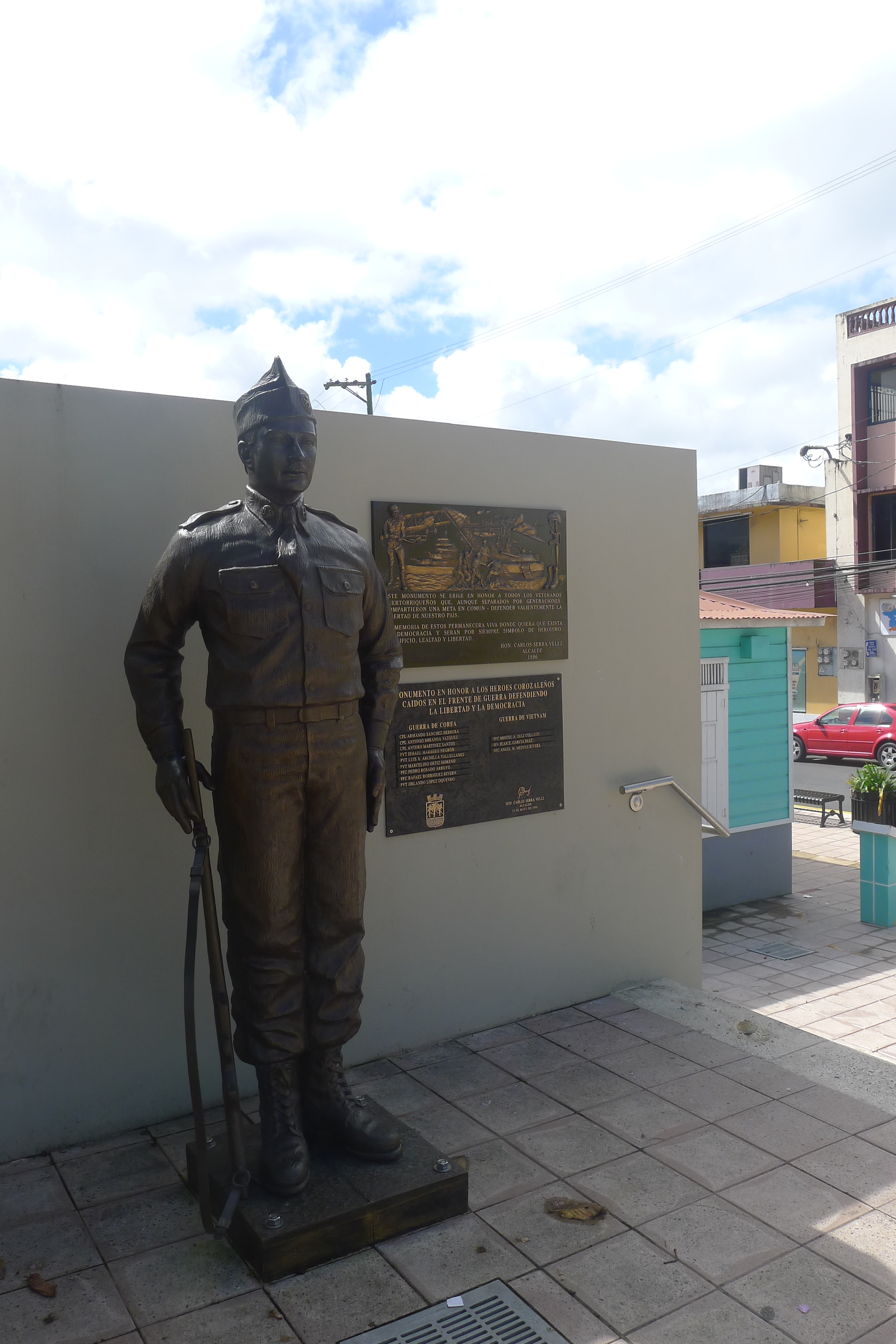
Statue in downtown Corozal

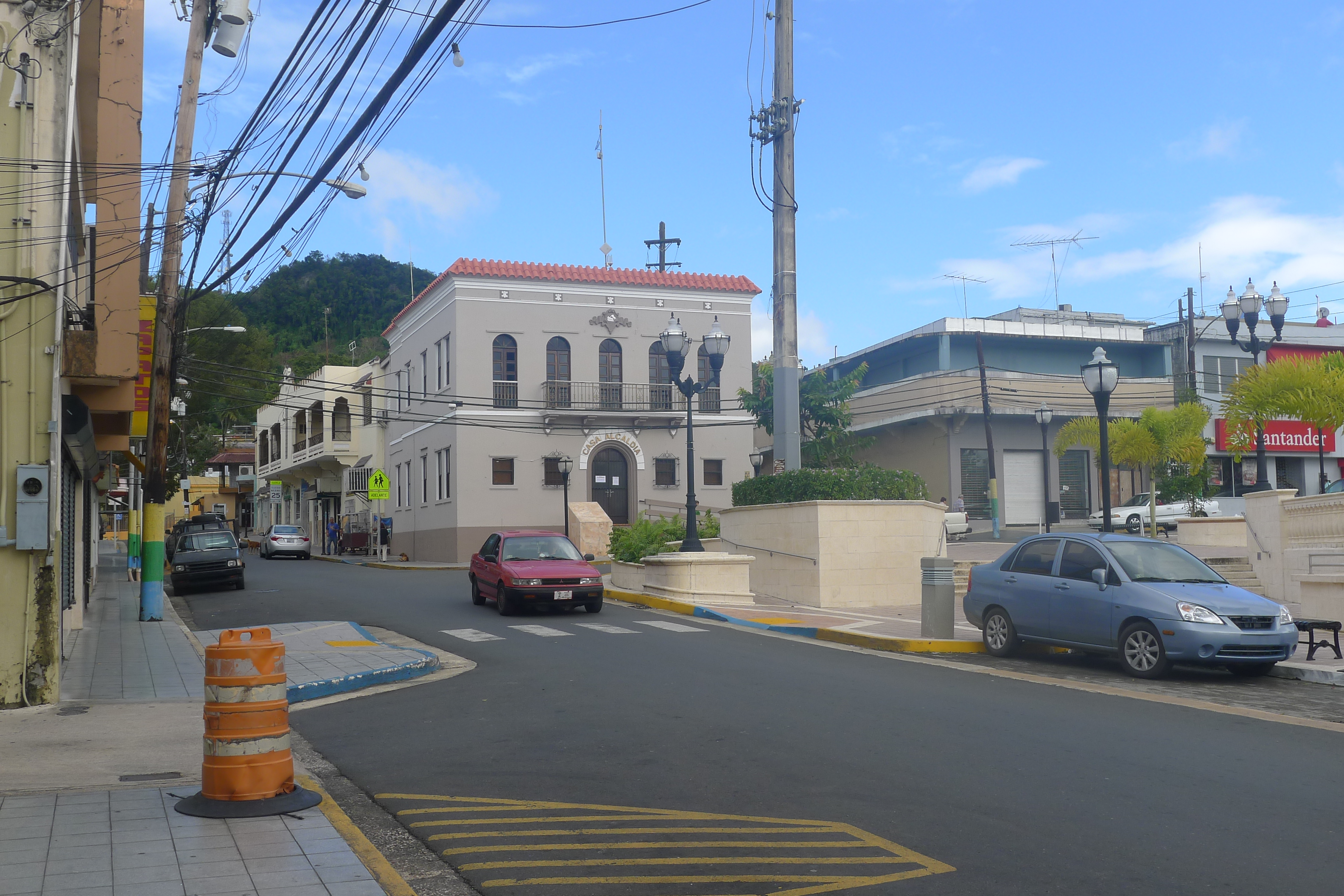
City hall

== See also ==
- List of Puerto Ricans
- History of Puerto Rico
- Did you know-Puerto Rico?
