= Mavilla River =

River of Puerto Rico

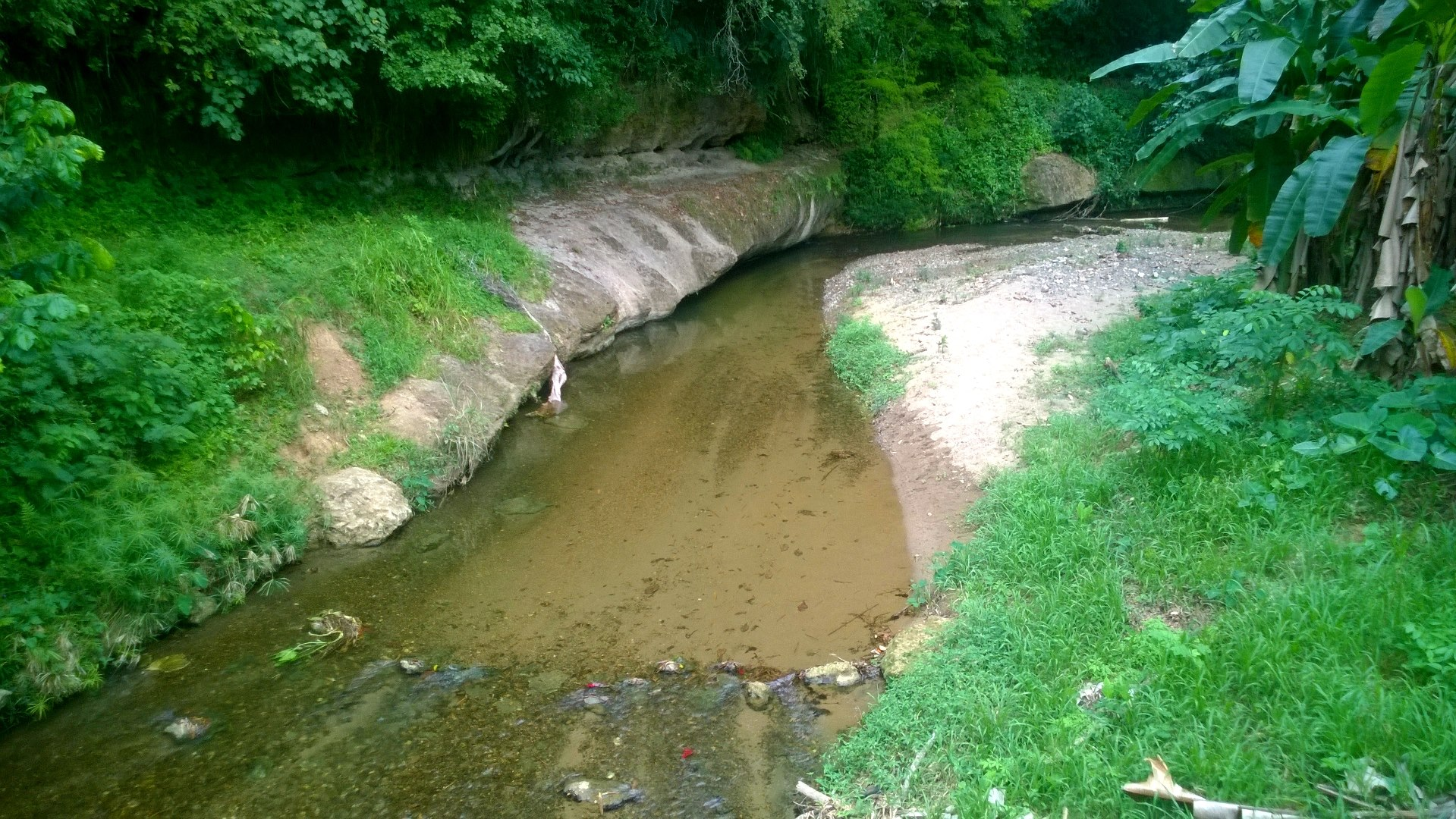
- Mavilla River between Corozal and Vega Alta
- Native name: Río Mavilla (Spanish)

Location
- Commonwealth: Puerto Rico
- Municipality: Naranjito

Physical characteristics
- Source
  - coordinates: 18.3657834°N 66.3518362°W

Basin features
- Bridges: Mavilla Bridge

The Mavilla River (Spanish: Río Mavilla) is a river of Naranjito, Vega Alta, and Corozal in Puerto Rico.

== See also ==
- Mavilla Bridge: NRHP listing between Bayamón and Corozal, Puerto Rico
- List of rivers of Puerto Rico
