= Cibuco, Corozal, Puerto Rico =

Barrio of Puerto Rico

Cibuco
- Barrio
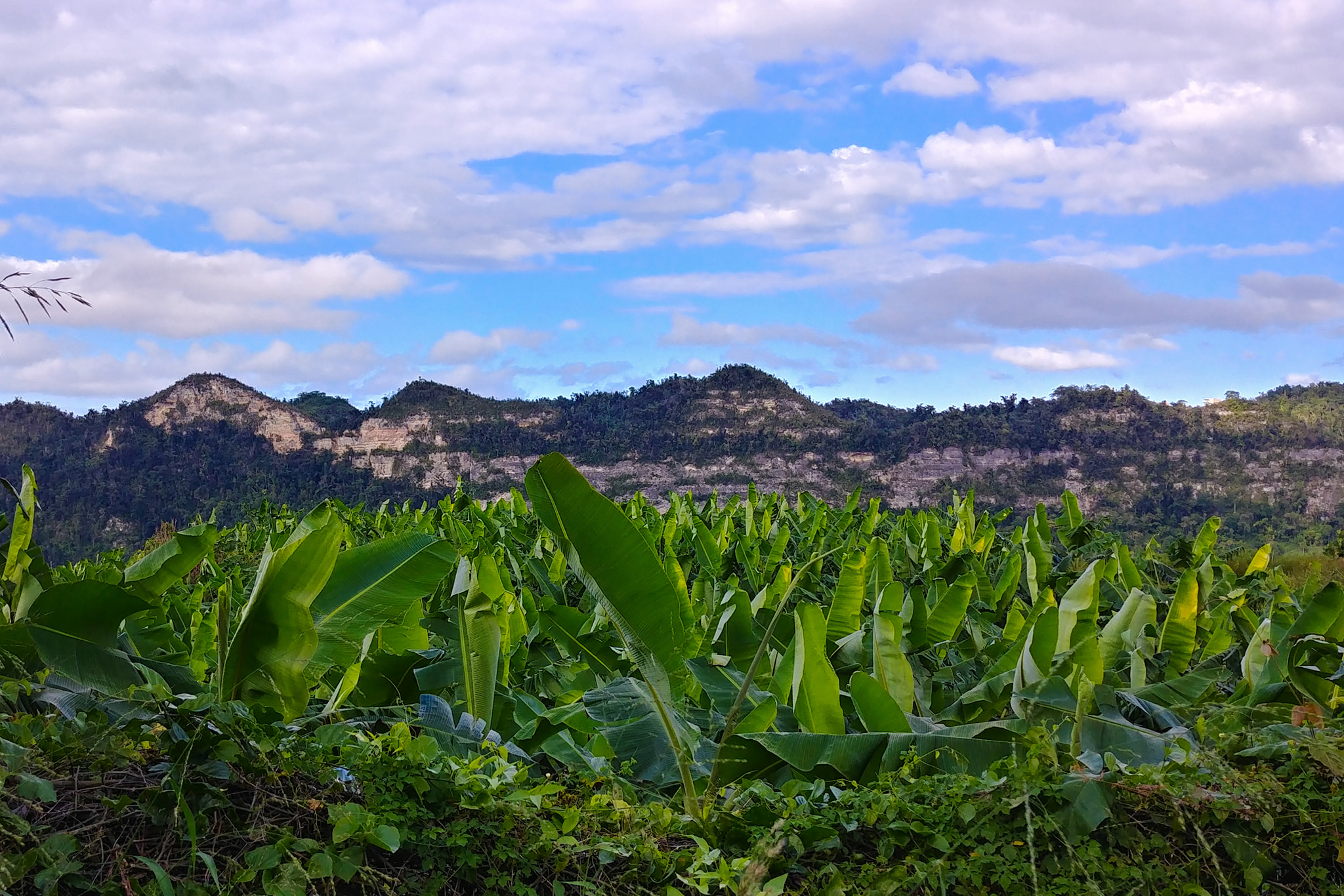
- Plantain cultivation in Cibuco barrio

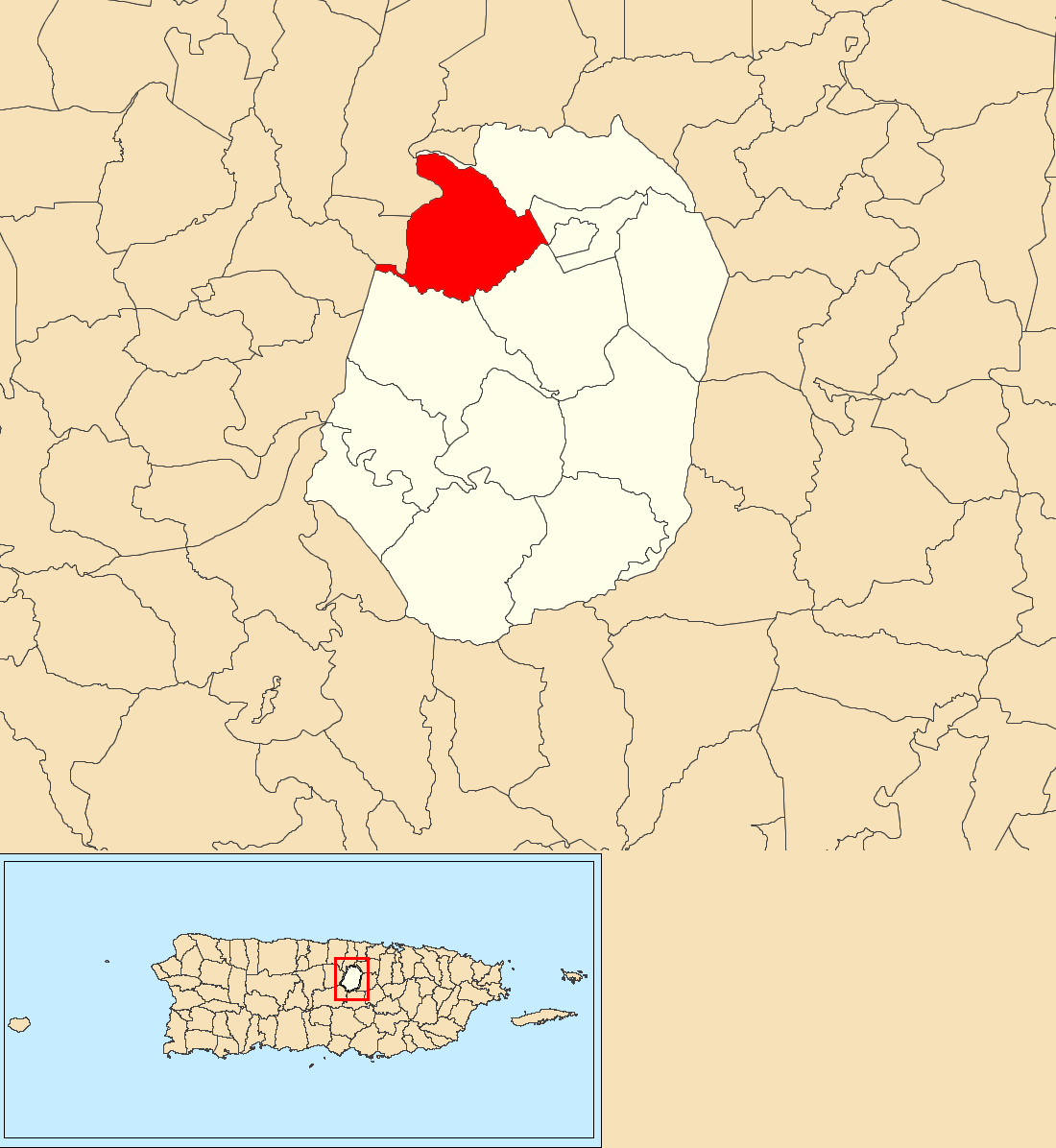
- Location of Cibuco within the municipality of Corozal shown in red

- Location of Puerto Rico
- Coordinates: 18°20′26″N 66°20′37″W
- Commonwealth: Puerto Rico
- Municipality: Corozal

Area
  - Total: 3.6 sq mi (9.3 km^{2})
  - Land: 3.6 sq mi (9.3 km^{2})
  - Water: 0 sq mi (0 km^{2})
- Elevation: 312 ft (95 m)

Population (2010)
  - Total: 5,387
  - Density: 1,504.7/sq mi (581.0/km^{2})
- Source: 2010 Census
- Time zone: UTC−4 (AST)

Cibuco is a rural barrio with an urban zone in the municipality of Corozal, Puerto Rico. Its population in 2010 was 5,387.

== History ==
Cibuco was in Spain's gazetteers until Puerto Rico was ceded by Spain in the aftermath of the Spanish–American War under the terms of the Treaty of Paris of 1898 and became an unincorporated territory of the United States. In 1899, the United States Department of War conducted a census of Puerto Rico finding that the population of Cibuco barrio was 1,098.

== Features and demographics ==
Cibuco has 3.6 square miles (9.3 km^{2}) of land area and no water area. In 2010, its population was 5,387 with a population density of 1,504.7 inhabitants per square mile (581.0/km^{2}).

Historical population
Census	Pop.	Note	%±
1900	1,096		—
1910	1,126		2.7%
1920	1,250		11.0%
1930	1,708		36.6%
1940	2,030		18.9%
1950	2,023		−0.3%
1960	1,958		−3.2%
1970	2,224		13.6%
1980	3,451		55.2%
1990	4,264		23.6%
2000	5,054		18.5%
2010	5,387		6.6%
U.S. Decennial Census; 1899 (shown as 1900) 1910-1930; 1930-1950 1980-2000 2010

== Sectors ==
Barrios (which are now like minor civil divisions) in turn are further subdivided into smaller local populated place areas/units called sectores (sectors in English). The types of sectores may vary, from normally sector to urbanización to reparto to barriada to residencial, among others.

The following sectors are in Cibuco barrio:

=== Cibuco 1 ===
Sector Academia, Sector Aníbal Cabranes, Sector Baja del Palo, Sector Boina, Sector Geño Trinidad, Sector La Escuela, Sector Los Crespo, Sector Los Puertos, Sector Los Torres, Sector Los Trinidad, Sector Maguayo, Sector Mingo Negrón, Sector Nela Nevárez, Sector Tomás Colón, Urbanización Estancias de Cibuco, Urbanización Los Próceres, and Urbanización Villas de Cibuco.

=== Cibuco 2 ===
Extensión Sylvia, Sector Acueducto, Sector Empalme, Sector Guevara, Sector Julio Ortega, Sector Korea, Sector La Mina, Sector Layo Rosado, Sector Los Mangoes, Sector Los Pacheco, Sector Millo Maldonado, Sector Monte de las Brujas, Sector Pepe Pizza, Sector Rolo Barrera, Urbanización Alturas de Cibuco, Urbanización Cibuco, Urbanización Colinas de Corozal, and Urbanización Sylvia.

=== Cibuco 3 ===
Sector El Vironay, Sector Juan Vázquez, Sector Lin Pérez, Urbanización Valle de Aramaná, and Urbanización Villas de Monte Verde.

== Gallery ==
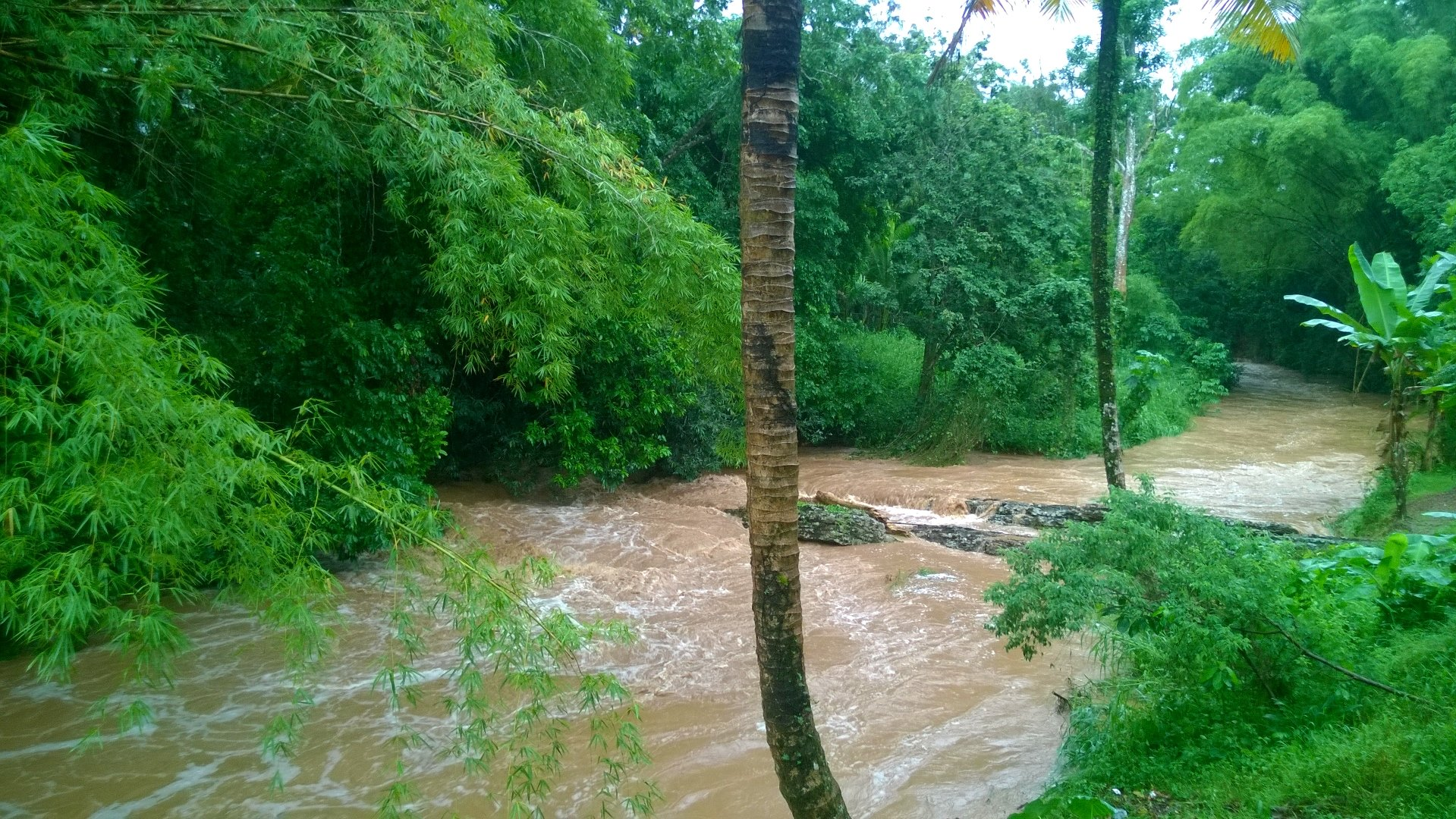
Cibuco River during a rainy day in Cibuco barrio

== See also ==
- List of communities in Puerto Rico
- List of barrios and sectors of Corozal, Puerto Rico
