= Puerto Rico Highway 160 =

Highway in Puerto Rico

Highway 160
- Ruta 160

Route information
- Maintained by Puerto Rico DTPW
- Length: 15.3 km (9.5 mi)
- Existed: 1953–present

Major junctions
- South end: PR-159 in Unibón
- PR-645 in Almirante Sur; PR-675 in Almirante Norte; PR-22 in Almirante Norte; PR-676 in Río Abajo
- North end: PR-2 in Río Abajo

Location
- Country: United States
- Territory: Puerto Rico
- Municipalities: Morovis, Vega Alta, Vega Baja

Highway system
- Roads in Puerto Rico; List
← PR-159	→ PR-161

Puerto Rico Highway 160 (PR-160) is a rural road that travels from Vega Baja, Puerto Rico to Morovis. This highway begins at PR-2 east of downtown Vega Baja and ends at PR-159 in Unibón.

Puerto Rico Highway 160

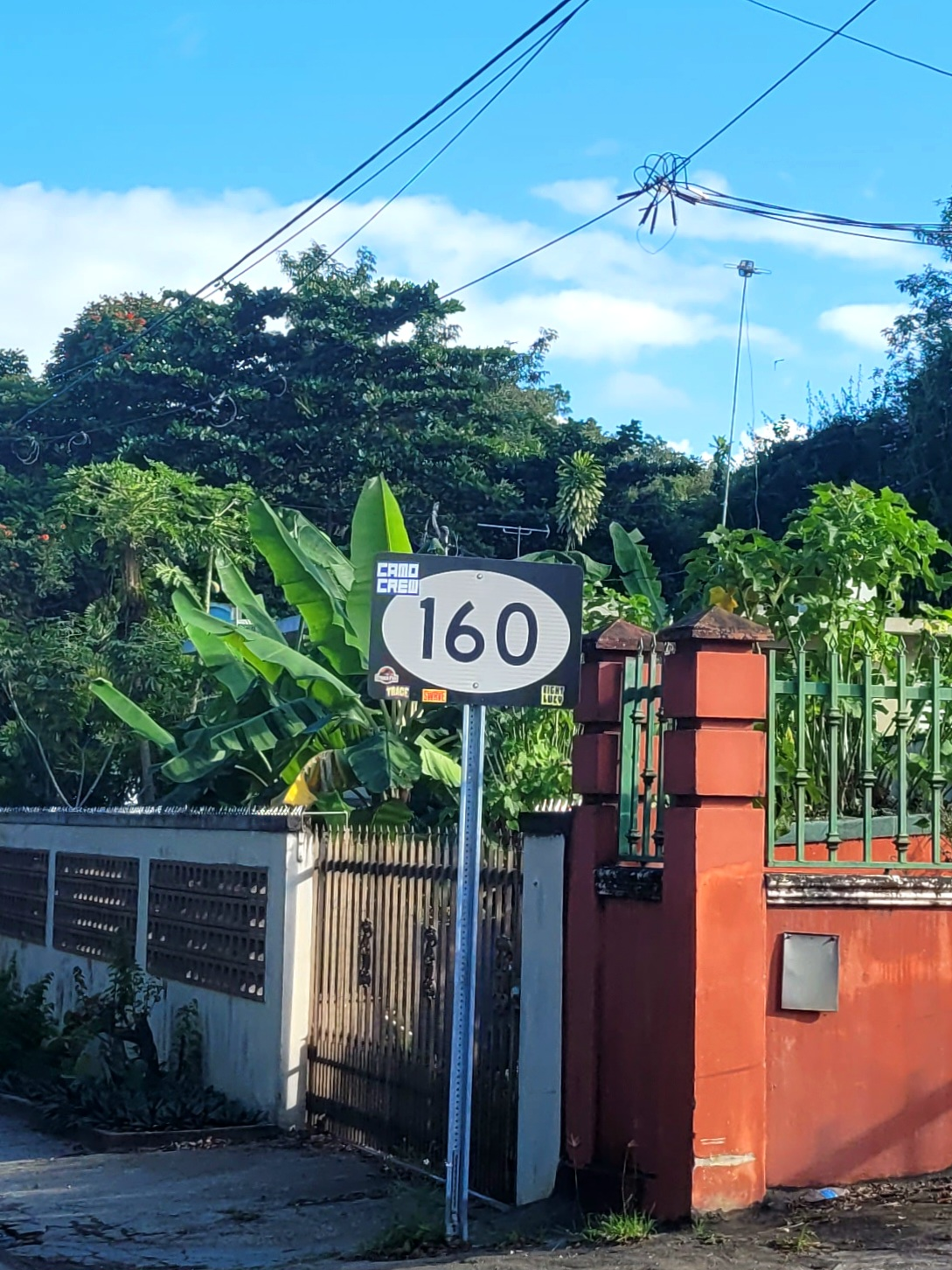
Southbound sign in Río Abajo, Vega Baja

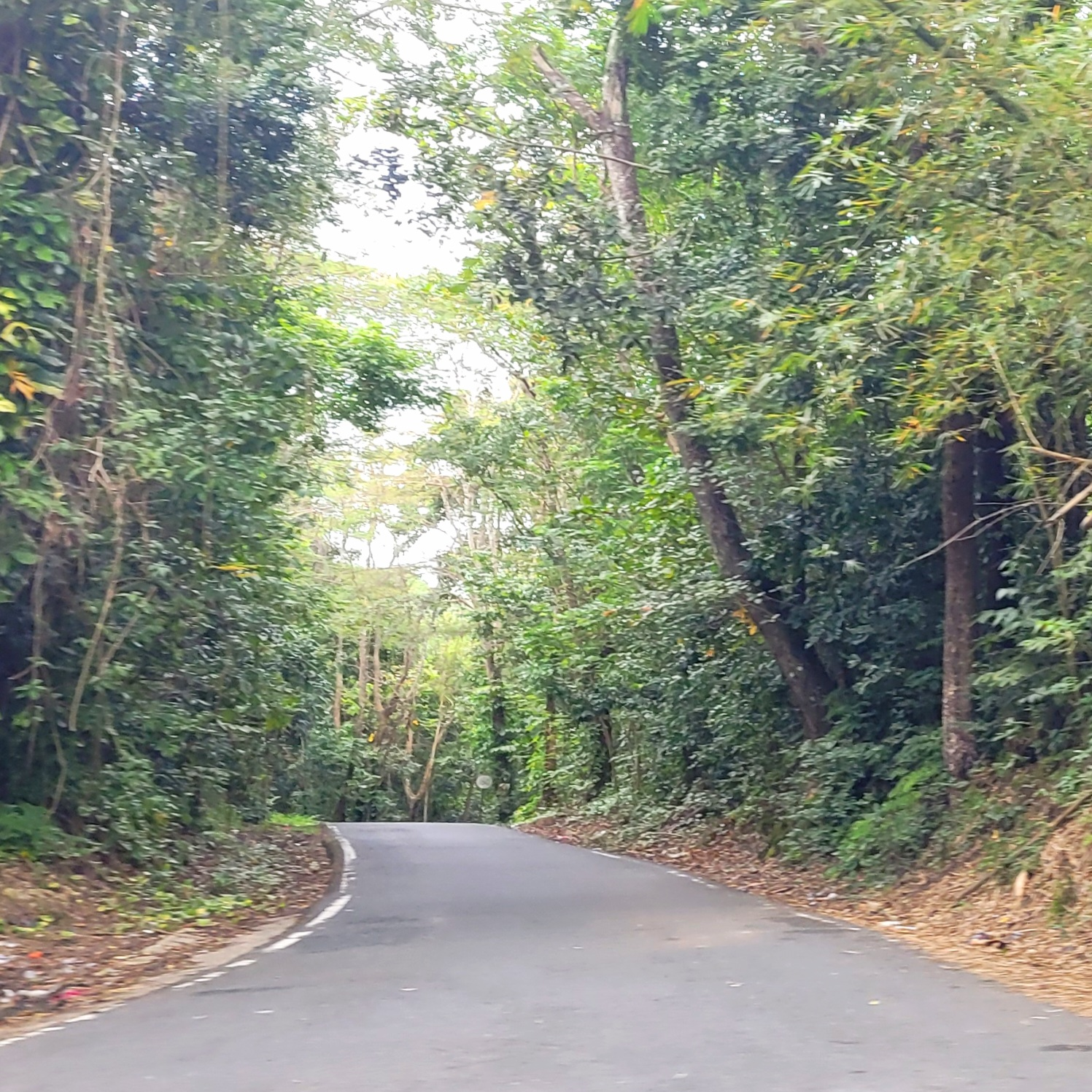
Northbound beginning in Unibón, Morovis, leaving PR-159 junction

== Major intersections ==
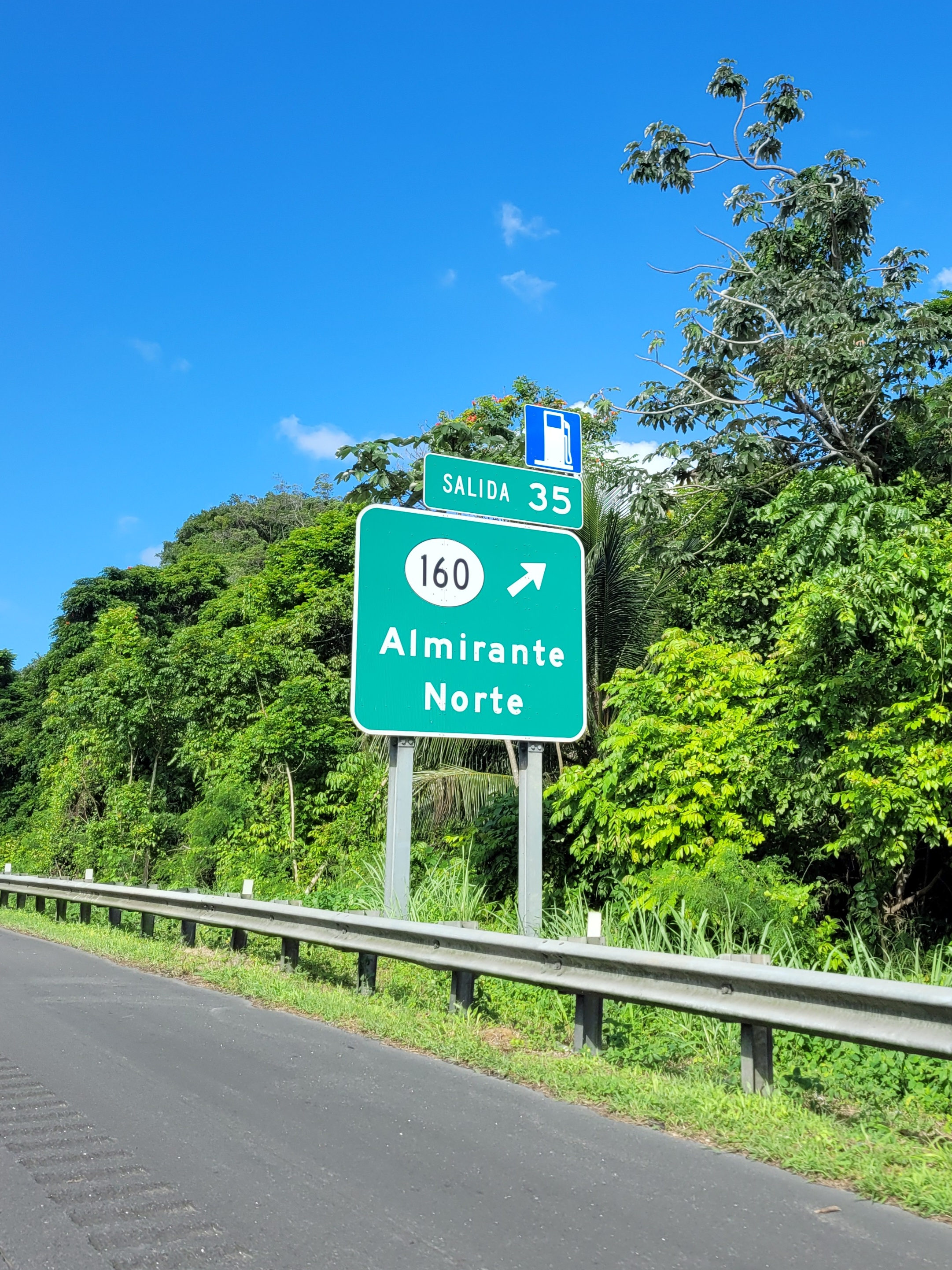
PR-22 west at exit 35 to PR-160 in Almirante Norte, Vega Baja

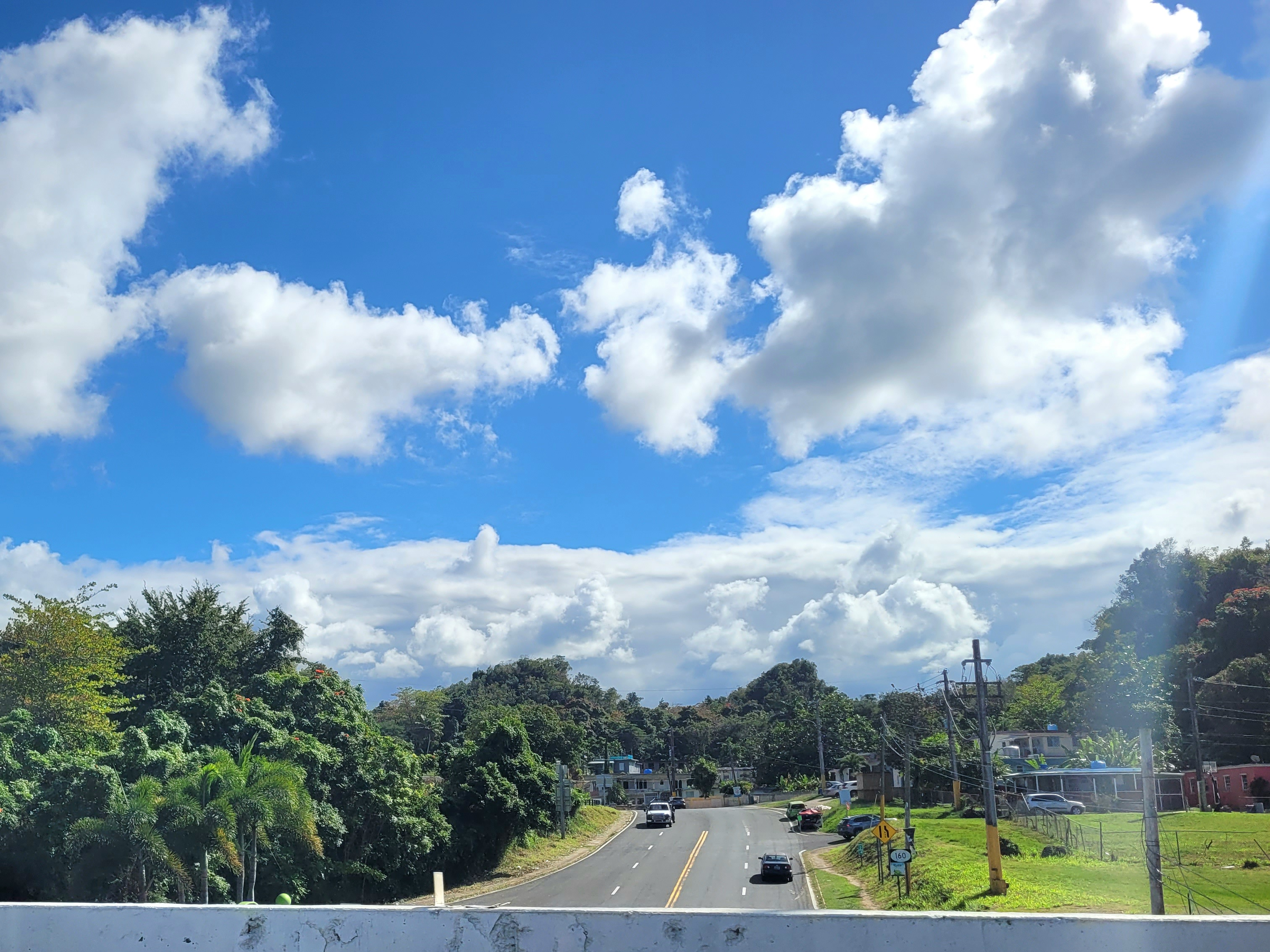
PR-160 south at PR-22 interchange in Almirante Norte, Vega Baja

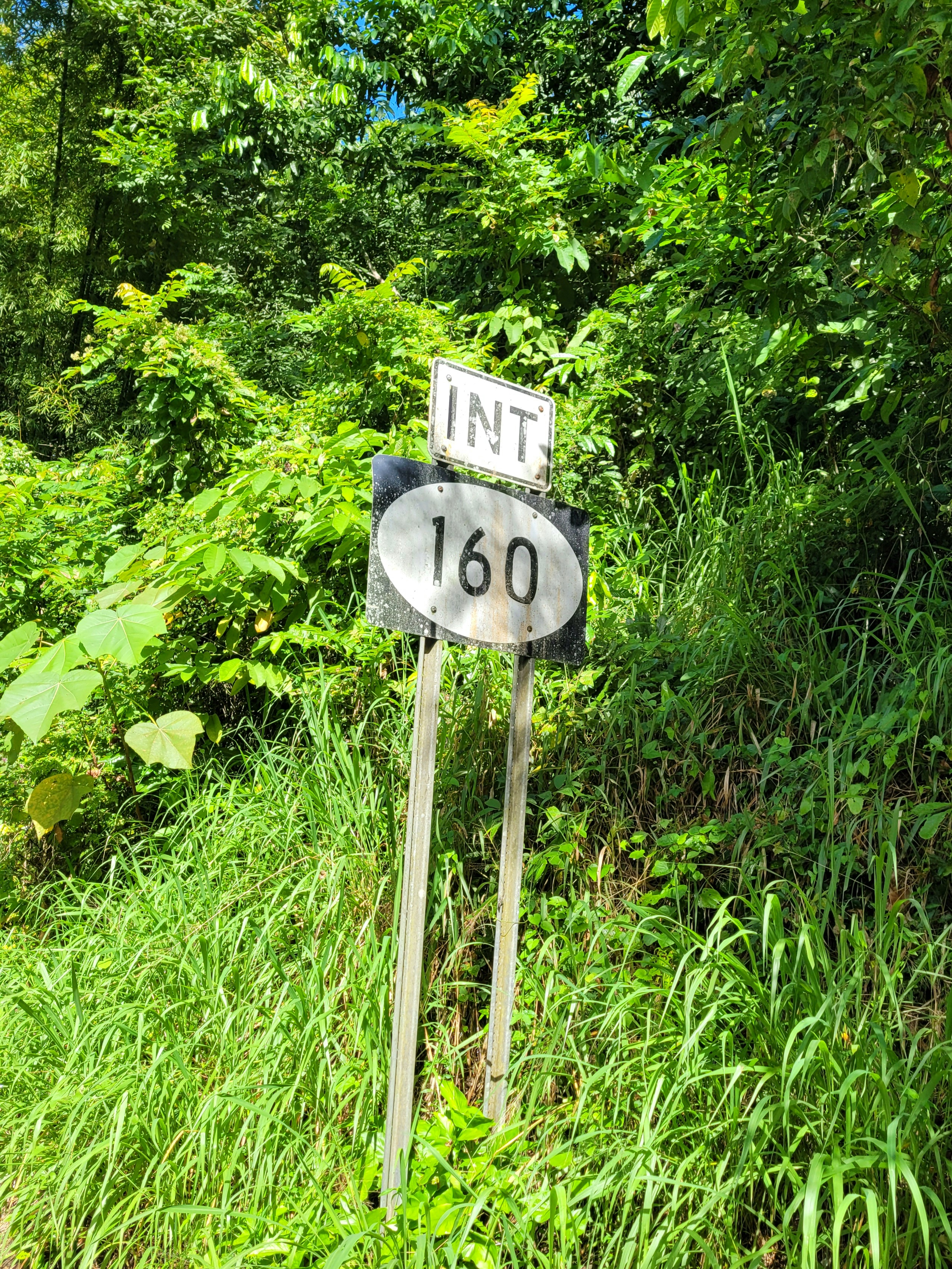
PR-159 west approaching the southern terminus of PR-160 in Unibón, Morovis

Municipality	Location	km	mi	Destinations	Notes
Morovis	Unibón	15.3	9.5	PR-159 – Morovis, Corozal	Southern terminus of PR-160
Vega Alta	No major junctions				
Vega Baja	Almirante Sur	8.2	5.1	PR-645 to PR-646 – Quebrada Arenas, Río Arriba	
Vega Baja	Almirante Norte	4.3	2.7	PR-675 – Bajura	
Vega Baja	Almirante Norte	2.4– 2.3	1.5– 1.4	PR-22 (Autopista José de Diego) – San Juan, Arecibo	PR-22 exit 35; diamond interchange
Vega Baja	Río Abajo	0.3– 0.2	0.19– 0.12	PR-676 – Vega Alta	
Vega Baja	Río Abajo	0.0	0.0	PR-2 – Vega Baja, Vega Alta	Northern terminus of PR-160
1.000 mi = 1.609 km; 1.000 km = 0.621 mi

== See also ==
- 1953 Puerto Rico highway renumbering
