= Puerto Rico Highway 161 =

Highway in Puerto Rico

Highway 161
- Ruta 161
- Desvío Norte Luis Muñoz Marín

Route information
- Maintained by Puerto Rico DTPW
- Length: 2.4 km (1.5 mi)

Major junctions
- West end: PR-1 in Boca Velázquez
- PR-153 in Boca Velázquez–Santa Isabel barrio-pueblo
- East end: PR-1 in Felicia 1

Location
- Country: United States
- Territory: Puerto Rico
- Municipalities: Santa Isabel

Highway system
- Roads in Puerto Rico; List
← PR-160	→ PR-162

Puerto Rico Highway 161 (PR-161) is an east–west bypass located north of downtown Santa Isabel, Puerto Rico. This road serves as an alternate route to the PR-1 and is known as Desvío Norte Luis Muñoz Marín.

== Major intersections ==
The entire route is located in Santa Isabel.

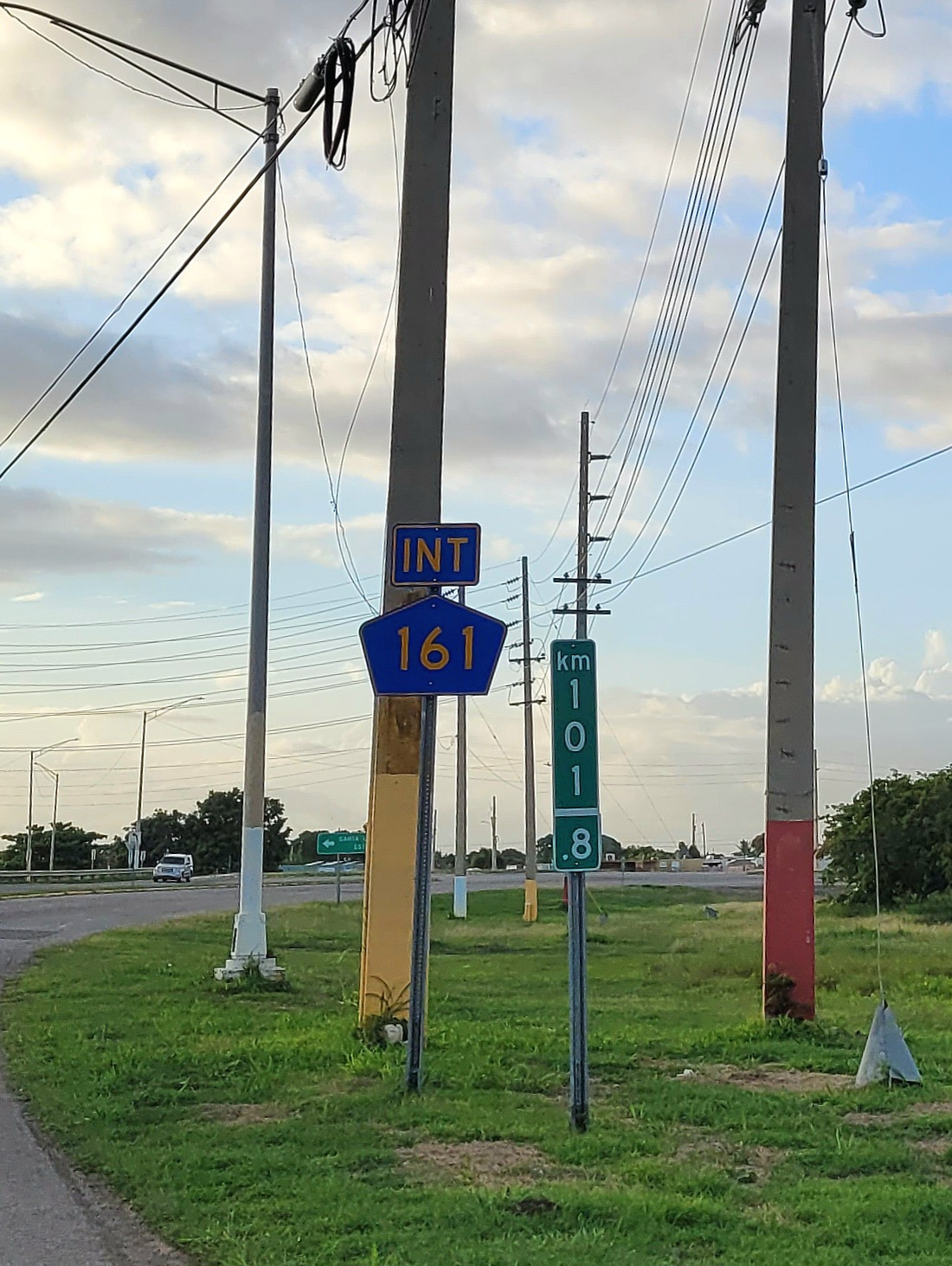
PR-1 west near PR-161 intersection in Felicia 1

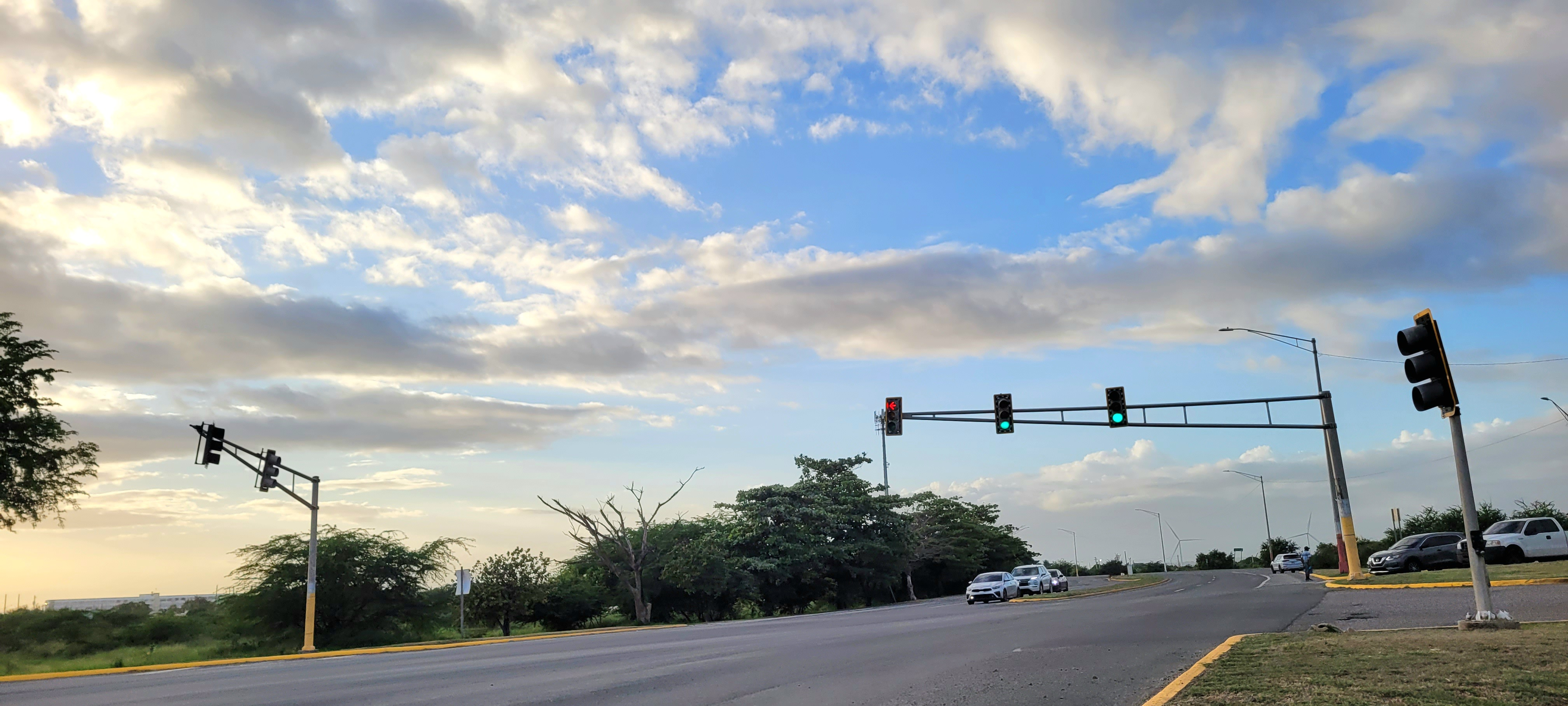
PR-161 west at PR-153 junction between downtown Santa Isabel and Boca Velázquez

Location	km	mi	Destinations	Notes
Boca Velázquez	2.4	1.5	PR-1 – Juana Díaz, Ponce	Western terminus of PR-161
Boca Velázquez–Santa Isabel barrio-pueblo line	1.4	0.87	PR-153 – Santa Isabel, Coamo	
Felicia 1	0.0	0.0	PR-1 – Salinas	Eastern terminus of PR-161
1.000 mi = 1.609 km; 1.000 km = 0.621 mi

== See also ==
- Luis Muñoz Marín
