= Unibón River =

River of Puerto Rico

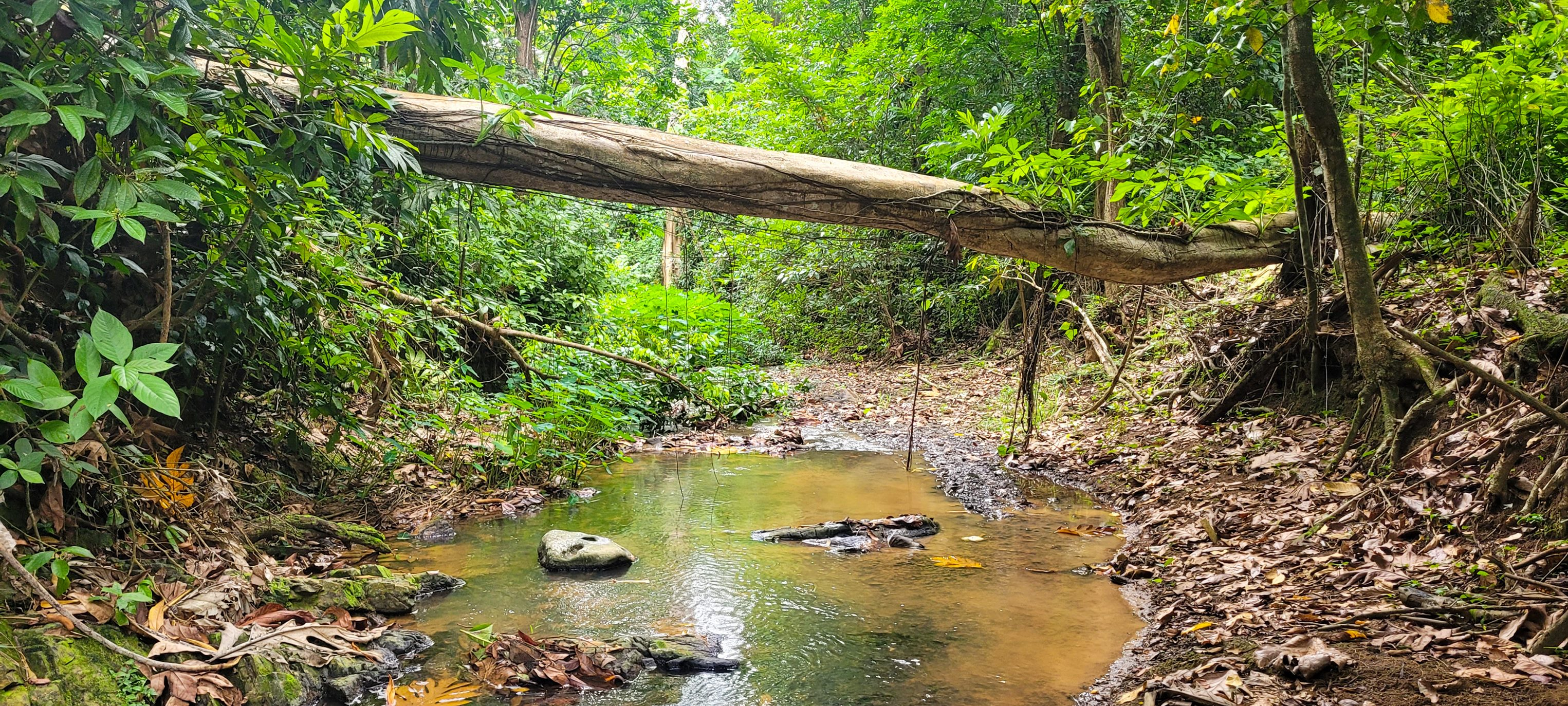
- Unibón River in Unibón barrio
- Native name: Río Unibón (Spanish)

Location
- Commonwealth: Puerto Rico
- Municipality: Morovis

Physical characteristics
- Source
  - coordinates: 18.3721720°N 66.3957257°W
  - elevation: 141 ft.

The Unibón River (Spanish: Río Unibón) is a river of Morovis, Vega Baja, and Corozal in Puerto Rico. There is a bridge that goes over the Unibón River.

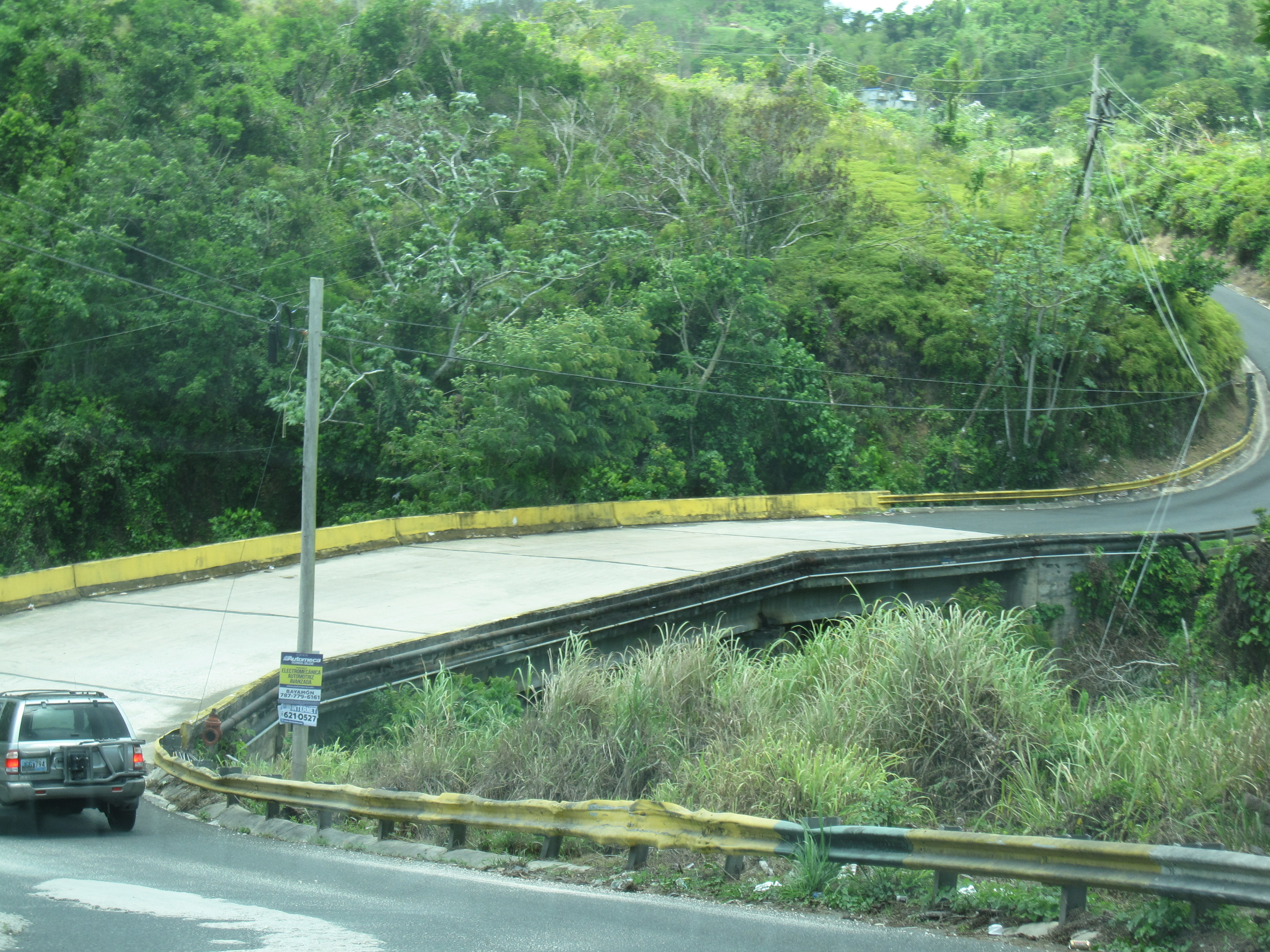
Bridge with Puerto Rico Highway 159 over Unibón River

== See also ==
- List of rivers of Puerto Rico
- Unibón
