= Carmen Deseda =

Puerto Rican pediatrician

- Education: University of Puerto Rico (BS); Universidad Central del Caribe (MD)
- Scientific career
- Fields: Pediatrics, epidemiology, travel medicine
- Workplaces: Universidad Central del Caribe; Epidemic Intelligence Service
- Military career
- Allegiance: United States
- Branch: PHS Commissioned Corps
- Service years: 1994–present
- Rank: Commander

Carmen C. Deseda is a Puerto Rican pediatrician. She is a medical officer and commander in the United States Public Health Service Commissioned Corps. Deseda served two terms as the state epidemiologist in the Puerto Rico Department of Health, first from 1994 to 2001, and later from January 2017 to March 2020.

== Education ==
In 1976, Deseda completed a bachelor of science in biology, magna cum laude, at University of Puerto Rico. She earned a doctor of medicine from Universidad Central del Caribe (UCC) in 1979. In 1980, at University of California, Los Angeles, Deseda studied pediatric infectious diseases under James Cherry and parasitology under Marietta Vogue. In 1980, she took a medical course in epidemiology in the parasitic division at the Epidemic Intelligence Service. Deseda completed a pediatric residency at St. Louis Children's Hospital in 1981. From 1982 to 1983, she was a pediatric resident at San Juan City Hospital.

== Career ==
Deseda was a pediatric clinical instructor in the emergency room at the San Juan City Hospital from 1985 to 1986 and at the department of pediatrics in the Universidad Central del Caribe (UCC), Bayamon Regional Hospital from 1986 to 1987. Between 1987 and 1989, she held faculty appointments at the Ashford Presbyterian Community Hospital including as coordinator of the first annual faculty meeting and chairman of the continuing medical education program. From 1991 to 1993, Deseda was a medical epidemiologist in the hepatitis branch of the Epidemic Intelligence Service in the Centers for Disease Control and Prevention (CDC). From 1993 to 1994, she was a medical epidemiologist and director of the massive immunization campaign measles eradication program at the CDC. From 1994 to 2001, Deseda was a pediatric associate professor at the UCC.

In 1994, Deseda joined the United States Public Health Service Commissioned Corps as a medical officer. She is a commander surgeon.

Deseda maintained a pediatric private practice in Hato Rey from 1985 to 1990. She was director of the Neonatal Hepatitis B Pilot Program with Ramon Ruiz Arnau at University Hospital in Bayamón, Puerto Rico. Starting in 2001, she is co-director of the Caribbean Travel Medicine Clinic in Hato Rey. She has served as a consultant for the American Red Cross Puerto Rico Region since 2002.

Deseda is a member of the International Society of Travel Medicine and served as president of the Latin American Society for Pediatric Infectious Diseases (SLIPE).

=== State Epidemiologist ===
From 1994 to 2001, Deseda served as State Epidemiologist in the Puerto Rico Department of Health. She was appointed to the role by Governor Pedro Rosselló.

In January 2017, Governor Ricardo Rosselló appointed Deseda as State Epidemiologist in the Puerto Rico Department of Health.

On March 19, 2020, journalists from the Center for Investigative Journalism (CPI) in Puerto Rico stated that Deseda, who had become more visible in the press since the resignation of Puerto Rico Health Secretary Rafael Rodríguez Mercado, did not have the credentials to be a state epidemiologist. In response, the Governor Wanda Vázquez Garced stated it was a team approach and that she supported Deseda in her role. On the same day, a group of Puerto Rican scientists were circulating a document asking for Deseda's resignation saying she had shown a lack of competence in the past and was not up to the task of dealing with the COVID-19 pandemic in Puerto Rico. In late March 2020, Deseda announced her resignation. She stated she had missed prior COVID-19 related press conferences due to family medical issues. Her relationship with the acting Health Secretary, Concepción Quiñones de Longo was not as robust as with Rodríguez Mercado.
