= Almirante Norte =

Barrio of Vega Baja, Puerto Rico

- Barrio
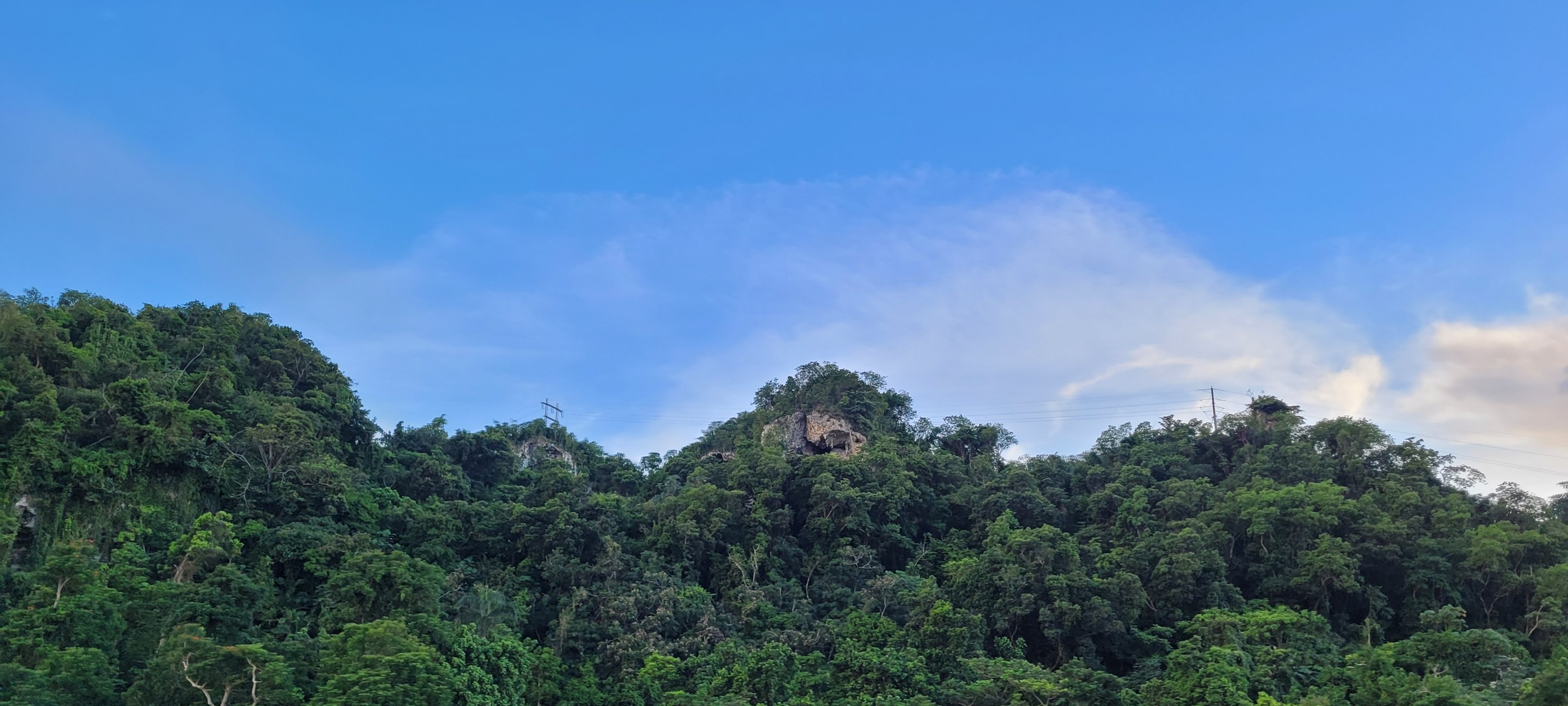
- Vega State Forest in Almirante Norte

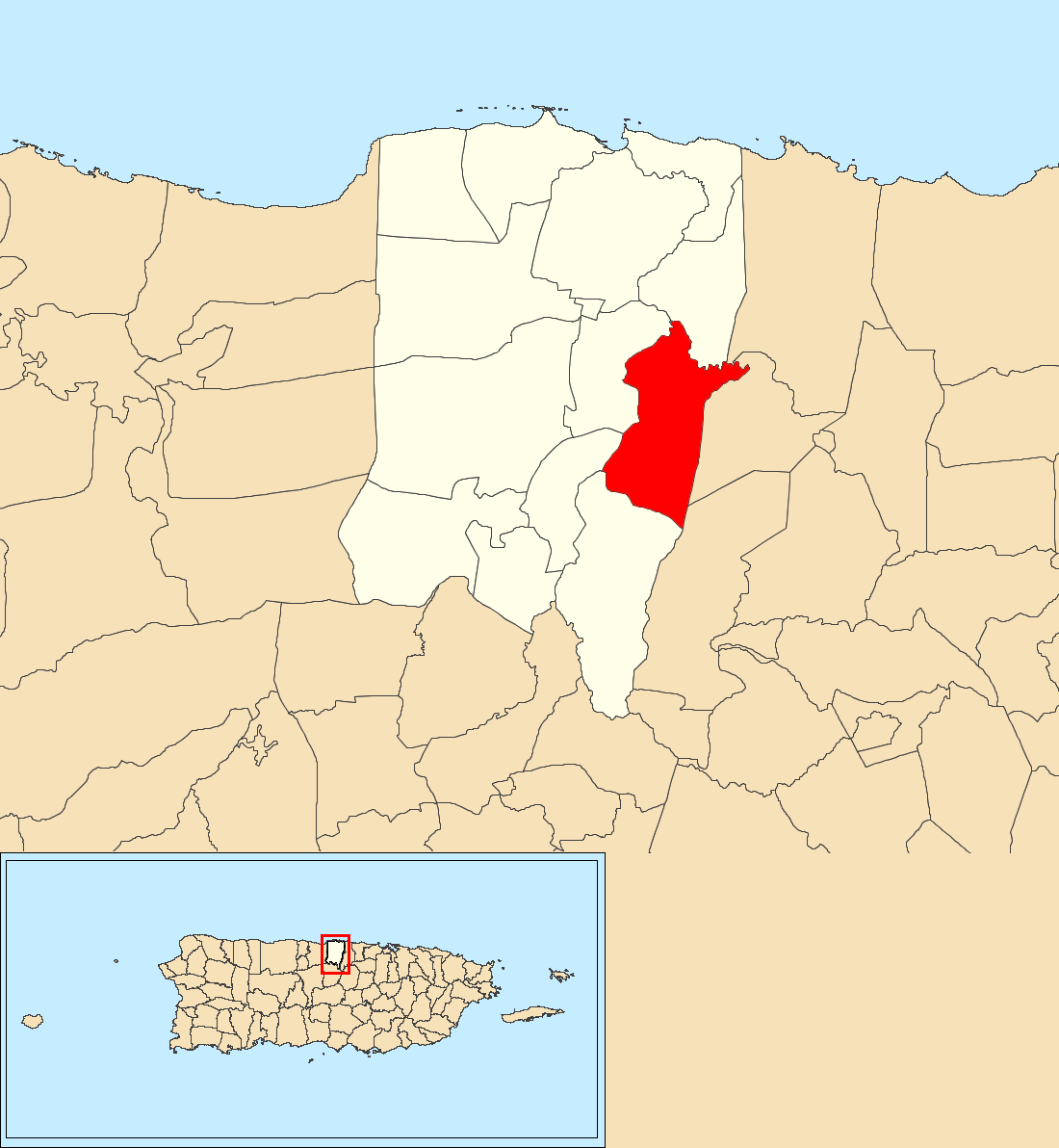
- Location of Almirante Norte within the municipality of Vega Baja shown in red

- Location of Puerto Rico
- Coordinates: 18°25′08″N 66°22′05″W
- Commonwealth: Puerto Rico
- Municipality: Vega Baja

Area
  - Total: 3.70 sq mi (9.6 km^{2})
  - Land: 3.69 sq mi (9.6 km^{2})
  - Water: 0.01 sq mi (0.026 km^{2})
- Elevation: 226 ft (69 m)

Population (2010)
  - Total: 4,397
  - Density: 1,191.6/sq mi (460.1/km^{2})
- Source: 2010 Census
- Time zone: UTC−4 (AST)

Almirante Norte is a barrio in the municipality of Vega Baja, Puerto Rico. Its population in 2010 was 4,397.

== History ==
Almirante Norte was in Spain's gazetteers until Puerto Rico was ceded by Spain in the aftermath of the Spanish–American War under the terms of the Treaty of Paris of 1898 and became an unincorporated territory of the United States. In 1899, the United States Department of War conducted a census of Puerto Rico finding that the population of Almirante Norte barrio was 902.

Historical population
Census	Pop.	Note	%±
1900	902		—
1910	977		8.3%
1920	1,378		41.0%
1930	1,583		14.9%
1940	2,007		26.8%
1950	2,114		5.3%
1960	1,981		−6.3%
1970	2,278		15.0%
1980	2,936		28.9%
1990	3,872		31.9%
2000	3,911		1.0%
2010	4,397		12.4%
U.S. Decennial Census; 1899 (shown as 1900) 1910-1930; 1930-1950 1960 1980-2000 2010

== Gallery ==
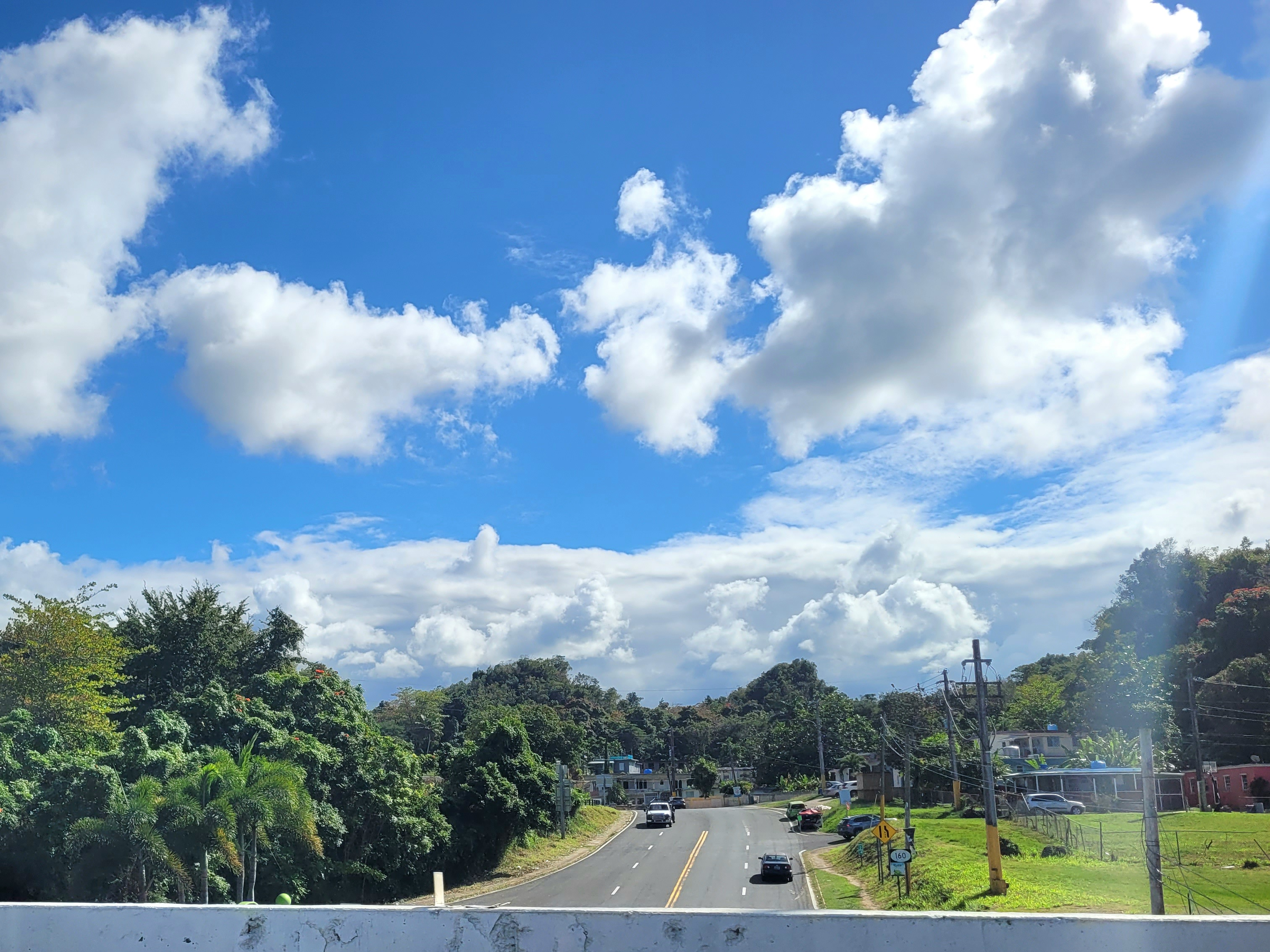
Puerto Rico Highway 160 in Almirante Norte

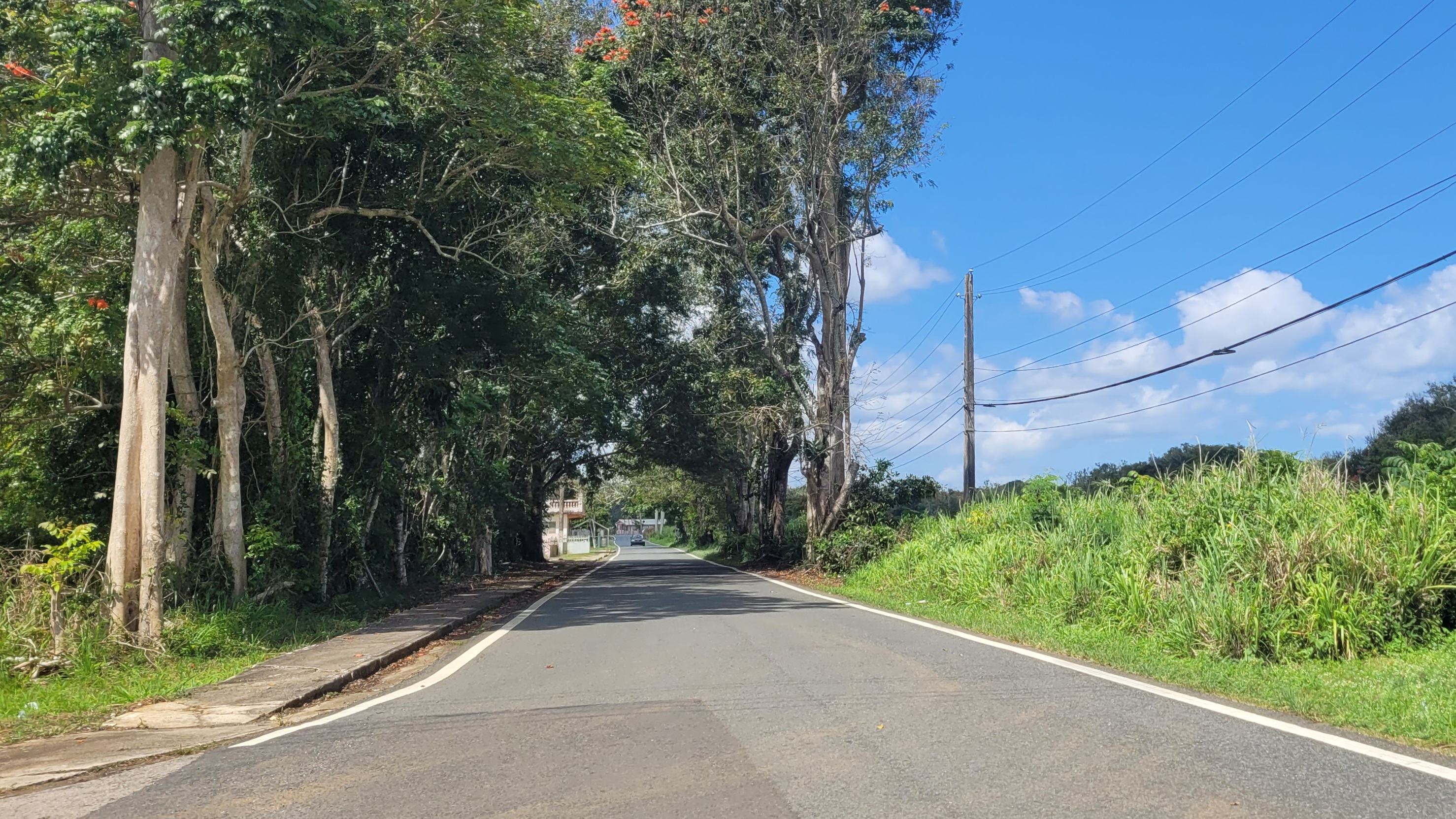
Puerto Rico Highway 675 in Almirante Norte

== See also ==
- List of communities in Puerto Rico
