= Unibón =

Barrio of Morovis, Puerto Rico

- Barrio
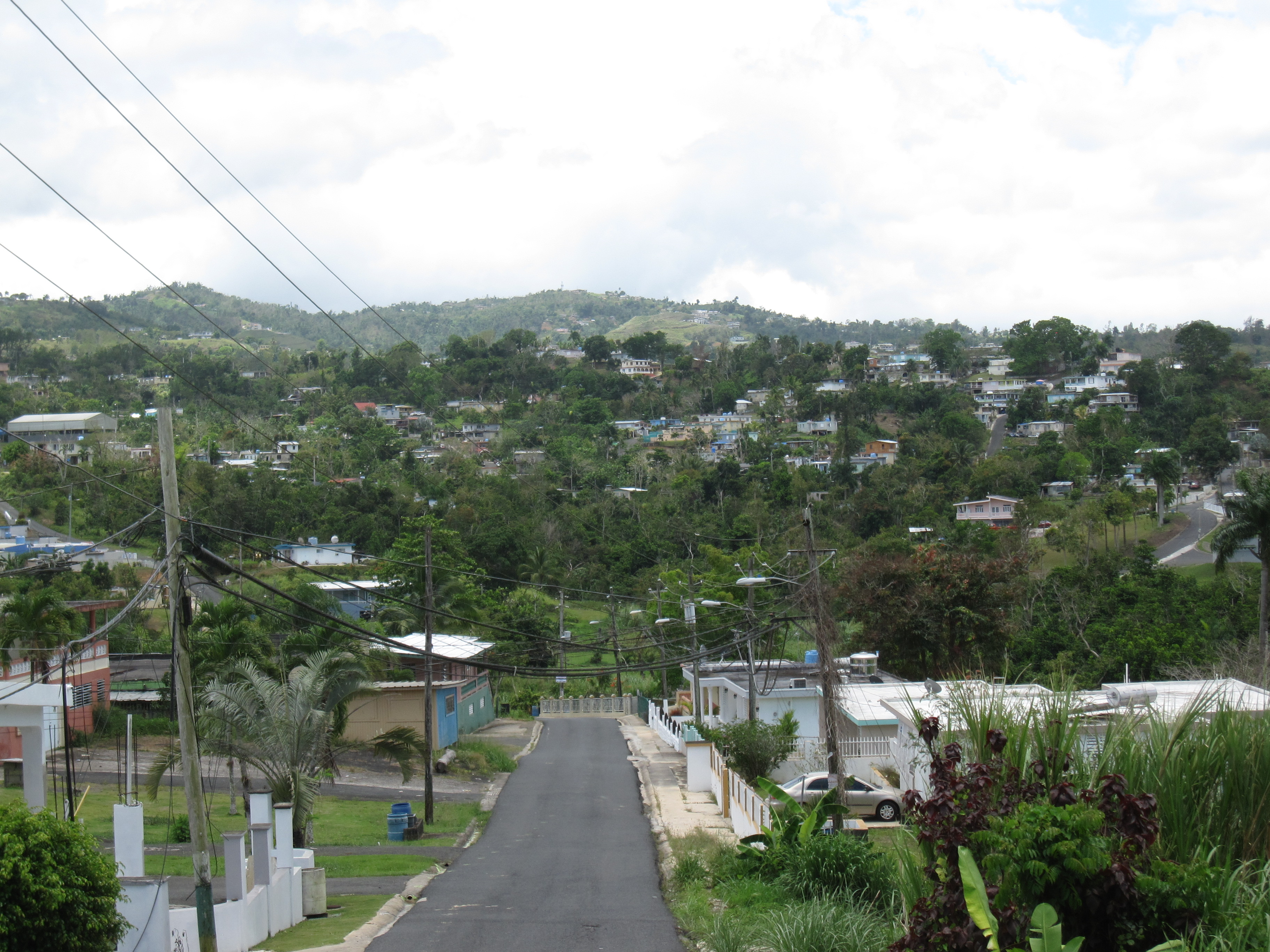
- Street and homes on mountainside in Unibón

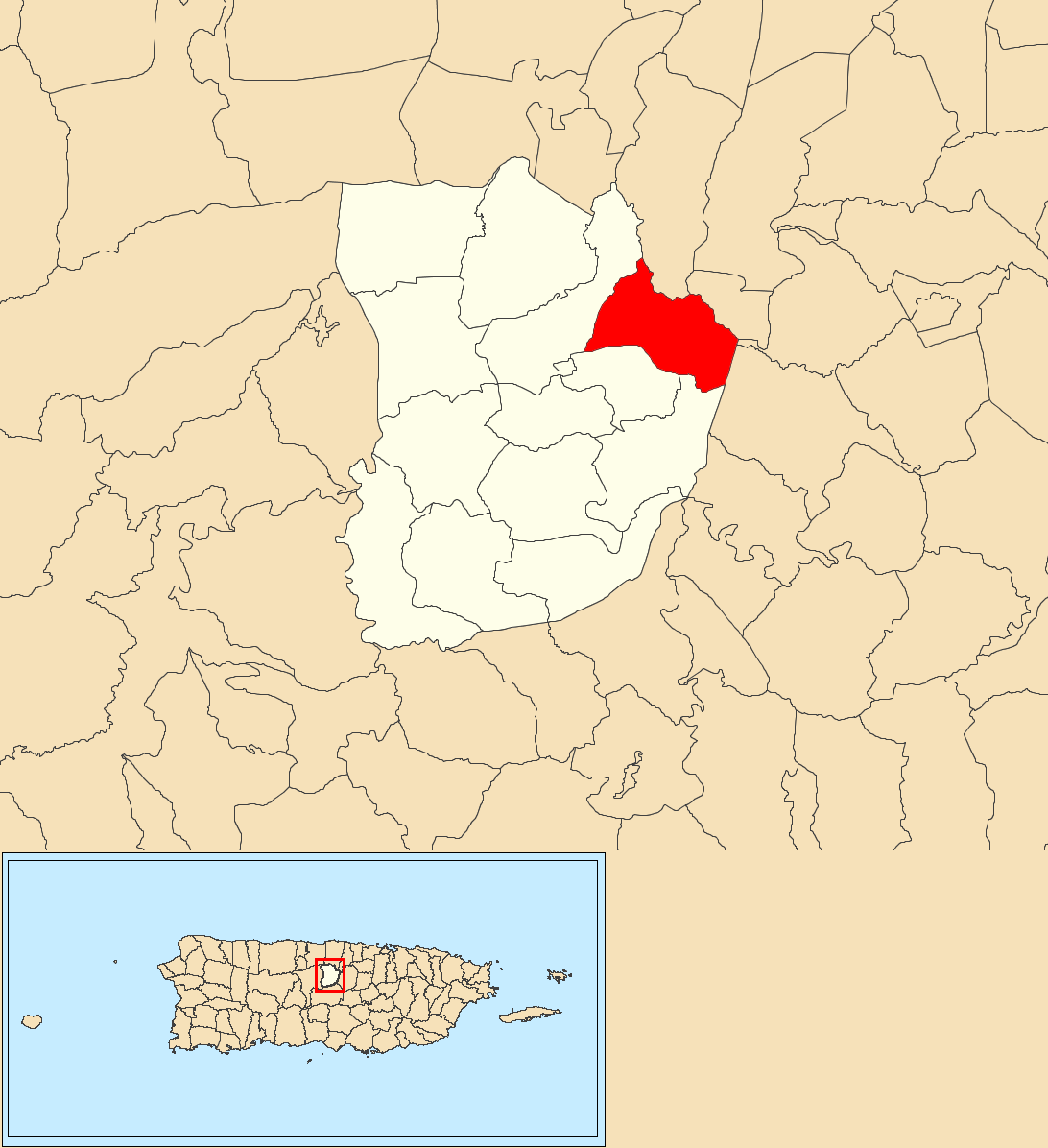
- Location of Unibón within the municipality of Morovis shown in red

- Location of Puerto Rico
- Coordinates: 18°20′07″N 66°22′59″W
- Commonwealth: Puerto Rico
- Municipality: Morovis

Area
  - Total: 2.7 sq mi (7.0 km^{2})
  - Land: 2.7 sq mi (7.0 km^{2})
  - Water: 0 sq mi (0 km^{2})
- Elevation: 817 ft (249 m)

Population (2010)
  - Total: 3,853
  - Density: 1,427/sq mi (551/km^{2})
- Source: 2010 Census
- Time zone: UTC−4 (AST)
- Zip code: 00687

Unibón is a barrio in the municipality of Morovis, Puerto Rico. Unibón has fifteen sectors and its population in 2010 was 3,853.

== History ==
Unibón was in Spain's gazetteers until Puerto Rico was ceded by Spain in the aftermath of the Spanish–American War under the terms of the Treaty of Paris of 1898 and became an unincorporated territory of the United States. In 1899, the United States Department of War conducted a census of Puerto Rico finding that the population of Unibón barrio was 643.

Historical population
| Census | Pop. | Note | %± |
|---|---|---|---|
| 1900 | 643 | | — |
| 1910 | 767 | | 19.3% |
| 1920 | 975 | | 27.1% |
| 1930 | 1,152 | | 18.2% |
| 1940 | 1,287 | | 11.7% |
| 1950 | 1,564 | | 21.5% |
| 1960 | 1,754 | | 12.1% |
| 1970 | 2,147 | | 22.4% |
| 1980 | 2,694 | | 25.5% |
| 1990 | 2,933 | | 8.9% |
| 2000 | 3,495 | | 19.2% |
| 2010 | 3,853 | | 10.2% |
U.S. Decennial Census; 1899 (shown as 1900) 1910-1930; 1930-1950 1980-2000 2010

== Sectors ==
Barrios (which are, in contemporary times, roughly comparable to minor civil divisions) in turn are further subdivided into smaller local populated place areas/units called sectores (sectors in English). The types of sectores may vary, from normally sector to urbanización to reparto to barriada to residencial, among others.

The following sectors are in Unibón barrio:

Parcelas Ramón Pabón, Sector Archilla, Sector El Puente, Sector Gallera, Sector Los Santos, Sector Padre Ibáñez, Sector Patrón, Sector Pedroza, Tramo Carretera 159, Urbanización Brisas del Río, Urbanización John Díaz, Urbanización Laderas del Río Unibón, Urbanización Matos, Urbanización Riberas de Unibón, and Urbanización Rodríguez.

The Unibón River (Spanish: Río Unibón) flows throw this barrio in Morovis and through other nearby municipalities including Vega Baja, and Corozal. There is a bridge that goes over the Unibón River in Unibón.

== Gallery ==
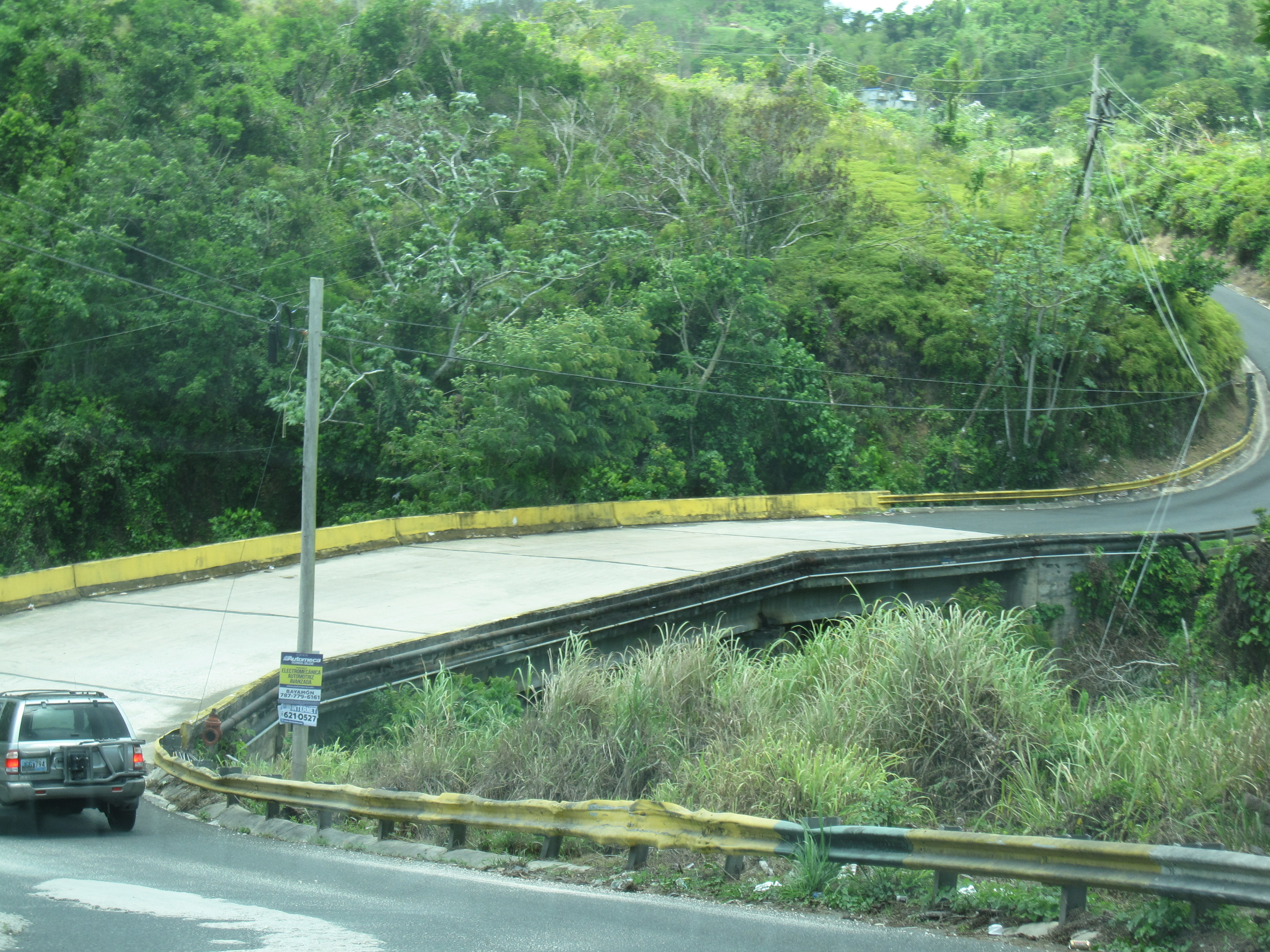
Bridge with Puerto Rico Highway 159 over Unibón River

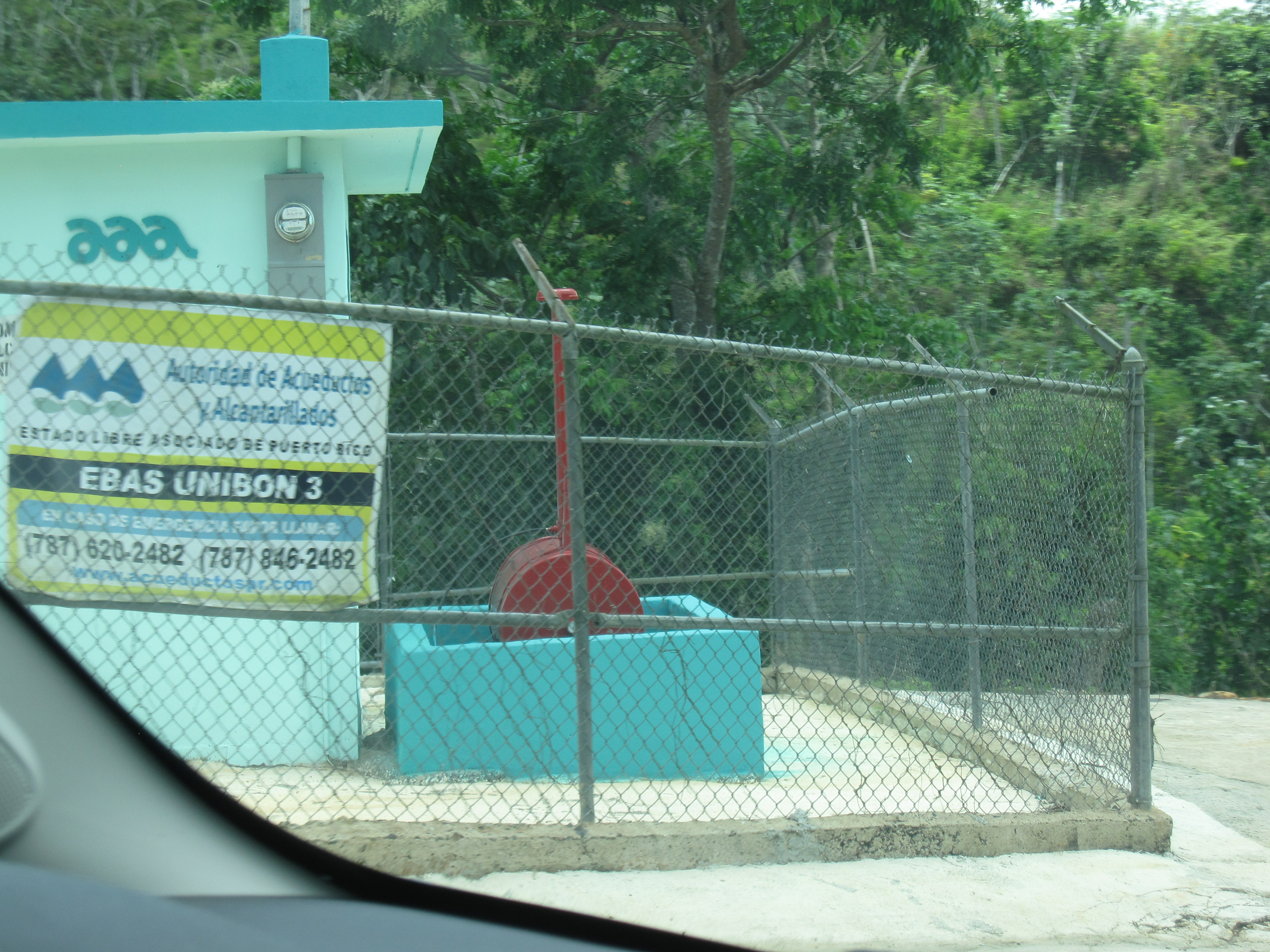
Puerto Rico Aqueducts and Sewers Authority in Unibón, Morovis

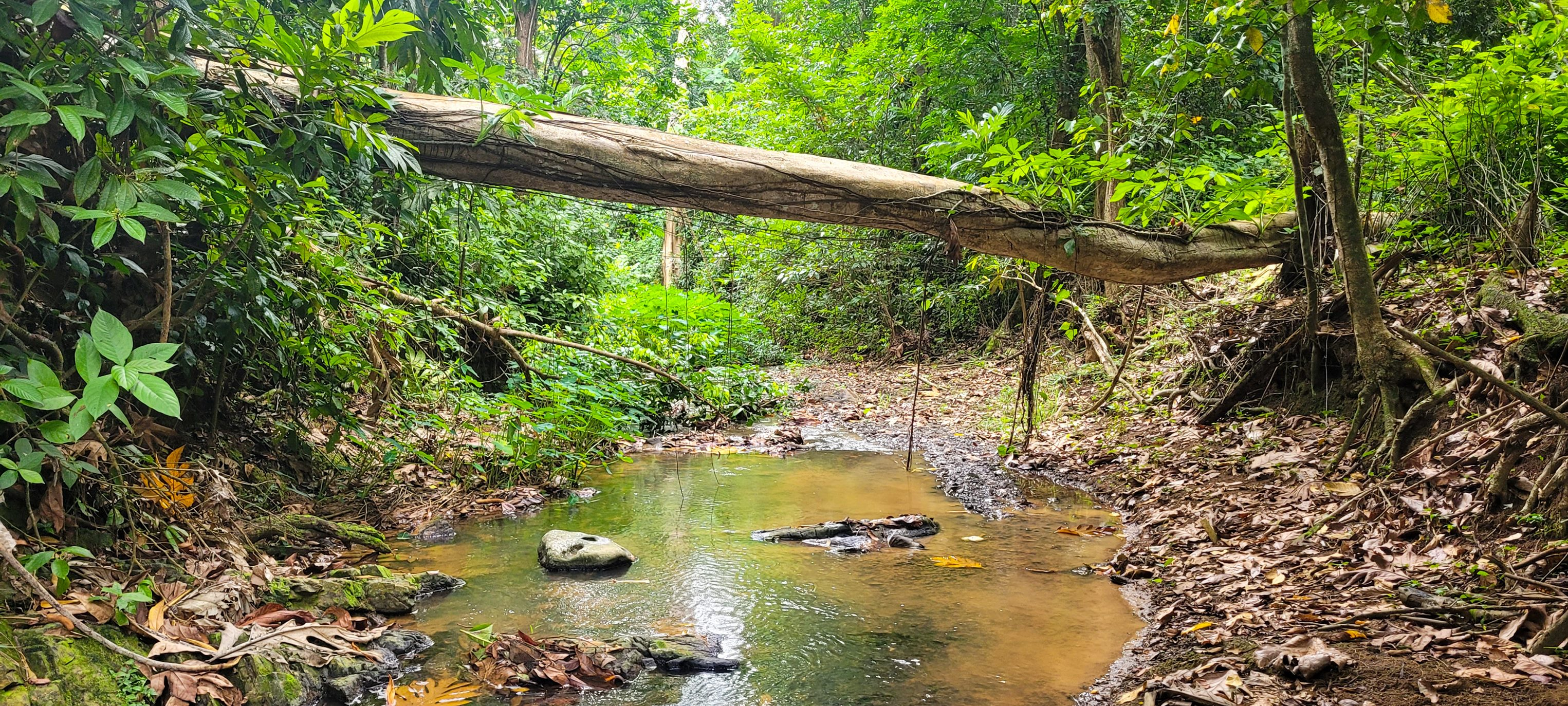
Unibón River

== See also ==
- List of communities in Puerto Rico
