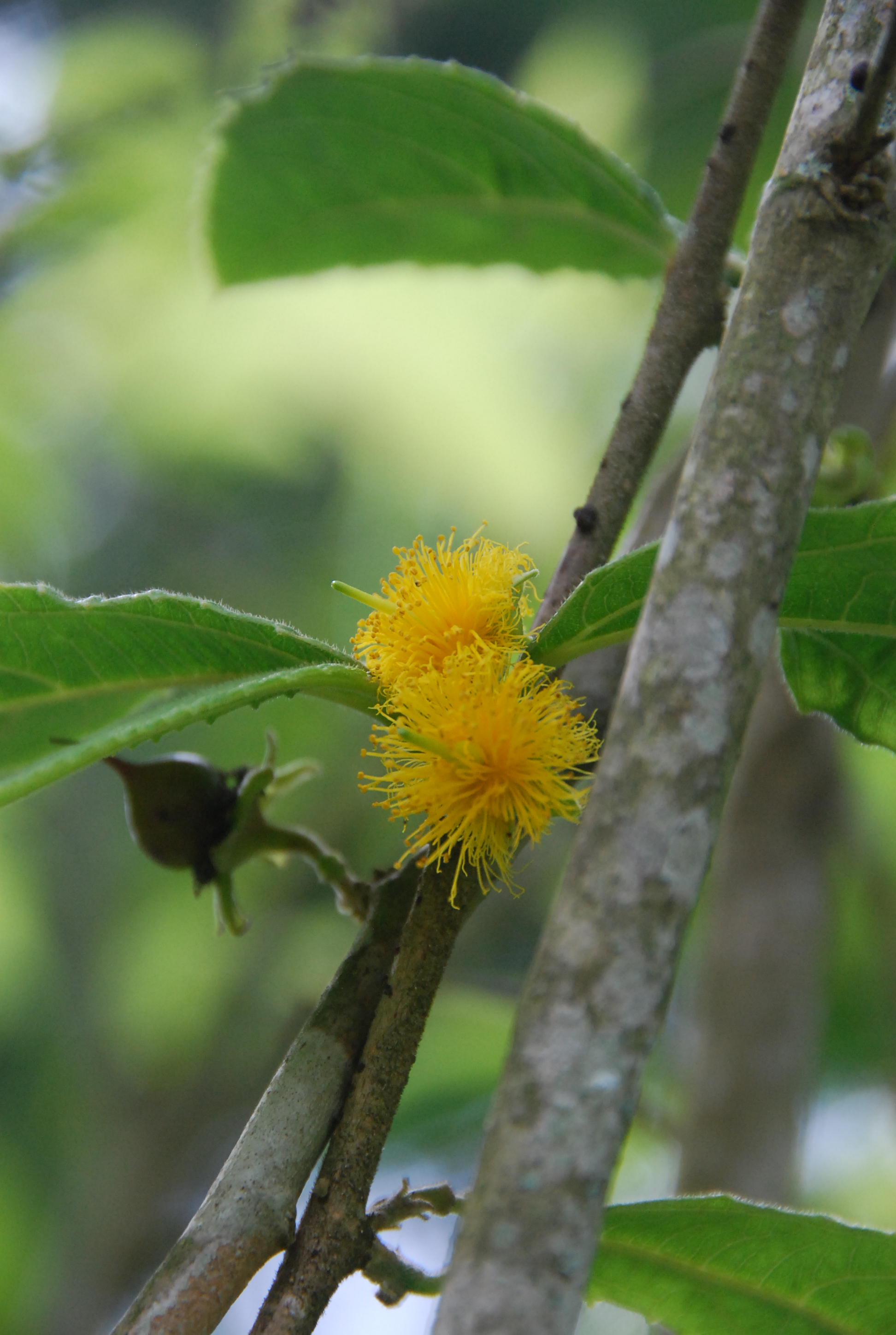

Conservation status
- Critically Endangered (IUCN 3.1)

- Critically Imperiled (NatureServe)

Scientific classification
- Kingdom: Plantae
- Clade: Tracheophytes
- Clade: Angiosperms
- Clade: Eudicots
- Clade: Rosids
- Order: Malpighiales
- Family: Salicaceae
- Genus: Banara
- Species: B. vanderbiltii

Binomial name
- Banara vanderbiltii Urban
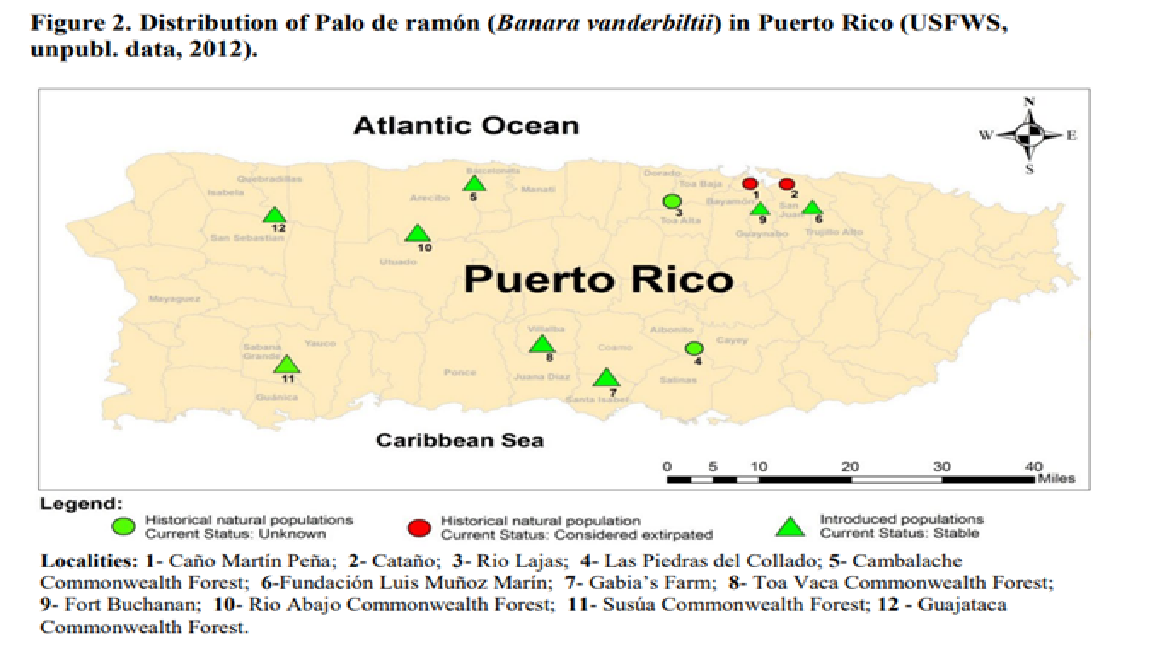

= Banara vanderbiltii =

Banara vanderbiltii Palo de Ramon

Species of flowering plant

Banara vanderbiltii is a rare species of plant in the willow family known by the common name Palo de Ramón. It originates from Puerto Rico in the hills of Rio Lajas, and the east peak of "Tetas de Cayey" mountains in Salinas, where there are fewer than 20 known individuals left in the wild. At the time it was listed as an endangered species of the United States in 1987, there were only six plants remaining.

The plant was discovered in 1899 and named for Cornelius Vanderbilt, who financed plant-collecting expeditions.

== Description ==
Banara vanderbiltii is a fruiting, small evergreen tree. The tree has an average stem diameter of 12.7 cm (5.0 in) and averages around 9.1 m (30 ft) in height. Each branch has alternating, simple leaves, about 5.08 cm (2.00 in) long and up to 12.7 cm (5.0 in) wide. Younger leaves are soft, becoming rougher with age. The leaves have prominent veins that run from the base of the plant and branch into three. The veins are not visible from underneath because of their angle. Newer branches and the stems next to the leaves are fuzzy, covered in small, yellow, hair-like structures. The fruit consists of berries containing many seeds, ranging from deep red to purple. The fruit's base is large, with pointed sepals and petals that make up the plant's flowers. From each yellow flower, there are many matching yellow stamens. They give the flower a round profile, with a diameter of half an inch, with a resulting velvety texture. Each flower contains both male and female reproductive structures, making them bisexual.

== Life history ==
The reproductive biology of Banara vanderbiltii is not well understood. Flowering occurs in May with fruit appearing from August through September. Seed dispersal occurs in September.

== Ecology ==
=== Diet ===
This species is a photoautotroph, deriving its energy from sunlight.

=== Pollinator behavior ===
Pollination mechanisms are not known. There is speculation that the bananaquit (Coereba flaveola) and the Puerto Rican spindalis (Spindalis portoricensis) have a role in this process because they have been seen eating the fruit.

=== Habitat ===
The plant is not typically found in low or medium elevations and is instead found in semi-evergreen coastal forests at high elevations on limestone substrates. It is limited to mixed evergreen and deciduous forests of northern Puerto Rico. It is adapted to the rugged terrain and moist soils of the area of the karst region.

=== Range ===
It is endemic to northern and south central Puerto Rico. It is located in area less than 100 to 250 km^{2} (40 to 100 sq mi).

== Conservation ==
=== Population ===
The species' abundance has increased since the time of listing in 1987. When the recovery plan was approved, Palo de Ramón (Banara vanderbiltii) was known to have 11 individuals in two populations. Since 1990, Puerto Rico Department of Natural and Environmental Resources has cultivated about 201 individuals of Palo de Ramón, and introduced them in eight localities. As of 2014, the 201 individuals of Palo de Ramón (Banara vanderbiltii) have survived.

=== Past and current distribution ===
The plant was known to occur near San Juan and Cataño long ago, but these occurrences have long since been extirpated by urban development. In 1991, there were two populations one at Rio Lajas in Dorado and another at Las Piedras del Collado in Salinas. It now occurs in one area along the northwestern coast, with one tiny population located near Cayey and a second, smaller one near Bayamón.

=== Major threats ===
Deforestation is the biggest threat to Palo de Ramón (Banara vanderbiltii). Its habitat is cut down for agriculture land, cattle grazing and limestone quarrying. Habitat fragmentation also has been a driver of extinction for these plants, as urban development has caused the population of the plant to decrease. Military exercises have also occurred nearby, with sections of the forest being trampled. Other reasons include the restricted range.

=== Listing under the Endangered Species Act (ESA) ===
In 1986, Banara vanderbiltii was petitioned to be listed under the ESA. It was determined to be an endangered species on January 14, 1987.

=== Recovery plan ===
The recovery plan was first established on March 15, 1991, and then was updated/revised on September 27, 2019. The present recovery plan goals for Banara vanderbiltii are to address the threats, most importantly, deforestation, that face the species. An integral part of the plan is to protect the newer populations that have grown and maintain the growth of the previous two populations. This has been a difficult task for conservationists, as there has been a significant push in urban development where the plant is native to. The next step toward recovery is to maintain the current populations of Palo de Ramón (Banara vanderbiltii). Finally, after these two steps are done, four additional stable populations will be established with high variability in age ranges to ensure population growth.

=== Five-year review ===
A five-year review was initiated in 2010, and finalized on January tenth 2014. The newest five-year review commenced in 2019, published on March 3, 2020. In the 2020 review, it was stated that the two populations present at listing have not been monitored since the listing in 1987. No information on the genetic variability within the species was found during the 2020 review. They speculate that restricted range and limited number of individuals suggests a low level of genetic variation. No recent changes in taxonomy are known for the species. Criterion 1 of the recovery plan, known populations are put under protective status, has been partially completed. The population of Palo de Ramón in Salinas is protected by Law No. 283 "Law to designate Las Piedras del Callado as Natural Reserve", but the population in Rios Lajas is on private land. Criterion 2 of establishing at least two new self-sustaining populations within protected land in the karst region has not been achieved. A new pest was identified, the lobate lac scale (Paratachardina pseudolobata).

=== Species status assessment ===
No Species Status Assessments (SSA's) are currently available for this species.
