= List of barrios and sectors of Dorado, Puerto Rico =

Like all municipalities of Puerto Rico, Dorado is subdivided into administrative units called barrios, which are, in contemporary times, roughly comparable to minor civil divisions, (and means wards or boroughs or neighborhoods in English). The barrios and subbarrios, in turn, are further subdivided into smaller local populated place areas/units called sectores (sectors in English). The types of sectores may vary, from normally sector to urbanización to reparto to barriada to residencial, among others.

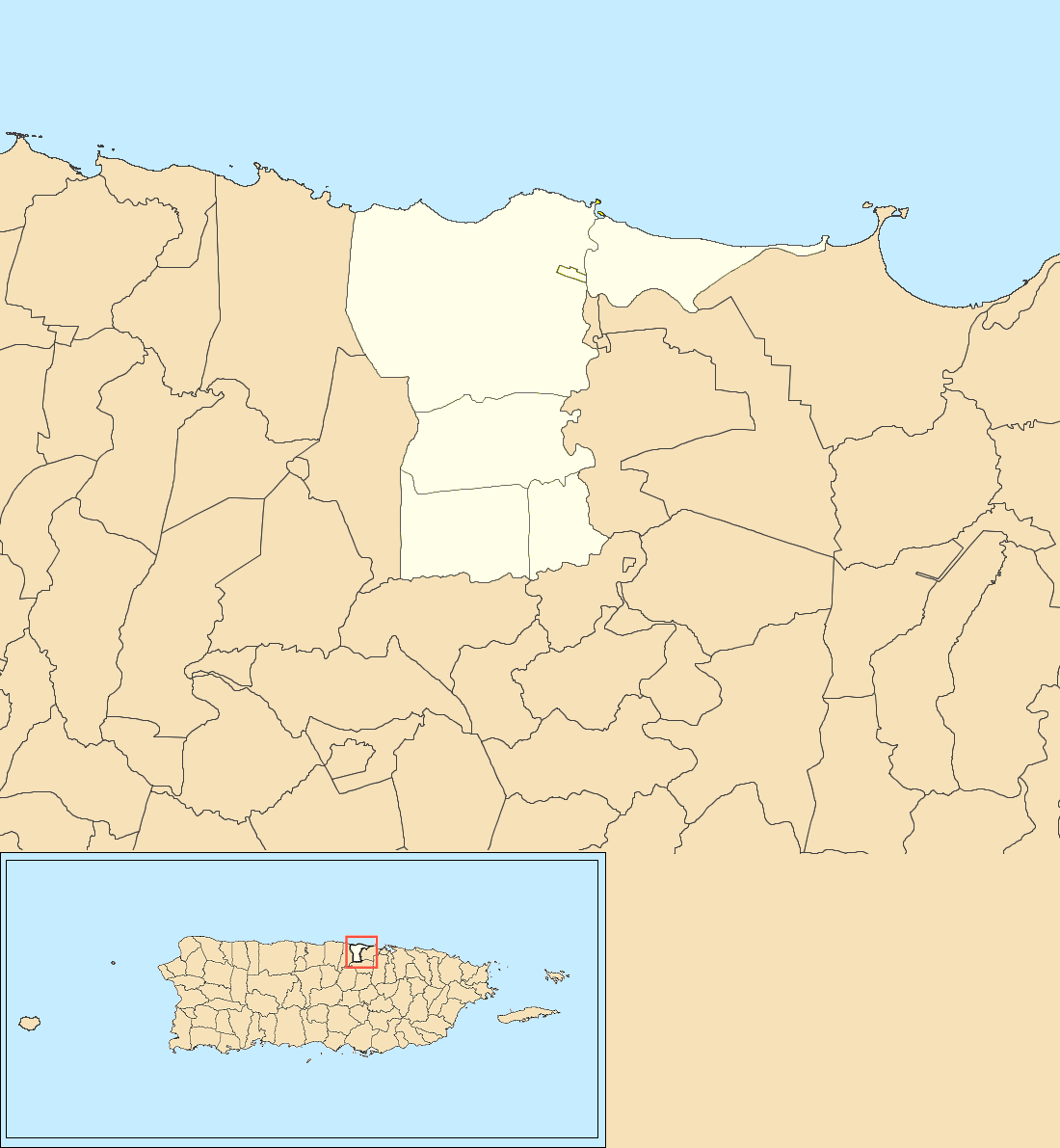
Dorado.map with barrio subdivisions

== List of sectors by barrio ==
=== Dorado barrio-pueblo ===
- Barriada San Antonio
- Residencial Manuel Morales
- Sector Finca Santa Bárbara
- Sector Juan Francisco
- Sector La Julia
- Sector Mameyal Playa (stretch of PR-165)
- Urbanización Brisas de Plata (before Villa Caíto)
- Urbanización Jardines de Dorado
- Urbanización Martorell
- Urbanización Sabanera Dorado

=== Espinosa ===
- Apartamentos Altos de Miraflores
- Comunidad Fortuna
- Comunidad La PRRA
- Comunidad Río Nuevo
- Parcelas Kuilan
- PR-2 stretch (both sides between kilometers 25.4 and 28.0)
- Reparto Del Valle
- Sector Abayarde
- Sector Concepción
- Sector Cuba Libre
- Sector Guarisco
- Sector Jácana
- Sector Kuilan
- Sector La Ínea
- Sector Laguna I y II
- Sector Los Morales
- Sector Mavito
- Sector Reparto Dorado
- Sector Rodríguez
- Sector Romanes
- Sector Silverio Mojica (Chícharo)
- Sector Tiburón
- Urbanización Golden Hills
- Urbanización Haciendas de Dorado
- Urbanización Los Montes
- Urbanización Miraflores
- Urbanización Monte Bello
- Urbanización Monte Mar
- Urbanización Monte Mayor
- Urbanización Monte Real
- Urbanización Monte Sol
- Urbanización Monte Verde
- Urbanización Palmar Dorado
- Urbanización Valle Dorado

=== Higuillar ===
- Apartamentos Brisas del Mar
- Apartamentos Camino Dorado
- Apartamentos Plantation Village Apartment 1
- Apartamentos Plantation Village Apartment 2
- Apartamentos Plantation Village Apartment 3
- Apartamentos Villas de Costa Mar
- Comunidad Mameyal
- Condominio Costa Dorada
- Condominio Fairway Village Apartments
- Condominio Ocean Villas
- Condominio Villa de Playa I y II
- Condominio Villas de Dorado
- Condominio Villas de Golf Este
- Condominio Villas de Golf Oeste
- Hogar Costa de Oro Village
- PR-695
- Reparto San Carlos
- Sector Aldea
- Sector Arenal
- Sector Costa de Oro
- Sector Cuatro Calles
- Sector Hormigas
- Sector La Poza
- Sector La Prá
- Sector Los Puertos
- Sector Marismilla
- Sector Monte Lindo
- Sector San Antonio
- Sector Santa Bárbara
- Sector Sardinera
- Sector Villa 2000
- Sector Villa Palmas
- Sector Villa Plata
- Sector Villa Santa
- Urbanización Brighton Country Club
- Urbanización Dorado Beach Cottages
- Urbanización Dorado Beach East
- Urbanización Dorado Beach Estate
- Urbanización Dorado Beach
- Urbanización Dorado Country Estate
- Urbanización Dorado Del Mar
- Urbanización Dorado Reef
- Urbanización Doraville
- Urbanización Gable Breeze
- Urbanización Hacienda Mi Querido Viejo
- Urbanización Jardín Dorado
- Urbanización Los Prados de Dorado Norte y Sur
- Urbanización Monte Elena
- Urbanización Paisajes de Dorado
- Urbanización Paseo de Dorado
- Urbanización Paseo del Mar
- Urbanización Paseo del Sol
- Urbanización Paseo Las Olas
- Urbanización Paseo Las Palmas
- Urbanización Paseo Los Corales
- Urbanización Paseo Real
- Urbanización Plantation Village
- Urbanización Quintas de Dorado
- Urbanización Ritz-Carlton Reserve East Beach
- Urbanización Ritz-Carlton Reserve West Beach
- Urbanización The Enclave
- Urbanización The Greens
- Urbanización Villamar

=== Maguayo ===
- Parcelas El Cotto
- Sector Abra
- Sector Calandria
- Sector Camino Los Nieves
- Sector Cotto Martell
- Sector Cuatro Calles
- Sector El Cotto
- Sector Los Bloise
- Sector Los Dávila
- Sector Los Torres
- Sector Maguayo Adentro
- Sector Maracayo
- Sector Martell
- Sector Maysonet I y II
- Sector Polvorín
- Sector Río Nuevo (PR-693)
- Sector Santa Rosa (Jazmín, Guayabo, Combate)
- Urbanización Alturas de Plata
- Urbanización Bosque Dorado
- Urbanización Valle del Dorado

=== Mameyal ===
There are no sectors in Mameyal barrio which is a beach area, but 11 residents were counted in Mameyal in the 2010 US Census. There is a large natural reserve in Mameyal called Reserva Natural Playa Grande El Paraíso.

=== Río Lajas ===
- Parcelas Viejas
- Sector Alturas de Río Lajas
- Sector El Rincón
- Sector Las Corozas
- Sector Villa Iriarte
- Urbanización Molinos del Río

== See also ==
- List of communities in Puerto Rico
