= Casa del Rey =

Historic building in Dorado, Puerto Rico

- U.S. National Register of Historic Places
- Puerto Rico Historic Sites and Zones
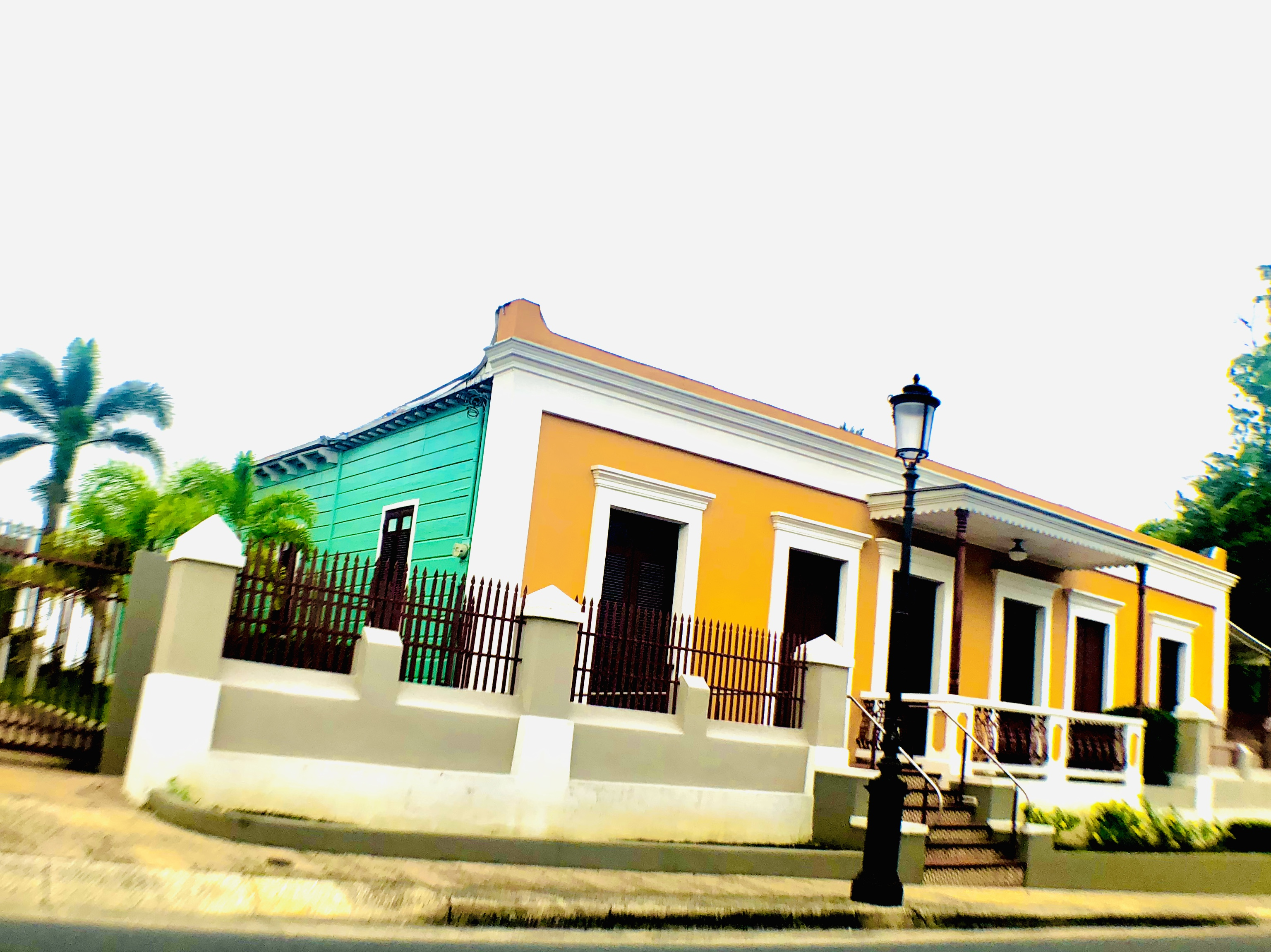
- Main facade, in September 2018

- Location within Puerto Rico
- Location: 292 Méndez Vigo Street; Dorado, Puerto Rico
- Coordinates: 18°27′32″N 66°15′38″W
- Built: 1823
- Architectural style: Spanish military neoclassic
- NRHP reference No.: 89000408
- RNSZH No.: 2000-(RMSJ)-00-JP-SH

Significant dates
- Added to NRHP: May 19, 1989
- Designated RNSZH: February 3, 2000

Casa del Rey (Spanish for 'house of the king') is a historic building and former cabildo located in the historic center of Dorado, Puerto Rico. Throughout its history it has also been known as the Militia Guard Headquarters (Cuartel de la Guardia de Milicias), Parador del Rey, and the Municipal Jail of Dorado (Cárcel Municipal de Dorado).

The building, the oldest in town, provided housing for Spanish government personnel and also served as the regional military headquarters. In 1848, Jacinto López purchased the structure. In converting it into a residence, López added two wings which created a U-shaped configuration around an interior patio. In 1871, Casa del Rey became the home of Manuel Alonso y Pacheco, Puerto Rico's notable romantic writer.

It was listed on the U.S. National Register of Historic Places in 1989 and on the Puerto Rico Register of Historic Sites and Zones in 2000. The house was restored by the Institute of Puerto Rican Culture in 1978 and is now a local history museum.

== See also ==
- Paradores in Puerto Rico
