= Mameyal =

Barrio of Dorado, Puerto Rico

- Barrio
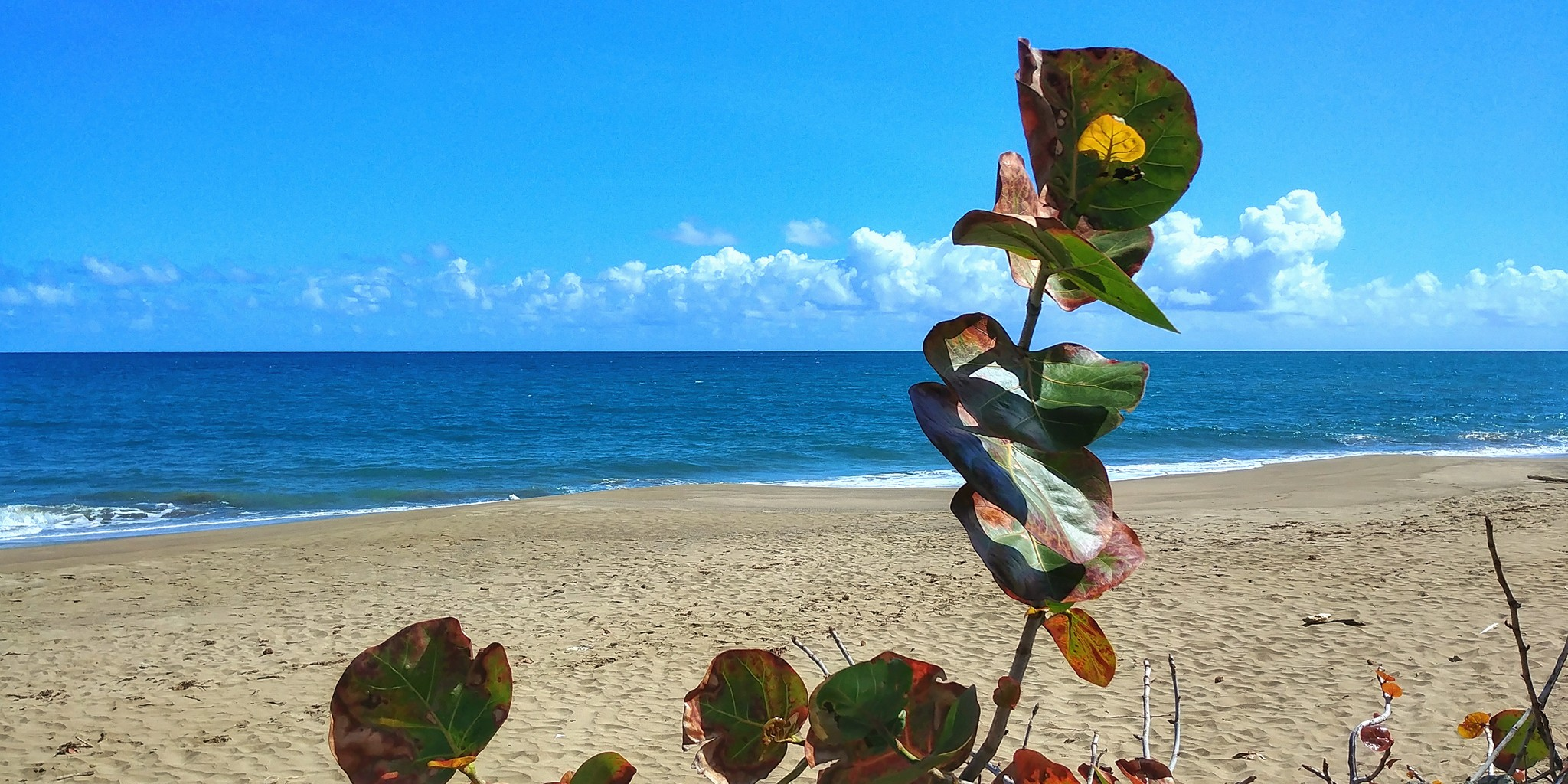
- Parchola Beach in Mameyal

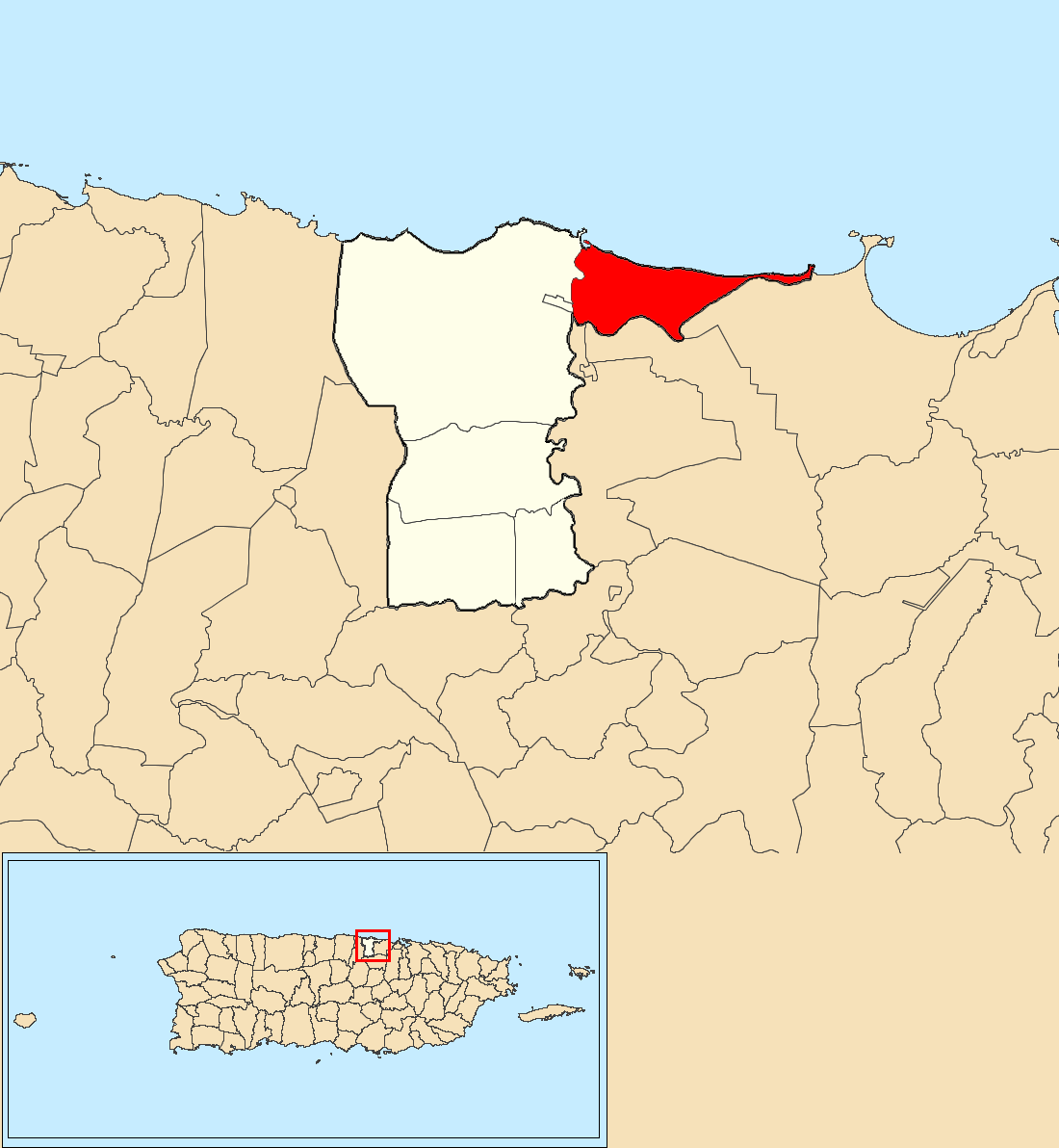
- Location of Mameyal within the municipality of Dorado shown in red

- Location within the Caribbean
- Coordinates: 18°27′58″N 66°13′59″W
- Commonwealth: Puerto Rico
- Municipality: Dorado

Area
  - Total: 3.47 sq mi (9.0 km^{2})
  - Land: 2.66 sq mi (6.9 km^{2})
  - Water: 0.81 sq mi (2.1 km^{2})
- Elevation: 0 ft (0 m)

Population (2010)
  - Total: 11
  - Density: 4.1/sq mi (1.6/km^{2})
- Source: 2010 Census
- Time zone: UTC−4 (AST)
- ZIP Code: 00646

Mameyal is a barrio in the municipality of Dorado, Puerto Rico. Its population in 2010 was 11.

== History ==
Mameyal was in Spain's gazetteers until Puerto Rico was ceded by Spain in the aftermath of the Spanish–American War under the terms of the Treaty of Paris of 1898 and became an unincorporated territory of the United States. In 1899, the United States Department of War conducted a census of Puerto Rico finding that the population of Mameyal barrio was 169.

Historical population
Census	Pop.	Note	%±
1900	169		—
1910	529		213.0%
1920	581		9.8%
1930	474		−18.4%
1940	478		0.8%
1950	273		−42.9%
1960	92		−66.3%
1970	73		−20.7%
1980	58		−20.5%
1990	37		−36.2%
2000	36		−2.7%
2010	11		−69.4%
U.S. Decennial Census; 1899 (shown as 1900) 1910-1930; 1930-1950 1980-2000 2010

== Sectors ==
Barrios (which are, in contemporary times, roughly comparable to minor civil divisions) in turn are further subdivided into smaller local populated place areas/units called sectores (sectors in English). The types of sectores may vary, from normally sector to urbanización to reparto to barriada to residencial, among others.

Comunidad Mameyal is a sector which is actually counted in Higuillar barrio.

== See also ==
- List of communities in Puerto Rico
- List of barrios and sectors of Dorado, Puerto Rico
