= Dorado barrio-pueblo =

Historical and administrative center (seat) of Dorado, Puerto Rico

Dorado barrio-pueblo Pueblo de Dorado
- Municipality seat
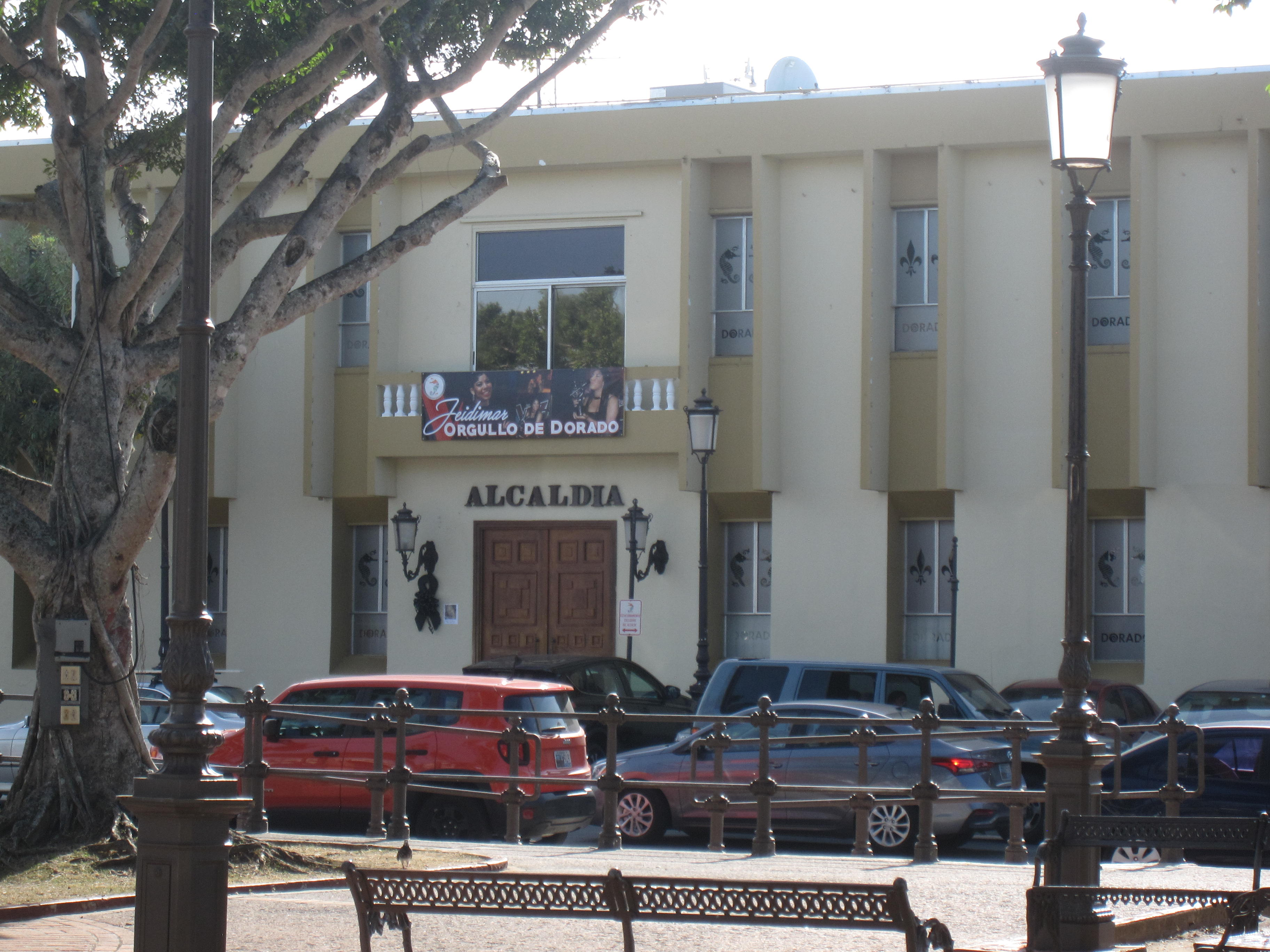
- Town Hall in Dorado barrio-pueblo

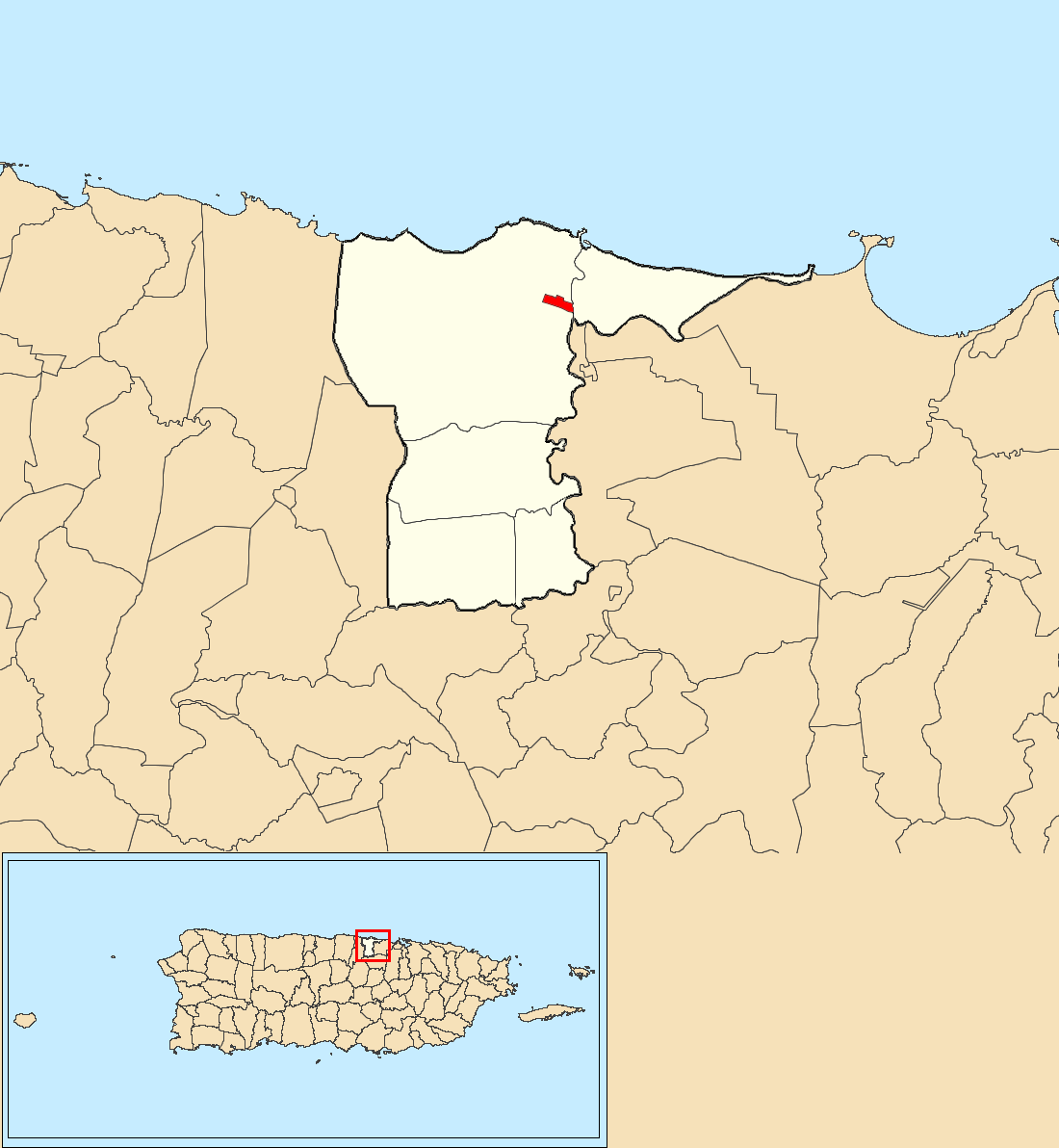
- Location of Dorado barrio-pueblo within the municipality of Dorado shown in red

- Location within the Caribbean
- Coordinates: 18°27′34″N 66°15′41″W
- Commonwealth: Puerto Rico
- Municipality: Dorado

Area
  - Total: 0.07 sq mi (0.18 km^{2})
  - Land: 0.07 sq mi (0.18 km^{2})
  - Water: 0 sq mi (0 km^{2})
- Elevation: 52 ft (16 m)

Population (2010)
  - Total: 780
  - Density: 11,142.9/sq mi (4,302.3/km^{2})
- Source: 2000 Census
- ZIP Code: 00646

Dorado barrio-pueblo is a barrio and the administrative center (seat) of Dorado, a municipality in Puerto Rico. Its population in 2010 was 780. It is one of the six barrios in the municipality of Dorado, Puerto Rico, along with Espinosa, Higuillar, Maguayo, Mameyal and Río Lajas.

As was customary in Spain, the municipality in Puerto Rico has a barrio called pueblo which contains a central plaza, the municipal buildings (city hall), and a Catholic church. Fiestas patronales (patron saint festivals) are held in the central plaza every year.

== The central plaza and its church ==
The central plaza, or square, is a place for official and unofficial recreational events and a place where people can gather and socialize from dusk to dawn. The Laws of the Indies, Spanish law, which regulated life in Puerto Rico in the early 19th century, stated the plaza's purpose was for "the parties" (celebrations, festivities) (Spanish: a propósito para las fiestas), and it was required to be proportionally large enough for the local population. (Spanish: grandeza proporcionada al número de vecinos). These Spanish regulations also stated that the streets nearby should be comfortable portals for passersby, protecting them from the elements: sun and rain.

Located across the central plaza in Dorado barrio-pueblo is the Parroquia San Antonio de Padua (English: Church San Antonio de Padua of Dorado), named after Portuguese Catholic priest Saint Anthony of Padua. The church was built from 1826 throughout July 1848.

== History ==
Dorado barrio-pueblo was in Spain's gazetteers until Puerto Rico was ceded by Spain in the aftermath of the Spanish–American War under the terms of the Treaty of Paris of 1898 and became an unincorporated territory of the United States. In 1899, the United States Department of War conducted a census of Puerto Rico finding that the population of Dorado Pueblo was 937.

In July 2020, Federal Emergency Management Agency appropriated funds for repairs to Dorado's plaza.

Historical population
Census	Pop.	Note	%±
1900	937		—
1910	946		1.0%
1920	1,163		22.9%
1930	2,053		76.5%
1940	2,211		7.7%
1950	2,537		14.7%
1960	2,120		−16.4%
1970	0		−100.0%
1980	1,347		—
1990	1,081		−19.7%
2000	994		−8.0%
2010	780		−21.5%
U.S. Decennial Census; 1899 (shown as 1900) 1910-1930; 1930-1950 1980-2000 2010

== Sectors ==
Barrios (which are, in contemporary times, roughly comparable to minor civil divisions) in turn are further subdivided into smaller local populated place areas/units called sectores (sectors in English). The types of sectores may vary, from normally sector to urbanización to reparto to barriada to residencial, among others.

The following sectors are in Dorado barrio-pueblo:

Barriada San Antonio, Residencial Manuel Morales, Sector Finca Santa Bárbara, Sector Juan Francisco, Sector La Julia, Sector Mameyal Playa (stretch of PR-165), Urbanización Brisas de Plata (before Villa Caíto), Urbanización Jardines de Dorado, Urbanización Martorell, and Urbanización Sabanera Dorado.

In Dorado barrio-pueblo is part of the Dorado urban zone.

== Gallery ==
Places in Dorado barrio-pueblo:

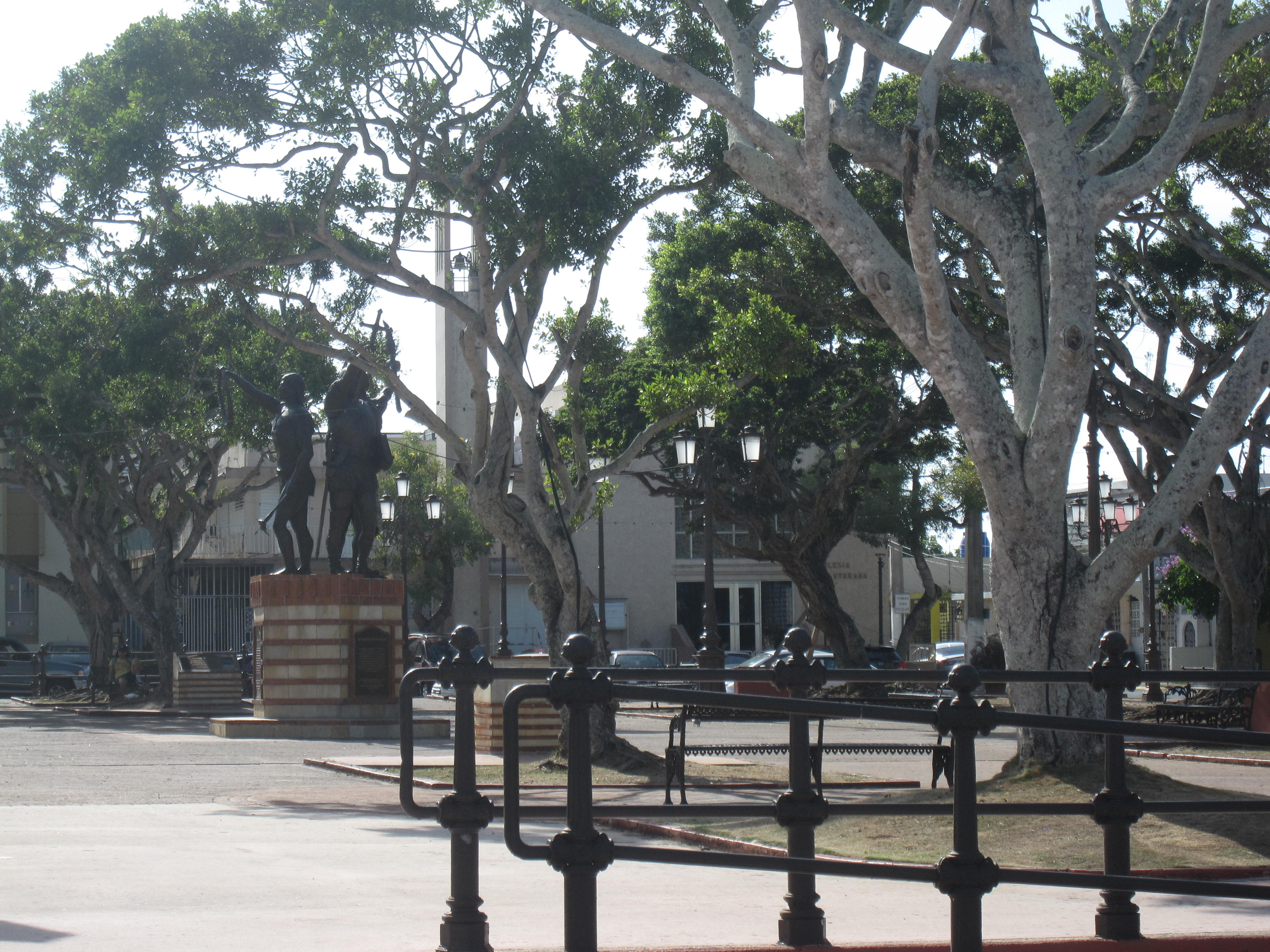
The plaza features shade

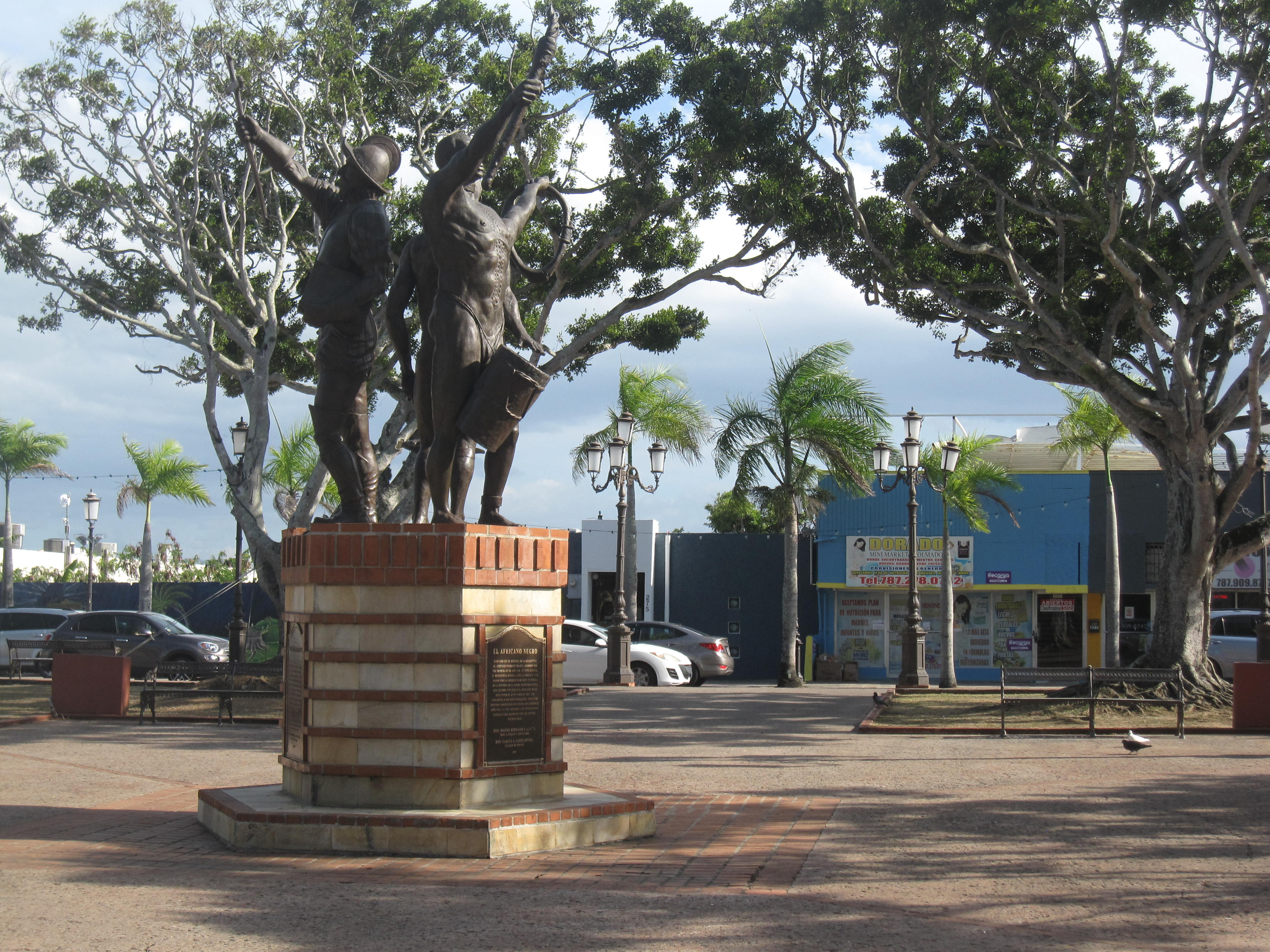
The plaza features monuments

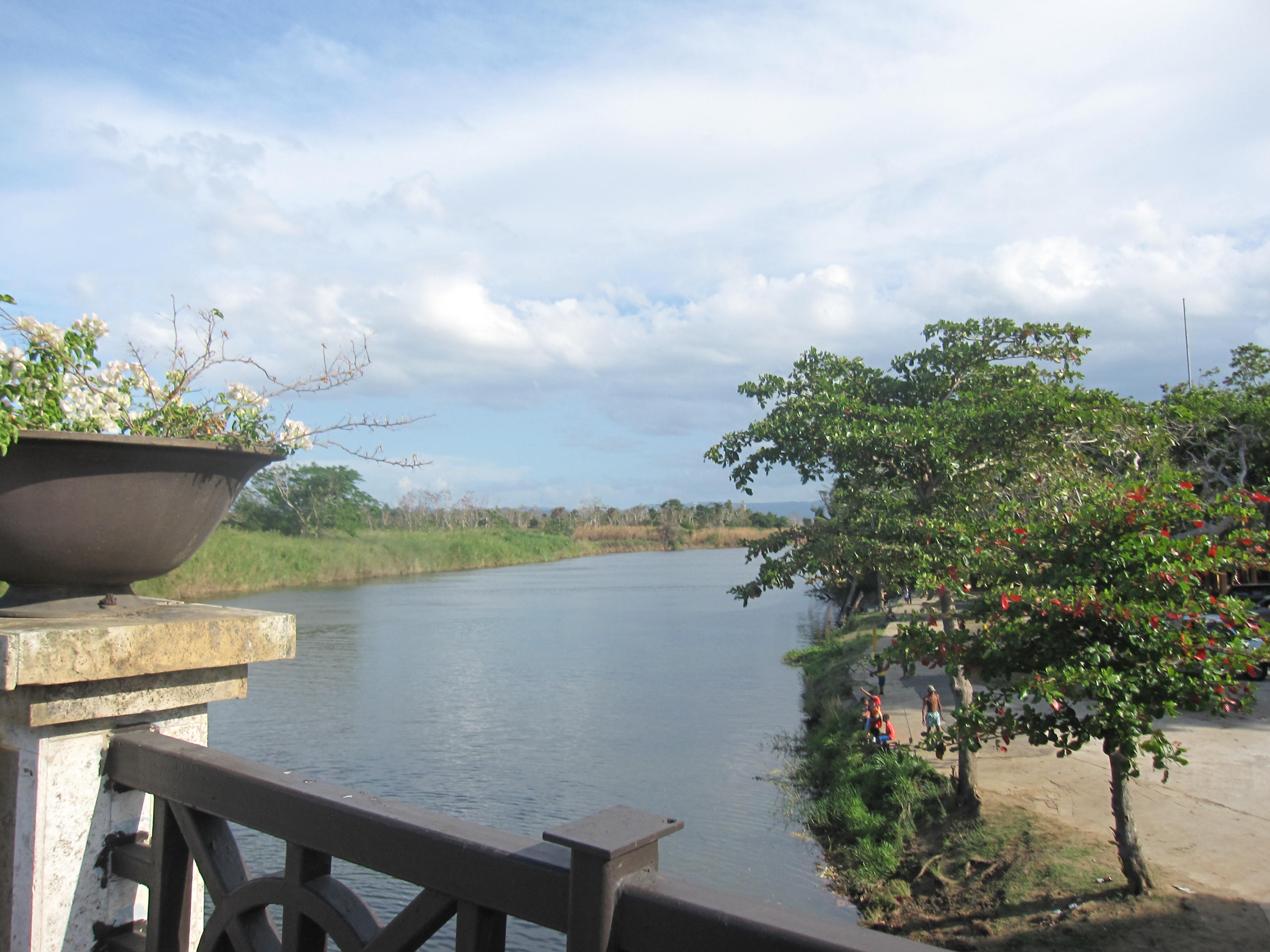
People can be seen on the banks of Río de la Plata from Puente Hermanos Meléndez

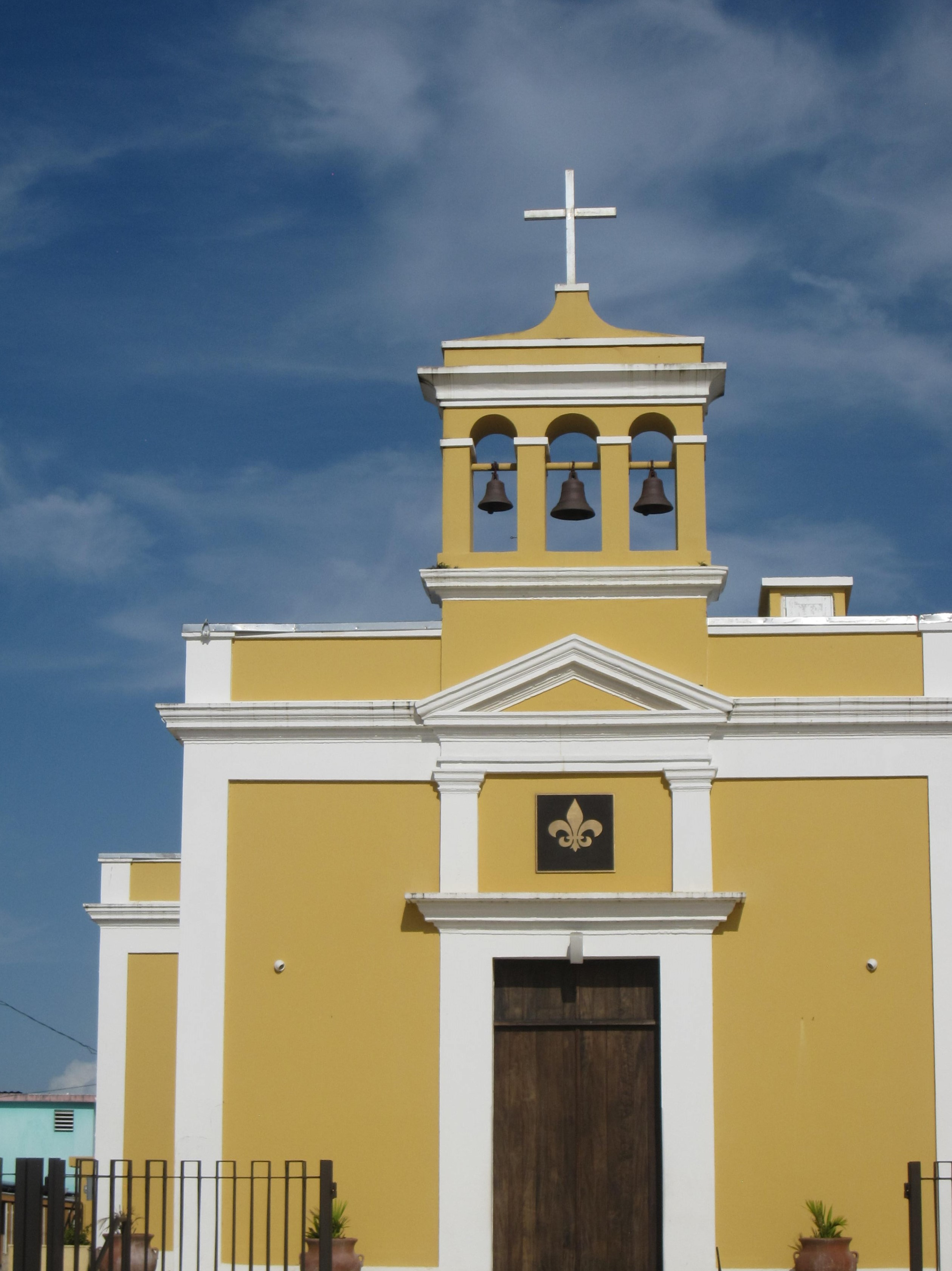
San Antonio de Padua Catholic church

== See also ==
- List of communities in Puerto Rico
- List of barrios and sectors of Dorado, Puerto Rico
