= Río Lajas, Dorado, Puerto Rico =

Barrio of Puerto Rico

Río Lajas
- Barrio
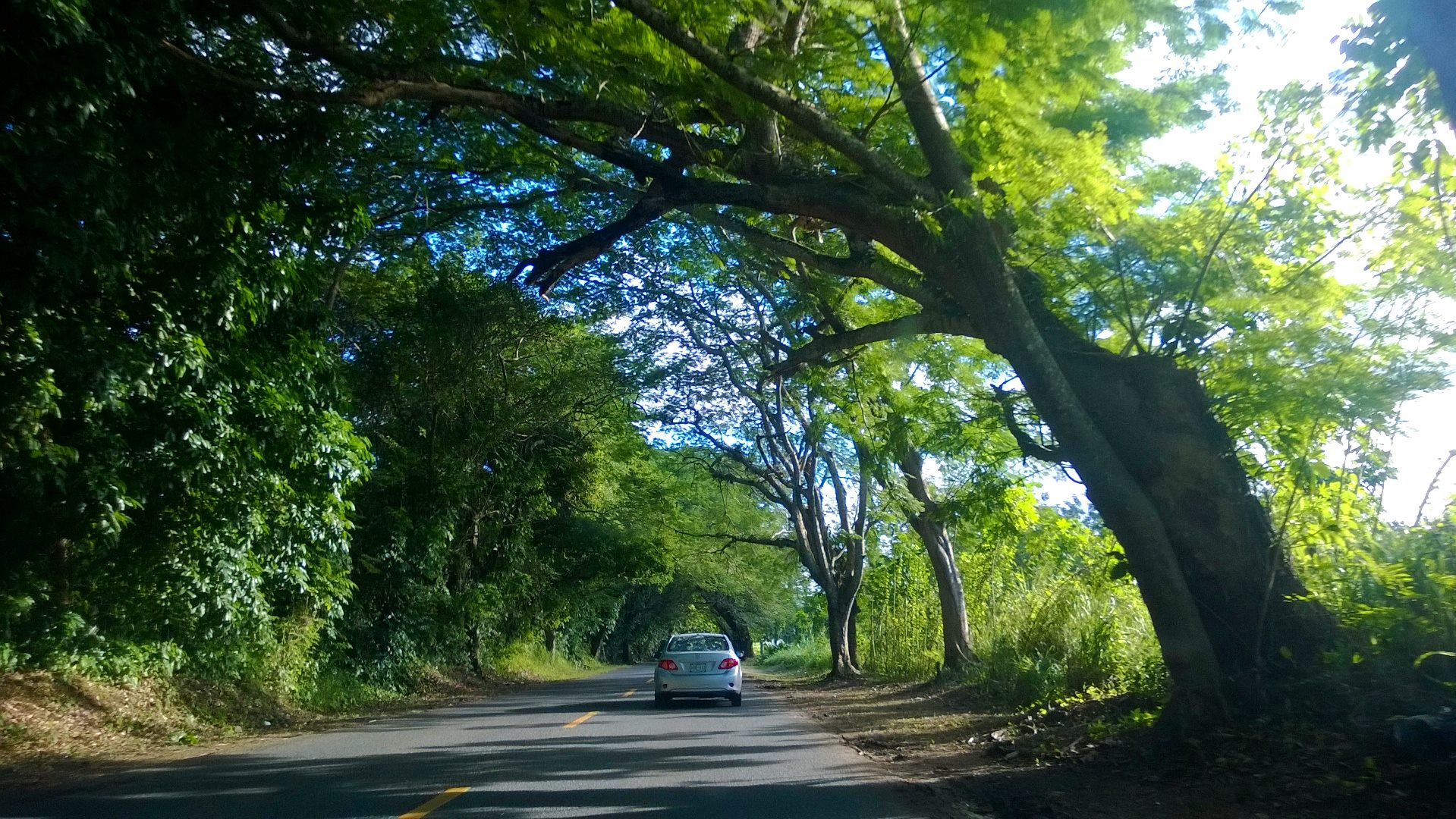
- Puerto Rico Highway 165 in Río Lajas

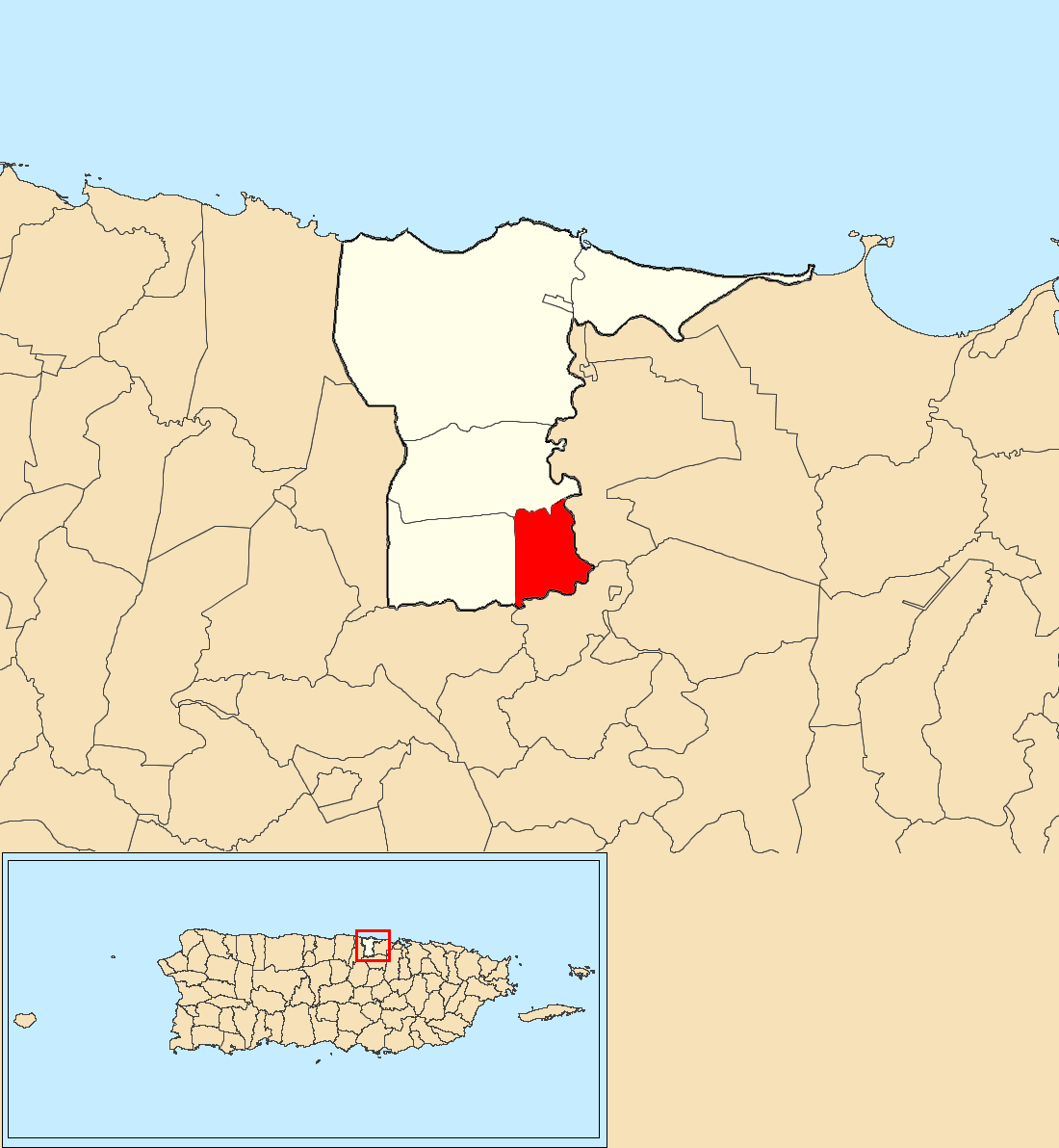
- Location of Río Lajas within the municipality of Dorado shown in red

- Location within the Caribbean
- Coordinates: 18°23′47″N 66°15′48″W
- Commonwealth: Puerto Rico
- Municipality: Dorado

Area
  - Total: 1.56 sq mi (4.0 km^{2})
  - Land: 1.55 sq mi (4.0 km^{2})
  - Water: 0.01 sq mi (0.026 km^{2})
- Elevation: 246 ft (75 m)

Population (2010)
  - Total: 2,559
  - Density: 1,651/sq mi (637/km^{2})
- Source: 2010 Census
- Time zone: UTC−4 (AST)
- ZIP Code: 00646

Río Lajas is a barrio in the municipality of Dorado, Puerto Rico. Its population in 2010 was 2,559.

== History ==
Río Lajas was in Spain's gazetteers until Puerto Rico was ceded by Spain in the aftermath of the Spanish–American War under the terms of the Treaty of Paris of 1898 and became an unincorporated territory of the United States. In 1899, the United States Department of War conducted a census of Puerto Rico finding that the population of Río Lajas barrio was 377.

Historical population
| Census | Pop. | Note | %± |
|---|---|---|---|
| 1900 | 377 | | — |
| 1910 | 592 | | 57.0% |
| 1920 | 613 | | 3.5% |
| 1930 | 796 | | 29.9% |
| 1940 | 1,004 | | 26.1% |
| 1950 | 934 | | −7.0% |
| 1960 | 1,108 | | 18.6% |
| 1970 | 1,716 | | 54.9% |
| 1980 | 2,193 | | 27.8% |
| 1990 | 2,548 | | 16.2% |
| 2000 | 2,573 | | 1.0% |
| 2010 | 2,559 | | −0.5% |
U.S. Decennial Census; 1899 (shown as 1900) 1910-1930; 1930-1950 1980-2000 2010

== Sectors ==
Barrios (which are, in contemporary times, roughly comparable to minor civil divisions) in turn are further subdivided into smaller local populated place areas/units called sectores (sectors in English). The types of sectores may vary, from normally sector to urbanización to reparto to barriada to residencial, among others.

The following sectors are in Río Lajas barrio:

Parcelas Viejas, Sector Alturas de Río Lajas, Sector El Rincón, Sector Las Corozas, Sector Villa Iriarte, and Urbanización Molinos del Río.

== Gallery ==
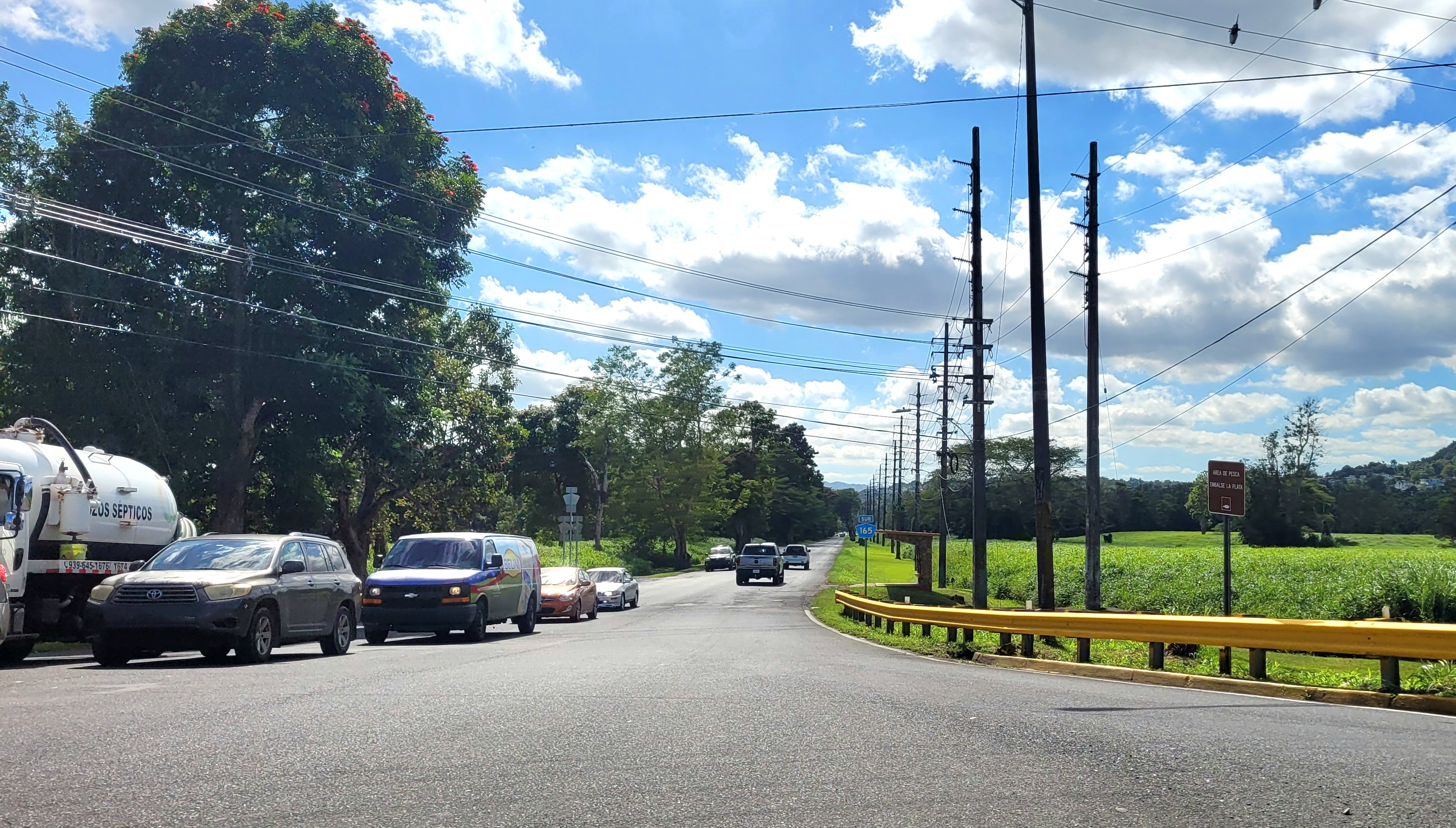
PR-165 heading to Río Lajas and Toa Alta

== See also ==
- List of communities in Puerto Rico
- List of barrios and sectors of Dorado, Puerto Rico
