= Dorado, Puerto Rico =

Town and municipality in Puerto Rico

Dorado Municipio Autónomo de Dorado
- Town and municipality
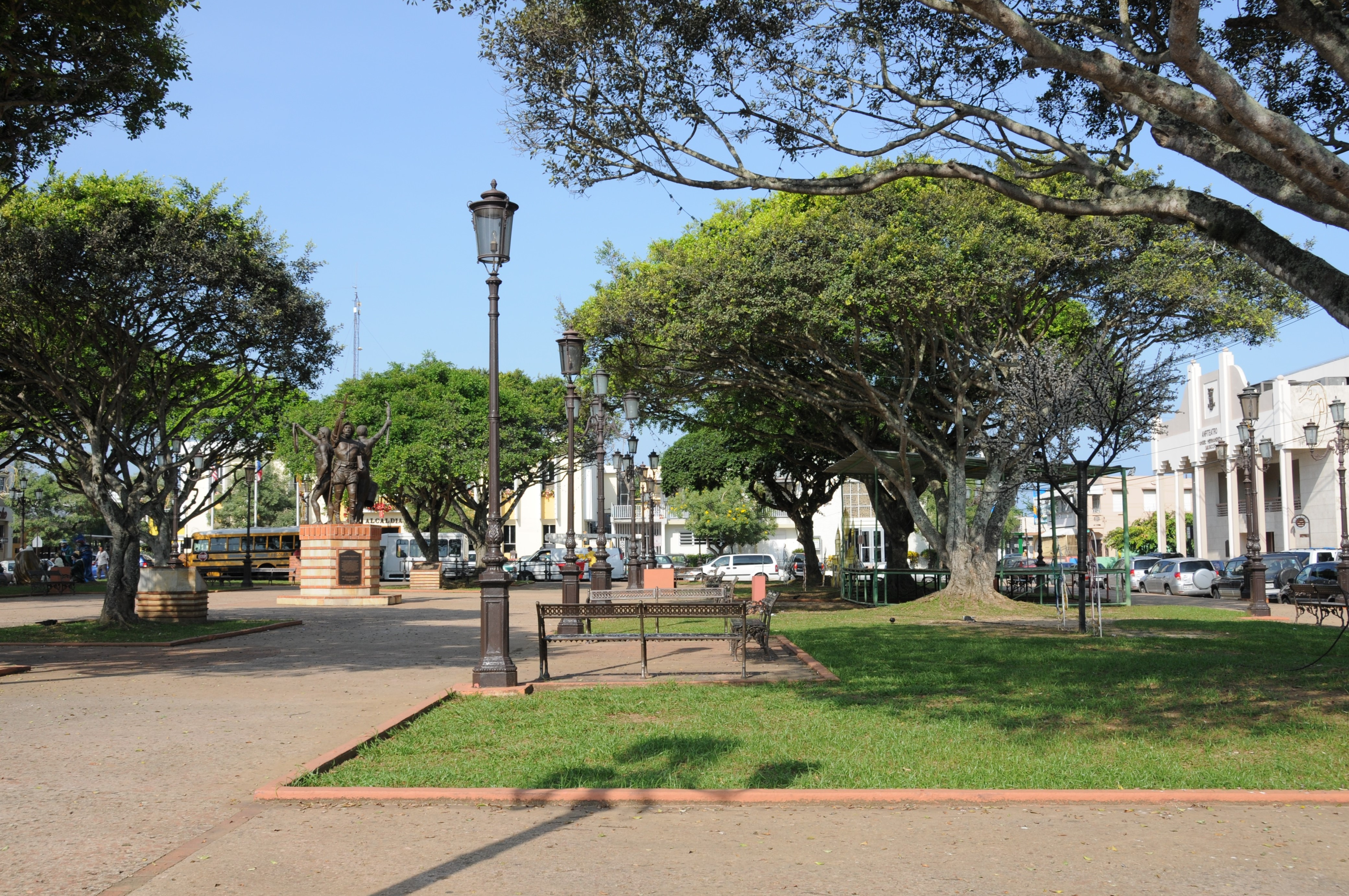
- Main square in Dorado

- Flag Coat of arms
- Nicknames: "La Ciudad Ejemplar", "Ciudad Dorada", "La Más Limpia de Puerto Rico"
- Anthem: "Por fin, en las riberas"
- Map of Puerto Rico highlighting Dorado Municipality
- Coordinates: 18°27′32″N 66°16′04″W
- Sovereign state: United States
- Commonwealth: Puerto Rico
- Settled: late 16th century
- Founded: May 13, 1842
- Founder: Jacinto López Martínez
- Barrios: 6: Dorado barrio-pueblo; Espinosa; Higuillar; Maguayo; Mameyal; Rio Lajas

Government
  - Mayor: Aníbal José Torres (PPD)
  - Senatorial dist.: 3 – Arecibo
  - Representative dist.: 11

Area
  - Total: 23.23 sq mi (60.16 km^{2})

Population (2020)
  - Total: 35,879
  - Estimate (2025): 35,891 ▲
  - Rank: 31st in Puerto Rico
  - Density: 1,545/sq mi (596.4/km^{2})
  - Racial groups (2020 Census): 17.6% White Puerto Ricans; 7.5% Afro-Puerto Ricans; 0.4% American Indian/AN; 0.3% Asian; 0.0% Native Hawaiian/PI; 25.8% other 48.5% two or more races
- Demonym: Doradeños
- Time zone: UTC−4 (AST)
- ZIP Code: 00646
- Area code: 787/939
- Website: www.legislaturadorado.com

Dorado (Spanish pronunciation: [doˈɾaðo]) is a town and municipality on the northern coast of Puerto Rico, 15 miles (24 km) west of San Juan and is located in the northern region of the island, bordering the Atlantic Ocean, north of Toa Alta, east of Vega Alta, and west of Toa Baja. Dorado is subdivided into five barrios and Dorado Pueblo (the downtown area and the administrative center of the city). It is part of the San Juan–Bayamón–Caguas metropolitan area.

During the early 18th century, there were already mentions of a "Sitio de Dorado" in some San Juan registers. Since the beginning of the Spanish colonial period and until 1831, Dorado existed as a barrio (a type of sub-municipal ward) of the municipality of Toa Baja. Over several years, the ward grew and established its own town center called the "new town" (pueblo nuevo) to differentiate itself from Toa Baja, which became known as the "old town" (pueblo viejo). Over several years, the barrios that currently make up Dorado grew and the people of the pueblo nuevo wanted to separate themselves from Toa Baja. On November 22, 1842, Jacinto López Martínez, the Sergeant at Arms for the ward of Dorado, petitioned the Spanish Governor of Puerto Rico, Santiago Méndez Vigo, to establish the municipality of Dorado. The governor authorized the founding of the town pending the construction of public works, including an administrative building and a church near the town square. In 1848, the construction of the public works were completed and López Martínez became the first mayor of Dorado. Puerto Rico was ceded by Spain in the aftermath of the Spanish–American War under the terms of the Treaty of Paris of 1898 and became a territory of the United States. In 1902, four years after the Spanish–American War, Dorado was again appended to Toa Baja. But in 1905 it regained its status as a separate town. Nowadays, Dorado has upscale neighborhoods and a small downtown area with a plaza (main town square), as other Puerto Rican municipalities. The town's patron saint is Anthony of Padua, and patron saint celebrations are held at the plaza every year on June 13.

== History ==
=== Pre-Columbian period and colonization ===
The region adjacent to the Toa River (now called the La Plata River) was inhabited by several indigenous groups who left behind physical proof of their presence in the region. The area surrounding the Toa river was scouted by Juan Ponce de León during his initial reconnaissance of the geography of the main island. Near the river, the conquistadores built some huts in which to rest. However, citing "difficulties" with the region, the Spaniards opted to move to the region that would eventually become Caparra, the colonial Spanish capital of San Juan Bautista (the original Spanish name for Puerto Rico). During the beginning of the Spanish colonization, the area known as Toa was ruled by Taíno cacique Aramaná, who controlled the regions between Punta Salinas to the Cibuco River (modern day Toa Baja through Vega Baja). After Agüeybana I entered into association with the Spanish conquistadors through the guaytiao, Aramaná became known as Francisco de Aramaná, also being recognized as a Don. Now technically as politically influential as Agüeybana due to the ceremony, the Spanish were able to include the lower ranking caciques, including Aramaná, in the encomiendas system and placed several in charge of royal farms and mining operations near Toa River. The region proved production both in agriculture and mining and an assimilation process began between both cultures. Ponce de León himself created Hacienda del Rey and requested the creation of a new conuco near Toa River, which was later sold to Pedro Ortiz. The conquistador also built other properties that he later sold to other Spaniards. Around 500 Taínos worked under the caciques in the area.

Oral tradition claims that a Spaniard named Juan González somehow survived long enough after being severely injured in the initial Taíno offensive of the Spanish–Taíno War of San Juan–Borikén to reach the region of Toa and warn the conquistadores. Ten years after the beginning of the colonization, more than 17 estates were built in the region, with harvests being transported through the Toa River to Palo Seco and to the capital from there. After Ponce de León transferred Hacienda del Rey to other Spaniards, the estate steadily declined and by 1524, denunciations were made about its state. As more Spanish families settled, problems between neighbors arose, prompting Francisco de Negrete to request in 1611 that a mayor should be assigned to the region. However, it is not until 1731 that a mayor, Juan Dávila, appears in the records. During the following decades, more than 24 mayors would serve office, with military officers becoming prominent beginning in the 1740s.

=== Existence as part of Toa Baja ===
On September 11, 1627, San Juan's council ordered the creation of a ship route between Bayamón and Toa, giving control of the rent to the council of the first city. From here, the rest of the route was traversed on horseback. On the way from the capital to the central north coast, two passages were encountered, the Palo Seco and the Boca Hababa river. After crossing the second, a rest area was built in modern-day barrio Mameyal. With an increase in traffic, the inhabitants of the town of Toa saw business opportunities and began joining the local fishermen, steadily creating a small settlement. By the first half of the 18th century, the locale was already known as "Dorado", "Boca del Dorado" or "Alto del Dorado" and referred to as such in official documentation. The municipality of Toa Baja was founded around 1745. Other sources place the foundation as taking place in 1747. With this development, the region became part of it. The Santa Hermandad mayor then became the municipal mayor. By 1748, the Settler Captain was George García Páes. In February 1761, there was a conflict between the overseer of the Boca Havana passage, Cayetano Quiñones, and the local fishermen in which the location became relevant. The control and lent of these passages remained in contention during the following century, with the San Juan council refereeing similar issues.

Towards the 18th century's end and entering the 19th century, the municipality had become a hub for sugar plantations led by Spanish hacendados and slavers, who exploited an international need for sugar caused by the Haitian revolution to export it and derivatives like rum while also meeting local demands. Other crops were also grown, but no priority was given to them. The end of the Napoleonic Wars and the elimination of some taxes allowed a new generation of hacendados from the capital of San Juan to benefit from the booming industry, among the mayors Jacinto López Martínez and José Canales. However, the roads that led to western Puerto Rico crossed through El Dorado and this, combined with flooding concerns, did not allow the municipality to develop a proper urban center, with Palo Seco being its main commerce epicenter. By 1820, Dorado itself was as big as the municipal town and the crisis lead to a proposal of relocating the municipal town there being presented to colonial governor Miguel de la Torre by hacendados with ties to him during a visit. On October 20, 1824, the move was authorized, but it stalled due to opposition from the settlers. However, this same year a hurricane named Santa Ana ravaged and flooded the municipal town, causing the death of people and cattle, accelerating the process. In the following years, the construction of a royal house and a church began at Dorado. During this time, Toa Baja's mayor, José María Ramírez de Arellano, requested a move of the boat access point near the entry of Dorado to a more accessible location, avoiding a dangerous body of waters in the process, a request which was later conceded by the council of San Juan. However, the free transit to Dorado for the neighbors of the municipal town of Toa Baja was attended afterwards, despite being part of the initial request. By 1829, the local militias and the justice offices were relocated as well. However, entering the following decades, the opponents of the move led by mayor José Manuel de Córdova forced the return of the municipal institutions and returned them to Toa Baja, claiming lack of proper maintenance. Despite this, Dorado continued growing as the traffic of people traversing through the royal road rose. By 1832, a teacher named José Viada was teaching the local children. The settlement eventually earned the name of Pueblo Nuevo to differentiate it from Toa Baja (Pueblo Viejo).

=== Secession disputes with Toa Baja ===
With the plantations led by administrators, the flourish of the sugar industry continued until 1840, when the market entered in a crisis and the price of products crashed, leaving the region with a declining industry. In 1839, Palo Seco opted to become a separate municipality. On March 10, 1841, colonial governor Santiago de Méndez Vigo authorized moving all the administrative offices from Dorado to Toa Baja, faced by pressure from the settlers. Consequently, former mayor and hacendado Jacinto López Martínez, who had employed his friendship with de la Torre to acquire local terrains between 1813 and 1835, proposed creating a separate municipality by the name of El Dorado to secure his wealth by acquiring the title of Settlement Captain. In a reunion with friends and family, he formalized this request. The justification was based in the population growth in Dorado and adjacent barrios and possessing enough resources to sustain itself separately. In arrangements that took place on July 27, 1841, in San Juan, López was joined by José de Folgueras as prospective beneficiaries if the move and his proposal was supported by Manuel Canales, Celedonio Nevárez, Juan P. Nevárez, Domingo López, Andrés Martínez, Florencio Sánchez, José M. López, Ignacio Arrazaín and Ignacio Cordero, who offered to build the buildings necessary to sustain the town. The official request took place shortly afterwards, with the governor requesting feedback from the municipality of Toa Baja after being counseled to do so. After more than a month, the reply contained strong opposition to the separation, heavily criticizing the capacities of those involved in the request citing personal ambitions as a motive and claiming that the lands were unproductive, that the area was plagued with environmental factors that "resulted in the early death" of its residents and that the water was unclean. The rebuttal also claimed that the barrios pushing for separation were unable too poor to sustain the public workings of a town, despite being the ones that contributed most to the fisco up to this point, the purported lack of personnel and a workforce or that the proximity of the settlements would be unlawful. After being given copies of Toa Baja's opposition, López and Folgueras requested that the complaints were dismissed and questioned the accuracy of any of the counterarguments, also opting to criticize that some of the proponents were being targeted for being poor, which should not prevent them from entering association. The group also labelled Toa Baja as a failed municipality by using its own criteria, responding that the criticism for lack of a workforce was unfair since despite its age the town faced similar problems.

Public hearings were then proposed and accepted by the colonial governor. The process was assigned to Commander Miguel Delgado, who left to Toa Baja accompanied by witnesses Plácido de Cabrera and Juan M. Feijó. The following day, March 10, 1842, the preliminary preparations began. Only 14 of the 120 available testified in the hearings, which were interviewed about their residence in Dorado and expressed favor for the creation of a municipality. (Note: According to Canino, they were "José de Folgueras, Jacinto López, Lorenzo de Cabrera, Ceferino de Cabrera, Manuel de Cabrera, Pablo Marrero, Máximino Báez, Miguel Toro, Fernando Ferrer, Francisco Igaravídez, Ramón Roses, José Nevárez, Agustín Otero, Manuel Joaquín de Navedo and Francisco Javier Marrero.") Delgado also supervised the status of progression in the construction of a town church. On March 13, 1842, a process to interview the opponents at Toa Baja, who had since stepped our from authority, began and extended for three days. Afterwards, Delgado returned to San Juan with a report for the governor favoring the establishment of a new municipality due to favorable conditions and military potential and discarding proximity as a factor, since the municipalities of Camuy and Hatillo, already founded, were equally proximate to each other. Méndez Vigo delegated the issue to an aid, Anacleto Buelta, who suggested interviewing the current Toa Baja administration and argued inconsistencies in witness selection. Delgado died suddenly shortly afterwards. Buelta then recommended beginning a new process again in Toa Baja, which the colonial governor conceded and assigned the task to councilor Domingo García. On May 28, 1842, he left the capital accompanied by witnesses Plácido de Cabrera and Eusebio de Cabrera. The second set of hearings began on June 1, 1842, in the town hall of Toa Baja, which assigned a commission to oversee the process, with several of the previous deponents ratifying their previous statements and 23 inhabitants of Dorado supporting the request for separation, with the remainder being forced to attend subsequent hearings by the local court. All ratified their previous support except five, who felt that they would be forced to work in the church, a job that they had left at Toa Baja. The only exceptions, according to the rural mayors of Dorado and Maguayo, were either sick or absent. The Toa Baja Commission, represented by mayor Juan Landrón an overseer and the municipal secretary, proposed that only proprietors, those that paid subsidies, should be consulted, considering the declarations of those that didn't useless and potentially damaging to those that did. The municipal government also opposed the declarations of no -resident proponents, those that weren't family heads or that had any connection with the main proponents, accompanied by a list of people that they considered ineligible.

=== Founding of Dorado ===
On June 4, 1842, Landrón submitted a list of people that were considered eligible by his administration, including residents from barrios that were not initially interested in the action. This same day, opposition hearings were held where the administration if Toa Baja presented its case, with López and Folgueras serving as witnesses. A total of 91 residents from these barrios attended, with the opinions regarding the foundation of Dorado being in favor of the opposition 125–8, without counting a number of indifferent attendees. Hearing concluded on June 9, 1842, with a relevant report being completed the same day. Like the first, it was delegated to an aide. Two days later, López addressed the colonial governor requesting a copy of the aide's conclusion, citing the suspicion that the municipality of Toa Baja had used ineligible witnesses to dilate the process. Shortly afterwards, López impugned the declarations of opposing witnesses, noting that most did not live near the proposed municipality and that others simply wanted to avoid paying more to the government, requesting statistics of paying inhabitants of Dorado with which to argue that they were capable of sustaining a new town. On August 12, 1842, the proponents sent a recount of the process and requested that the colonial governor authorized the founding of Dorado, printing the aid to request the opinion of the Toa Baja administration. On September 8, 1842, the municipal government once again opposed the separation. After receiving it, aide Melitón Belanzathegui recommended proceeding with the foundation of a new municipality, with Méndez Vigo authorizing the creation of San Antonio del Dorado on November 22, 1842. The government made demands guaranteeing the construction of several building, towards which López placed his own properties as collateral. The founders also requested to begin the process to assign or elect relevant authority figures, all of which were granted. The colonial governor also named López Settler Captain and ordered that all buildings were completed within a year and a half. The demarcation process was initially overseen by Pedro García with the help of Julio O'Neill of the Bayamón department with Carlos Vuagneaux taking charge following a suspención due to weather, and began on January 10, 1843, extending for six days. The cost of establishing the new municipality ascended 4,196 pesos with 20 cents. Despite the founding of a number of schools, the education in the new municipality was troubled by the instability in the permanency of teachers appointed by the Roman Catholic Church.

During this time, there were around 17 higher class residences in the municipality, while the working class lived in wooden huts. Depending on an agricultural economy, there were several hundred African slaves working in the Spanish haciendas of Dorado. On March 6, 1843, there was a slave uprising in the hacienda of Francisco Cantero, who after being received by gunfire in the town church of Toa Baja, fled to the sugar plantations of Dorado, where the government captured them and sentenced several to death. Despite royal decrees prohibiting the traffic of African slaves, the Spaniards continued illegally importing them, with Dorado mayor José Carreras actively participating in the trade. However, the salve population was severely hit by a cholera epidemic, and two years later the colonial government confiscated a ship property of Carreras was confiscated due to its suspected links with the activity. Consternation in the colonial authorities lead to the slaves being permitted to file complaints before the Municipal Sindico Receiver. A predominantly Catholic culture also brought another phenomenon, in which repentant slave owners set them free as part if their last will. Other work sources, like corral fishing, required permission first from the council of San Juan and later from the municipal administration.

By 1848, the municipality of Dorado was running all of its functions under López, now mayor and War Lieutenant and in charge of filling several reports related to the population, wealth and agricultural production. Afterwards, the mayor would be elected by the governor from a pool of three candidates selected by the municipality's elite and only served a maximum of two years. During this time, the economy was dependent on 9 sugar haciendas and 54 cattle estates. The industry in question was dominated by López himself, Manuel Skerrett, Francisco Cantero, José Marrero, Carlos Vassallo, Miguel Torrens, Juan P. Nevárez, Florencio Salgado, and the inheritors of María E. Martínez. Being located in the Camino Real (Royal Highway) grocery and other types of stores were run by people like Antonio Solé, Benito Carreras, and Juana Sánchez and brothers. These types of businesses continued flourishing for the following decades. By 1859, there were 179 farms in Dorado. López, Salgado and others also created brick and lime powder factories. At the First Public Exposition of Industry, Agriculture and Arts, Lechet demonstrated his advances in processing white sugar, which earned him a silver commendation from the Secretary of the Royal Commerce Board, Andrés Viña. In the third edition of this event, a Dorado factory won the gold award for a variety if products.

=== Abolition of slavery and Spanish–American War ===
On March 19, 1850, the municipality was reclassified as a Second-class Mayorship. On August 4, 1860, Toa Baja mayor Manuel Aguayo proposed the merger of Dorado into Toa Baja, which was opposed by Dorado mayor Pablo A. Dueño and his administration. A month later the proposal was dropped by the colonial governor. Upon his death in 1862, López himself left money for his slaves. His inheritors failed to preserve the terrains that were received from him. In 1870, a group of four slaves -named Manuel Díaz, Juan Pedro, Juan D. Epifanio and Benito- killed the butler of Hacienda La Monserrate, Manuel M. Sampayo Saldaña, who had developed a reputation for the eating the violently. For this act, the colonial government executed them on September 26, 1870. The event would become part of Dorado's oral tradition. Despite drop in the local price of slaves, some residents of Cuba would buy slaves and export them to that island where the price was rising. In 1872, an incident involving a Frenchman named José Beaupied lead to the slaver being intervened and losing the four children of a slave that he had bought, but she was transferred to Dorado and with the help of a fellow Frenchman and later committed suicide. The event was controversial and lead to the local British ambassador, H. August Cowper, protesting the moving if slaves between the islands before the Spanish crown. Telegraph lines were placed in 1870, connecting Dorado to several municipalities and remaining in service for more than a century.

As abolition became impending, several entities including Sucesión de Torrens, Sobrinos de Arrazaín and Skerret y Hermanos joined individuals such as Ambrosio Martorell and released their slaves pro bono. For thus action, they were commended by the Spanish Crown on April 26, 1873. In total, the abolition granted freedom to 402 slaves in Dorado. Oral tradition claims that the freed celebrated until midnight, when a thunderstorm suddenly appeared and during which the tomb of Sampayo was struck by lightning. A series of earthquakes in late 1867 damaged buildings in Dorado, particularly the town church. In 1872, local instruction was placed in charge of José Iglesias and six years later the situation began improving. In 1884, José D. Félix and Pedro M. Agüeeo founded private schools, which attended an interest of the higher classes to educate their children. Entering the next decade, there were six public schools and several hundred children being educated. However, the elementary system was troubled, with only two schools classified as Second Class by the government. By this time there were more than 200 houses in the urban area of Dorado and over 270 families.

Dorado remained a poor municipality throughout the 19th century and the 1873 agricultural crisis exacerbated its issues to the point that towards 1897 was unable to pay debts that had been accumulating for nearly 30 years. During this crisis, several of the hacendados were forced to mortgage their haciendas, incurring in large debts that lead to some losing them. On July 20, 1870, the annexation to Toa Baja was proposed by conservatives, but failed to proceed. Early during this decade, there were seven businesses that paid subsidies, while during the second half there were some 14 businesses. On June 10, 1873, the municipality of Dorado requested permission to widen and deepen the La Plata River mouth to allow larger ships to enter in an attempt to reinvigorate the sugar industry. However, a prolonged draught seriously affected the crops and combined with the payment that was now given to former slaves, the situation quickly declined.

Jacinto López II became mayor in 1875, holding the office until the year of his death nine years later, but despite this influence debt made him lose the terrains that once belonged to his father to the colonial government. The budgets were not satisfactory, but Dorado received the control of the passage of La Plata, which it rented. However, the passage soon became a point of contention between those that wanted to oversee it and the municipality, including a failed 1878 litigation presented to the colonial governor himself during a visit. By this year, there were only seven steam powered sugar mills working in the municipality.

On March 8, 1891, the train track connecting Dorado to Manatí and Martín Peña were inaugurated. The passenger train would operate until the 1940s. A sales tax was imposed to try and counter the crisis in 1895, but within a year the abolition of Dorado as a municipality was considered. The final decade of the century borough forth a sugar renaissance, growing to 11 haciendas which were complemented by a coffee estate. By 1893, there were 229 farms, with seven totaling more than half of the terrains with Pablo Ubarri being the dominant owner. As consequence of the Spanish–American War, Dorado was placed under the control of the colonial American government on October 11, 1898.

=== American military administration ===
Puerto Rico was ceded by Spain in the aftermath of the Spanish–American War under the terms of the Treaty of Paris of 1898 and became a territory of the United States. In 1899, the United States conducted its first census of Puerto Rico finding that the population of Dorado was 3,804.

This change in sovereignty resulted in several of the local haciendas being systematically redistributed between Americans such as R.S. Brown, William W. Miner and corporations like Y.P.R. Fruit Land Co. and Finlay Waymouth and Lee, Inc. during the following decade. Ubarri's terrains were fragmented and part of it ended being owned by Afred Livingston and his daughter Clara. The town clergy house was seized by the colonial government and in 1922 the municipality turned it into an emergency building.

Elections for municipal offices began being held on January 16, 1900. The results were certified by representative of the colonial government, Lt. Woodson Hocker. By 1902, there were six schools in Dorado. These institutions would later be staffed by Doradeños that graduated from the University of Puerto Rico, completed by other locals. With time, some families would dedicate to instruction. By the second decade of the century, the Jacinto Lopez Martinez Grammar School and the Segunda Unidad de Maguayo school were built to accommodate the increasing school age population, with the first being created at the behest of mayor Heraclio López Canino.

Alfredo López would take the office of mayor from his father and begin a series of urban development projects. The following two decades, Pedro López Canino and two rural schools were built. Near it, the Escuela Ricardo Arroyo Laracuente served as middle school. In 1952, Manuel Morales García was elected as mayor. In 1964, a local high school was built so that local children did not have to travel to Toa Baja, the following decade it was renamed after local attorney José S. Alegría.

Pedro López Canino served as mayor taking over the municipal administration when Dorado's budget was merely $3,000, with this sum ascending to $18,000 by the 1920s. The first telephone lines were placed in 1910 and operators were employed until the 1960s. That same year, the Puerto Rico Power and Light Co. installed electrical lines.

New stores were founded early in this century, including El Siglo XX and Salgado y Pérez, both of which ceased to exist during the first half of the century. The first gas station in Dorado was founded by Ramón Pérez, who also created the Dorada Bus Line. Milk and ice were also distributed. Maritime and fresh water fishers were responsible for providing fresh fish and several would later become part of Dorado's oral tradition. During the 1950s, the Dorado Fishing Club introduced sport fishing to the municipality.

Ultimately, Dorado was annexed to Toa Alta in 1902, when the Puerto Rico legislature ordered the move due to its economic woes. In March 1905, the same entity reversed the move. By 1920, 177 farms remained, with a sharp decline in mid-sized and small properties. Three years after the death of Alfred Livingston in 1923, the government reclaimed Mata Redonda farm since it had been acquired illegally, but after being repelled with armed resistance during the impending, the case was seen by the colonial Federal Court, which failed in favor of Clara Livingston. With the foreign interests, cultivation of sugar rose and reached 400 square meters (a unit known in Spanish as "cuerda") of land, but coffee stopped being produced. Other fruits began increasing production during the 1940s. Most of the population was dependent on the opportunities offered by the agricultural entities, which lead to a pronounced unemployment rate. To counter this, the worker's union donated the building where the Dorado Hand Craft factory was established, operating for two decades. New aqueducts and a sewer system replaced a well based system during 1948–50. In 1936, a new bridge crossing La Plata River was inaugurated.

During the 1940s, there was widespread construction of public and private housing to accommodate a series of government reforms. Among these was El Pueblo del Niño, a refuge for children. In 1947, the municipal assembly adopted the official map of Dorado that was proposed with the barrios of Higuillar, Maguayo, Espinosa, Mameyal and Río Lajas.

=== Commonwealth ===
In 1953, a widespread fire destroyed 11 houses, with its residents being relocated to new homes provided by charity. This precipitated the creation of a local fire station in 1956. The end of the Korean War lead to another urbanization wave. The construction of private project Urbanización Martorell resulted in several Doradeños returning to settle the houses. This tendency continued during the following three decades, with middle and high class projects being built. In 1957, a road was built between Dorado and Palo Seco.

By the mid-20th century, Dorado continued producing sugar, fruits and cattle, but there was a continued decline in the presence of small and mid-sized properties. However, by this time Finlay Waymouth and Lee, Inc. disappeared. Wealthy families, both local and American, continued acquiring the terrains of Dorado. During the 1950s, an economic shift lead to the virtual disappearance of the sugar industry and the terrains were repurposed for cattle. Clara Livingston sold her terrains to the Rockefeller family, who turned them into two hotels, Dorado Beach and Cerromar. Late in the decade, Dorado created a municipal library, located in the old emergency building (previously the town parish house).

Stores such as La Vencedora and La Favorita were founded during this time, operating during the following decades. In 1972, Alfonso López Chaar was elected mayor with a platform based on sports and culture. Dorado became the first municipality to adopt the landfill system. The 2nd G7 summit was held at the Dorado Beach Resort between June 27 and 28, 1976.

Casa del Rey, which after being acquired from the government by López had served as the house of several people and a political center, was restored by the municipality and the Institute of Puerto Rican Culture (ICP) during the second half of the 20th century. In 1985, the municipal administration began a restoration and redevelopment project named Dorado 2000 prior to the celebration of Dorado's 150th Anniversary. When Alfonso López Chaar left the office of mayor to become Secretary of State in 1987, his successor Carlos López became the youngest mayor in Puerto Rico at that point at the age of 29. In 1988 the Committee on the Quality of Life of a Puerto Rico recognized the municipality as first in their life quality rankings. The municipality revalidated and was included into the entity's hall of fame. In 1989, Hurricane Hugo made landfall in Puerto Rico and caused heavy damages to the municipality. By the 1990s, Dorado del Mar had closed, with Cerromar and Dorado Beach continuing their function. In 1991, a reforestation initiative named Dorado Siembra was implanted. That same year the ICP named the town's cultural program a "cultural model".

On January 6, 1992, floods destroyed the La Plata bridge. That same year, the administration of Dorado held concurrent Fifth Centenary and municipal anniversary events. The Dorado Airport was operated from 1942 to 1996. The airport began as a military landing strip, then became a civilian airport in the 1960s with Caribair and Dorado Wings flights operating until 1980 and 1982 respectively. The airport operated as a private landing strip throughout the 1980s and then fell into disrepair. In 1996, the airport was rezoned as residential land and redeveloped.

On September 20, 2017 Hurricane Maria struck the island of Puerto Rico. In Dorado, 1,175 homes were left without a roof and 625 homes were destroyed.

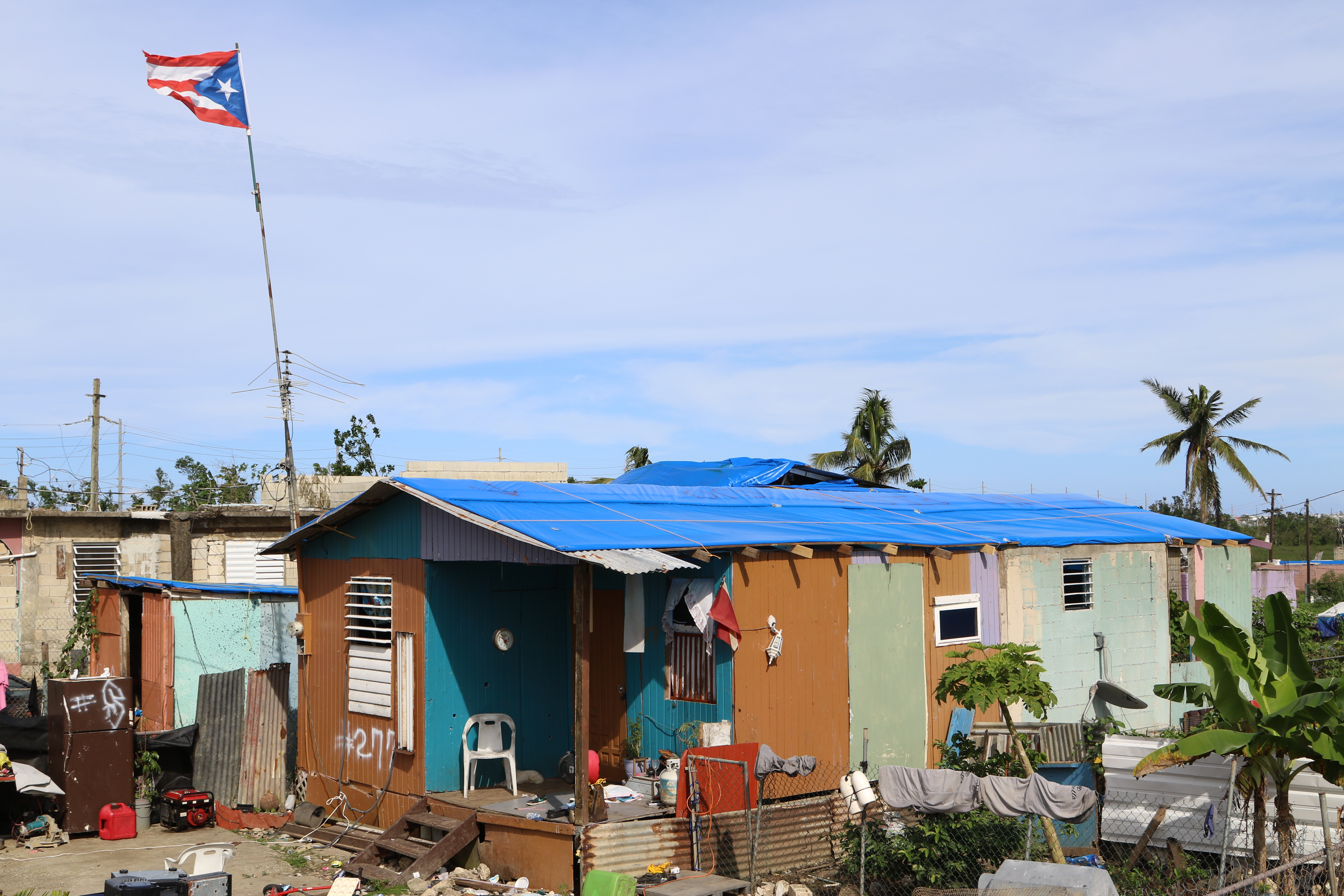
House with blue tarp after Hurricane Maria in Dorado, Puerto Rico

In mid 2018, the United States Army Corps of Engineers announced it would be undertaking a major flood control project of a river that often causes flooding in Dorado, Río de la Plata.

=== Act 60 ===
In 2012, the Luis Fortuño administration passes broad tax incentives for foreigners through Acts 20 and 22 (later consolidated into Act 60–2019), which included 0% on capital gains and a 4% corporate rate. Some areas became favored by the individuals that arrived to Puerto Rico to benefit, including Dorado Beach where mansions and villas sold in the 20–30 million range. The price of property in Dorado rose 66% between 2016 and 2019. With the turn of the decade more foreigners have moved to Dorado Beach, including Kevin Thobias and Logan Paul.

== Geography ==
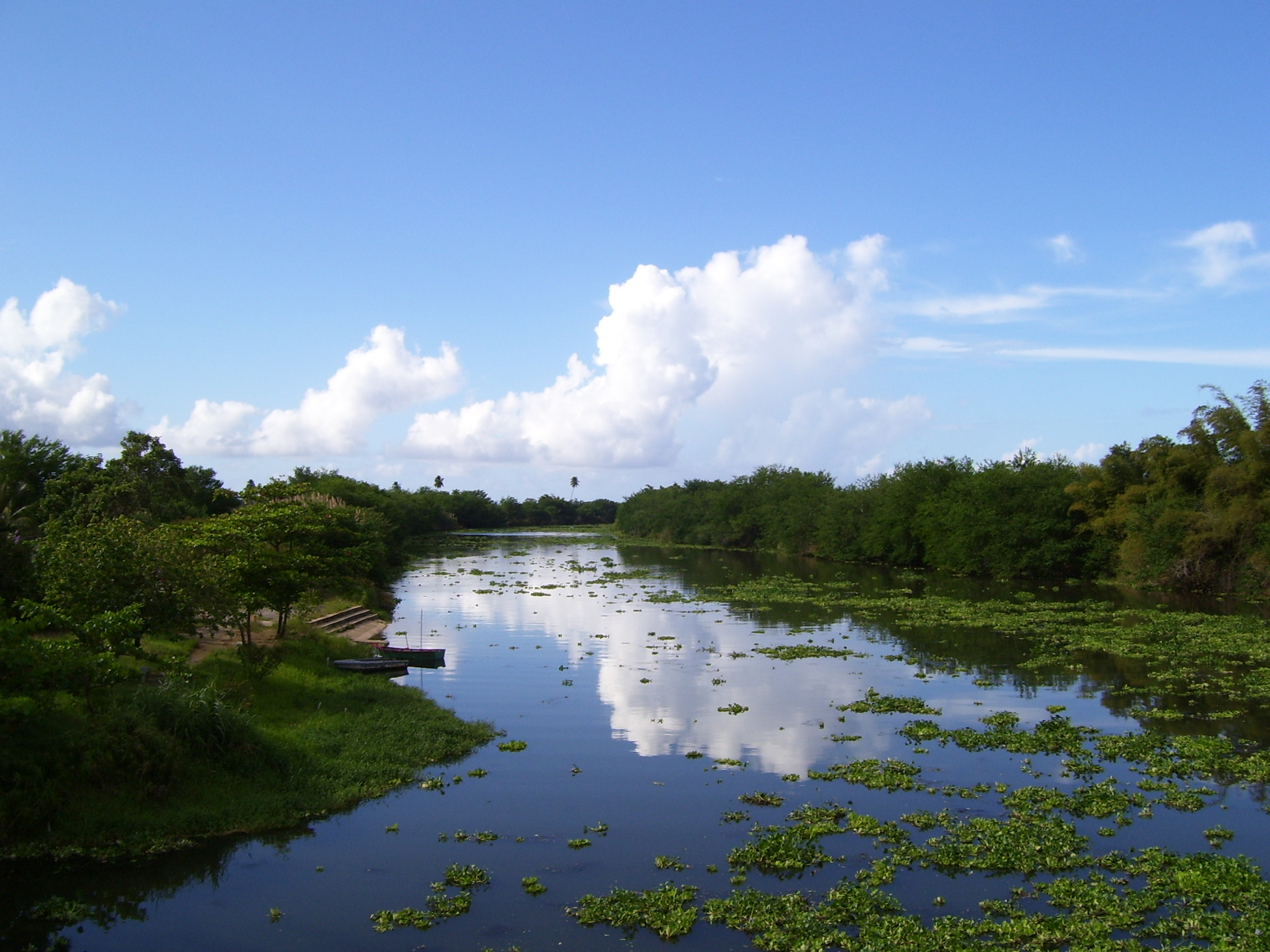
La Plata River in 2007

Dorado is located in Puerto Rico's Northern Karst region. Much of its geology consists of alluvial and coastal/estuarine sediments of Quaternary age and limestones of Tertiary age. The limestones are mostly in the south part of the municipality, in Espinosa, Maguayo and Rio Lajas barrios. These limestones exhibit mature karst topography of great beauty. It has been subjected to extensive quarrying, which have left unsightly scars in the landscape. Some local communities have gathered efforts to minimize quarrying and improve land management to protect the remaining karst topography and the fauna and flora that lives in it. Around 95% of Dorado's terrain are flood plains while the rest is part of a limestone region. The terrains are naturally fertilized when the Dorado, Plata and Lajas rivers go out of their limits. The rock formation known as Ojo de Buey is tourist attraction, also being associated with legends of ghosts and the claim that the pirate captain Roberto Cofresí's treasure is buried near it.

=== Hydrography ===
Some of the rivers of Dorado are:

- Rivers: Río Cocal, Río Lajas, Río de la Plata, and Río Nuevo.
- Mata Redonda Lagoon
- Punta Fraile marsh

=== Barrios ===
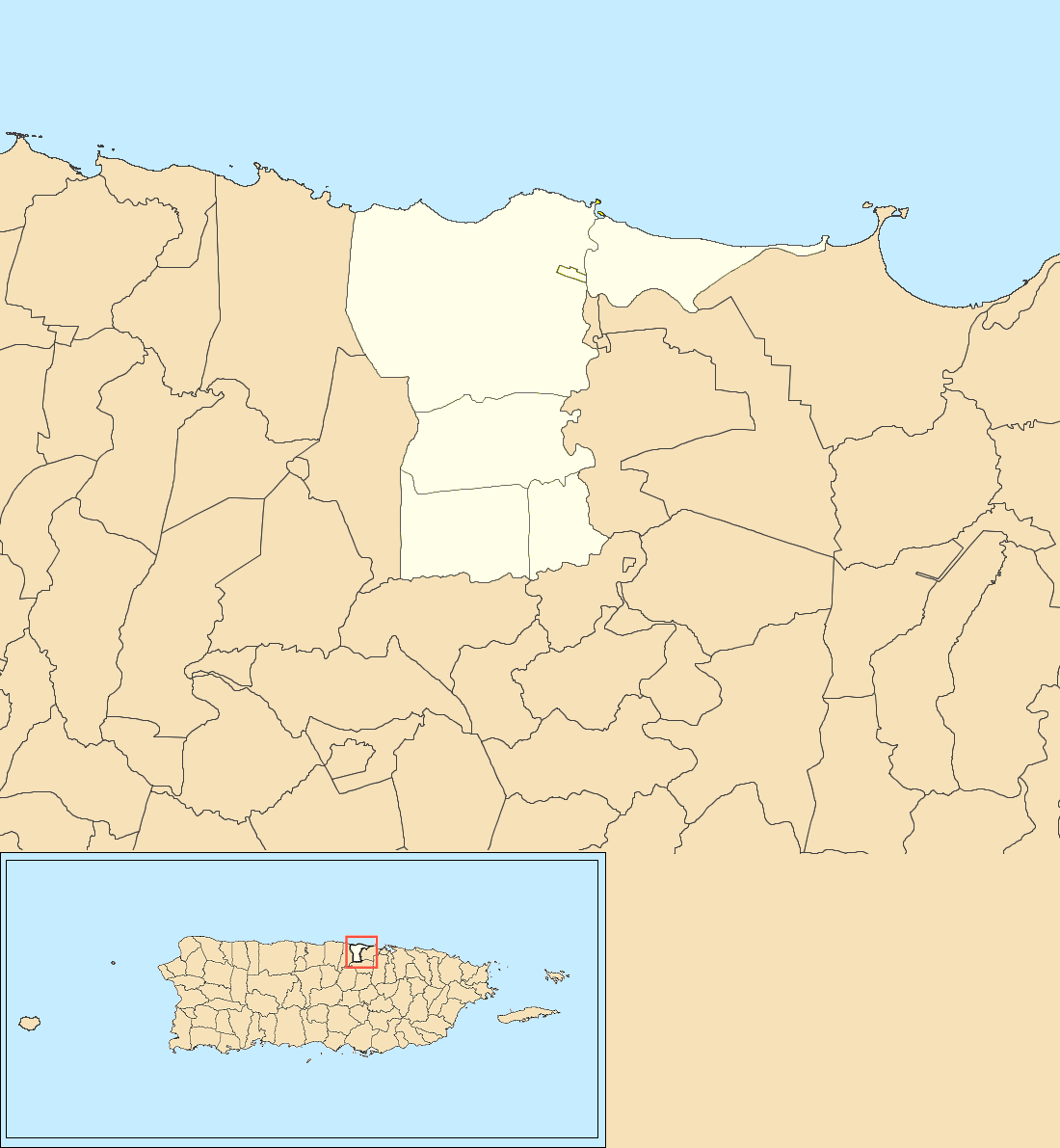
Subdivisions of Dorado.

Like all municipalities of Puerto Rico, Dorado is subdivided into barrios. The municipal buildings, central square and large Catholic church are located in a barrio referred to as "el pueblo".

1. Dorado barrio-pueblo
2. Espinosa
3. Higuillar
4. Maguayo
5. Mameyal
6. Río Lajas

Some of the municipality's barrios are named after the name of its inhabitants or taíno names, even the region itself may have been taken from the last name of an early Spanish settler. Examples of this are Espinosa and Maguayo Others such as Higuilar, Mameyal, Marismillas and Río Lajas are named after flora or geographical features.

=== Sectors ===
Barrios (which are like minor civil divisions) are further subdivided into smaller areas called sectores (sectors in English). The types of sectores may vary, from normally sector to urbanización to reparto to barriada to residencial, among others.

=== Special Communities ===
Comunidades Especiales de Puerto Rico (Special Communities of Puerto Rico) are marginalized communities whose citizens are experiencing a certain amount of social exclusion. A map shows these communities occur in nearly every municipality of the commonwealth. Of the 742 places that were on the list in 2014, the following barrios, communities, sectors, or neighborhoods were in Dorado: El Caño, Kuilan Barrio Espinosa, La Hormiga, Sector Calondrias, Sector El Cotto, Villa 2000, Villa Iriarte, and Villa Plata.

=== Climate ===
Dorado has a tropical climate that is very hot in the summer months and warm in the winter. Temperatures range around 60 to 80 °F (16 to 27 °C) in the winter and 75 to 95 °F (24 to 35 °C) in the summer.

Climate data for Dorado, Puerto Rico
Month	Jan	Feb	Mar	Apr	May	Jun	Jul	Aug	Sep	Oct	Nov	Dec	Year
Record high °F (°C)	90 (32)	91 (33)	95 (35)	97 (36)	98 (37)	100 (38)	99 (37)	98 (37)	101 (38)	99 (37)	95 (35)	93 (34)	101 (38)
Mean daily maximum °F (°C)	78 (26)	80 (27)	83 (28)	84 (29)	88 (31)	91 (33)	92 (33)	92 (33)	90 (32)	87 (31)	82 (28)	81 (27)	86 (30)
Mean daily minimum °F (°C)	63 (17)	64 (18)	66 (19)	70 (21)	72 (22)	73 (23)	77 (25)	77 (25)	77 (25)	75 (24)	69 (21)	66 (19)	71 (22)
Record low °F (°C)	50 (10)	49 (9)	50 (10)	59 (15)	62 (17)	67 (19)	68 (20)	68 (20)	69 (21)	60 (16)	55 (13)	53 (12)	49 (9)
Average precipitation inches (mm)	3.55 (90)	3.11 (79)	1.02 (26)	2.78 (71)	3.55 (90)	7.20 (183)	6.20 (157)	5.84 (148)	5.60 (142)	3.71 (94)	8.47 (215)	5.65 (144)	56.68 (1,439)
Source: The Weather Channel

== Culture ==
=== Tourism ===
To stimulate local tourism, the Puerto Rico Tourism Company launched the Voy Turistiendo ("I'm Touring") campaign, with a passport book and website. The Dorado page lists Sala de exposiciones del plata Salvador Rivera Cardona, Plaza Conmemorativa 5th Centenario, and Balneario Manuel "Nolo" Morales, as places of interest.

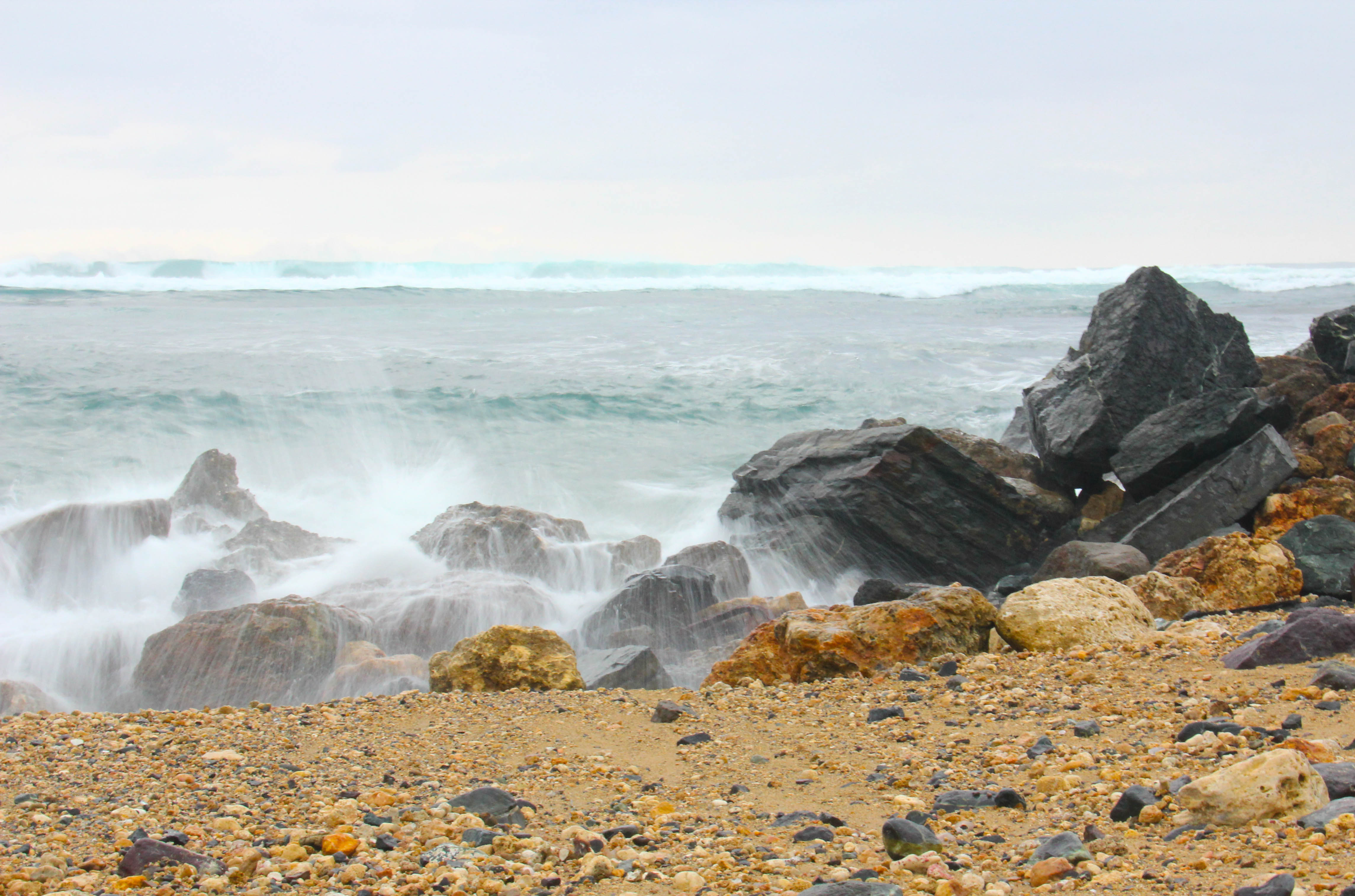
A rocky beach in Dorado

Dorado's cultural activities feature all of the traditional Puerto Rican elements, but focus on African and Spanish elements. Taíno elements are more conspicuous and mostly influence the food. Popular culture is promoted, which is represented by a number of interpreters such as Juan Boria, Joe Valle and Horacio Olivo. Local painters include José Bernandino and Marcos J. Alegría. In the early 20th century the Rockefeller family purchased plots of land in the northwest region of the municipality of Dorado where they built a huge private vacation compound. Laurance Rockefeller would later use this land to create Dorado Beach Hotel and Golf Club, which later became the Dorado Beach Hyatt Hotel which closed in 2007. Dorado Beach Hotel became a Ritz-Carlton hotel in 2012, which got the top spot in the 2019 Conde Naste Readers' Choice. The Dorado Beach Ritz-Carlton is located on 1,400 acres and 3 miles of coastline.

Dorado has long been known as a golf haven. Its tourist industry includes the Dorado Beach Resort (Ritz-Carlton Reserve & Plantation), the Hyatt Hacienda del Mar, and Embassy Suites in the Dorado Del Mar neighborhood. As of 2014 there are three operating golf courses in the municipality, the Dorado Beach East Course, the Plantation Sugarcane Course and the Plantation Pineapple Course. The Dorado del Mar course closed in 2014.

=== Landmarks and places of interest ===
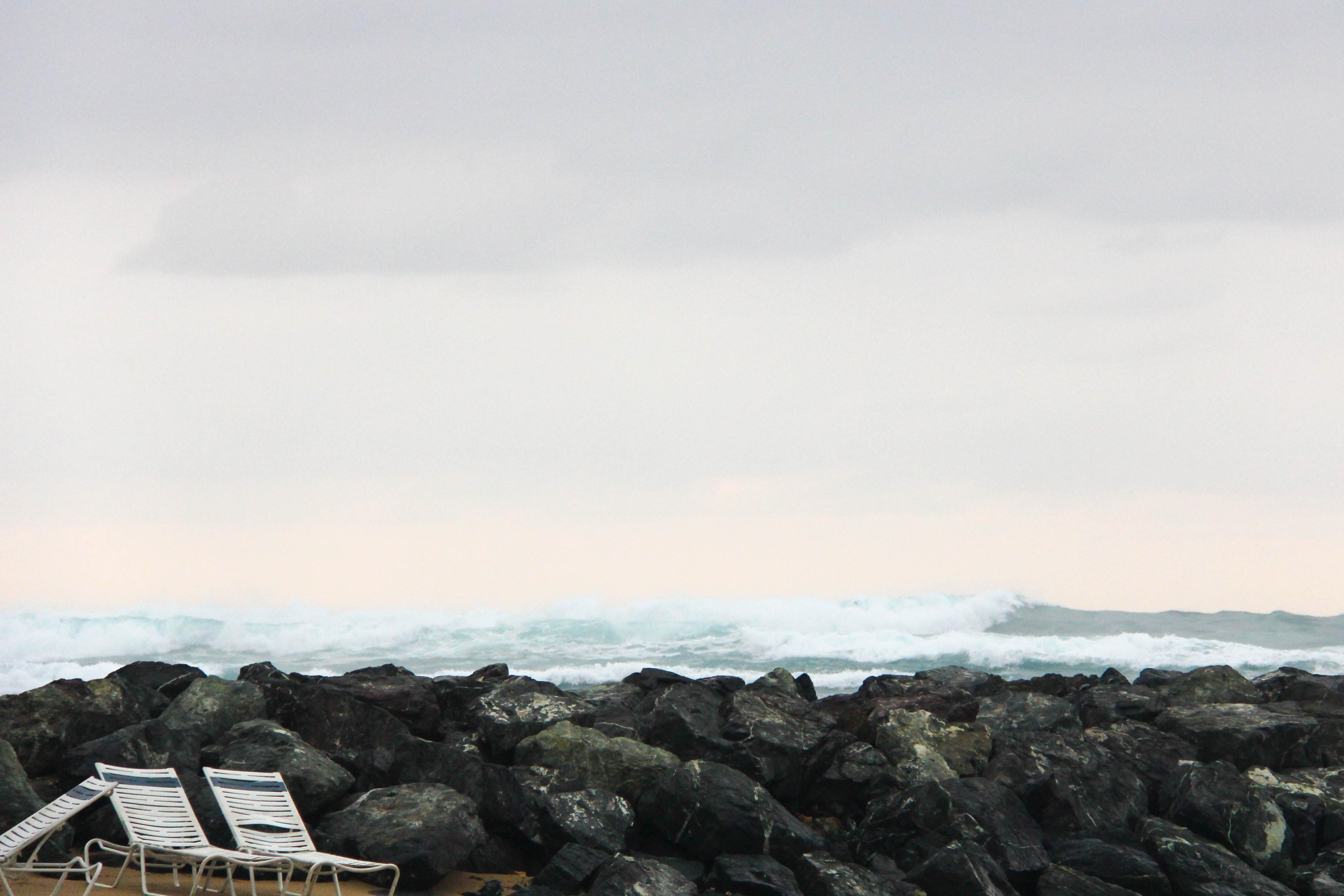
Beach chairs on a beach in Dorado

According to a news article by Primera Hora, Dorado has 24 beaches, including Balneario Manuel Nolo Morales.

Some of the places to visit in Dorado are located downtown. For example, the Museum Casa del Rey is the house built in most towns controlled by Spain during their colonization, which was intended for the King and Queen to stay if they visited. The museum includes several artifacts from the era. There's also the Distinguished Doradeños Square, and the Juan Boria Theater. The last one was recently reopened after a long period of restoration.

Some of the most visited beaches in Dorado are Sardinera, Kikita and El Unico are other beaches frequented by surfers. The Ojo del Buey Park is a park located at the base level of the La Plata River. The name comes from a rock formation that has the shape of an ox. The Dorado Pterocarpus Forest is also located in the municipality.

Dorado also has a church called the Sanctuary of Christ of the Reconciliation, that has the third largest statue of Jesus Christ in the Caribbean, inside its temple. Christmas celebrations extend throughout the season and into epiphany, prior to them the Strenna Mass is held and on Christmas Eve, the Misa de Gallo takes place. Folk traditions tied to these events include the sprinkling of sugar in houses to receive the new year, a practice where a man dresses as a representation of the old year with which residents have fun or release their frustrations for the fading year and trulla parties in which people dressed as the Three Wise Men and a vigil where music is played to celebrate the epiphany. As in the rest of Puerto Rico, this is followed by another period of celebration due to the octavas and octavitas.

=== Festivals and events ===
According to oral tradition, the Fiestas a la Santa Cruz have been celebrated since the municipality's foundation. Dorado also celebrates fiestas patronales to honor Antonio de Padua, which retain their religious origins but have included cultural activities such as trova contests, the coronation of a queen and La Alborada. During these, the municipality also celebrates a Day of the Absent Doradeños, in which those abroad visit and join a celebration in their name. Other days are dedicated to exemplary mothers and adopted citizens (the official title of "Adoptive Son" is given during these). General recreation activities include horse races, carny attractions, sack races, climbing competitions, and eating contests. A variety of traditional food and sweets are also served. Prior to Lent, a carnival is hosted, although the religious significance of the date has since been phased out beyond the interaction of the Vejigantes, La Muerte en Cueros and the Negritos. The Catholic practices attributed to Lent are widely practiced. Processions are celebrated during Easter week.

Dorado celebrates its patron saint festival in June. The Fiestas Patronales de San Antonio de Padua is a religious and cultural celebration that generally features parades, games, artisans, amusement rides, regional food, and live entertainment. The festival has featured live performances by well-known artists such as Raphy Leavitt, Ismael Miranda, and Pedro Capó.

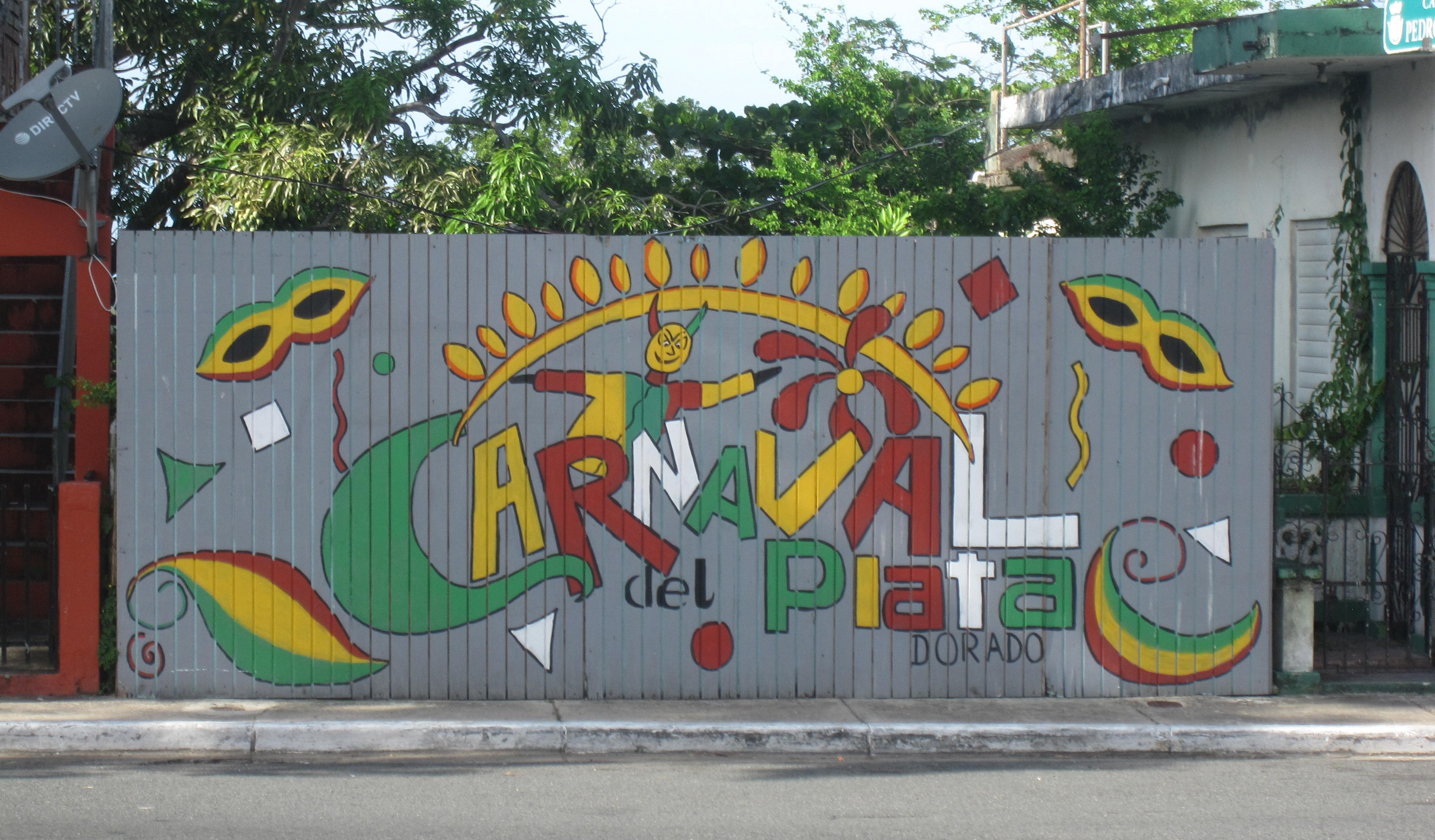
Sign for Carnaval del Plata in Dorado

Other festivals and events celebrated in Dorado include:

- Three Kings’ Day Festival – January
- Del Plata Carnival – February
- Minin Kuilan Gold Cup – April
- Cocolía Crab Festival– August
- Town and Country Festival – September
- Discovery of Puerto Rico / Puerto Rican Culture Festival – November
- Christmas Festival – December

=== Academics and arts ===
As a historically industrial town, the academic culture is mostly centered around writer José S. Alegría and poet Ferdinand R. Cestero. A Cultural Center supported by the ICP was founded in 1967, with the municipal Office of Cultural Affairs promoting these aspects. The first local poet was Société D'Emulation award winner Camille Schwingrouber. Former president of the Ateneo Puertorriqueño Ferdinand R. Cestero wrote Dorado, pueblito áureo y ensiñador... to honor the municipality. Son of former mayor Cruz Alegría, José S. Alegría was born in Dorado on July 17, 1886, and went on to direct Puerto Rico Illustrado magazine and write several books. He was also a painter, being instructed by Francisco Oller. His son, Ricardo Alegría, later became one of the most influential cultural figures in Puerto Rico. Beginning in the 1970s, Pablo Maysonet began publishing several books. The Dorado Writers and Friends of Literature Circle was founded to promote literature, but ceased functioning by 1989. A local newspaper was first published in 1903, when El Hijo del Combate circulated. The Dorado Society of Archeological Investigations was founded in 1983 and is tasked with the archeological material at Museo Casa del Rey.

Until the 1930s, weekly bomba dances were held in Calle Norte and Calle Sur. These were later preserved by the plena groups of Dorado. Other folkloric arts groups included Los Batá, Ballet Folklórico Arawak, Ballet Folklórico Amaná and other municipal and community groups. During the 1950s the municipal band and a Luteran band were created. A school band combined the high school and middle school students during the 1970s. The Meléndez brothers, Manuel and Eleuterio, were Dorado's first professional musicians. Carmen Meléndez, daughter of the second later taught piano in the municipality. Pedro, Andrés and Manuel, Jr., sons of Manuel, Sr. went on to play several instruments. Pianist Lidia Morales, an alumnus of Arístiles Chavier, was also born in Dorado. During the 1960s, Germán Jímenez composed a number of vals and danzas. Marcos J. Alegría was the municipality's first career painter. During the 1970s, the José S. Alegría school began teaching dramatic arts at the behest of Laura Iglesias. During the 1980s, a theatre named Teatro Juan Boria and an arts school named Academia de Arte Dramático Aramaná were created, along a municipal theatre group. Other plastic artists that followed in his footsteps were Jaime Rivera, Marco A. Alegría, Jesús Cardona, Luis R. Nieves, Salvador Rivera and Basilio Cardona. In 1919, Cine Juana de Arco was founded.

=== Sports ===
Despite producing some athletes, sports were not widely promoted until the foundation of the intermunicipal Olimpiadas del Plata during the 1970s. The formal events include a marathon held in November. Paso Fino, an indigenous sport, has been among the most practiced, with the Kuilan family gaining prominence due to it. Francisco Kuilan is a second generation rider and won competitions held locally and internationally in places like Paris, where he won a non-Paso Fino competition with a horse named Dulce Sueño in a tour sponsored by Félix Benítez Rexach. He served as namesake for the Minín Kuilan Cup, held by the municipality of Dorado since 1988.

Local athletes include Abimelec Ortiz, Manolín Maldonado and Angel Maysonet, baseball players Toño Cardona, Nolín Valderrama, Arturito de Jesús, Germán Lanzó, Pedro Díaz, Pito Álvarez, Peoe Carbia, Tomás Palmeras, Mampostial Sánchez, Fabián Cardona and Talí Maldonado and chess player Cucü Alegría, runners Juan Cruz and Millo Lorenzana, and boxers Tony Villa, Carmelo Vázquez and Rafael Santana. Dorado has its own Double A baseball team called Los Guardianes (The Guardians). Within sports entertainment, professional wrestlers Ray González and Damian Priest were raised in the municipality.

The Edgar Martínez Sports Complex is located in Dorado was restored after sustaining damage with the passing of Hurricanes Irma and Maria.

== Economy ==
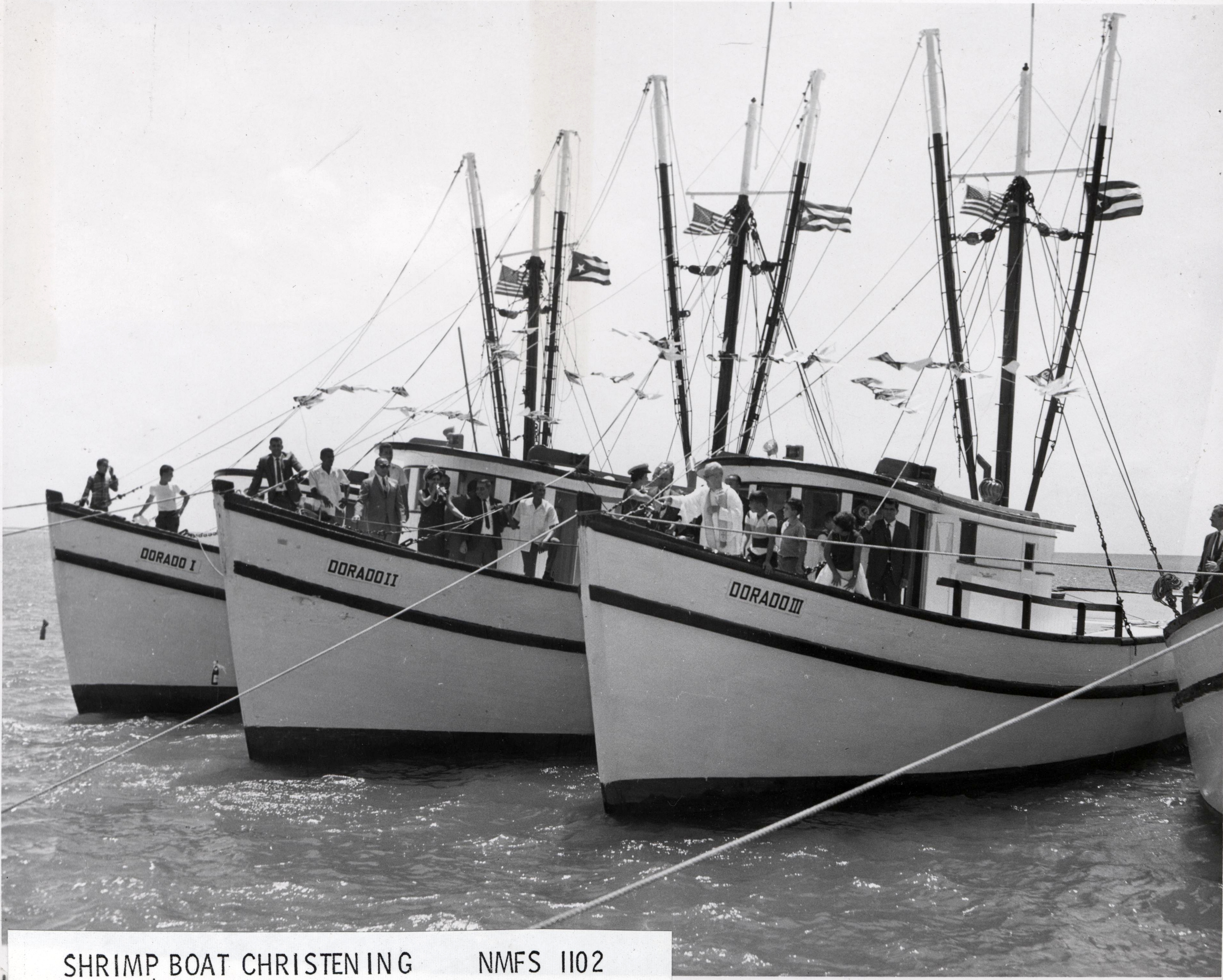
Shrimp boats acquired by the Dorado Fishing Cooperative in Puerto Rico in 1965

=== Agriculture ===
In 2007, there were ten farms in Dorado, producing plantains, coffee, vegetables or melons, bananas, root crops or tubers, grains, grasses and other crops, poultry and eggs, cattle and calves, milk products, hogs and pigs, aquaculture, other livestock, and other livestock products. The top livestock produced in Dorado are cattle and calves, horses, hogs and pigs. The top crop items were lawn grass (sod), coffee, pigeon peas, cassava, and other vegetables.

=== Business ===
Commerce Tourism and pharmaceuticals.

=== Industry ===
Dorado is the site of several industries dedicated to the manufacturing of clothing and medical equipment, among others. Companies like Boston Scientific, Pfizer and Heraeus are among some of the ones located in the city.

=== Housing developments ===
In recent years, Dorado has been known for its development of upscale neighborhoods. Several known politicians and artists (e.g. Ricky Martin, Carlos Romero Barceló) live or own properties in the city.

== Demographics ==
Historical population
Census	Pop.	Note	%±
1900	3,804		—
1910	4,885		28.4%
1920	5,842		19.6%
1930	7,579		29.7%
1940	9,481		25.1%
1950	11,749		23.9%
1960	13,460		14.6%
1970	17,388		29.2%
1980	25,511		46.7%
1990	30,759		20.6%
2000	34,017		10.6%
2010	38,165		12.2%
2020	35,879		−6.0%
2025 (est.)	35,891	▲	0.0%
U.S. Decennial Census; 1899 (shown as 1900) 1910–1930; 1930–1950 1960–2000 2010 2020

Dorado's population has steadily increased during the past century. According to the 2000 census, the population consist of 34,017 with a population density of 1,479.0 people per square mile (571.0 people/km^{2}) more than doubling the town's population of 17,388 in 1970. The 2020 census indicated the first decline (6%) since the U.S. census has been carried out on the island. According to the 2020 census the town has a population of 35,879.

As a whole, Puerto Rico is populated mainly by people from a Criollo (born on the island of Spanish descent) or European descent, with small groups of African and Asian descent. Statistics taken from the 2000 census shows that 74.1% of Doradeños identify with Spanish or White origin, 12.2% identify as black, and 0.5% as Amerindian.

As of 2000, speakers of English as a first language accounted for 16.89% of the population.

Race – Dorado, Puerto Rico – 2000 Census
Race	Population	% of Total
White including Hispanic	25,219	74.1%
African American	4,147	12.2%
American Indian and Alaska Native	157	0.5%
Asian	60	0.2%
Native Hawaiian/Pacific Islander	7	0.0%
Some other race	3,214	9.4%
Two or more races	1,213	3.6%

=== Religious affiliation ===
Due to the influence of Spanish culture, a majority of Dorado's population still practices Catholicism. There are two religious patrons, the Virgen del Rosario and Antonio Abad. Esteban Mariani was placed in charge of the Dorado Parish on June 29, 1848. Since then, several priests served the function until Salvador Carratala was charged in 1925. Afterwards, the Dominican Fathers took over in 1927 and held the office until Salvador Pujolas' one-year stint in 1930. The following year, the Augustinian Fathers took over until handling it to the Congregation of the Mission in 1937. The following year, José Delgado was tasked with the parish until the Holy Spirit Fathers took over in 1943.

The Getsemaní Lutheran Church was founded on July 25, 1911. Initially ran by foreign ministers, until Demetrio Texidor consecrated a temple in August 1924. On December 30, 1945, Carlos Torres became the first officially installed reverend serving the office for 5 years, after years of the office being distributed between locals and foreigners. During the following years, the entity continued its expansion plans under Miguel Sevilla. In 1954, Victor Astacio took over and under him the Church hosted its first synod of the Caribbean event. In 1961, Gilberto Falcón took over and began a project to construct a new temple with the old one hosting its last service on July 19, 1964. Rafael Malpica Padilla, a Doradeño, also served as reverend. During the 1950s, the Lutheran Church created a club for performing arts, where they enacted plays that were mostly centered around nativity.

During the 1920s, Leonor Martínez of Centro Espiritista Caridad bajo Gloria organized several dramatic works to gather funds for the spiritist organization.

== Government ==
All municipalities in Puerto Rico are administered by a mayor, elected every four years. The current mayor of Dorado is Aníbal José Torres, of the Popular Democratic Party (PPD) after the passing of Carlos López on October 17, 2025. López was first elected at the 1988 general elections.

The city belongs to the Puerto Rico Senatorial district III, which is represented by two Senators. In 2012, José "Joito" Pérez and Angel Martínez were elected as District Senators.

== Symbols ==
The municipio has an official flag and coat of arms.

=== Flag ===
The official flag of the Municipality of Dorado is made up of three stripes of equal width and the symbols from the coat of arms are within the brown stripe, in a sideways position. A first stripe of gold is followed by a stripe of brown which is followed by a final stripe of gold. The gold or golden stripes symbolize the town's name, Dorado; and the brown stripe represents the patron Saint of Dorado, Saint Anthony of Padua. A brown, equal-sided triangle is placed with its base at the hoist and leads to the second stripe, inside of which are the disks in the shape of a T and with the lily flowers represented with the Fleur-de-lis.

=== Coat of arms ===
The Dorado coat of arms was officially adopted on March 27, 1978. Its colors are gold, silver and brown. The three towers at the top are enameled in gold with brown background for windows. The triple tower represents that Dorado is a town, and a municipality.

Below the mural crown, are five disks which form a letter "T", called Tau. This represents Saint Anthony of Padua, who is associated with the lily flower. Saint Anthony of Padua is depicted with a lily, heraldically with the Fleur-de-lis. They have a brown background and the lily flowers are silver because they represent the majestic Río La Plata ("plata" is Spanish for silver), which borders the town of Dorado to the east.

The golden background with the brown disks are like speaking souls (Spanish: almasparlantes). The shield directly represents the name of the town "Dorado" which means "gold" in Spanish and the brown relates to the Patron Saint Anthony of Padua, whose habit is brown.

== Education ==
Dorado has several public and private schools distributed through several regions. Including TASIS, Dorado Academy, New Testament Christian Academy of Dorado, and Public education is handled by the Puerto Rico Department of Education.

José S. Alegría is the public High School, located in the town center. Ricardo Arroyo Laracuente is the Middle School 7th through 9th Grade. In the town next to the town square is the elementary School named Jacinto López Martínez.

=== Schools and academies ===
- Dorado Academy
- TASIS Dorado
- José S. Alegría High School
- Pedro López Canino Elementary and Middle School
- Luis Muñoz Marín Elementary School
- Ricardo Arroyo Middle School
- Marcelino Canino Canino – Middle School
- Jacinto López Martínez – Elementary school and first school building to be founded in Dorado. It is over a hundred years old and still in use and one of the biggest schools.
- Luisa Valderrama Martínez – Elementary school
- The Jane Stern Dorado Community Library, founded in 1974, is Puerto Rico's first public bilingual library. Recipient of a 2008 National Medal for Museum and Library Service.
- Cristóbal Santana Melecio Elementary School

== Health care ==
Dorado's main health facility is a Center for Diagnostic and Treatment located at Road 698. The facility is able to handle emergency cases, but severe cases are transferred to bigger hospitals in nearby towns such as Bayamón or Manatí.

== Transportation ==
Puerto Rico Highway 22 provides access to Dorado from the far away city of Mayagüez, or from San Juan. Road 165 also provides access from Cataño and Bayamón bordering the shore to the Atlantic Ocean. It takes approximately 30 minutes to reach the town from San Juan.

Like most other towns in the island, it has a public transportation system consisting of public cars. Taxis are also available around the town. There's also a public trolley system around town and a shuttle service for handicapped people.

There are 19 bridges in Dorado.

Dorado Airport was a commercial airport that served the city with flights to San Juan and to the United States, but it has since been closed.

== Notable residents ==
- José S. Alegría, poet, writer, lawyer and politician.
- Juan Boria, poet
- Onix Concepción, Major League Baseball shortstop
- Logan Paul, professional wrestler and influencer.
- Damian Priest, professional wrestler and former WWE World Champion

== See also ==
- Municipalities of Puerto Rico
- List of communities in Puerto Rico

== Bibliography ==
- Canino Salgado, Marcelino J. (1993). Dorado, Puerto Rico: Historia, Cultura, Biografias y Lecturas. Administración Municipal del Dorado, Dorado, P.R.
