= New River =

New River may refer to:

== Waterways ==
=== Caribbean ===
- Nuevo River (Puerto Rico)
- Rio Nuevo (Jamaica)

=== Europe ===
- New River (Fens), a man-made watercourse in the English Fenlands
- New River (London), a man-made watercourse in Hertfordshire and London

=== North America ===
- New River (Mexico–United States) (Rio Nuevo in Spanish), which flows from the Mexicali Valley in Baja California into the Salton Sea in California
- New River (Trinity River tributary), a tributary of the Trinity River in northern California
- New River (Broward County, Florida), a channel which drains the Everglades through Fort Lauderdale in South Florida
- New River (Carrabelle River tributary), a tributary of the Carrabelle River in Florida
- New River (Santa Fe River tributary), a tributary of the Santa Fe River in northern Florida
- New River (Hillsborough River tributary), a tributary of the Hillsborough River (Florida) in Hillsborough and Pasco Counties in Florida
- New River (Chattahoochee River tributary), in Georgia
- New River (Withlacoochee River tributary), in Georgia
- New River (Louisiana), in Ascension Parish
- New River (Michigan)
- New River (New Hampshire), a tributary of the Ellis River on Mount Washington
- New River (eastern North Carolina), which flows into the Atlantic Ocean in southeastern North Carolina
- New River (Kanawha River tributary), a tributary of the Ohio River via the Kanawha River, in North Carolina, Virginia, and West Virginia
- New River (Oregon), in southwestern Oregon, parallels the Pacific Ocean between Coos Bay and Port Orford
- New River (South Carolina), which flows through Bluffton, South Carolina into the Atlantic Ocean
- New River (Tennessee), a tributary of the Cumberland River in Tennessee
- New River, a tributary of the Agua Fria River in Arizona
- Archaic name for the current path of the San Gabriel River in California

=== Oceania ===
- New River / Kaimata in the West Coast region of New Zealand
- An alternative name for the Ōreti River in New Zealand, most commonly used for its estuary

=== South and Central America ===
- New River (Belize), a river that flows north into Chetumal Bay
- New River (South America), claimed by Suriname and Guyana
  - New River Triangle, the area of dispute

== Other places ==
- New River, Arizona, a census-designated place in the Phoenix, Arizona metropolitan area
- Bradford County, Florida, named New River County from 1858 through 1861
- New River Tunnel, in Ft. Lauderdale, Florida
- Marine Corps Air Station New River, near Jacksonville, North Carolina
- New River Valley, in Virginia
- New River Community College, in Virginia
- New River Coalfield, in West Virginia
- New River Gorge Bridge, in West Virginia
- New River Gorge National River, protecting a portion of the river in West Virginia
- New River Trail State Park, in Virginia
- New River (ward), London Borough of Hackney
- New River City, English name of Zhanaozen, Mangystau region, Kazakhstan

== Other uses ==
- New River (album), a 2001 album by David Grisman and Denny Zeitlin
- "New River", a 2017 song by The Oh Hellos from their album Notos
- "New River Blues", a 2007 song by Michael Hurley from his album Ancestral Swamp
- "The New River", a 1921 song by Charles Ives from his song cycle 114 songs

== See also ==
- Novo River (disambiguation)
- Rio Nuevo (disambiguation), Spanish for 'New River'
- Xinhe (disambiguation), Chinese for 'New River' (新河)
- Old River (disambiguation)
