= Novo River =

Novo River or Rio Novo may refer to the following:

== Places ==
- Rio Novo do Sul, Espírito Santo
- Rio Novo, Minas Gerais

== Rivers in Brazil ==
- Novo River (Anauá River tributary)
- Novo River (Coxim River tributary)
- Novo River (Espírito Santo)
- Novo River (Iriri River tributary)
- Novo River (Jamanxim River tributary)
- Novo River (Matupiri)
- Novo River (Minas Gerais)
- Novo River (Paraguay River tributary)
- Novo River (Paranapanema River tributary)
- Novo River (Pardo River tributary)
- Novo River (Rondônia)
- Novo River (Santa Catarina)
- Novo River (Sono River tributary)
- Novo River (Xeriuini River tributary)

== Other uses ==
- Rio Novo (Venice), a canal in Venice, Italy

== See also ==
- New River (disambiguation)
