= Hacienda de Carlos Vassallo =

Historic place in Dorado, Puerto Rico

- U.S. National Register of Historic Places
- U.S. Historic district
- Puerto Rico Historic Sites and Zones
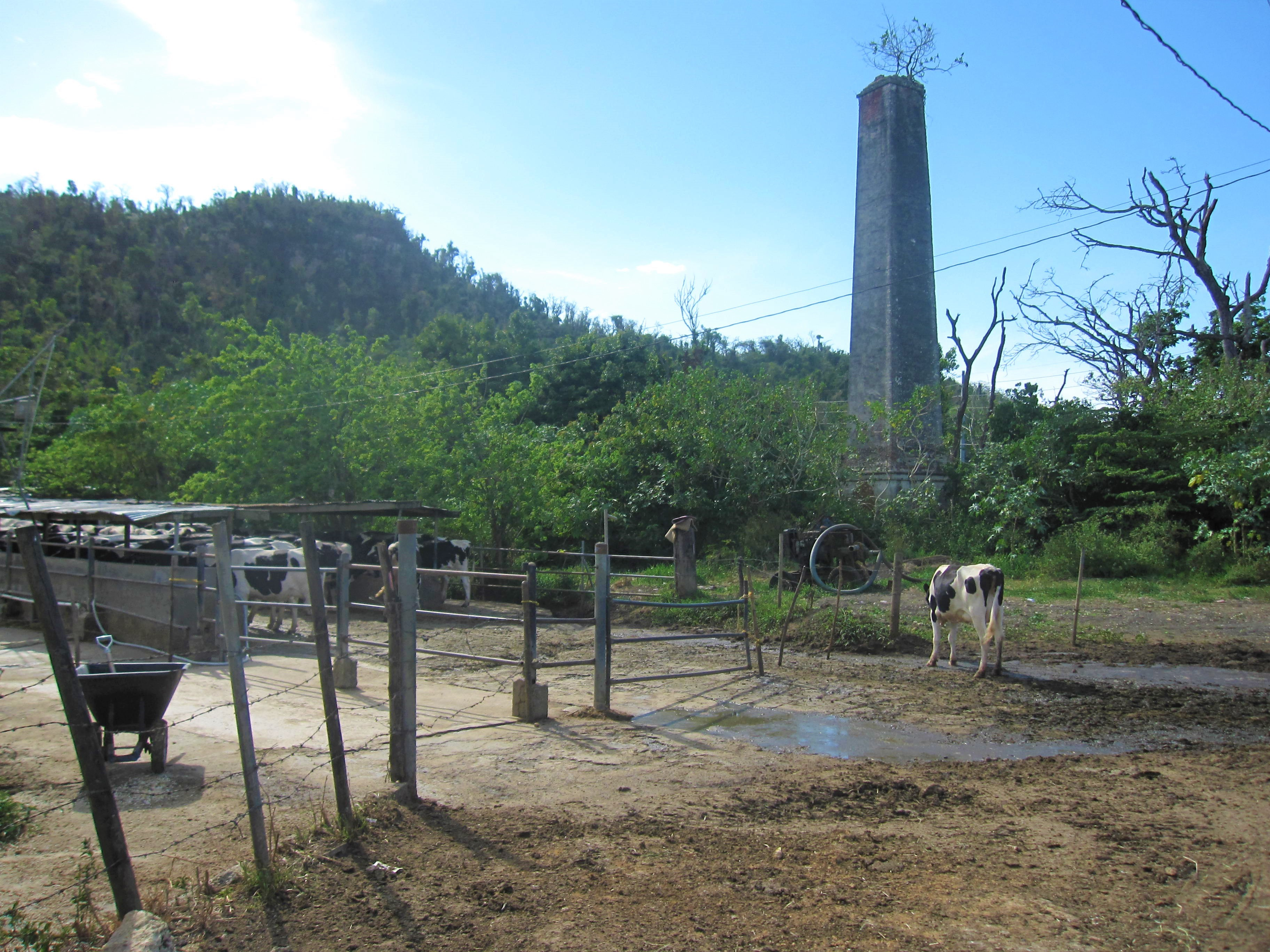
- Historic smoke stack

- Location within Puerto Rico
- Location: Puerto Rico Highway 693, Km. 0 Dorado, Puerto Rico
- Coordinates: 18°24′42″N 66°15′50″W
- Area: 300 acres (120 ha)
- Built: 1849
- NRHP reference No.: 88001848
- RNSZH No.: 2000-(RMSJ)-00-JP-SH

Significant dates
- Added to NRHP: March 22, 1989
- Designated RNSZH: February 3, 2000

Hacienda de Carlos Vassallo is a historic place in the town and municipality of Dorado, in Puerto Rico. It is also known as Casa Hacienda de Don Oscar Nevárez, or Hacienda de Río Nuevo.

It is the agriculture, architecture and industry surrounding this hacienda that makes it an important part of Puerto Rican history and culture.

The privately owned property has had many owners over the years, including Don José Nevares. Oscar Nevares, the uncle of Ricardo Rosselló, the governor of Puerto Rico, has a house there. The hacienda is now being used as a dairy farm with over 350 cows and is located next to the Plata River, where cows from the farm can be seen from Puerto Rico Highway 693 and Puerto Rico Highway 2.

It was listed on the U.S. National Register of Historic Places on March 22, 1989, and on the Puerto Rico Register of Historic Sites and Zones in 2000.

Still standing, is a historic smoke stack from 1861, a chimney which was used when the hacienda was a sugarcane mill.

== Gallery ==
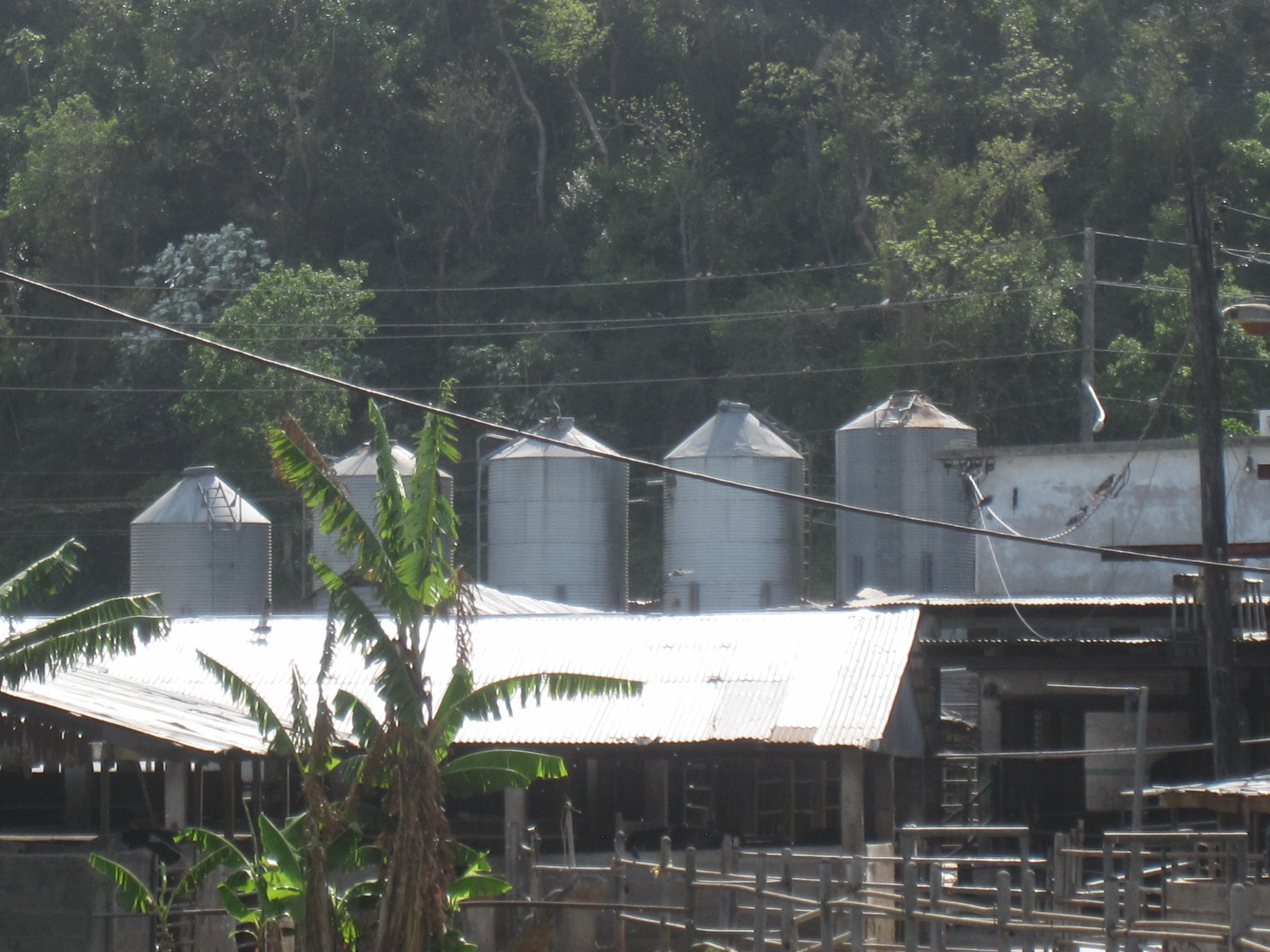
Dairy farm structures

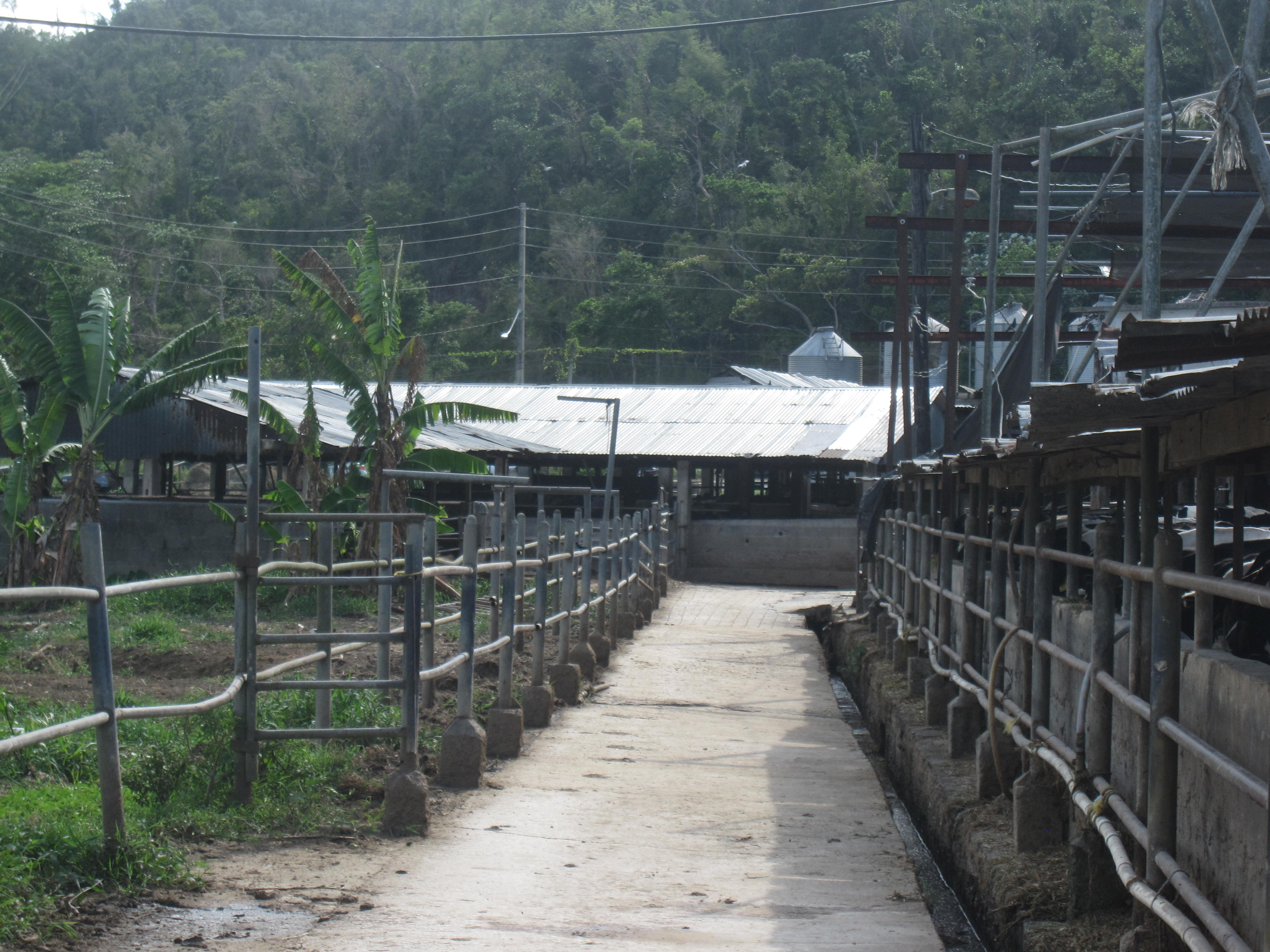
Cow stables

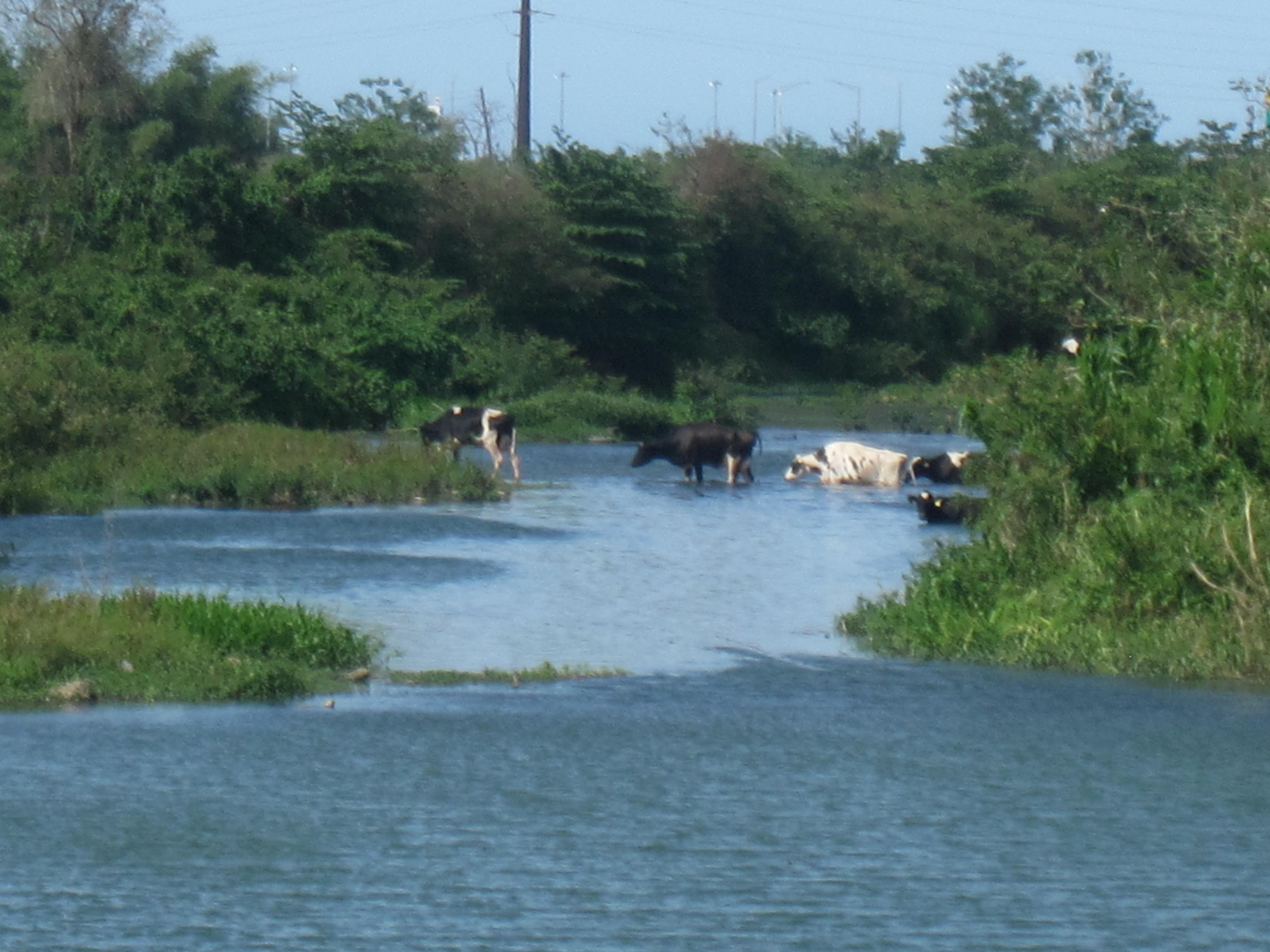
Hacienda de Carlos Vassallo cows at the nearby river in Dorado

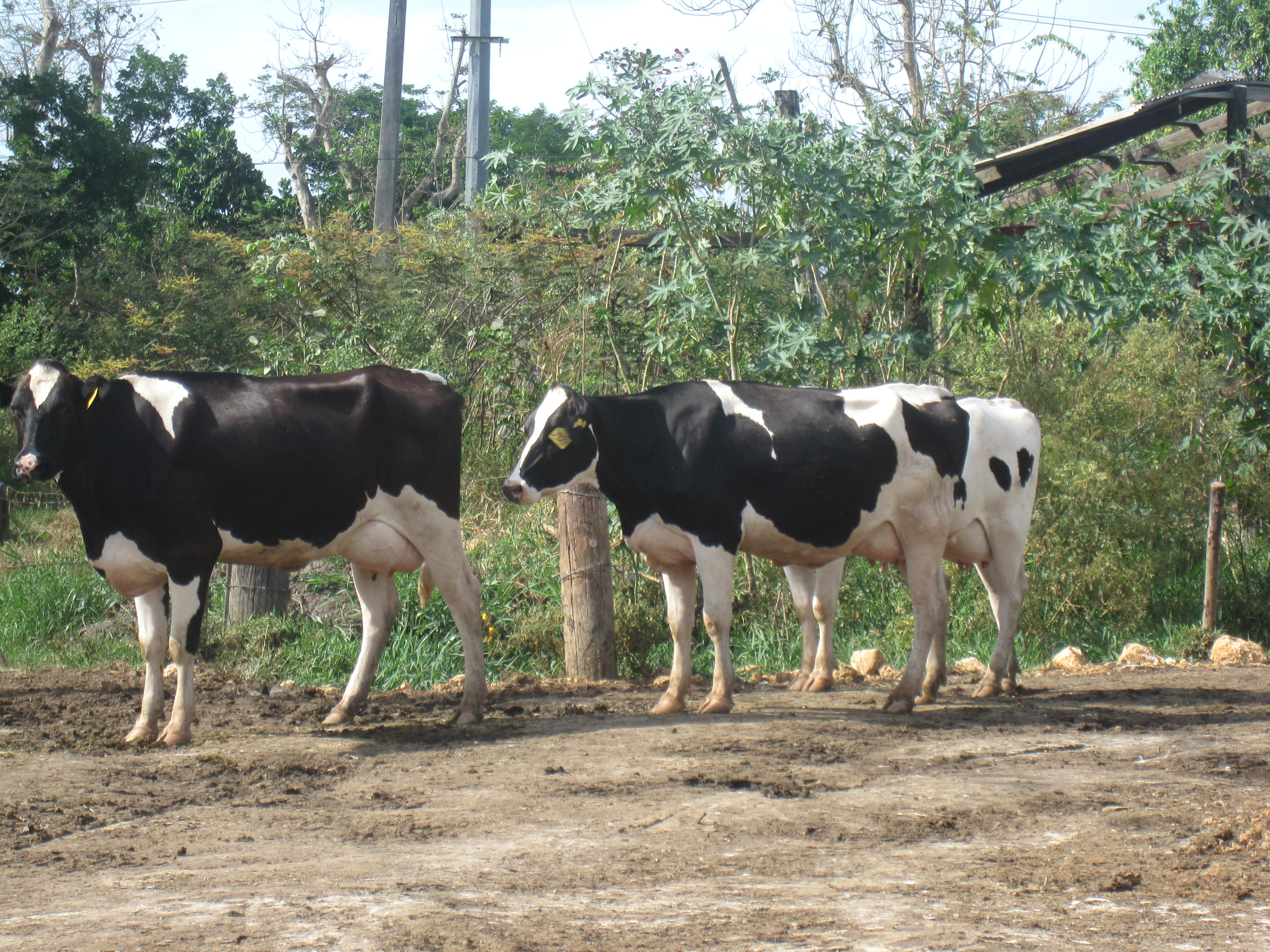
Cows in line to be milked

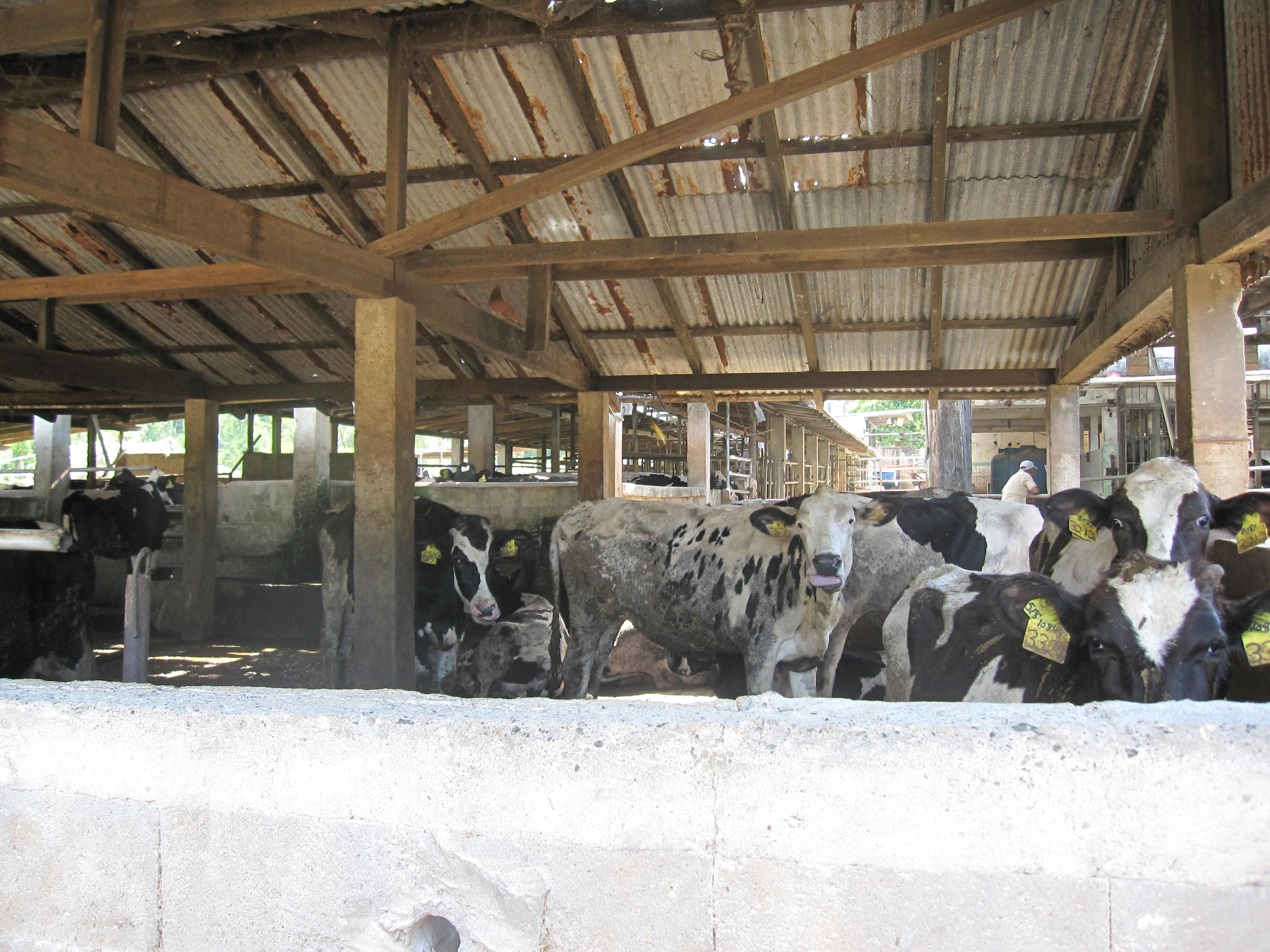
Cows at Hacienda de Carlos Vassallo

== See also ==
- National Register of Historic Places listings in Puerto Rico
