= Rio Nuevo (disambiguation) =

Rio Nuevo, or the New River, is a river that flows north from the Mexicali Valley in Mexico, into the United States towards the Salton Sea.

Rio Nuevo may also refer to:

- Rio Nuevo (Jamaica), a river of Jamaica
- Río Nuevo (Puerto Rico), a river of Puerto Rico

== See also ==
- New River (disambiguation)
