= Puerto Rico Highway 693 =

Highway in Puerto Rico

Highway 693
- Ruta 693

Route information
- Maintained by Puerto Rico DTPW
- Length: 15.4 km (9.6 mi)
- Existed: 1953–present

Major junctions
- South end: PR-2 / PR-165 in Río Lajas
- PR-22 / PR-659 in Maguayo; PR-694 in Maguayo; PR-695 in Higuillar; PR-6693 in Higuillar; PR-6165 in Dorado barrio-pueblo; PR-699 in Dorado barrio-pueblo; PR-698 in Higuillar; PR-696 in Higuillar; PR-697 in Higuillar; PR-6690 in Sabana
- North end: PR-690 in Sabana

Location
- Country: United States
- Territory: Puerto Rico
- Municipalities: Dorado, Vega Alta

Highway system
- Roads in Puerto Rico; List
← PR-690	→ PR-715
← PR-6690	PR-6693	→ PR-7156

Puerto Rico Highway 693 (PR-693) is a road located between the municipalities of Dorado, Puerto Rico and Vega Alta, passing through downtown Dorado. It begins at its intersection with PR-2 and PR-165 in Río Lajas and ends at PR-690 in Sabana. It is a short divided highway in southern Dorado, which serves as an alternate route for PR-165 west of Río de la Plata.

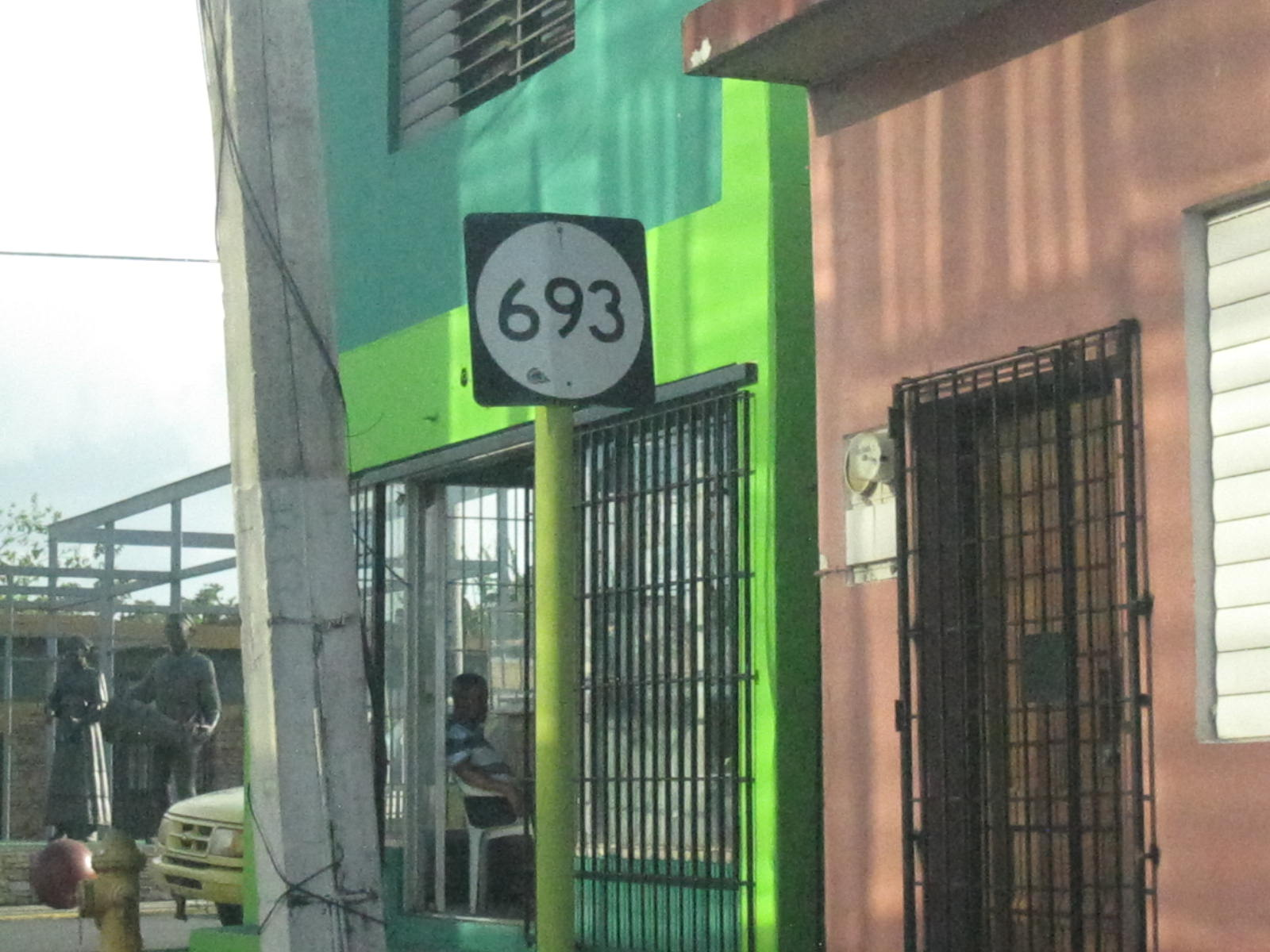
Puerto Rico Highway 693 south in downtown Dorado

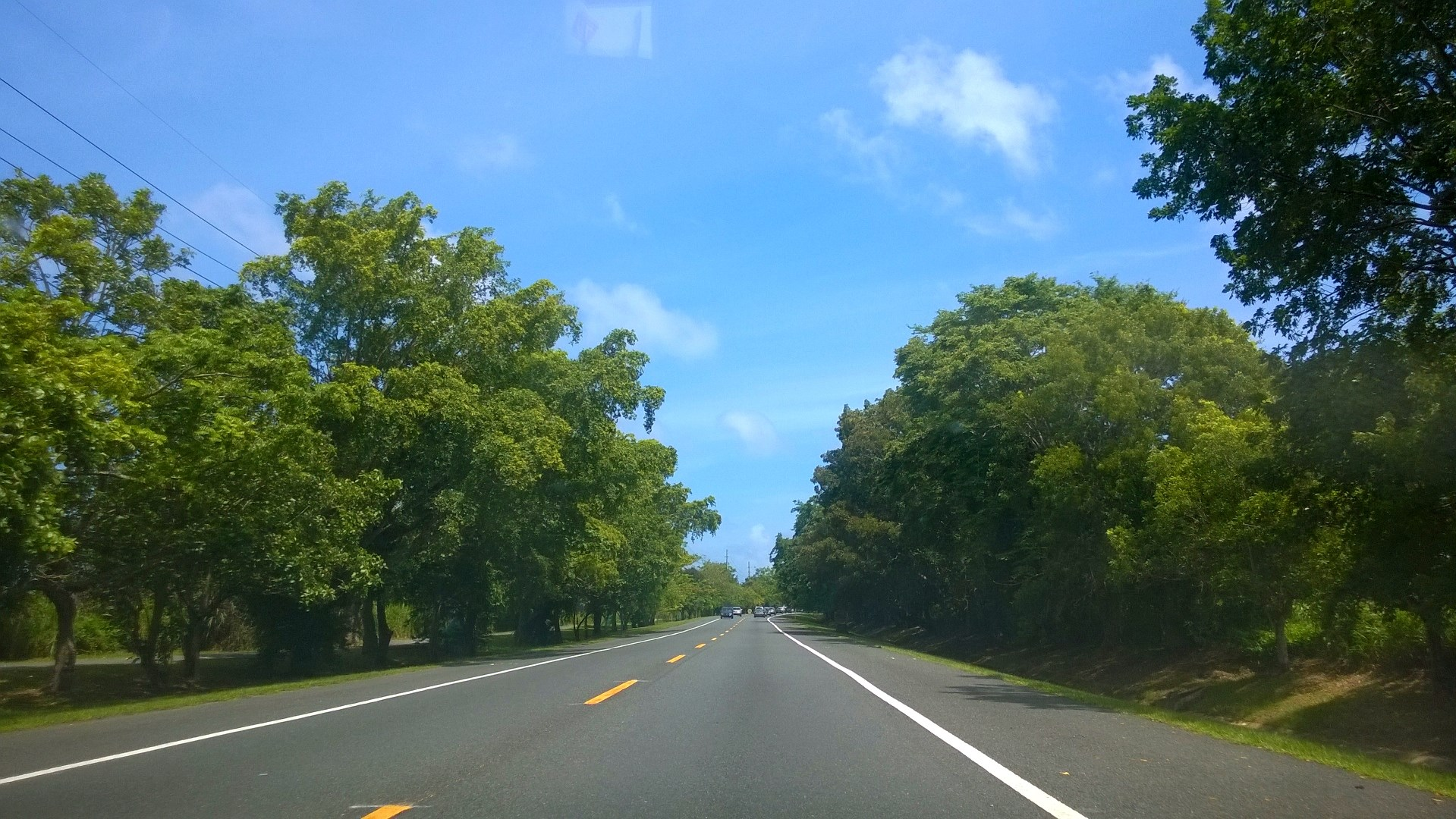
Puerto Rico Highway 693 north in Higuillar, Dorado

== Major intersections ==
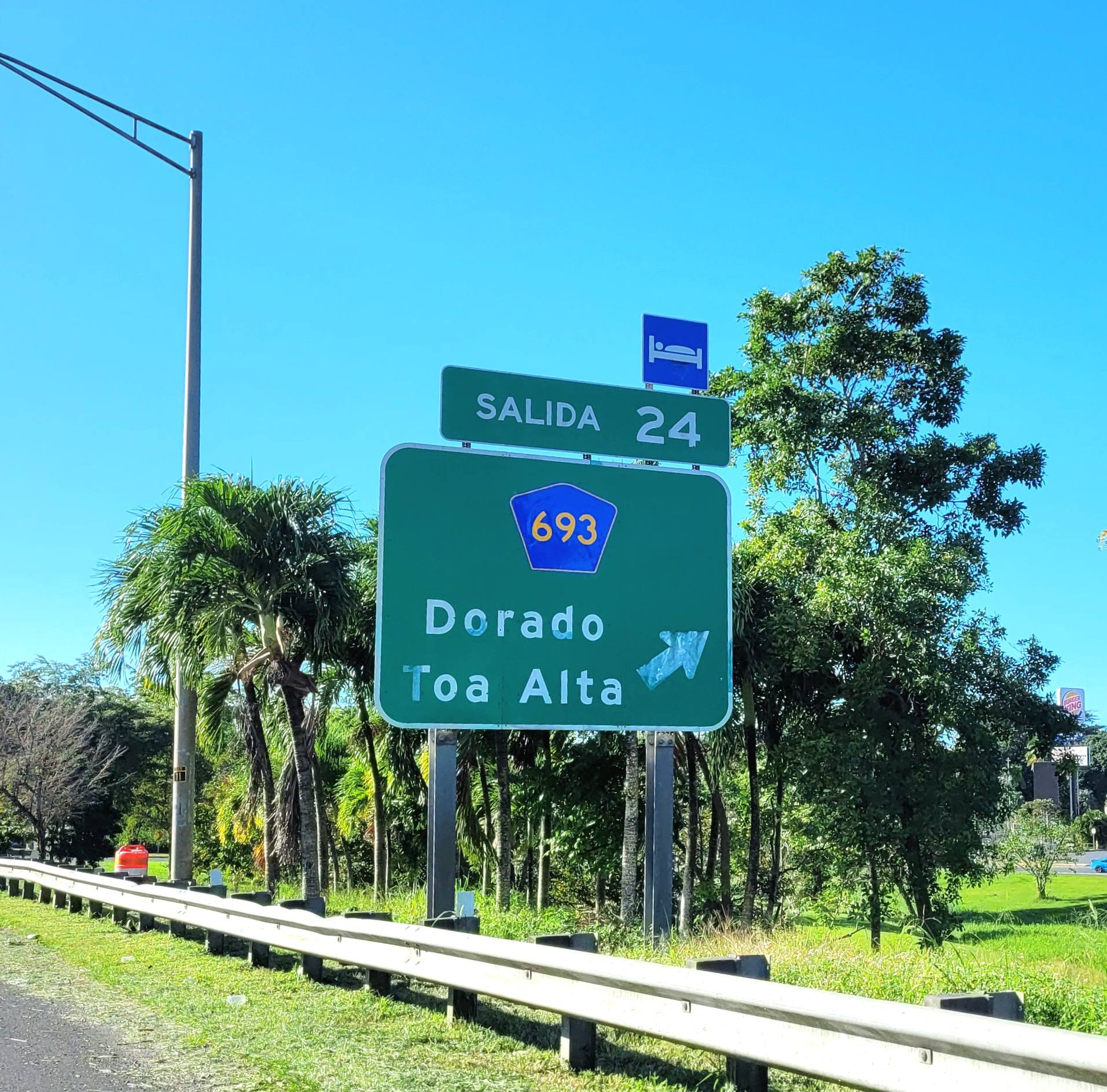
PR-22 west at exit 24 to PR-693 in Maguayo, Dorado

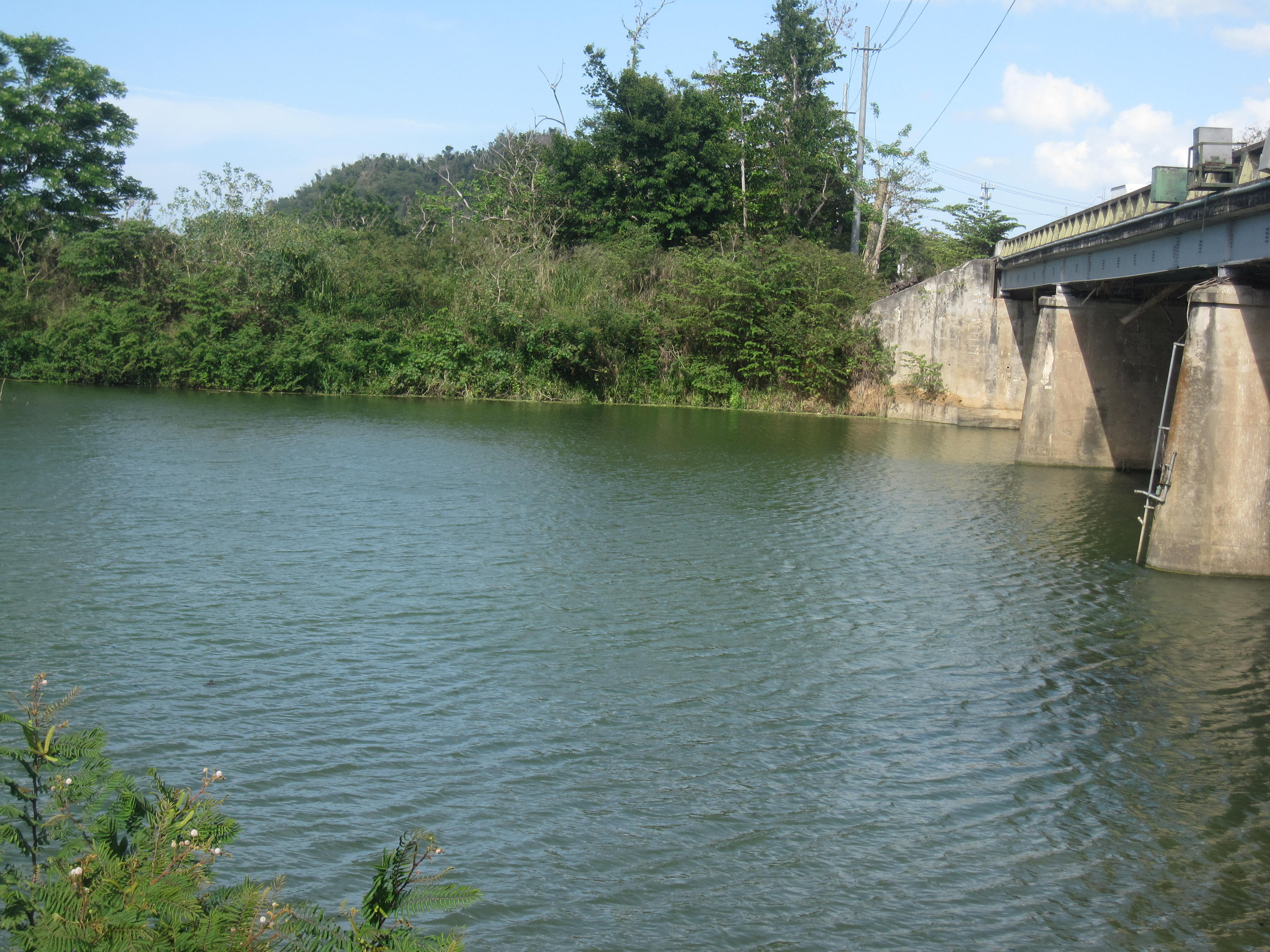
View of PR-2 bridge over the La Plata River between Dorado and Toa Baja from PR-693

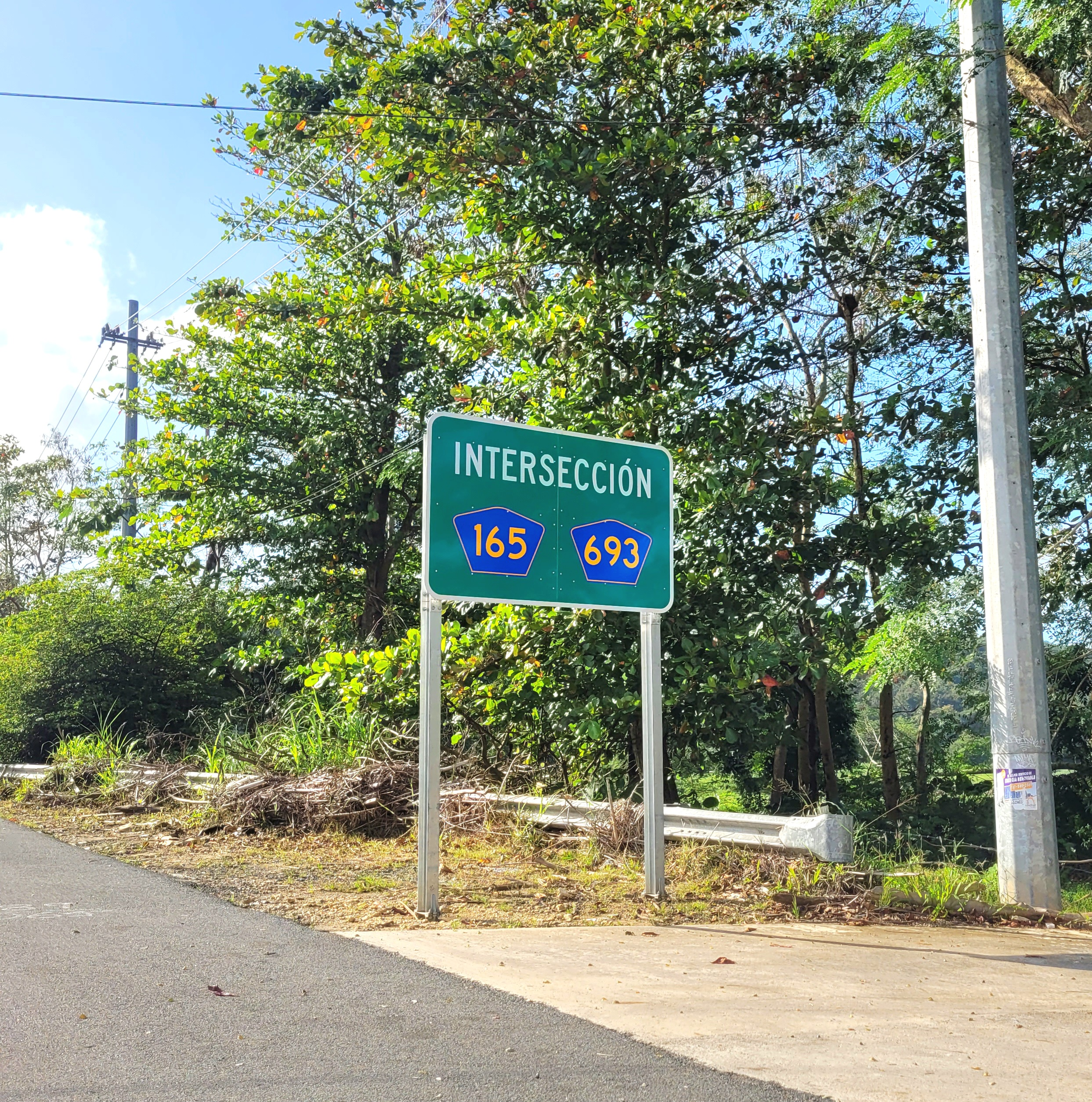
PR-2 west near PR-165 and PR-693 intersection in La Virgencita

Municipality	Location	km	mi	Destinations	Notes
Dorado	Río Lajas	0.0	0.0	PR-165 south (Carretera Río Lajas) – Toa Alta	Continuation beyond PR-2; PR-165 north access via PR-2 east
Dorado	Río Lajas	0.0	0.0	PR-2 – Vega Alta, Bayamón	Southern terminus of PR-693
Dorado	Maguayo	0.5	0.31	Puente del Río Nuevo over the Río Nuevo	
Dorado	Maguayo	1.4– 1.7	0.87– 1.1	PR-22 (Autopista José de Diego) – Arecibo, San Juan; PR-659 – Santa Rosa	PR-22 exit 24; partial cloverleaf interchange
Dorado	Maguayo	2.6	1.6	PR-694 (Carretera Carmelo Mercado Adorno) – Maguayo	
Dorado	Higuillar	3.2	2.0	PR-695 (Carretera Pedro Barbosa Román) – Vega Alta	Seagull intersection; access to Higuillar
Dorado	Higuillar	5.5	3.4	PR-6693 (Desvío Sur Felisa Rincón de Gautier) – Higuillar	
Dorado	Dorado barrio-pueblo	6.0	3.7	PR-6165 east – Toa Baja	
Dorado	Dorado barrio-pueblo	6.4	4.0	PR-699 (Calle Francisco Escudero) – Higuillar	One-way street; southbound access via Calle Bailen
Dorado	Higuillar	7.2	4.5	PR-698 (Avenida Doctor Pedro Albizu Campos) – Mameyal	
Dorado	Higuillar	7.4– 7.5	4.6– 4.7	PR-696 (Avenida Guillermo E. Arce Vargas) – San Juan, Arecibo, Toa Alta	
Dorado	Higuillar	8.2	5.1	PR-697 – Dorado	
Dorado	Higuillar	8.8	5.5	PR-6696 (Avenida José Efrón) – Higuillar	
Vega Alta	Sabana	14.1	8.8	PR-6690 – Sabana	
Vega Alta	Sabana	15.4	9.6	PR-690 – Vega Alta	Northern terminus of PR-693
1.000 mi = 1.609 km; 1.000 km = 0.621 mi: Incomplete access

== Related route ==
Highway 6693
- Location: Dorado
- Length: 1.3 km (0.81 mi)

Puerto Rico Highway 6693 (PR-6693) is a spur of PR-693 located in Dorado. This road is a bypass located south of the downtown area and goes from PR-693 to PR-696. The entire route is located in Higuillar, Dorado.

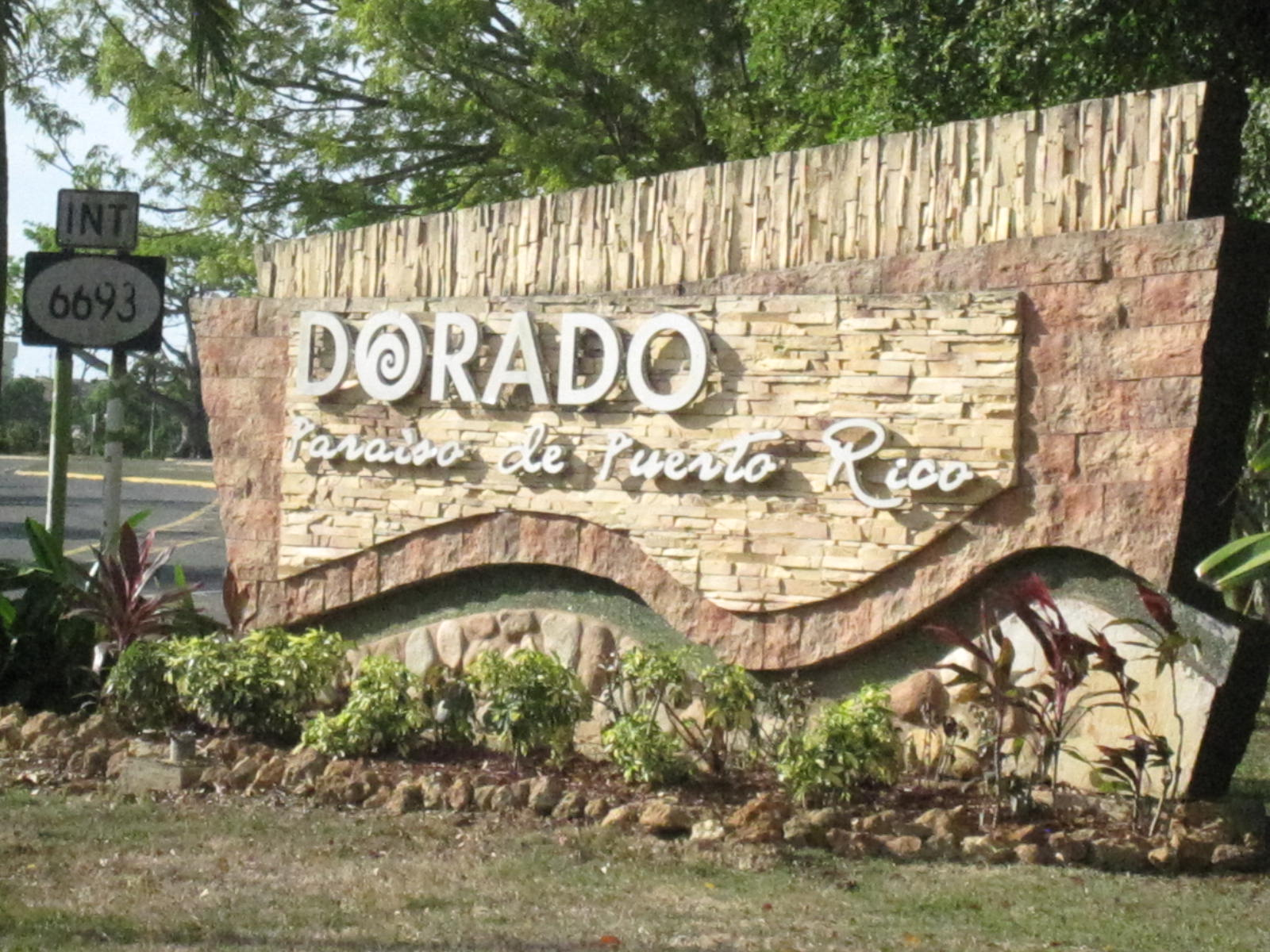
PR-693 south approaching PR-6693 intersection

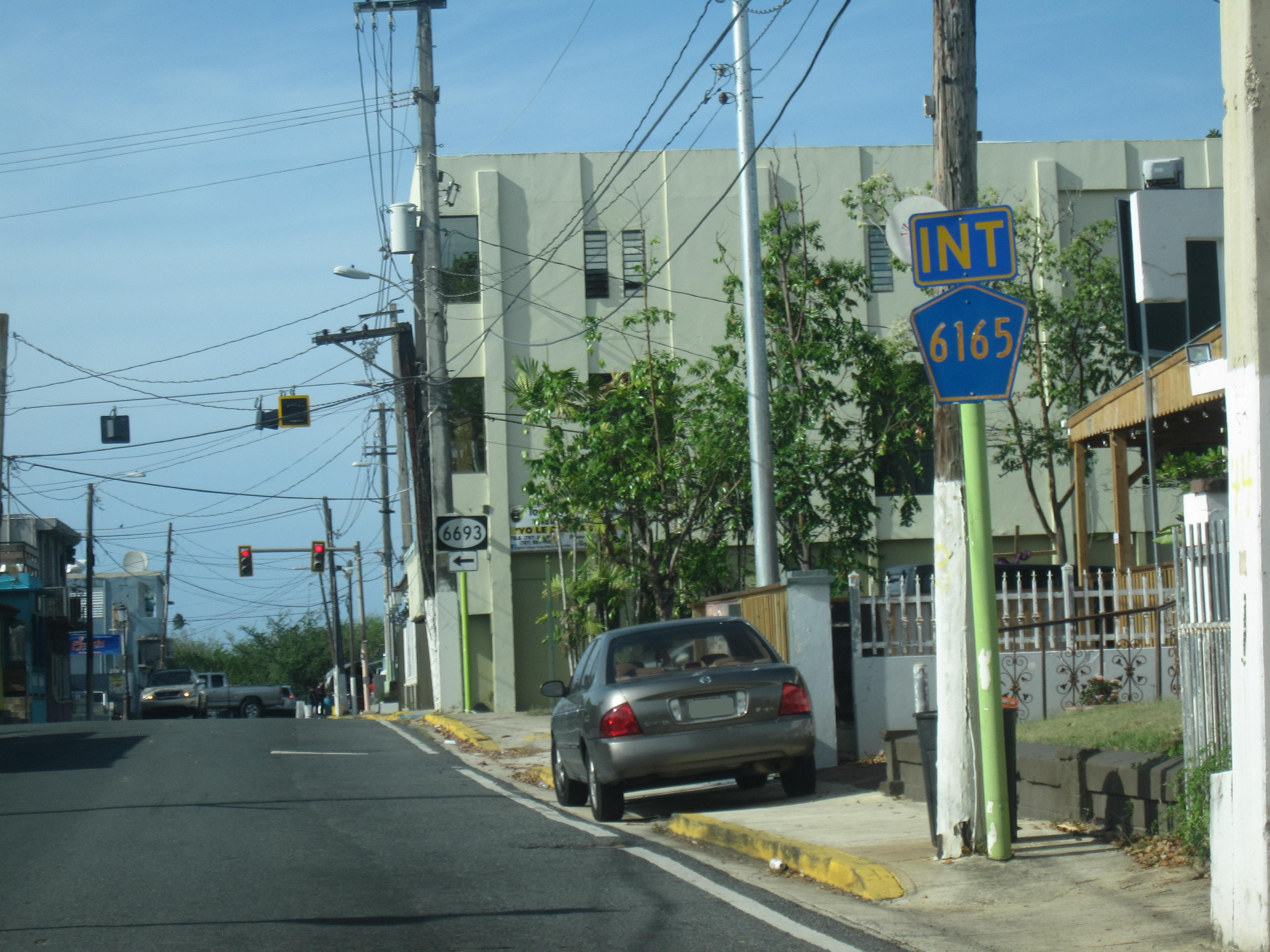
PR-6165 and PR-6693 signs in Dorado barrio-pueblo

km	mi	Destinations	Notes
0.0	0.0	PR-696 – Vega Alta, San Antonio	Western terminus of PR-6693; access to Hyatt Residence Club Dorado
0.6– 0.7	0.37– 0.43	PR-699 – Dorado Centro	Southern terminus of PR-699
1.3	0.81	PR-693 – Dorado, San Juan, Arecibo, Toa Alta	Eastern terminus of PR-6693
1.000 mi = 1.609 km; 1.000 km = 0.621 mi

== See also ==
- 1953 Puerto Rico highway renumbering
