= Maguayo =

Barrio of Dorado, Puerto Rico

- Barrio
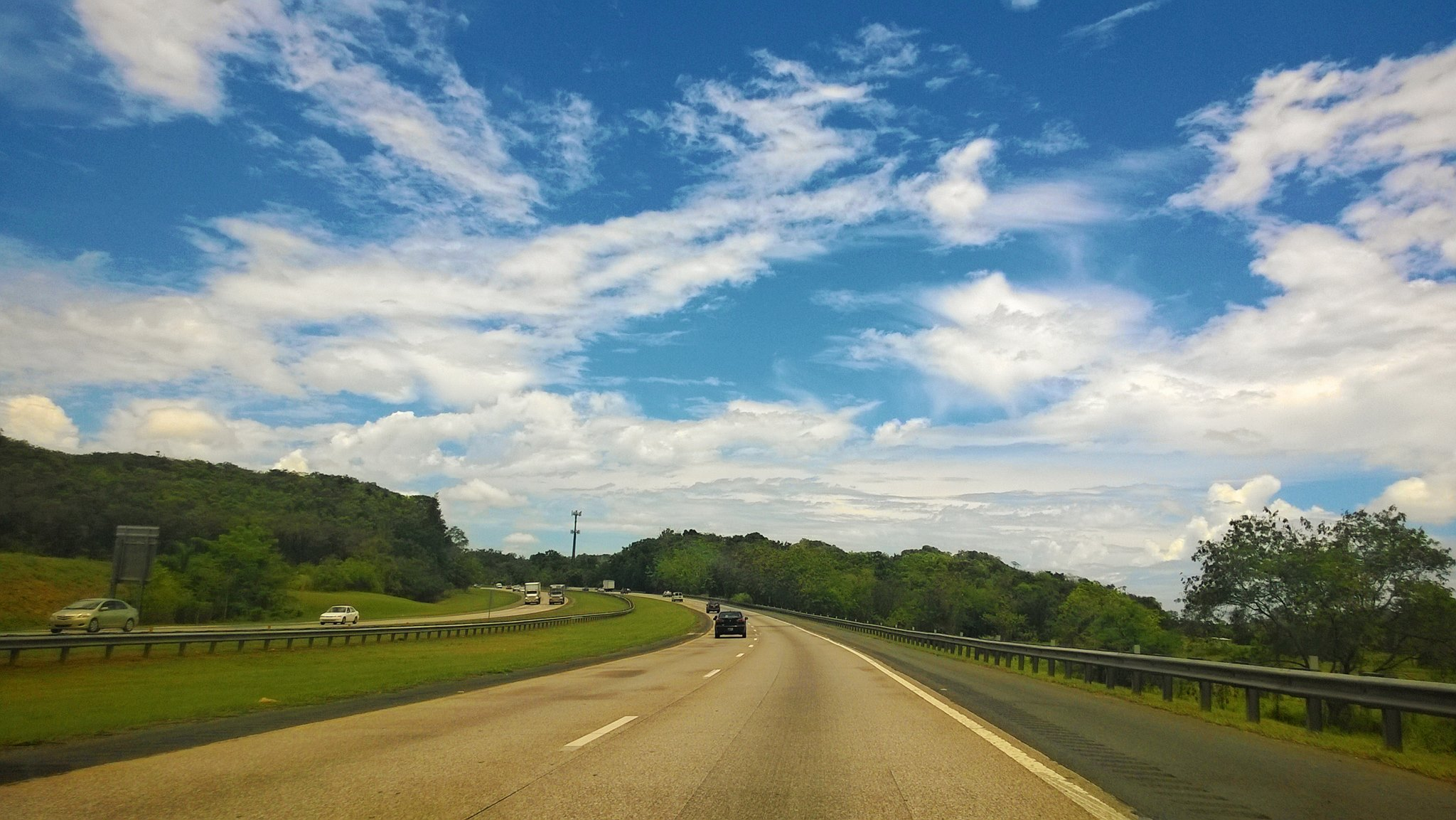
- Puerto Rico Highway 22 in Maguayo

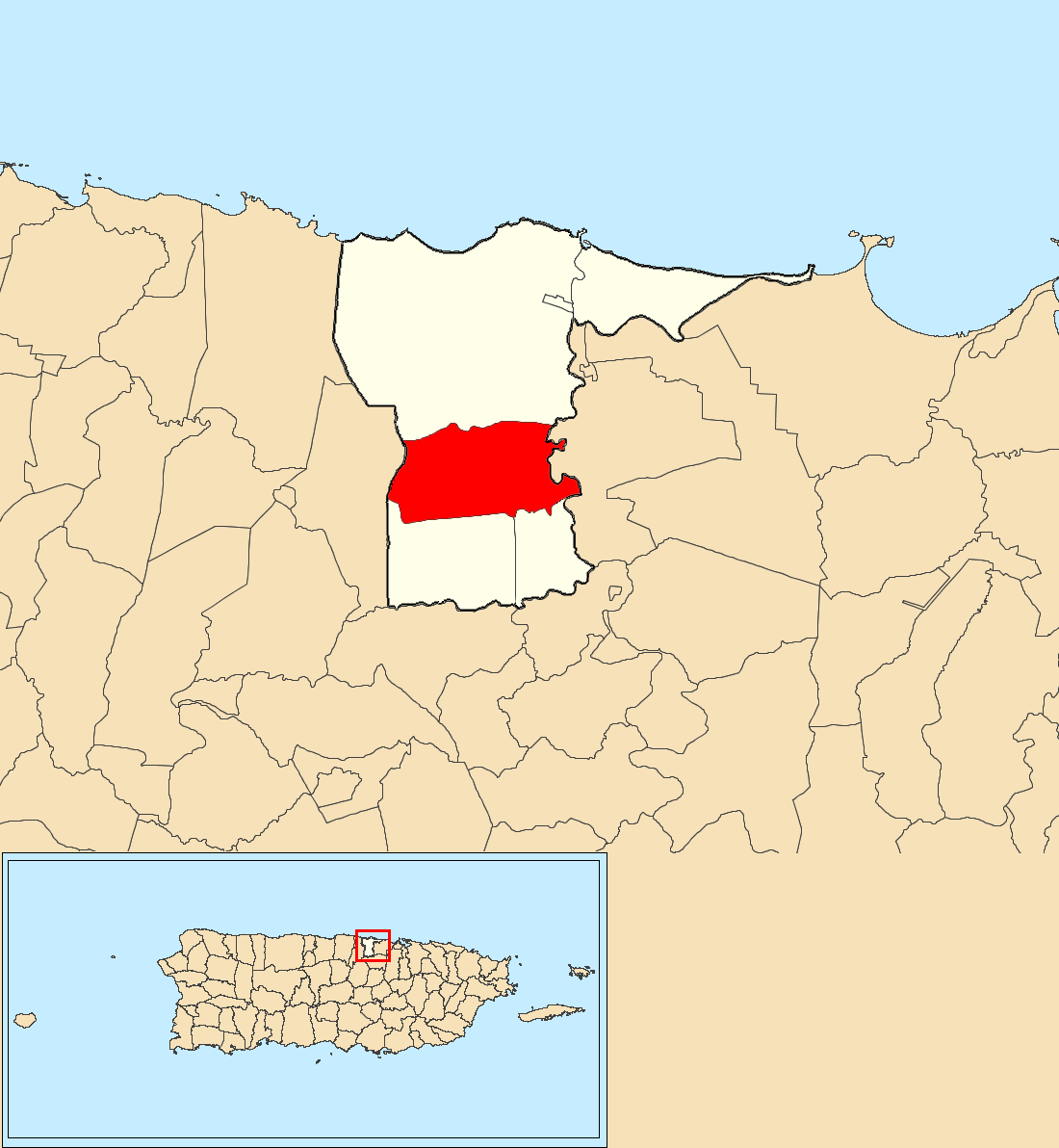
- Location of Maguayo within the municipality of Dorado shown in red

- Location within the Caribbean
- Coordinates: 18°24′49″N 66°16′28″W
- Commonwealth: Puerto Rico
- Municipality: Dorado

Area
  - Total: 3.88 sq mi (10.0 km^{2})
  - Land: 3.86 sq mi (10.0 km^{2})
  - Water: 0.02 sq mi (0.052 km^{2})
- Elevation: 135 ft (41 m)

Population (2010)
  - Total: 4,496
  - Density: 1,164.8/sq mi (449.7/km^{2})
- Source: 2010 Census
- Time zone: UTC−4 (AST)
- ZIP Code: 00646

Maguayo is a barrio in the municipality of Dorado, Puerto Rico. Its population in 2010 was 4,496.

== History ==
Maguayo was in Spain's gazetteers until Puerto Rico was ceded by Spain in the aftermath of the Spanish–American War under the terms of the Treaty of Paris of 1898 and became an unincorporated territory of the United States. In 1899, the United States Department of War conducted a census of Puerto Rico finding that the population of Maguayo barrio was 764.

Historical population
Census	Pop.	Note	%±
1900	764		—
1910	876		14.7%
1920	1,116		27.4%
1930	1,478		32.4%
1940	1,770		19.8%
1950	2,378		34.4%
1960	2,428		2.1%
1970	2,645		8.9%
1980	2,948		11.5%
1990	3,826		29.8%
2000	4,711		23.1%
2010	4,496		−4.6%
U.S. Decennial Census; 1899 (shown as 1900) 1910-1930; 1930-1950 1980-2000 2010

In 2017, after Hurricane Maria destroyed infrastructure and disrupted electrical and water services, residents of Maguayo were getting water from a well that is on the List of Superfund sites (a site containing toxic substances) until officials from the Environmental Protection Agency secured the location.

== Sectors ==
Barrios (which are, in contemporary times, roughly comparable to minor civil divisions) in turn are further subdivided into smaller local populated place areas/units called sectores (sectors in English). The types of sectores may vary, from normally sector to urbanización to reparto to barriada to residencial, among others.

The following sectors are in Maguayo barrio:

Parcelas El Cotto, Sector Abra, Sector Calandria, Sector Camino Los Nieves, Sector Cotto Martell, Sector Cuatro Calles, Sector El Cotto, Sector Los Bloise, Sector Los Dávila, Sector Los Torres, Sector Maguayo Adentro, Sector Maracayo, Sector Martell, Sector Maysonet I y II, Sector Polvorín, Sector Río Nuevo (PR-693), Sector Santa Rosa (Jazmín, Guayabo, Combate), Urbanización Alturas de Plata, Urbanización Bosque Dorado, and Urbanización Valle del Dorado.

In Maguayo barrio is part of the Río Lajas comunidad.

== Notable residents ==
Major League Baseball player Edgar Martínez spent his formative years in Maguayo. In 2019, when he was inducted into the Baseball Hall of Fame he thanked "his people", the people of Maguayo and the mayor of Dorado said that a celebration would be held to receive him.

== Gallery ==
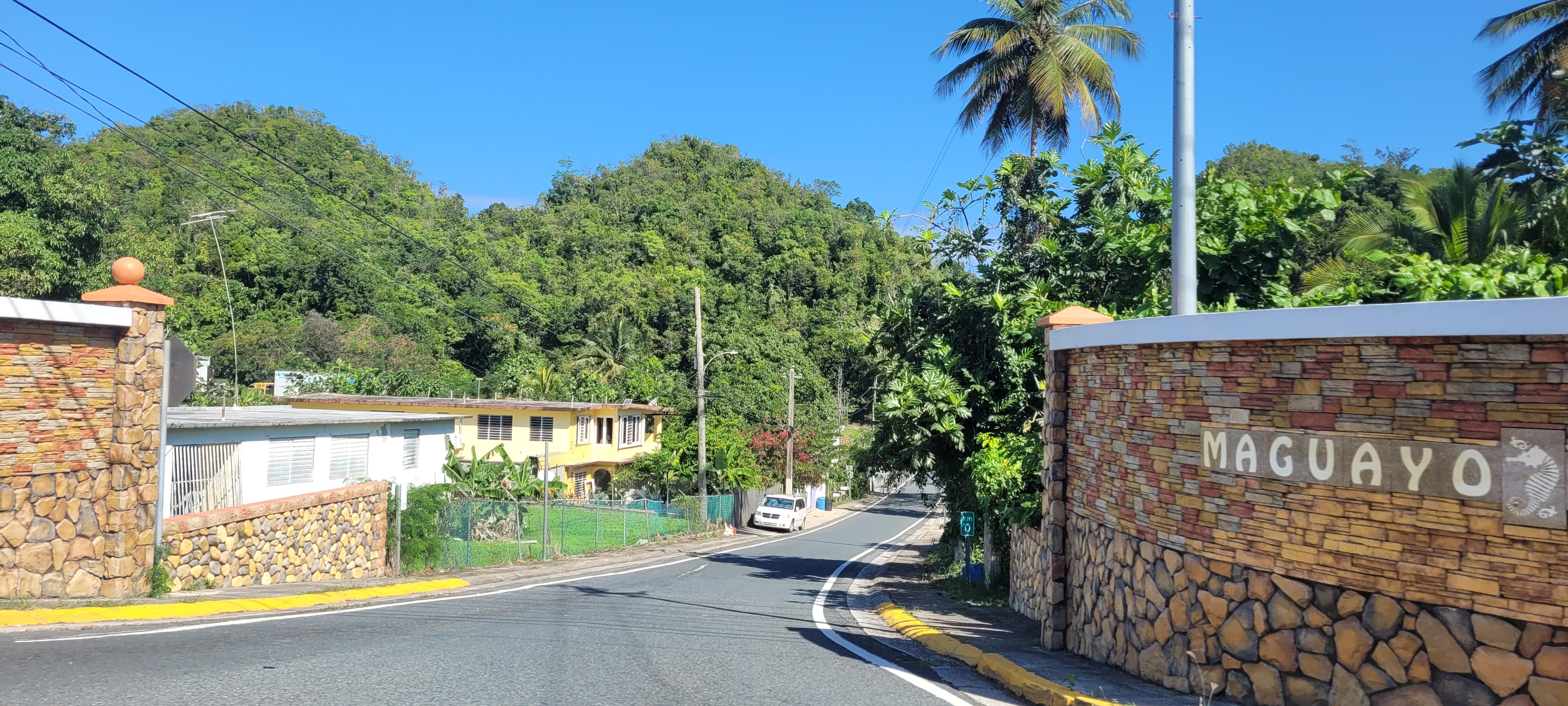
Puerto Rico Highway 659 in Maguayo

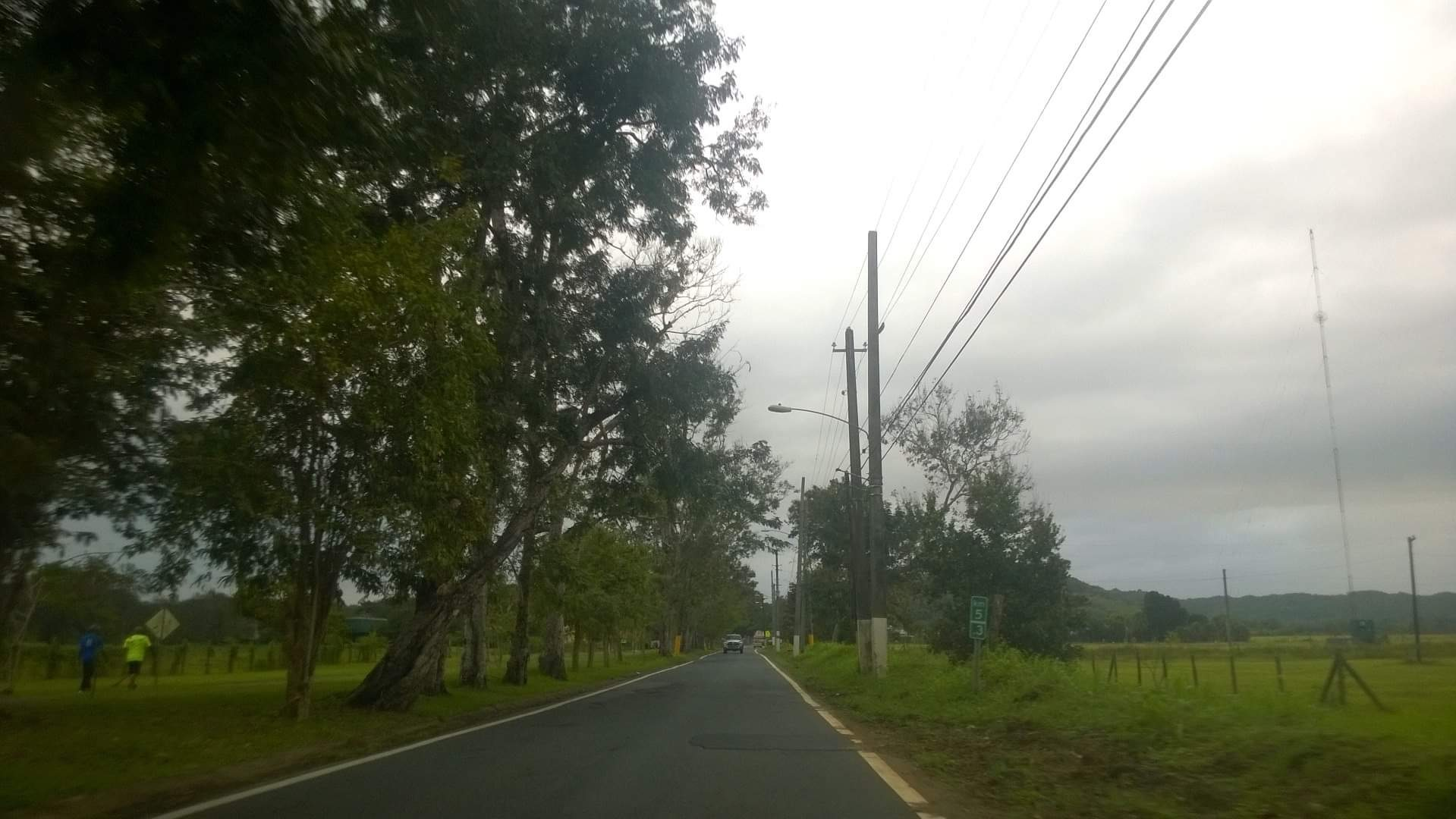
Puerto Rico Highway 694 between Maguayo and Higuillar

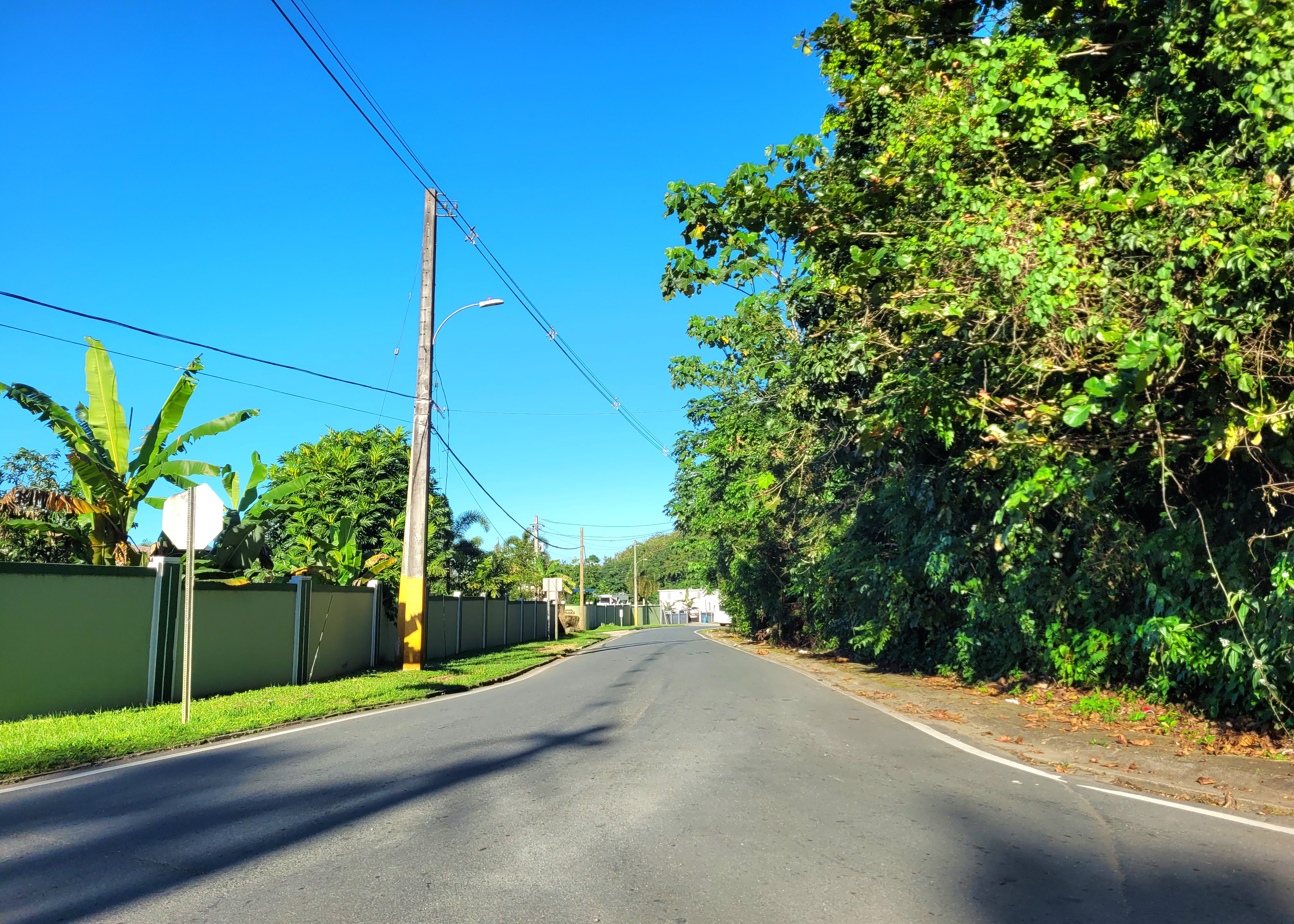
Puerto Rico Highway 6659 in Maguayo

== See also ==
- List of communities in Puerto Rico
- List of barrios and sectors of Dorado, Puerto Rico
