= Higuillar =

Barrio of Dorado, Puerto Rico

- Barrio
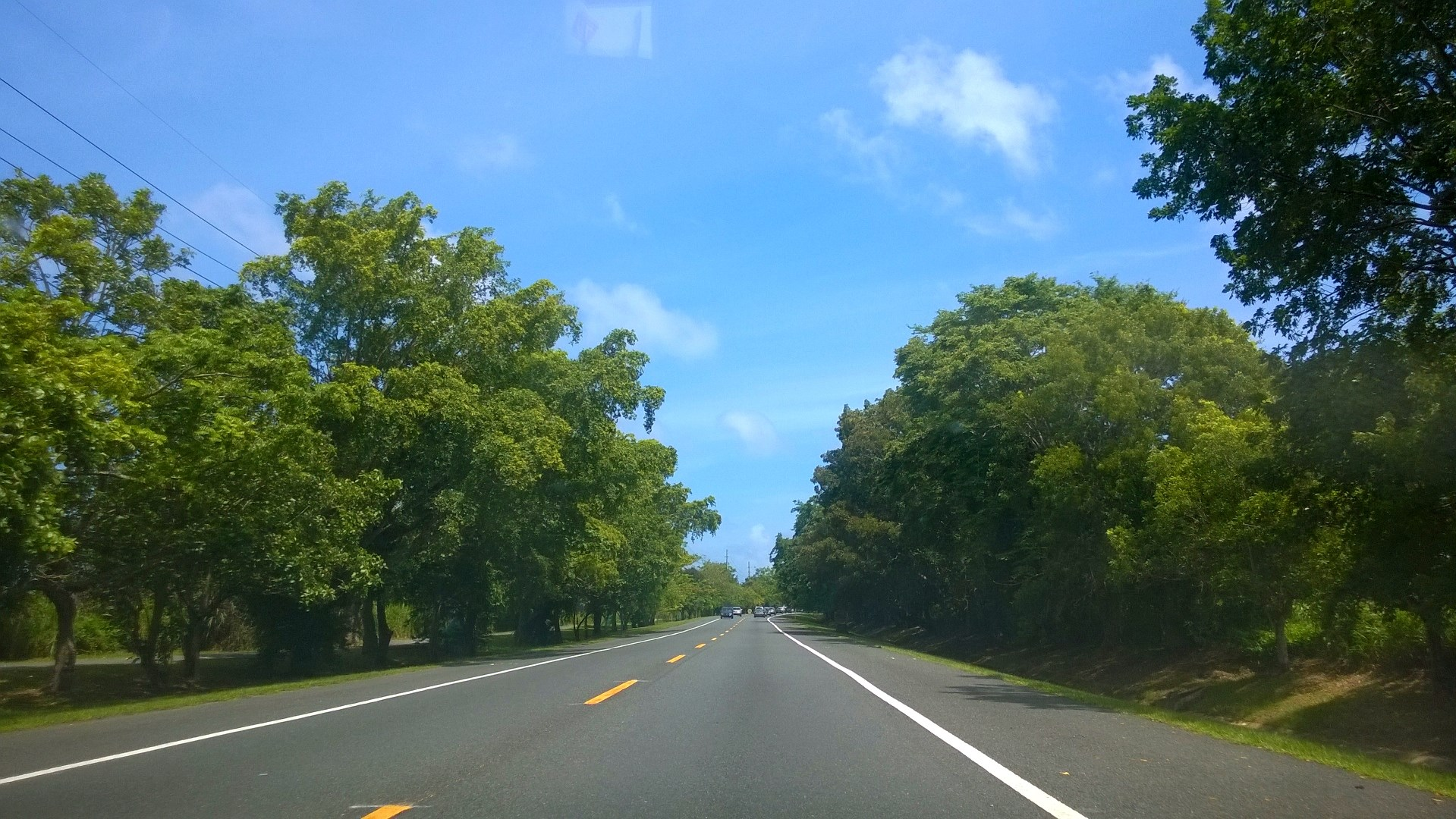
- Puerto Rico Highway 693 in Higuillar

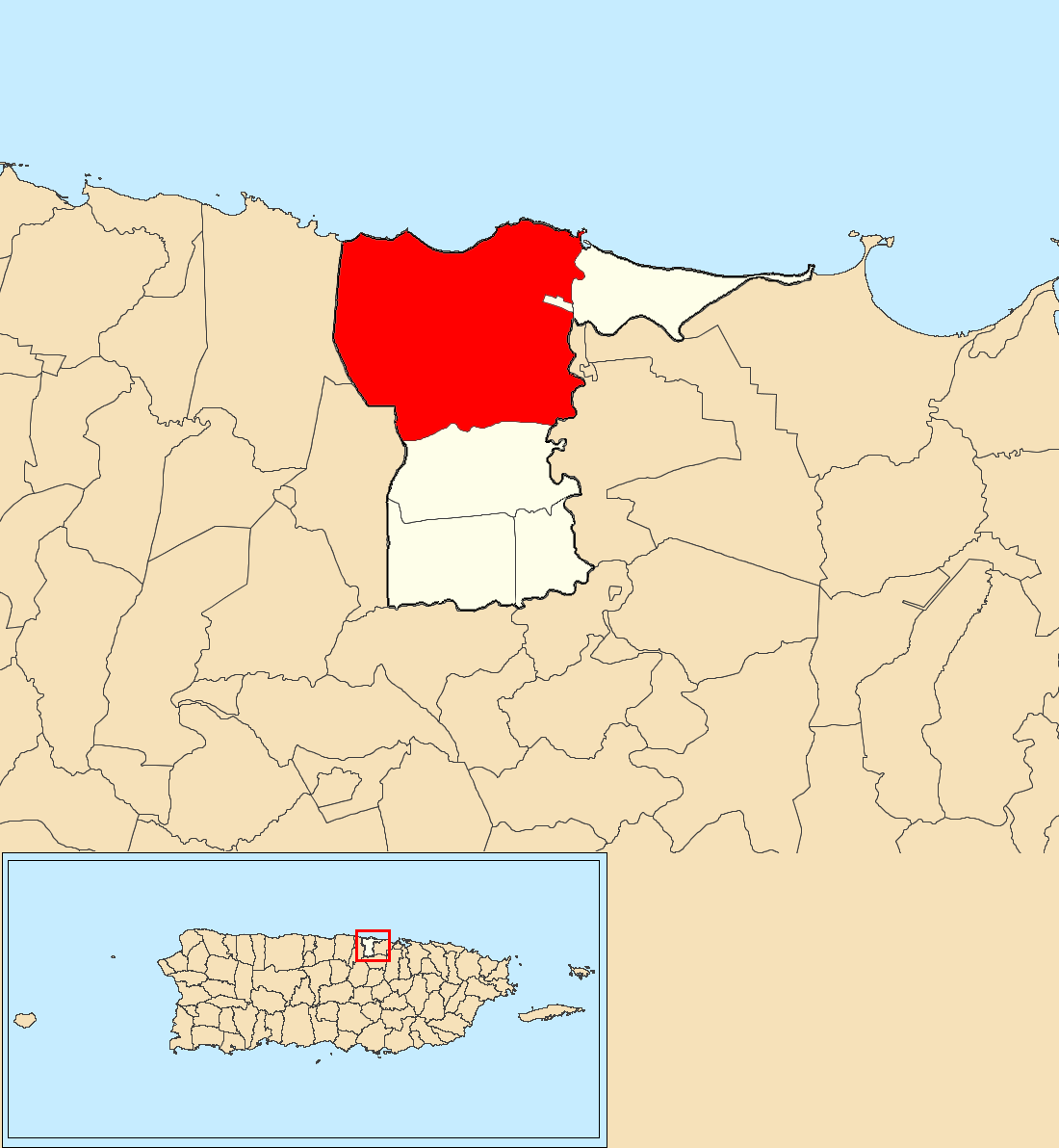
- Location of Higuillar within the municipality of Dorado shown in red

- Location of Puerto Rico
- Coordinates: 18°27′15″N 66°17′12″W
- Commonwealth: Puerto Rico
- Municipality: Dorado

Area
  - Total: 12.98 sq mi (33.6 km^{2})
  - Land: 11.80 sq mi (30.6 km^{2})
  - Water: 1.18 sq mi (3.1 km^{2})
- Elevation: 23 ft (7.0 m)

Population (2010)
  - Total: 25,785
  - Density: 2,188.9/sq mi (845.1/km^{2})
- Source: 2010 Census
- Time zone: UTC−4 (AST)
- ZIP Code: 00646

Higuillar is a barrio on the coast of the municipality of Dorado, Puerto Rico. Its population in 2010 was 25,785.

== History ==
Higuillar was in Spain's gazetteers until Puerto Rico was ceded by Spain in the aftermath of the Spanish–American War under the terms of the Treaty of Paris of 1898 and became an unincorporated territory of the United States. In 1899, the United States Department of War conducted a census of Puerto Rico finding that the population of Higuillar barrio was 820.

Historical population
Census	Pop.	Note	%±
1900	820		—
1910	1,166		42.2%
1920	1,375		17.9%
1930	1,572		14.3%
1940	2,604		65.6%
1950	3,814		46.5%
1960	5,710		49.7%
1970	0		−100.0%
1980	16,102		—
1990	20,117		24.9%
2000	22,481		11.8%
2010	25,785		14.7%
U.S. Decennial Census; 1899 (shown as 1900) 1910-1930; 1930-1950 1980-2000 2010

== Sectors ==
Barrios (which are, in contemporary times, roughly comparable to minor civil divisions) in turn are further subdivided into smaller local populated place areas/units called sectores (sectors in English). The types of sectores may vary, from normally sector to urbanización to reparto to barriada to residencial, among others.

The following sectors are in Higuillar barrio:

Apartamentos Brisas del Mar, Apartamentos Camino Dorado, Apartamentos Plantation Village Apartment 1, Apartamentos Plantation Village Apartment 2, Apartamentos Plantation Village Apartment 3, Apartamentos Villas de Costa Mar, Comunidad Mameyal, Condominio Costa Dorada, Condominio Fairway Village Apartments, Condominio Ocean Villas, Condominio Villa de Playa I y II, Condominio Villas de Dorado, Condominio Villas de Golf Este, Condominio Villas de Golf Oeste, Hogar Costa de Oro Village, PR-695, Reparto San Carlos, Sector Aldea, Sector Arenal, Sector Costa de Oro, Sector Cuatro Calles, Sector Hormigas, Sector La Poza, Sector La Prá, Sector Los Puertos, Sector Marismilla, Sector Monte Lindo, Sector San Antonio, Sector Santa Bárbara, Sector Sardinera, Sector Villa 2000, Sector Villa Palmas, Sector Villa Plata, Sector Villa Santa, Urbanización Brighton Country Club, Urbanización Dorado Beach Cottages, Urbanización Dorado Beach East, Urbanización Dorado Beach Estate, Urbanización Dorado Beach, Urbanización Dorado Country Estate, Urbanización Dorado Del Mar, Urbanización Dorado Reef, Urbanización Doraville, Urbanización Gable Breeze, Urbanización Hacienda Mi Querido Viejo, Urbanización Jardín Dorado, Urbanización Los Prados de Dorado Norte y Sur, Urbanización Monte Elena, Urbanización Paisajes de Dorado, Urbanización Paseo de Dorado, Urbanización Paseo del Mar, Urbanización Paseo del Sol, Urbanización Paseo Las Olas, Urbanización Paseo Las Palmas, Urbanización Paseo Los Corales, Urbanización Paseo Real, Urbanización Plantation Village, Urbanización Quintas de Dorado, Urbanización Ritz-Carlton Reserve East Beach, Urbanización Ritz-Carlton Reserve West Beach, Urbanización The Enclave, Urbanización The Greens, and Urbanización Villamar.

In Higuillar barrio is part of the Dorado urban zone. The San Antonio community is in Higuillar.

== Sites ==
The Balneario Manuel “Nolo” Morales or Sardinera beach is in Higuillar.

== Gallery ==
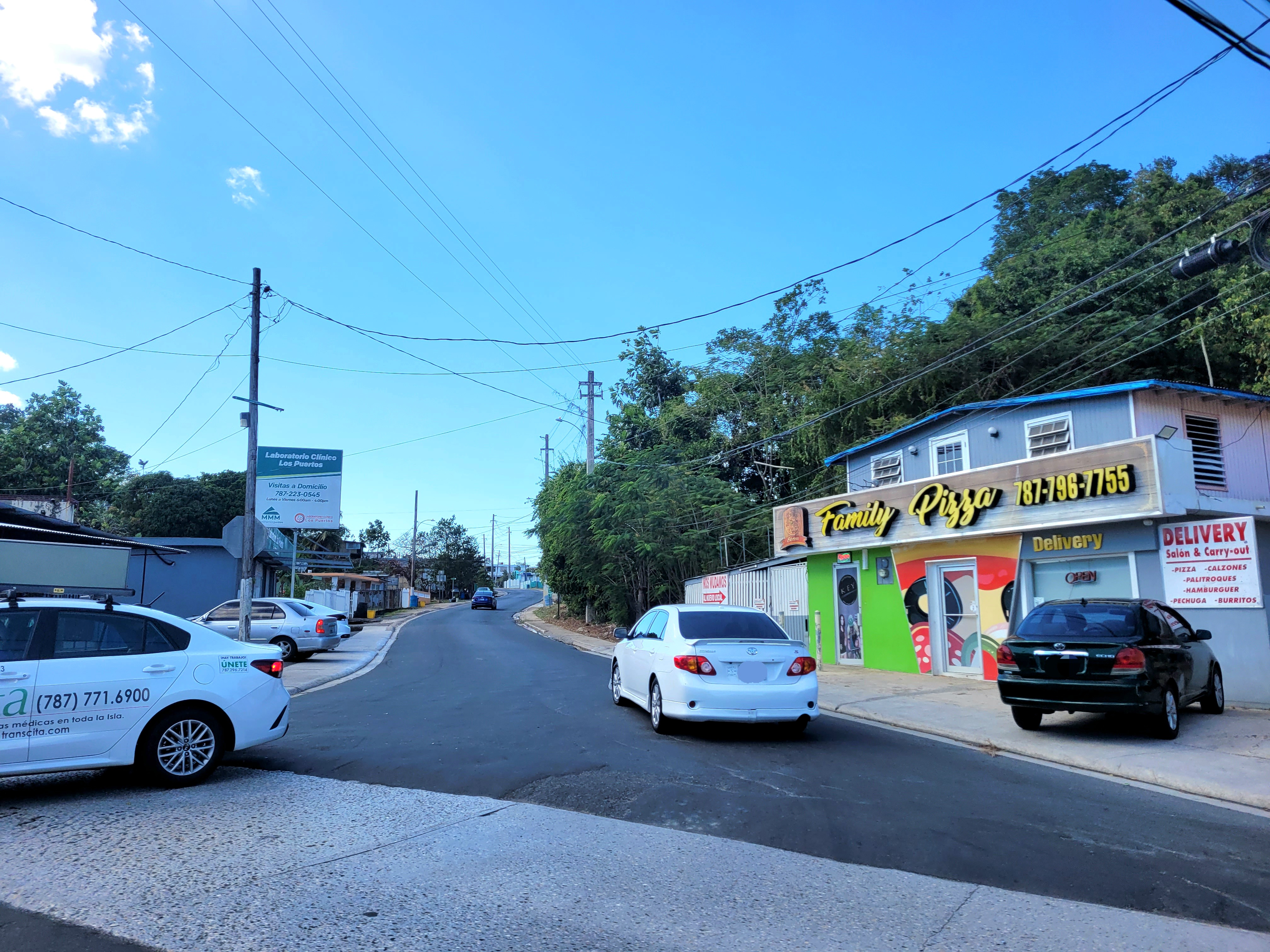
Puerto Rico Highway 691 in Higuillar

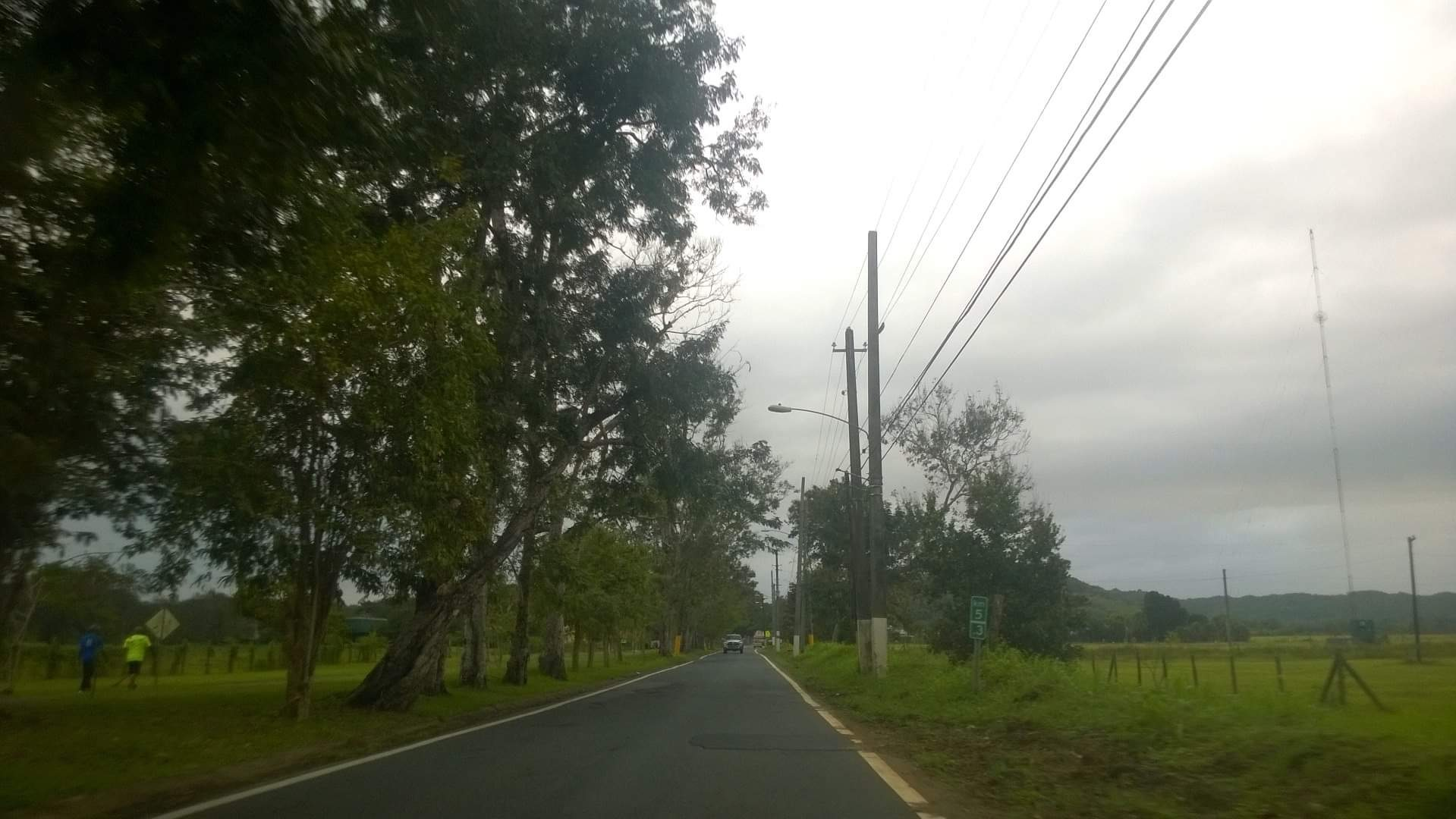
Puerto Rico Highway 694 between Higuillar and Maguayo

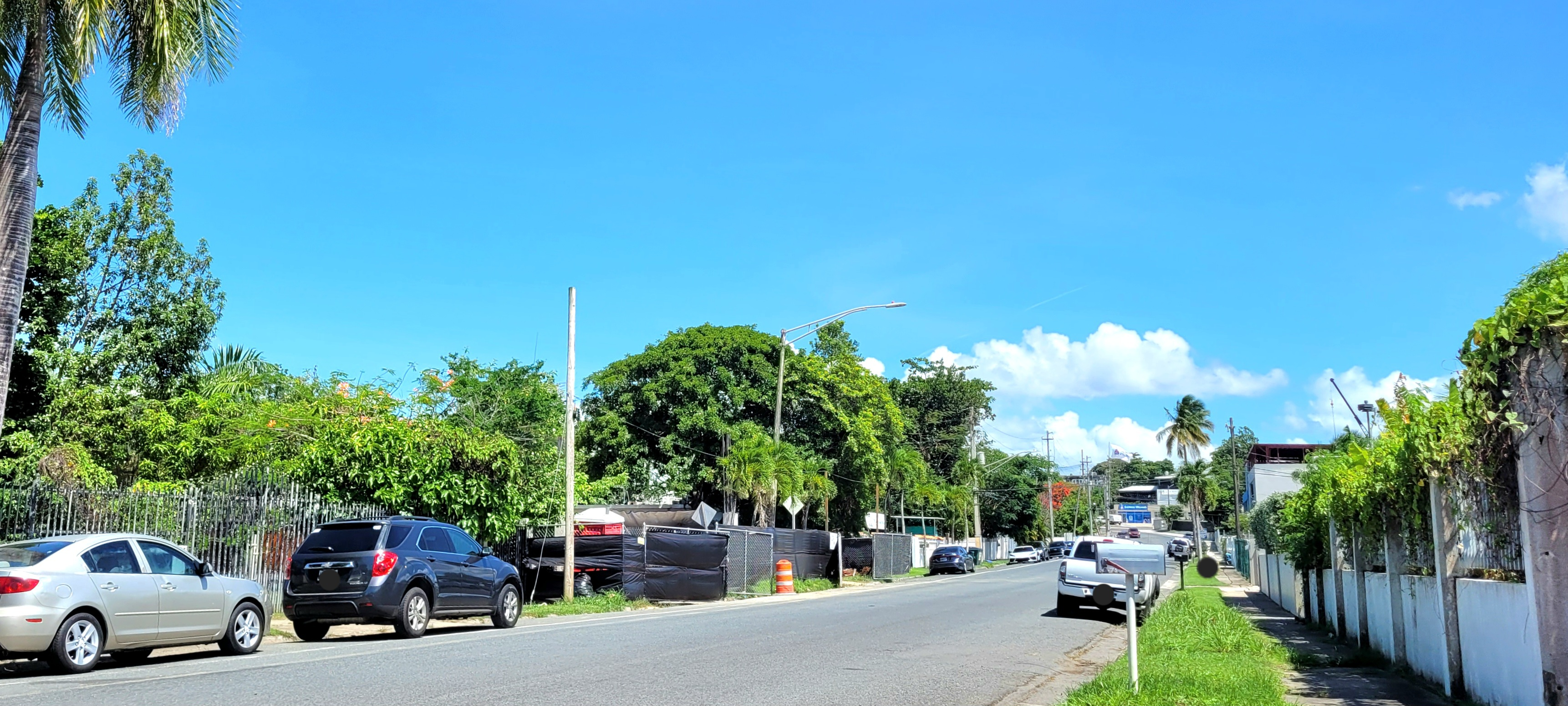
Puerto Rico Highway 697 near Sardinera Beach in Higuillar

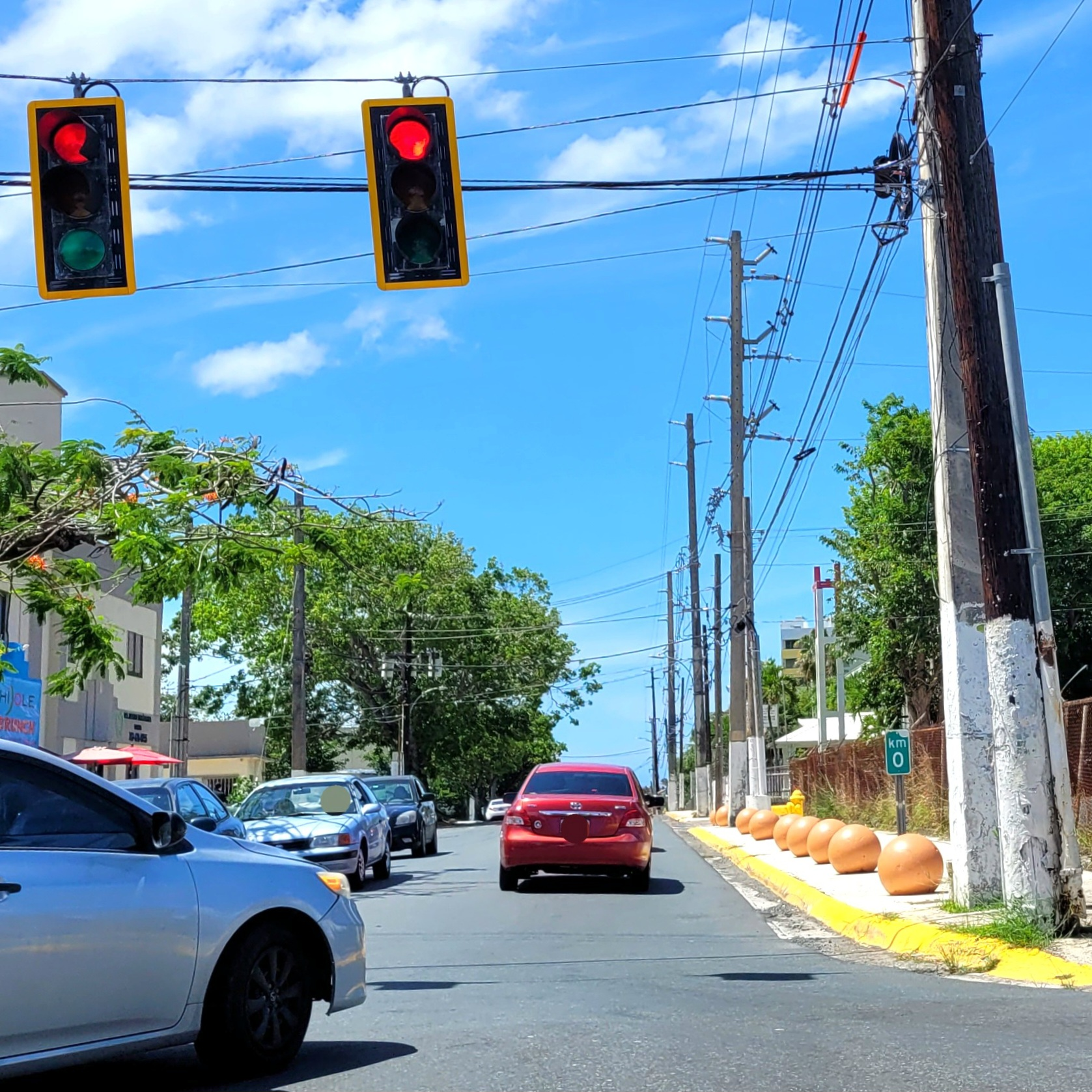
Puerto Rico Highway 698 in Higuillar

== See also ==
- List of communities in Puerto Rico
- List of barrios and sectors of Dorado, Puerto Rico
