= Old River =

Old River may refer to:

- Old River (Belize)
- Old River (Tasmania), Australia
- The Old River, in the Australian state of Victoria

In the United States:

- Old River (Clay County, Arkansas) a lake in Clay County, Arkansas
- Old River (Cross County, Arkansas) a lake in Cross County, Arkansas
- Old River (California)
- Old River (Florida)
- Old River (New Hampshire)

Places

- Old River, California
- Old River-Winfree in Chambers and Liberty Counties, Texas

Other

- Old River Control Structure, connecting the Red River to the Atchafalaya and Mississippi Rivers

== See also ==
- New River (disambiguation)
