= Novo River (Santa Catarina) =

Location
- Country: Brazil

Physical characteristics
- Source
  - location: Santa Catarina state
- Mouth: Itapoçu River
  - coordinates: 26°26′S 49°14′W

The Novo River is a river of Santa Catarina state in southeastern Brazil. It merges with the Humboldt River to form the Itapoçu River.

== See also ==
- List of rivers of Santa Catarina
