= San Antonio (Higuillar) =

Neighborhood of Dorado, Puerto Rico

- Community
- Interactive map of San Antonio
- Coordinates: 18°26′48″N 66°18′01″W
- Commonwealth: Puerto Rico
- Municipality: Dorado

Area
  - Total: 1.75 sq mi (4.5 km^{2})
  - Land: 1.74 sq mi (4.5 km^{2})
  - Water: .01 sq mi (0.026 km^{2})
- Elevation: 184 ft (56 m)

Population (2010)
  - Total: 7,574
  - Density: 4,352.9/sq mi (1,680.7/km^{2})
- Source: 2010 Census

San Antonio is a comunidad (community) in Higuillar which is one of the 6 barrios of Dorado, Puerto Rico.

== See also ==
- List of communities in Puerto Rico
