= Xinhe =

Xinhe may refer to the following locations in China:

== Counties ==
- Xinhe County, Hebei (新河县)
- Xinhe County, Xinjiang (新和县 - formerly Toqsu County)

== Communities ==
- Xinhe, Chengzhong, Chengzhong Subdistrict, Yingcheng, Xiaogan, Hubei

== Subdistricts ==
Written as "新合街道":

- Xinhe Subdistrict, Qitaihe, in Xinxing District, Qitaihe, Heilongjiang
- Xinhe Subdistrict, Xi'an, in Baqiao District

Written as "新河街道":

- Xinhe Subdistrict, Changsha, in Kaifu District
- Xinhe Subdistrict, Tianjin, in Binhai, Tianjin

== Towns ==
Written as "新和镇":

- Toksu, Xinjiang, or Xinhe, seat of Xinhe County, Xinjiang
- Xinhe, Guangxi, in Jiangzhou District, Chongzuo

Written as "新合镇"

- Xinhe, Jiangxi, in Jiujiang County
- Xinhe, Meihekou, Jilin

Written as "新河镇"

- Xinhe, Anhui, in Qingyang County
- Xinhe, Hebei, seat of Xinhe County
- Xinhe, Hubei, in Hanchuan
- Xinhe, Hengyang, in Changning City, Hunan
- Xinhe, Pizhou, Jiangsu
- Xinhe, Shuyang County, Jiangsu
- Xinhe, Shandong, in Pingdu
- Xinhe, Shanghai, in Chongming District
- Xinhe, Wenling, Zhejiang
- Shangxinhe, Nanjing

== Townships ==
Written as "新合乡":

- Xinhe Township, Jilin, in Antu County
- Xinhe Township, Zhejiang, in Tonglu County

Written as "新河乡":

- Xinhe, Huarong, a township of Huarong County, Hunan.
- Xinhe Township, Inner Mongolia, in Horqin Left Middle Banner

== Waterways ==
- A branch of Qinhuai River in Nanjing is known as Qinhuai Xinhe (秦淮新河）
