= Nuevo River (Puerto Rico) =

River of Puerto Rico

Coordinates: 18.4146701°N 66.2696129°W

Location
- Commonwealth: Puerto Rico

The Nuevo River is a river of Puerto Rico.

== See also ==
- List of rivers of Puerto Rico
