= Bajura, Vega Alta, Puerto Rico =

Barrio of Puerto Rico

Bajura
- Barrio
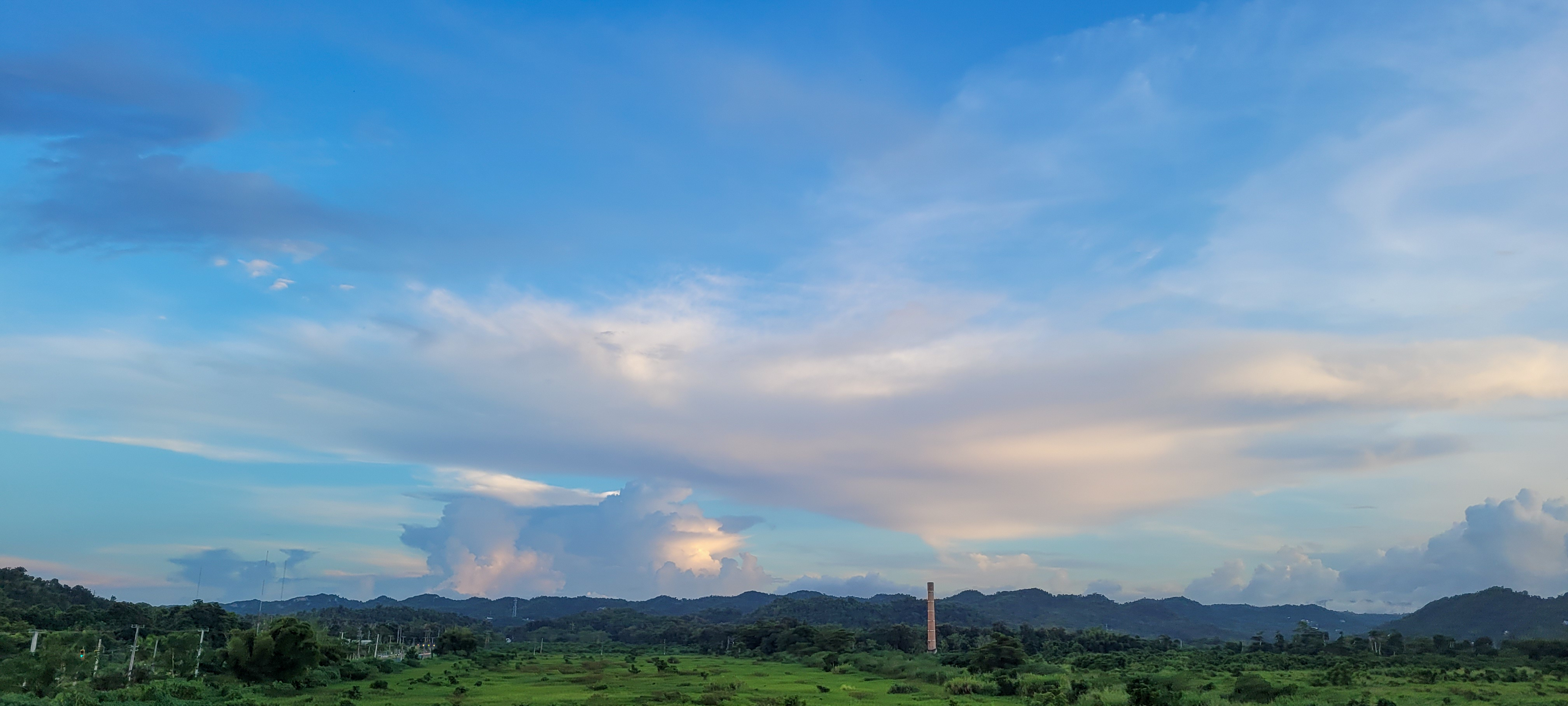
- Sunset from Bajura

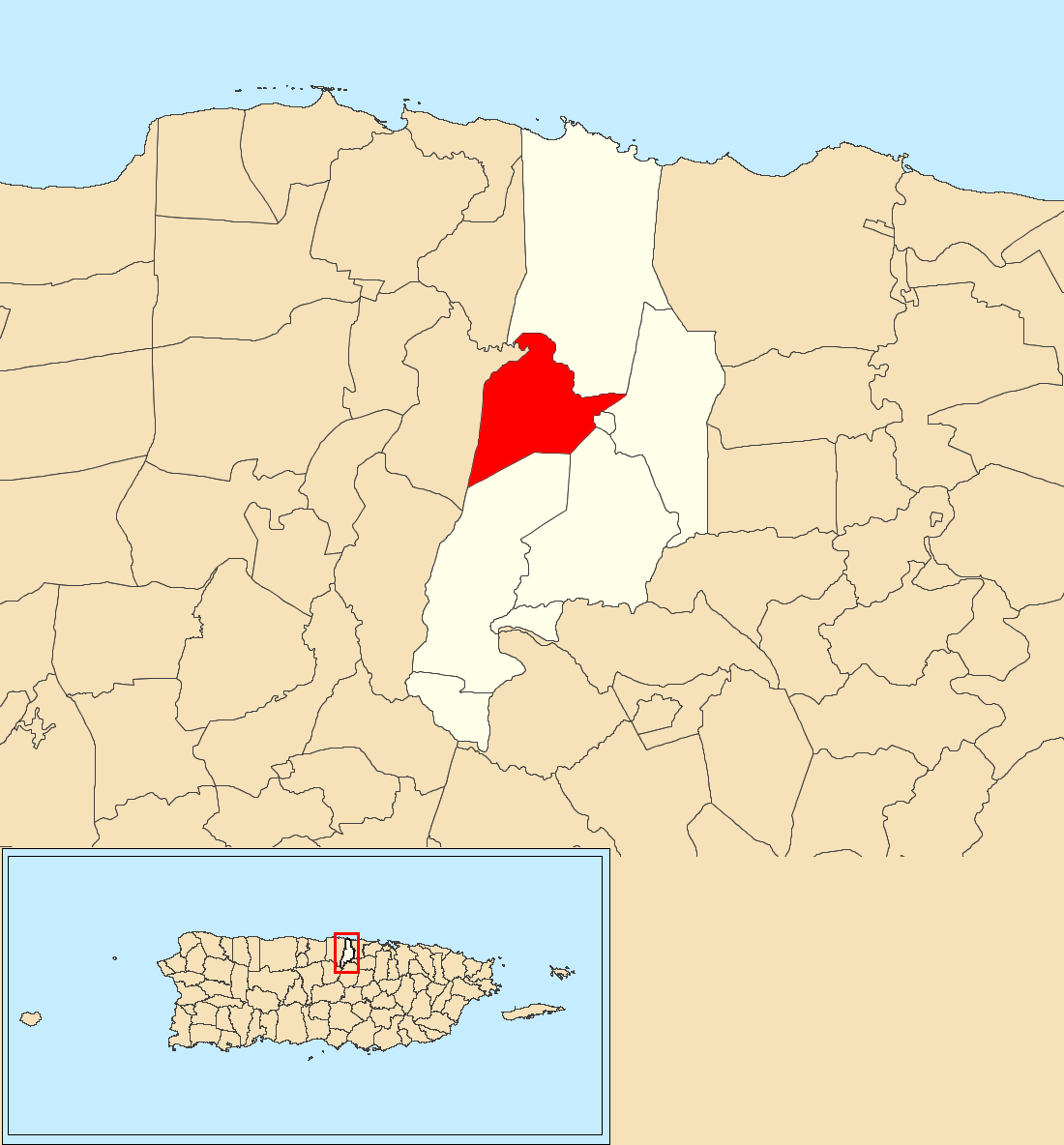
- Location of Bajura within the municipality of Vega Alta shown in red

- Location of Puerto Rico
- Coordinates: 18°24′52″N 66°20′49″W
- Commonwealth: Puerto Rico
- Municipality: Vega Alta

Area
  - Total: 3.09 sq mi (8.0 km^{2})
  - Land: 3.09 sq mi (8.0 km^{2})
  - Water: 0 sq mi (0 km^{2})
- Elevation: 46 ft (14 m)

Population (2010)
  - Total: 3,725
  - Density: 1,205.5/sq mi (465.4/km^{2})
- Source: 2010 Census
- Time zone: UTC−4 (AST)

Bajura is a barrio in the municipality of Vega Alta, Puerto Rico. Its population in 2010 was 3,725.

== History ==
Bajura was in Spain's gazetteers until Puerto Rico was ceded by Spain in the aftermath of the Spanish–American War under the terms of the Treaty of Paris of 1898 and became an unincorporated territory of the United States. In 1899, the United States Department of War conducted a census of Puerto Rico finding that the population of Bajura barrio was 749.

Historical population
Census	Pop.	Note	%±
1900	749		—
1910	1,045		39.5%
1920	1,100		5.3%
1930	1,619		47.2%
1940	1,820		12.4%
1950	2,197		20.7%
1960	2,566		16.8%
1970	0		−100.0%
1980	3,415		—
1990	4,171		22.1%
2000	4,394		5.3%
2010	3,725		−15.2%
U.S. Decennial Census; 1899 (shown as 1900) 1910-1930; 1930-1950 1960 1980-2000 2010

== Gallery ==
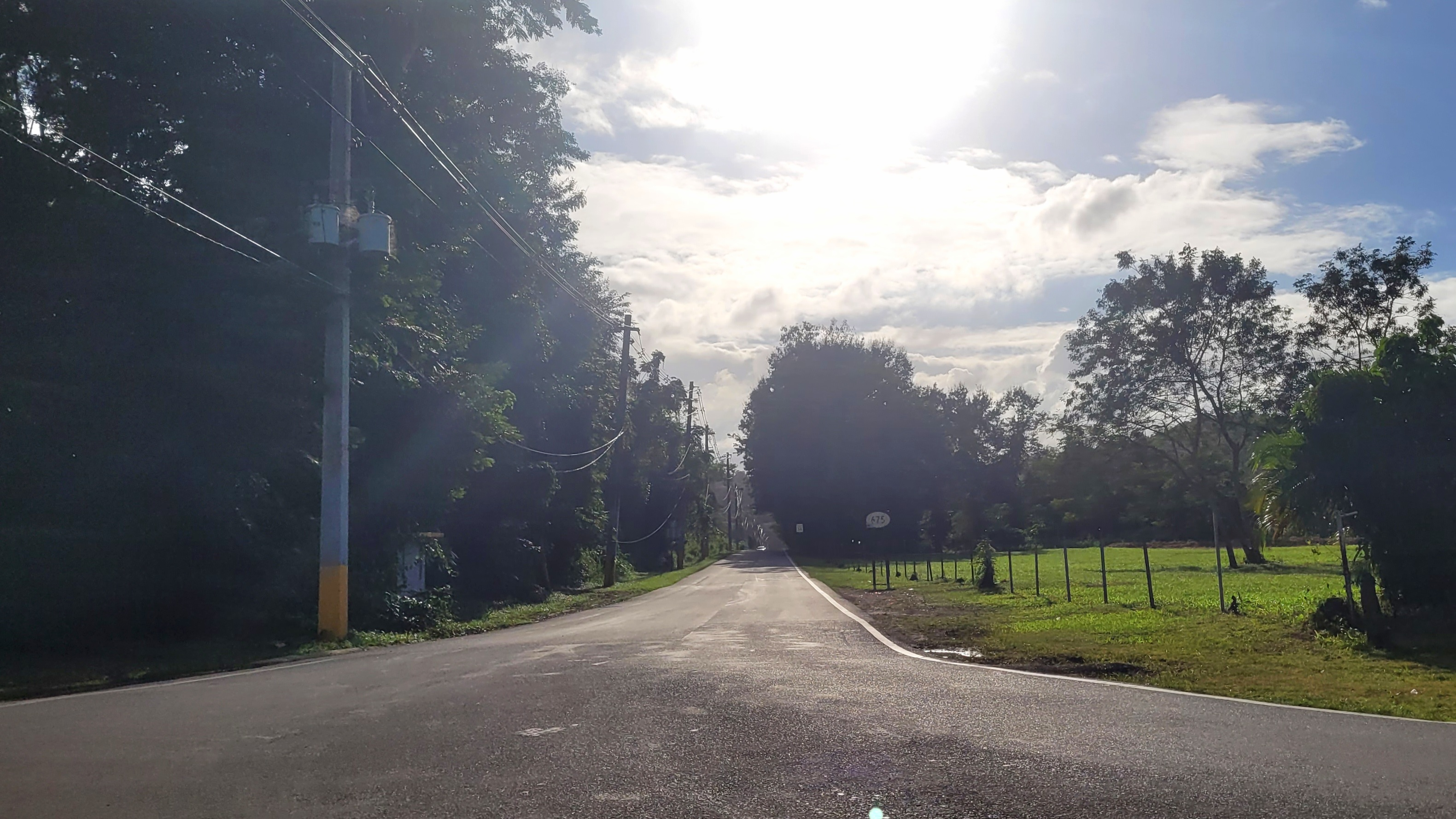
Puerto Rico Highway 675 in Bajura

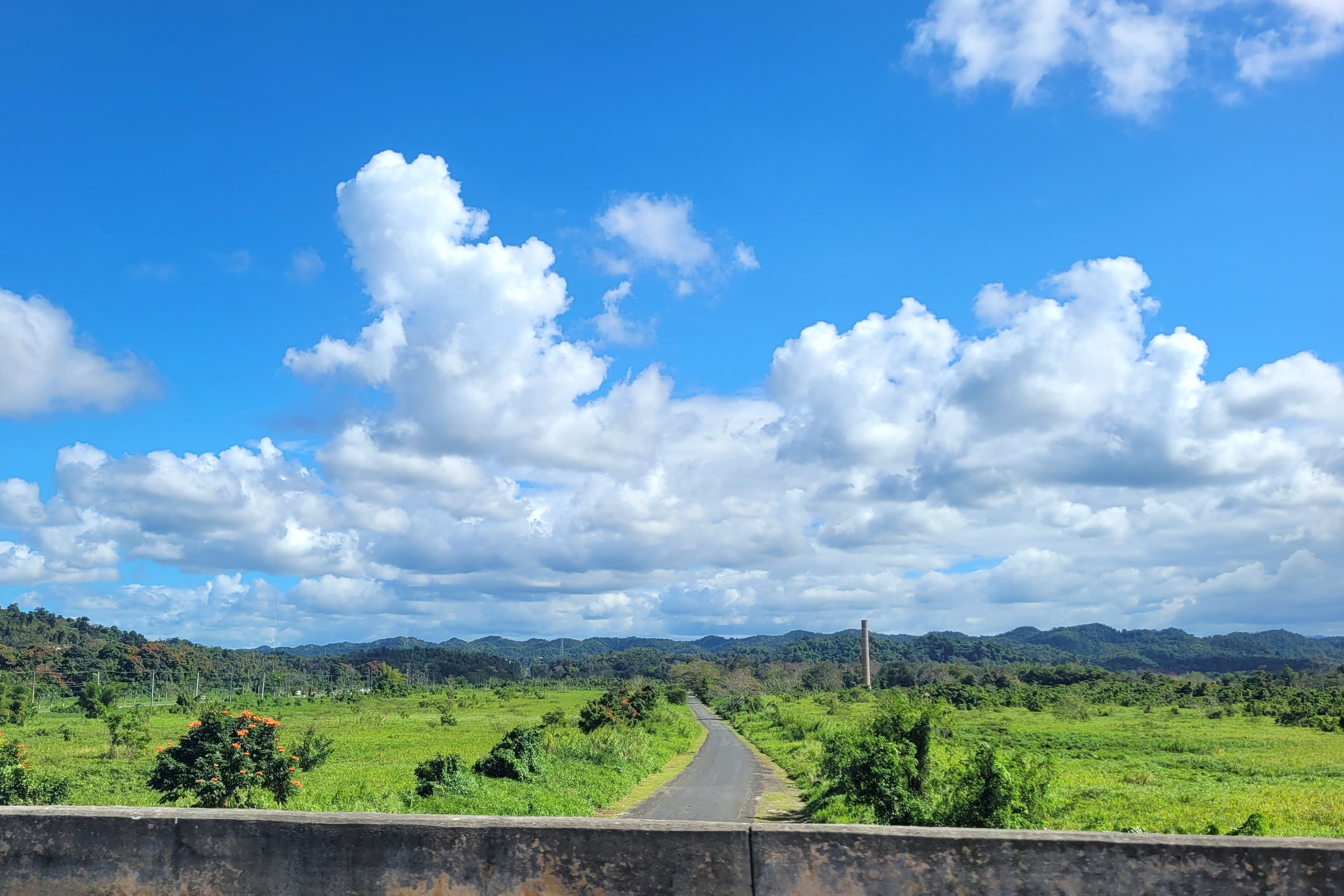
Puerto Rico Highway 676 in Bajura

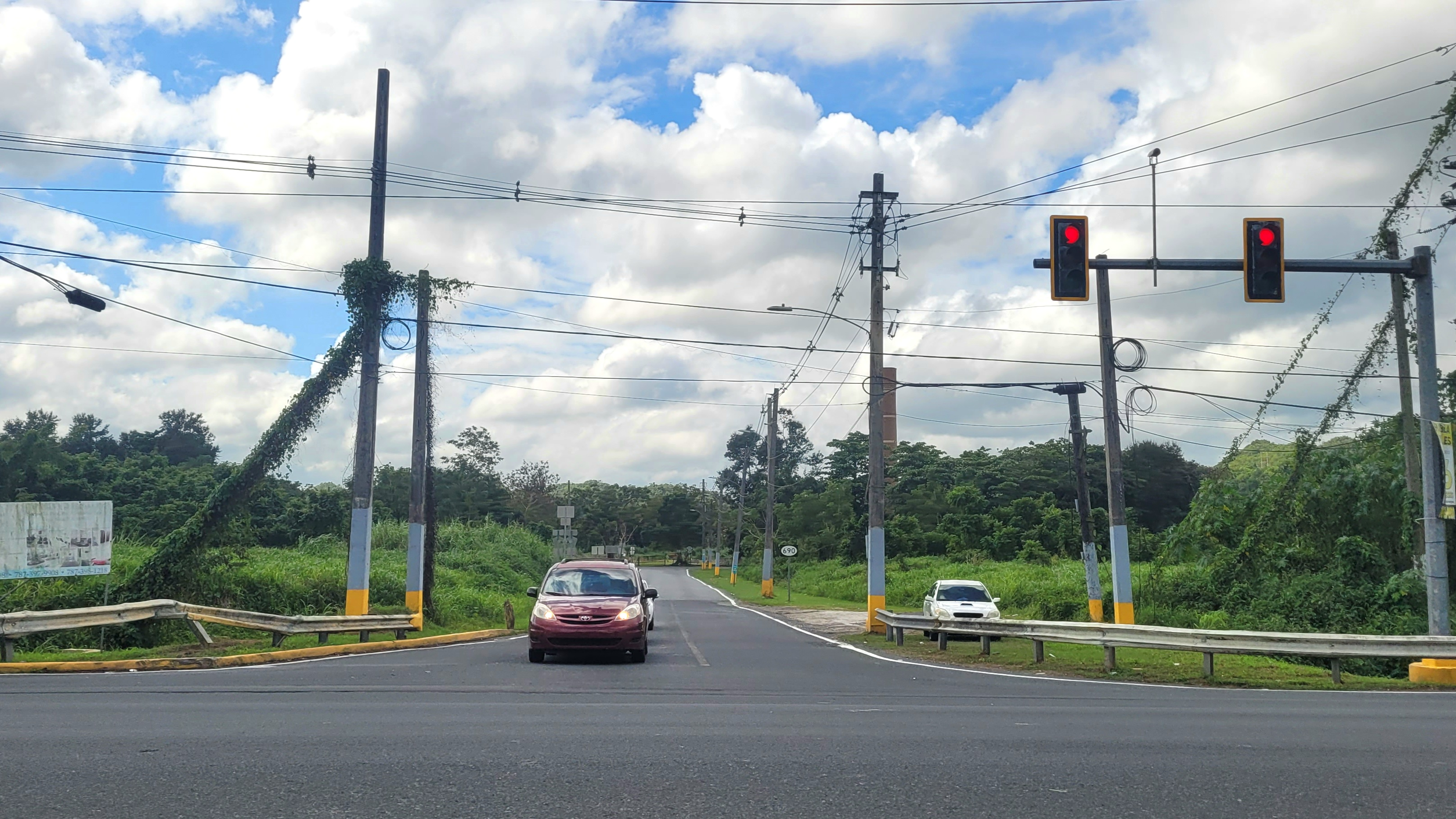
Puerto Rico Highway 690 in Bajura

== See also ==
- List of communities in Puerto Rico
