= Puerto Rico Highway 690 =

Highway in Puerto Rico

Highway 690
- Ruta 690

Route information
- Maintained by Puerto Rico DTPW
- Length: 7.6 km (4.7 mi)
- Existed: 1953–present

Major junctions
- South end: PR-676 in Bajura
- PR-2 in Bajura; PR-22 in Sabana; PR-691 in Sabana; PR-689 in Sabana; PR-688 in Sabana; PR-693 in Sabana; PR-692 in Sabana; PR-6690 in Sabana
- North end: Calle Principal in Sabana

Location
- Country: United States
- Territory: Puerto Rico
- Municipalities: Vega Alta

Highway system
- Roads in Puerto Rico; List
← PR-679	→ PR-693
← PR-6685	PR-6690	→ PR-6693

Puerto Rico Highway 690 (PR-690) is a north–south road located entirely in the municipality of Vega Alta, Puerto Rico. With a length of 7.6 kilometers (4.7 mi), it begins at its junction with PR-676 in Bajura barrio and ends at Cerro Gordo Beach in Sabana barrio.

Puerto Rico Highway 690

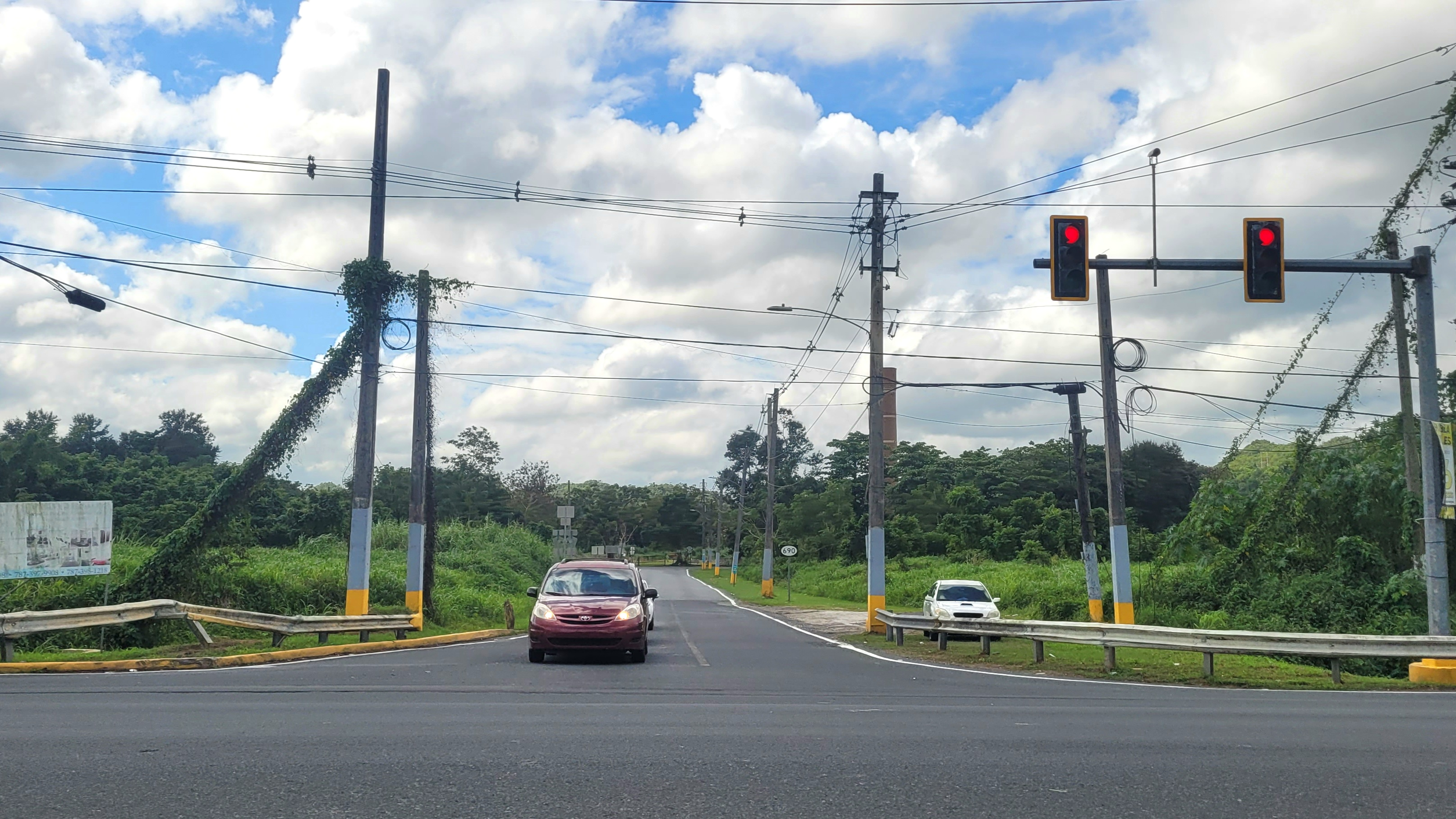
Heading south in Bajura barrio

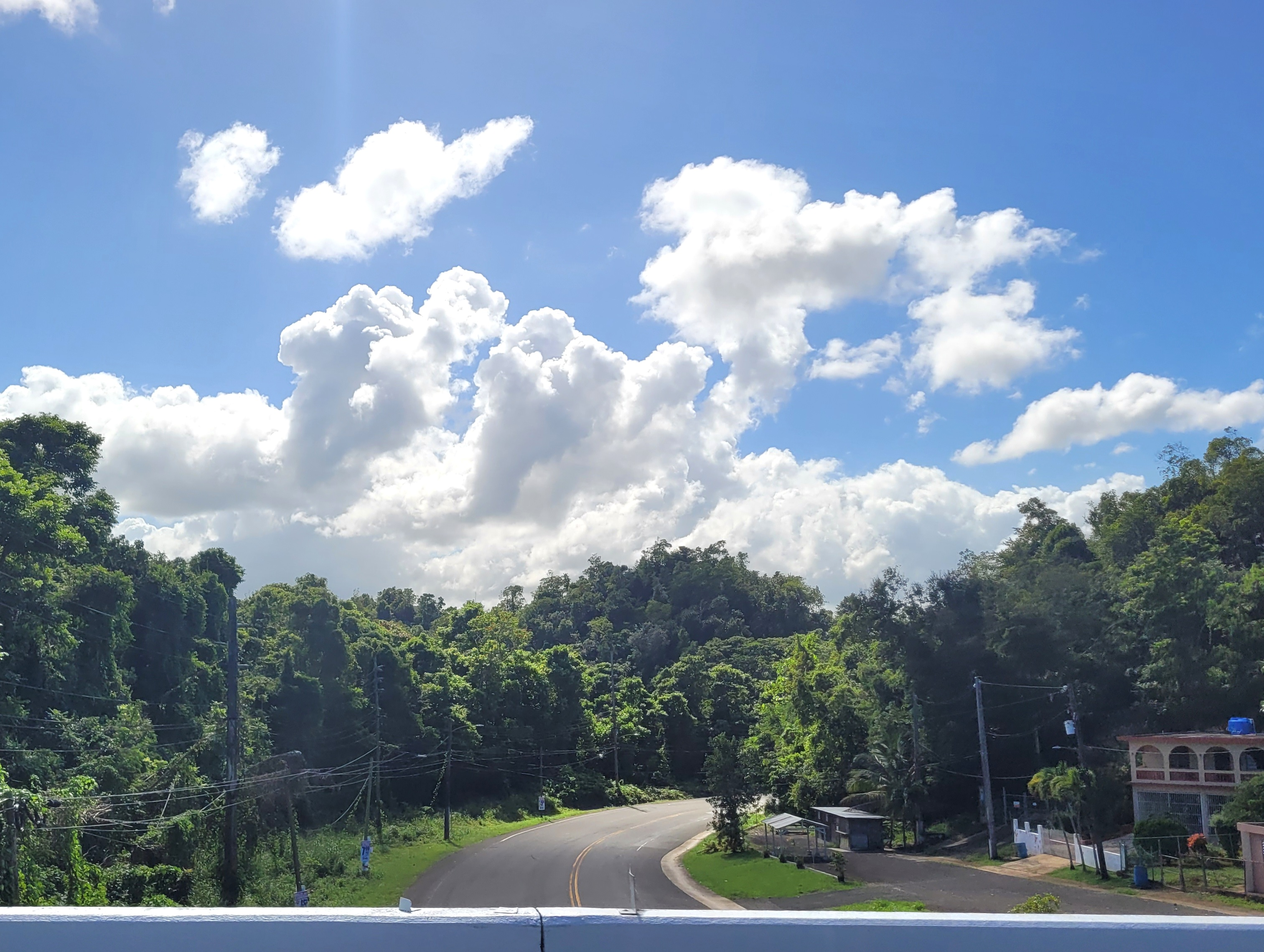
Heading south in Sabana barrio

== Major intersections ==
The entire route is located in Vega Alta.

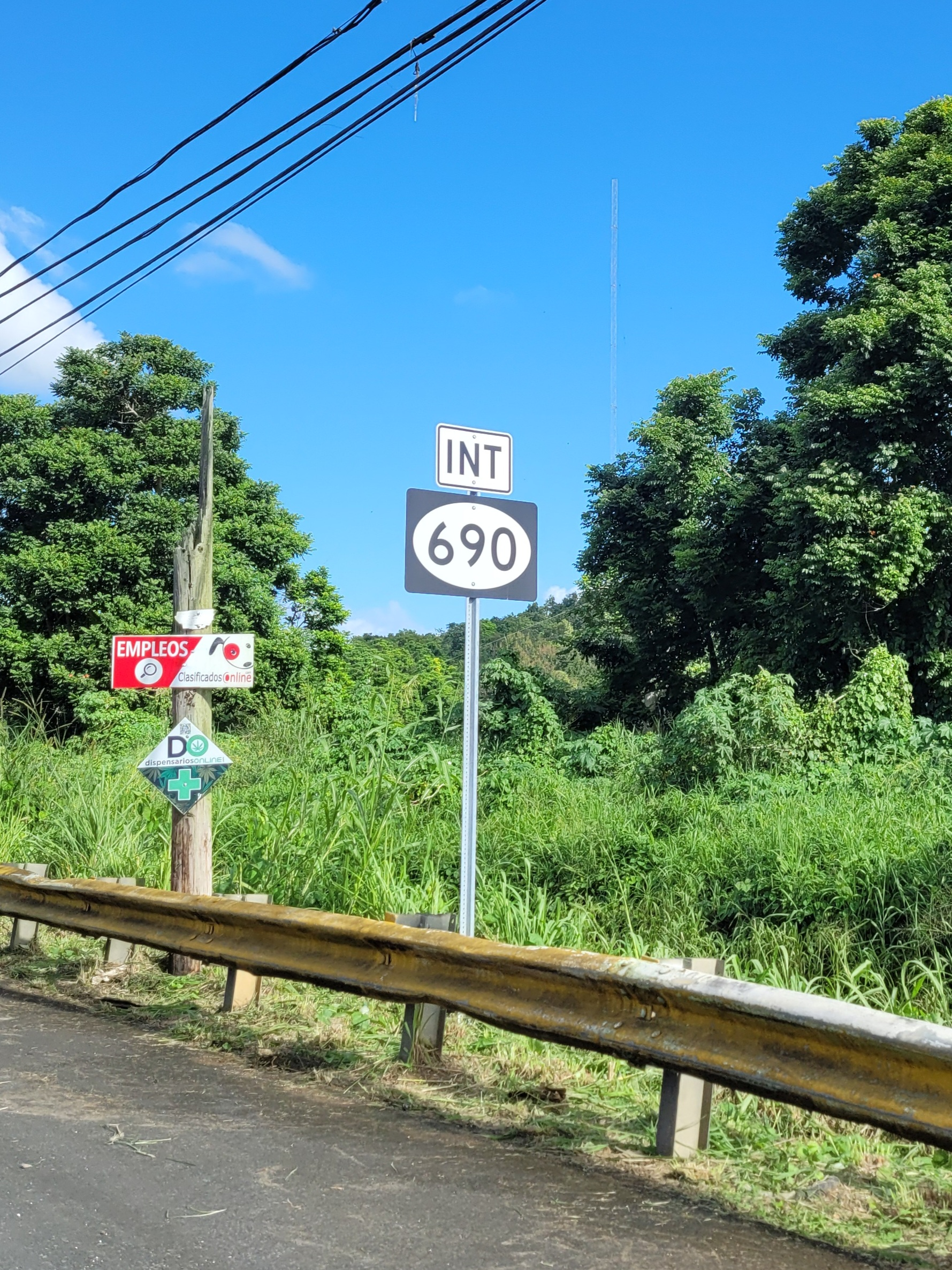
PR-2 west near PR-690 junction in Bajura barrio

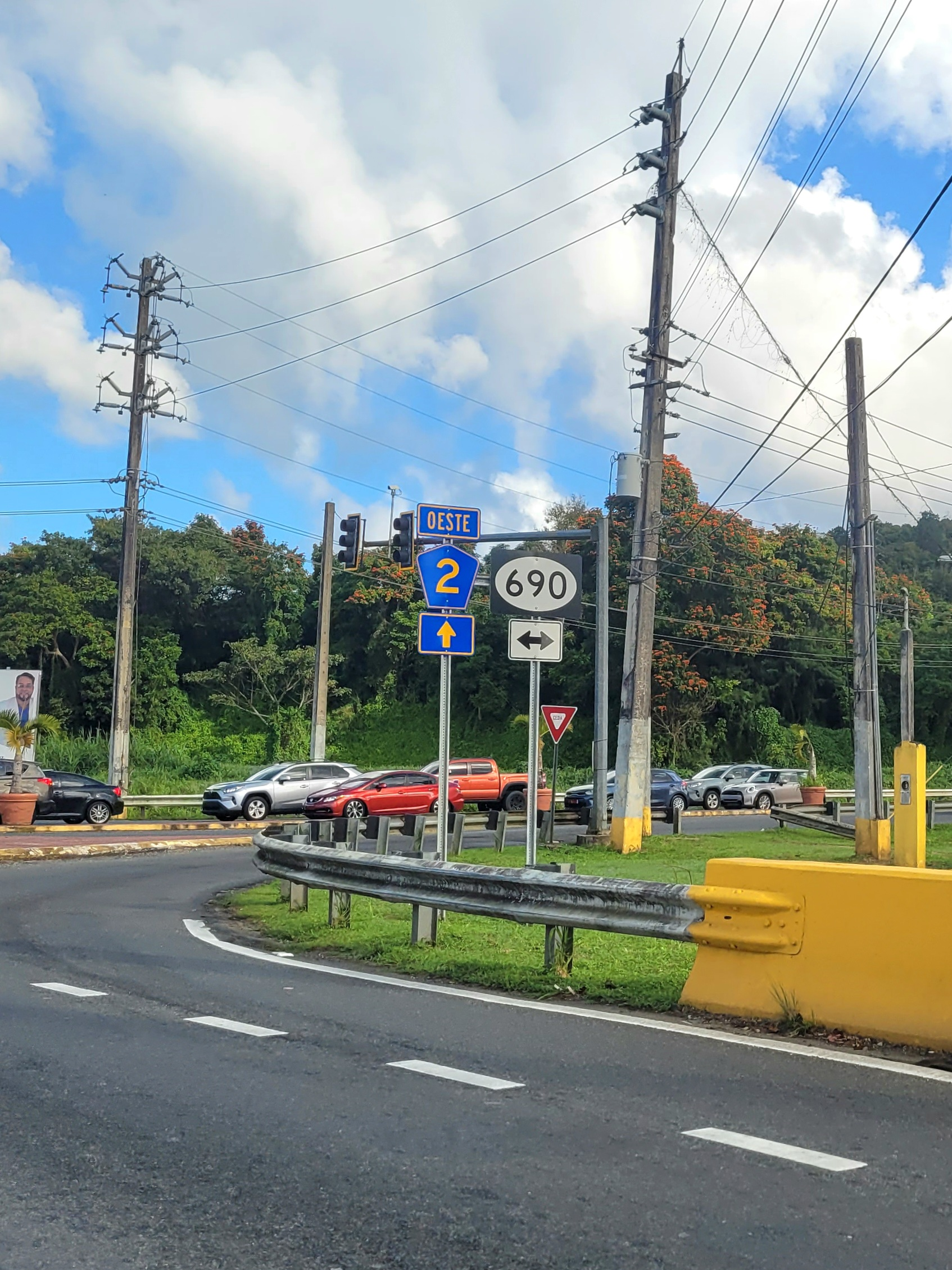
PR-2 west at PR-690 junction in Bajura barrio

Location	km	mi	Destinations	Notes
Bajura	0.0	0.0	PR-676 – Vega Alta, Vega Baja	Southern terminus of PR-690
Bajura	0.2	0.12	PR-2 – San Juan, Arecibo	
Sabana	1.1	0.68	PR-22 (Autopista José de Diego) – Vega Alta	PR-22 exit 31; one-way ramp; PR-22 access via PR-2 west
Sabana	2.2– 2.3	1.4– 1.4	PR-691 – Higuillar	
Sabana	4.4	2.7	PR-689 – Vega Baja	
Sabana	5.2– 5.3	3.2– 3.3	PR-688 – Vega Baja	
Sabana	5.9	3.7	PR-693 – Dorado	
Sabana	6.0	3.7	PR-692 – Sabana	
Sabana	7.2	4.5	PR-6690 – Sabana	
Sabana	7.6	4.7	PR-Calle Principal – Sabana	Northern terminus of PR-690
1.000 mi = 1.609 km; 1.000 km = 0.621 mi: Incomplete access

== Related route ==
Highway 6690
- Location: Vega Alta
- Length: 2.7 km (1.7 mi)

Puerto Rico Highway 6690 (PR-6690) is a spur route that goes to PR-693 from PR-690 near Cerro Gordo Beach. The entire route is located in Sabana, Vega Alta.

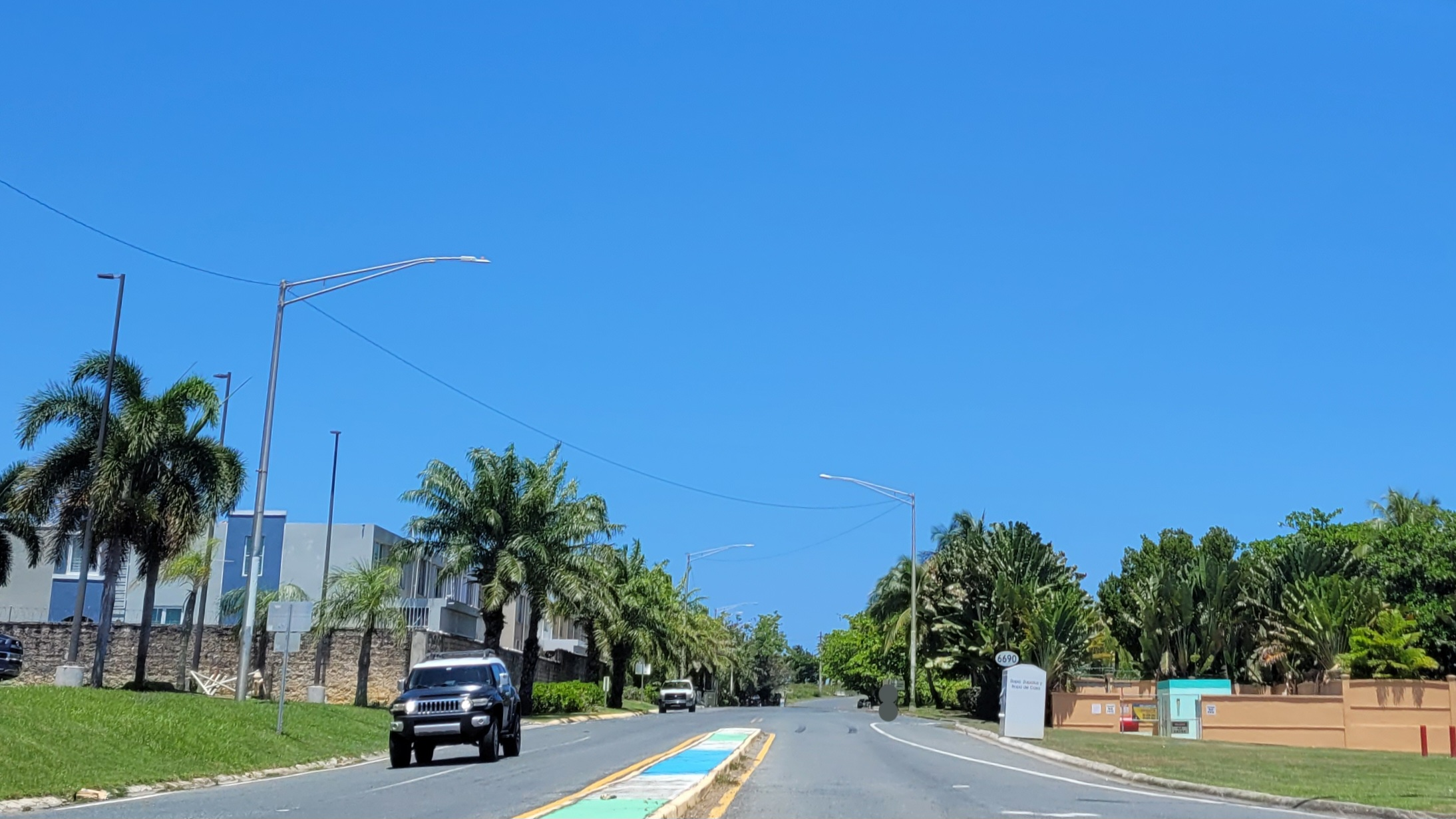
Southern terminus of PR-6690

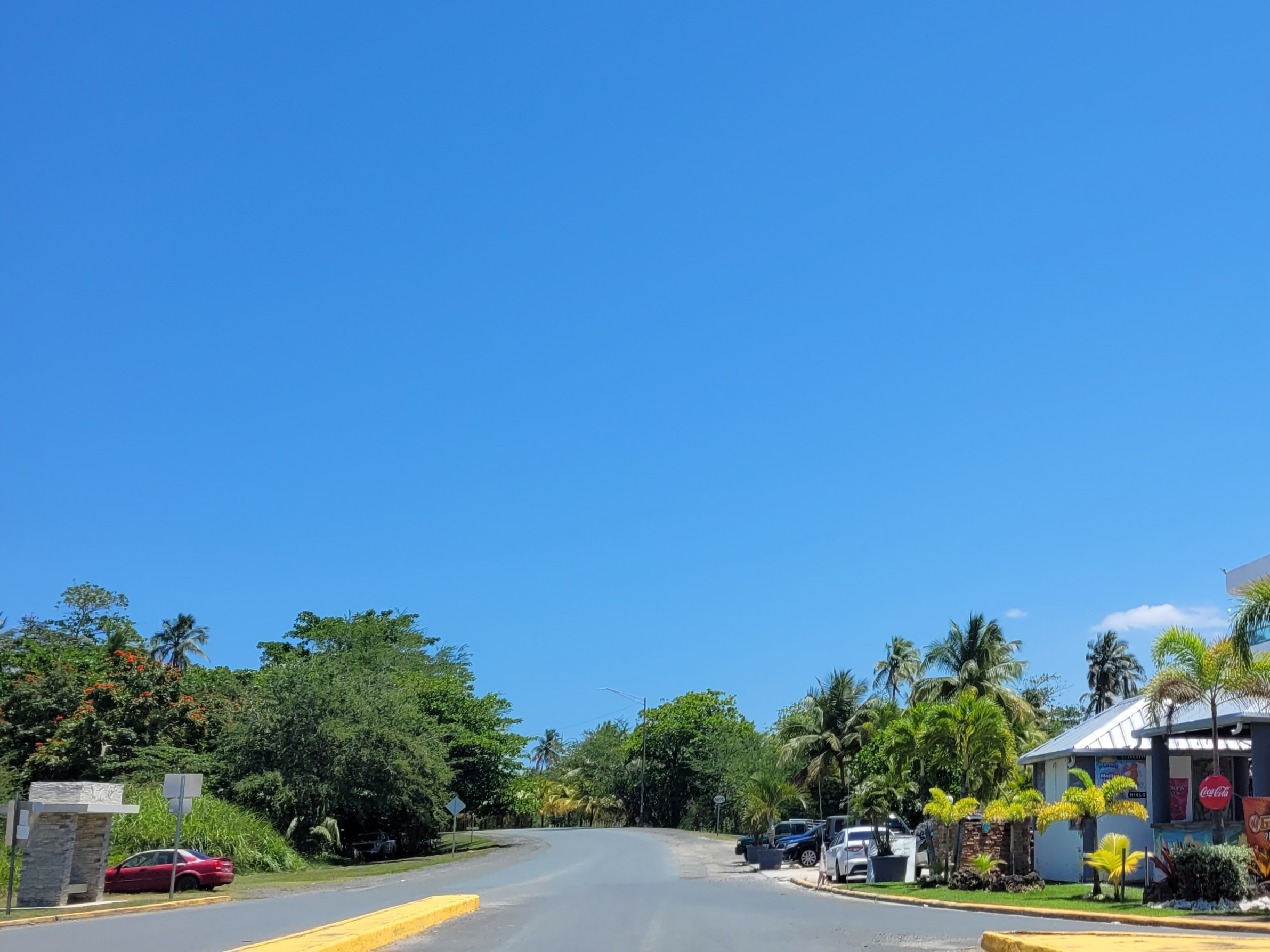
Northern terminus of PR-6690

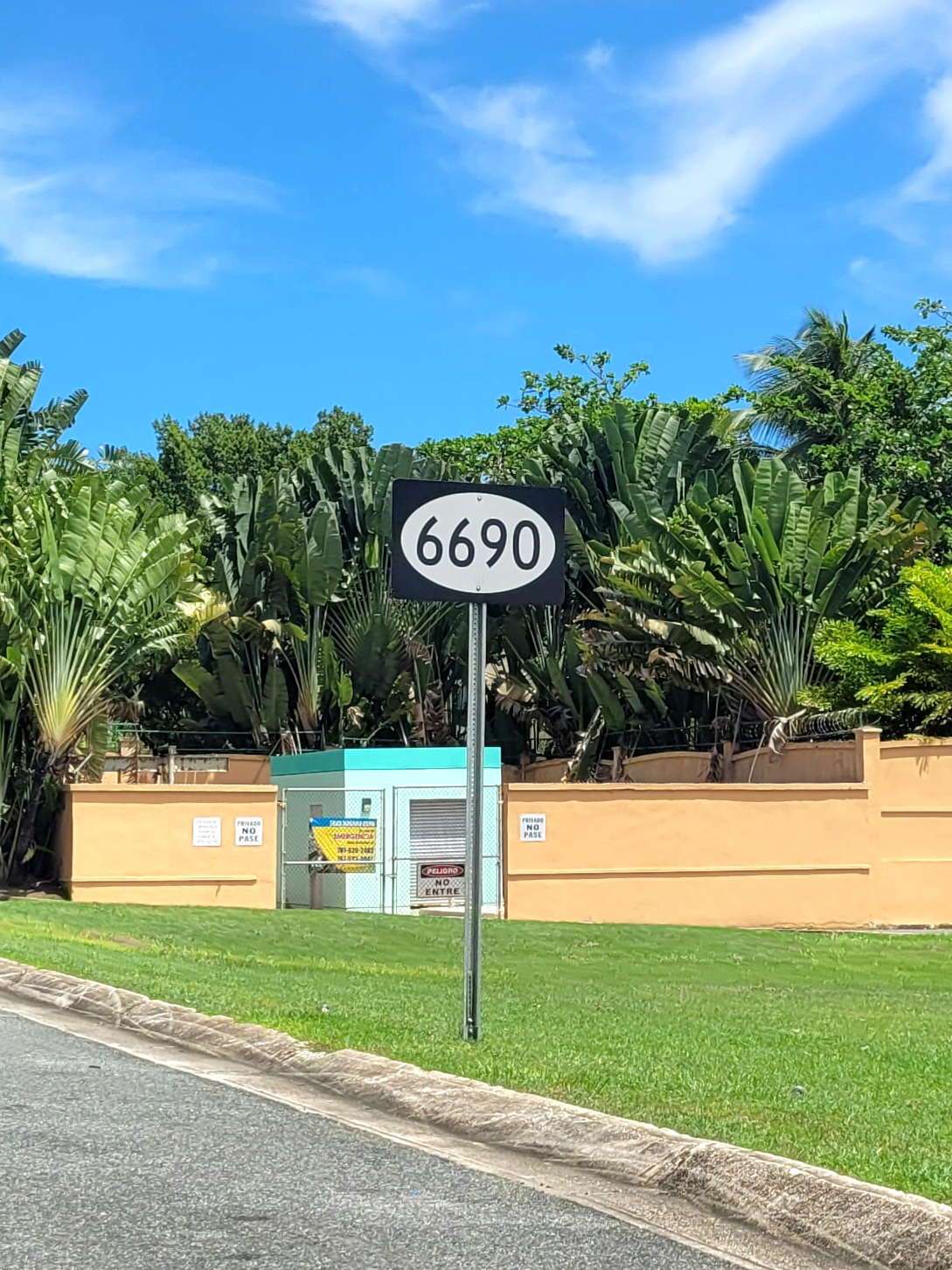
Northbound sign for PR-6690

km	mi	Destinations	Notes
0.0	0.0	PR-693 – Dorado, Vega Alta	Southern terminus of PR-6690
2.7	1.7	PR-690 – Vega Alta	Northern terminus of PR-6690
1.000 mi = 1.609 km; 1.000 km = 0.621 mi

== See also ==
- 1953 Puerto Rico highway renumbering
