= Sabana, Vega Alta, Puerto Rico =

Barrio of Puerto Rico

Sabana
- Barrio
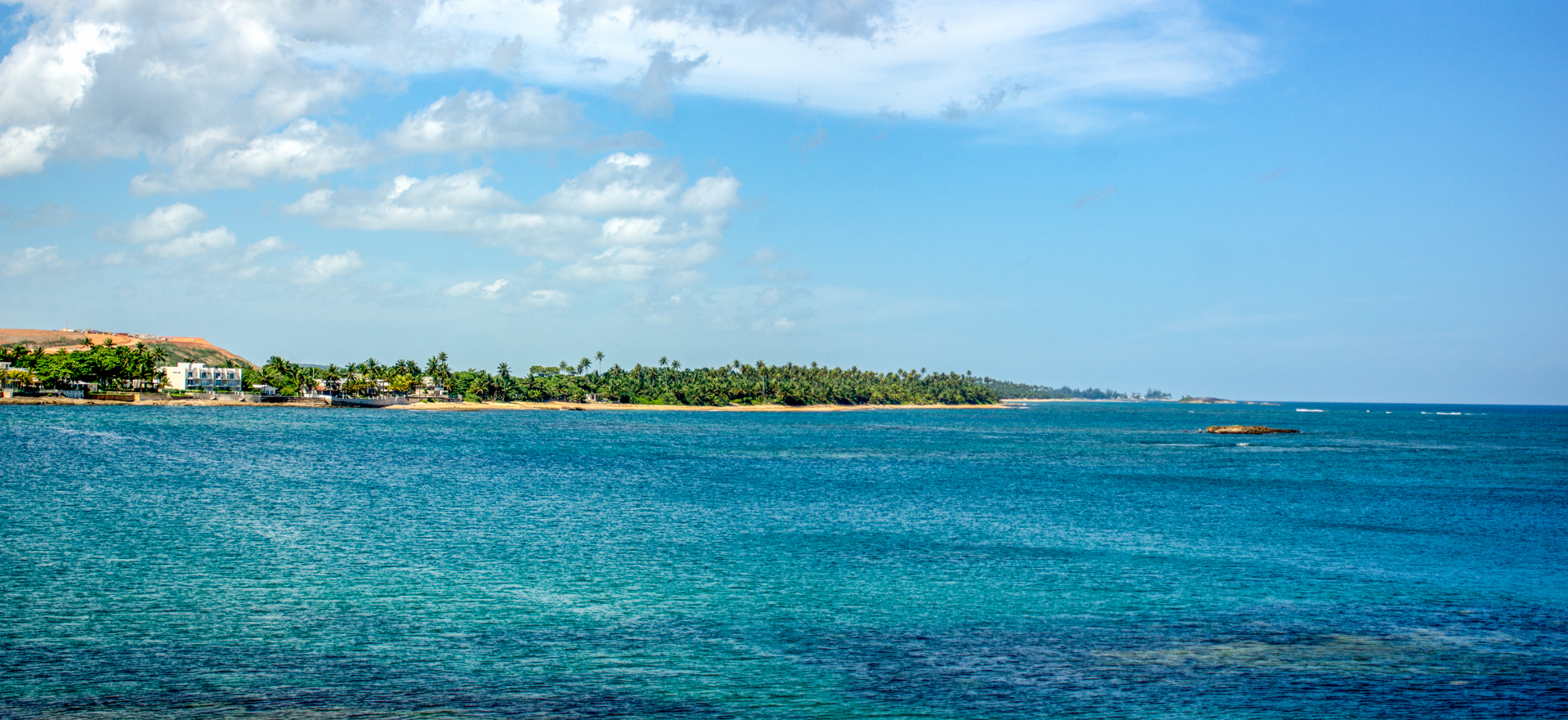
- Breñas Beach in Sabana

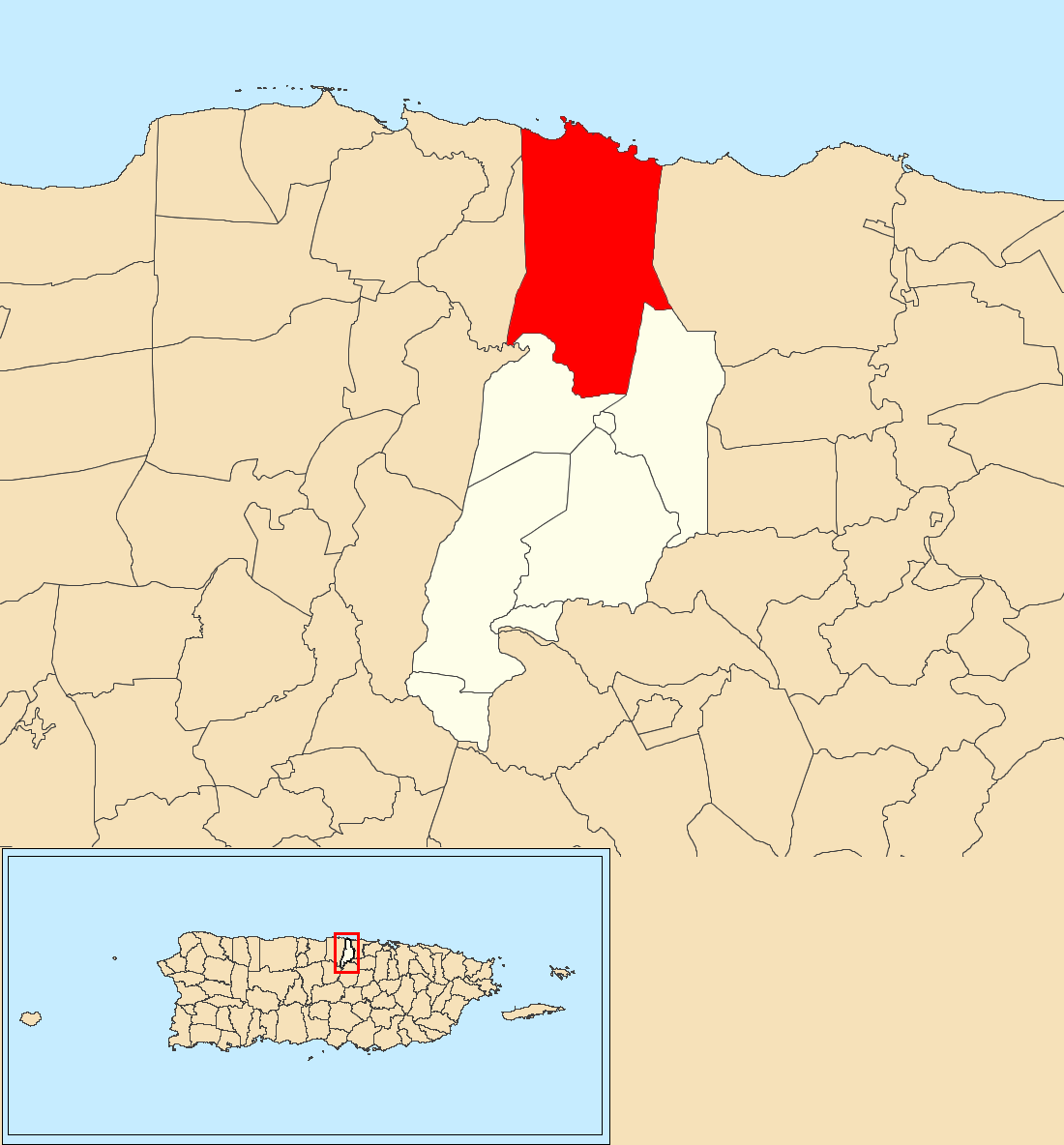
- Location of Sabana within the municipality of Vega Alta shown in red

- Location of Puerto Rico
- Coordinates: 18°27′16″N 66°19′36″W
- Commonwealth: Puerto Rico
- Municipality: Vega Alta

Area
  - Total: 9.10 sq mi (23.6 km^{2})
  - Land: 8.33 sq mi (21.6 km^{2})
  - Water: 0.77 sq mi (2.0 km^{2})
- Elevation: 3 ft (0.91 m)

Population (2010)
  - Total: 15,164
  - Density: 1,820.4/sq mi (702.9/km^{2})
- Source: 2010 Census
- Time zone: UTC−4 (AST)

Sabana is a barrio in the municipality of Vega Alta, Puerto Rico. Its population in 2010 was 15,164.

== History ==
Sabana was in Spain's gazetteers until Puerto Rico was ceded by Spain in the aftermath of the Spanish–American War under the terms of the Treaty of Paris of 1898 and became an unincorporated territory of the United States. In 1899, the United States Department of War conducted a census of Puerto Rico finding that the population of Sabana barrio was 910.

Sabana saw a 21.7% increase in population from 1990 to 2000 and a 23.3% increase from 2000 to 2010.

Historical population
Census	Pop.	Note	%±
1900	910		—
1910	1,059		16.4%
1920	1,423		34.4%
1930	1,871		31.5%
1940	2,531		35.3%
1950	3,013		19.0%
1960	4,208		39.7%
1970	6,627		57.5%
1980	9,072		36.9%
1990	10,108		11.4%
2000	12,300		21.7%
2010	15,164		23.3%
U.S. Decennial Census; 1899 (shown as 1900) 1910-1930; 1930-1950 1960 1980-2000 2010

== Gallery ==
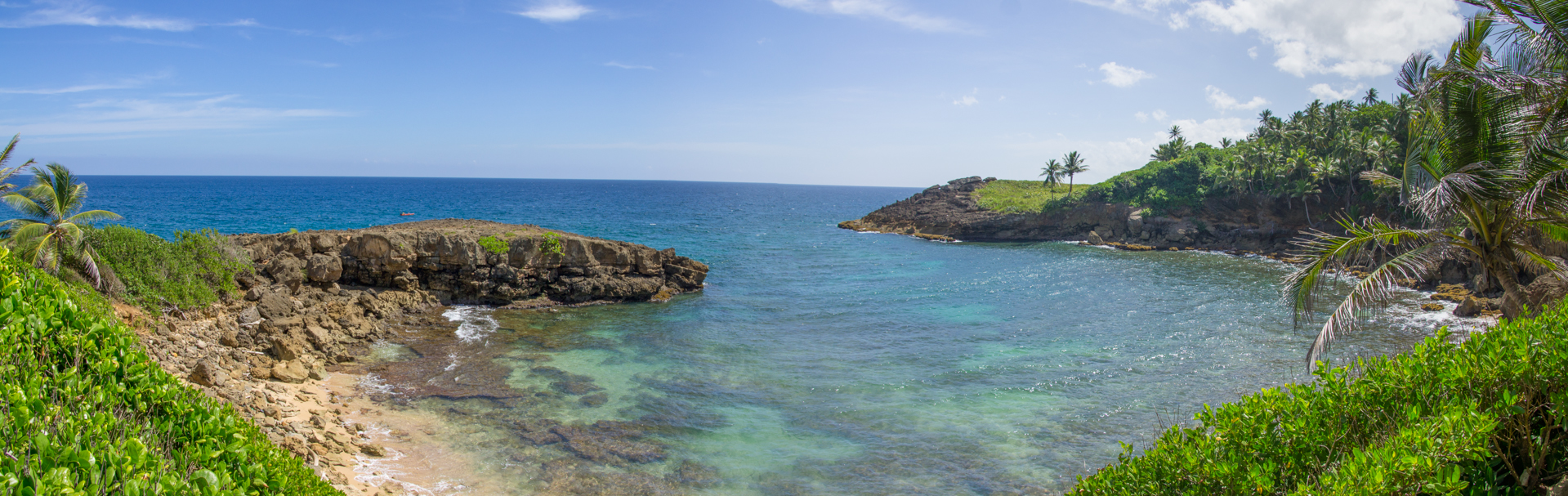
Breñas Beach in Sabana

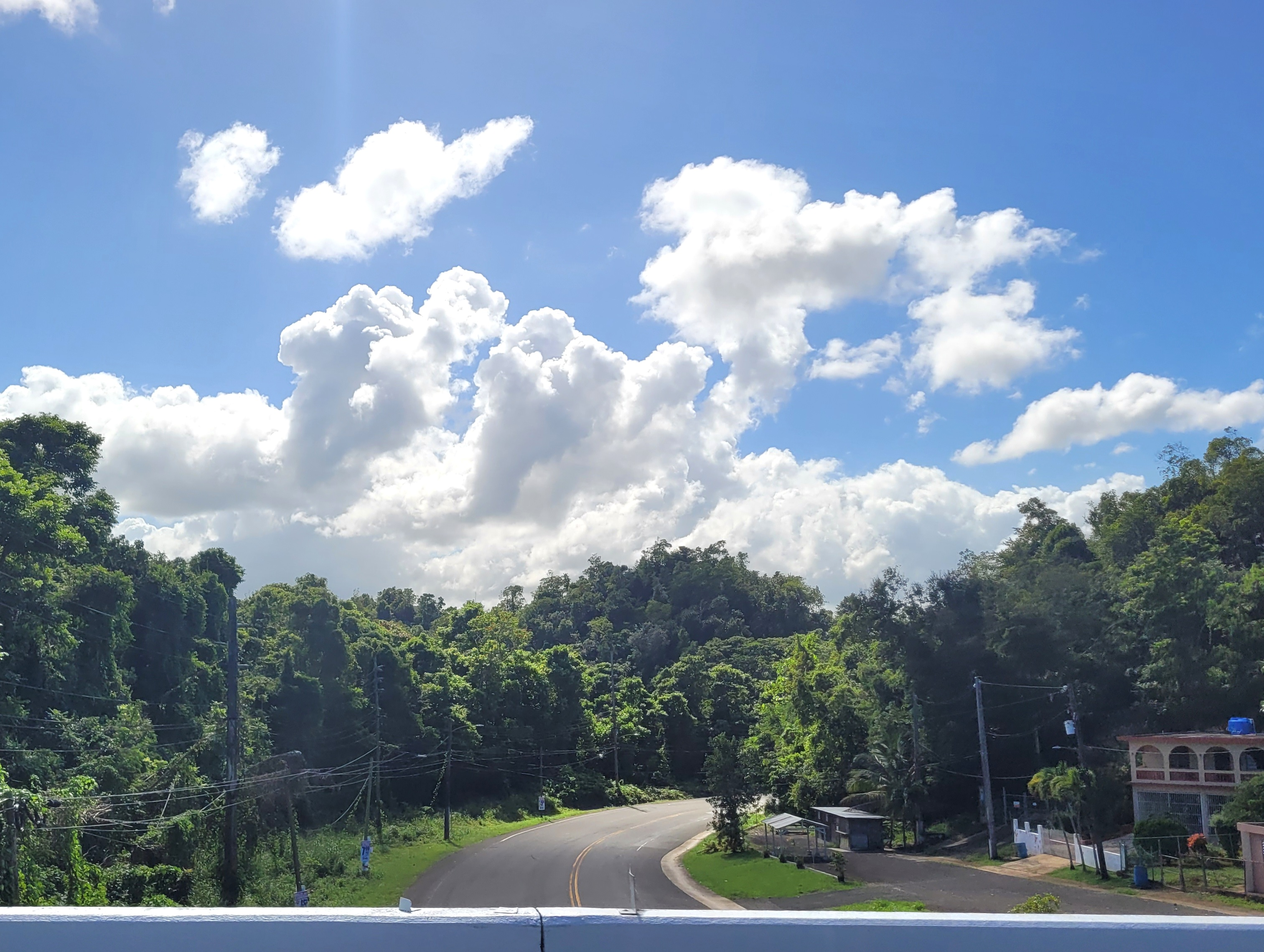
Puerto Rico Highway 690 in Sabana

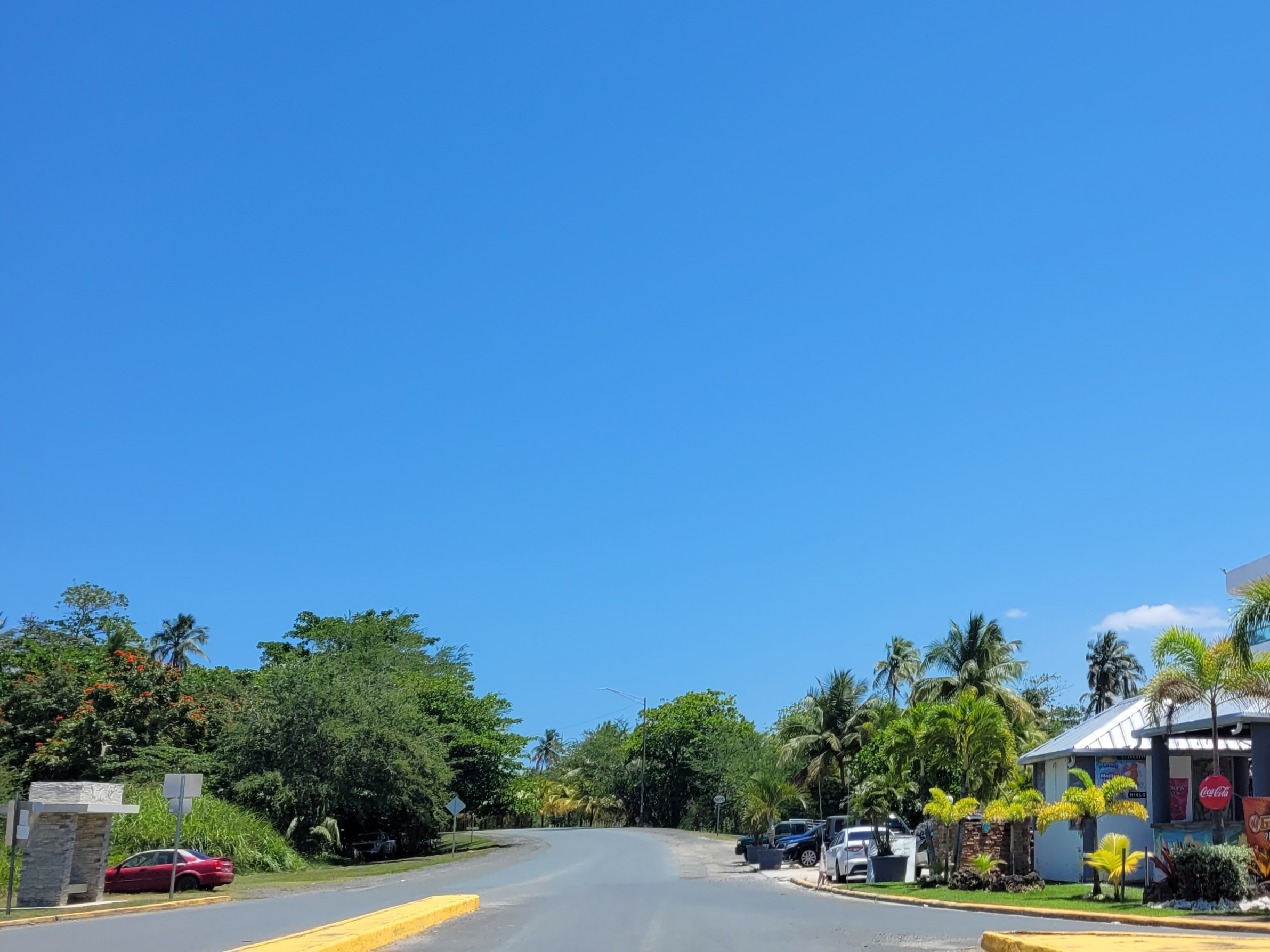
Puerto Rico Highway 6690 in Sabana

== See also ==
- List of communities in Puerto Rico
