= Puerto Rico Highway 802 =

Highway in Puerto Rico

Highway 802
- Ruta 802

Route information
- Maintained by Puerto Rico DTPW
- Length: 6.6 km (4.1 mi)

Major junctions
- West end: PR-801 in Palmarito
- PR-771 in Maná
- East end: PR-152 / PR-803 in Cedro Arriba

Location
- Country: United States
- Territory: Puerto Rico
- Municipalities: Corozal, Naranjito

Highway system
- Roads in Puerto Rico; List
← PR-798	→ PR-803

Puerto Rico Highway 802 (PR-802) is an east–west road between the municipalities of Corozal and Naranjito in Puerto Rico. With a length of 6.6 kilometers (4.1 mi), it begins at its intersection with PR-801 in Palmarito barrio in Corozal, and ends at its junction with PR-152 and PR-803 in Cedro Arriba barrio in Naranjito.

== Route description ==
Puerto Rico Highway 802 is a rural road with one lane in each direction along its entire length. In Corozal, PR-802 extends from PR-801 in Palmarito to the Naranjito municipal limit, crossing Maná and Palos Blancos barrios. In Maná, it meets with PR-771, a road that heads to Barrancas, a barrio of Barranquitas municipality. Between Maná and Palos Blancos, this highway crosses the Río Grande de Manatí. In Naranjito, PR-802 is shorter than in Corozal, extending from the Corozal municipal limit until its eastern terminus at PR-152 and PR-803 intersection. In this municipality, the road is located entirely in Cedro Arriba barrio.

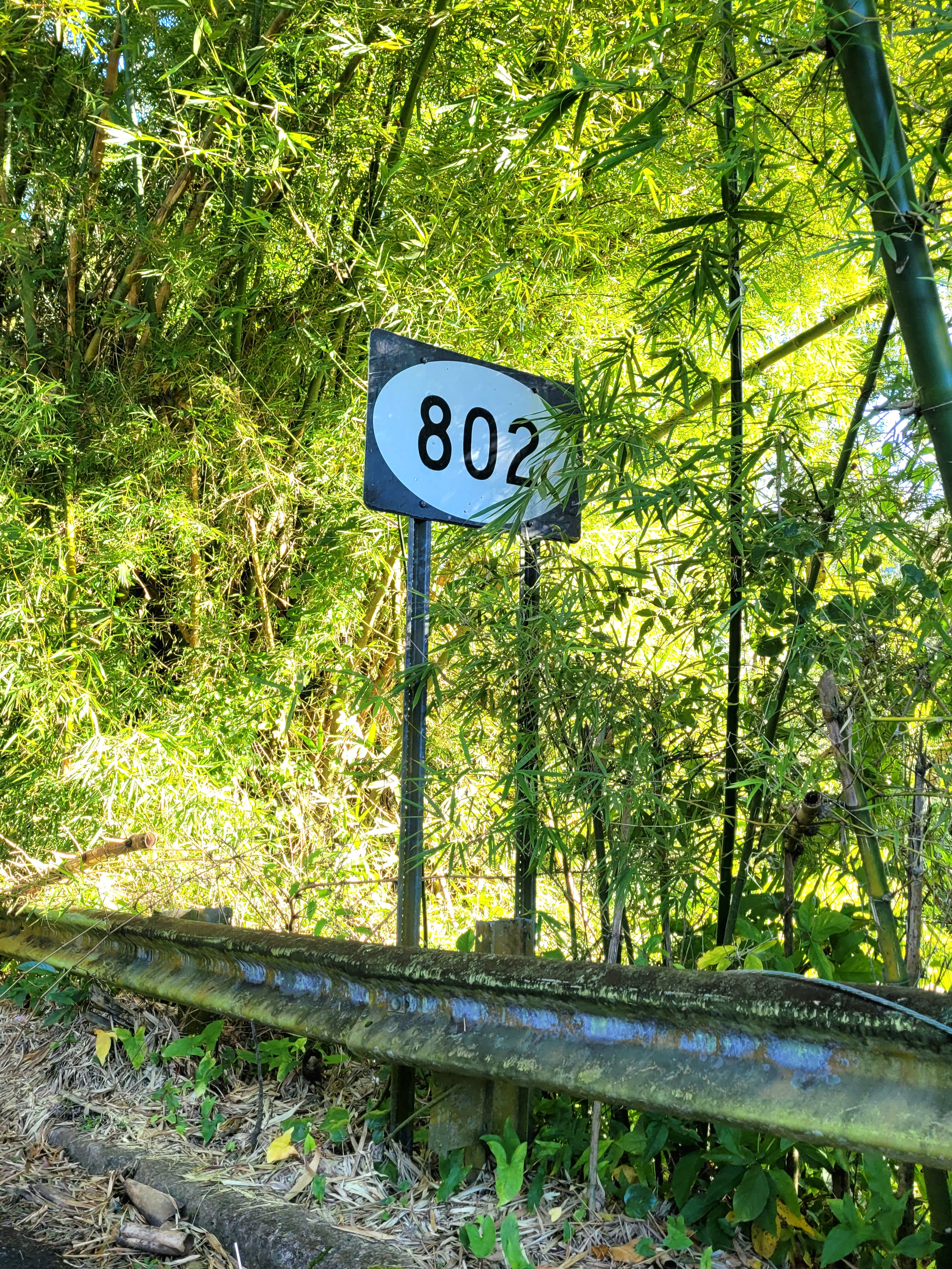
Sign for PR-802 in Palmarito, Corozal, looking east

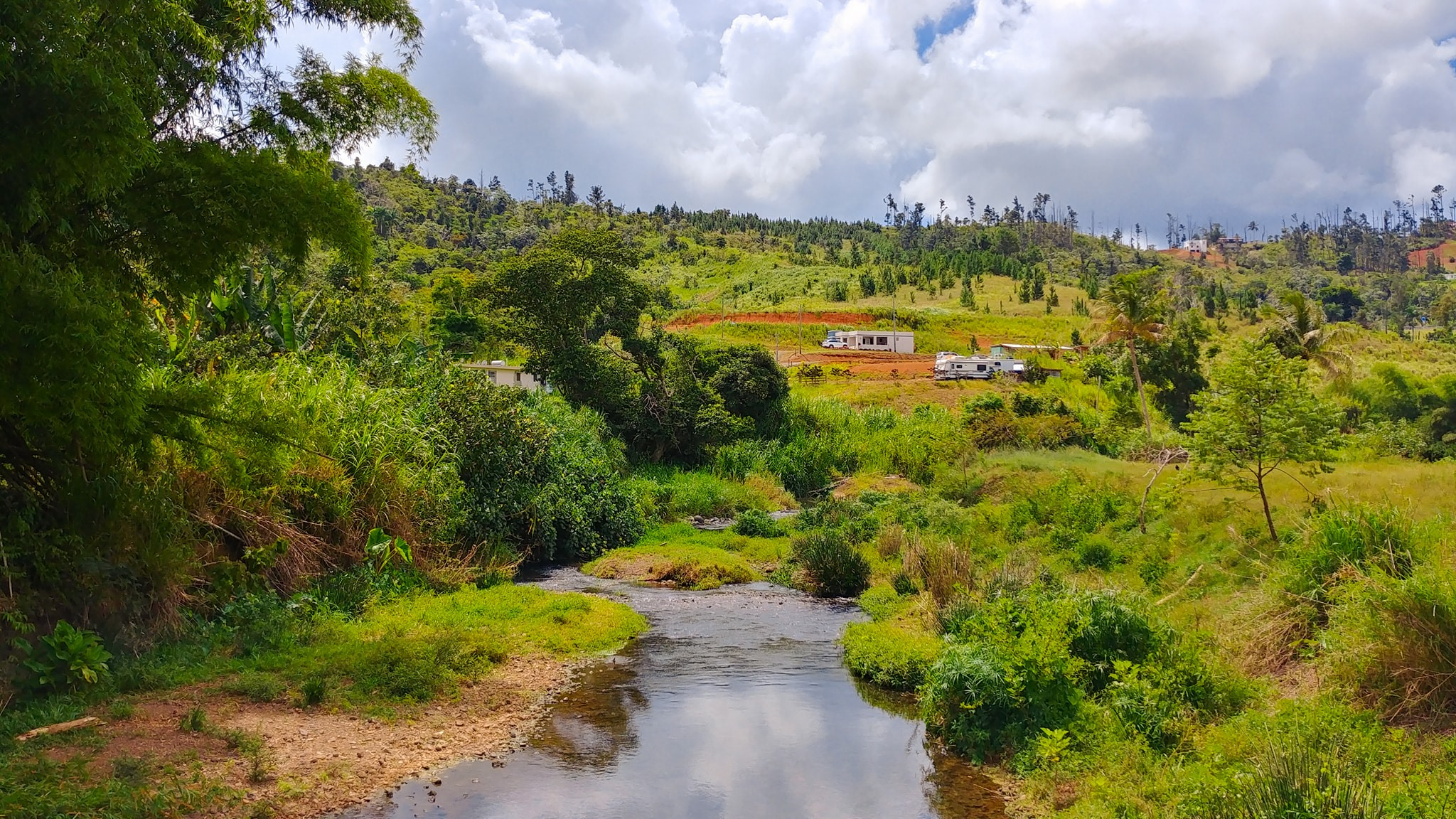
Río Grande de Manatí from PR-802 bridge

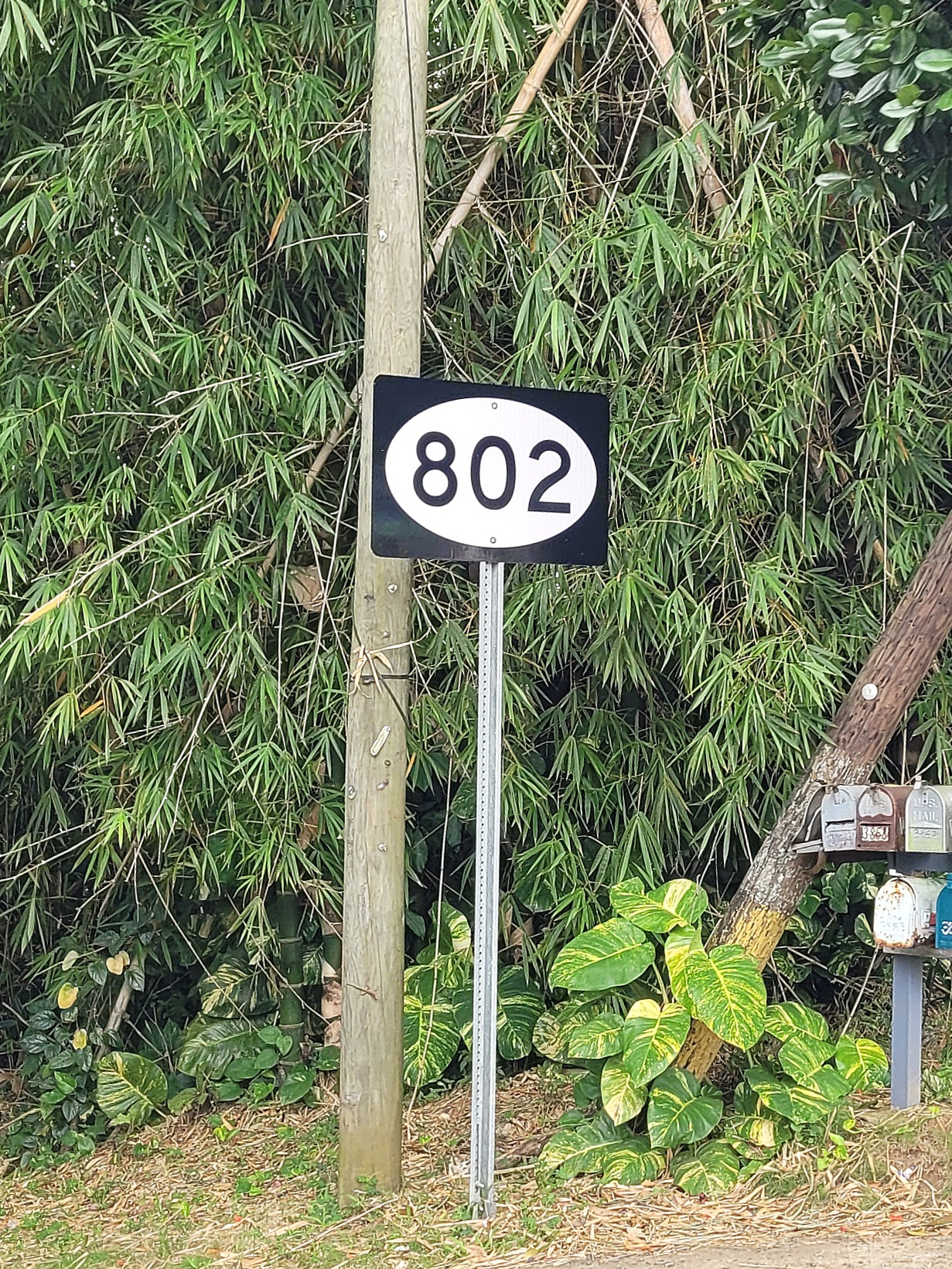
Westbound sign in Cedro Arriba, Naranjito

== Major intersections ==
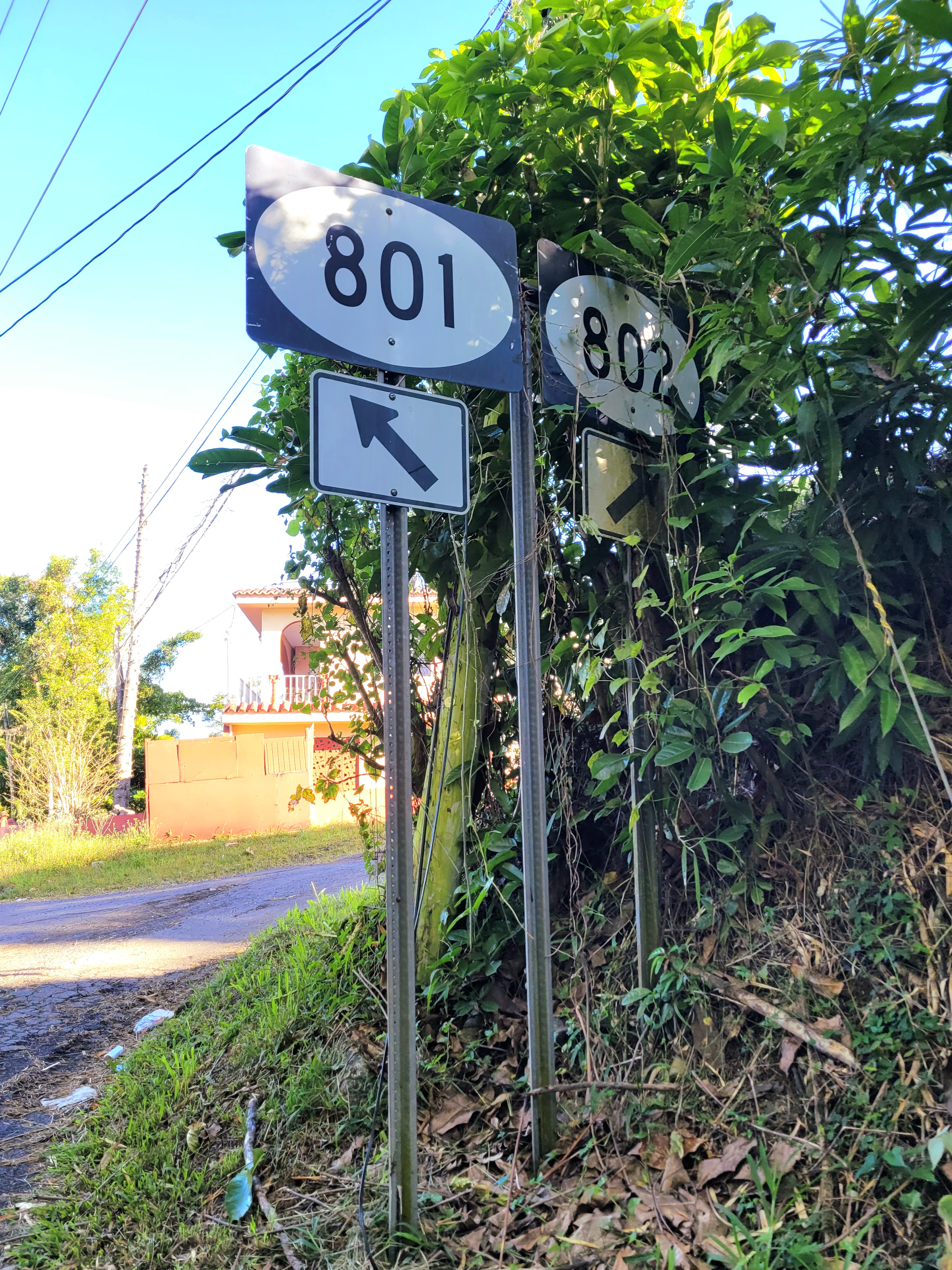
PR-801 east at PR-802 intersection in Palmarito, Corozal

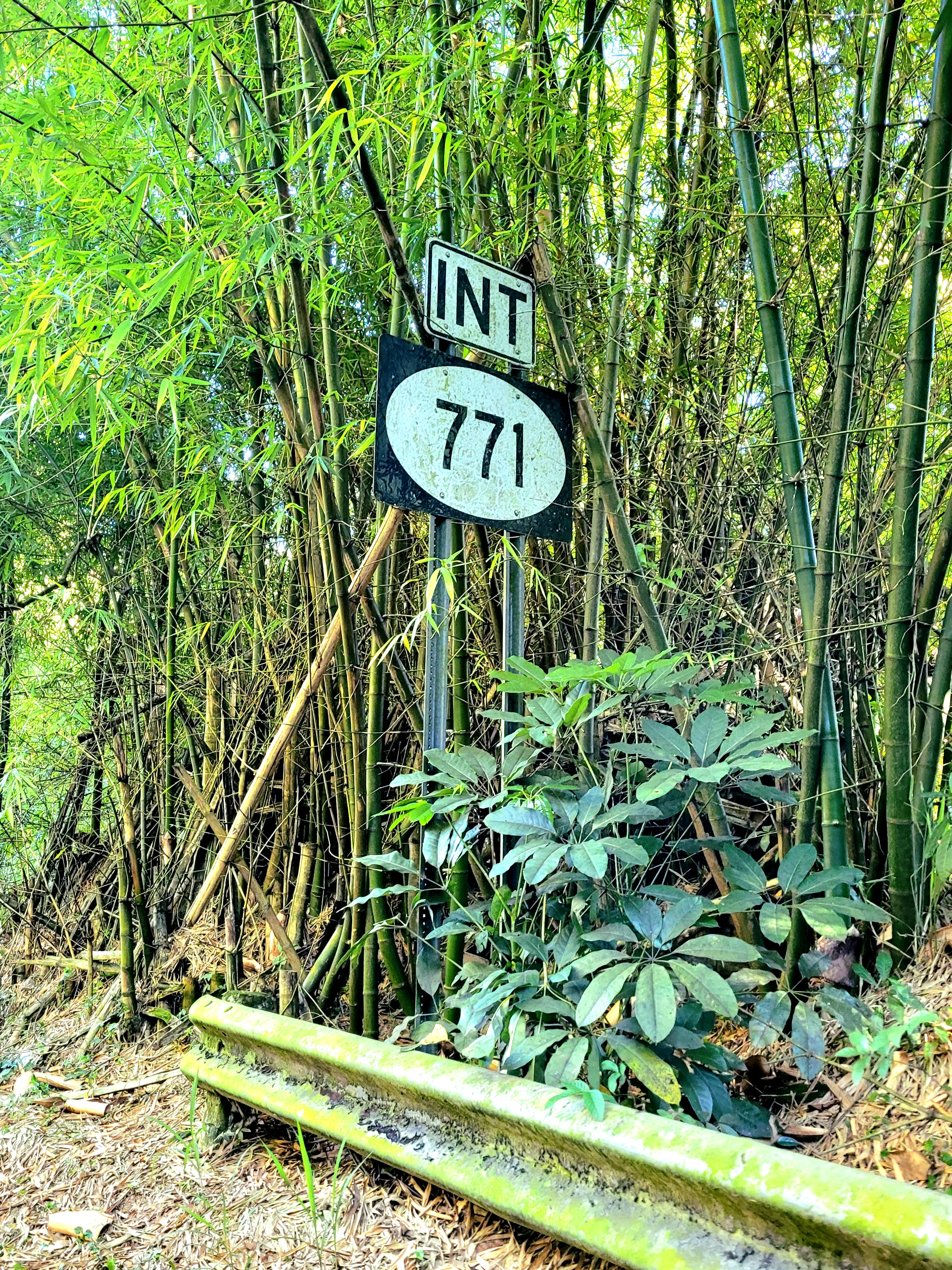
PR-802 east approaching PR-771 intersection in Maná, Corozal

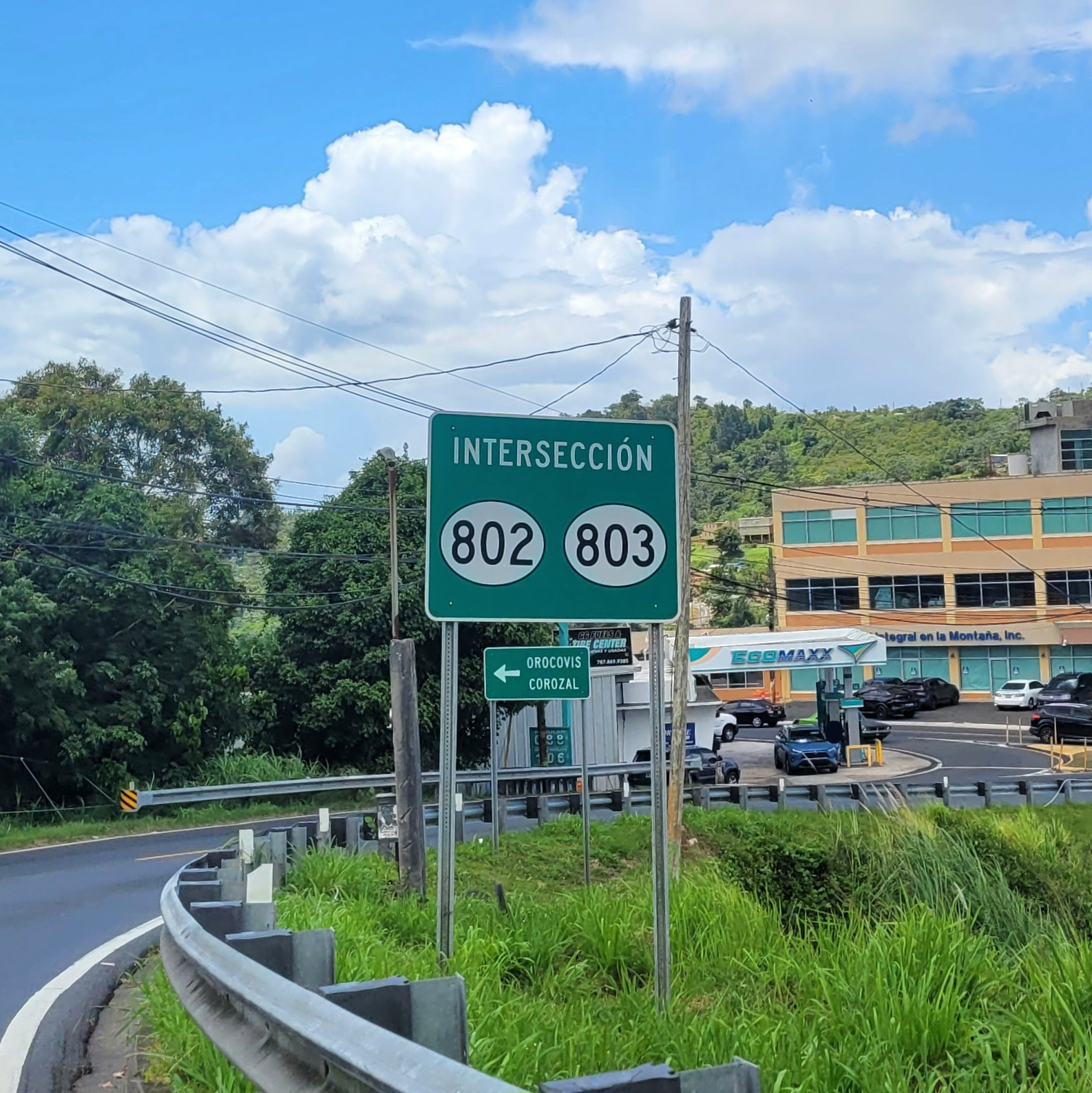
PR-152 north near PR-802 and PR-803 junction in Cedro Arriba, Naranjito

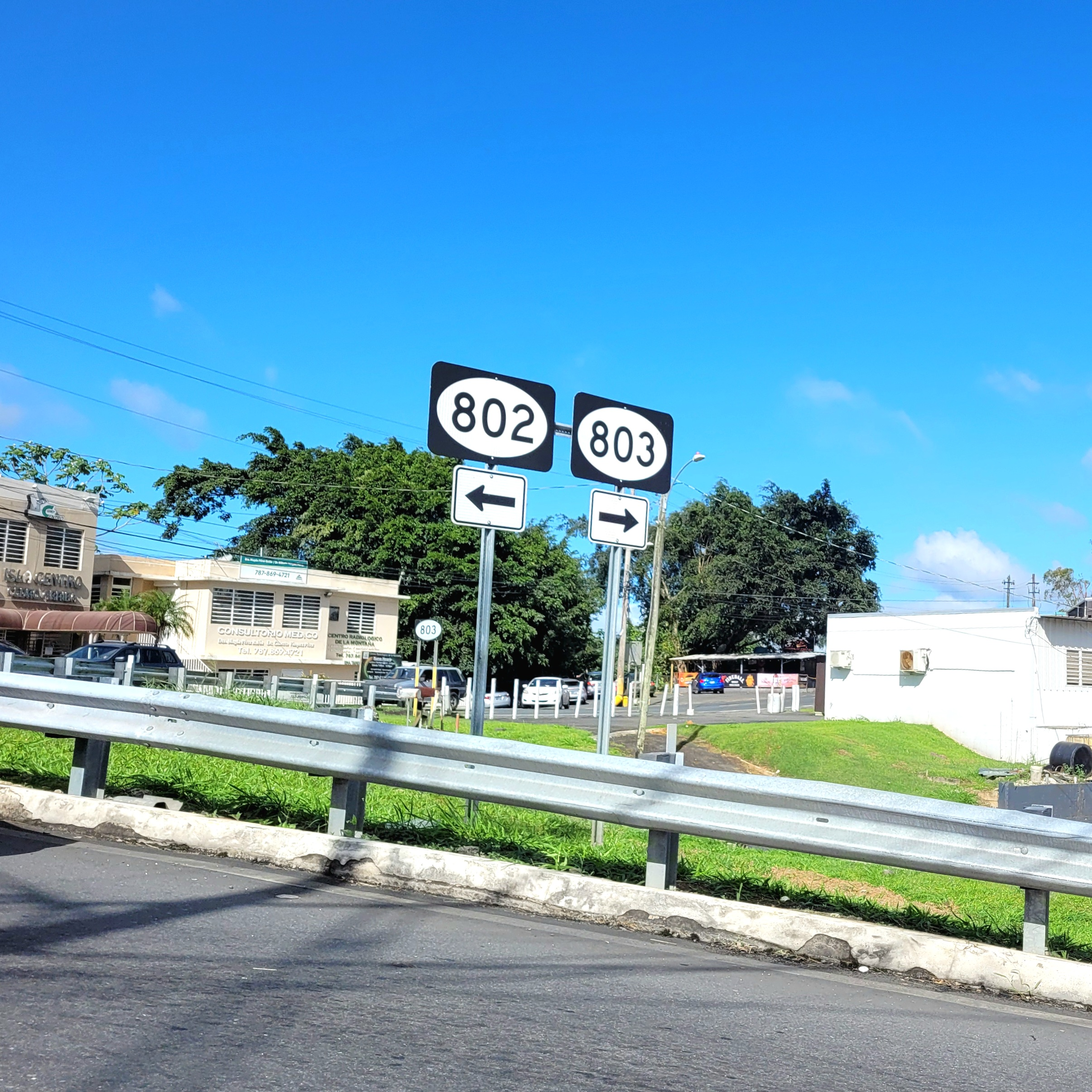
Signs for PR-802 and PR-803 at PR-152 junction in Cedro Arriba, Naranjito

Municipality	Location	km	mi	Destinations	Notes
Corozal	Palmarito	0.0	0.0	PR-801 – Palmarito	Western terminus of PR-802
Corozal	Maná	3.9	2.4	PR-771 (Carretera Barrancas) – Barranquitas, Barrancas	
Naranjito	Cedro Arriba	6.6	4.1	PR-152 / PR-803 – Naranjito, Barranquitas, Corozal	Eastern terminus of PR-802
1.000 mi = 1.609 km; 1.000 km = 0.621 mi
