= Puerto Rico Highway 803 =

Highway in Puerto Rico

Highway 803
- Ruta 803

Route information
- Maintained by Puerto Rico DTPW
- Length: 10.2 km (6.3 mi)

Major junctions
- South end: PR-152 / PR-802 in Cedro Arriba
- PR-805 in Palos Blancos; PR-808 in Palos Blancos
- North end: PR-164 in Palmarejo

Location
- Country: United States
- Territory: Puerto Rico
- Municipalities: Naranjito, Corozal

Highway system
- Roads in Puerto Rico; List
← PR-802	→ PR-805

Puerto Rico Highway 803 (PR-803) is a north–south road that travels from eastern Corozal to southwestern Naranjito in Puerto Rico. With a length of 10.2 km (6.3 mi), it begins at PR-164 in Palmarejo barrio and ends at its junction with PR-152 and PR-802 in Cedro Arriba barrio.

== Route description ==
Puerto Rico Highway 803 is a rural road with one lane in each direction along its entire length. In Corozal, it begins at PR-164 intersection, crossing Palmarejo and Palos Blancos barrios until the Naranjito municipal limit. In Palos Blancos, PR-803 climbs the Corozal mountains and meets with PR-808 and PR-805 near the Monte Choca State Forest. In Naranjito, it has a shorter length than in Corozal, located entirely within Cedro Arriba barrio, beginning from the Corozal municipal limit to its southern terminus at PR-152 and PR-802 intersection.

Puerto Rico Highway 803 by municipality

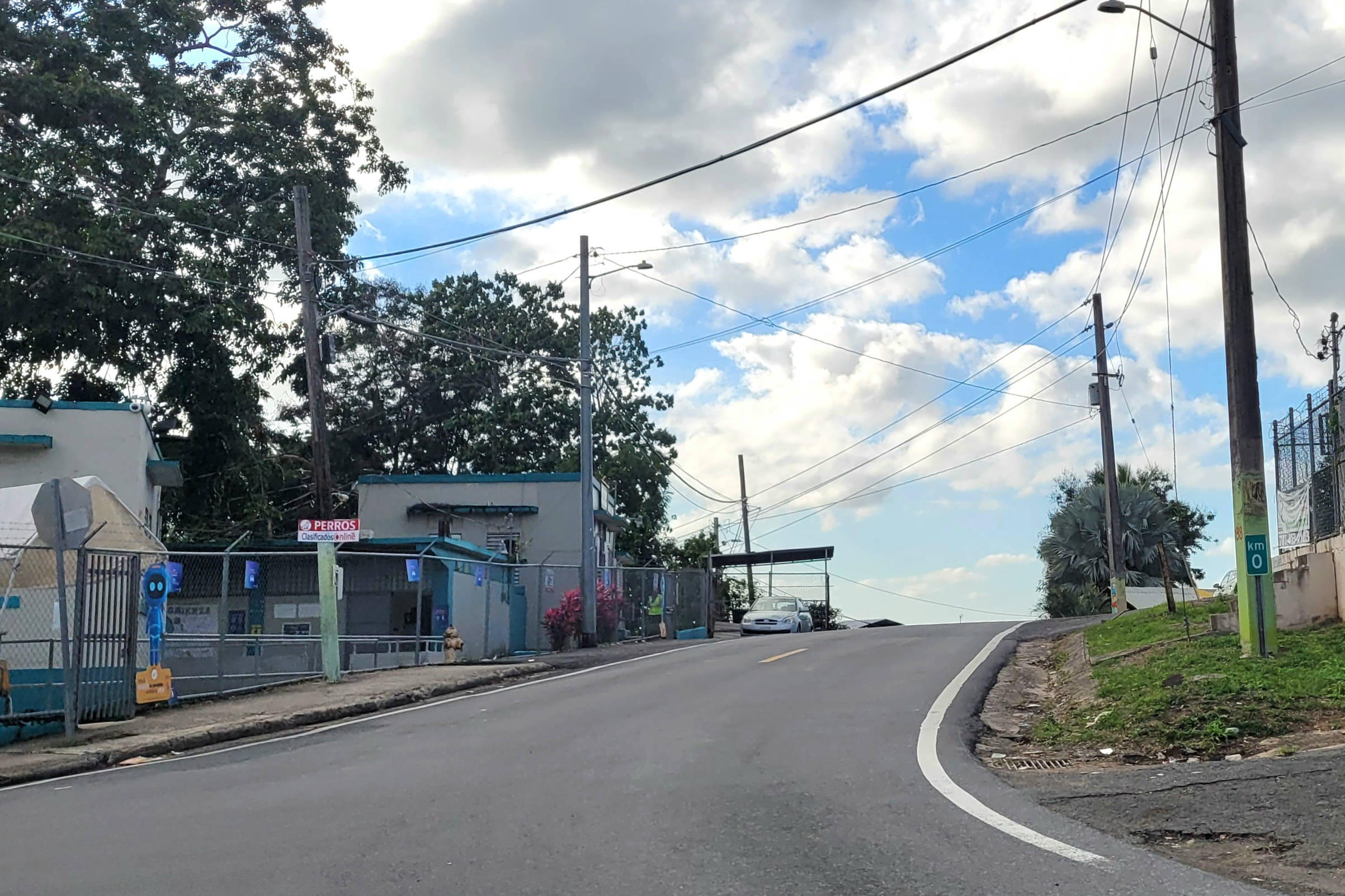
Northern terminus at PR-164 junction in Palmarejo, Corozal, heading south

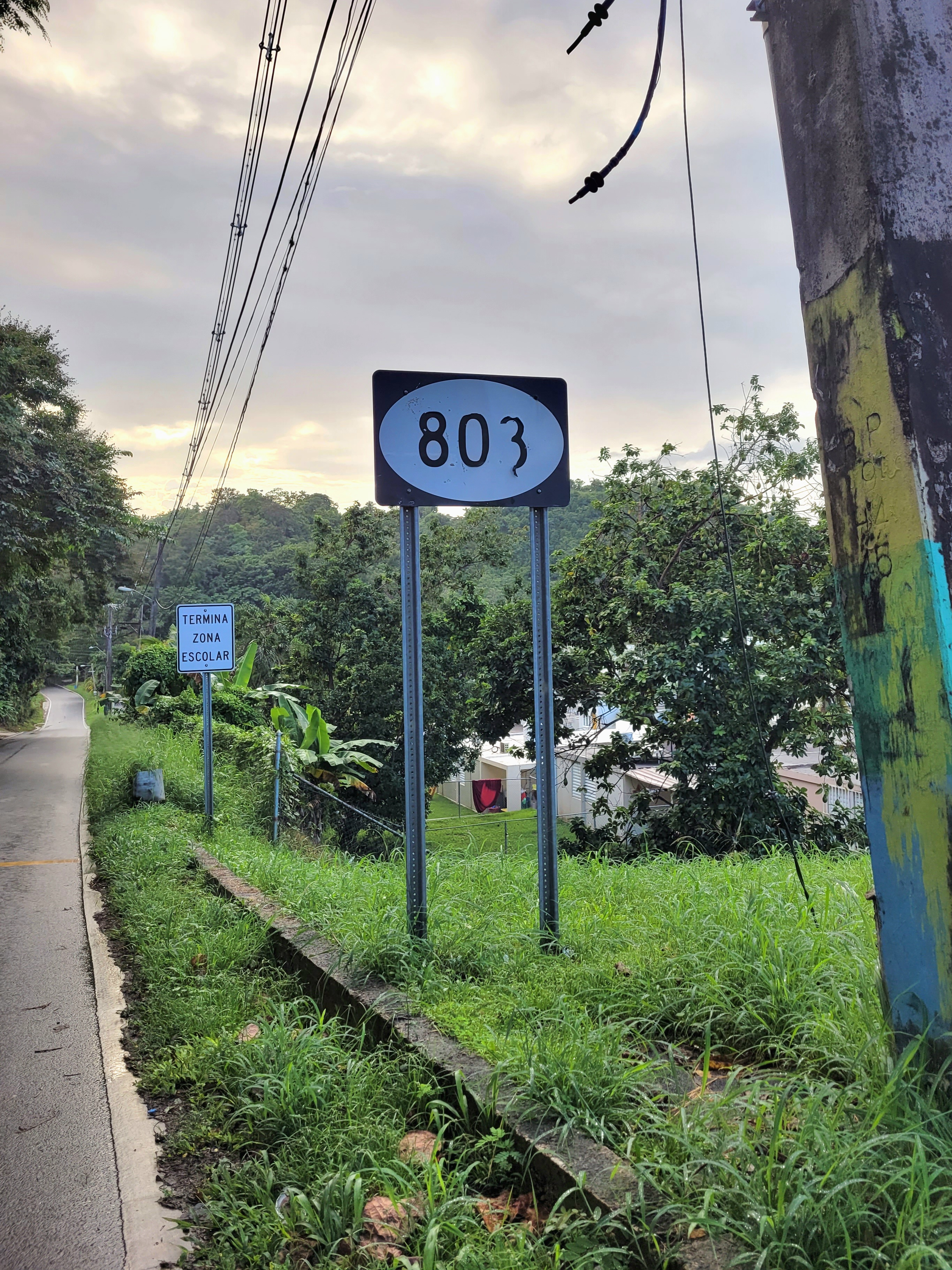
Southbound sign in Palmarejo, Corozal

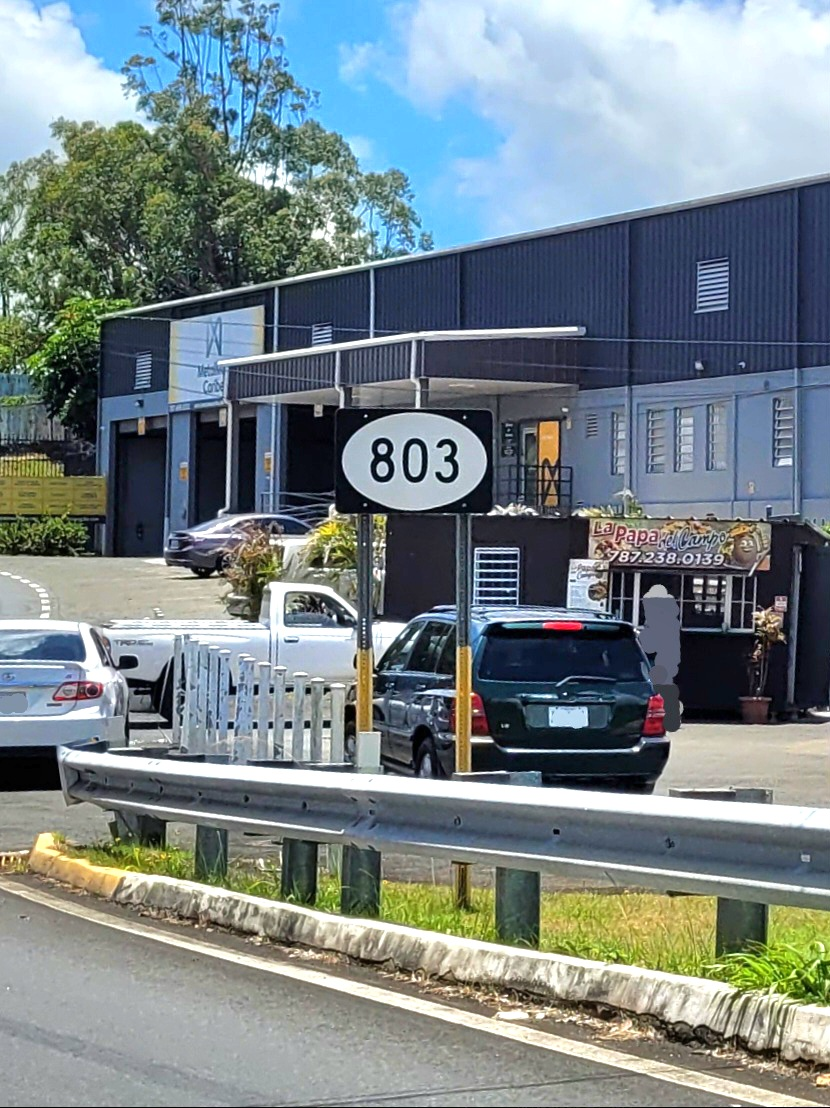
Northbound sign in Cedro Arriba, Naranjito

== History ==
Prior to its numerical designation, PR-803 was only known as Carretera de Palos Blancos. The current numerical designation corresponds to the 1953 Puerto Rico highway renumbering, a process implemented by the Puerto Rico Department of Transportation and Public Works (Spanish: Departamento de Transportación y Obras Públicas) that increased the insular highway network to connect existing routes with different locations around Puerto Rico.

== Major intersections ==
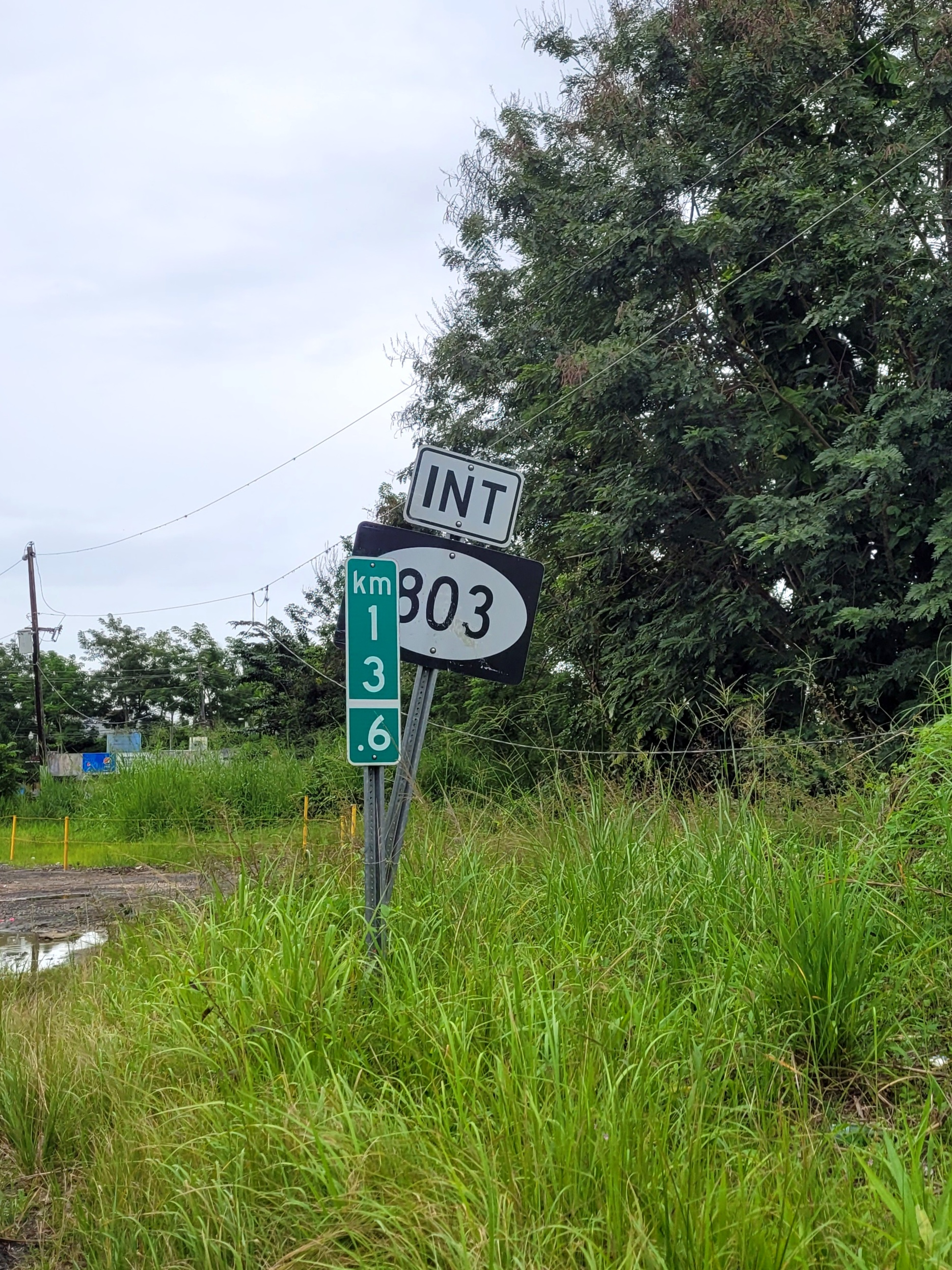
PR-164 west near PR-803 intersection in Palmarejo, Corozal

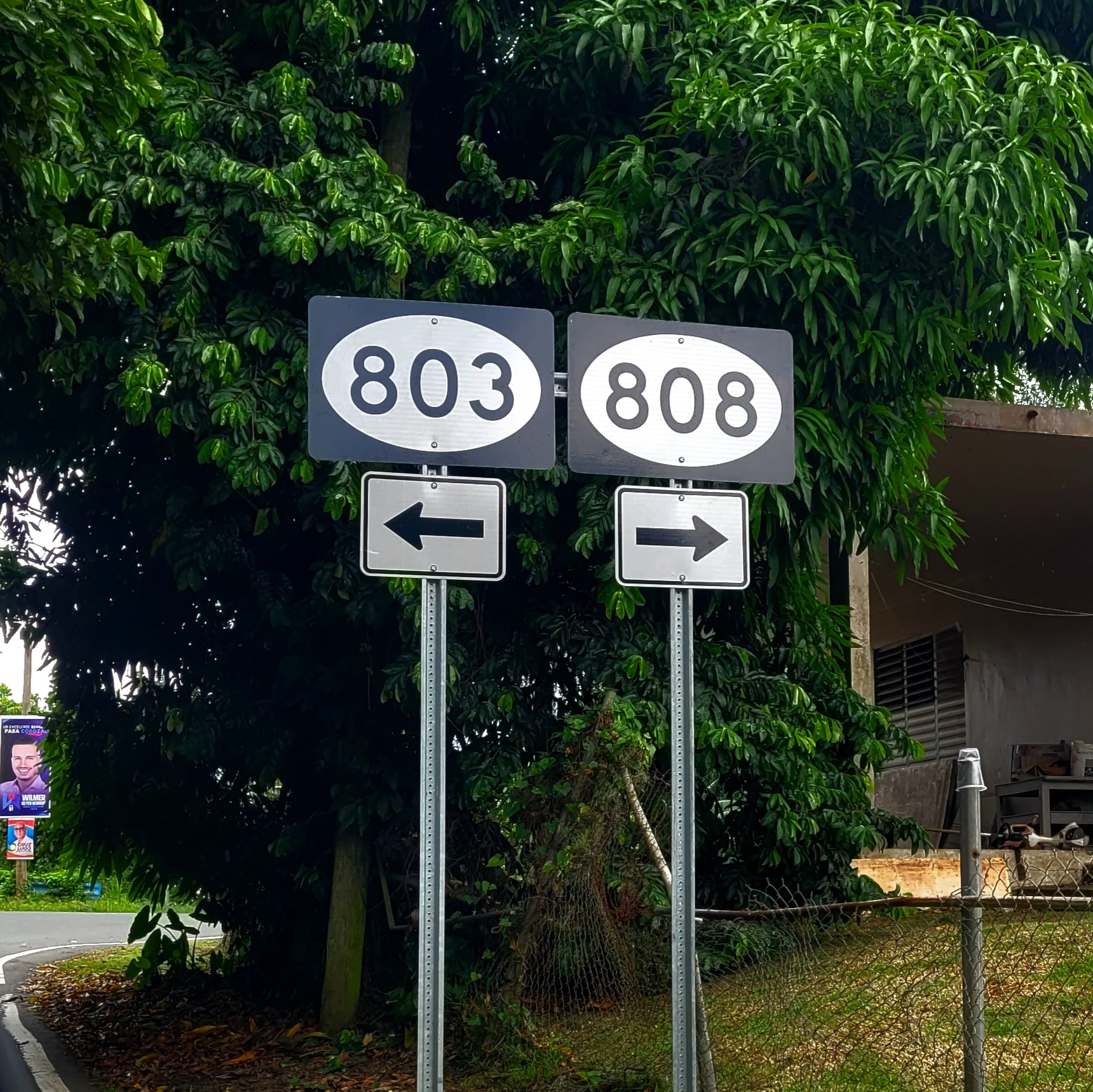
PR-803 north at PR-808 intersection in Palos Blancos, Corozal

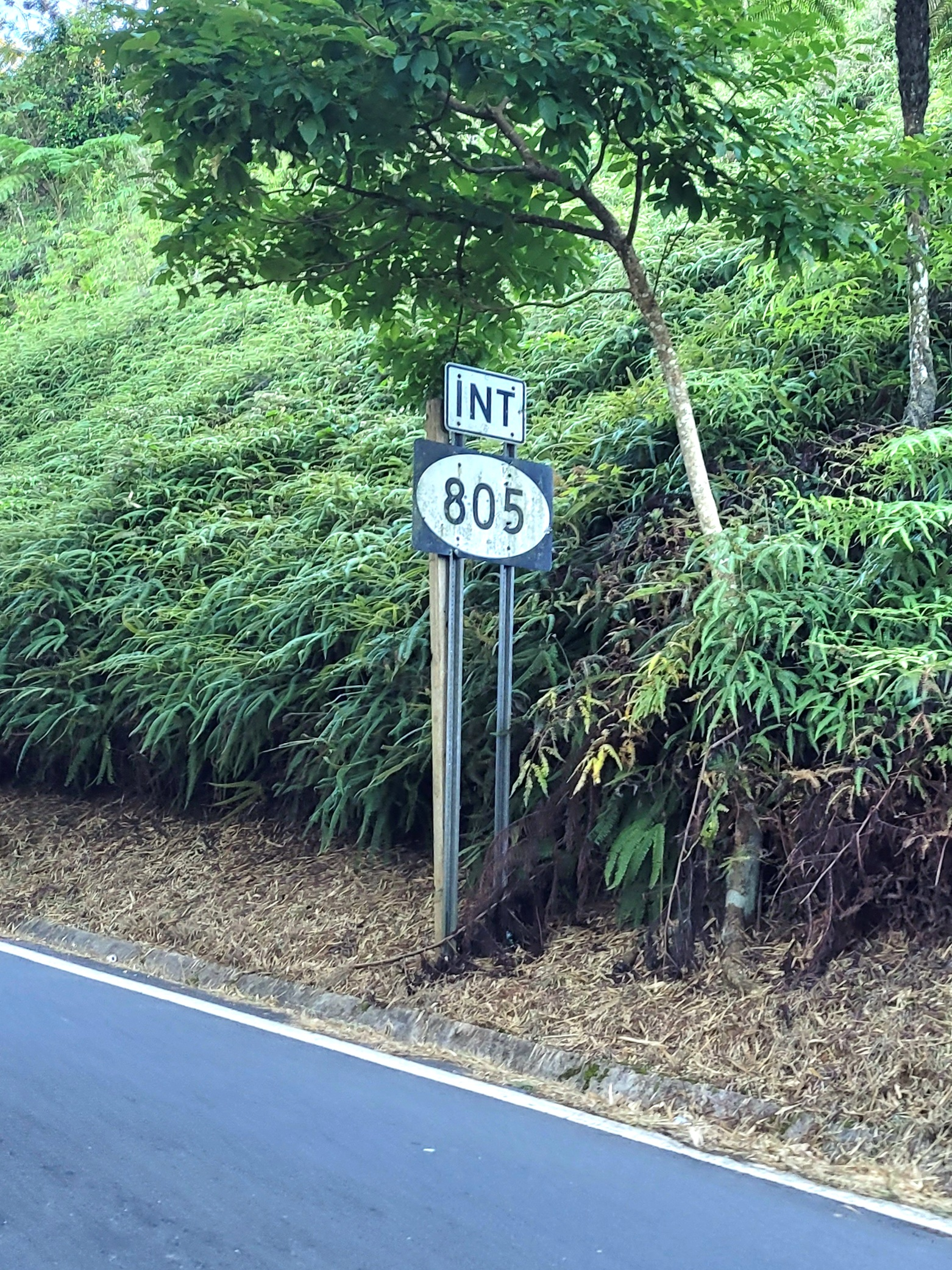
PR-803 south near PR-805 intersection in Palos Blancos, Corozal

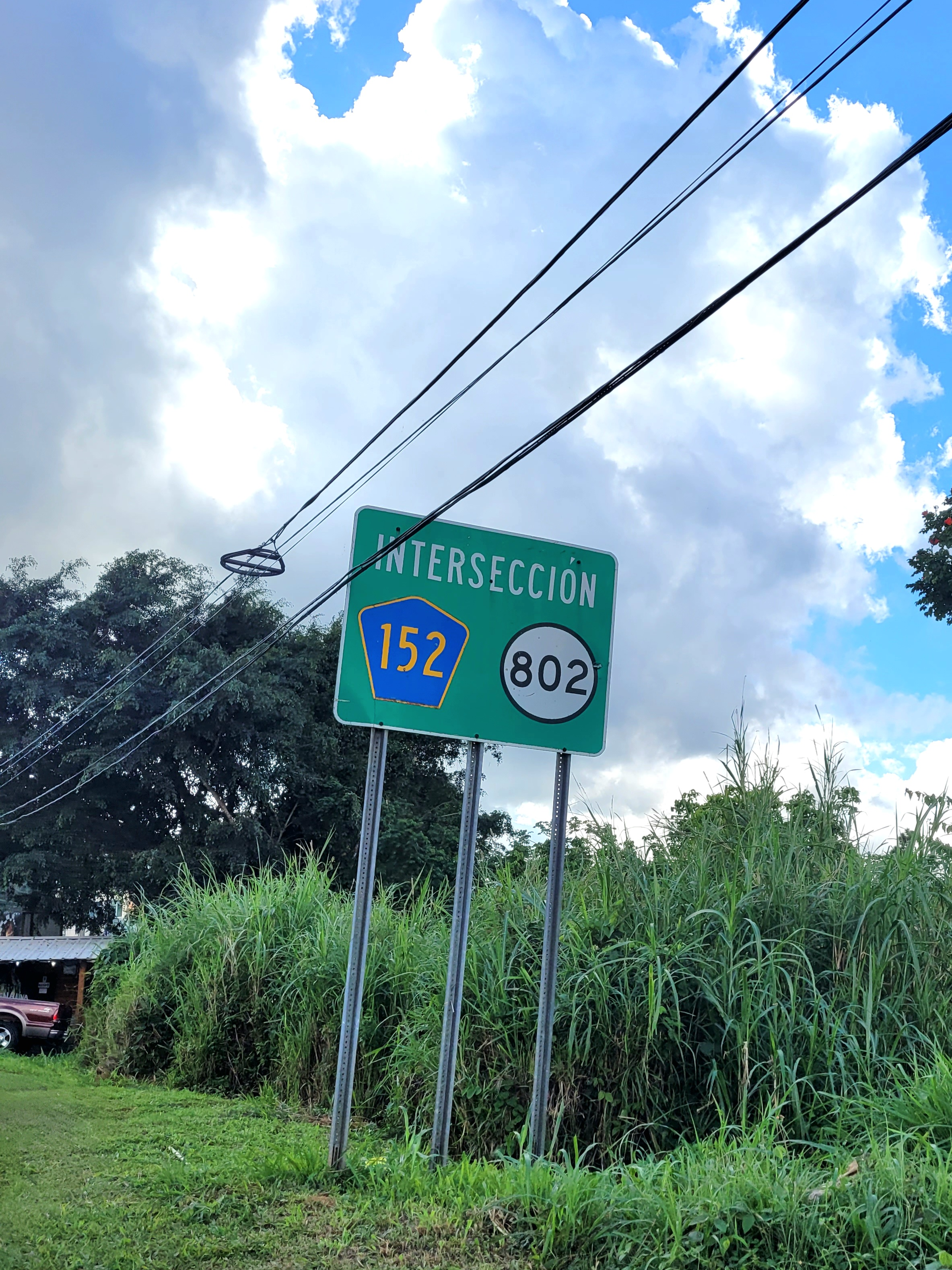
PR-803 south near PR-152 and PR-802 junction in Cedro Arriba, Naranjito

Municipality	Location	km	mi	Destinations	Notes
Naranjito	Cedro Arriba	10.2	6.3	PR-152 / PR-802 – Naranjito, Barranquitas, Comerío, Maná	Southern terminus of PR-803
Corozal	Palos Blancos	8.0	5.0	PR-805 – Morovis	Access to Negros
Corozal	Palos Blancos	6.2	3.9	PR-808 – Cedro Abajo	
Corozal	Palmarejo	0.0	0.0	PR-164 – Corozal, Naranjito	Northern terminus of PR-803
1.000 mi = 1.609 km; 1.000 km = 0.621 mi
