= Puerto Rico Highway 805 =

Highway in Puerto Rico

Highway 805
- Ruta 805

Route information
- Maintained by Puerto Rico DTPW
- Length: 7.3 km (4.5 mi)

Major junctions
- West end: PR-568 in Negros
- PR-807 in Negros–Palos Blancos
- East end: PR-803 in Palos Blancos

Location
- Country: United States
- Territory: Puerto Rico
- Municipalities: Corozal

Highway system
- Roads in Puerto Rico; List
← PR-803	→ PR-806

Puerto Rico Highway 805 (PR-805) is an east–west road located in the municipality of Corozal in Puerto Rico. With a length of 7.3 km (4.5 mi), it extends from its intersection with PR-568 near the Cuchillas boundary, passing through Negros barrio until its junction with PR-803 in Palos Blancos area.

== Route description ==
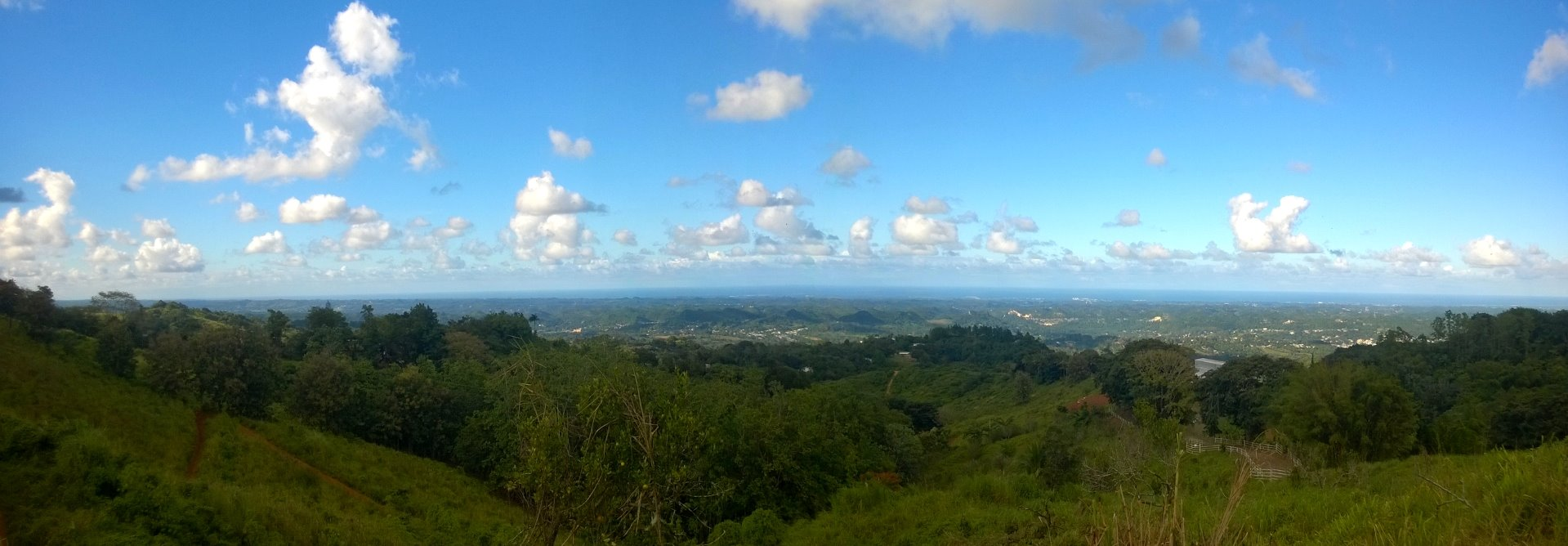
View of the northern coast of Puerto Rico from PR-805 in Negros barrio

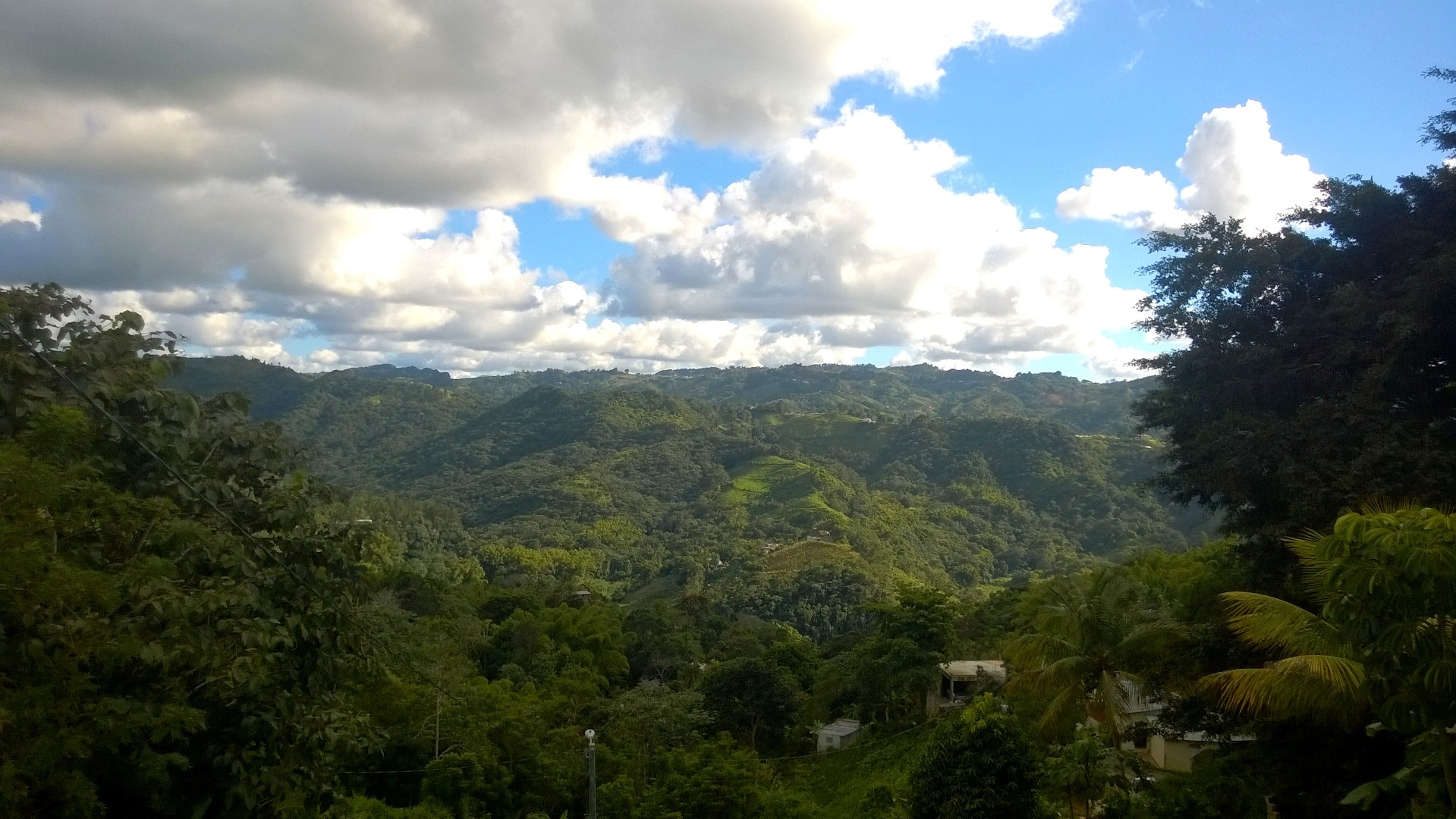
View of the Cordillera Central mountains from PR-805 in Negros barrio

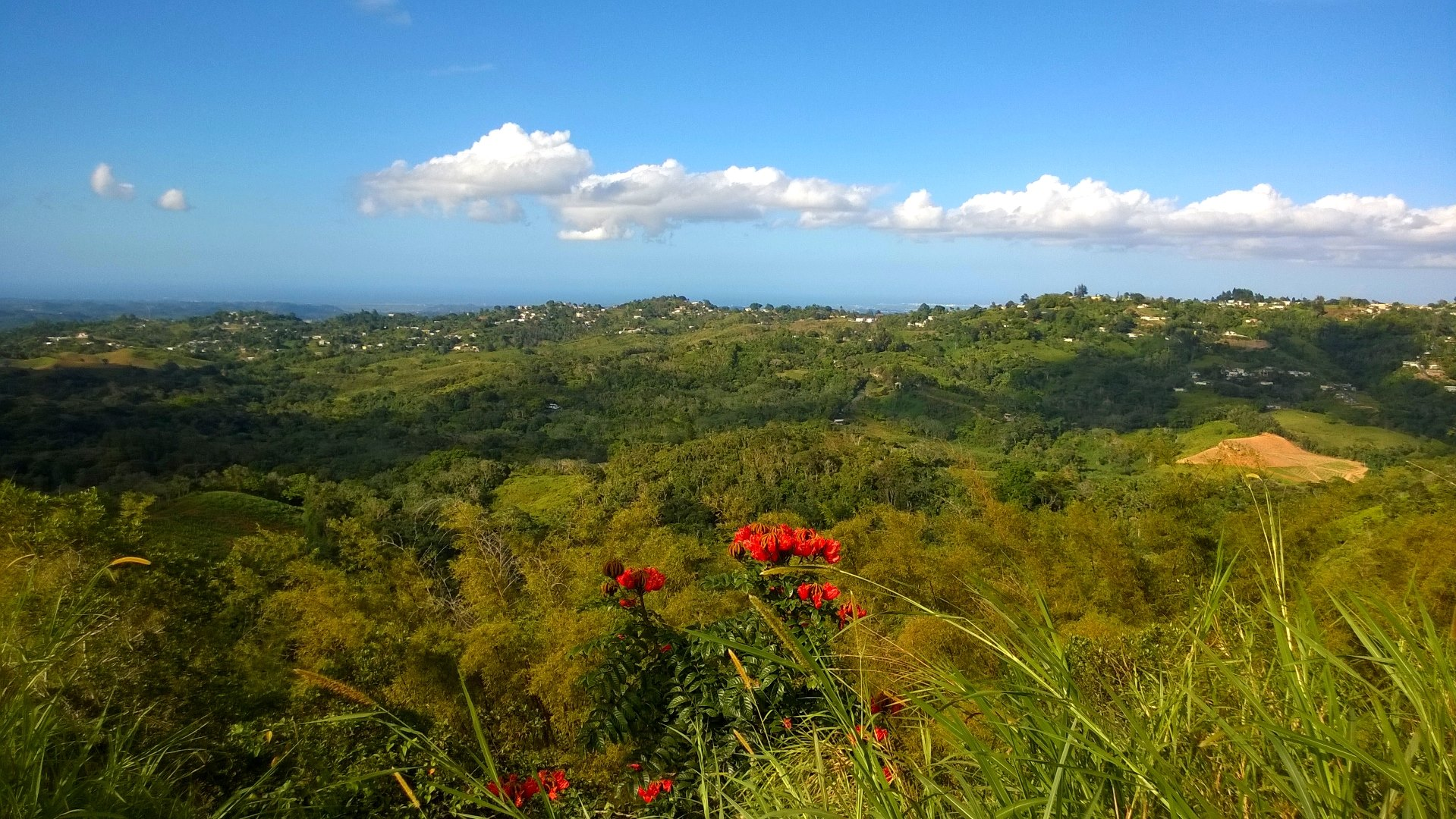
Looking north from PR-805 in Palos Blancos barrio

Puerto Rico Highway 805 is a rural road with a single lane per direction along its entire length. In Negros, it extends from its junction with PR-568 near Cuchillas to its intersection with PR-807, passing through several neighborhoods and sectors with scenic views of the northern coast of Puerto Rico. In Palos Blancos, PR-805 leaves PR-807 intersection until its end at PR-803 junction near the Monte Choca State Forest.

== History ==
Prior to its numerical designation, PR-805 was only known as Camino de Negros. The current numerical designation corresponds to the 1953 Puerto Rico highway renumbering, a process implemented by the Puerto Rico Department of Transportation and Public Works (Spanish: Departamento de Transportación y Obras Públicas) that increased the insular highway network to connect existing routes with different locations around Puerto Rico.

== Major intersections ==
The entire route is located in Corozal.

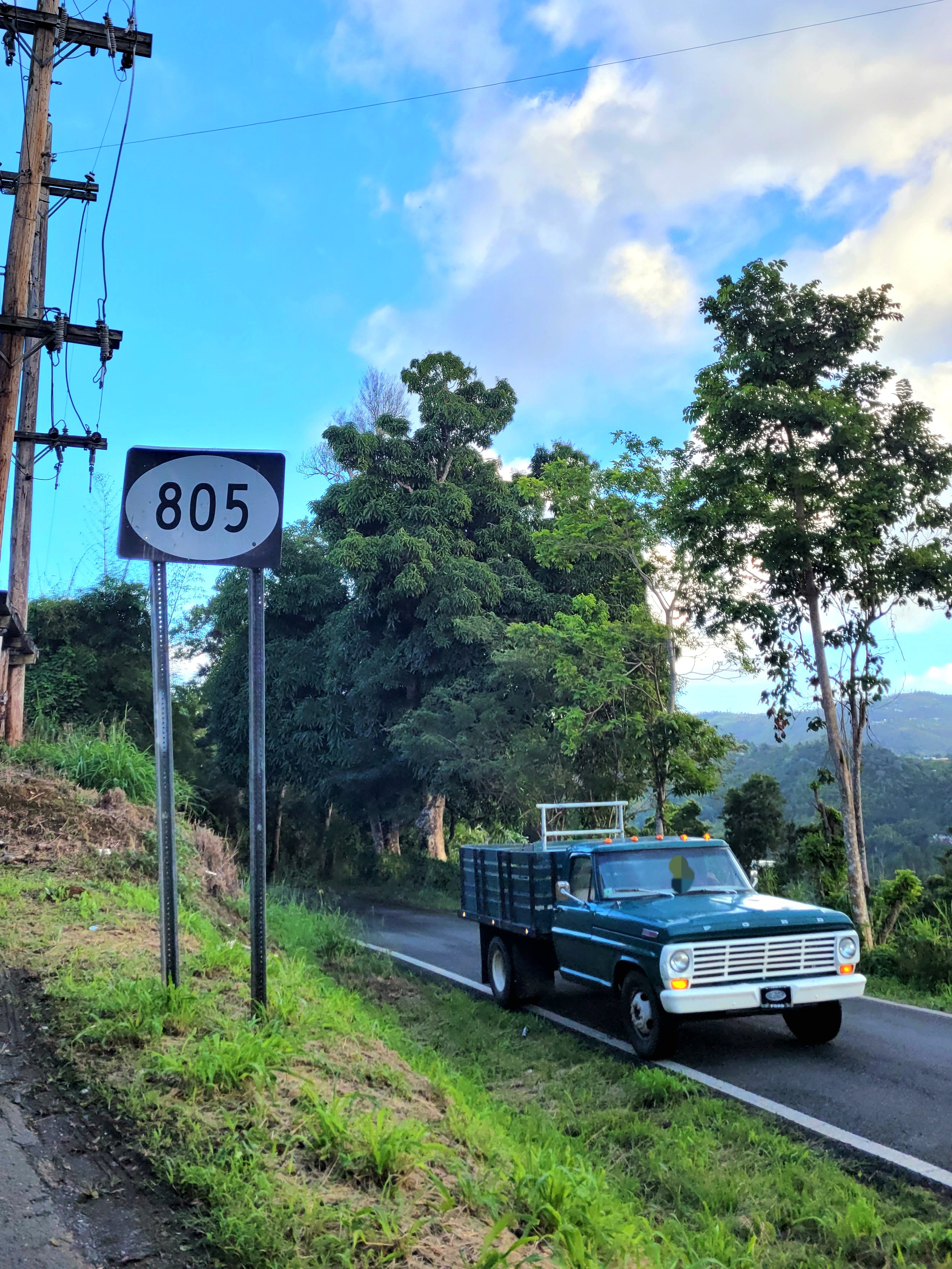
Western terminus of PR-805 at PR-568 junction in Negros barrio, looking east

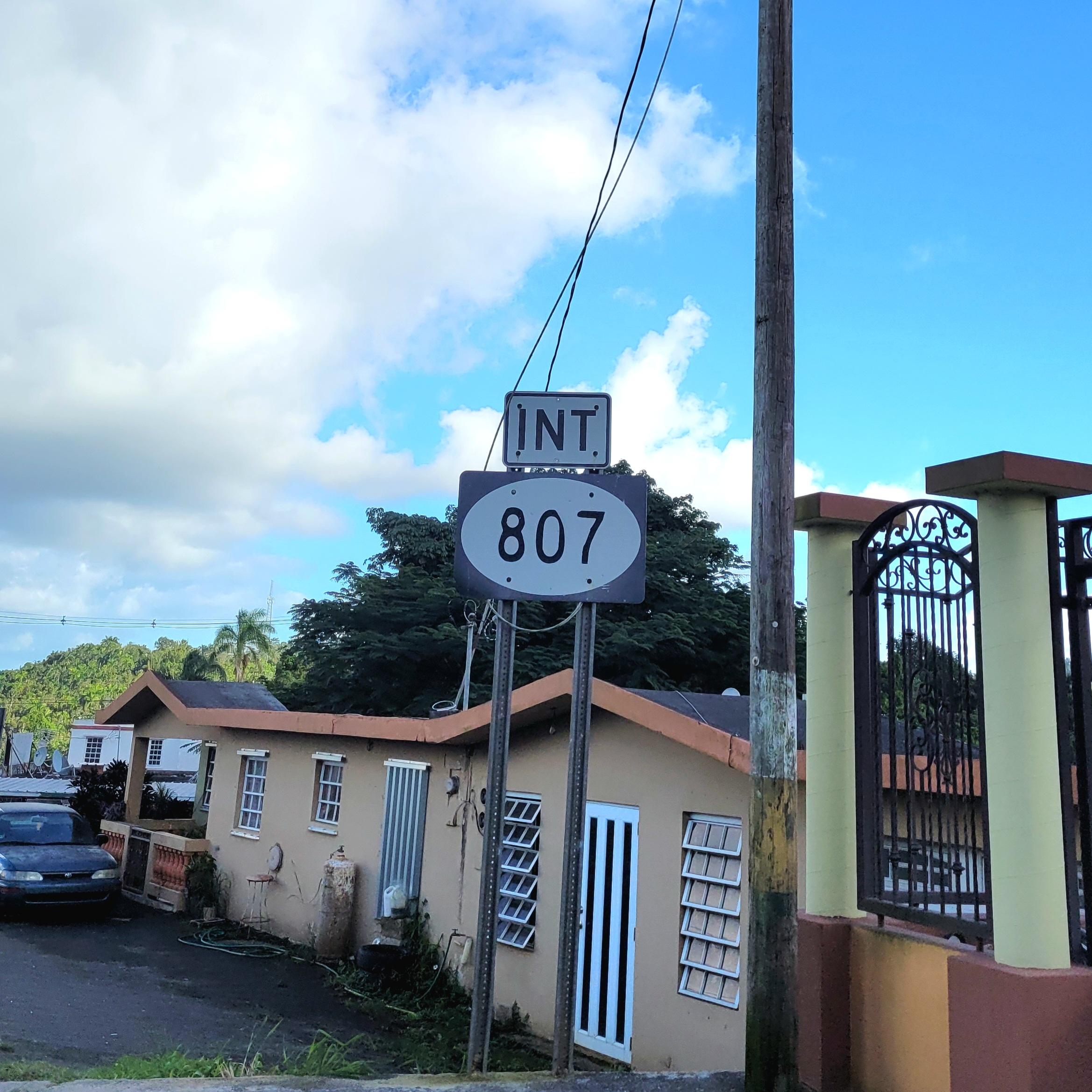
PR-805 east approaching PR-807 intersection in Negros barrio

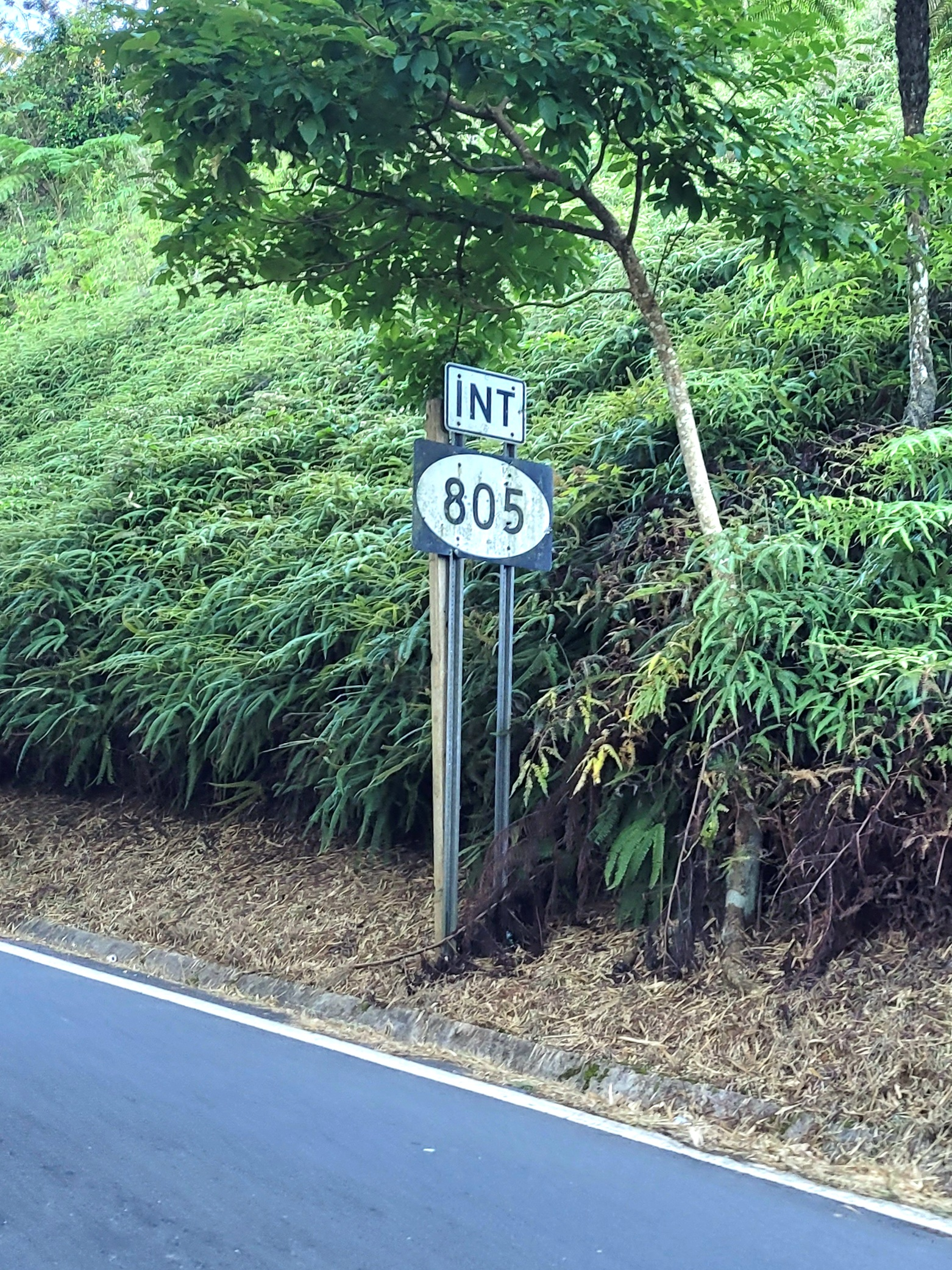
PR-803 south near the eastern terminus of PR-805 in Palos Blancos barrio

Location	km	mi	Destinations	Notes
Negros	0.0	0.0	PR-568 – Corozal, Orocovis	Western terminus of PR-805
Negros–Palos Blancos line	3.7	2.3	PR-807 – Corozal	
Palos Blancos	7.3	4.5	PR-803 – Corozal, Barranquitas	Eastern terminus of PR-805; access to Naranjito
1.000 mi = 1.609 km; 1.000 km = 0.621 mi
