= Palmarejo, Corozal, Puerto Rico =

Barrio of Puerto Rico

Palmarejo
- Barrio
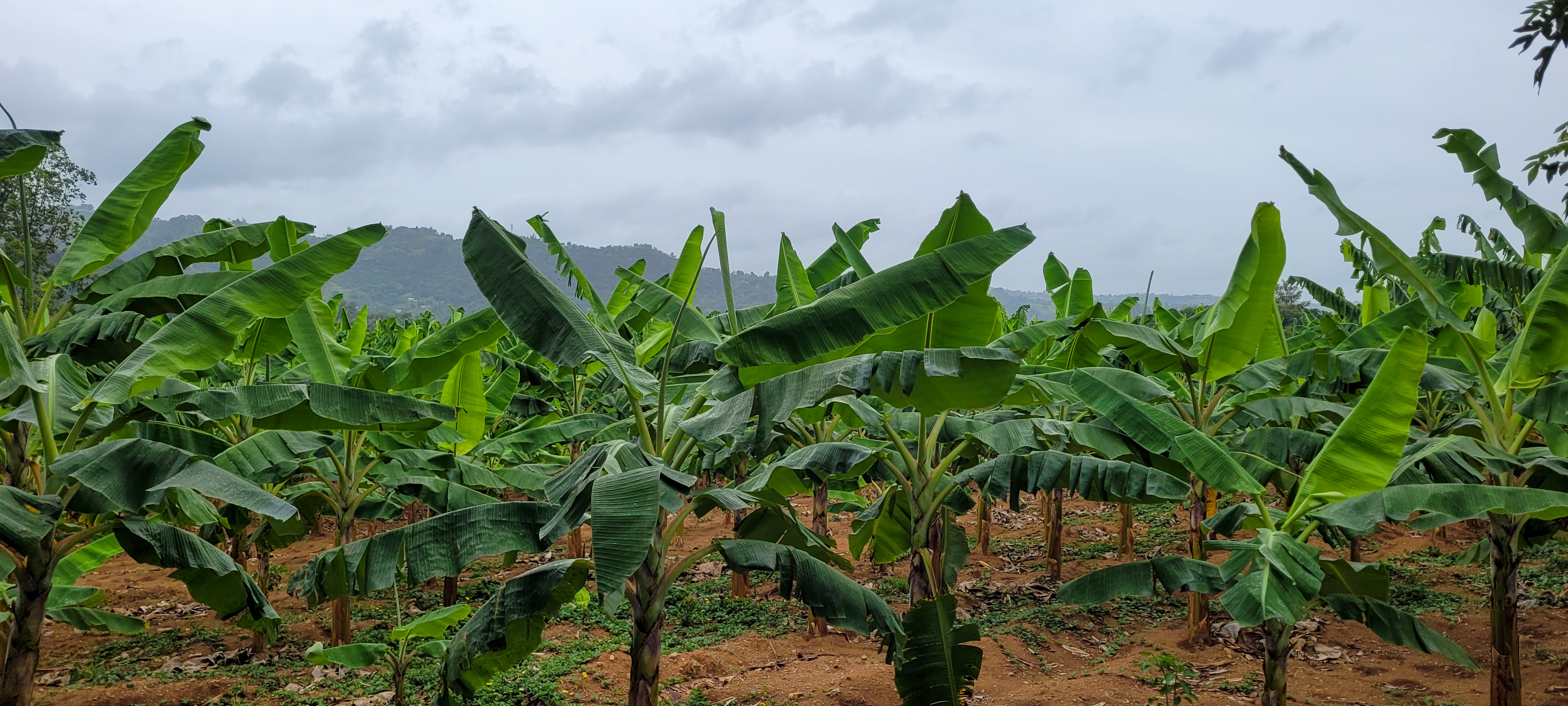
- Plantain cultivation in Palmarejo

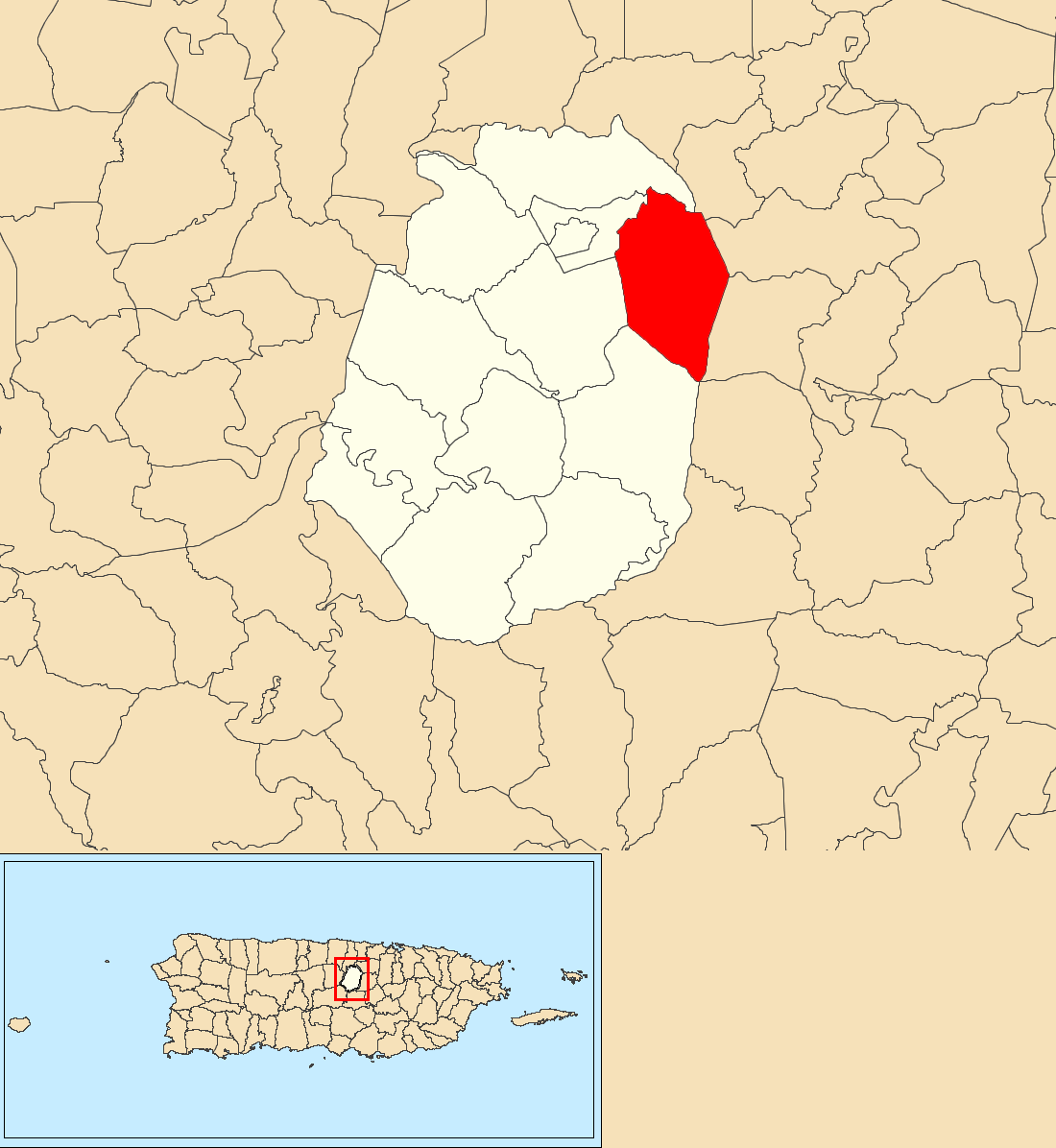
- Location of Palmarejo within the municipality of Corozal shown in red

- Location of Puerto Rico
- Coordinates: 18°19′45″N 66°17′32″W
- Commonwealth: Puerto Rico
- Municipality: Corozal

Area
  - Total: 3.86 sq mi (10.0 km^{2})
  - Land: 3.86 sq mi (10.0 km^{2})
  - Water: 0 sq mi (0 km^{2})
- Elevation: 735 ft (224 m)

Population (2010)
  - Total: 6,068
  - Density: 1,572/sq mi (607/km^{2})
- Source: 2010 Census
- Time zone: UTC−4 (AST)

Palmarejo is a rural barrio with an urban zone in the municipality of Corozal, Puerto Rico. Its population in 2010 was 6,068.

== History ==
Palmarejo was in Spain's gazetteers until Puerto Rico was ceded by Spain in the aftermath of the Spanish–American War under the terms of the Treaty of Paris of 1898 and became an unincorporated territory of the United States. In 1899, the United States Department of War conducted a census of Puerto Rico finding that the population of Palmarejo barrio was 901.

== Features and demographics ==
Palmarejo has 3.86 square miles (10.0 km^{2}) of land area and no water area. In 2010, its population was 6,068 with a population density of 1,572 inhabitants per square mile (607/km^{2}).

Historical population
Census	Pop.	Note	%±
1900	901		—
1910	1,182		31.2%
1920	1,177		−0.4%
1930	1,505		27.9%
1940	1,954		29.8%
1950	2,414		23.5%
1960	2,433		0.8%
1970	2,799		15.0%
1980	3,985		42.4%
1990	5,299		33.0%
2000	5,856		10.5%
2010	6,068		3.6%
U.S. Decennial Census; 1899 (shown as 1900) 1910-1930; 1930-1950 1980-2000 2010

PR-164 is the main east-west road through Palmarejo.

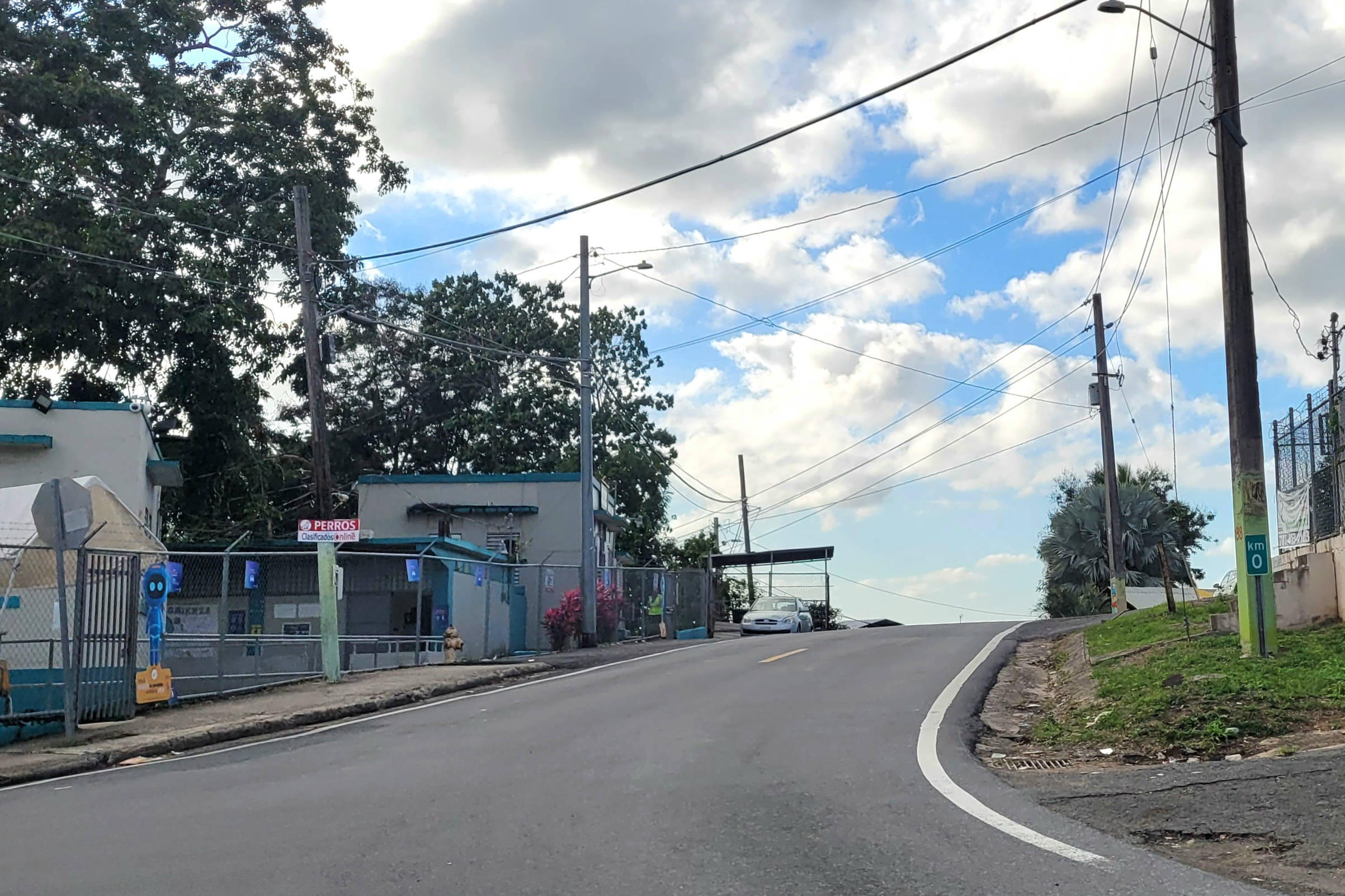
Puerto Rico Highway 803 in Palmarejo

== Mavilla Bridge ==
A bridge listed on the National Register of Historic Places in Puerto Rico is between Palmarejo barrio and Abras barrio, also in Corozal.

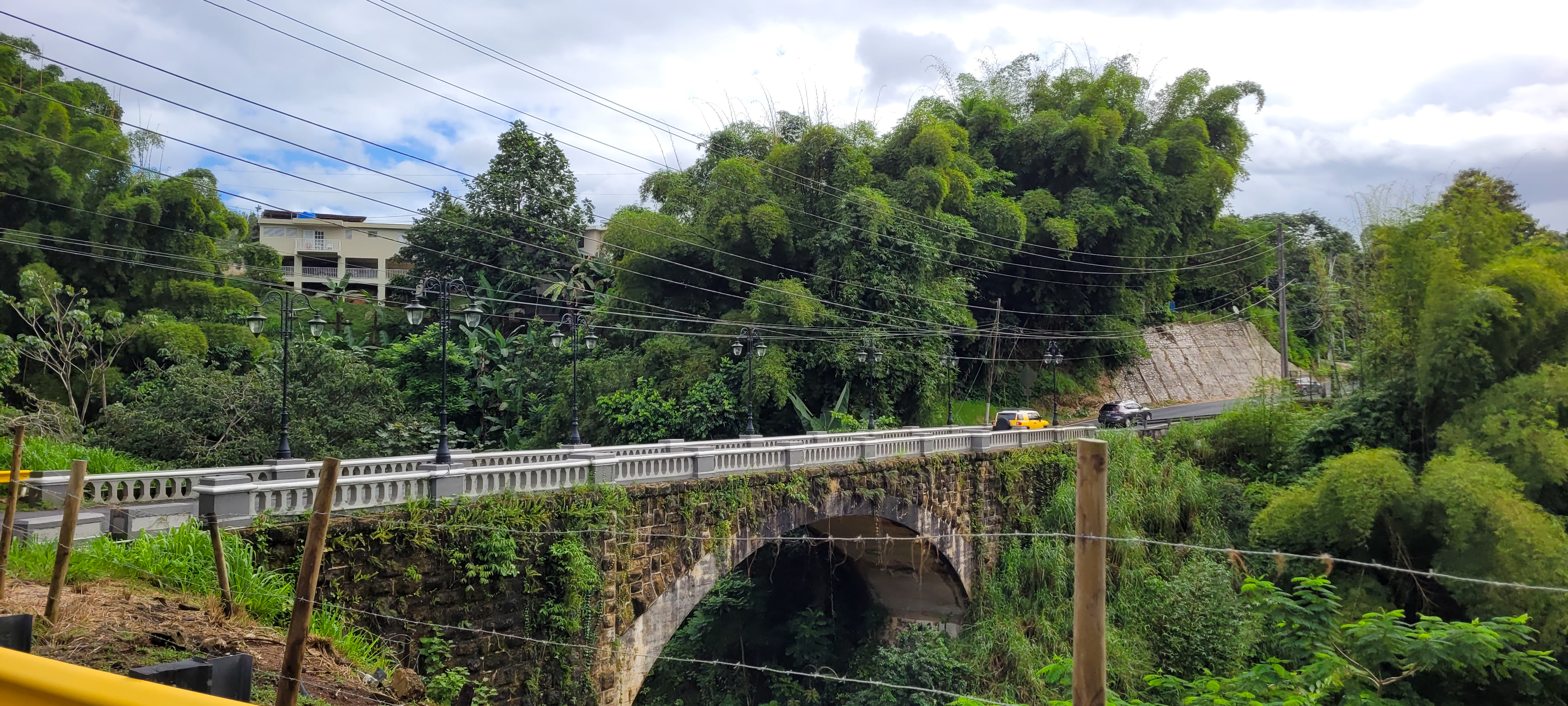
Mavilla Bridge (Ca. 2024)

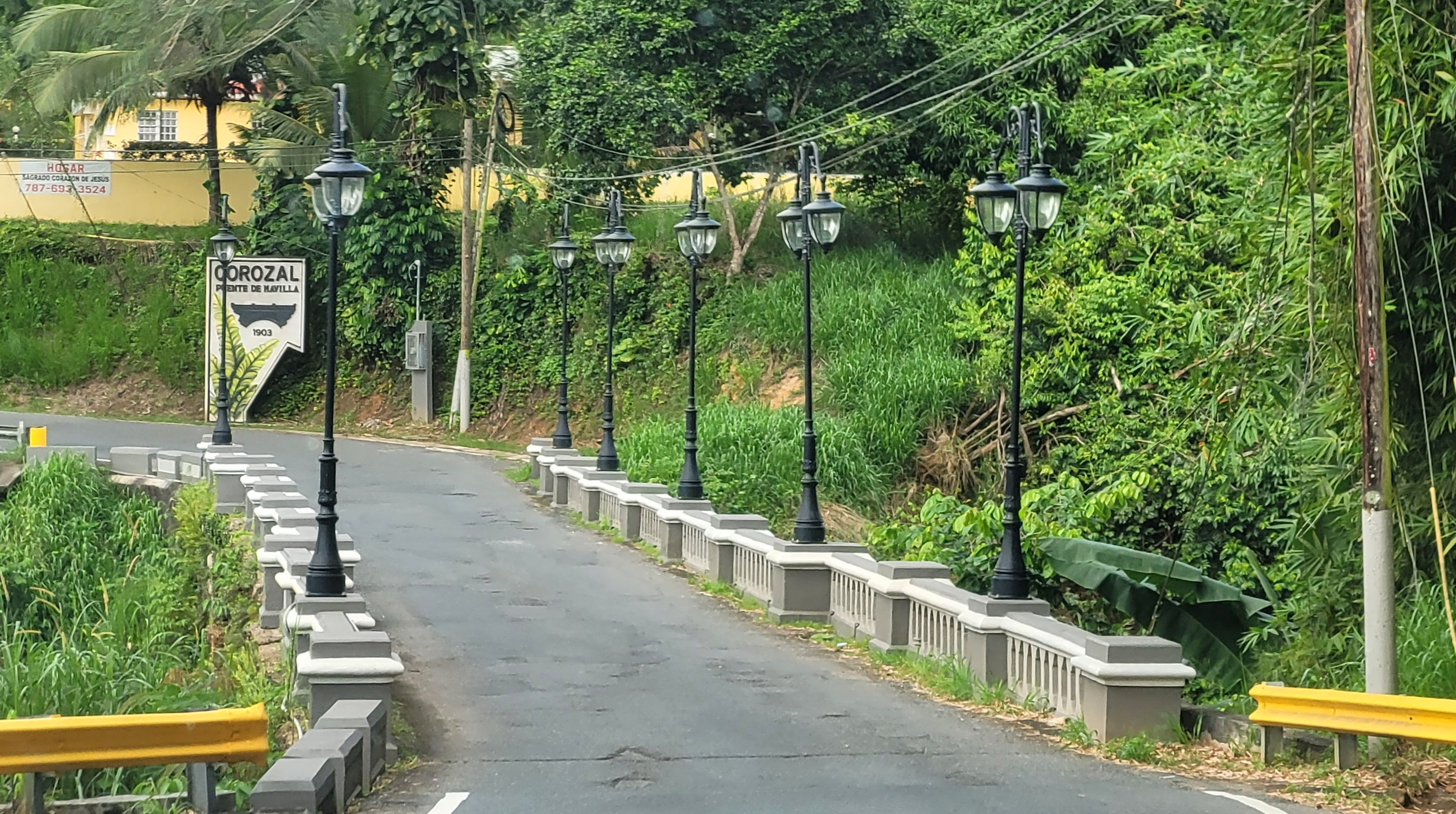
Mavilla Bridge looking west

== Sectors ==
Barrios (which are, in contemporary times, roughly comparable to minor civil divisions) in turn are further subdivided into smaller local populated place areas/units called sectores (sectors in English). The types of sectores may vary, from normally sector to urbanización to reparto to barriada to residencial, among others.

The following sectors are in Palmarejo barrio:

Barriada Decene, Calle Juana Santiago, Parcelas Guarico, Parcelas Julián Marrero, Sector Alejo Rosado, Sector Alturas de Corozal, Sector Chary, Sector Cheo Marrero, Sector Club de Leones, Sector Corozal Hills, Sector Cuchillas, Sector Dolores Cosme, Sector El Convento, Sector El Picuíto, Sector El Pomito, Sector El Rancho, Sector Félix Padilla, Sector Guarico, Sector Juana Santiago, Sector La Buruquena, Sector La Gallera, Sector La Mina, Sector Los Fonseca, Sector Los Llanos, Sector Los Negrones, Sector Los Nieves (from cemetery to La Gallera), Sector Los Panzardi, Sector Los Rojas, Sector Luis Collazo, Sector Marrero, Sector Pancho Febus, Sector Pomo Rodríguez, Sector Tom Rolón, Sector Toño Patente, Urbanización Estancias de Palmarejo, Urbanización Los Policías, and Urbanización María del Carmen.

== See also ==
- List of communities in Puerto Rico
- List of barrios and sectors of Corozal, Puerto Rico
