= Cedro Arriba =

Barrio of Naranjito, Puerto Rico

- Barrio
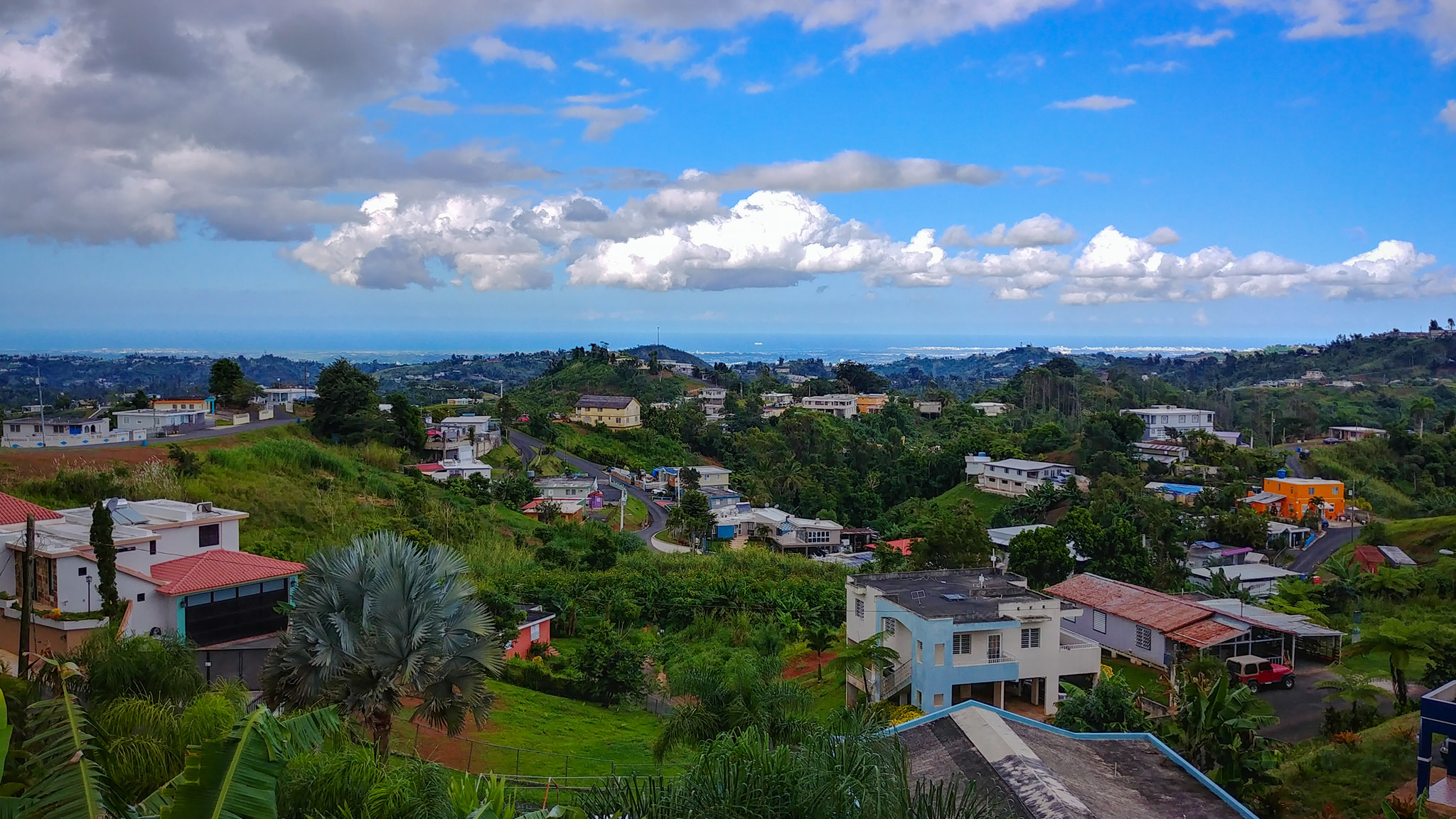
- Looking north from Cedro Arriba

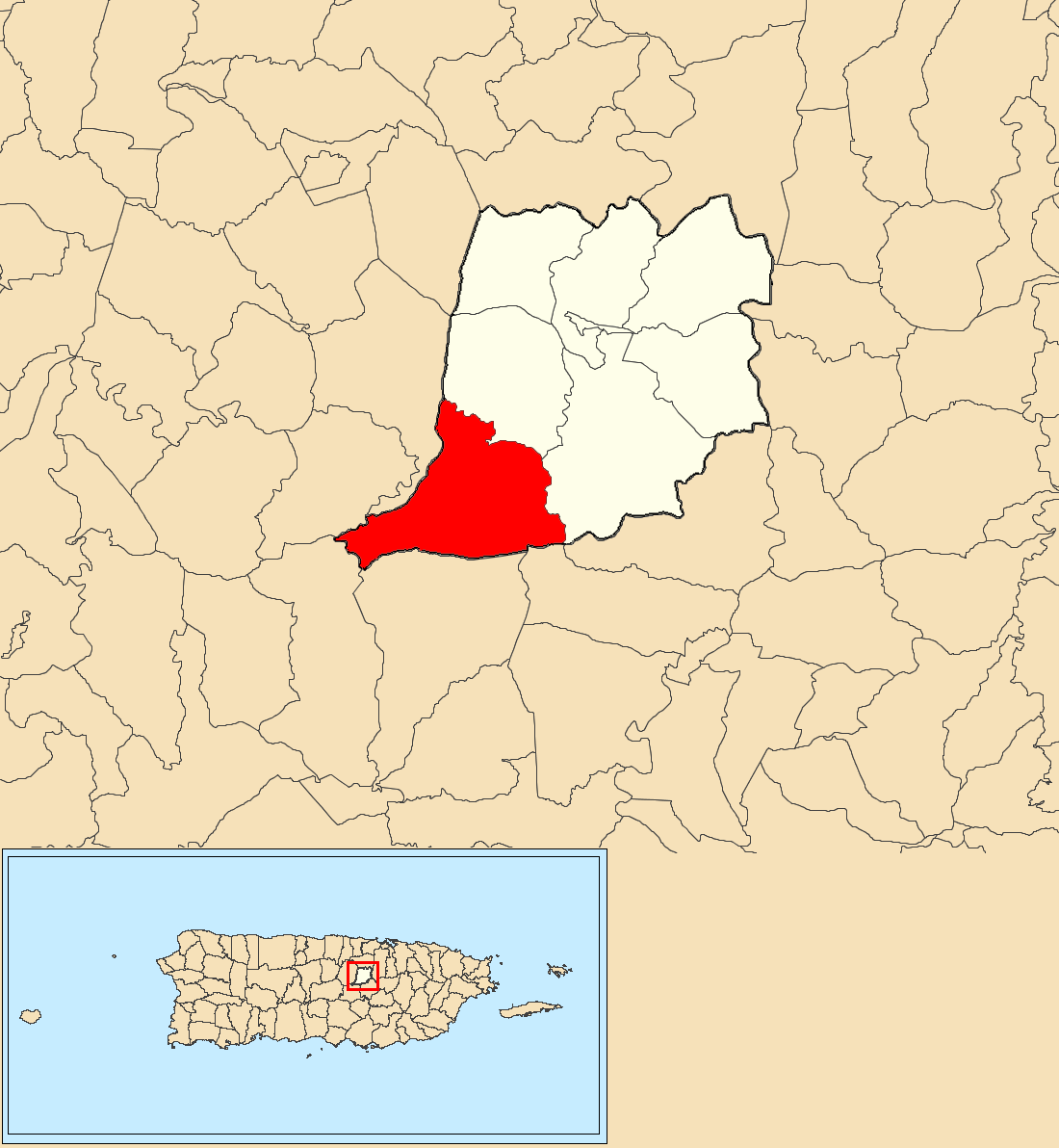
- Location of Cedro Arriba within the municipality of Naranjito shown in red

- Location of Puerto Rico
- Coordinates: 18°15′27″N 66°16′50″W
- Commonwealth: Puerto Rico
- Municipality: Naranjito

Area
  - Total: 5.29 sq mi (13.7 km^{2})
  - Land: 5.29 sq mi (13.7 km^{2})
  - Water: 0 sq mi (0 km^{2})
- Elevation: 1,722 ft (525 m)

Population (2010)
  - Total: 3,876
  - Density: 732.7/sq mi (282.9/km^{2})
- Source: 2010 Census
- Time zone: UTC−4 (AST)
- ZIP code: 00719
- Area code: 787/939

Cedro Arriba is a barrio in the municipality of Naranjito, Puerto Rico. Its population in 2010 was 3,876.

== History ==
Cedro Arriba was in Spain's gazetteers until Puerto Rico was ceded by Spain in the aftermath of the Spanish–American War under the terms of the Treaty of Paris of 1898 and became an unincorporated territory of the United States. In 1899, the United States Department of War conducted a census of Puerto Rico finding that the population of Cedro Arriba barrio was 915. Some of the sectors within this barrio receive water service from a private system, and not from Puerto Rico Aqueducts and Sewers Authority.

Historical population
Census	Pop.	Note	%±
1900	915		—
1910	686		−25.0%
1920	747		8.9%
1930	778		4.1%
1940	917		17.9%
1950	1,292		40.9%
1960	1,343		3.9%
1970	1,830		36.3%
1980	2,281		24.6%
1990	2,987		31.0%
2000	3,556		19.0%
2010	3,876		9.0%
U.S. Decennial Census; 1899 (shown as 1900) 1910-1930; 1930-1950 1980-2000 2010

== Sectors ==
Barrios (which are, in contemporary times, roughly comparable to minor civil divisions) in turn are further subdivided into smaller local populated place areas/units called sectores (sectors in English). The types of sectores may vary, from normally sector to urbanización to reparto to barriada to residencial, among others.

The following sectors are in Cedro Arriba barrio:

El Abanico, Sector Ángel Avilés, Sector Cabrera, Sector El Banco, Sector El Pueblito, Sector El Riíto, Sector Feijoó Anones, Sector Feijoó Cedro Arriba, Sector Ferrer, Sector La Gallera, Sector La Pajona, Sector Las Cruces, Sector Loncho López, Sector Los López, Sector Los Morales, Sector Los Pomos, Sector Los Ríos, Sector Los Zayas, Sector Maná, Sector Moncho Rodríguez, Sector Peñabert, Sector San Antonio, Sector Sánchez, Sector Santa Rita, Sector Tiñín Ortega, and Sector Xanadú.

== Gallery ==
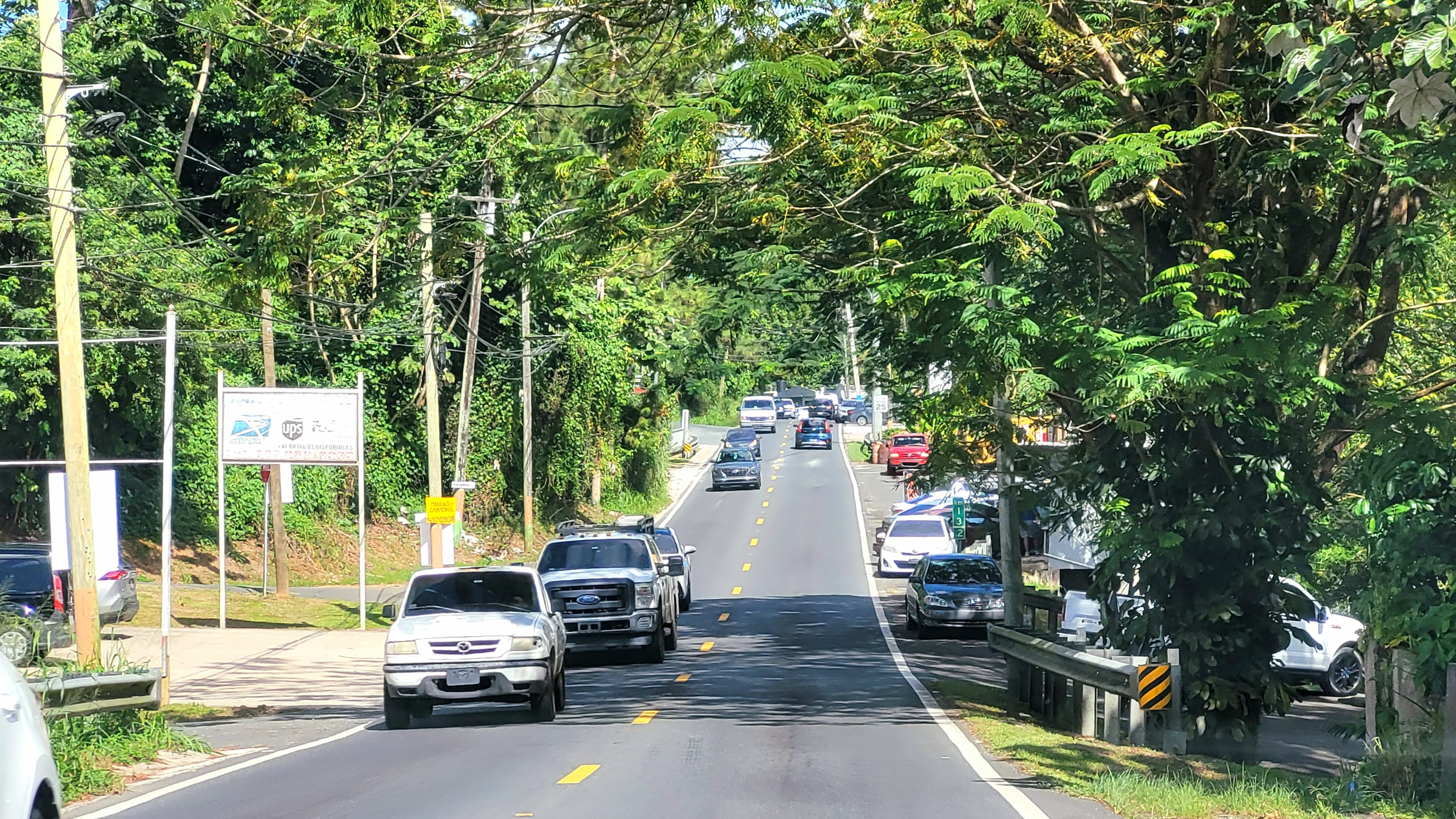
Puerto Rico Highway 152 in Cedro Arriba

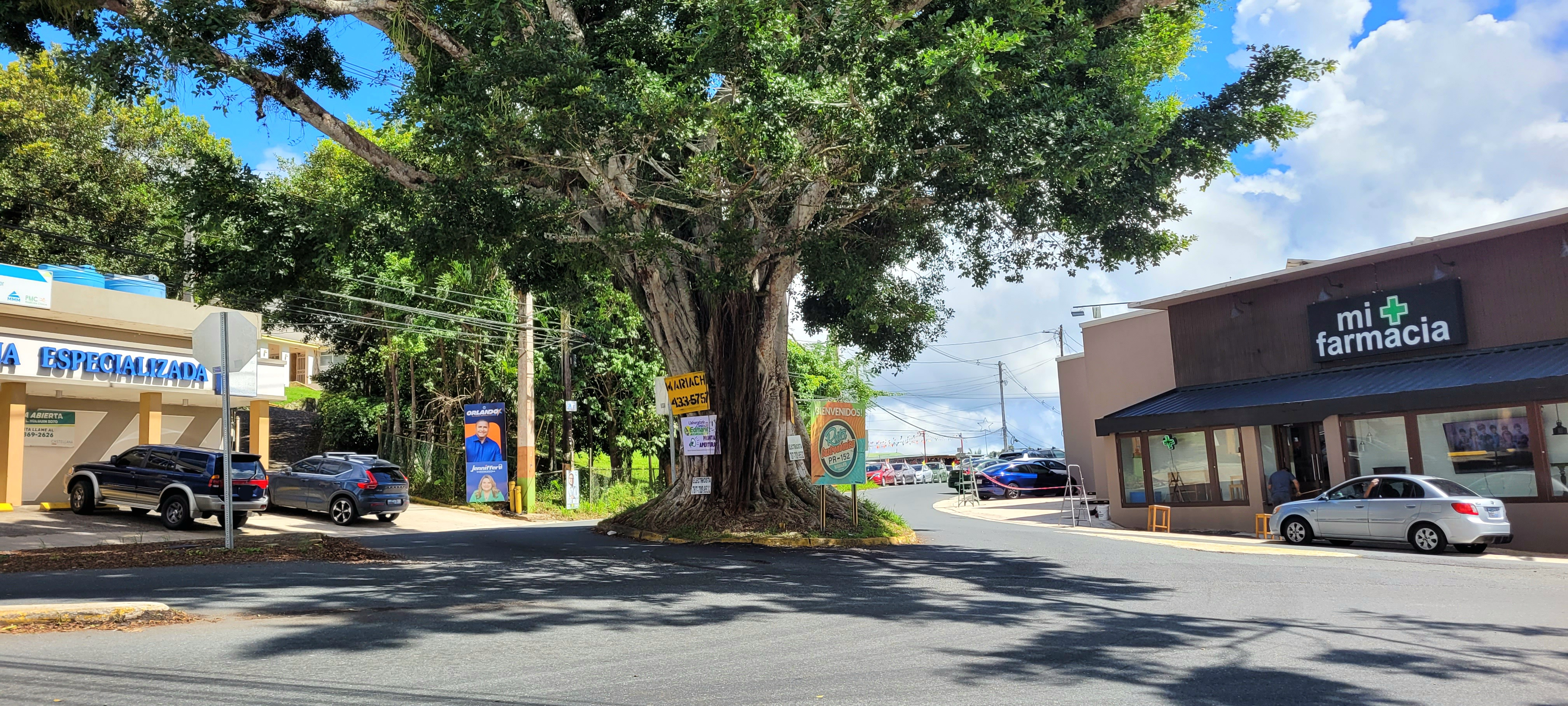
Puerto Rico Highway 779 in Cedro Arriba

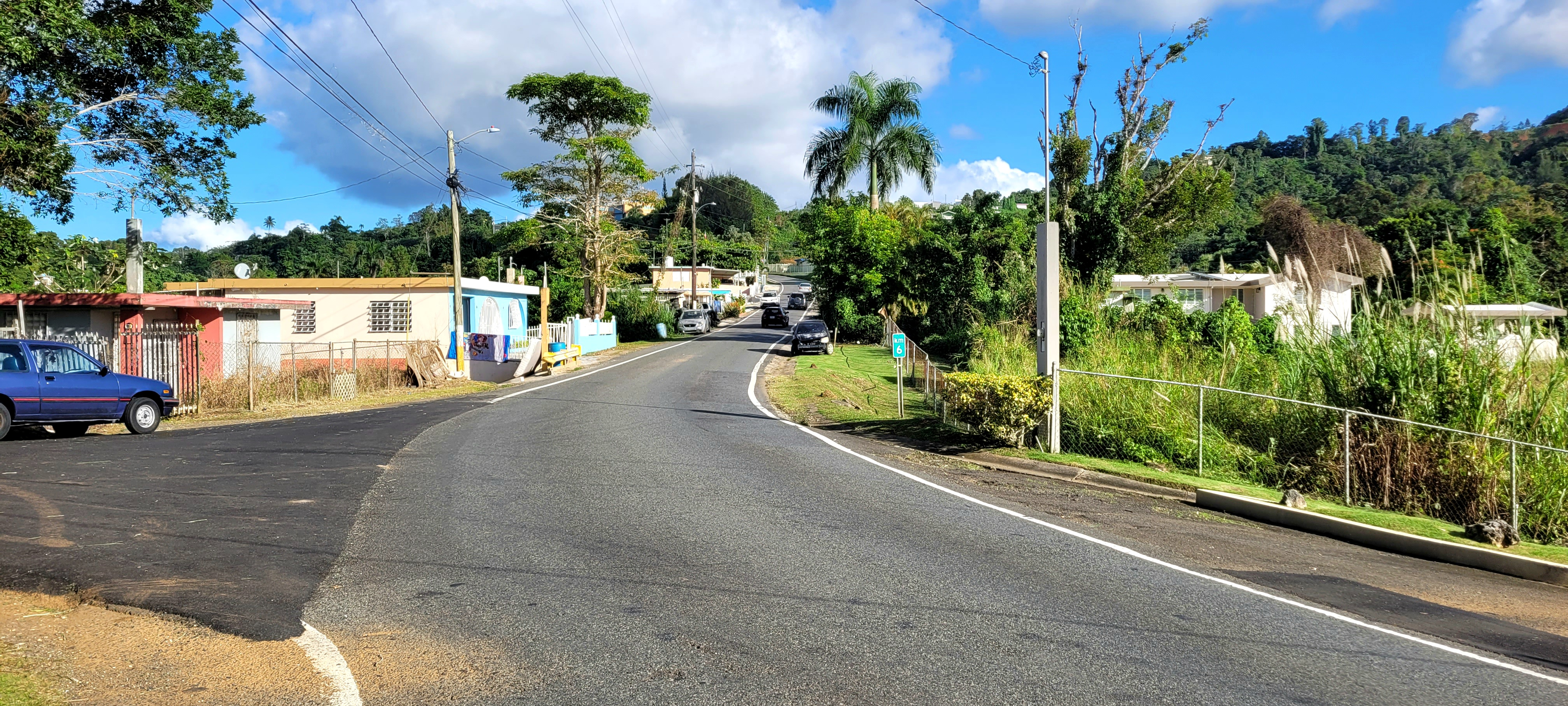
Puerto Rico Highway 802 in Cedro Arriba

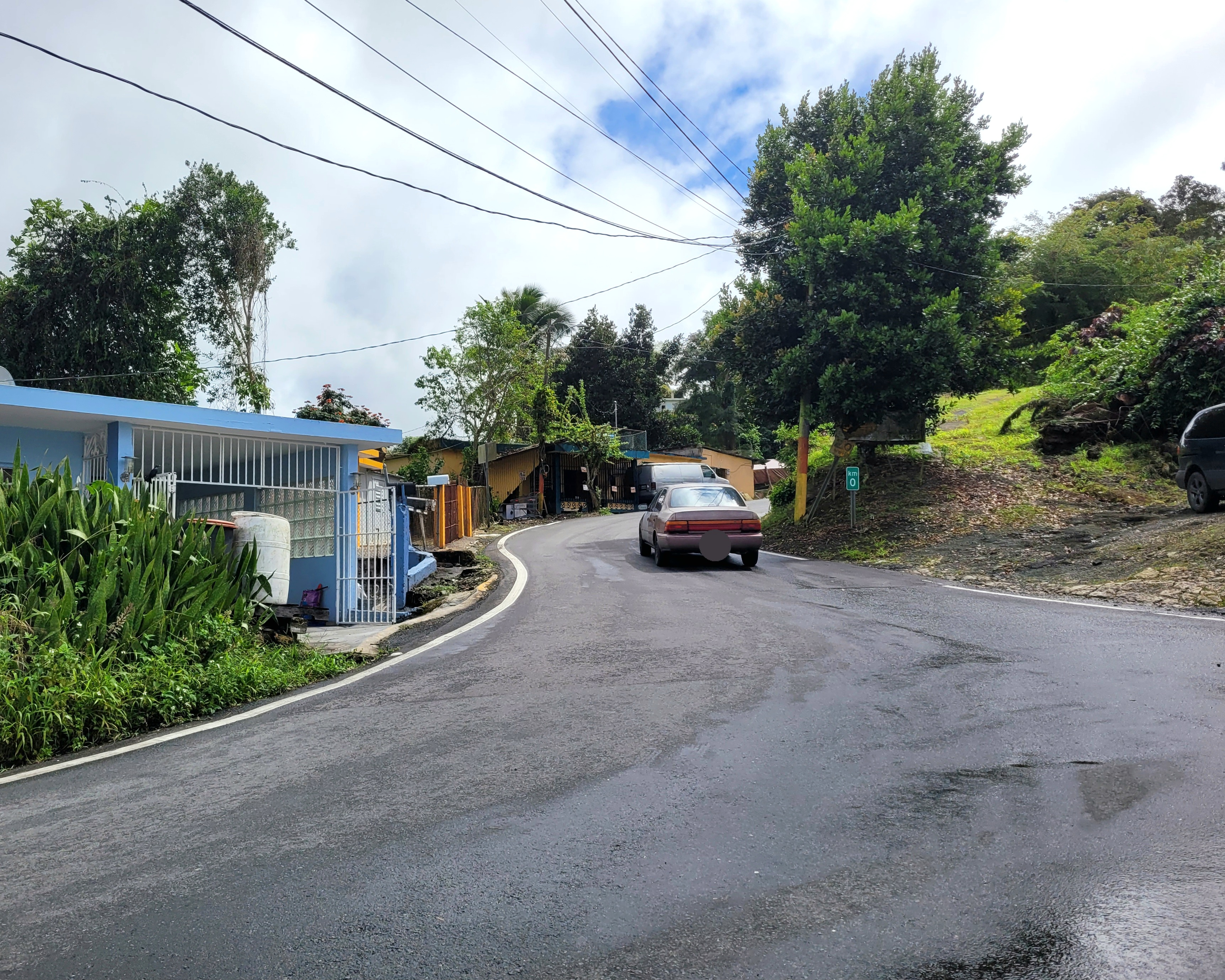
Puerto Rico Highway 809 in Cedro Arriba

== See also ==
- List of communities in Puerto Rico
- List of barrios and sectors of Naranjito, Puerto Rico
