= Palos Blancos, Corozal, Puerto Rico =

Barrio of Puerto Rico

Palos Blancos
- Barrio
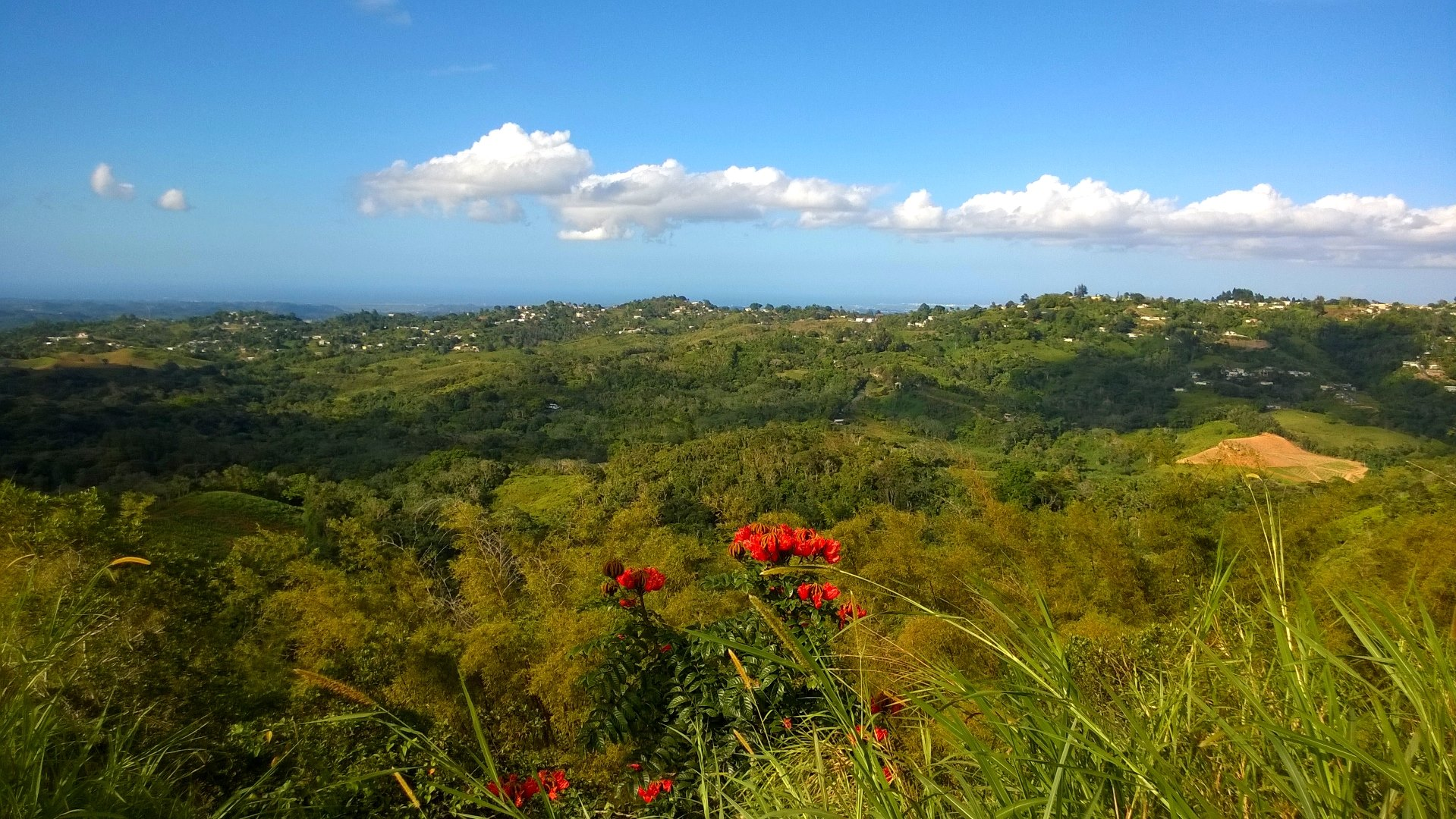
- View from Palos Blancos

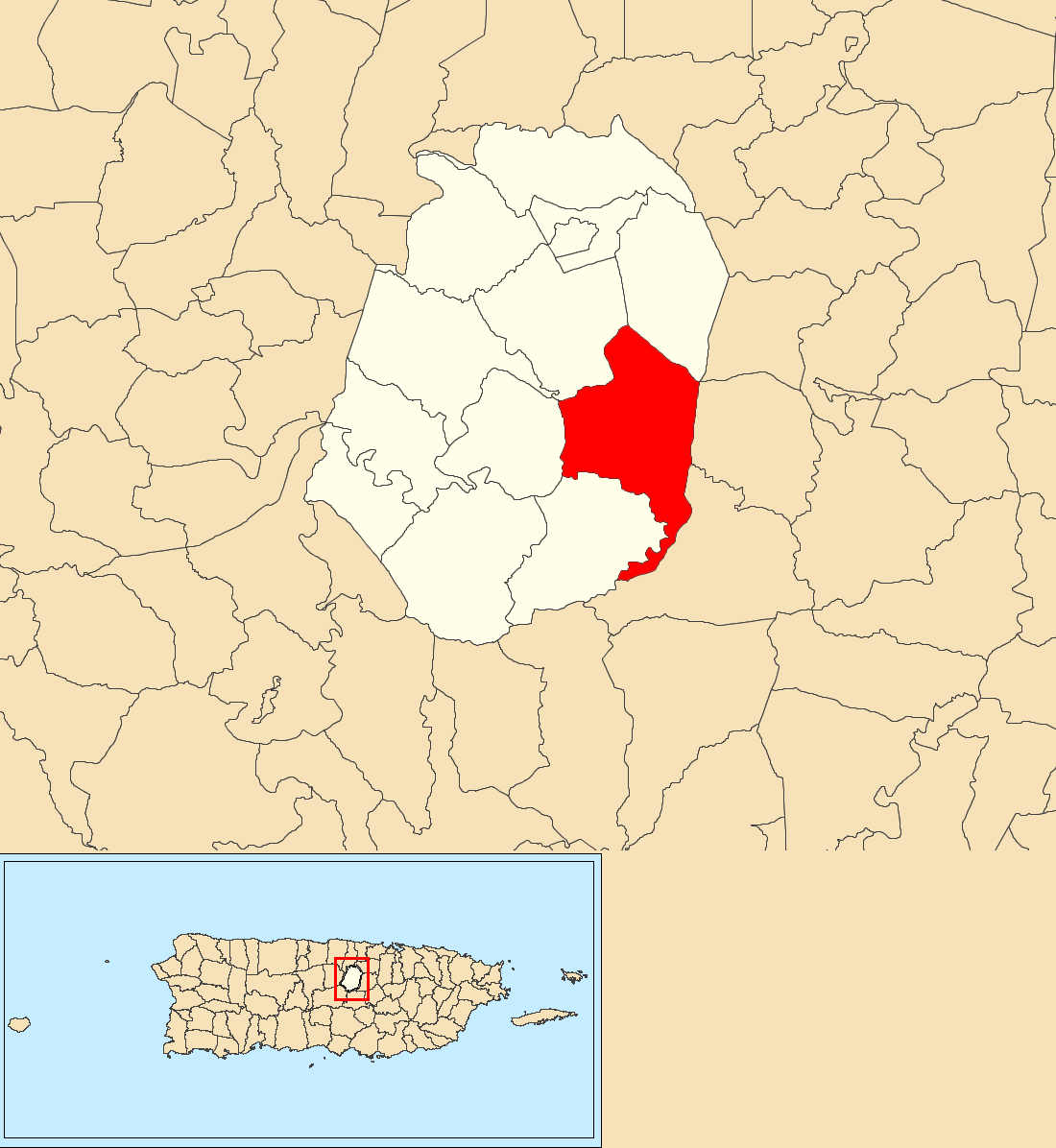
- Location of Palos Blancos within the municipality of Corozal shown in red

- Location of Puerto Rico
- Coordinates: 18°17′27″N 66°18′09″W
- Commonwealth: Puerto Rico
- Municipality: Corozal

Area
  - Total: 4.98 sq mi (12.9 km^{2})
  - Land: 4.98 sq mi (12.9 km^{2})
  - Water: 0 sq mi (0 km^{2})
- Elevation: 1,345 ft (410 m)

Population (2010)
  - Total: 3,458
  - Density: 695.8/sq mi (268.6/km^{2})
- Source: 2010 Census
- Time zone: UTC−4 (AST)

Palos Blancos is a rural barrio in the municipality of Corozal, Puerto Rico. Its population in 2010 was 3,458.

== History ==
Palos Blancos was in Spain's gazetteers until Puerto Rico was ceded by Spain in the aftermath of the Spanish–American War under the terms of the Treaty of Paris of 1898 and became an unincorporated territory of the United States. In 1899, the United States Department of War conducted a census of Puerto Rico finding that the population of Palos Blancos barrio was 1,367.

== Features and demographics ==
Palos Blancos has 4.98 square miles (12.9 km^{2}) of land area and no water area. In 2010, its population was 3,458 with a population density of 695.8 inhabitants per square mile (268.6/km^{2}).

Historical population
Census	Pop.	Note	%±
1900	1,367		—
1910	1,479		8.2%
1920	1,520		2.8%
1930	1,552		2.1%
1940	1,897		22.2%
1950	2,229		17.5%
1960	2,533		13.6%
1970	2,143		−15.4%
1980	2,355		9.9%
1990	2,919		23.9%
2000	3,664		25.5%
2010	3,458		−5.6%
U.S. Decennial Census; 1899 (shown as 1900) 1910-1930; 1930-1950 1980-2000 2010

PR-803 is the main north-south road through Palos Blacos.

== Monte Choca State Forest ==
Located in Palos Blancos barrio is Monte Choca State Forest which was declared a state forest with law # 295 on November 21, 2003. Its area is about 244.76 acres and it is located at one of the highest elevations in Corozal.

== Sectors ==
Barrios (which are, in contemporary times, roughly comparable to minor civil divisions) in turn are further subdivided into smaller local populated place areas/units called sectores (sectors in English). The types of sectores may vary, from normally sector to urbanización to reparto to barriada to residencial, among others.

The following sectors are in Palos Blancos barrio:

Parcelas Medina, Sector Amado Suárez, Sector Baldino Ortiz, Sector Carretera (from Ángel Vázquez to Manuel Ortiz), Sector Colón, Sector Demetrio Pacheco, Sector El Cacique, Sector El Pegao, Sector El Siete (7), Sector Gobeo, Sector Héctor Ortiz, Sector La Arena, Sector La Loma, Sector La Perla, Sector La Pollera, Sector La Quinta, Sector La Riviera, Sector La Vega, Sector Lino Caldero, Sector Los Morales, Sector Los Rodríguez, Sector Los Bagué, Sector Los Febus, Sector Los Guzmanes, Sector Los Morales (Emérito), Sector Los Padilla, Sector Los Ramos, Sector Los Ruiz, Sector Los Velilla, Sector Maná, Sector Manuel Ortiz, Sector Marcelino López, Sector Nono Negrón, Sector Pepe Córdova, Sector Pepín Rodríguez, Sector Quiliche, Sector Rolo Pacheco, Sector Pura Molina, Sector Tato López, Sector Varela, and Sector Virella.

== Gallery ==
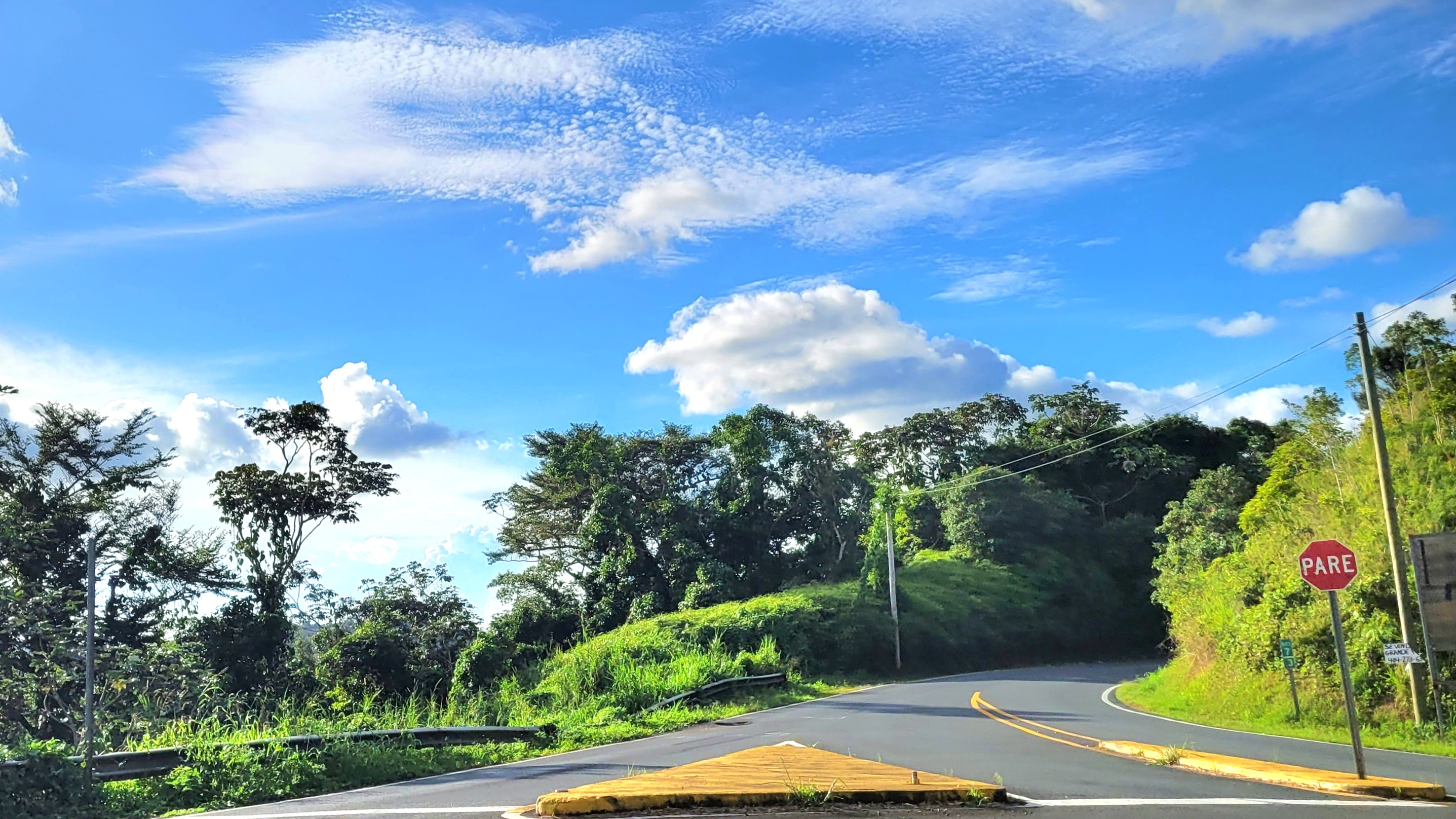
Puerto Rico Highway 805 in Palos Blancos

Puerto Rico Highway 808 in Palos Blancos

== See also ==
- List of communities in Puerto Rico
- List of barrios and sectors of Corozal, Puerto Rico
