= Maná, Corozal, Puerto Rico =

Barrio of Puerto Rico

Maná
- Barrio
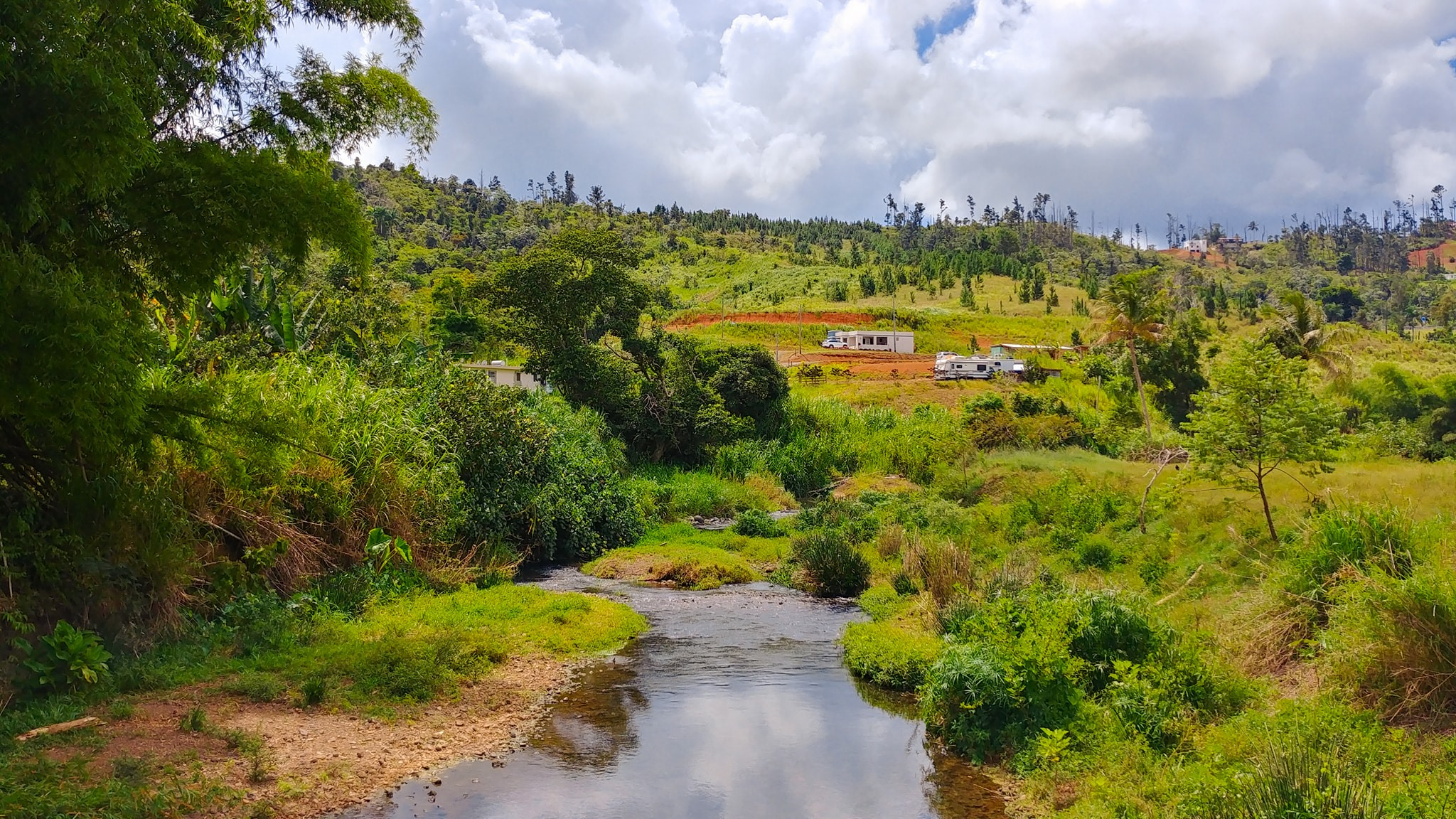
- Río Grande de Manatí in Maná

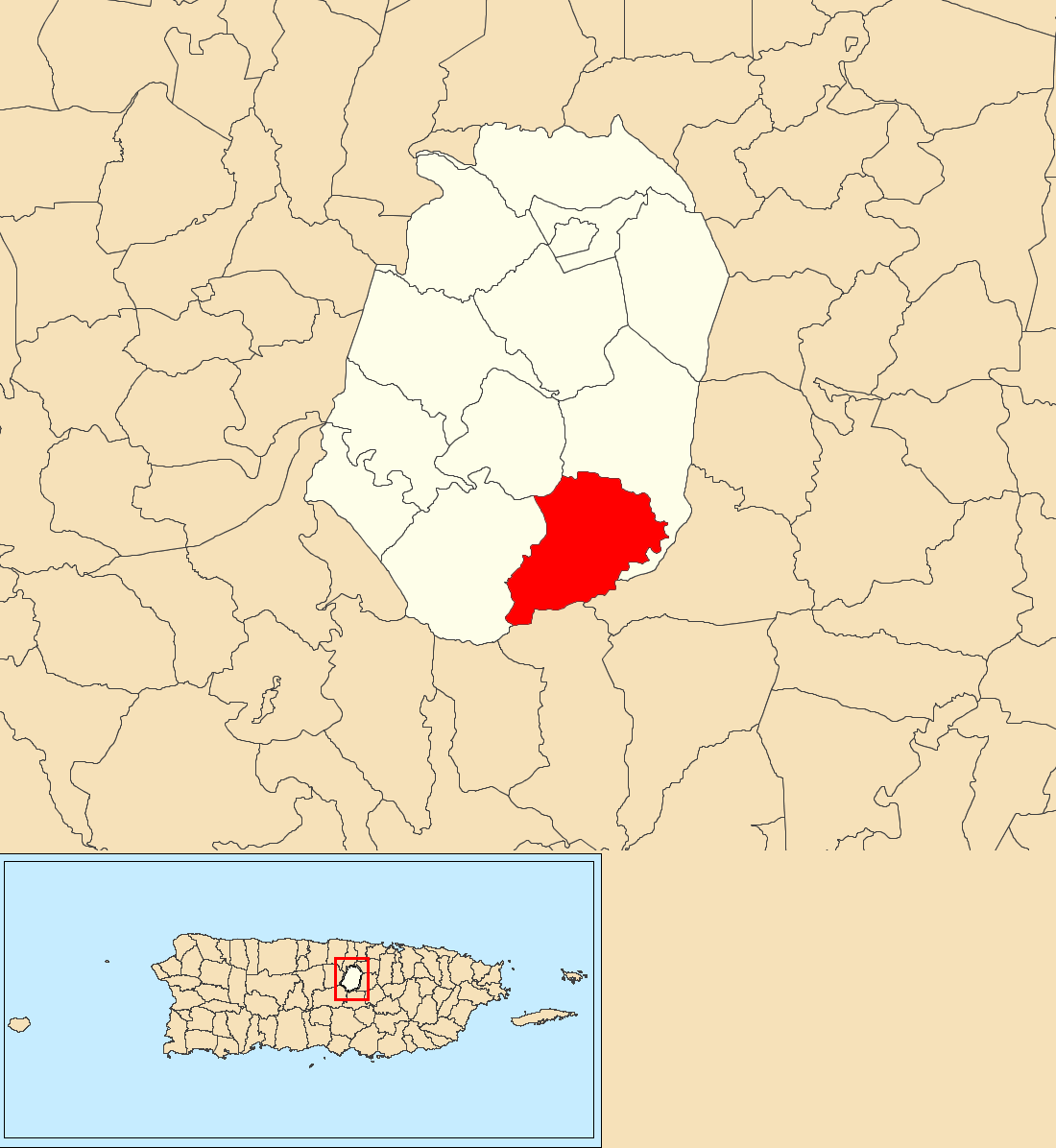
- Location of Maná within the municipality of Corozal shown in red

- Location of Puerto Rico
- Coordinates: 18°15′56″N 66°18′33″W
- Commonwealth: Puerto Rico
- Municipality: Corozal

Area
  - Total: 3.86 sq mi (10.0 km^{2})
  - Land: 3.86 sq mi (10.0 km^{2})
  - Water: 0 sq mi (0 km^{2})
- Elevation: 1,785 ft (544 m)

Population (2010)
  - Total: 2,093
  - Density: 542.2/sq mi (209.3/km^{2})
- Source: 2010 Census
- Time zone: UTC−4 (AST)

Maná is a rural barrio in the municipality of Corozal, Puerto Rico. Its population in 2010 was 2,093.

== History ==
Maná was in Spain's gazetteers until Puerto Rico was ceded by Spain in the aftermath of the Spanish–American War under the terms of the Treaty of Paris of 1898 and became an unincorporated territory of the United States. In 1899, the United States Department of War conducted a census of Puerto Rico finding that the population of Maná was 1,133.

== Features and demographics ==
Maná has 3.86 square miles (10.0 km^{2}) of land area and no water area. In 2010, its population was 2,093 with a population density of 542.2 inhabitants per square mile (209.3/km^{2}).

Historical population
Census	Pop.	Note	%±
1900	1,133		—
1910	1,246		10.0%
1920	1,061		−14.8%
1930	1,111		4.7%
1940	1,292		16.3%
1950	1,159		−10.3%
1960	1,239		6.9%
1970	959		−22.6%
1980	1,257		31.1%
1990	1,761		40.1%
2000	2,014		14.4%
2010	2,093		3.9%
U.S. Decennial Census; 1899 (shown as 1900) 1910-1930; 1930-1950 1980-2000 2010

PR-802 is the main east–west road through Maná.

== Sectors ==
Barrios (which are, in contemporary times, roughly comparable to minor civil divisions) in turn are further subdivided into smaller local populated place areas/units called sectores (sectors in English). The types of sectores may vary, from normally sector to urbanización to reparto to barriada to residencial, among others.

The following sectors are in Maná barrio:

Sector Andreu, Sector Estancias de Maná, Sector Ferdinand Santiago, Sector La Escuela, Sector La Vega, Sector Los Berríos, Sector Los Berros, Sector Los Lozada, Sector Los Pilones, Sector Los Zayas, Sector Manchuria, Sector Monchito Pérez, Sector Pocito Dulce, Sector Quebrada Fría, Sector Varo Mercado, and Sector William Alvarado.

== See also ==
- List of communities in Puerto Rico
- List of barrios and sectors of Corozal, Puerto Rico
