= Puerto Rico Highway 568 =

Highway in Puerto Rico

Highway 568
- Ruta 568

Route information
- Maintained by Puerto Rico DTPW
- Length: 30.1 km (18.7 mi)
- Existed: 1953–present

Major junctions
- South end: PR-5155 in Orocovis–Orocovis barrio-pueblo
- PR-5555 in Orocovis; PR-772 in Botijas; PR-800 in Palmarito; PR-801 in Palmarito; PR-805 in Negros; PR-618 in Padilla; PR-5568 in Padilla
- North end: PR-159 in Padilla–Cibuco

Location
- Country: United States
- Territory: Puerto Rico
- Municipalities: Orocovis, Corozal

Highway system
- Roads in Puerto Rico; List
| ← PR-567 | → PR-577 |
| ← PR-5567 | PR-5568 | → PR-6111 |

Puerto Rico Highway 568 (PR-568) is a road that travels from the municipality of Orocovis to Corozal in Puerto Rico. With a length of 30.1 km (18.7 mi), it begins at its intersection with PR-5155 in downtown Orocovis and ends at PR-159 in western Corozal.

== Route description ==
This highway consists of one lane per direction for its entire length due to its rural characteristics. In Orocovis, it begins at PR-5155 in the municipal center and continues to the north, passing through Orocovis, Botijas and Mata de Cañas barrios before entering Corozal. In Corozal, PR-568 continues to the north on its way through Magueyes, Palmarito, Negros, Cuchillas and Padilla barrios until its end at PR-159 on the Padilla–Cibuco line.

Puerto Rico Highway 568 by municipality

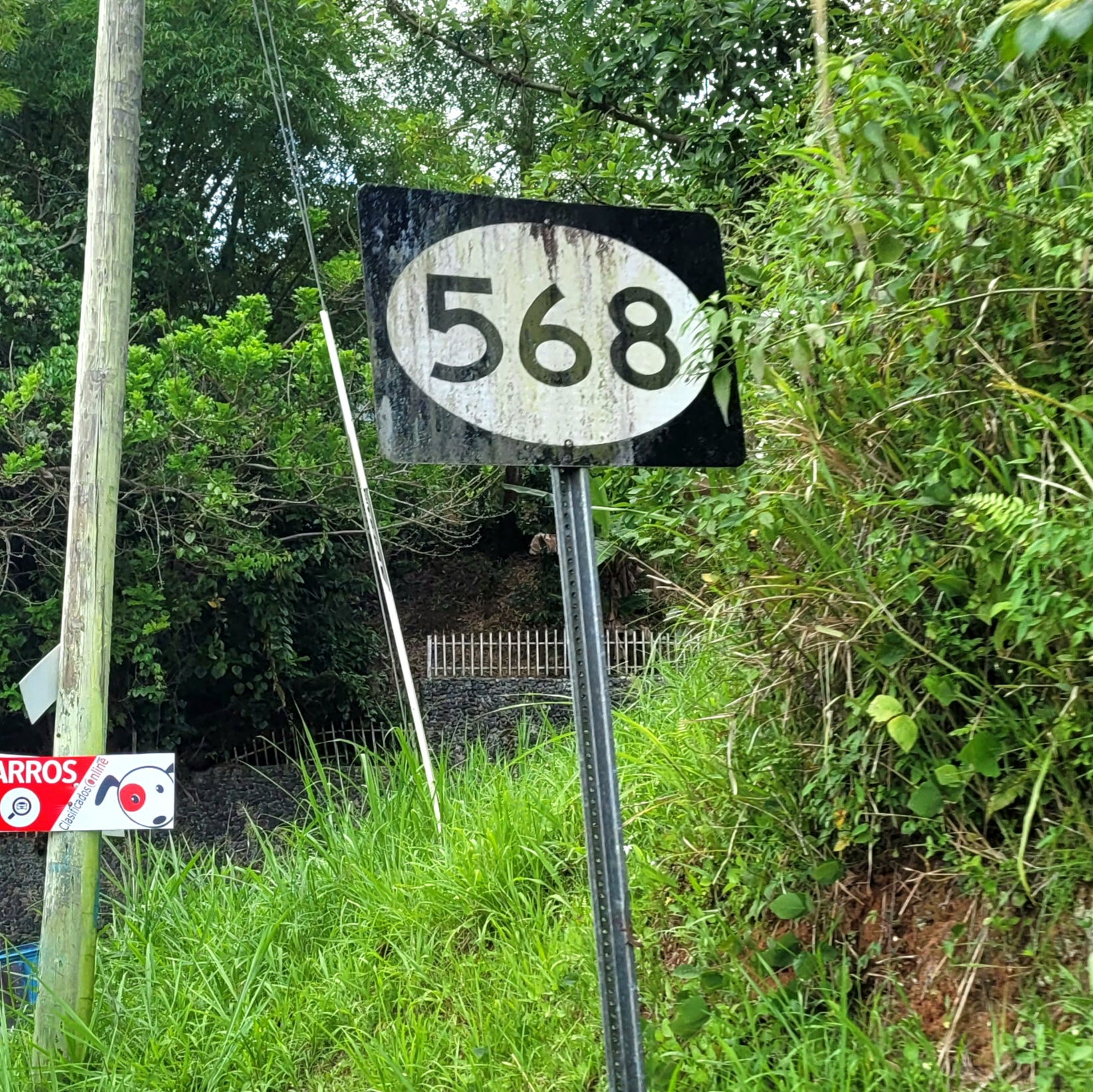
Northbound sign in Orocovis

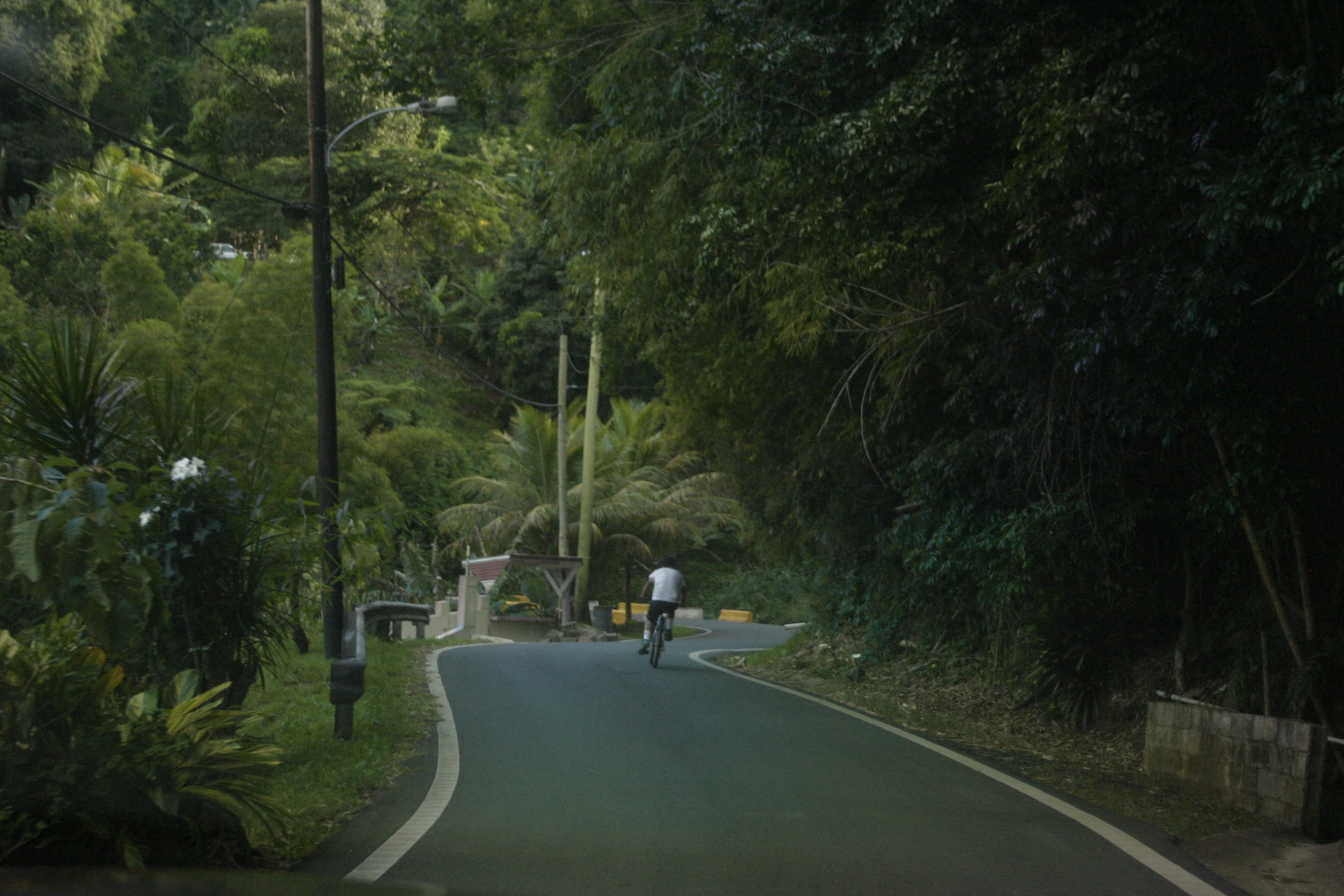
Curvy stretch in Orocovis

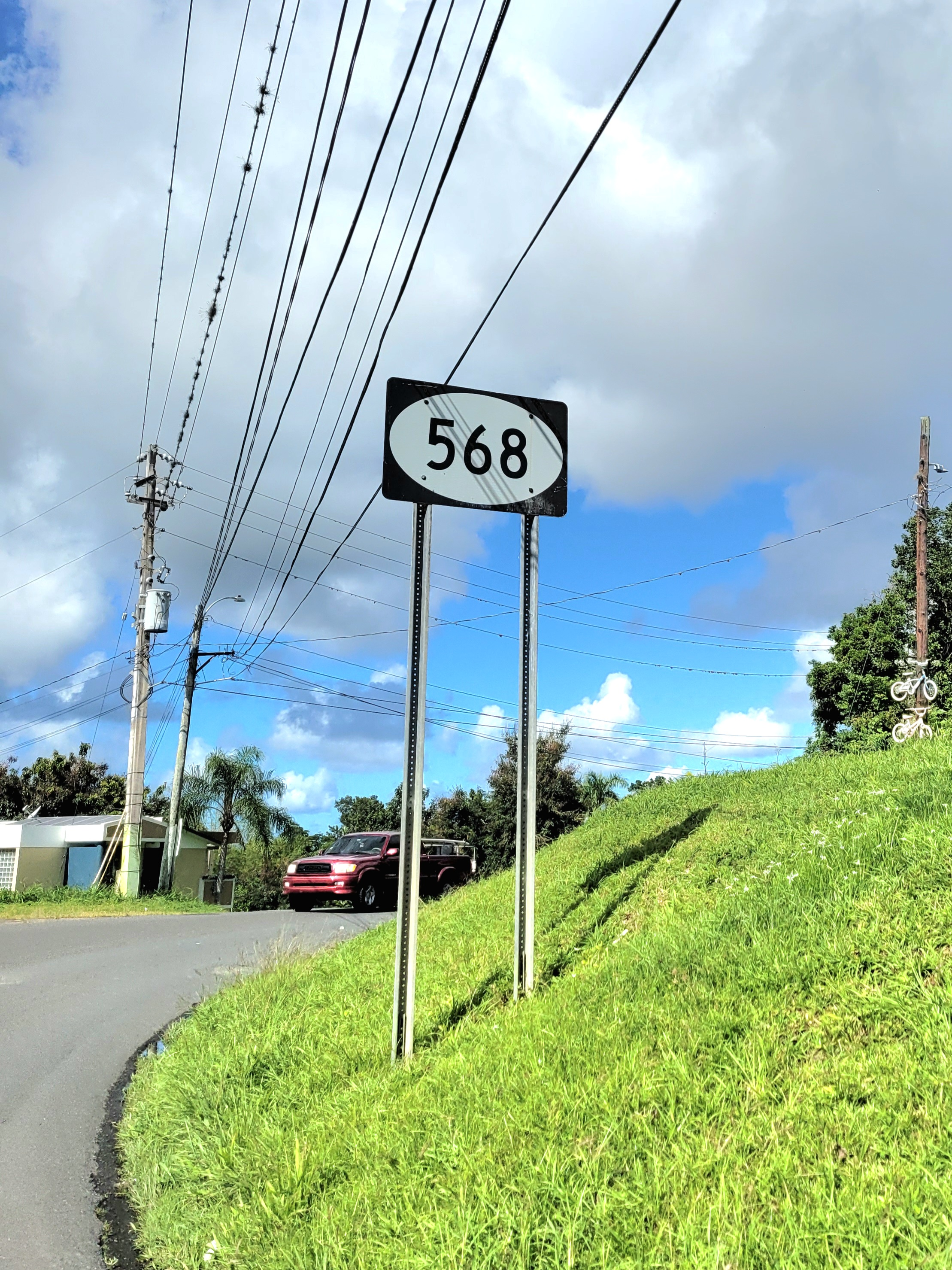
Heading north in Padilla, Corozal

=== Rivers crossed ===
Puerto Rico Highway 568 crosses the following rivers:

- Quebrada Grande (Salto Grande) in Corozal
- Quebrada Riachuelo in Corozal
- Río Botijas in Orocovis
- Río Grande de Manatí in Corozal

== History ==
The entire length of PR-568 is part of the old Road No. 10, a highway that led from Dorado to Coamo through Toa Alta, Corozal and Orocovis until the 1953 Puerto Rico highway renumbering, a process implemented by the Puerto Rico Department of Transportation and Public Works (Spanish: Departamento de Transportación y Obras Públicas) that increased the insular highway network to connect existing routes with different locations around Puerto Rico. Route 10 extended from PR-165 (old Road No. 2) near Toa Alta to PR-14 (former Road No. 1) in downtown Coamo. Its original way currently corresponds to PR-165, from PR-8865 in Dorado to PR-159 in Toa Alta; PR-159, from PR-165 in Toa Alta to PR-568 in Corozal, except in downtown area, where PR-891 replaces PR-159; PR-568, from PR-159 in Corozal to PR-5155 in Orocovis; PR-5155, from PR-568 north of downtown to PR-155 south of downtown, and PR-155, from PR-5155 in Orocovis to PR-14 in Coamo.

== Major intersections ==
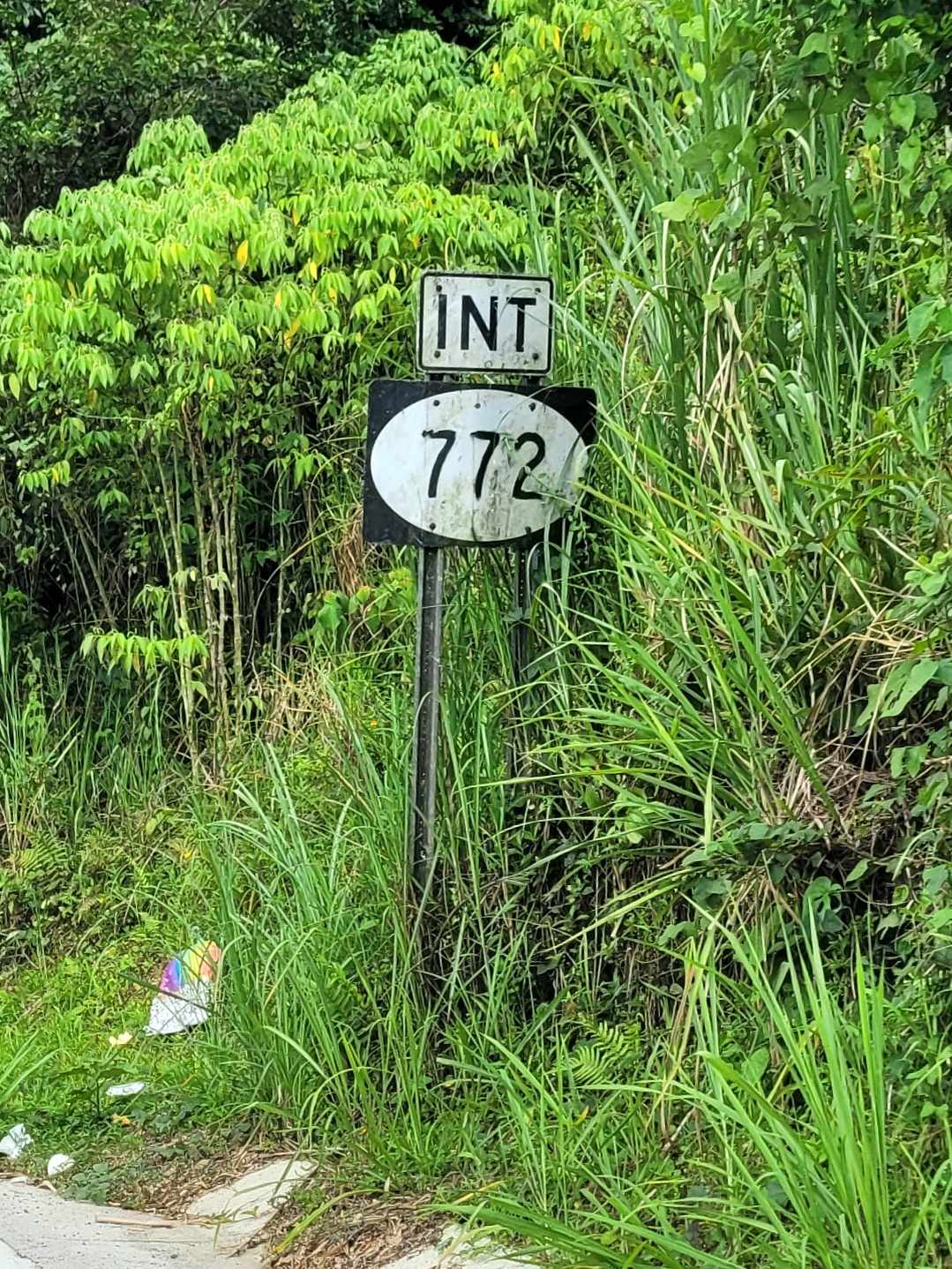
PR-568 north approaching PR-772 intersection in Botijas, Orocovis

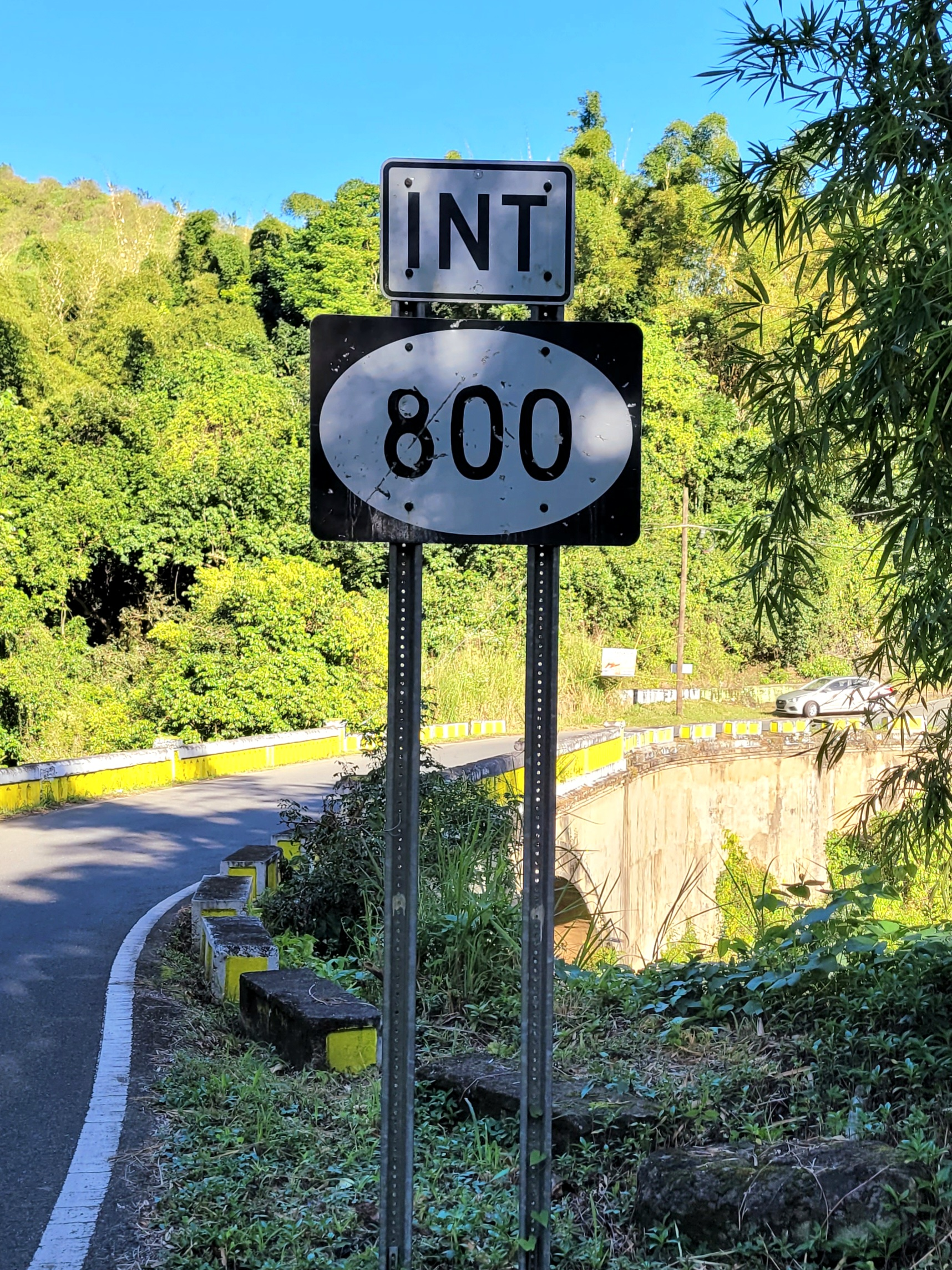
PR-568 south near PR-800 intersection in Palmarito, Corozal

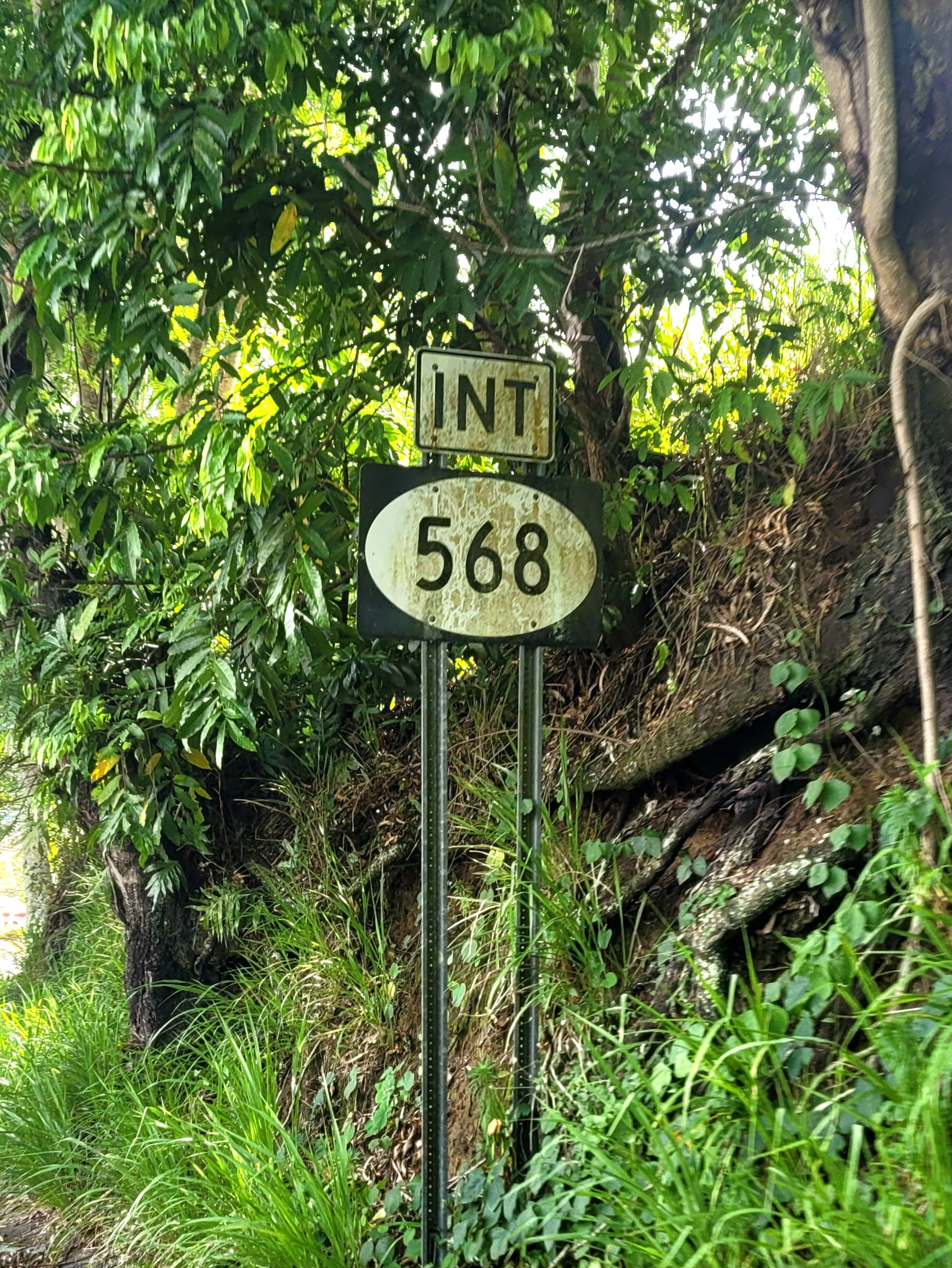
PR-801 west near PR-568 junction in Palmarito, Corozal

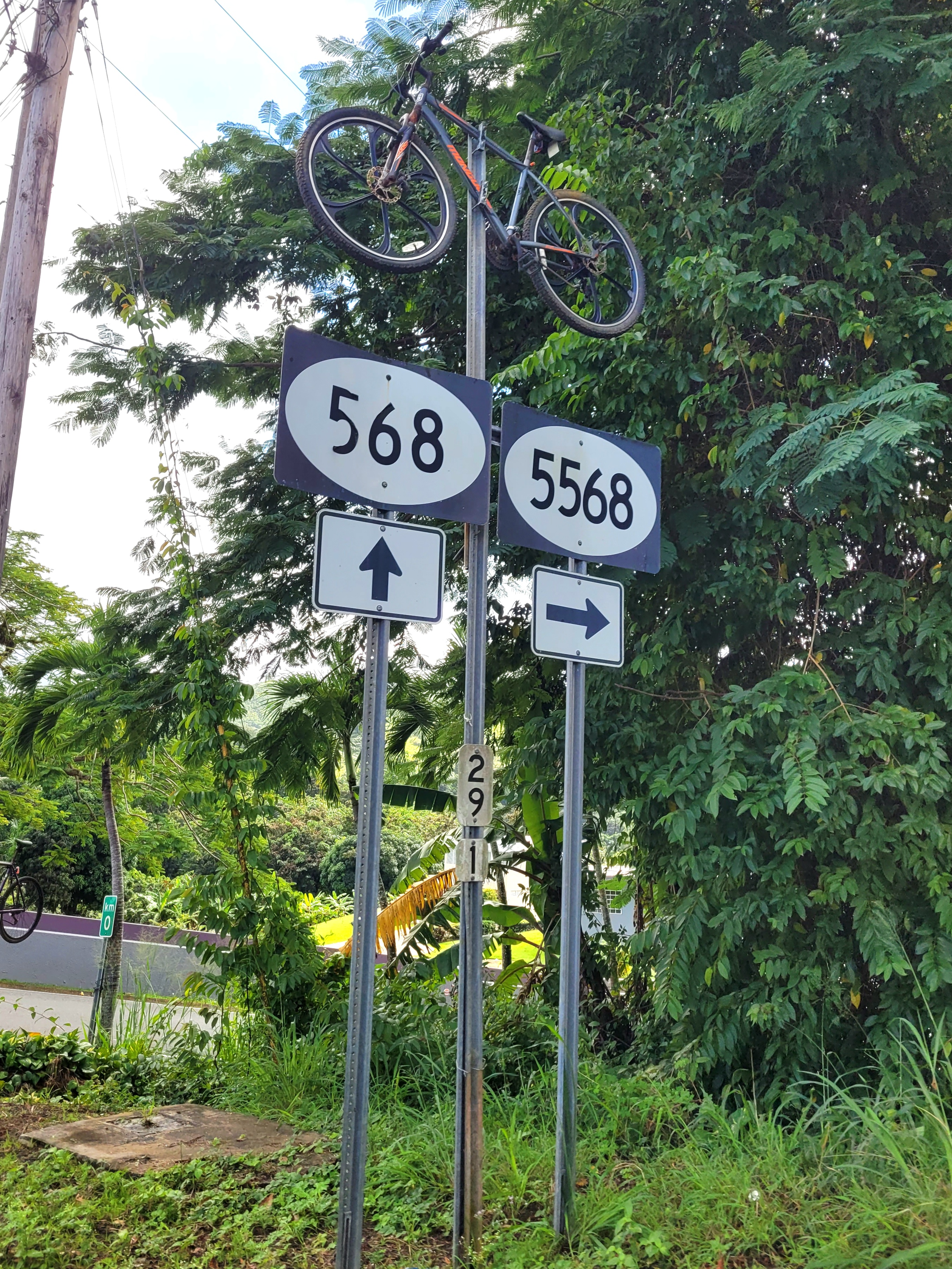
PR-568 south at the southern terminus of PR-5568 in Padilla, Corozal

| Municipality | Location | km | mi | Destinations | Notes |
|---|---|---|---|---|---|
| Orocovis | Orocovis–Orocovis barrio-pueblo line | 0.0 | 0.0 | PR-5155 – Orocovis | Southern terminus of PR-568 |
| Orocovis | Orocovis | 0.8 | 0.50 | PR-5555 (Desvío Juan Enrique "Quique" López Torres) to PR-155 – Morovis, Ciales, Coamo | |
| Orocovis | Botijas | 4.8 | 3.0 | PR-772 – Barranquitas, Botijas | |
| Corozal | No major junctions | | | | |
| Orocovis | No major junctions | | | | |
| Corozal | Palmarito | 15.2 | 9.4 | PR-800 – Palmarito | |
| Corozal | Palmarito | 15.2– 15.3 | 9.4– 9.5 | Puente del Riachuelo over the Quebrada Riachuelo | |
| Corozal | Palmarito | 15.8 | 9.8 | PR-801 – Naranjito, Palmarito, Maná | |
| Corozal | Negros | 22.2 | 13.8 | PR-805 – Naranjito, Negros, Palos Blancos | |
| Corozal | Padilla | 25.0 | 15.5 | PR-618 – Morovis, Cuchillas | |
| Corozal | Padilla | 28.6– 28.7 | 17.8– 17.8 | PR-5568 – Morovis, Vega Alta | |
| Corozal | Padilla–Cibuco line | 30.1 | 18.7 | PR-159 – Morovis, Corozal, Toa Alta | Northern terminus of PR-568 |
1.000 mi = 1.609 km; 1.000 km = 0.621 mi

== Related route ==
Highway 5568
- Location: Corozal
- Length: 4.4 km (2.7 mi)

Puerto Rico Highway 5568 (PR-5568) is a spur route located in Padilla, a barrio of the municipality of Corozal. With a length of 4.4 km (2.7 mi), it begins at PR-568 and ends at its junction with PR-159 and PR-647 near Unibón and Cienegueta barrios. PR-5568 is a rural road with one lane in each direction along its entire length and serves as access to several neighborhood in western Padilla. The entire route is located in Corozal.

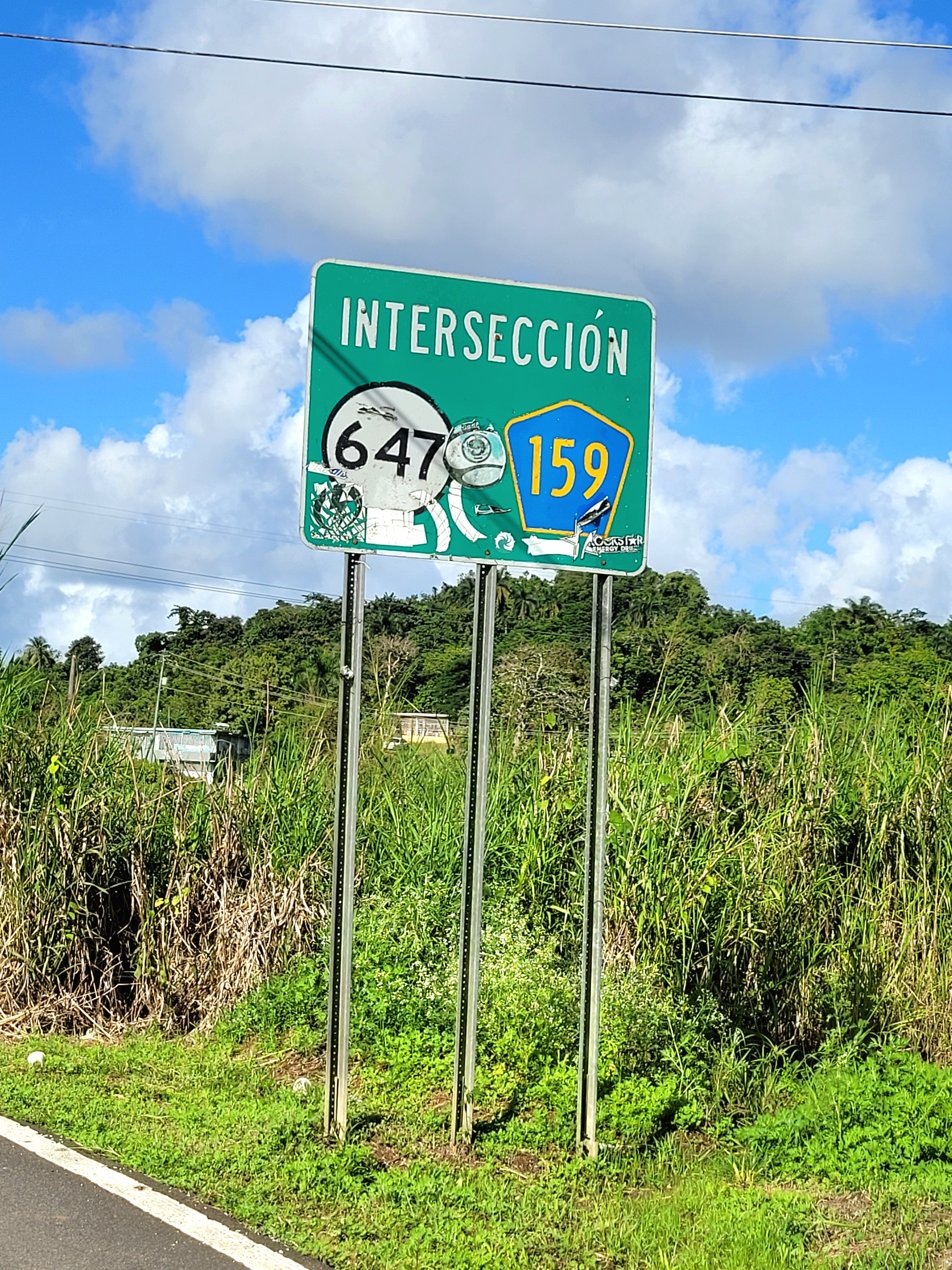
PR-5568 north approaching PR-159 and PR-647 junction in Padilla, Corozal

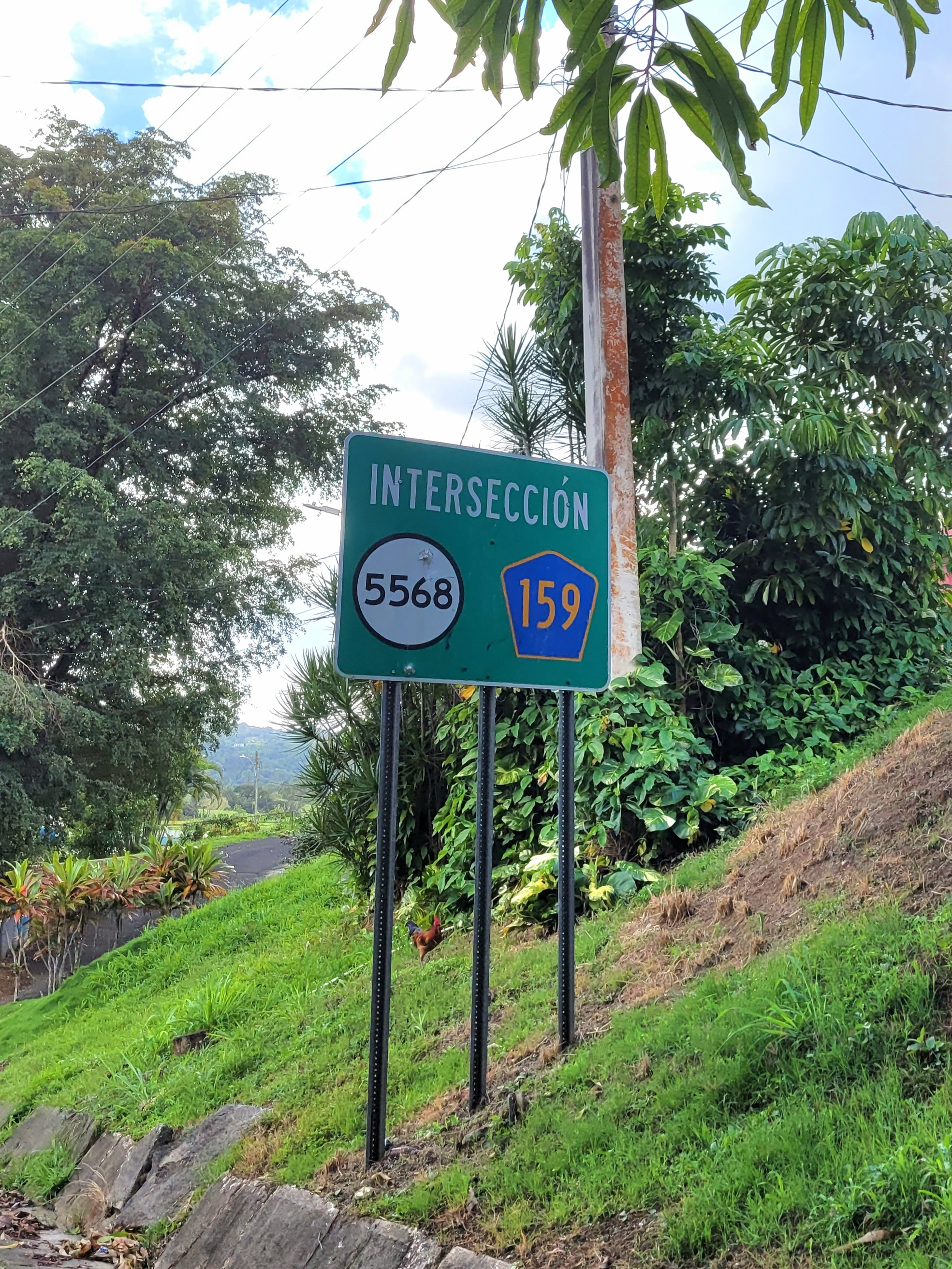
PR-647 south approaching PR-159 and PR-5568 junction in Cienegueta, Vega Alta

| Location | km | mi | Destinations | Notes |
|---|---|---|---|---|
| Padilla | 0.0 | 0.0 | PR-568 – Corozal, Orocovis | Southern terminus of PR-5568 |
| Padilla–Cibuco line | 4.4 | 2.7 | PR-159 – Corozal, Toa Alta, Morovis | Northern terminus of PR-5568 |
| Padilla–Cibuco line | 4.4 | 2.7 | PR-647 – Vega Alta | Continuation beyond PR-159 |
1.000 mi = 1.609 km; 1.000 km = 0.621 mi
