= Cuchillas, Corozal, Puerto Rico =

Barrio of Puerto Rico

Cuchillas
- Barrio
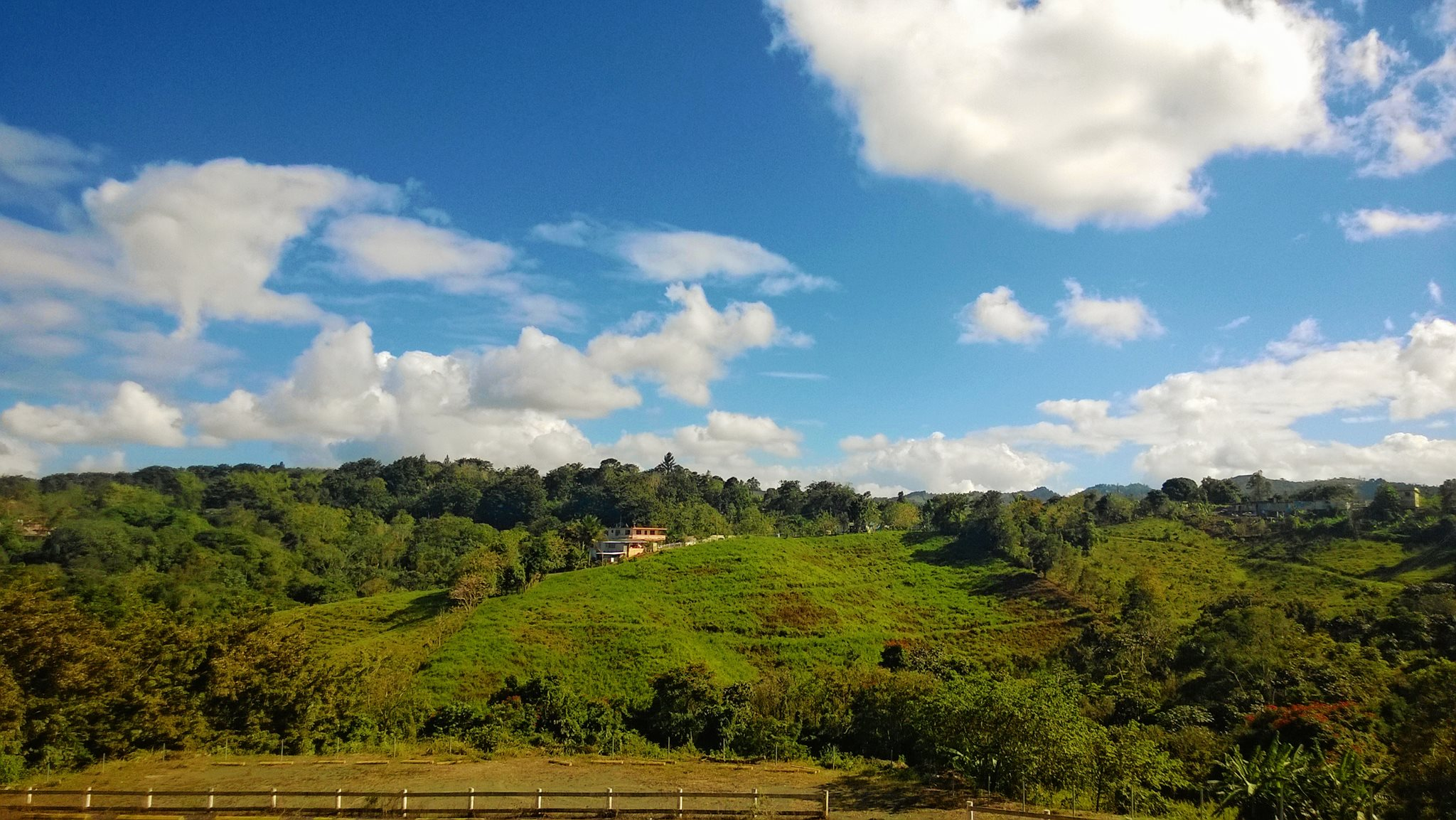
- A home in the hills of Cuchillas

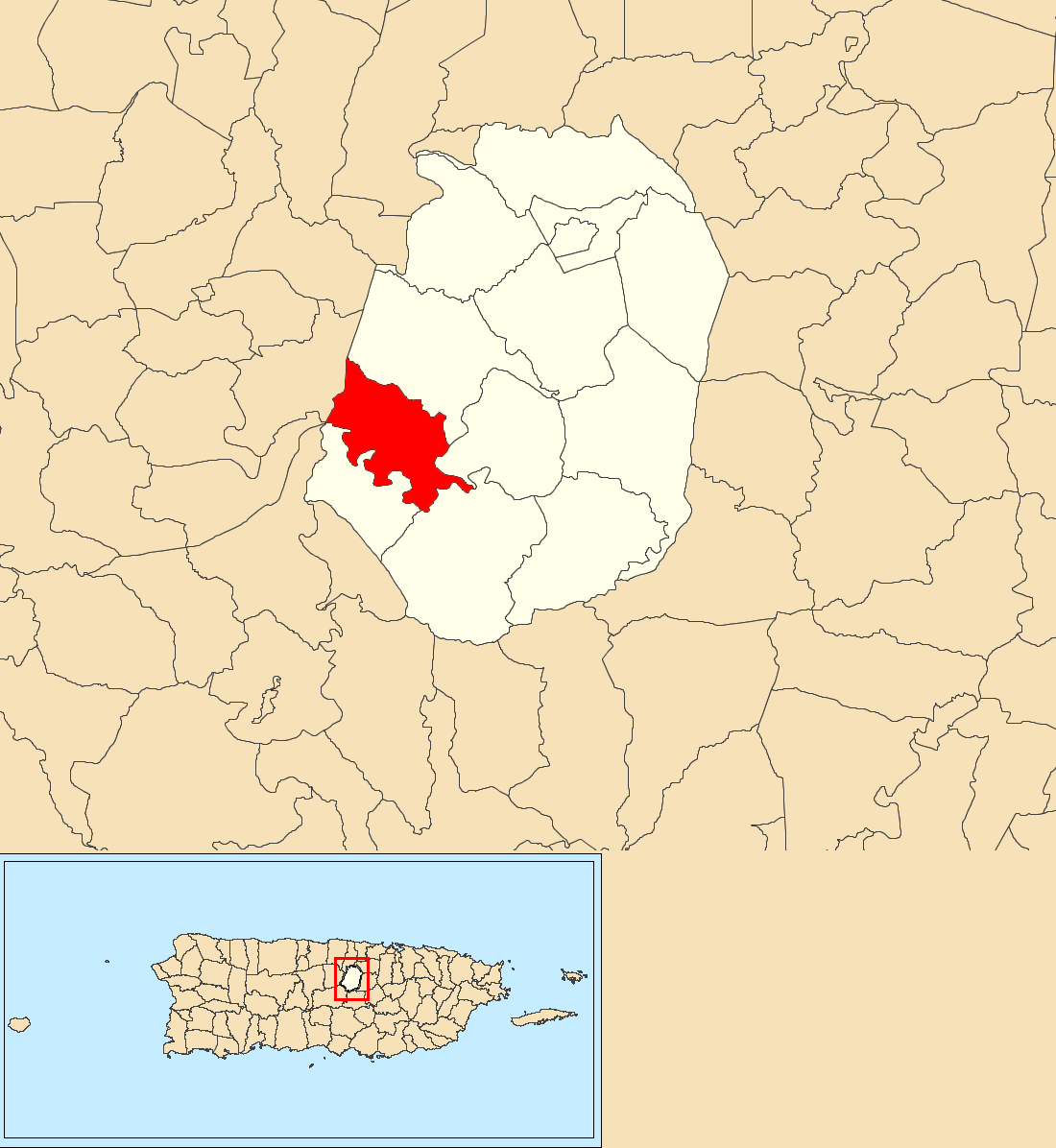
- Location of Cuchillas within the municipality of Corozal shown in red

- Location of Puerto Rico
- Coordinates: 18°17′40″N 66°21′47″W
- Commonwealth: Puerto Rico
- Municipality: Corozal

Area
  - Total: 2.69 sq mi (7.0 km^{2})
  - Land: 2.69 sq mi (7.0 km^{2})
  - Water: 0 sq mi (0 km^{2})
- Elevation: 1,549 ft (472 m)

Population (2010)
  - Total: 1,551
  - Density: 576.6/sq mi (222.6/km^{2})
- Source: 2010 Census
- Time zone: UTC−4 (AST)

Cuchillas is a rural barrio in the municipality of Corozal, Puerto Rico. Its population in 2010 was 1,551.

== History ==
Cuchillas was in Spain's gazetteers until Puerto Rico was ceded by Spain in the aftermath of the Spanish–American War under the terms of the Treaty of Paris of 1898 and became an unincorporated territory of the United States. In 1899, the United States Department of War conducted a census of Puerto Rico finding that the population of Cuchillas barrio was 585.

== Boundaries ==
Cuchillas is located in the northwestern section of Corozal. Cuchillas shares a border with Padilla, Negros, Palmarito and Magueyes, all barrios of Corozal as well as with Cuchillas in Morovis municipality. The Río Grande de Manatí runs along the southern border of Cuchillas, between Cuchillas and Magueyes and intersects with the Orocovis River.

== Features and demographics ==
Cuchillas has 2.69 square miles (7.0 km^{2}) of land area and no water area. In 2010, its population was 1,551 with a population density of 576.6 inhabitants per square mile (222.6/km^{2}).

Historical population
Census	Pop.	Note	%±
1900	585		—
1910	752		28.5%
1920	700		−6.9%
1930	971		38.7%
1940	1,139		17.3%
1950	1,300		14.1%
1960	1,432		10.2%
1970	1,195		−16.6%
1980	1,167		−2.3%
1990	1,213		3.9%
2000	1,393		14.8%
2010	1,551		11.3%
U.S. Decennial Census; 1899 (shown as 1900) 1910-1930; 1930-1950 1980-2000 2010

== Sectors ==
Barrios (which are now like minor civil divisions) in turn are further subdivided into smaller local populated place areas/units called sectores (sectors in English). The types of sectores may vary, from normally sector to urbanización to reparto to barriada to residencial, among others.

The following sectors are in Cuchillas barrio:

Sector Berio, Sector Car Wash, Sector Collazo, Sector Guayabo, Sector Hormigas II, Sector La Pajona, Sector Los Cocos, Sector Los Indios, Sector Los Rosado, Sector Millo Santiago, Sector Siquín Morales, Sector Tivo Vázquez, and Sector Toñito Santiago.

== See also ==
- List of communities in Puerto Rico
- List of barrios and sectors of Corozal, Puerto Rico
