= Puerto Rico Highway 807 =

Highway in Puerto Rico

Highway 807
- Ruta 807

Route information
- Maintained by Puerto Rico DTPW
- Length: 6.9 km (4.3 mi)

Major junctions
- South end: PR-805 in Palos Blancos–Negros
- North end: Calle San Manuel in Corozal barrio-pueblo

Location
- Country: United States
- Territory: Puerto Rico
- Municipalities: Corozal

Highway system
- Roads in Puerto Rico; List
← PR-806	→ PR-810

Puerto Rico Highway 807 (PR-807) is a north–south road located in the municipality of Corozal in Puerto Rico. With a length of 6.9 km (4.3 mi), it begins at Calle San Manuel in downtown Corozal, passing through Dos Bocas barrio until its southern terminus at its junction with PR-805 on the Palos Blancos–Negros line.

== Route description ==
This highway consists of one lane in each direction along its entire length. In downtown Corozal, PR-807 heads to the south near PR-891 and serves to several neighborhoods before entering Dos Bocas barrio. On its way to the south, it crosses the Río de los Negros, a tributary of the Río Cibuco basin. Between Pueblo and Dos Bocas barrios, PR-807 becomes rural as it climbs the Corozal mountains until its southern end, meeting several neighborhoods and sectors on its way. In Palos Blancos, PR-807 reaches its highest point upon reaching its southern terminus at PR-805 junction.

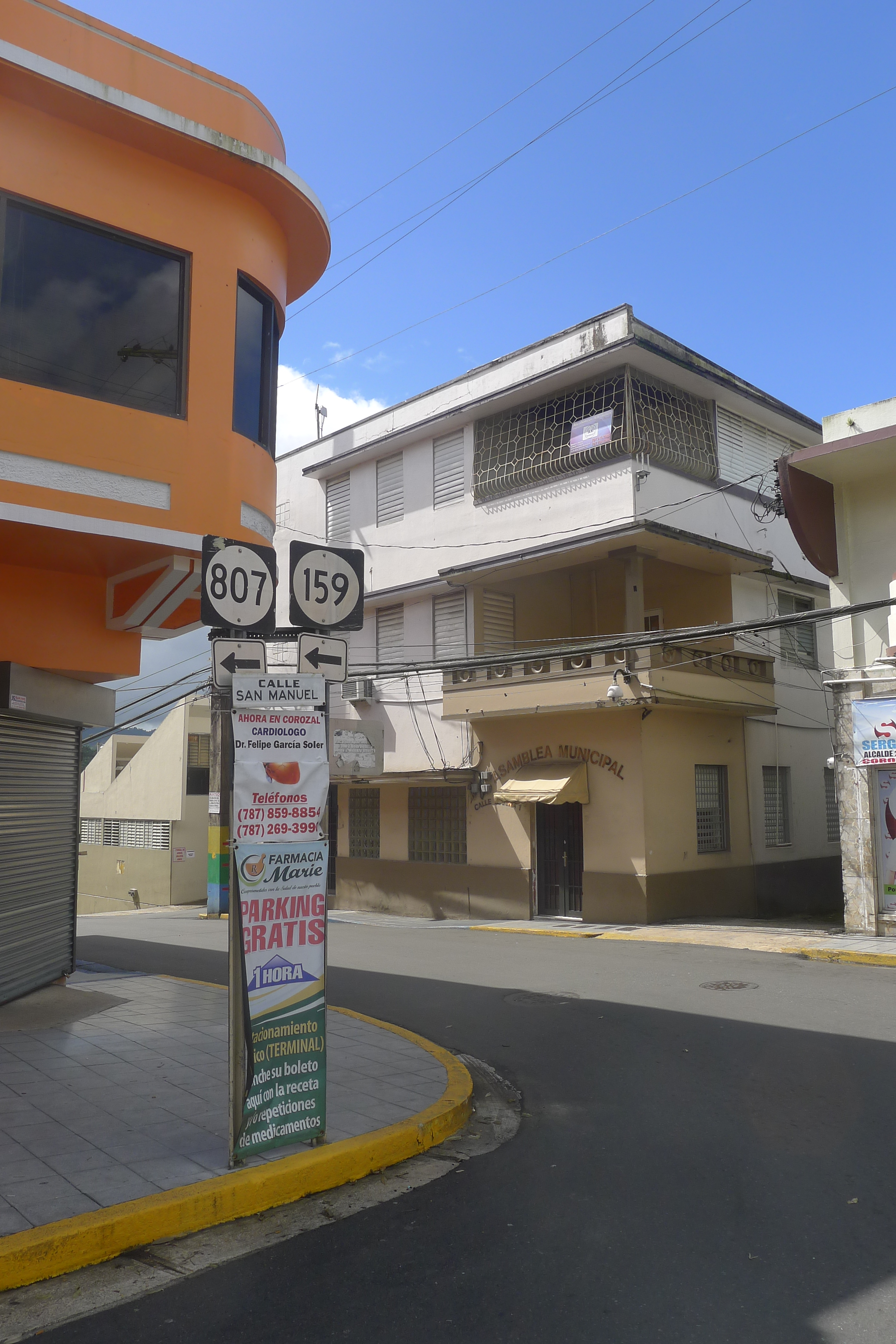
Signs for PR-159 and PR-807 in Corozal barrio-pueblo

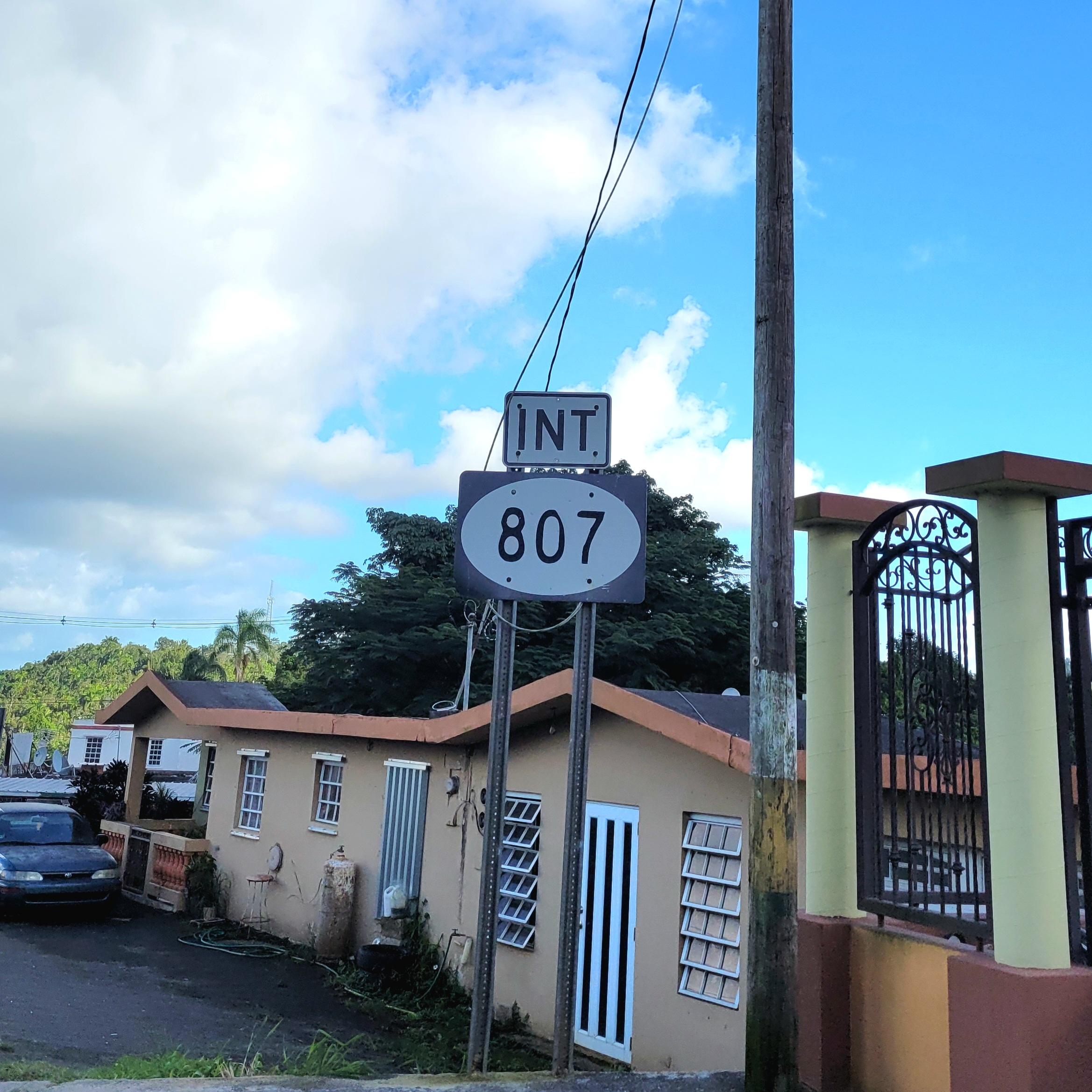
PR-805 east near PR-807 intersection in Negros barrio

== History ==
Prior to its numerical designation, PR-807 was only known as Camino del Banco. The current numerical designation corresponds to the 1953 Puerto Rico highway renumbering, a process implemented by the Puerto Rico Department of Transportation and Public Works (Spanish: Departamento de Transportación y Obras Públicas) that increased the insular highway network to connect existing routes with different locations around Puerto Rico.

== Major intersections ==
The entire route is located in Corozal.

Location	km	mi	Destinations	Notes
Palos Blancos–Negros line	6.9	4.3	PR-805 – Negros, Cedro Arriba	Southern terminus of PR-807
Corozal barrio-pueblo	0.0	0.0	PR-Calle San Manuel – Pueblo	Northern terminus of PR-807
1.000 mi = 1.609 km; 1.000 km = 0.621 mi
