= Magueyes, Corozal, Puerto Rico =

Barrio of Puerto Rico

Magueyes
- Barrio
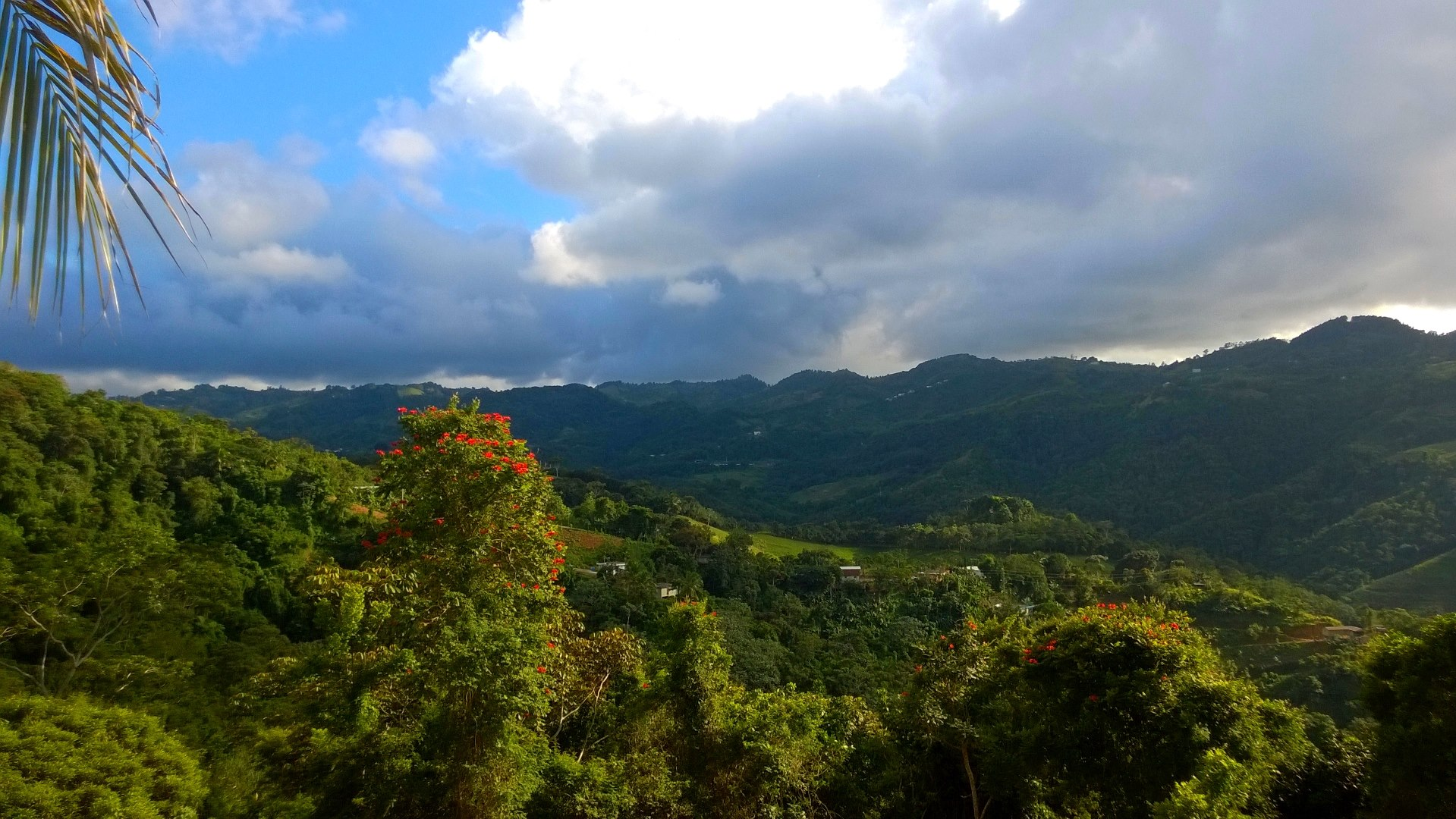
- A view of Magueyes from Cuchillas in Corozal

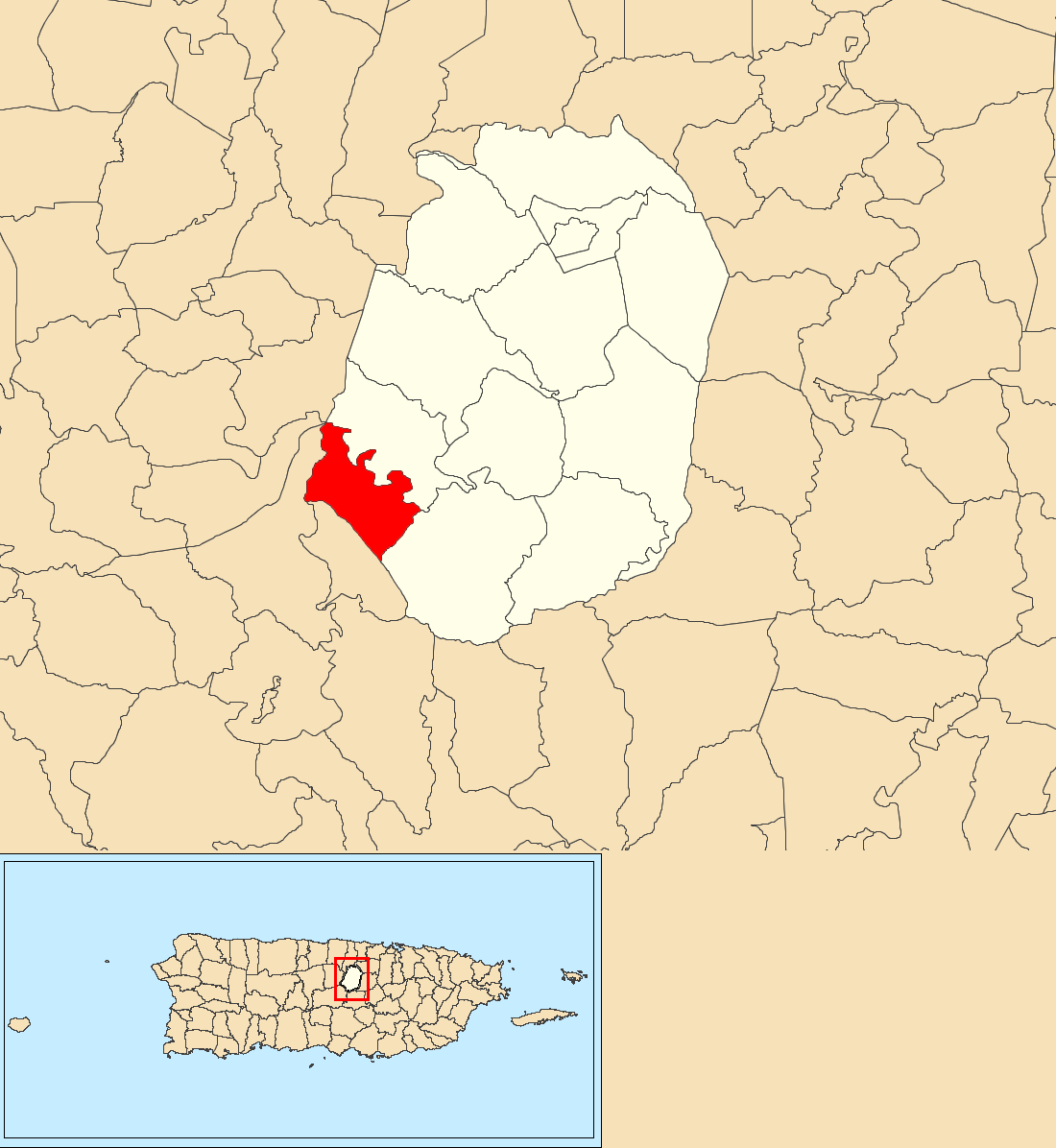
- Location of Magueyes within the municipality of Corozal shown in red

- Location of Puerto Rico
- Coordinates: 18°16′34″N 66°22′09″W
- Commonwealth: Puerto Rico
- Municipality: Corozal

Area
  - Total: 1.97 sq mi (5.1 km^{2})
  - Land: 1.97 sq mi (5.1 km^{2})
  - Water: 0 sq mi (0 km^{2})
- Elevation: 1,499 ft (457 m)

Population (2010)
  - Total: 363
  - Density: 184.3/sq mi (71.2/km^{2})
- Source: 2010 Census
- Time zone: UTC−4 (AST)

Magueyes is a rural barrio in the municipality of Corozal, Puerto Rico. Its population in 2010 was 363.

== History ==
Magueyes was in Spain's gazetteers until Puerto Rico was ceded by Spain in the aftermath of the Spanish–American War under the terms of the Treaty of Paris of 1898 and became an unincorporated territory of the United States. In 1899, the United States Department of War conducted a census of Puerto Rico finding that the population of Magueyes barrio was 849.

== Features and demographics ==
Magueyes has 1.97 square miles (5.1 km^{2}) of land area and no water area. In 2010, its population was 363 with a population density of 184.3 inhabitants per square mile (71.2/km^{2}).

Historical population
Census	Pop.	Note	%±
1900	849		—
1910	503		−40.8%
1920	725		44.1%
1930	580		−20.0%
1940	651		12.2%
1950	735		12.9%
1960	498		−32.2%
1970	312		−37.3%
1980	266		−14.7%
1990	263		−1.1%
2000	295		12.2%
2010	363		23.1%
U.S. Decennial Census; 1899 (shown as 1900) 1910-1930; 1930-1950 1980-2000 2010

PR-568 is the main north-south road through Magueyes.

== Sectors ==
Barrios (which are, in contemporary times, roughly comparable to minor civil divisions) in turn are further subdivided into smaller local populated place areas/units called sectores (sectors in English). The types of sectores may vary, from normally sector to urbanización to reparto to barriada to residencial, among others.

The following sectors are in Magueyes barrio:

Sector Capilla, Sector Escuela, Sector Grego Meléndez, Sector Lechería, Sector Los Carros, and Sector Los González.

== See also ==
- List of communities in Puerto Rico
- List of barrios and sectors of Corozal, Puerto Rico
