= List of barrios and sectors of Corozal, Puerto Rico =

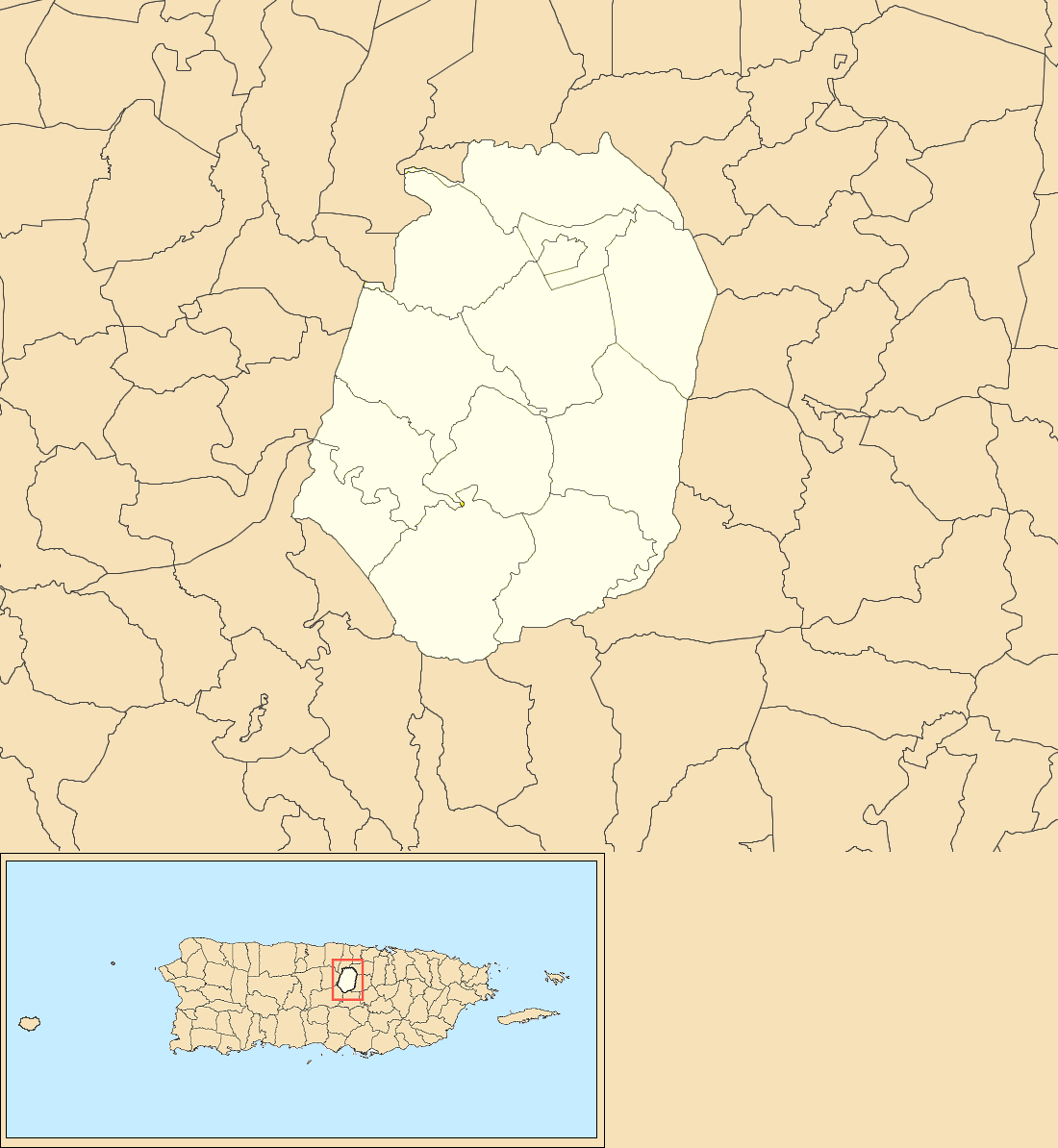
Corozal map with barrio subdivisions

Like all municipalities of Puerto Rico, Corozal is subdivided into administrative units called barrios, which are, in contemporary times, roughly comparable to minor civil divisions. The barrios in turn, are further subdivided into smaller local populated place areas/units called sectores (sectors in English). The types of sectores may vary, from normally sector to urbanización to reparto to barriada to residencial, among others. Some sectors appear in two barrios.

== List of sectors by barrio ==
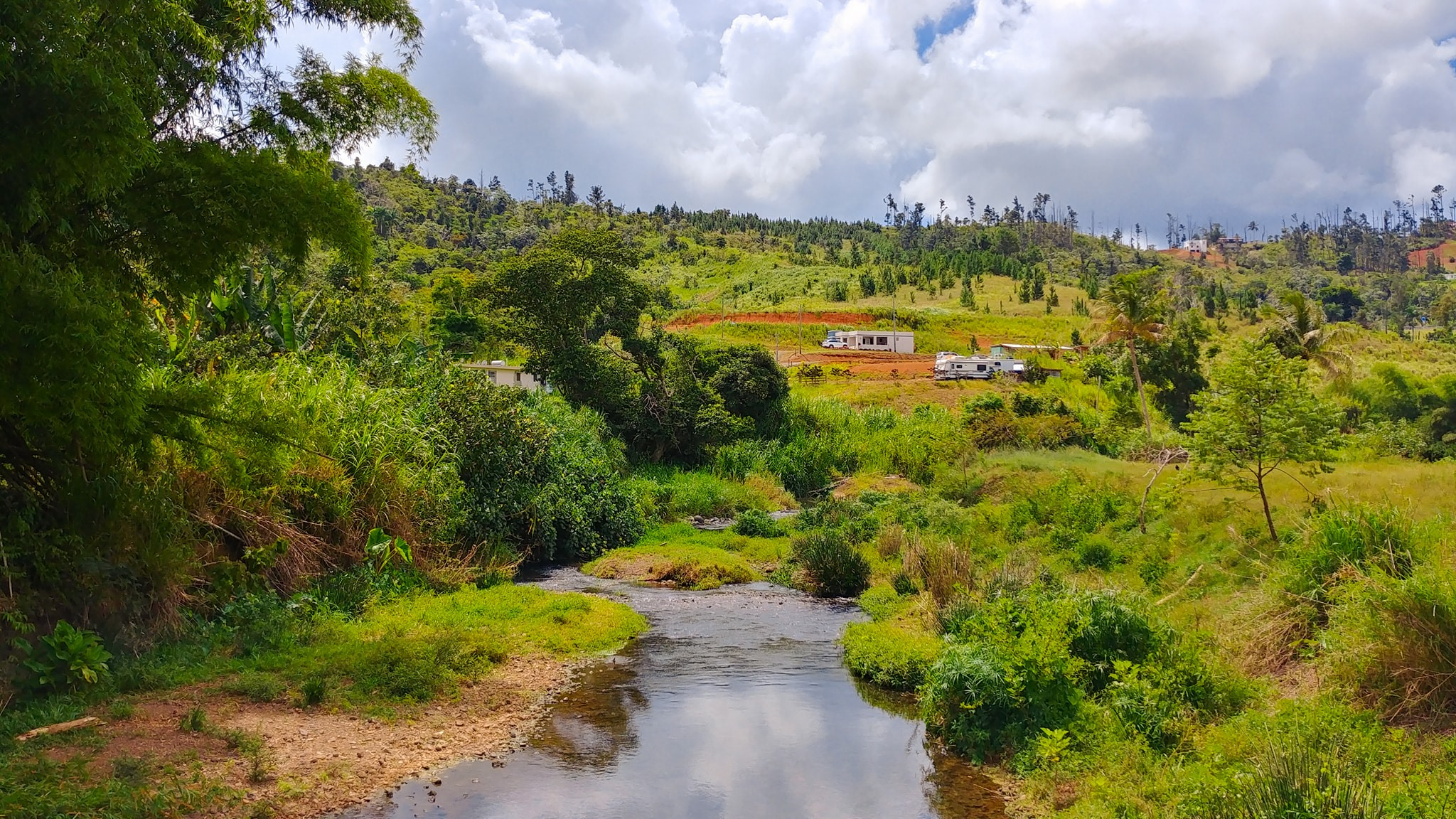
Sector La Vega in Maná

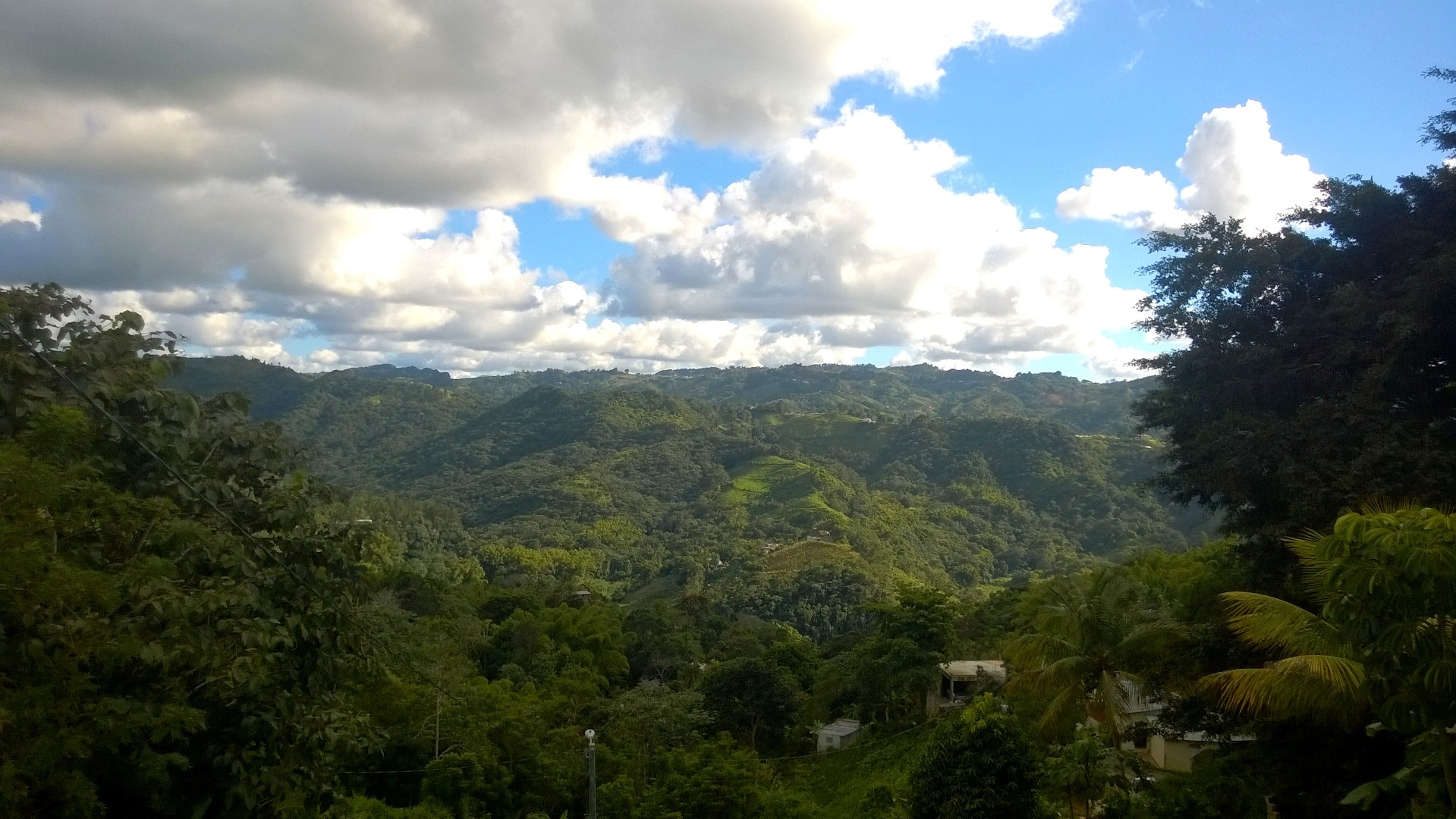
Sector Lorencito Frau in Negros

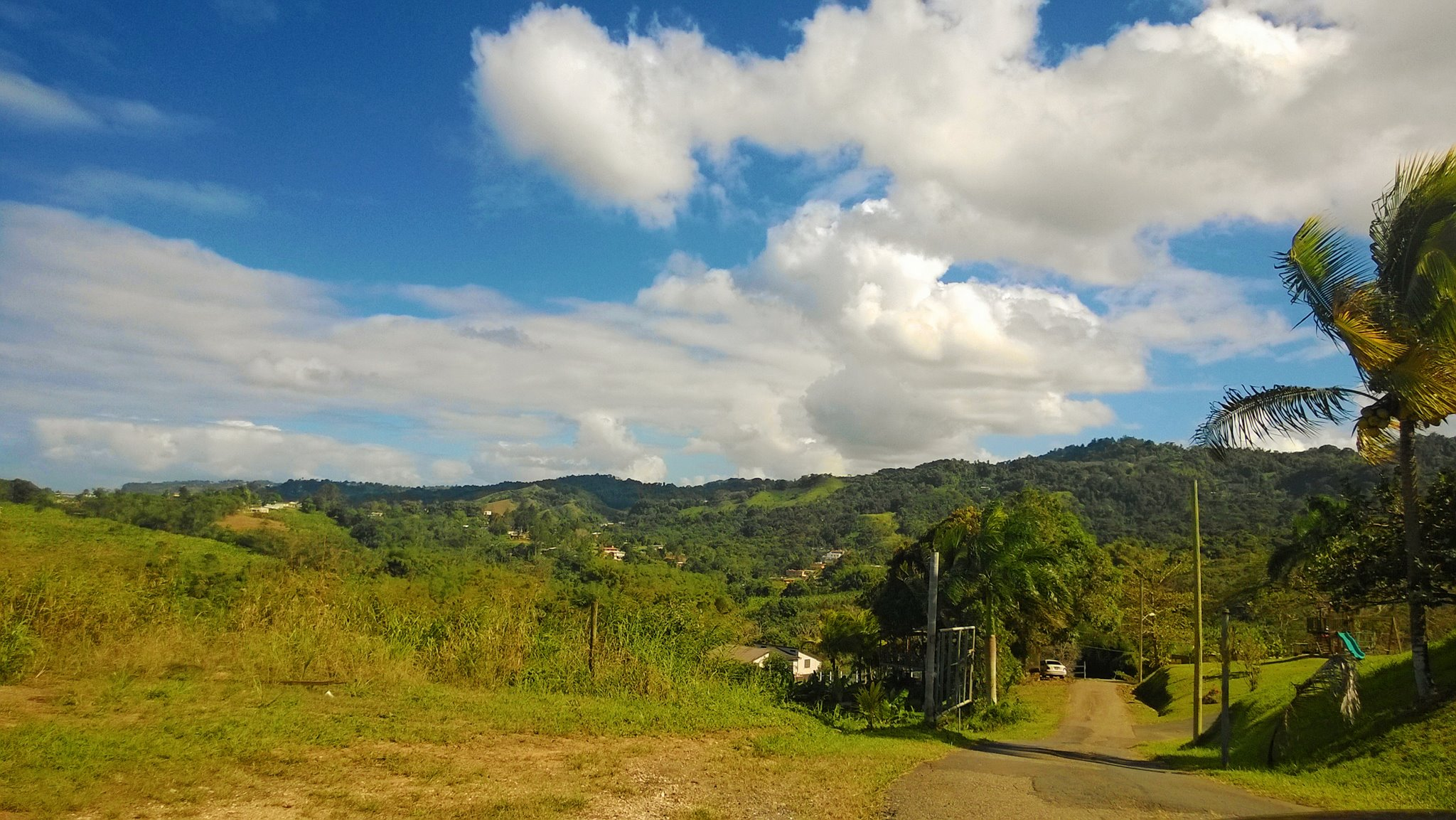
Sector Los Rodríguez in Padilla

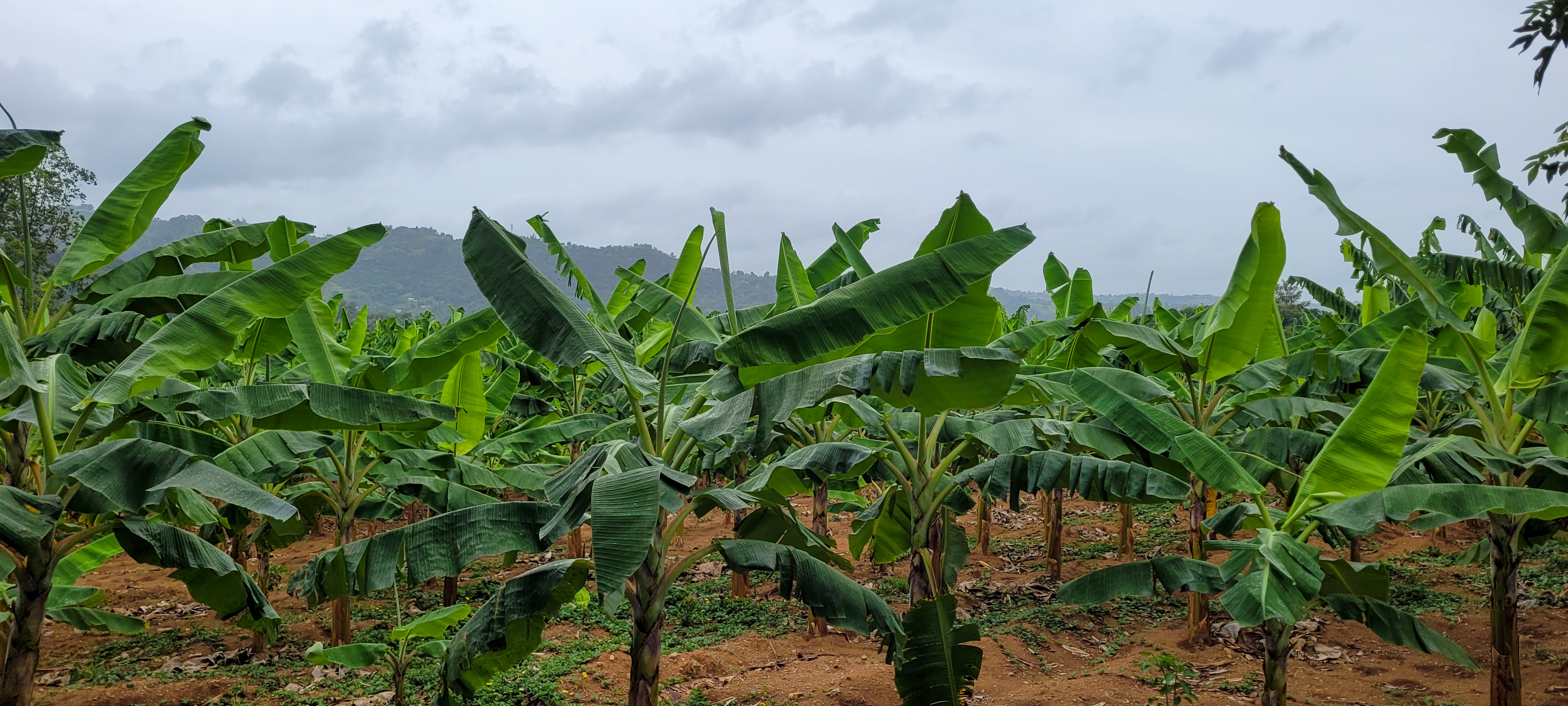
Sector Los Llanos in Palmarejo

=== Abras ===
Although Abras officially consists of only one single barrio, it is traditionally subdivided into three areas or sub-barrios:

==== Abras ====
- Sector Cueva de Paca
- Sector El Brillante
- Sector Hoya Ranch
- Sector La Alcoba
- Sector La Calabaza
- Sector La Pollera
- Sector Los Ramos
- Sector Los Torres
- Sector Marcelo Rosado
- Sector Parcelas
- Sector Víctor Pantojas
- Urbanización Vista del Río I
- Urbanización Vista del Río II
- Urbanización Vista del Río III

==== Abras Centro ====
- Sector Carretera (from La Capilla to Sector Sandoval)
- Sector Chago Adorno
- Sector Charol
- Sector El Convento
- Sector La Capilla
- Sector La Escuelita
- Sector Lorenzo Agosto
- Sector Los Bruno
- Sector Sandoval

==== Abras Mavilla ====
- Sector Adolfa
- Sector Balalaika
- Sector El Batey
- Sector Los Bruno
- Sector Los Mudos
- Sector Los Rolones
- Sector Los Rosado
- Sector Los Torres
- Urbanización Jardines de Mavilla
- Urbanización Las Brisas
- Urbanización Quintas de Plaza Aquarium
- Urbanización San Rafael

=== Cibuco ===
Although Cibuco officially consists of only one single barrio, it is traditionally subdivided into three areas or sub-barrios:

==== Cibuco 1 ====
- Sector Academia
- Sector Aníbal Cabranes
- Sector Baja del Palo
- Sector Boina
- Sector Geño Trinidad
- Sector La Escuela
- Sector Los Crespo
- Sector Los Puertos
- Sector Los Torres
- Sector Los Trinidad
- Sector Maguayo
- Sector Mingo Negrón
- Sector Nela Nevárez
- Sector Tomás Colón
- Urbanización Estancias de Cibuco
- Urbanización Los Próceres
- Urbanización Villas de Cibuco

==== Cibuco 2 ====
- Extensión Sylvia
- Sector Acueducto
- Sector Empalme
- Sector Guevara
- Sector Julio Ortega
- Sector Korea
- Sector La Mina
- Sector Layo Rosado
- Sector Los Mangoes
- Sector Los Pacheco
- Sector Millo Maldonado
- Sector Monte de las Brujas
- Sector Pepe Pizza
- Sector Rolo Barrera
- Urbanización Alturas de Cibuco
- Urbanización Cibuco
- Urbanización Colinas de Corozal
- Urbanización Sylvia

==== Cibuco 3 ====
- Sector El Vironay
- Sector Juan Vázquez
- Sector Lin Pérez
- Urbanización Valle de Aramaná
- Urbanización Villas de Monte Verde

=== Corozal barrio-pueblo ===
- Barriada Aldea Vázquez
- Barriada Bou
- Calle Carmelo Aponte
- Calle Cervantes
- Calle Colegio Católico
- Calle Culto
- Calle Gándara
- Calle Genaro Bou
- Calle Howard T. Jason
- Calle José Valiente
- Calle La Marina
- Calle Las Mercedes
- Calle Nueva
- Calle San Manuel
- Calle Urbano Ramírez
- Calle Santo Domingo
- Calle Sostre
- Calle San Ramón
- Desvío Urbano
- Extensión Sobrino
- Residencial El Centro
- Residencial Enrique Landrón
- Sector Alcantarilla
- Sector Alfonso Matos
- Sector Cantera
- Sector Portugués
- Urbanización Sanfeliz
- Urbanización Sobrino

=== Cuchillas ===
- Sector Berio
- Sector Car Wash
- Sector Collazo
- Sector Guayabo
- Sector Hormigas II
- Sector La Pajona
- Sector Los Cocos
- Sector Los Indios
- Sector Los Rosado
- Sector Millo Santiago
- Sector Siquín Morales
- Sector Tivo Vázquez
- Sector Toñito Santiago

=== Dos Bocas ===
- Calle Leoncito Ortiz
- Parcelas Ortiz
- Sector Ángel Vázquez
- Sector Benjamín González
- Sector Bernardo Padilla
- Sector Caldero
- Sector Carmelo Ortiz (Los Batatos)
- Sector Carretera (from Dos Bocas entrance to Sector Mingo Díaz)
- Sector Daniel Negrón
- Sector El Faro
- Sector El Quinto
- Sector El Típico
- Sector Honduras
- Sector Julio Vázquez
- Sector La Mina
- Sector La Santa
- Sector Leoncito Ortíz
- Sector Los García
- Sector Los Maldonado
- Sector Los Marrero
- Sector Los Miranda
- Sector Mingo Díaz
- Sector Moncho Santos
- Sector Neco Chévere
- Sector Sioso Virella
- Urbanización Loma Linda
- Urbanización San Francisco

=== Magueyes ===
- Sector Capilla
- Sector Escuela
- Sector Grego Meléndez
- Sector Lechería
- Sector Los Carros
- Sector Los González

=== Maná ===
- Sector Andreu
- Sector Estancias de Maná
- Sector Ferdinand Santiago
- Sector La Escuela
- Sector La Vega
- Sector Los Berríos
- Sector Los Berros
- Sector Los Lozada
- Sector Los Pilones
- Sector Los Zayas
- Sector Manchuria
- Sector Monchito Pérez
- Sector Pocito Dulce
- Sector Quebrada Fría
- Sector Varo Mercado
- Sector William Alvarado

=== Negros ===
- Sector Acueducto
- Sector África
- Sector Carretera (from Amado Suárez to Iglesia Católica)
- Sector La Hacienda
- Sector La Planá
- Sector Lorencito Frau
- Sector Los Gatos
- Sector Los Pérez
- Sector Los Quiñones
- Sector Parcelas
- Sector Pepín García
- Urbanización Los Hermanos

=== Padilla ===
Although Padilla officially consists of only one single barrio, it is traditionally subdivided into two areas or sub-barrios:

==== Padilla ====
- Sector Campo Viejo
- Sector El Almendro
- Sector El Jíbaro
- Sector El Limón
- Sector Empalme
- Sector La Coroza
- Sector La Guinea
- Sector La Herradura
- Sector Layo Rivera
- Sector Los Baños
- Sector Los Llanos
- Sector Parcelas
- Sector Pepito Marrero
- Sector Virella
- Urbanización Alturas de Padilla
- Urbanización La Providencia

==== Padilla Ermita ====
- Sector Collores
- Sector Ermita
- Sector Experimental
- Sector Hormigas I
- Sector Los Caobos
- Sector Los Carrasco
- Sector Los Figueroa
- Sector Los Moreno
- Sector Los Rodríguez
- Sector Marungo
- Sector Navarro
- Sector Pablo Vázquez
- Sector Villarreal

=== Palmarejo ===
- Barriada Decene
- Calle Juana Santiago
- Parcelas Guarico
- Parcelas Julián Marrero
- Sector Alejo Rosado
- Sector Alturas de Corozal
- Sector Chary
- Sector Cheo Marrero
- Sector Club de Leones
- Sector Corozal Hills
- Sector Cuchillas
- Sector Dolores Cosme
- Sector El Convento
- Sector El Picuíto
- Sector El Pomito
- Sector El Rancho
- Sector Félix Padilla
- Sector Guarico
- Sector Juana Santiago
- Sector La Buruquena
- Sector La Gallera
- Sector La Mina
- Sector Los Fonseca
- Sector Los Llanos
- Sector Los Negrones
- Sector Los Nieves (from cemetery to La Gallera)
- Sector Los Panzardi
- Sector Los Rojas
- Sector Luis Collazo
- Sector Marrero
- Sector Pancho Febus
- Sector Pomo Rodríguez
- Sector Tom Rolón
- Sector Toño Patente
- Urbanización Estancias de Palmarejo
- Urbanización Los Policías
- Urbanización María del Carmen

=== Palmarito ===
Although Palmarito officially consists of only one single barrio, it is traditionally subdivided into two areas or sub-barrios:

==== Palmarito ====
- Parcelas Berio Nuevas
- Parcelas Berio Viejas
- Sector Albaladejo
- Sector Chago Torres
- Sector Che Díaz
- Sector Eduardo Rivera
- Sector El Riachuelo
- Sector Félix Padilla
- Sector Finito Santiago
- Sector Frank Ortiz
- Sector Geño Rivera
- Sector Los Molina
- Sector Pifio Rivera
- Sector Pimo Ortiz
- Urbanización Estancias de la Montaña

==== Palmarito Centro ====
- Sector El Cuatro
- Sector El Perico (La PRA)
- Sector Finín Lozada
- Sector La Gallera
- Sector Los Montesino
- Sector Los Peña
- Sector Marciano Burgos
- Sector Radio Oro (La Emisora)

=== Palos Blancos ===
- Parcelas Medina
- Sector Amado Suárez
- Sector Baldino Ortiz
- Sector Carretera (from Ángel Vázquez to Manuel Ortiz)
- Sector Colón
- Sector Demetrio Pacheco
- Sector El Cacique
- Sector El Pegao
- Sector El Siete (7)
- Sector Gobeo
- Sector Héctor Ortiz
- Sector La Arena
- Sector La Loma
- Sector La Perla
- Sector La Pollera
- Sector La Quinta
- Sector La Riviera
- Sector La Vega
- Sector Lino Caldero
- Sector Los Morales
- Sector Los Rodríguez
- Sector Los Bagué
- Sector Los Febus
- Sector Los Guzmanes
- Sector Los Morales (Emérito)
- Sector Los Padilla
- Sector Los Ramos
- Sector Los Ruiz
- Sector Los Velilla
- Sector Maná
- Sector Manuel Ortiz
- Sector Marcelino López
- Sector Nono Negrón
- Sector Pepe Córdova
- Sector Pepín Rodríguez
- Sector Quiliche
- Sector Rolo Pacheco
- Sector Pura Molina
- Sector Tato López
- Sector Varela
- Sector Virella

=== Pueblo ===
- Barriada Cuba Libre (Calle María Bou, Calle O’Neil, Calle Ramos, Calle Rivera)
- Calle Nieves
- Sector Georgies Pizza
- Sector Guayabal
- Sector Idilio
- Sector Kike Matos
- Sector La Alcoba
- Sector La Bodega
- Sector La Frigo
- Sector Lin Santos
- Sector Los Moreno
- Sector Los Torres
- Sector Mario Electricista
- Sector Maya Marzán
- Sector Paseo del Río
- Urbanización Cerromonte
- Urbanización Monterrey
- Urbanización Monte Verde

== See also ==
- List of communities in Puerto Rico
