= Dos Bocas, Corozal, Puerto Rico =

Barrio of Puerto Rico

Dos Bocas
- Barrio
- Río de los Negros in Dos Bocas

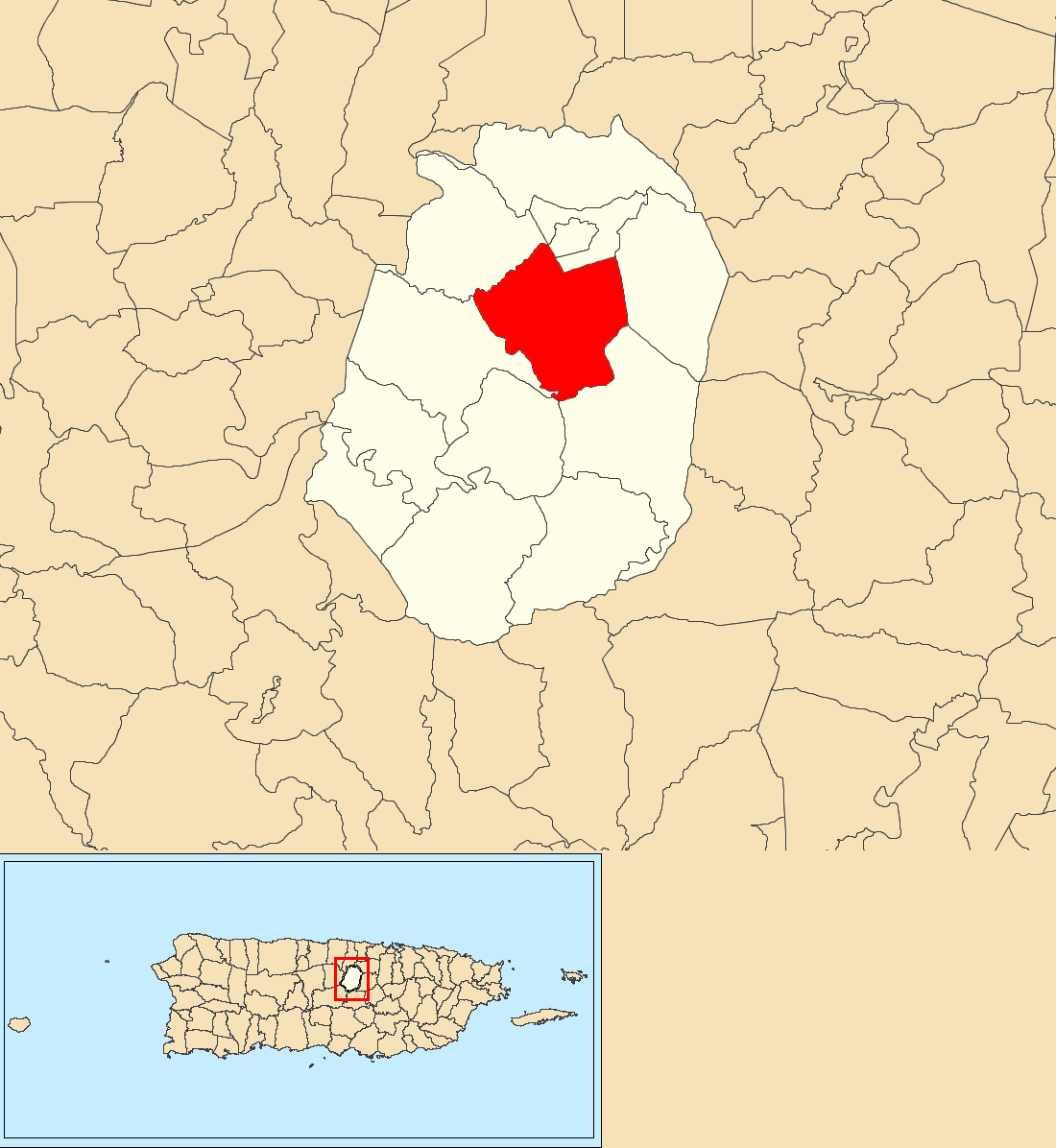
- Location of Dos Bocas within the municipality of Corozal shown in red

- Location of Puerto Rico
- Coordinates: 18°19′10″N 66°19′12″W
- Commonwealth: Puerto Rico
- Municipality: Corozal

Area
  - Total: 4.06 sq mi (10.5 km^{2})
  - Land: 4.06 sq mi (10.5 km^{2})
  - Water: 0 sq mi (0 km^{2})
- Elevation: 512 ft (156 m)

Population (2010)
  - Total: 3,060
  - Density: 753.7/sq mi (291.0/km^{2})
- Source: 2010 Census
- Time zone: UTC−4 (AST)

Dos Bocas is a rural barrio with an urban zone in the municipality of Corozal, Puerto Rico. Its population in 2010 was 3,060.

== History ==
Dos Bocas was in Spain's gazetteers until Puerto Rico was ceded by Spain in the aftermath of the Spanish–American War under the terms of the Treaty of Paris of 1898 and became an unincorporated territory of the United States. In 1899, the United States Department of War conducted a census of Puerto Rico finding that the population of Dos Bocas barrio was 909.

== Features and demographics ==
Dos Bocas has 4.06 square miles (10.5 km^{2}) of land area and no water area. In 2010, its population was 3,060 with a population density of 753.7 inhabitants per square mile (291.0/km^{2}).

Historical population
Census	Pop.	Note	%±
1900	909		—
1910	1,005		10.6%
1920	1,124		11.8%
1930	1,275		13.4%
1940	1,447		13.5%
1950	1,890		30.6%
1960	1,686		−10.8%
1970	0		−100.0%
1980	2,172		—
1990	2,640		21.5%
2000	2,760		4.5%
2010	3,060		10.9%
U.S. Decennial Census; 1899 (shown as 1900) 1910-1930; 1930-1950 1980-2000 2010

PR-807 is the main north-south road through Dos Bocas.

== Sectors ==
Barrios (which are like minor civil divisions) in turn are further subdivided into smaller local populated place areas/units called sectores (sectors in English). The types of sectores may vary, from normally sector to urbanización to reparto to barriada to residencial, among others.

The following sectors are in Dos Bocas barrio:

Calle Leoncito Ortiz, Parcelas Ortiz, Sector Ángel Vázquez, Sector Benjamín González, Sector Bernardo Padilla, Sector Caldero, Sector Carmelo Ortiz (Los Batatos), Sector Carretera (from Dos Bocas entrance to Sector Mingo Díaz), Sector Daniel Negrón, Sector El Faro, Sector El Quinto, Sector El Típico, Sector Honduras, Sector Julio Vázquez, Sector La Mina, Sector La Santa, Sector Leoncito Ortíz, Sector Los García, Sector Los Maldonado, Sector Los Marrero, Sector Los Miranda, Sector Mingo Díaz, Sector Moncho Santos, Sector Neco Chévere, Sector Sioso Virella, Urbanización Loma Linda, and Urbanización San Francisco.

== See also ==
- List of communities in Puerto Rico
- List of barrios and sectors of Corozal, Puerto Rico
