= Palmarito =

Barrio of Corozal, Puerto Rico

- Barrio
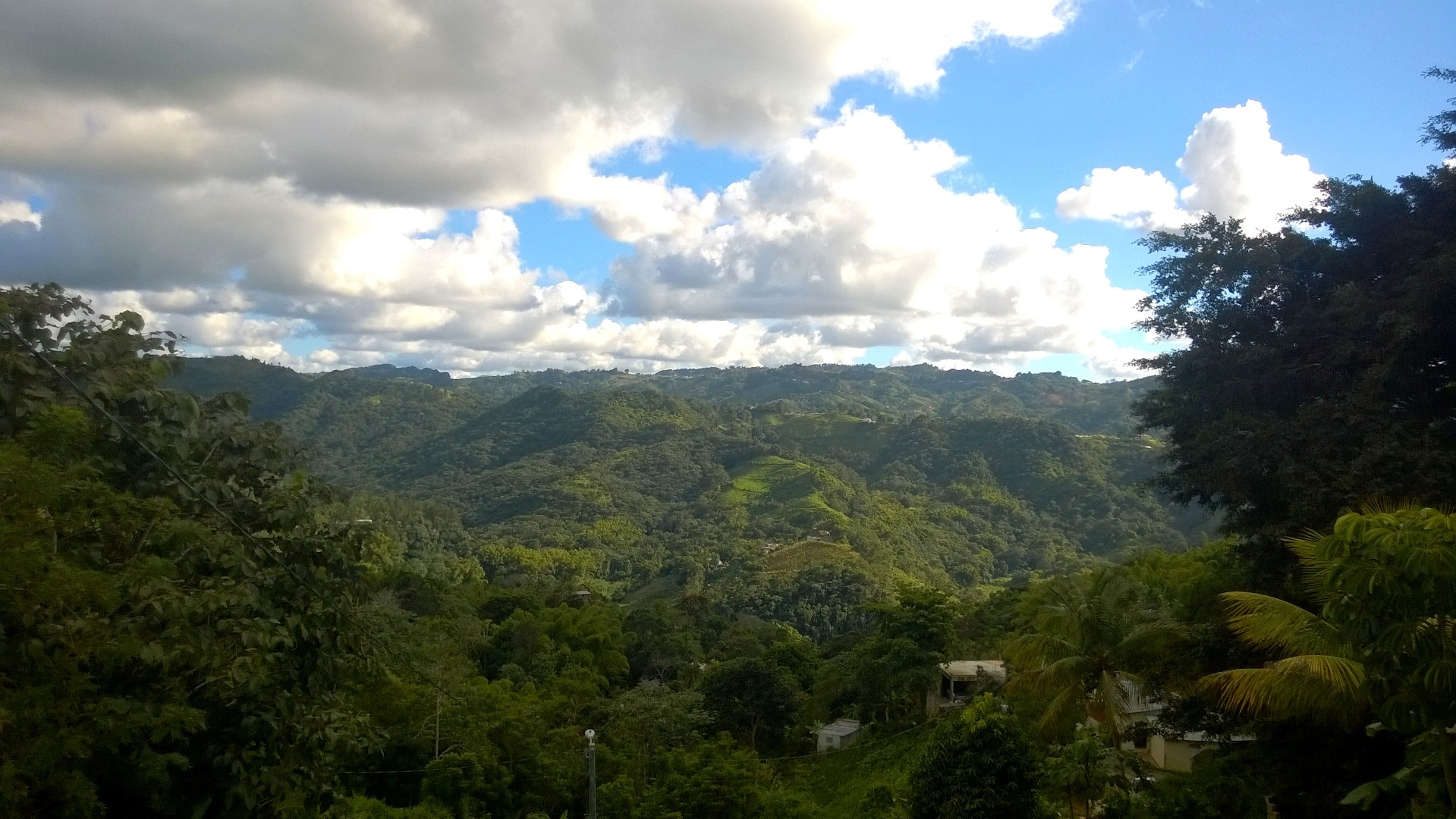
- A view of Palmarito from Negros in Corozal

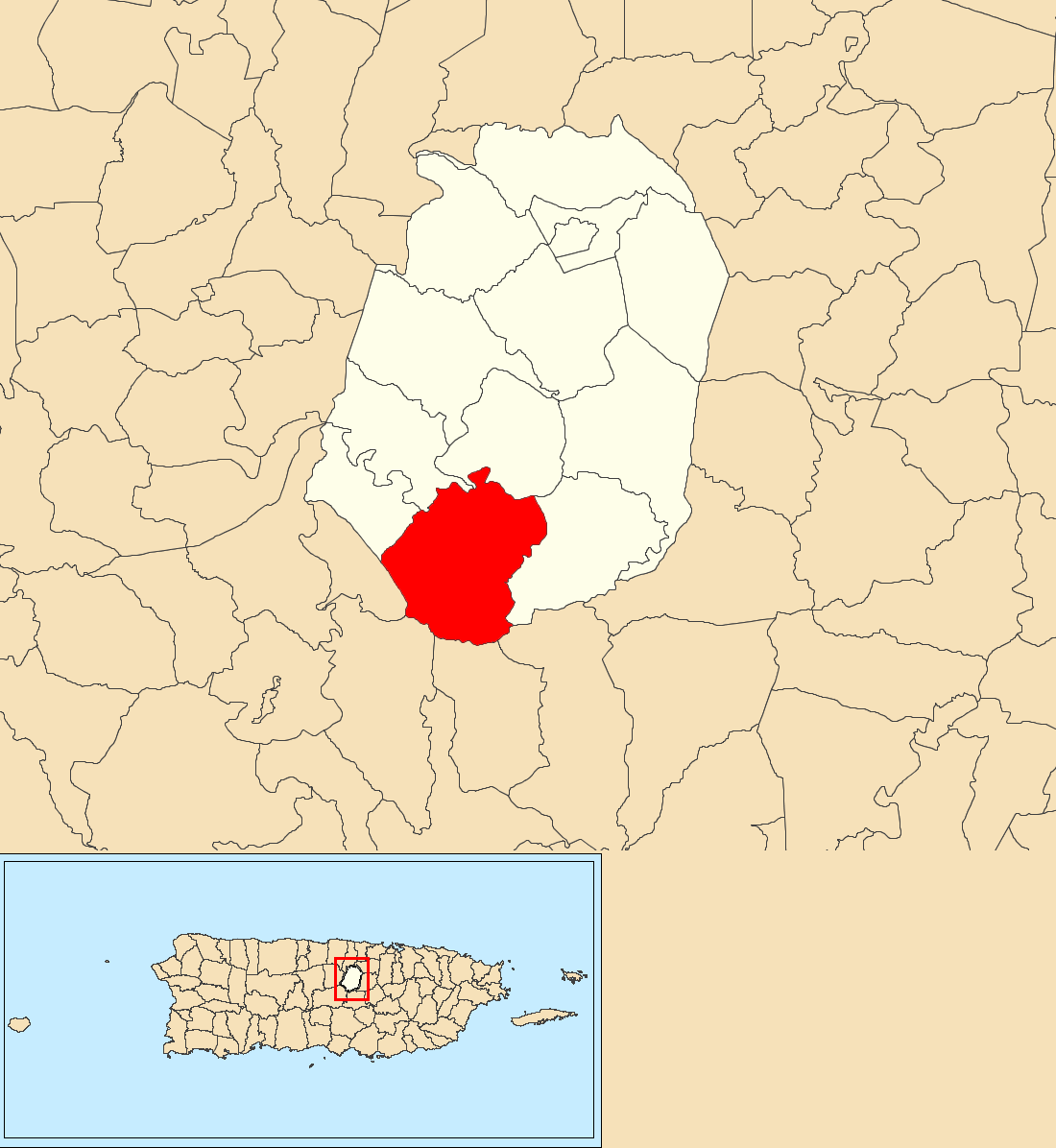
- Location of Palmarito within the municipality of Corozal shown in red

- Location of Puerto Rico
- Coordinates: 18°15′36″N 66°20′35″W
- Commonwealth: Puerto Rico
- Municipality: Corozal

Area
  - Total: 4.93 sq mi (12.8 km^{2})
  - Land: 4.93 sq mi (12.8 km^{2})
  - Water: 0 sq mi (0 km^{2})
- Elevation: 1,982 ft (604 m)

Population (2010)
  - Total: 2,227
  - Density: 451.7/sq mi (174.4/km^{2})
- Source: 2010 Census
- Time zone: UTC−4 (AST)

Palmarito is a rural barrio in the municipality of Corozal, Puerto Rico. Its population in 2010 was 2,227.

== History ==
Palmarito was in Spain's gazetteers until Puerto Rico was ceded by Spain in the aftermath of the Spanish–American War under the terms of the Treaty of Paris of 1898 and became an unincorporated territory of the United States. In 1899, the United States Department of War conducted a census of Puerto Rico finding that the population of Palmarito barrio was 770.

== Features and demographics ==
Palmarito has 4.93 square miles (12.8 km^{2}) of land area and no water area. In 2010, its population was 2,227 with a population density of 451.7 inhabitants per square mile (174.4/km^{2}).

Historical population
Census	Pop.	Note	%±
1900	770		—
1910	1,187		54.2%
1920	1,241		4.5%
1930	1,336		7.7%
1940	1,656		24.0%
1950	1,995		20.5%
1960	1,896		−5.0%
1970	1,960		3.4%
1980	1,944		−0.8%
1990	1,902		−2.2%
2000	2,160		13.6%
2010	2,227		3.1%
U.S. Decennial Census; 1899 (shown as 1900) 1910-1930; 1930-1950 1980-2000 2010

== Sectors ==
Barrios (which are, in contemporary times, roughly comparable to minor civil divisions) in turn are further subdivided into smaller local populated place areas/units called sectores (sectors in English). The types of sectores may vary, from normally sector to urbanización to reparto to barriada to residencial, among others.

The following sectors are in Palmarito barrio:

=== Palmarito ===
Parcelas Berio Nuevas, Parcelas Berio Viejas, Sector Albaladejo, Sector Chago Torres, Sector Che Díaz, Sector Eduardo Rivera, Sector El Riachuelo, Sector Félix Padilla, Sector Finito Santiago, Sector Frank Ortiz, Sector Geño Rivera, Sector Goyo Torres, Sector Los Molina, Sector Pifio Rivera, Sector Pimo Ortiz, and Urbanización Estancias de la Montaña.

=== Palmarito Centro ===
Sector El Cuatro, Sector El Perico (La PRA), Sector Finín Lozada, Sector La Gallera, Sector Los Montesino, Sector Los Peña, Sector Marciano Burgos, and Sector Radio Oro (La Emisora).

== Gallery ==
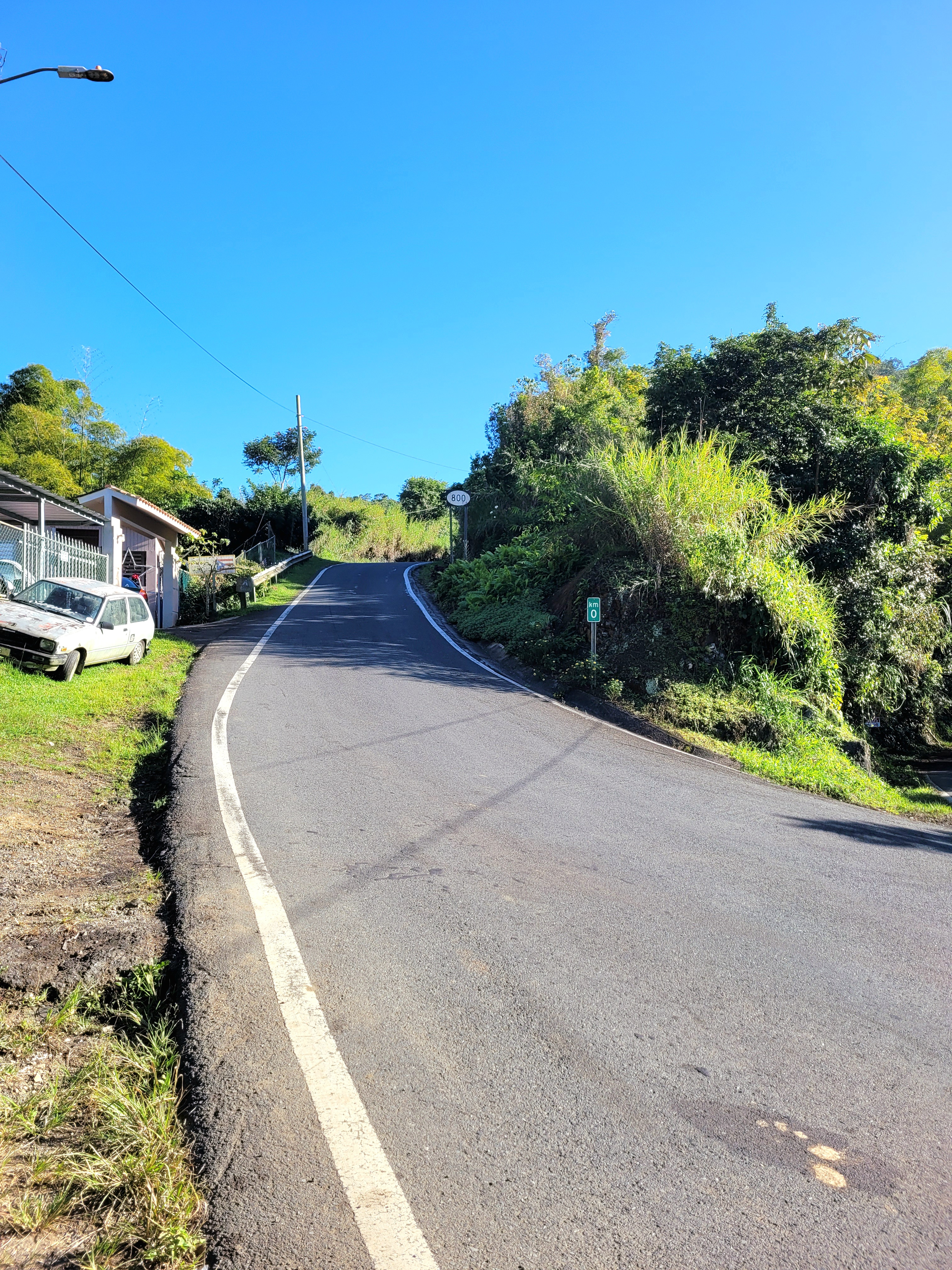
Puerto Rico Highway 800 in Palmarito

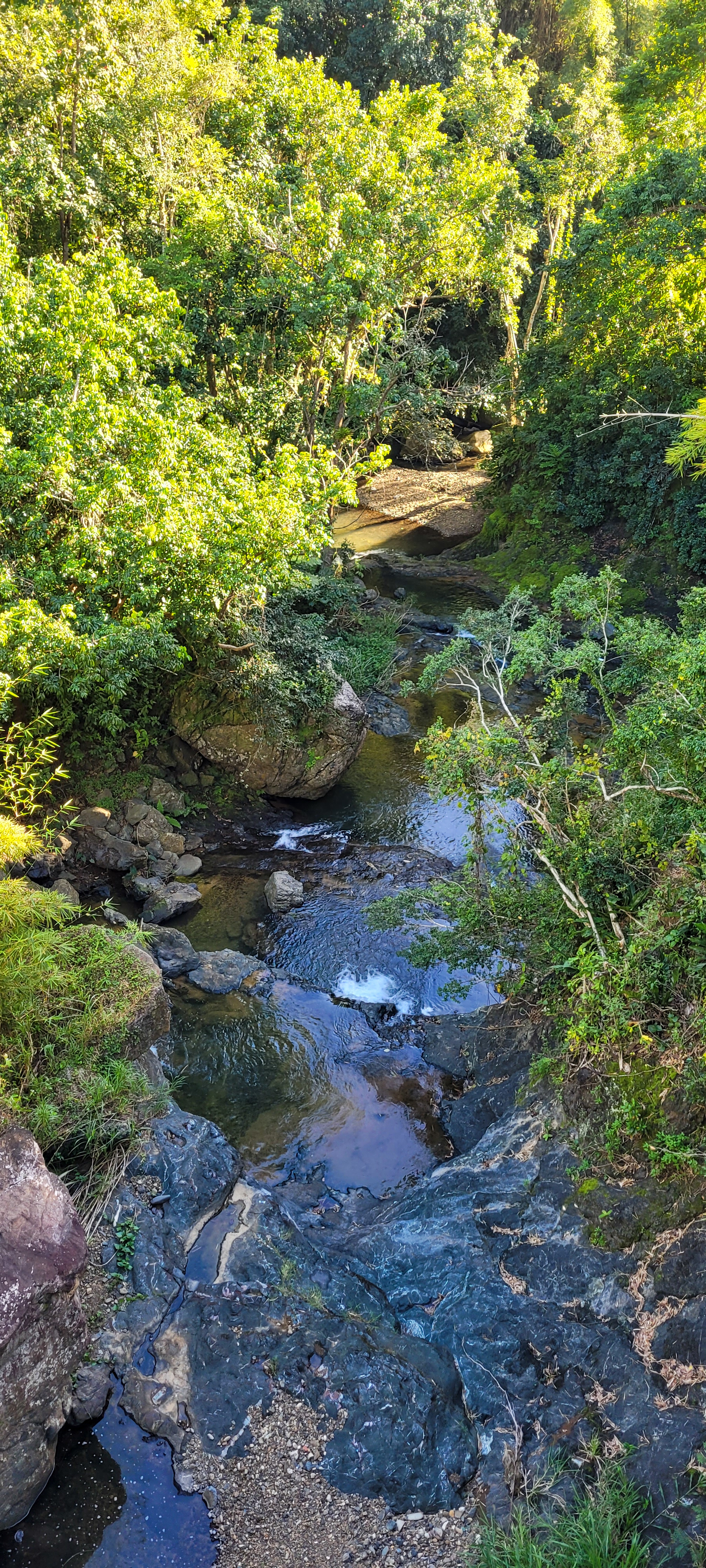
Quebrada Riachuelo in Palmarito

== See also ==
- List of communities in Puerto Rico
- List of barrios and sectors of Corozal, Puerto Rico
