= Río de los Negros =

River of Puerto Rico

- Río de los Negros in Dos Bocas barrio

Location
- Commonwealth: Puerto Rico
- Municipality: Corozal

Physical characteristics
- Source
  - coordinates: 18.341389°N 66.318889°W
  - elevation: 262 ft.

The Río de los Negros is a river of Puerto Rico. It is located in the municipality of Corozal.

== See also ==
- List of rivers of Puerto Rico
