= Padilla, Corozal, Puerto Rico =

Barrio of Puerto Rico

Padilla
- Barrio
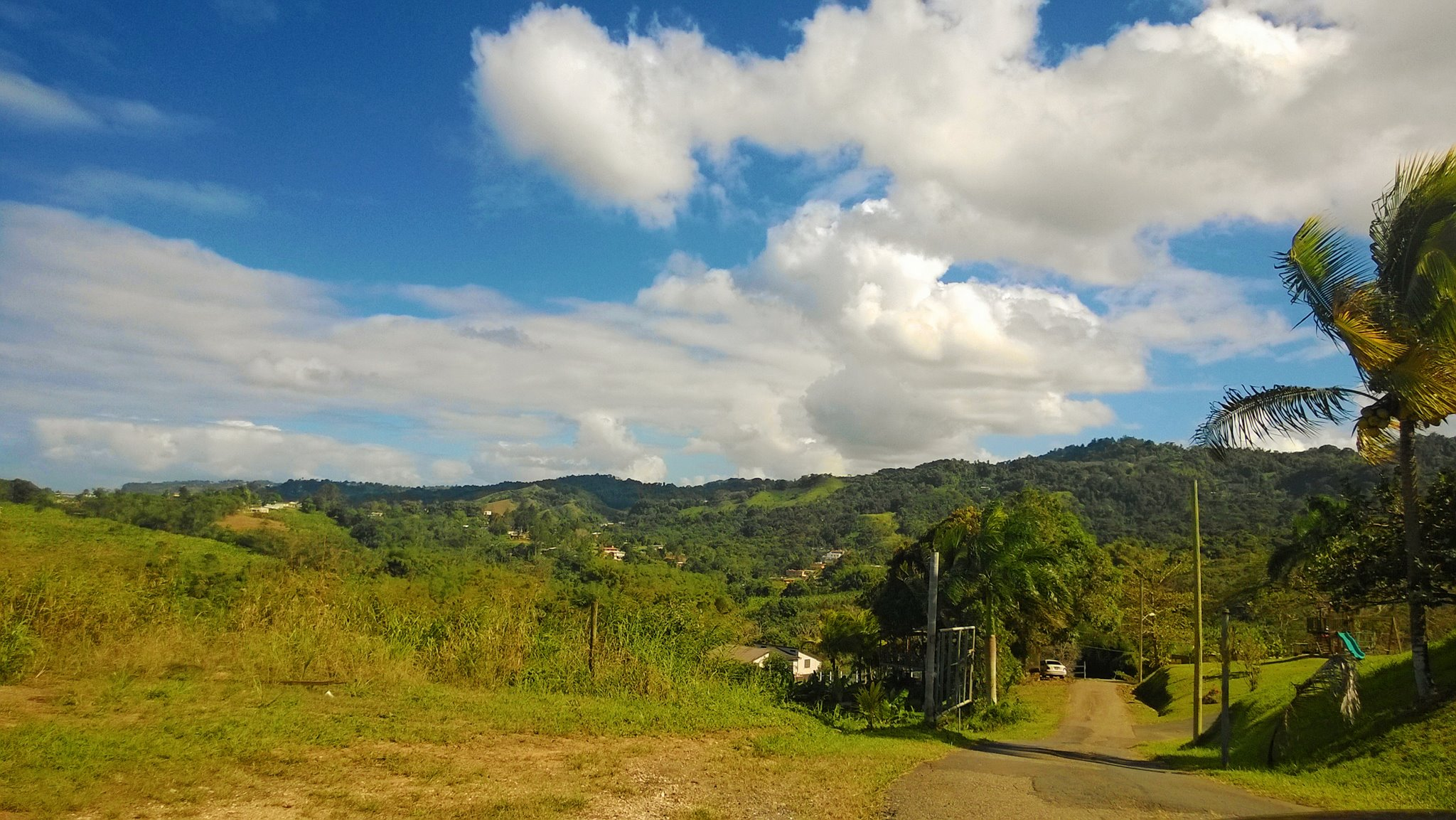
- Hills in Padilla

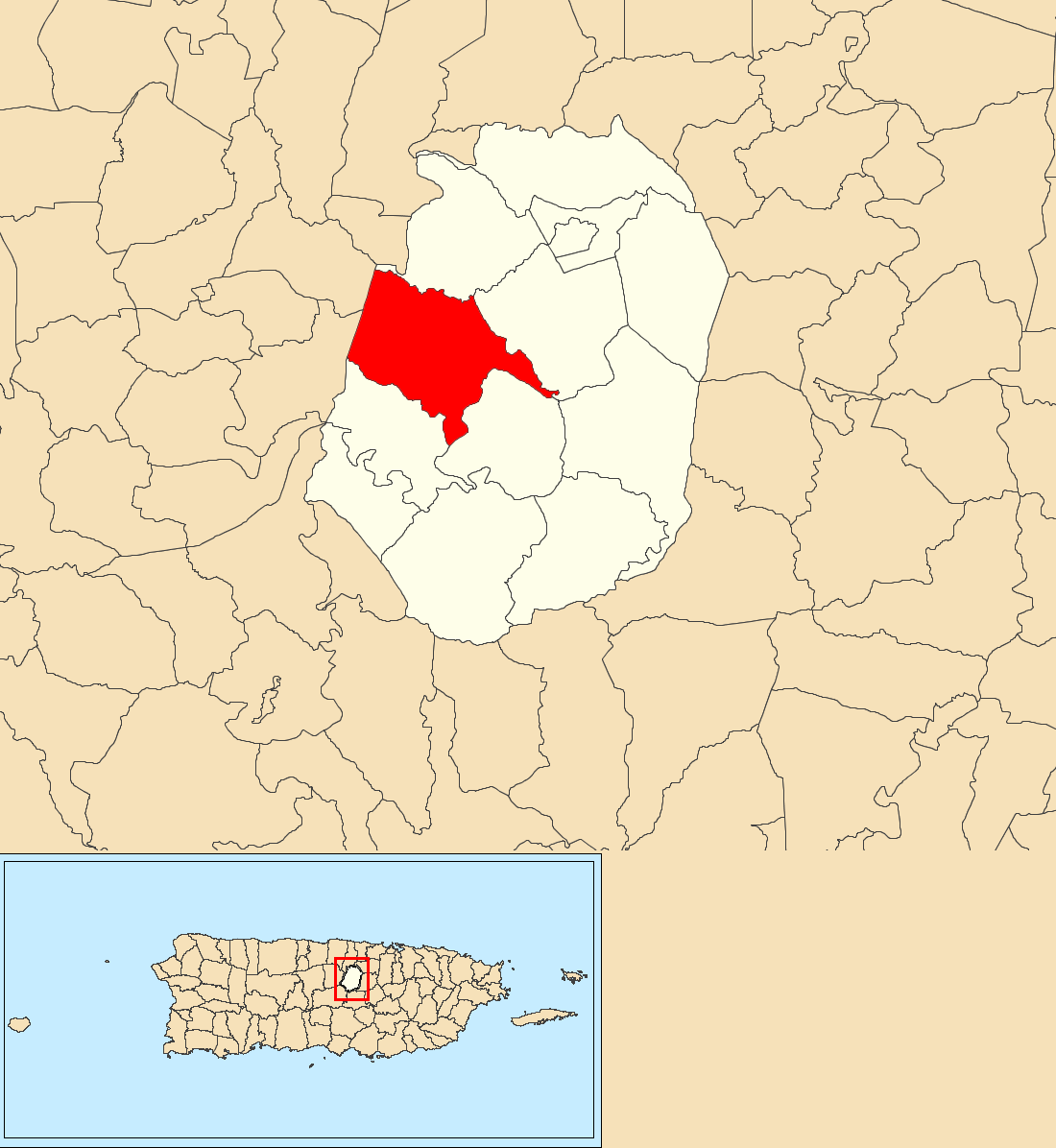
- Location of Padilla within the municipality of Corozal shown in red

- Location of Puerto Rico
- Coordinates: 18°18′46″N 66°21′14″W
- Commonwealth: Puerto Rico
- Municipality: Corozal

Area
  - Total: 4.46 sq mi (11.6 km^{2})
  - Land: 4.46 sq mi (11.6 km^{2})
  - Water: 0 sq mi (0 km^{2})
- Elevation: 758 ft (231 m)

Population (2010)
  - Total: 3,653
  - Density: 819.1/sq mi (316.3/km^{2})
- Source: 2010 Census
- Time zone: UTC−4 (AST)

Padilla is a rural barrio in the municipality of Corozal, Puerto Rico. Its population in 2010 was 3,653.

== History ==
Padilla was in Spain's gazetteers until Puerto Rico was ceded by Spain in the aftermath of the Spanish–American War under the terms of the Treaty of Paris of 1898 and became an unincorporated territory of the United States. In 1899, the United States Department of War conducted a census of Puerto Rico finding that the population of Padilla barrio was 840.

== Features and demographics ==
Padilla has 4.46 square miles (11.6 km^{2}) of land area and no water area. In 2010, its population was 3,653 with a population density of 819.1 inhabitants per square mile (316.3/km^{2}).

Historical population
Census	Pop.	Note	%±
1900	540		—
1910	890		64.8%
1920	1,116		25.4%
1930	1,167		4.6%
1940	1,703		45.9%
1950	1,990		16.9%
1960	1,851		−7.0%
1970	2,128		15.0%
1980	2,692		26.5%
1990	3,235		20.2%
2000	3,959		22.4%
2010	3,653		−7.7%
U.S. Decennial Census; 1899 (shown as 1900) 1910-1930; 1930-1950 1980-2000 2010

== Sectors ==
Barrios (which are, in contemporary times, roughly comparable to minor civil divisions) in turn are further subdivided into smaller local populated place areas/units called sectores (sectors in English). The types of sectores may vary, from normally sector to urbanización to reparto to barriada to residencial, among others.

The following sectors are in Padilla barrio:

=== Padilla ===
Sector Campo Viejo, Sector El Almendro, Sector El Jíbaro, Sector El Limón, Sector Empalme, Sector La Coroza, Sector La Guinea, Sector La Herradura, Sector Layo Rivera, Sector Los Baños, Sector Los Llanos, Sector Parcelas, Sector Pepito Marrero, Sector Virella, Urbanización Alturas de Padilla, and Urbanización La Providencia.

=== Padilla Ermita ===
Sector Collores, Sector Ermita, Sector Experimental, Sector Hormigas I, Sector Los Caobos, Sector Los Carrasco, Sector Los Figueroa, Sector Los Moreno, Sector Los Rodríguez, Sector Marungo, Sector Navarro, Sector Pablo Vázquez, and Sector Villarreal.

== See also ==
- List of communities in Puerto Rico
- List of barrios and sectors of Corozal, Puerto Rico
