= Negros, Corozal, Puerto Rico =

Barrio of Puerto Rico

Negros
- Barrio
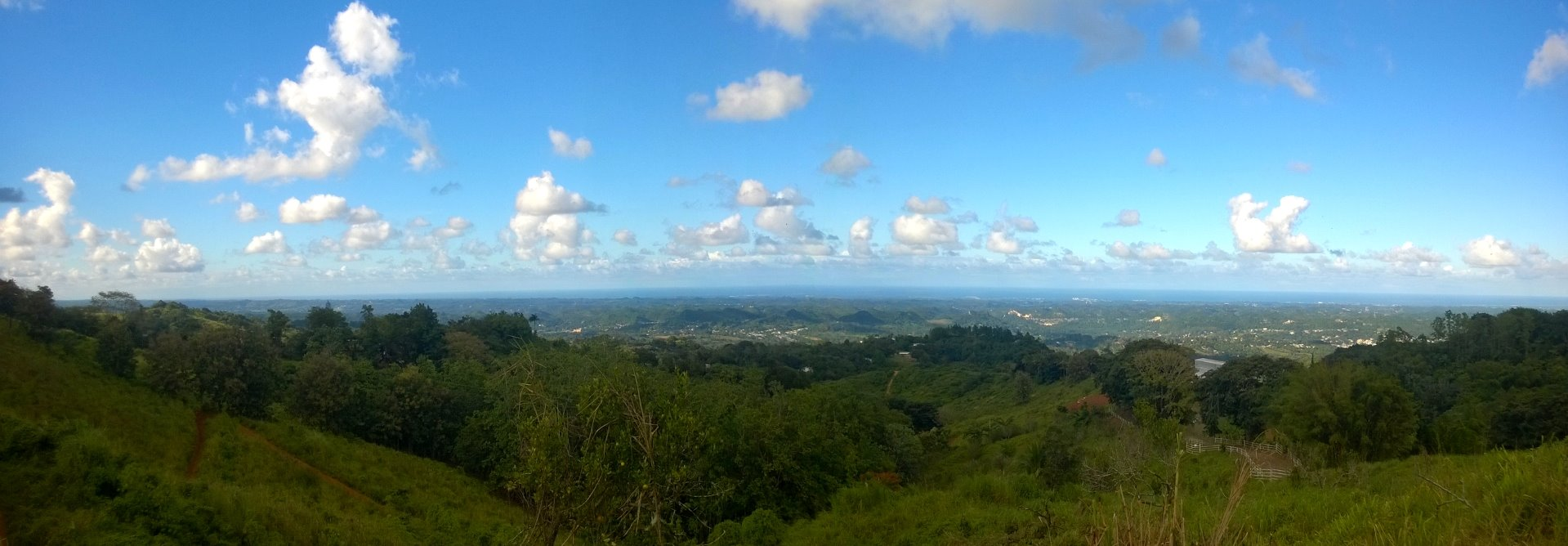
- View from Negros

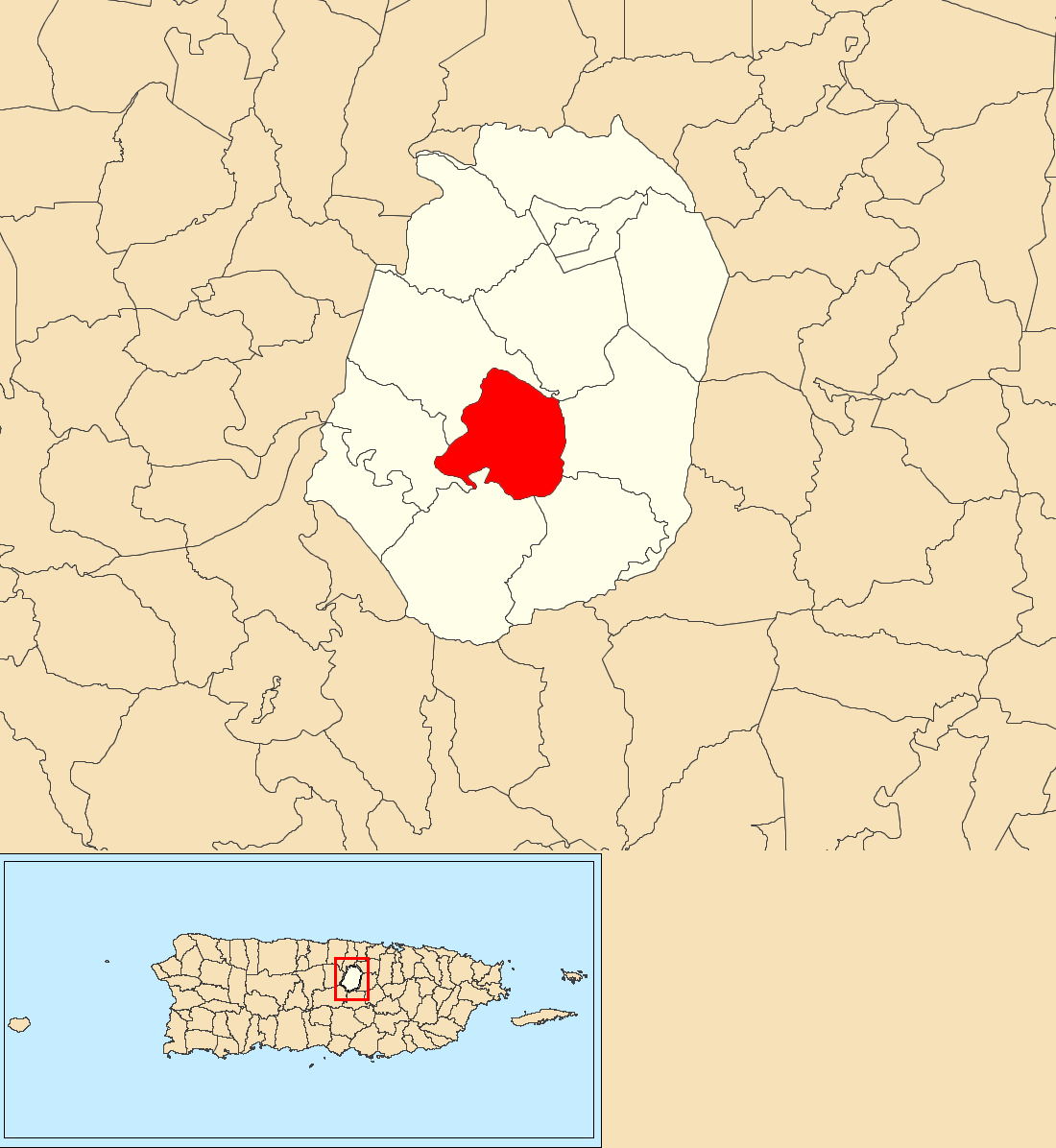
- Location of Negros within the municipality of Corozal shown in red

- Location of Puerto Rico
- Coordinates: 18°17′34″N 66°19′36″W
- Commonwealth: Puerto Rico
- Municipality: Corozal

Area
  - Total: 2.97 sq mi (7.7 km^{2})
  - Land: 2.97 sq mi (7.7 km^{2})
  - Water: 0 sq mi (0 km^{2})
- Elevation: 1,588 ft (484 m)

Population (2010)
  - Total: 1,398
  - Density: 470.7/sq mi (181.7/km^{2})
- Source: 2010 Census
- Time zone: UTC−4 (AST)

Negros is a rural barrio in the municipality of Corozal, Puerto Rico. Its population in 2010 was 1,398.

== History ==
Negros was in Spain's gazetteers until Puerto Rico was ceded by Spain in the aftermath of the Spanish–American War under the terms of the Treaty of Paris of 1898 and became an unincorporated territory of the United States. In 1899, the United States Department of War conducted a census of Puerto Rico finding that the population of Negros barrio was 818.

== Features and demographics ==
Negros has 2.97 square miles (7.7 km^{2}) of land area and no water area. In 2010, its population was 1,398 with a population density of 470.7 inhabitants per square mile (181.7/km^{2}).

Historical population
Census	Pop.	Note	%±
1900	818		—
1910	993		21.4%
1920	1,080		8.8%
1930	1,068		−1.1%
1940	1,297		21.4%
1950	1,117		−13.9%
1960	1,087		−2.7%
1970	911		−16.2%
1980	855		−6.1%
1990	1,001		17.1%
2000	1,239		23.8%
2010	1,398		12.8%
U.S. Decennial Census; 1899 (shown as 1900) 1910-1930; 1930-1950 1980-2000 2010

PR-805 is the main east-west road through Negros.

== Sectors ==
Barrios (which are, in contemporary times, roughly comparable to minor civil divisions) in turn are further subdivided into smaller local populated place areas/units called sectores (sectors in English). The types of sectores may vary, from normally sector to urbanización to reparto to barriada to residencial, among others.

The following sectors are in Negros barrio:

Sector Acueducto, Sector África, Sector Carretera (from Amado Suárez to Iglesia Católica), Sector La Hacienda, Sector La Planá, Sector Lorencito Frau, Sector Los Gatos, Sector Los Pérez, Sector Los Quiñones, Sector Parcelas, Sector Pepín García, and Urbanización Los Hermanos.

== Gallery ==
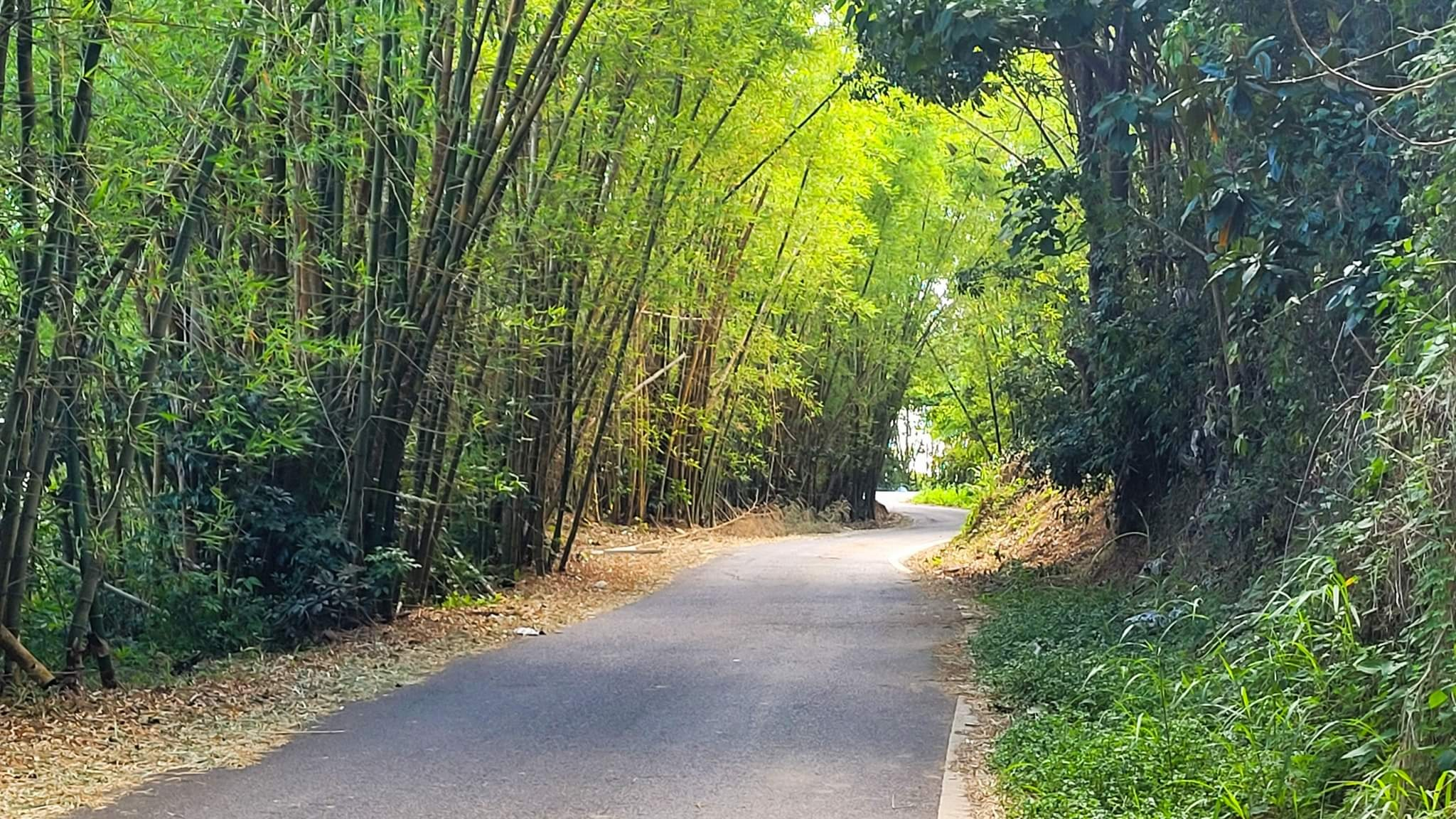
Puerto Rico Highway 568 in Negros

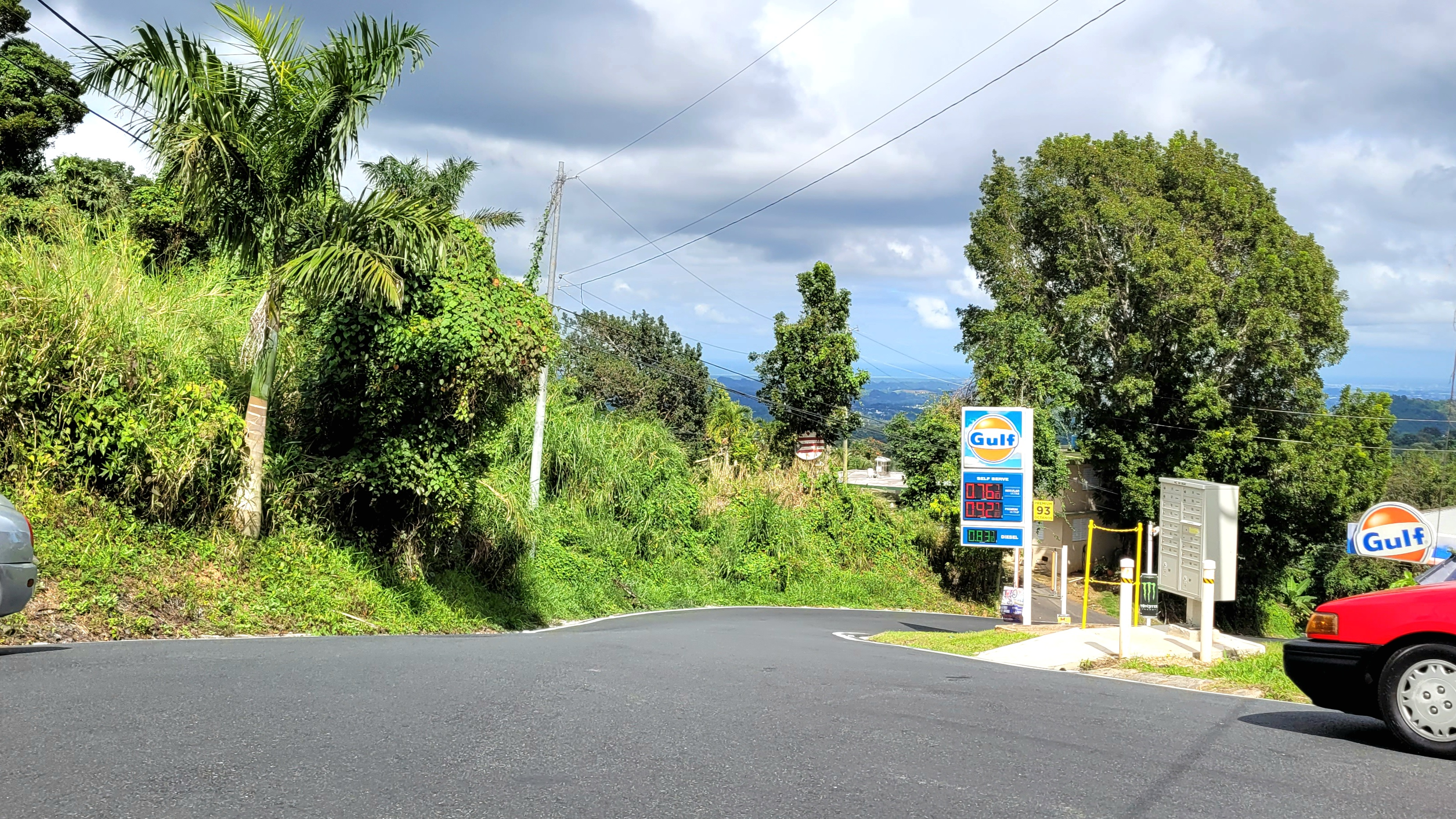
Puerto Rico Highway 807 between Palos Blancos and Negros

== See also ==
- List of communities in Puerto Rico
- List of barrios and sectors of Corozal, Puerto Rico
