= Iván González =

Iván González may refer to:

- Iván González (canoeist) (born 1964), Spanish canoeist
- Iván González (footballer, born 1987) (born 1987), Paraguayan footballer
- Iván González (footballer, born 1988) (born 1988), Spanish footballer
- Iván González (footballer, born 2006) (born 2006), Mexican footballer
- Ivan Gonzalez (comedian), member of British comedy duo Max and Ivan
- Iván Darío González (born 1987), Colombian middle and long-distance runner
- Iván Hernández González, Puerto Rican politician
