= Iván Hernández =

Iván Hernández may refer to:

- Iván Hernández (footballer) (born 1980), Spanish footballer
- Iván Hernández (boxer) (born 1982), Mexican boxer
- Iván Hernández González, Puerto Rican politician and former mayor of Vega Baja
- Iván Hernández (actor), actor in telenovelas such as Más sabe el diablo and Alguien Te Mira
- Iván Hernández (weightlifter) (born 1983), Spanish weightlifter
