= Quebrada Arenas, Vega Baja, Puerto Rico =

Barrio of Puerto Rico

Quebrada Arenas
- Barrio
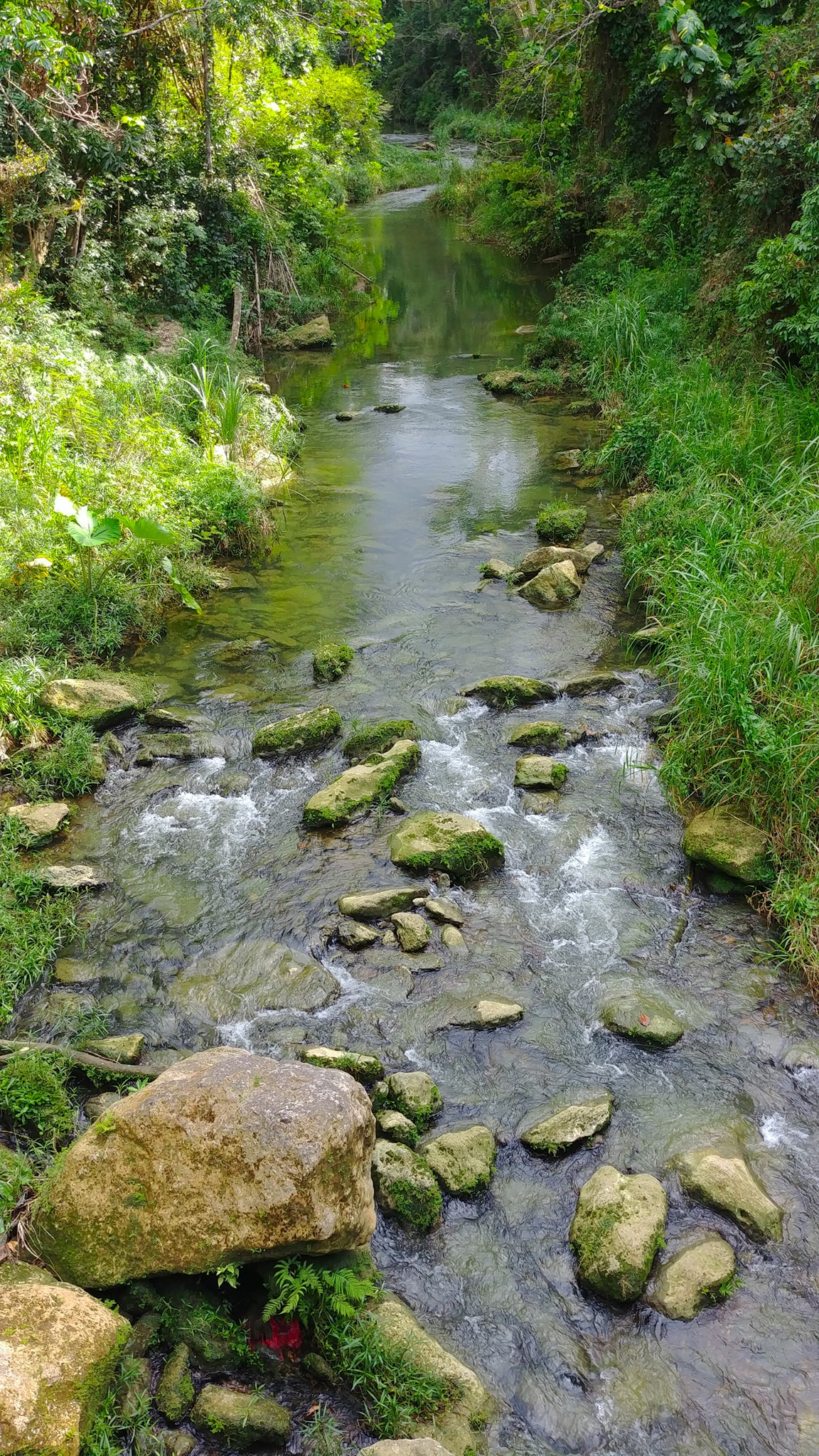
- Indio River between Quebrada Arenas and Almirante Sur

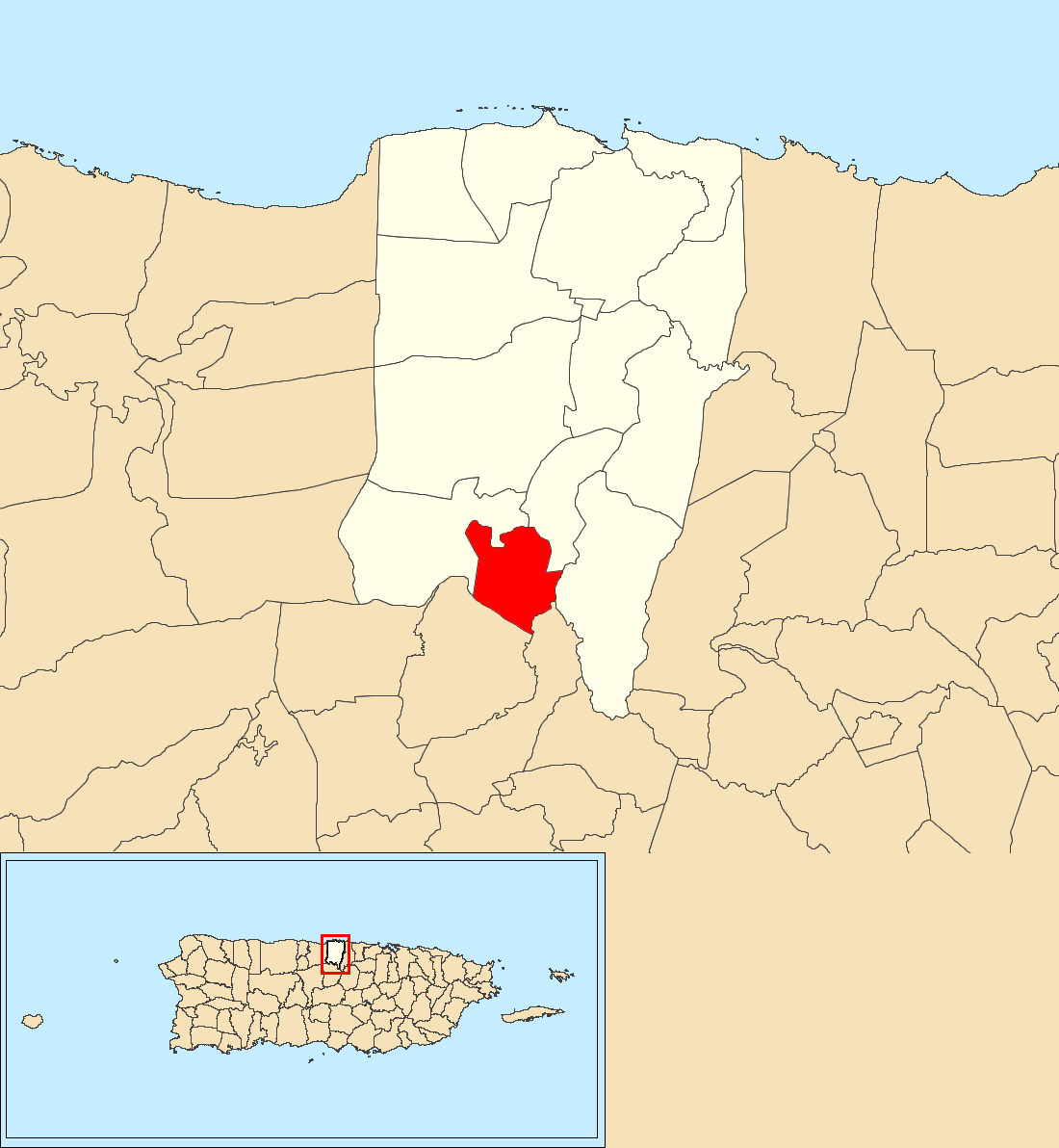
- Location of Quebrada Arenas within the municipality of Vega Baja shown in red

- Location of Puerto Rico
- Coordinates: 18°22′37″N 66°24′03″W
- Commonwealth: Puerto Rico
- Municipality: Vega Baja

Area
  - Total: 1.81 sq mi (4.7 km^{2})
  - Land: 1.81 sq mi (4.7 km^{2})
  - Water: 0 sq mi (0 km^{2})
- Elevation: 482 ft (147 m)

Population (2010)
  - Total: 773
  - Density: 424.7/sq mi (164.0/km^{2})
- Source: 2010 Census
- Time zone: UTC−4 (AST)

Quebrada Arenas is a barrio in the municipality of Vega Baja, Puerto Rico. Its population in 2010 was 773.

== History ==
Quebrada Arenas was in Spain's gazetteers until Puerto Rico was ceded by Spain in the aftermath of the Spanish–American War under the terms of the Treaty of Paris of 1898 and became an unincorporated territory of the United States. In 1899, the United States Department of War conducted a census of Puerto Rico finding that the population of Quebrada Arenas barrio was 348.

Historical population
Census	Pop.	Note	%±
1900	348		—
1910	365		4.9%
1920	442		21.1%
1930	657		48.6%
1940	777		18.3%
1950	823		5.9%
1960	583		−29.2%
1970	479		−17.8%
1980	631		31.7%
1990	603		−4.4%
2000	670		11.1%
2010	773		15.4%
U.S. Decennial Census; 1899 (shown as 1900) 1910-1930; 1930-1950 1960 1980-2000 2010

== See also ==
- List of communities in Puerto Rico
