= Marcos Cruz Molina =

Puerto Rican politician

Marcos Cruz

Mayor of Vega Baja
- Incumbent
- Assumed office January 14, 2013
- Preceded by: Iván Hernández González

Personal details
- Born: February 23, 1976 (age 50)
- Party: Popular Democratic Party (PPD)
- Education: University of Puerto Rico (B.Ed.)

Marcos Cruz is a Puerto Rican politician and the current mayor of Vega Baja. Cruz is affiliated with the Popular Democratic Party (PPD) and has served as mayor since 2013. Marcos Cruz earned a Bachelor of Arts in Education from the University of Puerto Rico, Río Piedras Campus.
