= Almirante Sur =

Barrio of Vega Baja, Puerto Rico

- Barrio
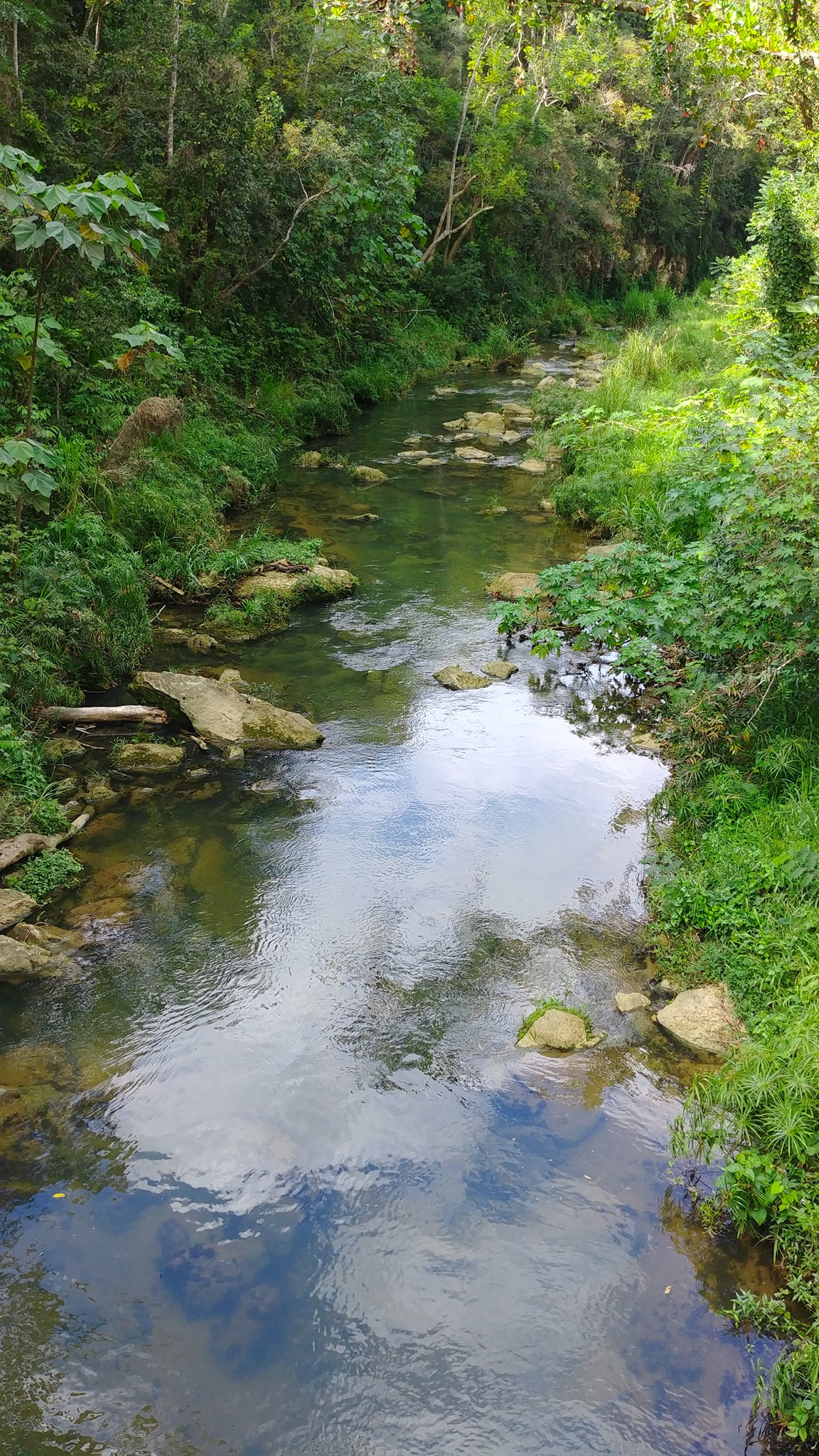
- Indio River between Almirante Sur and Quebrada Arenas

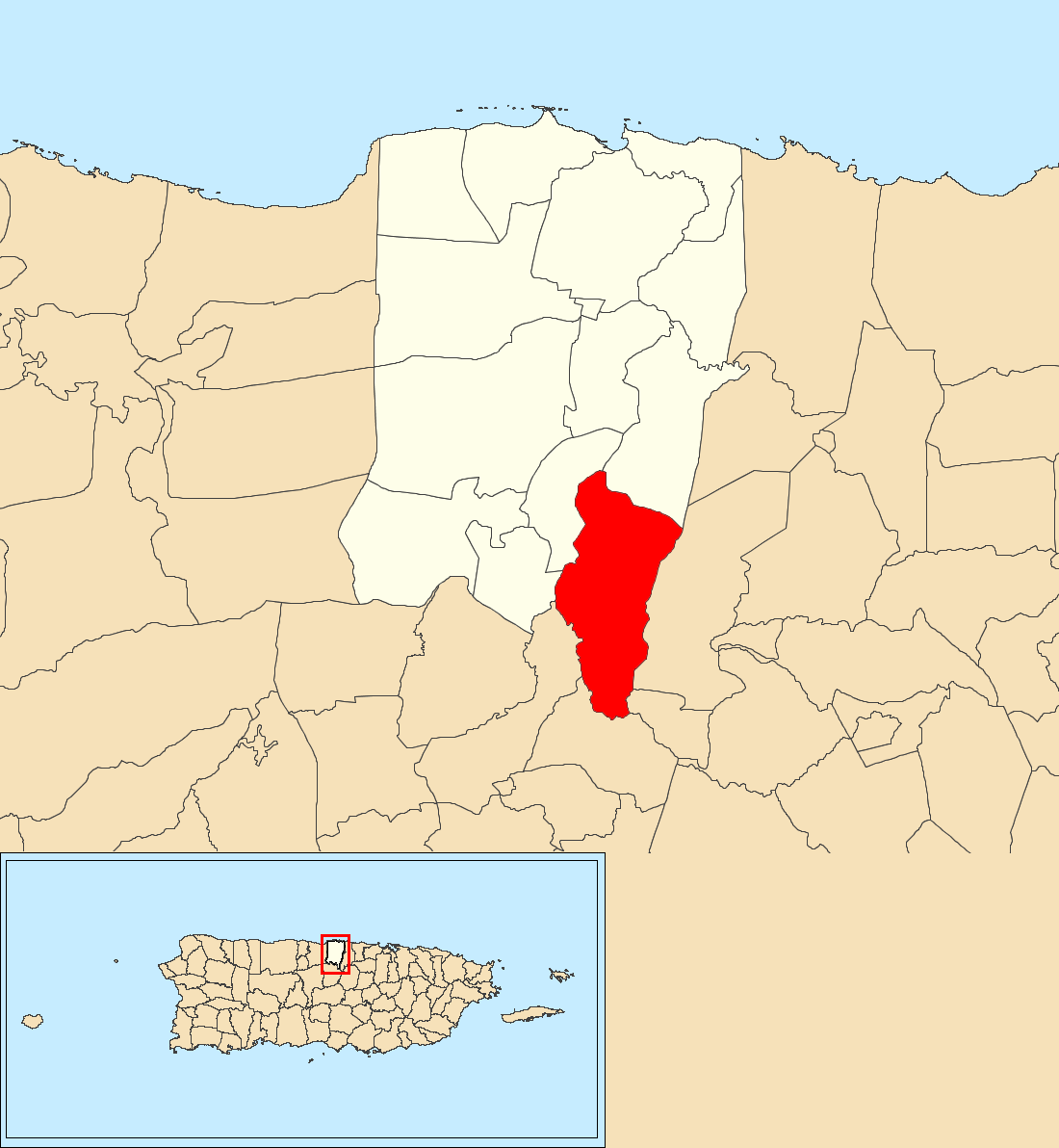
- Location of Almirante Sur within the municipality of Vega Baja shown in red

- Location of Puerto Rico
- Coordinates: 18°22′34″N 66°22′56″W
- Commonwealth: Puerto Rico
- Municipality: Vega Baja

Area
  - Total: 4.66 sq mi (12.1 km^{2})
  - Land: 4.66 sq mi (12.1 km^{2})
  - Water: 0 sq mi (0 km^{2})
- Elevation: 472 ft (144 m)

Population (2010)
  - Total: 3,115
  - Density: 668.5/sq mi (258.1/km^{2})
- Source: 2010 Census
- Time zone: UTC−4 (AST)

Almirante Sur is a barrio in the municipality of Vega Baja, Puerto Rico. Its population in 2010 was 3,115.

== History ==
Almirante Sur was in Spain's gazetteers until Puerto Rico was ceded by Spain in the aftermath of the Spanish–American War under the terms of the Treaty of Paris of 1898 and became an unincorporated territory of the United States. In 1899, the United States Department of War conducted a census of Puerto Rico finding that the population of Almirante Sur barrio was 847.

Historical population
Census	Pop.	Note	%±
1900	847		—
1910	1,019		20.3%
1920	1,286		26.2%
1930	1,590		23.6%
1940	1,994		25.4%
1950	2,330		16.9%
1960	2,238		−3.9%
1970	2,203		−1.6%
1980	2,788		26.6%
1990	2,962		6.2%
2000	3,325		12.3%
2010	3,115		−6.3%
U.S. Decennial Census; 1899 (shown as 1900) 1910-1930; 1930-1950 1960 1980-2000 2010

== Notable people ==
- Bad Bunny, Platinum rapper, singer, record producer, actor, and professional wrestler

== See also ==
- List of communities in Puerto Rico
