= Yeguada, Vega Baja, Puerto Rico =

Barrio of Puerto Rico

Yeguada
- Barrio
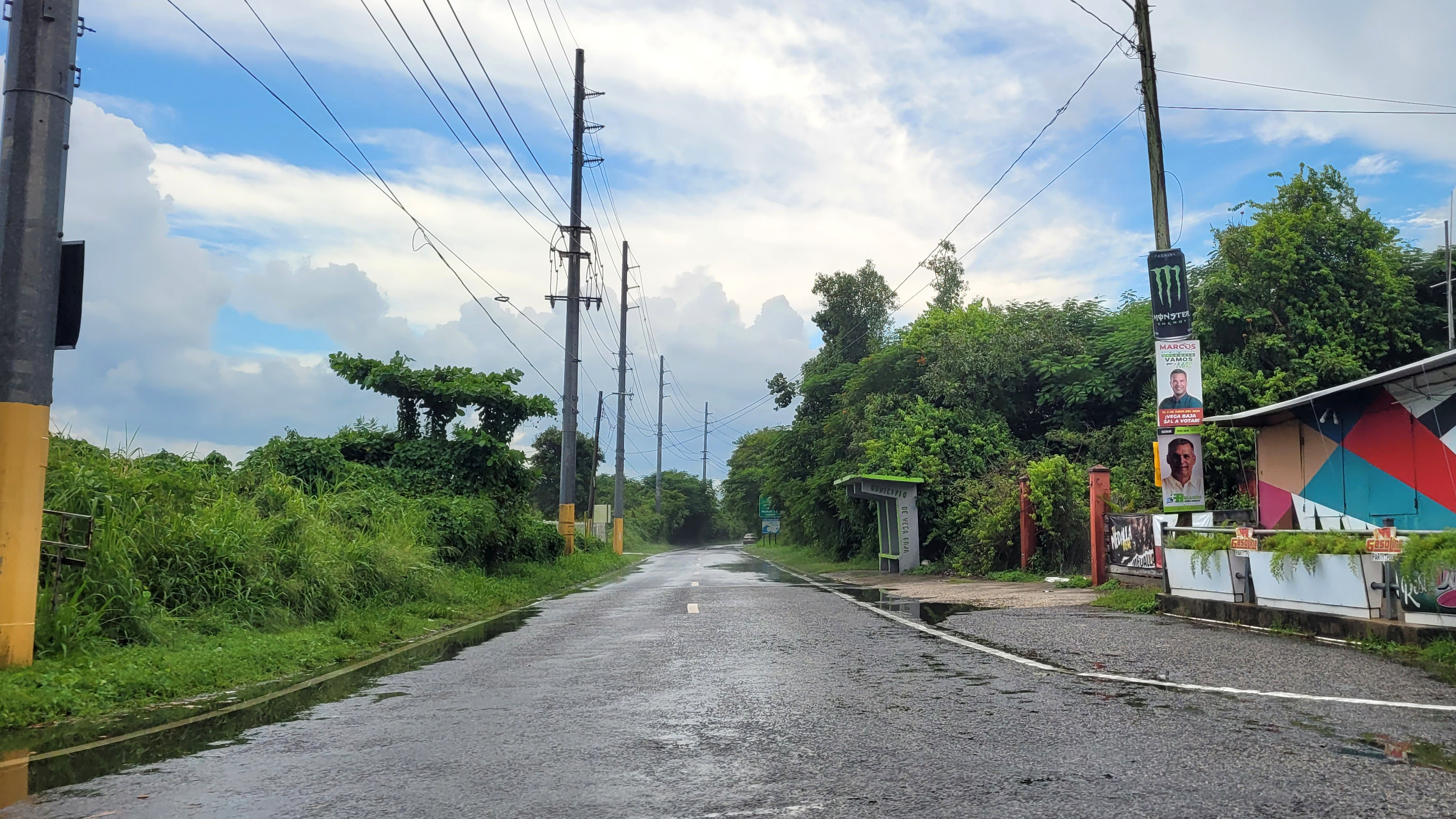
- Puerto Rico Highway 687 in Yeguada

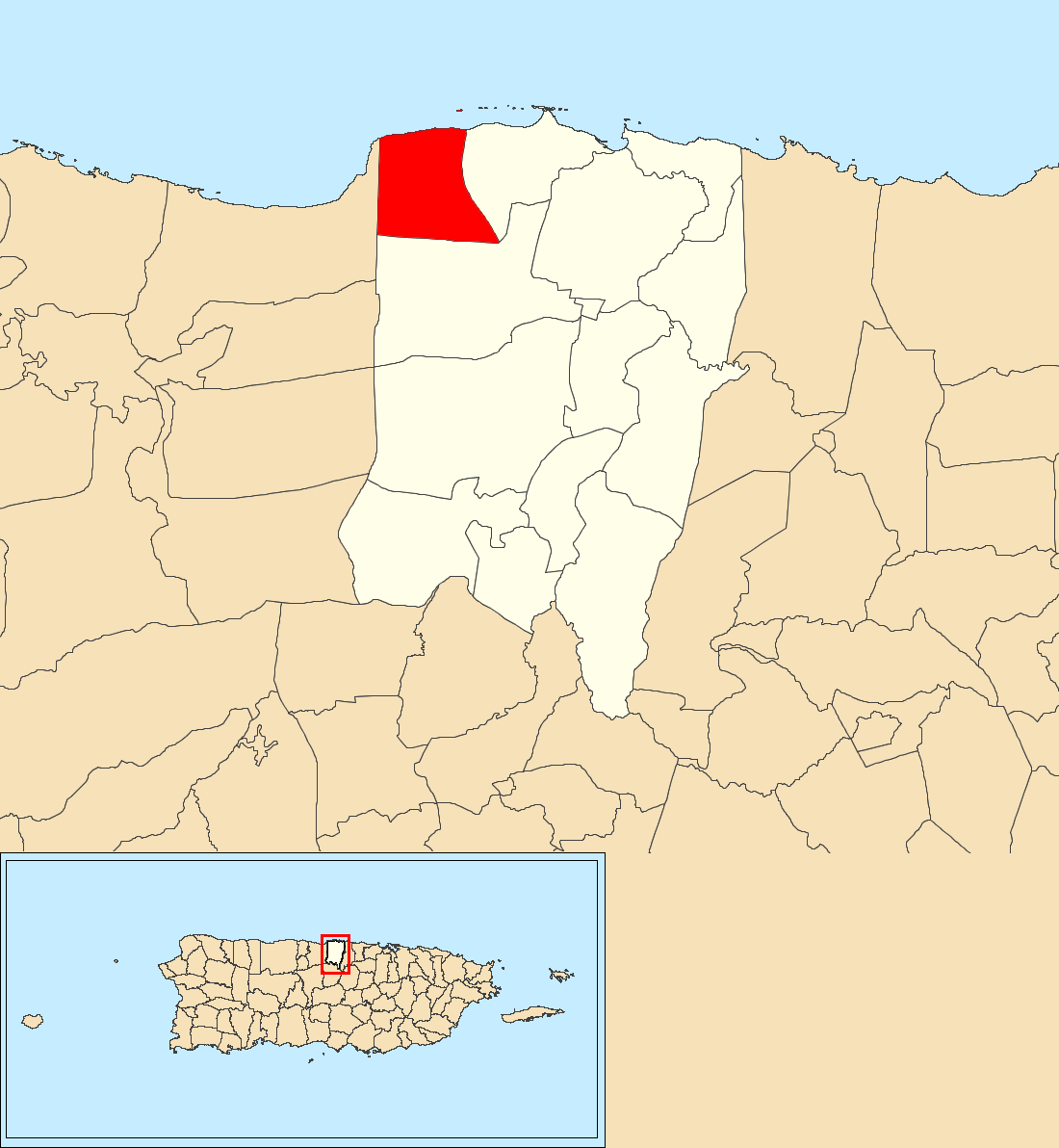
- Location of Yeguada within the municipality of Vega Baja shown in red

- Location of Puerto Rico
- Coordinates: 18°28′28″N 66°25′33″W
- Commonwealth: Puerto Rico
- Municipality: Vega Baja

Area
  - Total: 3.24 sq mi (8.4 km^{2})
  - Land: 2.46 sq mi (6.4 km^{2})
  - Water: 0.78 sq mi (2.0 km^{2})
- Elevation: 0 ft (0 m)

Population (2010)
  - Total: 1,932
  - Density: 785.4/sq mi (303.2/km^{2})
- Source: 2010 Census
- Time zone: UTC−4 (AST)

Yeguada is a barrio in the municipality of Vega Baja, Puerto Rico. Its population in 2010 was 1,932.

== History ==
Native people inhabited Yeguada, and the barrio later came to be known for the breeding of horses used for transportation.

Yeguada was in Spain's gazetteers until Puerto Rico was ceded by Spain in the aftermath of the Spanish–American War under the terms of the Treaty of Paris of 1898 and became an unincorporated territory of the United States. In 1899, the United States Department of War conducted a census of Puerto Rico finding that the population of Yeguada barrio was 428.

Historical population
Census	Pop.	Note	%±
1900	428		—
1910	668		56.1%
1920	655		−1.9%
1930	838		27.9%
1940	827		−1.3%
1950	502		−39.3%
1960	398		−20.7%
1970	372		−6.5%
1980	508		36.6%
1990	896		76.4%
2000	1,724		92.4%
2010	1,932		12.1%
U.S. Decennial Census; 1899 (shown as 1900) 1910-1930; 1930-1950 1960 1980-2000 2010

== Features ==
Part of the Laguna Tortuguero, a natural reservoir, is located in Yeguada.

== See also ==
- List of communities in Puerto Rico
