= Río Arriba, Vega Baja, Puerto Rico =

Barrio of Puerto Rico

Río Arriba
- Barrio
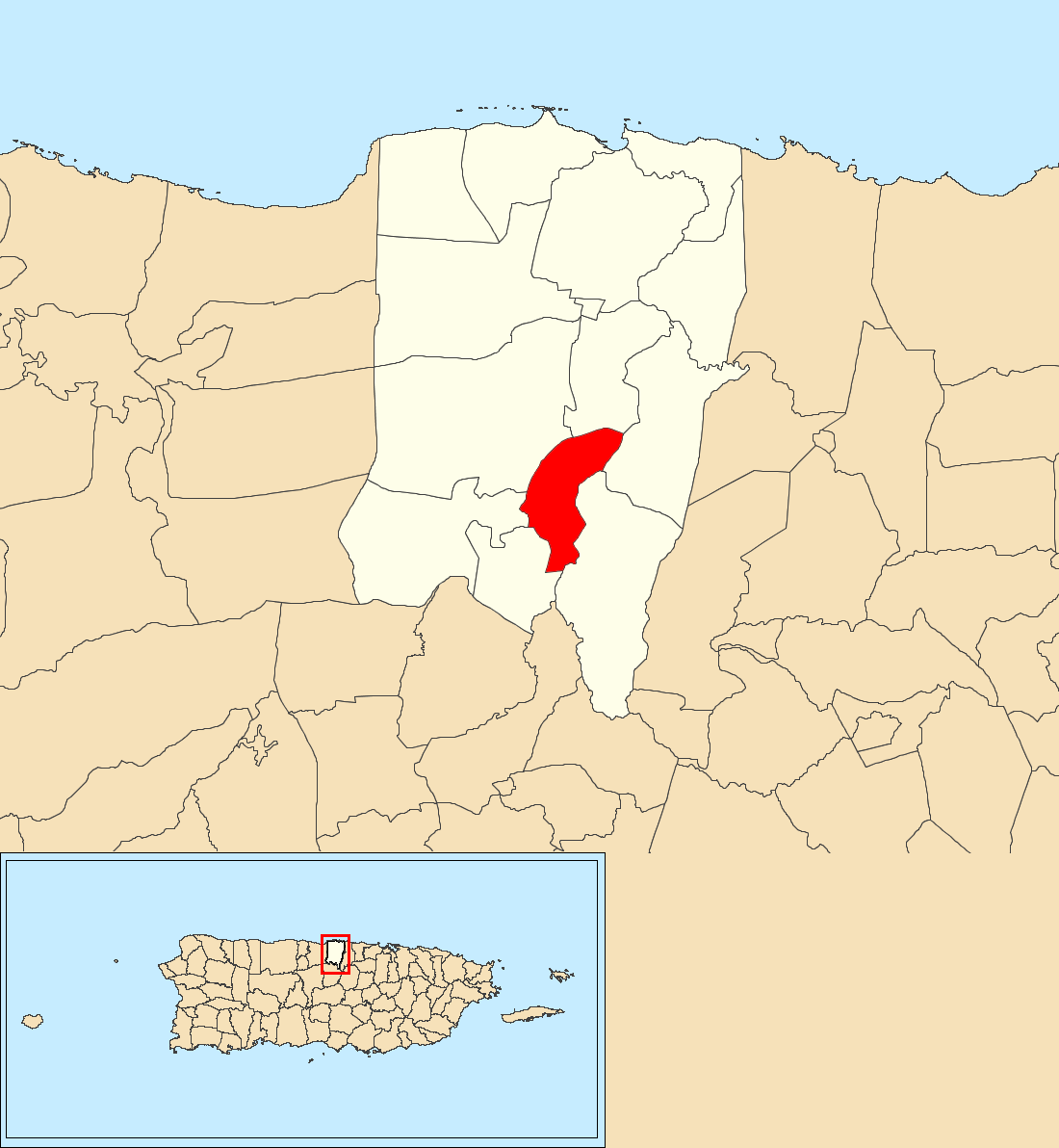
- Location of Río Arriba within the municipality of Vega Baja shown in red

- Location of Puerto Rico
- Coordinates: 18°24′15″N 66°23′13″W
- Commonwealth: Puerto Rico
- Municipality: Vega Baja

Area
  - Total: 1.85 sq mi (4.8 km^{2})
  - Land: 1.83 sq mi (4.7 km^{2})
  - Water: 0.02 sq mi (0.052 km^{2})
- Elevation: 331 ft (101 m)

Population (2010)
  - Total: 352
  - Density: 192.3/sq mi (74.2/km^{2})
- Source: 2010 Census
- Time zone: UTC−4 (AST)

Río Arriba is a barrio in the municipality of Vega Baja, Puerto Rico. Its population in 2010 was 352.

== History ==
Río Arriba was in Spain's gazetteers until Puerto Rico was ceded by Spain in the aftermath of the Spanish–American War under the terms of the Treaty of Paris of 1898 and became an unincorporated territory of the United States. In 1899, the United States Department of War conducted a census of Puerto Rico finding that the combined population of Río Arriba and Río Abajo barrios was 1,092.

Historical population
Census	Pop.	Note	%±
1910	564		—
1920	569		0.9%
1930	564		−0.9%
1940	585		3.7%
1950	484		−17.3%
1960	297		−38.6%
1970	233		−21.5%
1980	252		8.2%
1990	308		22.2%
2000	451		46.4%
2010	352		−22.0%
U.S. Decennial Census; 1900 (N/A) 1910-1930; 1930-1950 1960 1980-2000 2010

== See also ==
- List of communities in Puerto Rico
