= Edgar Santana Rivera =

Puerto Rican mayor

Edgar Santana

Mayor of Vega Baja
- In office January 11, 2005 – February 6, 2011
- Preceded by: Luis Meléndez
- Succeeded by: Iván Hernández González

Personal details
- Party: New Progressive Party (PNP)
- Occupation: Politician

Edgar Santana Rivera is a Puerto Rican politician and former mayor of Vega Baja.

Santana ran for mayor of Vega Baja at the 2000 general elections, but lost to the candidate of the Popular Democratic Party, Luis Meléndez. At the 2004 elections, Santana ran again, this time defeating the PPD candidate. He was reelected at the 2008 elections.

In 2010, a judge found cause for arrest against Santana for 18 charges of bribery. According to the accusations, Santana asked contractors for money in exchange of contracts in the municipality. Although maintaining his innocence, Santana resigned in February 2011, after a judge found cause for trial against him.

In October, the PNP disqualified Santana for reelection at the upcoming elections on the same day that his trial began. After about two weeks of trial, Santana was found guilty of all charges and immediately arrested. In December, he was sentenced to 18 years in prison.
