= Cibuco, Vega Baja, Puerto Rico =

Barrio of Puerto Rico

Cibuco
- Barrio
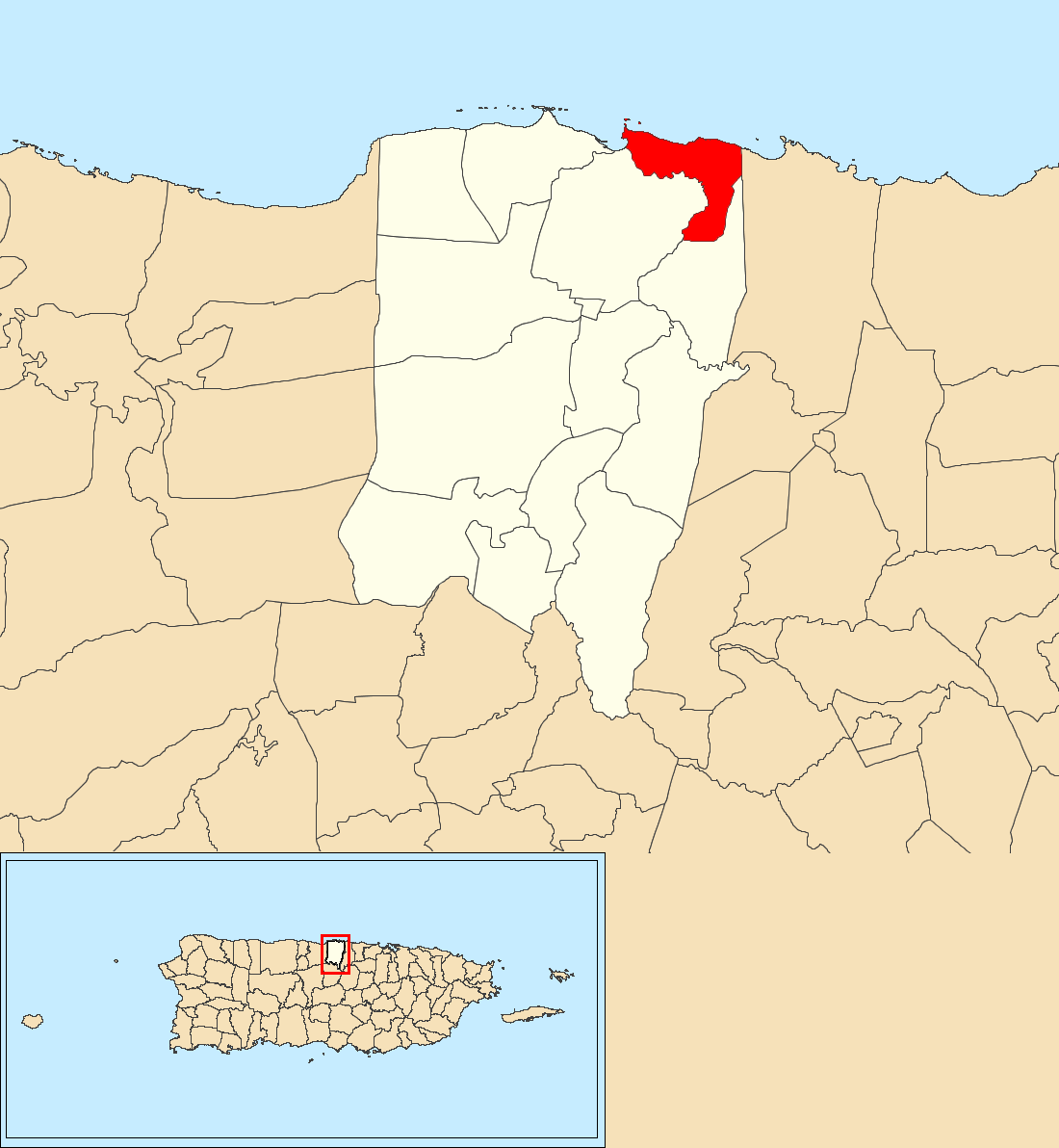
- Location of Cibuco within the municipality of Vega Baja shown in red

- Location of Puerto Rico
- Coordinates: 18°28′52″N 66°21′49″W
- Commonwealth: Puerto Rico
- Municipality: Vega Baja

Area
  - Total: 2.42 sq mi (6.3 km^{2})
  - Land: 1.65 sq mi (4.3 km^{2})
  - Water: 0.77 sq mi (2.0 km^{2})
- Elevation: 7 ft (2.1 m)

Population (2010)
  - Total: 50
  - Density: 30.3/sq mi (11.7/km^{2})
- Source: 2010 Census
- Time zone: UTC−4 (AST)

Cibuco is a barrio in the municipality of Vega Baja, Puerto Rico, United States. Its population in 2010 was 50.

== History ==
Cibuco was in Spain's gazetteers until Puerto Rico was ceded by Spain in the aftermath of the Spanish–American War under the terms of the Treaty of Paris of 1898 and became an unincorporated territory of the United States. In 1899, the United States Department of War conducted a census of Puerto Rico finding that the population of Cibuco barrio was 310.

Historical population
Census	Pop.	Note	%±
1900	310		—
1910	165		−46.8%
1920	376		127.9%
1930	595		58.2%
1940	263		−55.8%
1950	264		0.4%
1960	42		−84.1%
1970	63		50.0%
1980	55		−12.7%
1990	490		790.9%
2000	54		−89.0%
2010	50		−7.4%
U.S. Decennial Census; 1899 (shown as 1900) 1910-1930; 1930-1950 1960 1980-2000 2010

== See also ==
- List of communities in Puerto Rico
