= Ceiba, Vega Baja, Puerto Rico =

Barrio of Puerto Rico

Ceiba
- Barrio
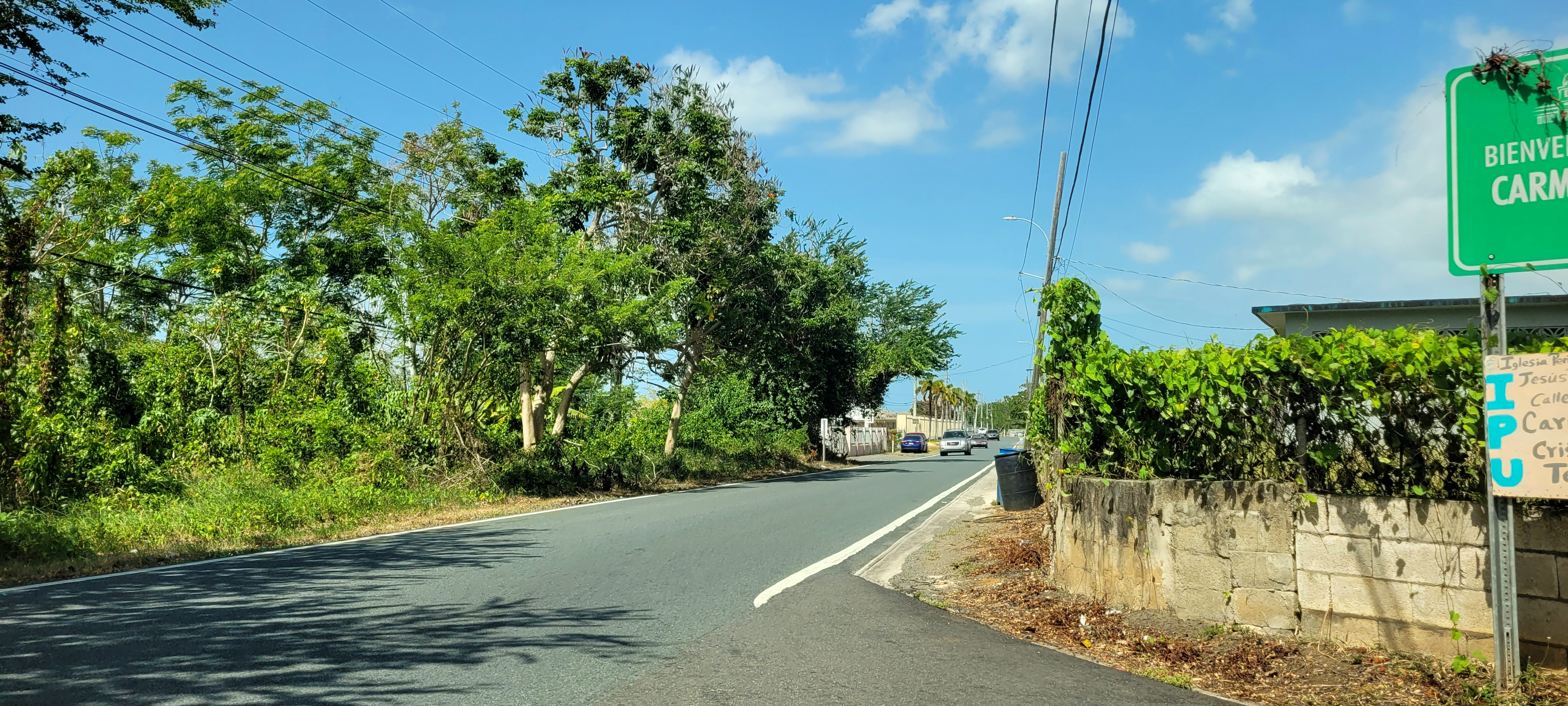
- Puerto Rico Highway 689 in Ceiba barrio

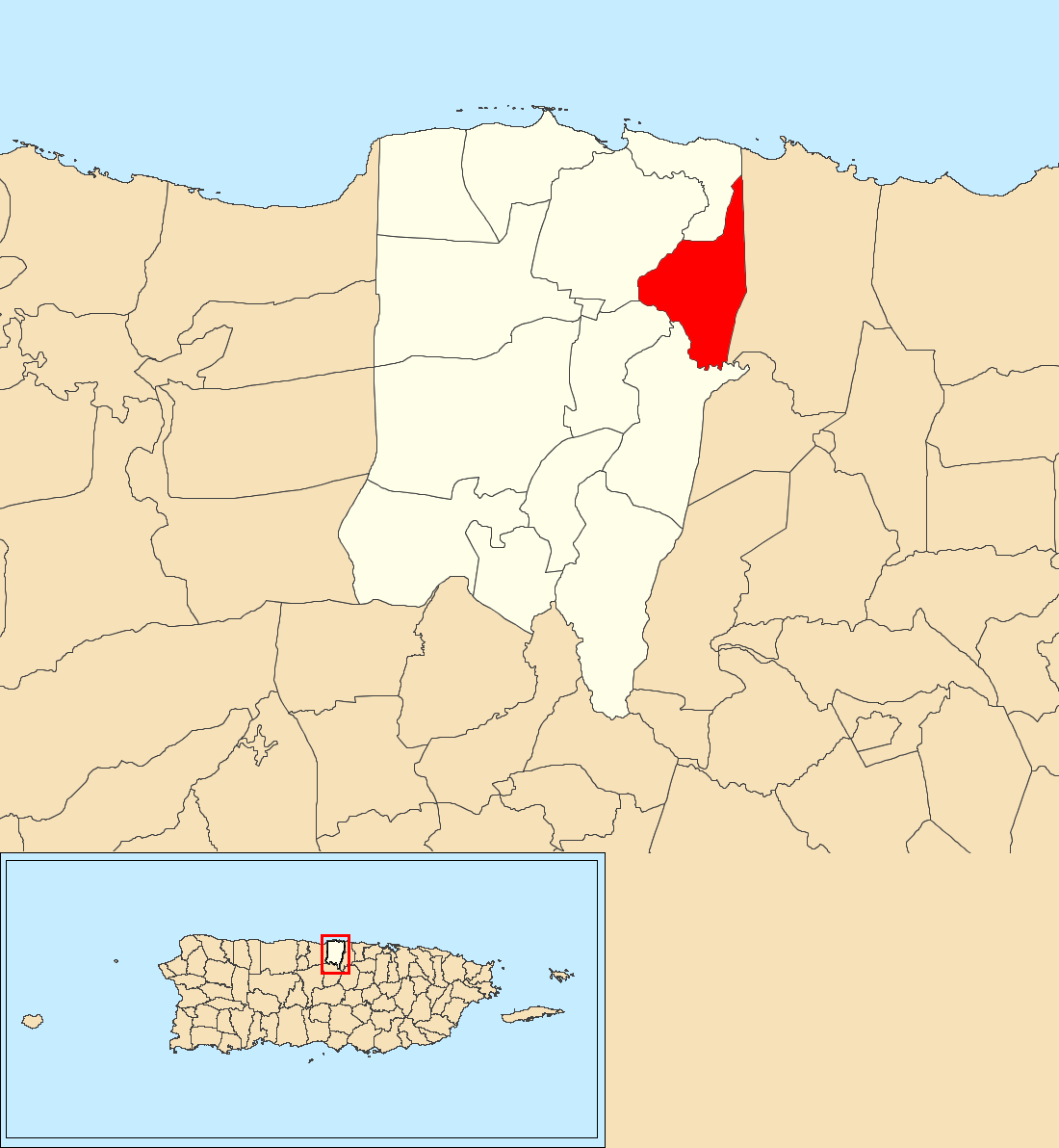
- Location of Ceiba within the municipality of Vega Baja shown in red

- Location of Puerto Rico
- Coordinates: 18°26′54″N 66°21′35″W
- Commonwealth: Puerto Rico
- Municipality: Vega Baja

Area
  - Total: 2.74 sq mi (7.1 km^{2})
  - Land: 2.72 sq mi (7.0 km^{2})
  - Water: 0.02 sq mi (0.052 km^{2})
- Elevation: 10 ft (3.0 m)

Population (2010)
  - Total: 4,685
  - Density: 1,722.4/sq mi (665.0/km^{2})
- Source: 2010 Census
- Time zone: UTC−4 (AST)

Ceiba is a barrio in the municipality of Vega Baja, Puerto Rico. Its population in 2010 was 4,685.

== History ==
Ceiba was in Spain's gazetteers until Puerto Rico was ceded by Spain in the aftermath of the Spanish–American War under the terms of the Treaty of Paris of 1898 and became an unincorporated territory of the United States. In 1899, the United States Department of War conducted a census of Puerto Rico finding that the population of Ceiba barrio was 469.

Historical population
Census	Pop.	Note	%±
1900	469		—
1910	886		88.9%
1920	573		−35.3%
1930	976		70.3%
1940	1,432		46.7%
1950	2,936		105.0%
1960	3,336		13.6%
1970	4,115		23.4%
1980	4,637		12.7%
1990	5,063		9.2%
2000	5,392		6.5%
2010	4,685		−13.1%
U.S. Decennial Census; 1899 (shown as 1900) 1910-1930; 1930-1950 1960 1980-2000 2010

== See also ==
- List of communities in Puerto Rico
