= Iván Hernández González =

Puerto Rican politician

Mayor of Vega Baja
- In office December 20, 2011 – January 13, 2013
- Preceded by: Edgar Santana
- Succeeded by: Marcos Cruz Molina

Personal details
- Party: New Progressive Party (PNP)
- Spouse: Diana L. Soto
- Children: 2
- Education: BS in Civil Engineering & Master in Engineering Management
- Alma mater: University of Puerto Rico at Mayagüez

Iván Hernández González is a Puerto Rican politician and former mayor of Vega Baja. Hernández is affiliated with the New Progressive Party (PNP) and served as mayor from 2011 to 2013.

Hernández served as President of the Municipal Legislature of Vega Baja since 2006. When mayor Edgar Santana was convicted in 2011, Hernández was selected to replace him in an assembly on December 7, 2011. He was sworn in on December 20, 2011.

Hernández was defeated at the 2012 general election by the candidate of the Popular Democratic Party, Marcos Cruz Molina.
