= Río Abajo, Vega Baja, Puerto Rico =

Barrio in Vega Baja, Puerto Rico

Río Abajo
- Barrio
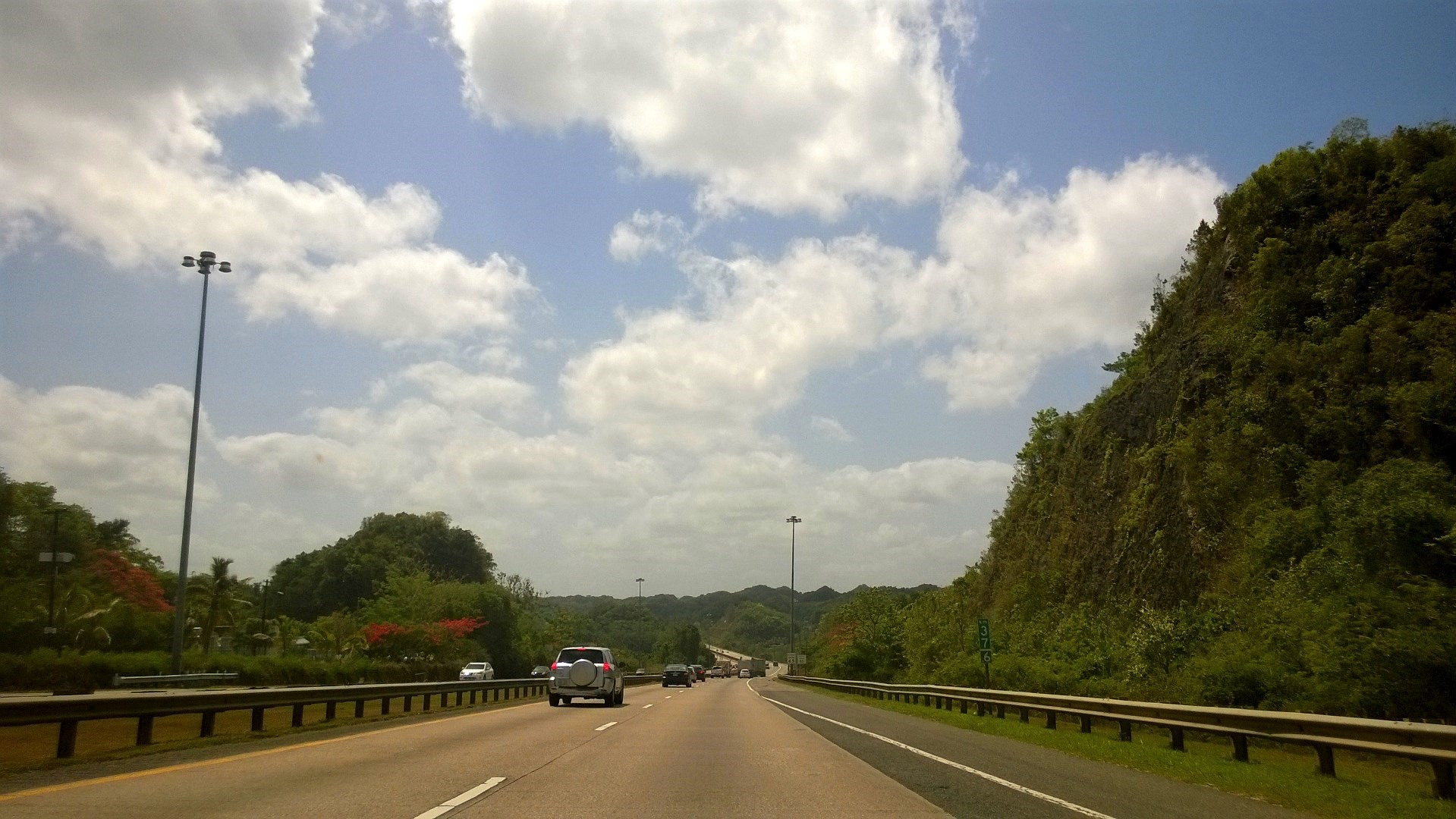
- Puerto Rico Highway 22 in Río Abajo

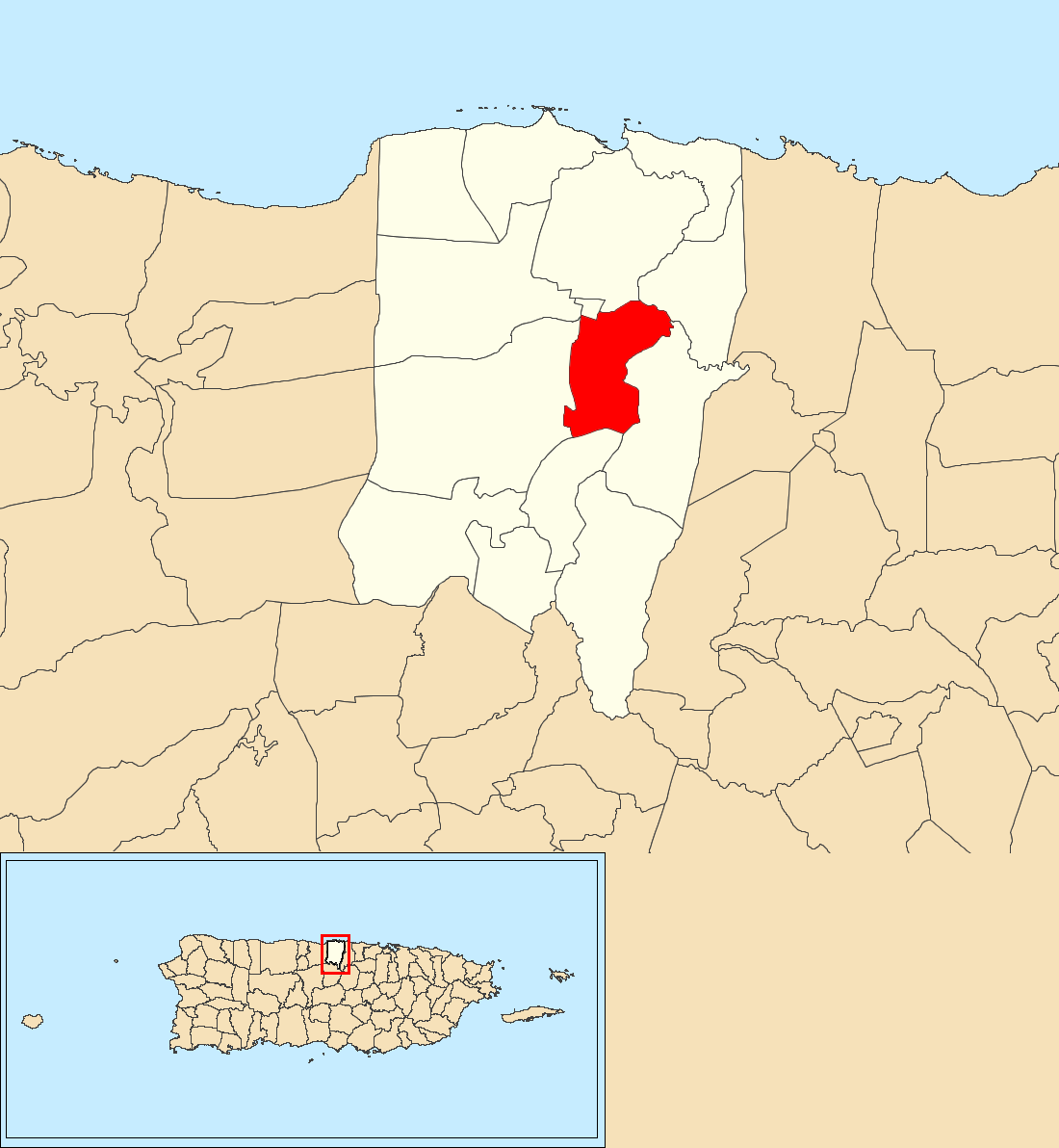
- Location of Río Abajo within the municipality of Vega Baja shown in red

- Location of Puerto Rico
- Coordinates: 18°25′47″N 66°22′56″W
- Commonwealth: Puerto Rico
- Municipality: Vega Baja

Area
  - Total: 2.40 sq mi (6.2 km^{2})
  - Land: 2.36 sq mi (6.1 km^{2})
  - Water: 0.04 sq mi (0.10 km^{2})
- Elevation: 39 ft (12 m)

Population (2010)
  - Total: 4,795
  - Density: 2,031.8/sq mi (784.5/km^{2})
- Source: 2010 Census
- Time zone: UTC−4 (AST)

Río Abajo is a barrio in the municipality of Vega Baja, Puerto Rico. Its population in 2010 was 4,795.

== History ==
Río Abajo was in Spain's gazetteers until Puerto Rico was ceded by Spain in the aftermath of the Spanish–American War under the terms of the Treaty of Paris of 1898 and became an unincorporated territory of the United States. In 1899, the United States Department of War conducted a census of Puerto Rico finding that the combined population of Río Abajo and Río Arriba barrios was 1,092.

Historical population
Census	Pop.	Note	%±
1910	733		—
1920	962		31.2%
1930	1,519		57.9%
1940	2,079		36.9%
1950	3,387		62.9%
1960	3,603		6.4%
1970	0		−100.0%
1980	4,512		—
1990	5,656		25.4%
2000	5,620		−0.6%
2010	4,795		−14.7%
U.S. Decennial Census; 1900 (N/A) 1910-1930; 1930-1950 1960 1980-2000 2010

== Gallery ==
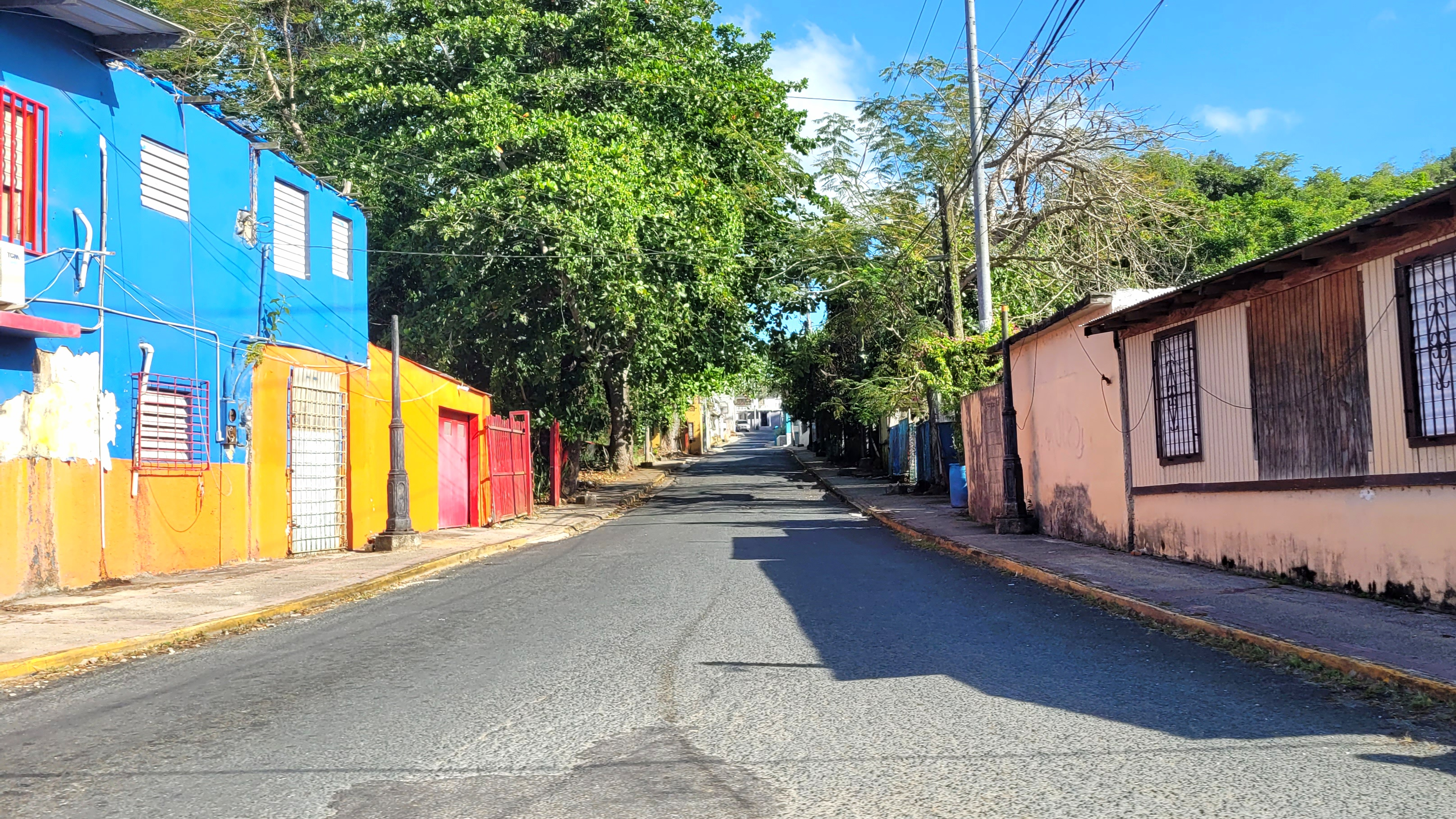
Puerto Rico Highway 674 in Río Abajo

== See also ==
- List of communities in Puerto Rico
