= Iván González (footballer, born 2006) =

Mexican footballer (born 2006)

Ivan González
Personal information
- Full name: Ivan Mauricio González Cataño
- Date of birth: 6 October 2006 (age 20)
- Place of birth: Los Mochis, Sinaloa, Mexico
- Height: 1.72 m (5 ft 8 in)
- Position: Forward

Team information
- Current team: Juárez
- Number: 193

Youth career
- 2021–2026: Mazatlán
- 2026–: Juárez

Senior career*
Years	Team	Apps	(Gls)
2025–2026	Mazatlán	9	(0)
2026–	Juárez	0	(0)
- * Club domestic league appearances and goals as of 19 June 2026

Ivan Mauricio González Cataño (born 6 October 2006) is a Mexican professional footballer who plays as a forward for Liga MX club Juárez.

== Club career ==
González began his career at the academy of Mazatlán, where he made his professional debut on 2 August 2025 in a 2–0 Leagues Cup match against Houston Dynamo, playing 63 minutes as a starter and on 30 August, he made his Liga MX in a 0–1 loss to Juárez, playing the first half and getting a yellow card.

On 19 June 2026, González signed with Juárez.

== Career statistics ==
=== Club ===
As of 19 June 2026

Appearances and goals by club, season and competition
Club	Season	League			Cup		Continental		Other		Total	
Club	Season	Division	Apps	Goals	Apps	Goals	Apps	Goals	Apps	Goals	Apps	Goals
Mazatlán	2025–26	Liga MX	9	0	—		—		1 (Note: Appearances in Leagues Cup)	0	9	0
Career total			9	0	0	0	0	0	1	0	10	0
