= Vega Baja, Puerto Rico =

Town and municipality in Puerto Rico

Vega Baja Municipio Autónomo de Vega Baja
- City and municipality
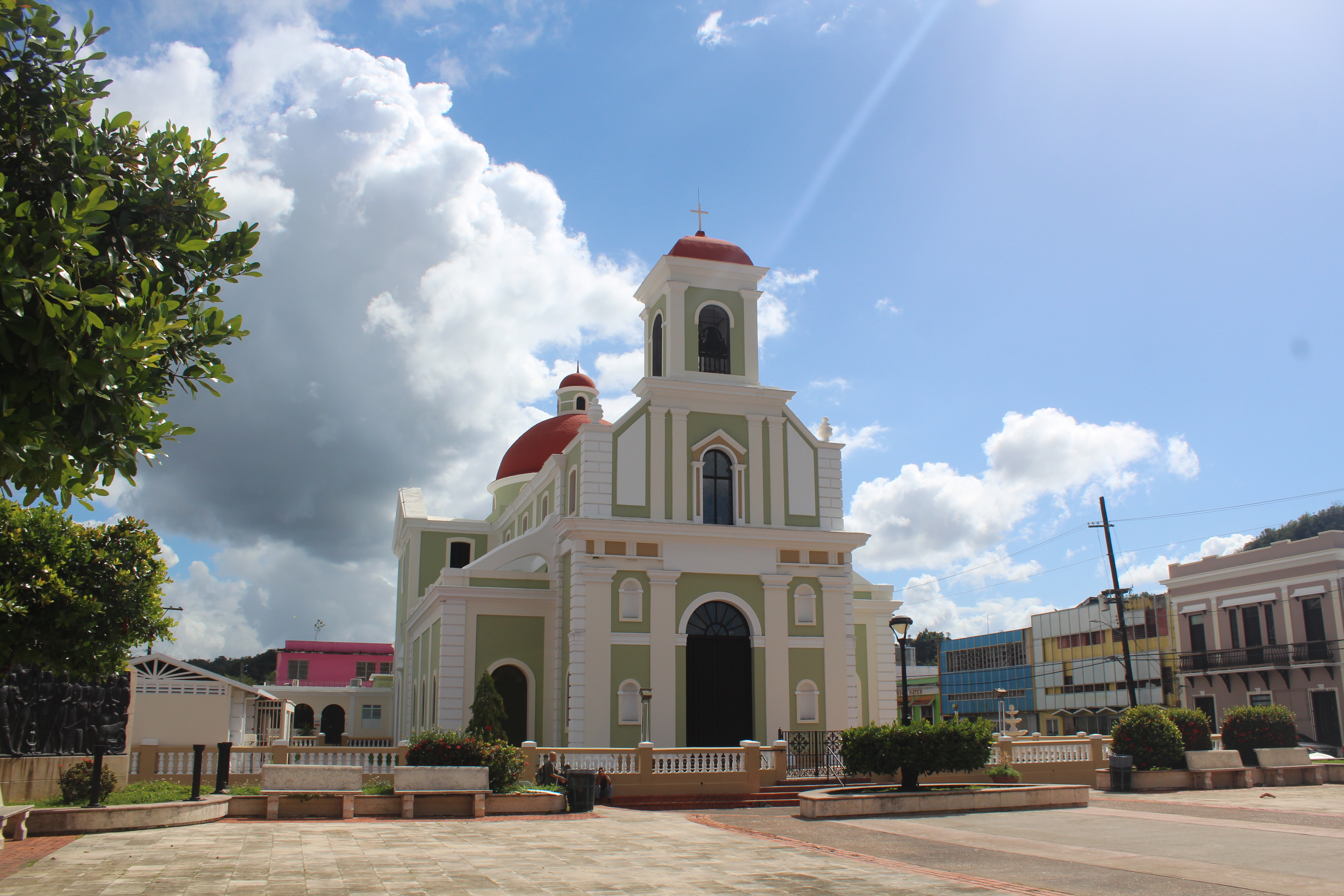
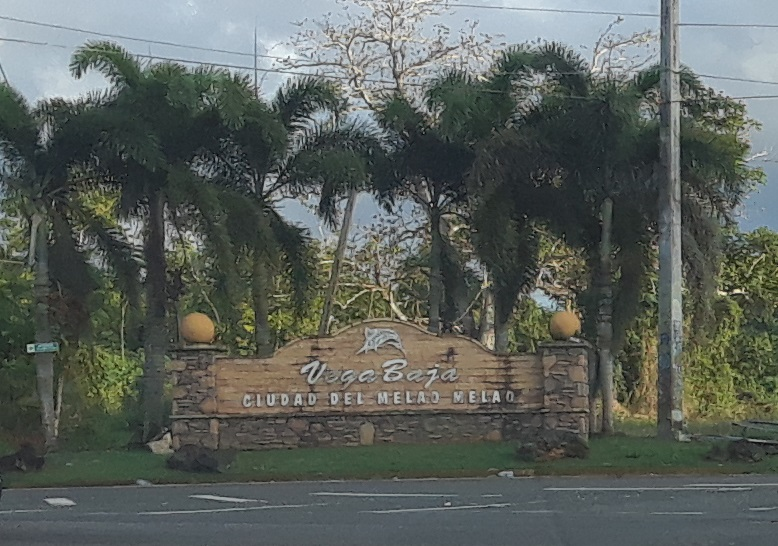
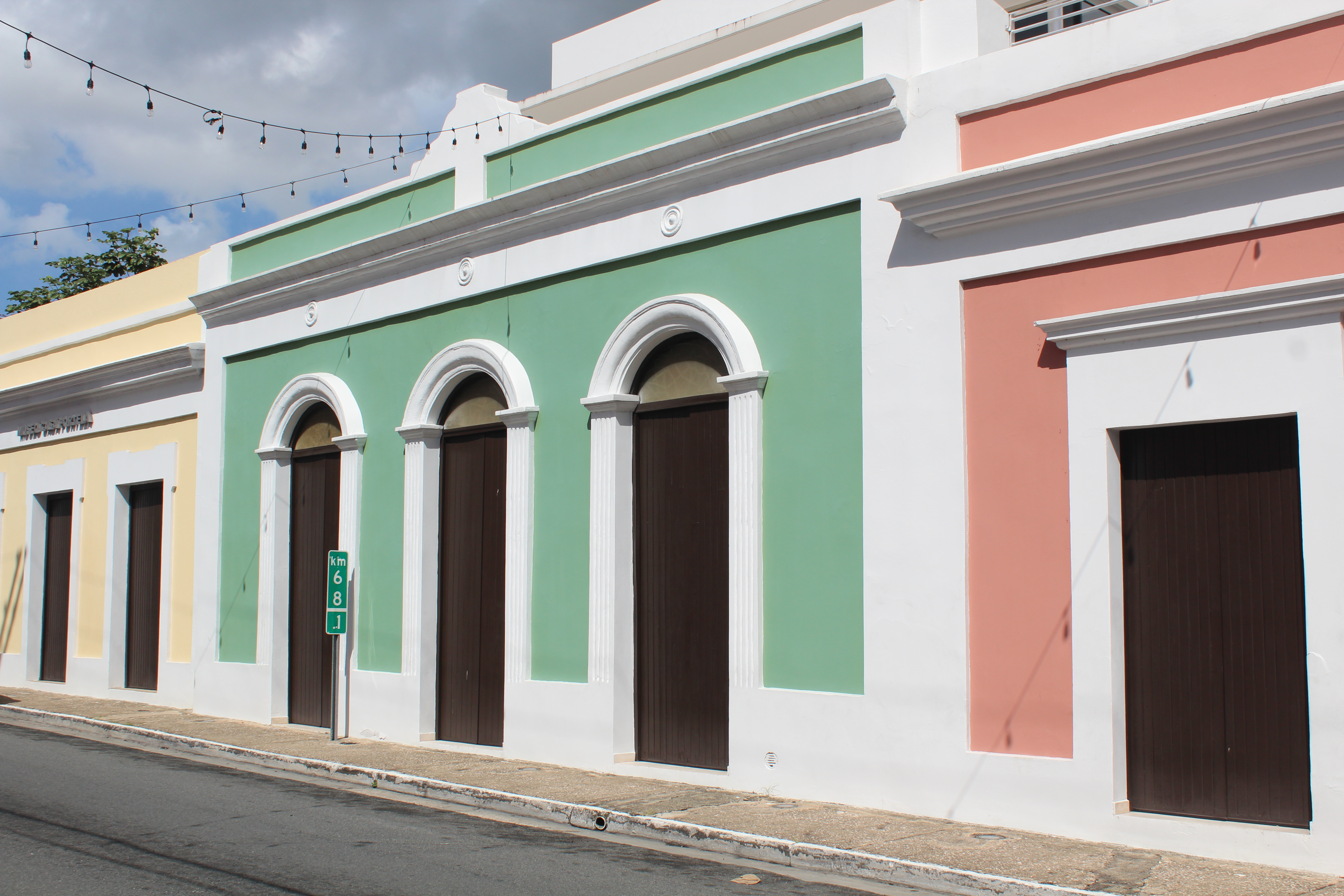
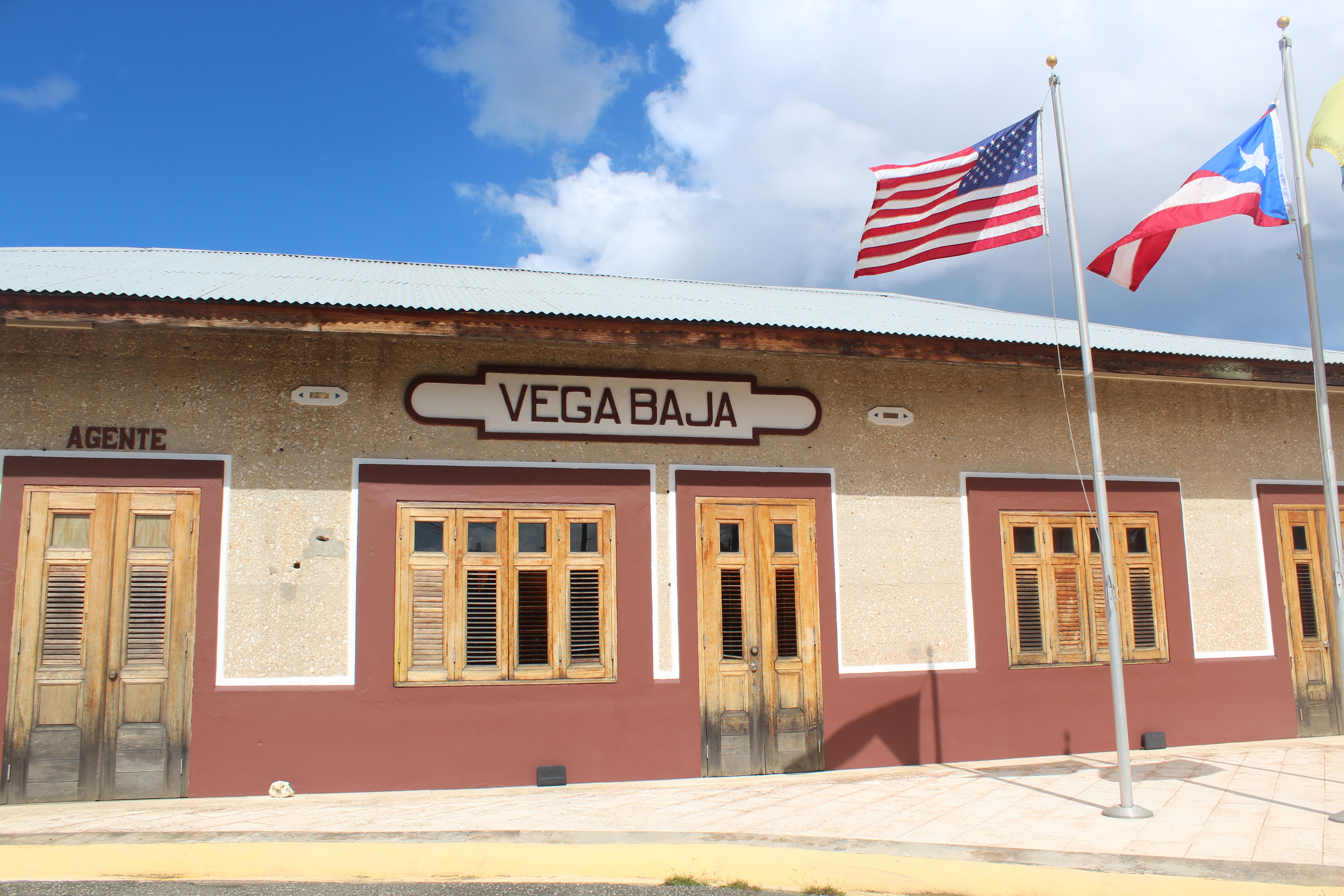
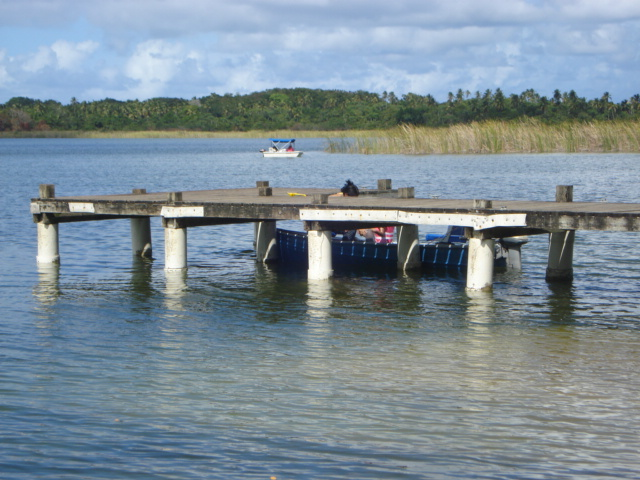
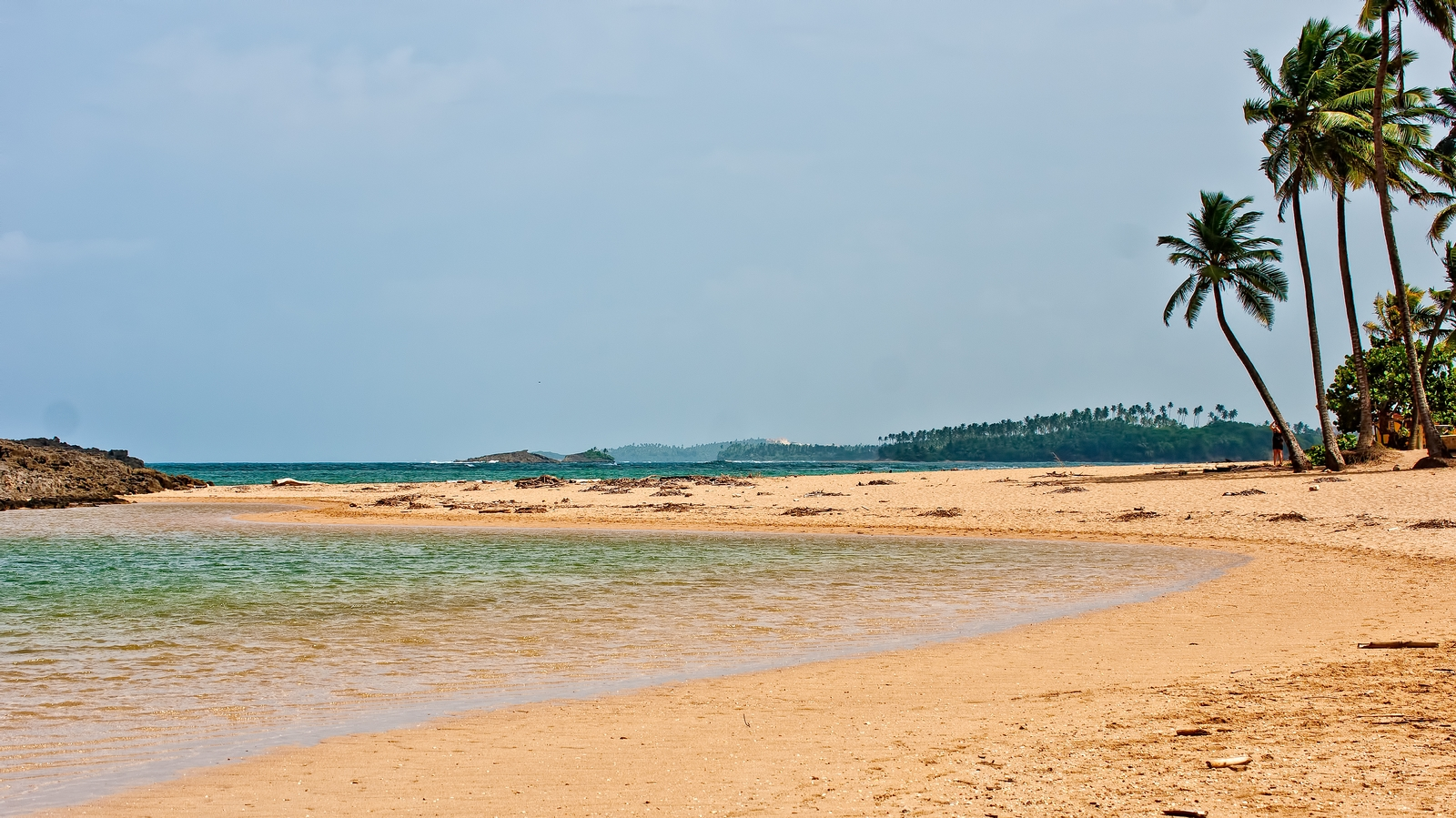
- Church of the Rosary "Ciudad del Melao Melao" town sign Casa Portela Old train station Tortuguero Lagoon Puerto Nuevo Beach

- Flag Coat of arms
- Nickname: "Ciudad del Melao Melao"
- Anthem: "A Vega Baja"
- Map of Puerto Rico highlighting Vega Baja Municipality
- Coordinates: 18°26′46″N 66°23′15″W
- Sovereign state: United States
- Commonwealth: Puerto Rico
- Founded: October 7, 1776
- Barrios: 14 barrios: Algarrobo; Almirante Norte; Almirante Sur; Cabo Caribe; Ceiba; Cibuco; Puerto Nuevo; Pugnado Adentro; Pugnado Afuera; Quebrada Arenas; Río Abajo; Río Arriba; Pueblo; Yeguada

Government
  - Mayor: Marcos Cruz Molina (Partido Popular Democrático)
  - Senatorial dist.: 3 - Arecibo
  - Representative dist.: 12

Area
  - Total: 55.71 sq mi (144.28 km^{2})
  - Land: 47 sq mi (122 km^{2})
  - Water: 8.60 sq mi (22.28 km^{2})

Population (2020)
  - Total: 54,414
  - Estimate (2025): 53,505 ▼
  - Rank: 13th in Puerto Rico
  - Density: 1,160/sq mi (446/km^{2})
- Demonym: Vegabajeños
- Time zone: UTC-4 (AST)
- ZIP Codes: 00693, 00694
- Area code: 787/939
- Website: www.vegabaja.gov.pr

Vega Baja (Spanish pronunciation: [ˈbeɣa ˈβaxa]) is a town and municipality located on the coast of north central Puerto Rico. It is north of Morovis, east of Manatí, and west of Vega Alta. Vega Baja is spread over 14 barrios. The population of the municipality was 54,414 at the 2020 census. It is part of the San Juan–Caguas–Guaynabo metropolitan statistical area.

== Etymology ==
The name Vega Baja in Spanish means 'lower valley' (Vega Alta meaning 'upper valley'). Historians believe that the name Vega Baja comes from La Vega. Vega is a surname of one of the families involved in the foundation of Vega Baja. It is also believed that the name comes from the region of Spain La Vega Baja del Segura. Additionally, in Caribbean Spanish, a vega is also a tobacco plantation.

== History ==
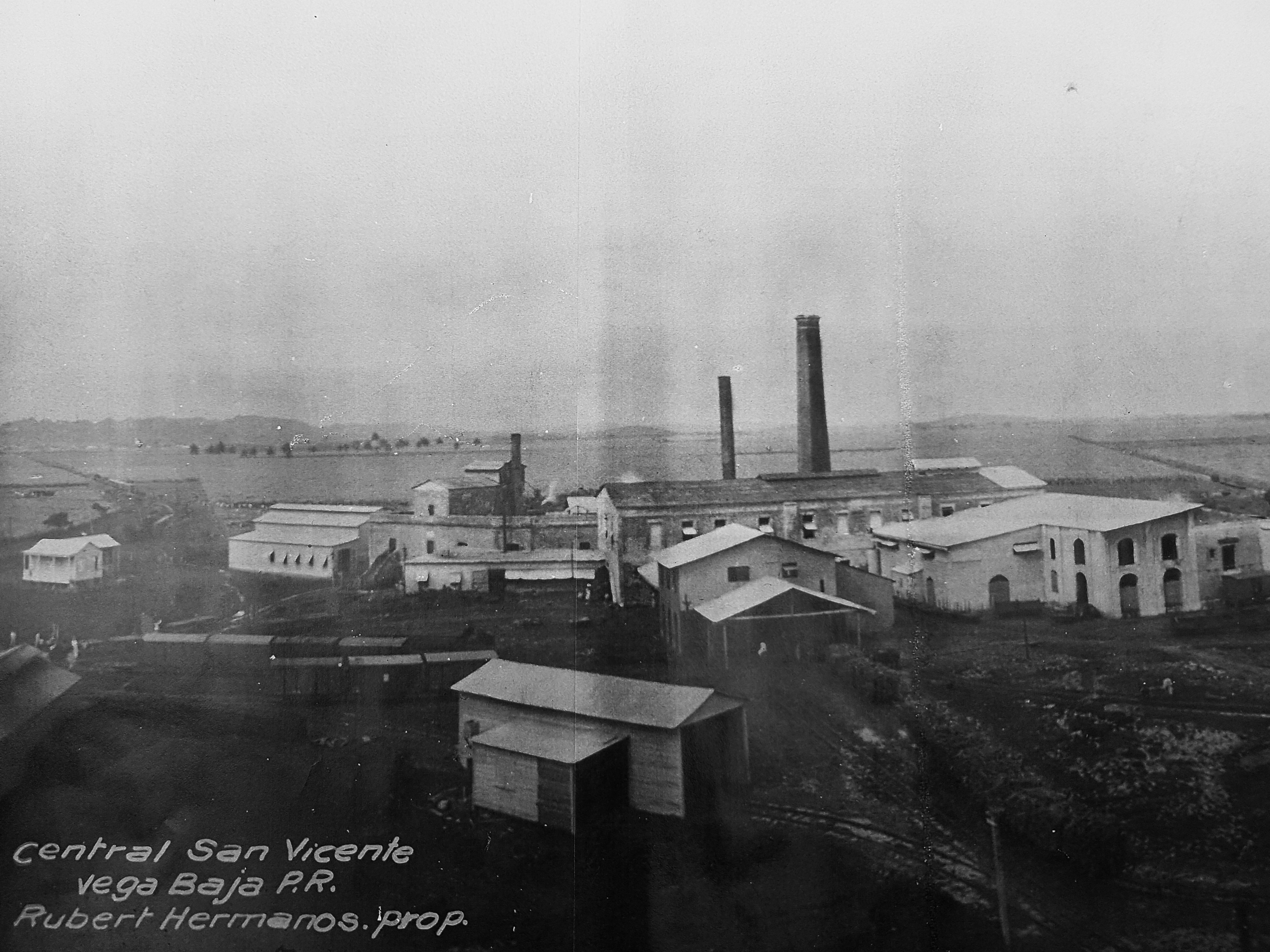
Central San Vicente in 1897

Evidence of indigenous settlement in Vega Baja date to as far as 2580 BCE. At the time of the Spanish arrival to Puerto Rico during the 16th century, local tribes in the area were led by Sebuco, a cacique or Taíno chief of the region after whom the Cibuco River is named. These small tribes of Taínos were known to settle in the vicinity of the rivers, particularly the Indio and Cibuco River, which although prone to seasonal floods, benefit the agricultural activities of the inhabitants. Taino rock carvings have been found on some of the exposed reefs in the vicinity of the Cibuco River. Among these carvings is one depicting a face and others shaped as fish. They are an indication that these reefs were frequented for spear fishing and perhaps other day-to-day activities. Other places like Carmelita, Maisabel, Cueva Maldita and Paso del Indio are known as archaeological sites where the aborigines established their communities.

Both Vega Baja and neighboring Vega Alta trace their origins to La Vega (also documented as Las Vegas) a short-lived town which gained administrative independence from Manatí in 1760. La Vega was dissolved in 1775, marking the municipal independence of the towns of Vega Alta and Vega Baja, which were former barrios of this town. The establishment of Vega Baja was officially recognized by the Spanish government in October 7, 1776, the feast day of the Virgin of the Rosary. Vega Baja was originally known as Vega-baxa del Naranjal de Nuestra Señora del Rosario (Vega Baja of the Orange Grove of Our Lady of the Rosary).

Vega Baja grew as a regional agricultural center in the 19th century, with its numerous rich crops, particularly orange crops, being described by Spanish documents in 1813. The area was the setting for several slave revolts, particularly in 1848. Central San Vicente, the first modern sugarcane refinery in Puerto Rico, was established in Vega Baja in 1873 by Leonardo Igaravidez. It remained operational until 1967.

=== Hurricane Maria ===
On September 20, 2017 Hurricane Maria struck the island of Puerto Rico. With an area of about 121.4 square kilometres (46.9 sq mi) Vega Baja is a municipality on the north coast with some barrios on the coast and others in more mountainous areas. With an estimated population of 53,674 (2016, Census estimates) when Hurricane Maria struck, 48.5% were below poverty and 21.8% were people over the age of 60. The hurricane triggered numerous landslides in the municipality.

Rivers were breached causing flooding of low-lying areas, and infrastructure including homes were destroyed. A tributary of the Cibuco River rose immediately putting 100 people's lives at risk. Many of those residents took refuge on roofs or sought out small boats to navigate the flooded waters and to help remove people who were trapped on roofs or inside residences. Then municipal staff picked people up in buses and took them to the shelter at the Lino Padrón School, where the electric generator nor school cistern worked. Telecommunications systems were destroyed causing state and municipal rescue officers to have to rely on radio communication signals, which were limited to a radius of a few miles. Radio signals did not reach Vega Baja and news, such as the fact that a curfew had been declared, only spread by word of mouth. The mayor, who lost his home, said the storm surge and hurricane winds destroyed most of the structures in Cerro Gordo, a coastal sector. The urban, downtown areas were impassable due to the large number of downed trees and power lines. The Cibuco River rose above PR-2 highway, preventing the passage to the adjoining municipality of Vega Alta and heading west, a stretch could be covered with extreme difficulty, until it was also blocked with the rising of the Río Grande de Manatí. The mayor stated, “We don't know what happened on the mountain. We have not been able to get there yet,” and “The destruction is so great. I don't know how to explain seeing the despair of a mother or an elderly person right now. It is not easy what we are living.”

== Geography ==
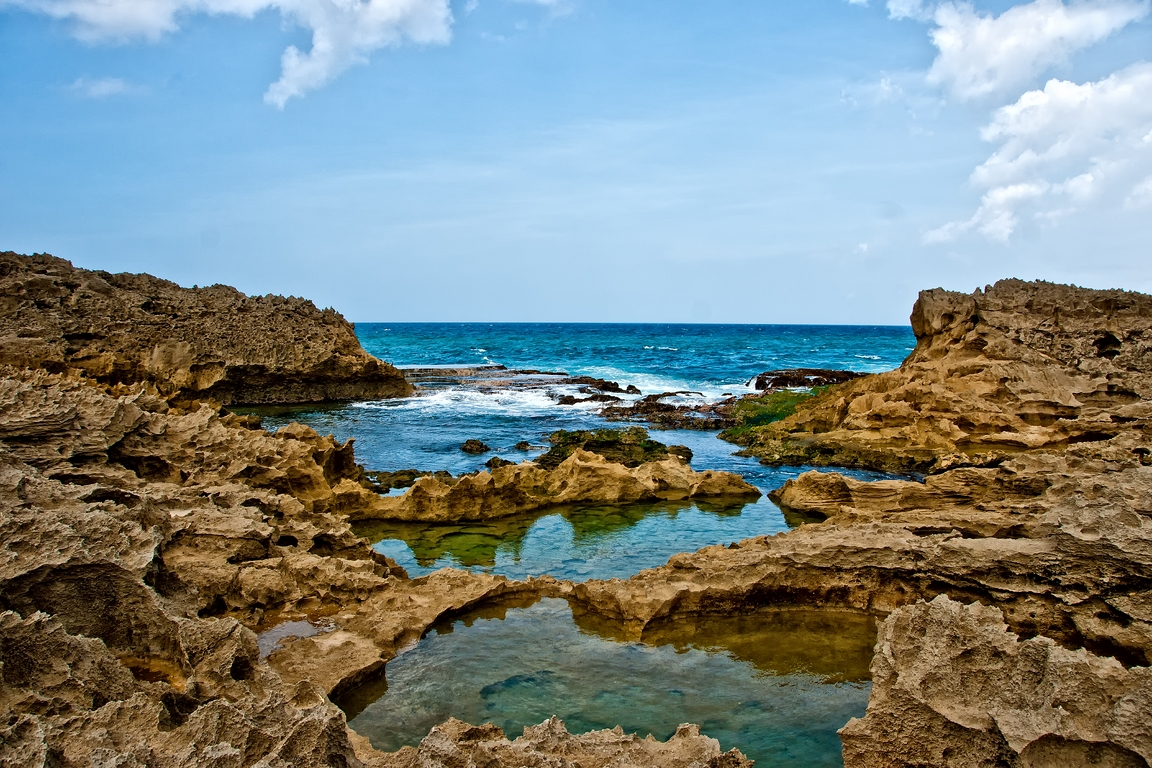
Tidepools on a beach in Vega Baja

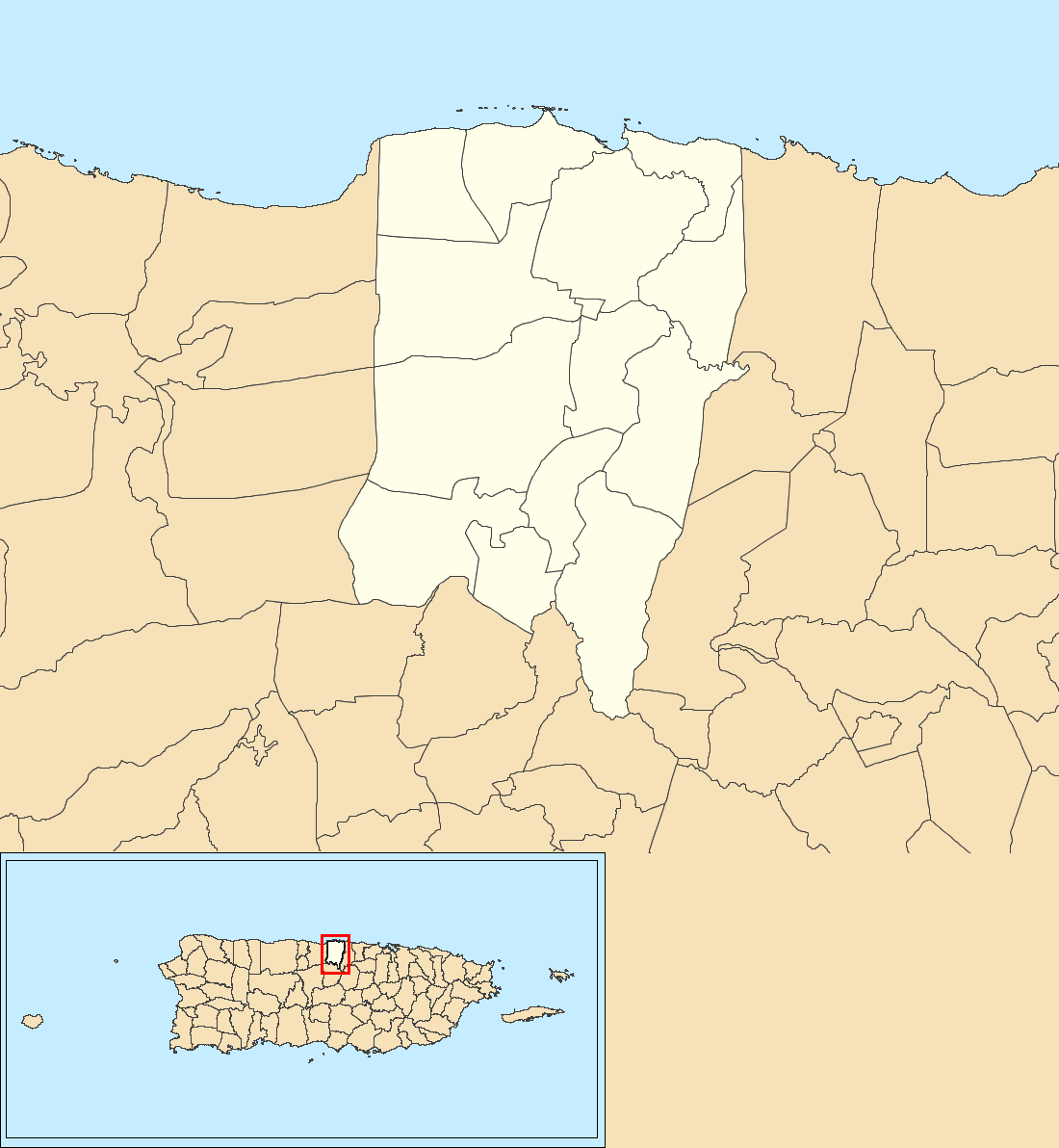
Barrios of Vega Baja

Vega Baja is located on the northern coast. The municipality is located along the Northern Karst region of Puerto Rico, and the town is located on the Northern Plains. The highest point in the municipality is Cerro Barajona (905.2 ft. / 276 m), a mogote located close to the municipal boundary with Morovis.

=== Barrios ===
Like all municipalities of Puerto Rico, Vega Baja is subdivided into barrios. The municipal buildings, central square and large Catholic church are located in a barrio called "Pueblo" (barrio-pueblo on the US Census). Note: While the US Census and the PR GIS data, indicate there are 14 barrios in Vega Baja, the Vega Baja government page seems to exclude Vega Baja barrio-pueblo in its list of barrios.

1. Algarrobo
2. Almirante Norte
3. Almirante Sur
4. Cabo Caribe
5. Ceiba
6. Cibuco
7. Puerto Nuevo
8. Pugnado Adentro
9. Pugnado Afuera
10. Quebrada Arenas
11. Río Abajo
12. Río Arriba
13. Pueblo
14. Yeguada

=== Sectors ===
Barrios (which are, in contemporary times, roughly comparable to minor civil divisions) and subbarrios, are further subdivided into smaller areas called sectores (sectors in English). The types of sectores may vary, from normally sector to urbanización to reparto to barriada to residencial, among others.

=== Special Communities ===
Comunidades Especiales de Puerto Rico (Special Communities of Puerto Rico) are marginalized communities whose citizens are experiencing a certain amount of social exclusion. A map shows these communities occur in nearly every municipality of the commonwealth. Of the 742 places that were on the list in 2014, the following barrios, communities, sectors, or neighborhoods were in Vega Baja: Alto de Cuba, Callejón Pérez and Sector El Hoyo in Barrio Algarrobo, Guarico Viejo, and La Trocha-Río Abajo.

== Demographics ==
Historical population
Census	Pop.	Note	%±
1900	10,305		—
1910	12,831		24.5%
1920	15,756		22.8%
1930	20,406		29.5%
1940	23,105		13.2%
1950	28,925		25.2%
1960	30,189		4.4%
1970	35,327		17.0%
1980	47,115		33.4%
1990	55,997		18.9%
2000	61,929		10.6%
2010	59,662		−3.7%
2020	54,414		−8.8%
2025 (est.)	53,505	▼	−1.7%
U.S. Decennial Census; 1899 (shown as 1900) 1910-1930; 1930-1950 1960-2000 2010 2020

Puerto Rico was ceded by Spain in the aftermath of the Spanish–American War under the terms of the Treaty of Paris of 1898 and became a territory of the United States. In 1899, the United States conducted its first census of Puerto Rico finding that the population of Vega Baja was 10,305.

=== Crime ===
Drug trafficking has been an issue in Vega Baja for many years and in early 1990, $43 million in cash was found buried in plastic barrels, thought to have been deposited by drug smugglers for later retrieval. The sudden wealth of a few Vega Baja residents attracted attention and prompted an investigation by FBI and local police. By May 1990, the FBI had traced $11 million and seized and confiscated property and goods purchased with the money thought to belong to drug lord Ramon Torres Gonzalez.

Vega Baja - 2020 census
Race	Population	%
White alone	10,042	18.5
Black or Afro-Puerto Rican	3,491	6.4
American Indian/Alaska Native	460	0.8
Asian alone	28	0.1
Native Hawaiian and other Pacific Islander alone	9	0.0
Some other race alone	13,783	25.3
Two or More Races alone	26,601	48.9

== Tourism ==
=== Landmarks and places of interest ===
There are 14 beaches in Vega Baja. Some main attractions of Vega Baja include:

- Casa Alcaldía (the historic city hall)
- Casa Alonso Museum
- Casa Portela Museum
- Cibuco Swamp
- El Trece Recreational Area
- Vega Baja House of Culture and Tourism
- Man of the Sugar Cane Monument
- Melao Melao Artisan Center
- Migrants Square
- Museo del Salon de la Fama del Deporte Vega Baja Melao Melao
- Puerto Nuevo Beach and its recreational area
- José Francisco Náter Square (main town square or plaza)
- Teatro América
- Teatro Fénix
- Tortuguero Lagoon
  - Laguna Tortuguero Nature Reserve and its recreational area
- Trinitarias Park

== Economy ==
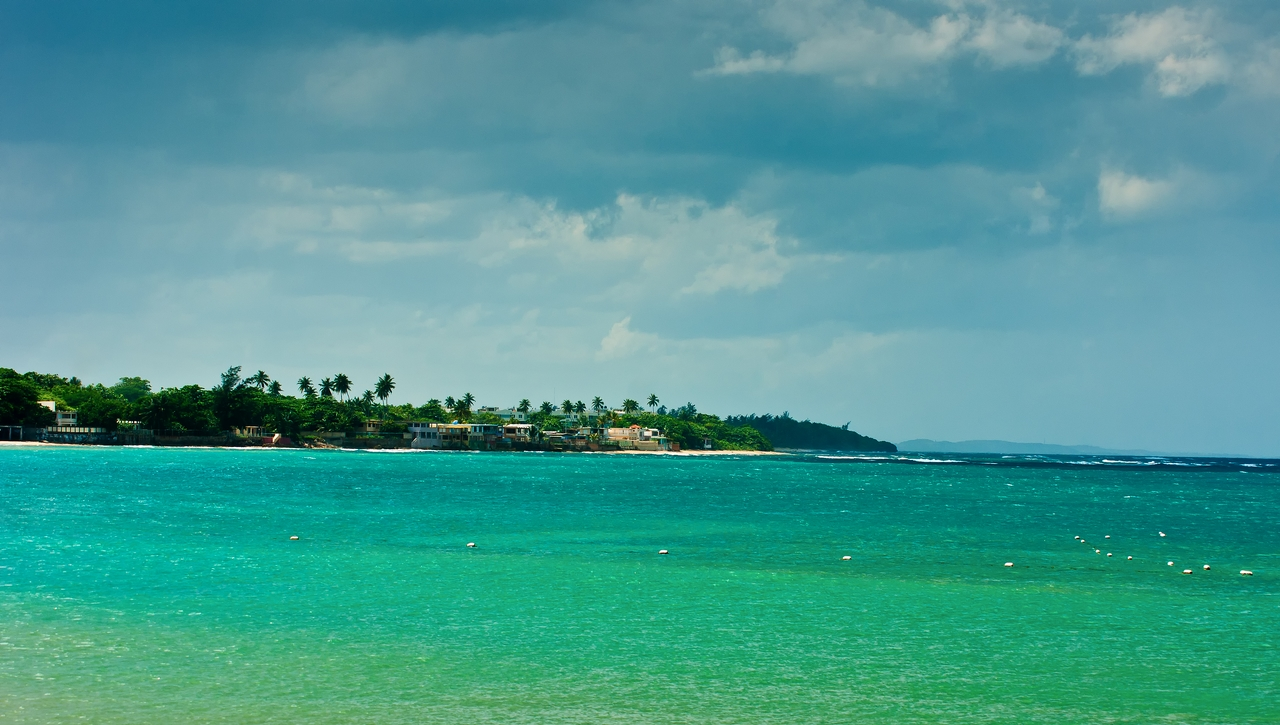
Playa Mar Bella (aka Playa de Puerto Nuevo), Puerto Nuevo, Vega Baja

The abundant fertility of its soil has meant Vega Baja has much agricultural and farming land. In addition, Vega Baja has one of the most visited beaches of the northern coastline, Puerto Nuevo Beach (officially Mar Bella Beach). This beach attracts thousands of beachgoers annually, making it a center for local tourism, especially during the hot summer months. It boasts a natural rock formation of enormous proportions both in height and length colloquially named La Peña. This rock feature shelters the beach portion from the open seas just behind it. During rough marine conditions, the rock feature protects beachgoers, while the spectacle of waves crashing from behind and cascading down its face can be appreciated in the relative safety of the beach.

=== Agriculture ===
- Pineapple, cattle feed (hay). In decades past, the land portion situated between the neighborhood of Monte Carlo and the neighborhood of Los Naranjos, was the site for the cultivation of sugar cane.
- Dairy farming

=== Industry ===
- Clothing, leather articles; electrical and electronic equipment, machinery
- Medical, and pharmaceutical.

== Culture ==
=== Festivals and events ===
Vega Baja celebrates its patron saint festival in October. The Fiestas Patronales de Nuestra Virgen del Rosario is a religious and cultural celebration that generally features parades, games, artisans, amusement rides, regional food, and live entertainment.

Other festivals and events celebrated in Vega Baja include:

- Three Kings Festival – January
- Triathlon – March
- Annual Tournament of Champions – June
- San Juan Night – June
- Virgen del Carmen Festival – July
- Beach Festival at Mar Bella - July
- Socio-Cultural Fair – May
- Melao Melao Festival – October
- Christmas Festival – December

== Government ==
All municipalities in Puerto Rico are administered by a mayor, elected every four years. The current mayor of Vega Baja is Marcos Cruz Molina, of the Popular Democratic Party (PPD). He was first elected at the 2012 general elections.

The city belongs to the Puerto Rico Senatorial district III, which is represented by two senators. In 2024, Brenda Pérez Soto and Gabriel González were elected as District Senators.

== Transportation ==
There are 23 bridges in Vega Baja.

== Notable people ==
- Carmen Rivera de Alvarado – social worker, educator and independence activist
- Bad Bunny – Platinum rapper, singer, record producer, actor, and professional wrestler
- Juan Gonzalez – Two time AL MVP, 3 time Allstar, Multiple time AL HR leader, Home run derby winner, MLB RBI leader and in 1998 he was owner of the second most RBIs by all star break ever (101). He played mostly for the Texas Rangers.
- Ivan Rodriguez – a.k.a. “Pudge” was widely considered the best catcher of his generation, MLB AL MVP, perennial all star and gold glover. Hall of Fame baseball player who played mostly for the Texas Rangers
- Damian Priest - born as Luis Martínez, one-time World Heavyweight Champion of the World Wrestling Entertainment
- Roberto Sierra – Distinguished classical composer, student of György Ligeti, laureate of the es:Premio Tomás Luis de Victoria (2017) and Latin Grammy Award for Best Classical Contemporary Composition (2021), member of the American Academy of Arts and Sciences
- Chicky Starr – Professional wrestler and manager in the World Wrestling Council (WWC) and the International Wrestling Association (IWA)

== Symbols ==
The municipio has an official flag and coat of arms.

=== Flag ===
Vega Baja's flag consists of a yellow cloth crossed by a green band. The band relates to the fertile valley and the river.

=== Coat of arms ===
The Vega Baja coat of arms has a v-shaped green band with overlapping roses in silver and three oranges trees, with gold fruit. At the top part is a five-tower crown, silver, black and green. The main colors of the shield; green and gold are used traditionally in civic, scholastic and sports activities. The crown five tower indicates that the town holds the rank of "Villa" by royal decree.

=== Anthem ===
The anthem of Vega Baja is "A Vega Baja" with lyrics as written in 1974 by Adrián Santos Tirado and music by Roberto Sierra.

== Education ==
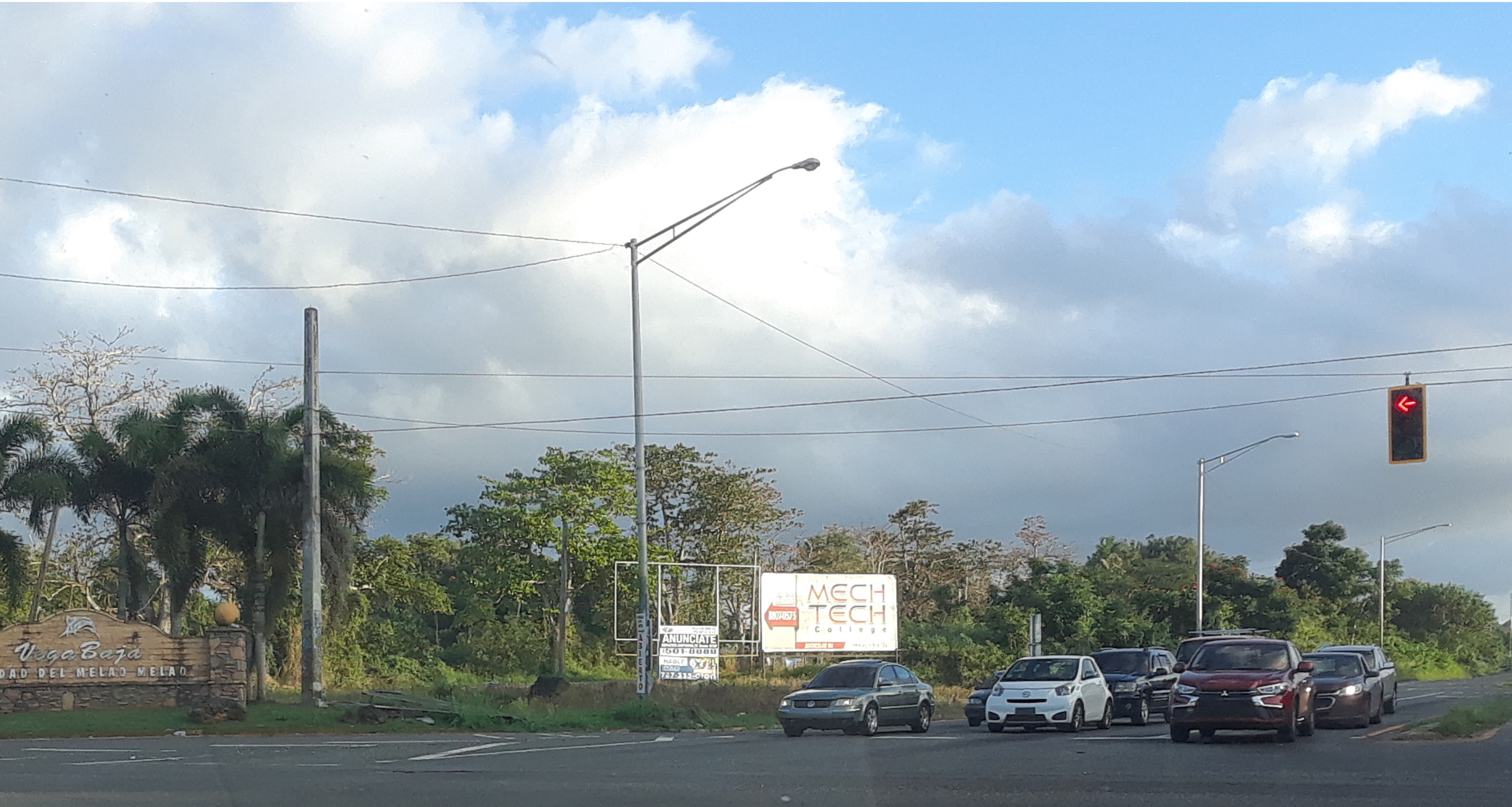
Signs for Mech Tech College in Vega Baja

The following schools are in Vega Baja:

- Agapito Rosario Rosario Grades: K - 5
- Angel Sandin Martinez Grades: 6 - 8
- Centro De Adiestramiento
- Juan Quirindongo Morell (Superior) Grades: 9 - 12
- Lino Padro Rivera Grades: 9 - 12
- Manuel Martinez Davila Grades: K - 8
- Nueva Brigida Alvarez Rodriguez Grades: K - 12
- Rafael Hernandez Grades: K - 5
- San Vicente Grades: K - 5
- Su Almirante Norte Grades: Pre-K - 8

=== Higher education ===
- Caribbean University-Vega Baja Private Not-for-profit 4-year or above

=== Private School ===
- Mech-Tech College

== Gallery ==
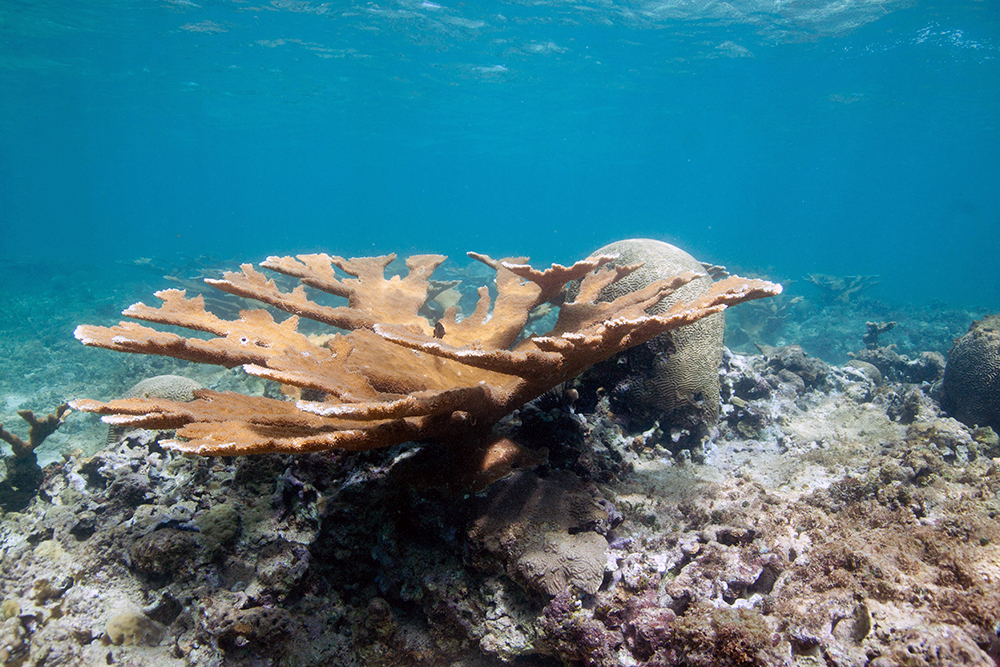
Elkhorn coral near the coast of Vega Baja.

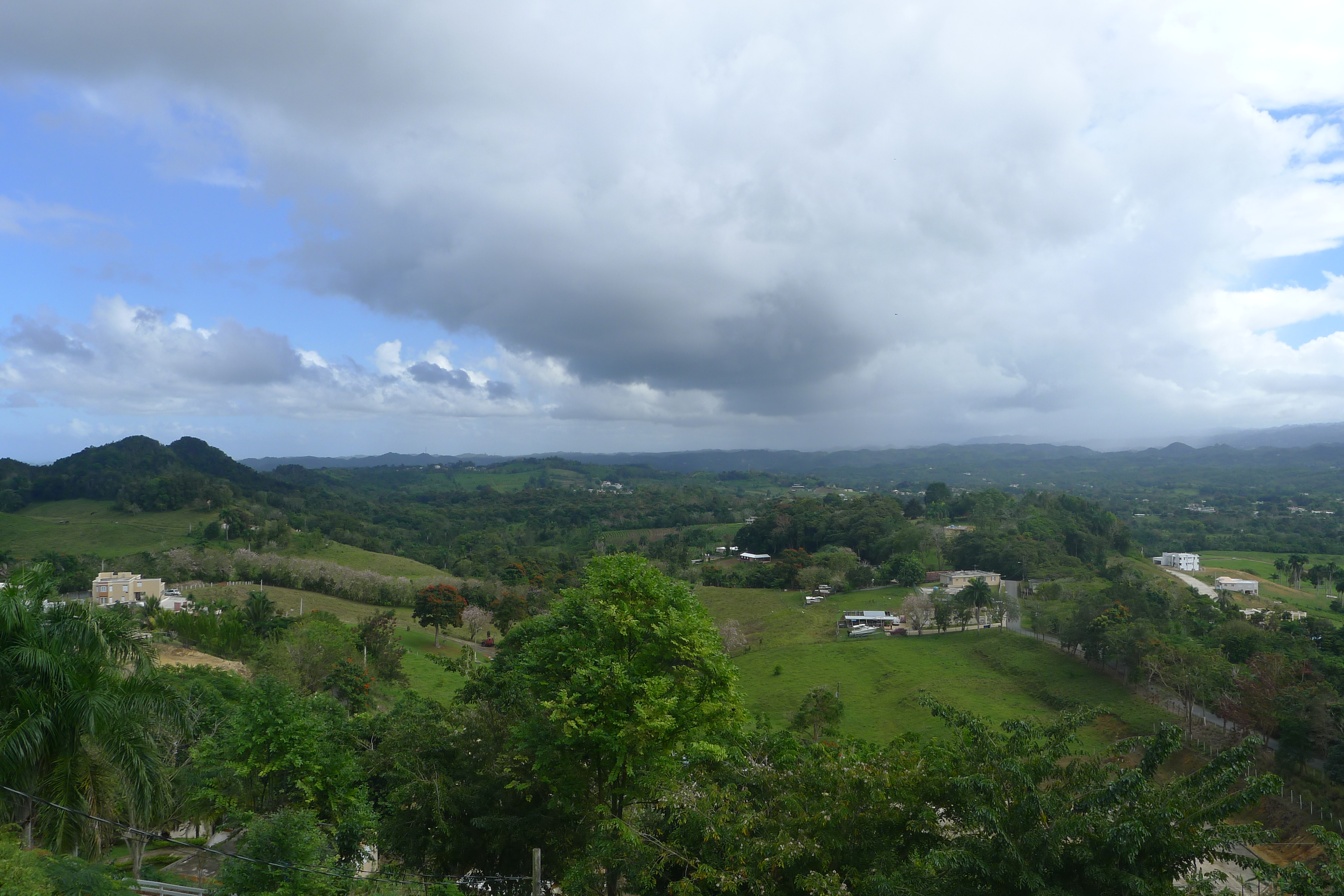
View of Vega Baja in Pugnado Adentro.

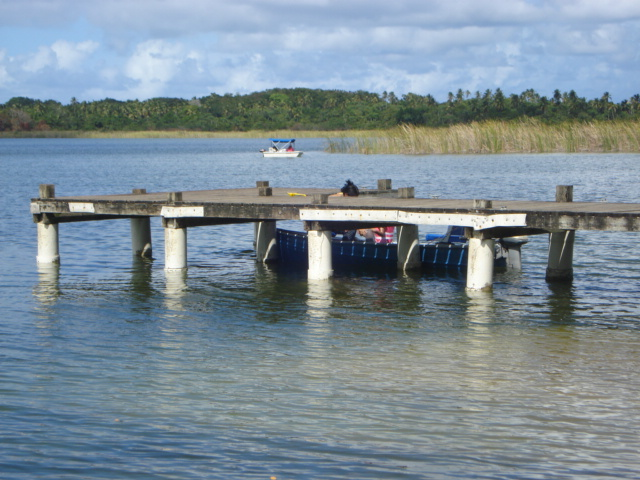
Laguna Tortuguero

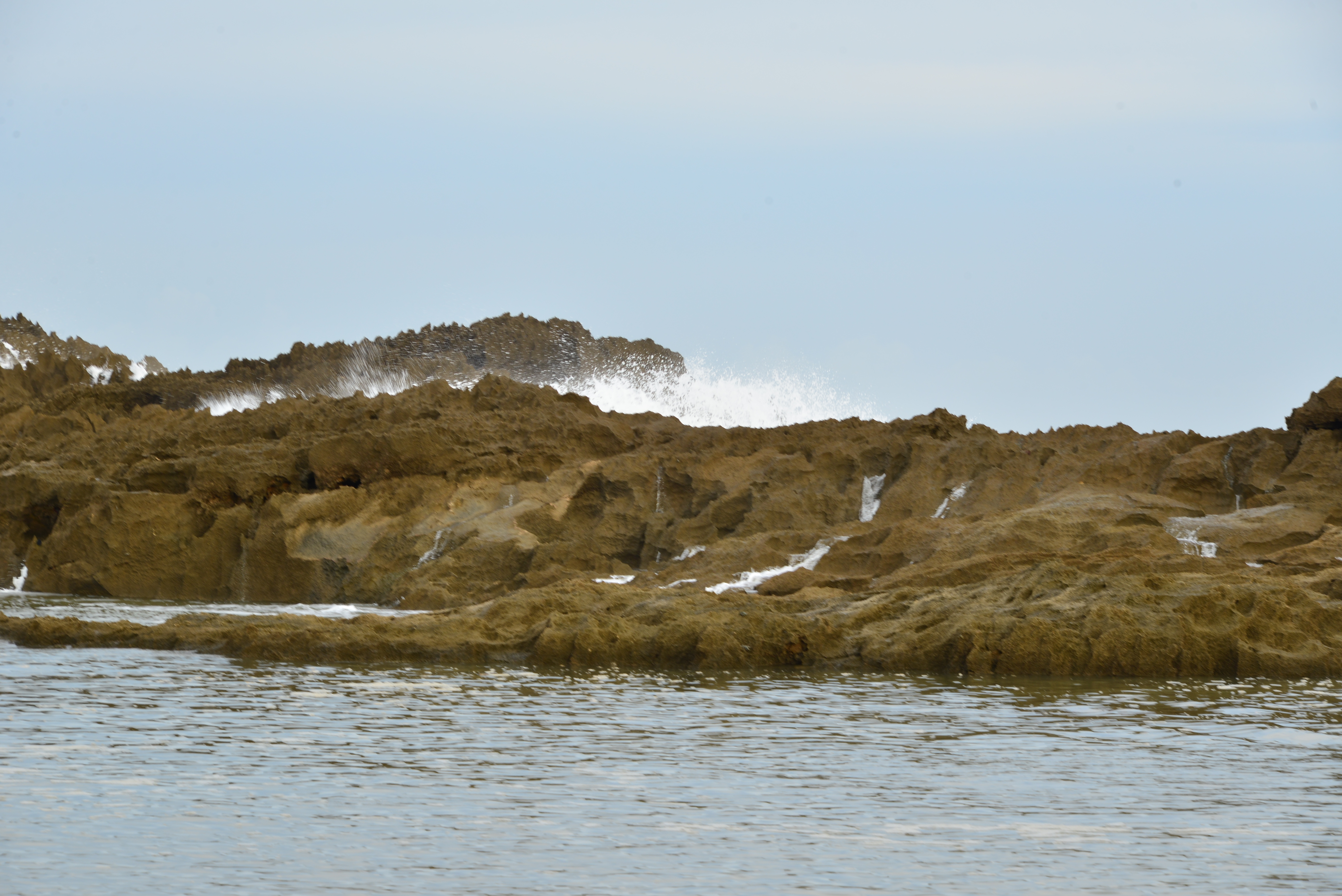
Limestone rock in Mar Bella Beach (Puerto Nuevo Beach).

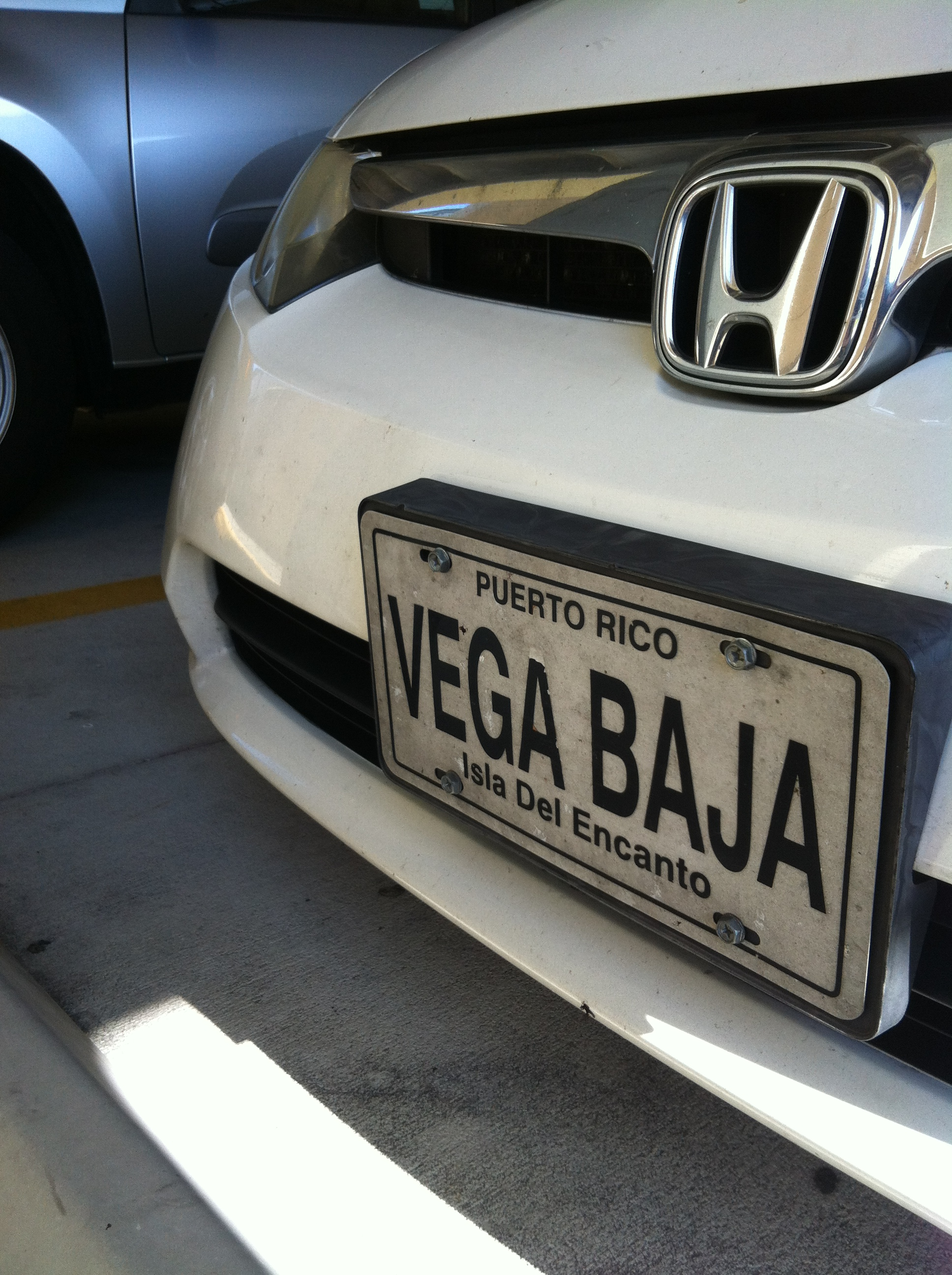
Vega Baja license plate in Altamonte Springs, Florida.

== See also ==
- List of Puerto Ricans
- History of Puerto Rico
- Did you know-Puerto Rico?
