= Alonso =

- Gender: Male

Origin
- Meaning: Noble-ready

Other names
- See also: Alonzo, Alfonso

Alonso is a Spanish name of Germanic origin that is a Castilian variant of Adalfuns. The original Visigothic name Alfonso suffered the phonetic change of the phoneme /f/ into the mute /h/ in the Early Middle Ages (around 9th Century), what eventually suppressed the sound /f/ from the name, deriving in the modern form Alonso. Due to the demographic particularities of the Iberian peninsula during the Middle Ages, this phonetic change was not uniform across the territory and the original form Alfonso also survived in different areas. Therefore, today both forms of the name coexist in Spanish speaking countries.

== Geographical distribution ==
As of 2014, 36.6% of all known bearers of the surname Alonso were residents of Spain (frequency 1:222), 26.1% of Mexico (1:832), 8.3% of Cuba (1:242), 7.0% of Argentina (1:1,061), 4.8% of Brazil (1:7,502), 4.5% of the United States (1:14,083), 2.5% of Colombia (1:3,318), 1.7% of Paraguay (1:736), 1.3% of France (1:9,082) and 1.1% of Uruguay (1:549).

In Spain, the frequency of the surname was higher than average (1:222) in the following regions:

1. Asturias (1:69)
2. Castile and León (1:73)
3. Cantabria (1:96)
4. Galicia (1:125)
5. Basque Country (1:145)
6. La Rioja (1:149)
7. Canary Islands (1:159)
8. Community of Madrid (1:171)

== First name ==
- Alonso (footballer) (Alonso Ferreira de Matos) (born 1980), Brazilian footballer
- Alonso Álvarez de Pineda (1494–1520), Spanish explorer and cartographer
- Alonso de Ercilla (1533–1594), Spanish soldier and poet
- Alonso de Ojeda (1466–1515), Spanish explorer, governor and conquistador
- Alonso de Solís, Spanish explorer and governor of Florida in 1576
- Alonso del Castillo Maldonado, Spanish explorer of the 16th century
- Alonso Fernández Álvarez (born 1982), Costa Rican male model
- Alonso Fernández de Lugo (1450s–1525), Spanish conquistador
- Alonso López (disambiguation), several people
- Alonso Manrique de Lara (1476–1538), Spanish cardinal
- Alonso Mudarra (1510–1580), Spanish composer and vihuelist
- Alonso Pérez (fl. 1881–1914), Spanish painter
- Alonso Solís (born 1978), Costa Rican footballer
- Alonzo Wilcox (1810–1878), American politician
- Martín Alonso Pinzón (1441–1493), Spanish navigator
- Alonso Quixano, the fictitious hero of Don Quixote
- Alonso, King of Naples, fictitious character in Shakespeare's The Tempest

== Surname ==
- Agostina Alonso (born 1995), Argentine field hockey player
- Alejandro Alonso (musician) (1952–2022), Latin-American musician
- Alejandro Alonso (footballer) (born 1982), Argentine football player
- Alfredo Alonso, Cuban media executive
- Alicia Alonso (1920–2019), Cuban ballerina and choreographer
- América Alonso (1936–2022), Venezuelan actress
- Ana Garbín Alonso (1915–1977), Spanish anarchist militiawoman
- LaSirena69 (Antonella Alonso) (born 1990), Venezuelan pornographic actress
- Armando Alonso (born 1984), Costa Rican footballer
- Axel Alonso, American comic book creator best known as the former editor-in-chief at Marvel Comics
- Braulio Alonso (1916–2010), American educator
- Carlos Alonso (born 1971), Canadian Musician
- Clara Alonso (model) (born 1987), Spanish model
- Constanza Alonso (born 1986), Argentine politician
- Dámaso Alonso (1898–1990), Spanish poet, philologist and literary critic
- David Alonso (born 2006), Colombian motorcycle racer
- Dani Alonso (born 1988), Brazilian politician
- Daniella Alonso (born 1978), American actress
- Diego Alonso (born 1975), Uruguayan footballer
- Edu Alonso (born 1974), Spanish footballer
- Ernesto Alonso (1917–2007), Mexican film director and producer
- Fernando Alonso (born 1981), Spanish racing driver
- Fernando Alonso (dancer) (1914–2013), Cuban ballet dancer
- Francisco Alonso (1887–1948), Spanish composer
- Iván Alonso (born 1979), Uruguayan footballer
- Jessica Alonso Bernardo (born 1983), Spanish handball player
- José Alonso (hurdler) (born 1957), Spanish hurdler
- José Alonso (actor) (born 1947), Mexican actor
- José Alonso (trade unionist) (1917–1970), Argentine trade-unionist
- José María Alonso (1890–1979), Spanish tennis player
- José Antonio Alonso (1960–2017), Spanish Socialist Workers' Party (PSOE) politician
- José Ángel (footballer, born March 1989) (José Ángel Alonso) (born 1989), Spanish footballer
- Juan Alonso (footballer, born 1927) (1927–1994), Spanish footballer
- Julián Alonso (born 1977), Spanish tennis player
- Júnior Alonso (born 1993), Paraguayan football player
- Kiko Alonso (born 1990), American football linebacker
- Laura Alonso (soprano), Spanish operatic soprano
- Laura Alonso (politician), Argentine politician
- Laz Alonso (born 1974), American actor
- Lisandro Alonso (born 1975), Argentine filmmaker
- Lula (footballer, born 1922) (Luís Alonso Pérez) (1922–1972), Brazilian football manager
- Manuel A. Alonso Pacheco (1822–1889), Puerto Rican writer
- Marquitos (footballer, born 1933) (Marcos Alonso Imaz) (1933–2012), Spanish footballer
- Marcos Alonso (footballer, born 1959) (Marcos Alonso Peña) (1959–2023), Spanish footballer
- Marcos Alonso (footballer, born 1990) (Marcos Alonso Mendoza) (born 1990), Spanish footballer
- María Conchita Alonso (born 1957), Cuban singer and actress
- María Rosa Alonso (1909–2011), Spanish professor, philologist, essayist
- Marta García Alonso (born 1998), Spanish middle- and long-distance runner
- Periko Alonso (Miguel Ángel Alonso), Spanish former football midfielder and manager
- Mikel Alonso (born 1980), Spanish footballer
- Mónica Alonso (born 1998), Spanish rhythmic gymnast
- Noel Alonso (born 1987), Spanish footballer
- Norberto Alonso (born 1953), Argentine footballer
- Osvaldo Alonso (born 1985), Cuban footballer
- Pete Alonso (born 1994), American baseball player
- Pichi Alonso (born 1954), Spanish footballer
- Rafael Salazar Alonso (1895–1936), Spanish politician, lawyer, and newspaper mogul, served as mayor of Madrid
- Rosita Alonso (1943–2025), Argentine-Colombian actress
- Tomás N. Alonso (1881–1962), Filipino writer
- Victoria Alonso (born 1965), Argentine film producer
- William Alonso (1933–1999), Argentine-American economist
- Xabi Alonso (born 1981), Spanish footballer
- Yonder Alonso (born 1987), Cuban baseball player

== See also ==
- Alonso (disambiguation)
- Alonzo, a given name and surname
- Alfonso, a male given name
