= Lonzo =

Lonzo is a surname, a male given name, and a shortening of Alonzo. It may refer to:

== Given name ==
- Lonzo Anderson (1905–1993), American children's author
- Lonzo Ball (born 1997), American basketball player
- Lonzo Bullie (born 1947), American football coach
- Lonzo Nzekwe, filmmaker
- Lonzo R. Wilkinson, aka Stalker, a G.I. Joe character

== Nickname ==
- Lloyd "Lonzo" George (1924–1991), part of American country music duo of Lonzo and Oscar

== Surname ==
- Fred Lonzo (born 1950), American jazz trombonist

== See also ==
- Alonzo
- Alonso
