= Alonso (disambiguation) =

Alonso is a surname and male given name.

Alonso or variant, may also refer to:

== Mononymous people ==
- Alonso (footballer) (born 1980 as Alonso Ferreira de Matos), Brazilian soccer player

=== Fictional characters ===
- Alonso (Shakespeare), the King of Naples, a character created by William Shakespeare for The Tempest

== Places ==
- Casa Alonso, Vega Baja Pueblo, Vega Baja, Puerto Rico; a historic building
- Alonso (crater), Miranda, Uranus system, Solar System

== See also ==
- Alonzo (disambiguation)
- Alfonso (disambiguation)
