= Alonzo (disambiguation) =

Alonzo is a given name and surname. Alonzo may also refer to:

- Alonzo (play), a 1773 tragedy by John Home
- Alonzo, Kentucky, an unincorporated community
- Alonzo (rapper), stage name of French rapper Kassim Djae (born 1982)

== See also ==
- Alonso (disambiguation)
