= Casa Portela Museum =

Historic house museum in Vega Baja, Puerto Rico

- Museo Casa Portela
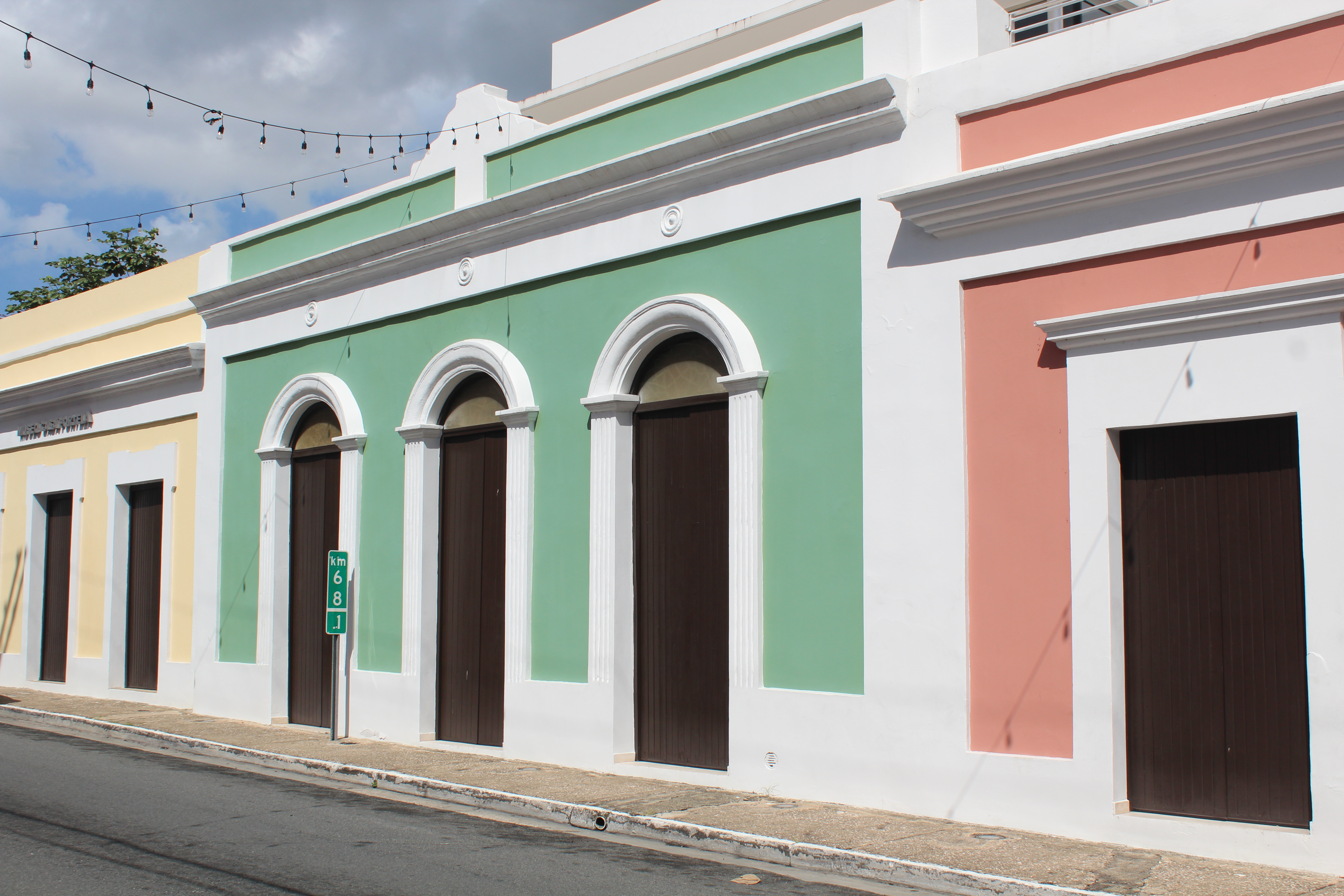
- Casa Portela Museum with sign on the left-most pastel yellow facade on Betances St
- Coordinates: 18.44407°N 66.38574°W

The Casa Portela Museum (Spanish: Museo Casa Portela) is a historic house and local history museum located in Vega Baja Pueblo, the administrative and historic center of the municipality of Vega Baja, Puerto Rico. The museum consists of a historic home locally known as the Portela House (Casa Portela) and an adjacent modern museum building located in a revitalized historic city block bordered by Hostos Street to the east, and the José Julián Acosta and Betances Streets to the north and south, respectively.

In addition to the museum, the building also houses municipal institutions, a history research center and the municipality's sports hall of fame. The museum collections include pieces from the history of the municipality of Vega Baja from the time of its indigenous Taino inhabitants to modern times, general information about the geography and nature of the region, and notable memorabilia and personal belongings of some of the most famous figures from Vega Baja, such as the Trio Vegabajeño.

== History ==
The Portela House dates to at least 1880, but it was not property of the Portela family until 1900 when it was acquired by Ramón Benito Portela Vicente. The house and surrounding block remained abandoned for much of the second half of the 20th century. The museum was established in 1998 when the municipal government acquired abandoned building lots located next to a historic house formally owned by the local Portela family. The modern museum building dates from 2004 and it was designed by architect Ángel Cocero Cordero. The modern building was designed to harmoniously integrate into the historic architecture next to it. The museum officially opened in August 2010.

== Galleries ==
Casa Portela historic structure

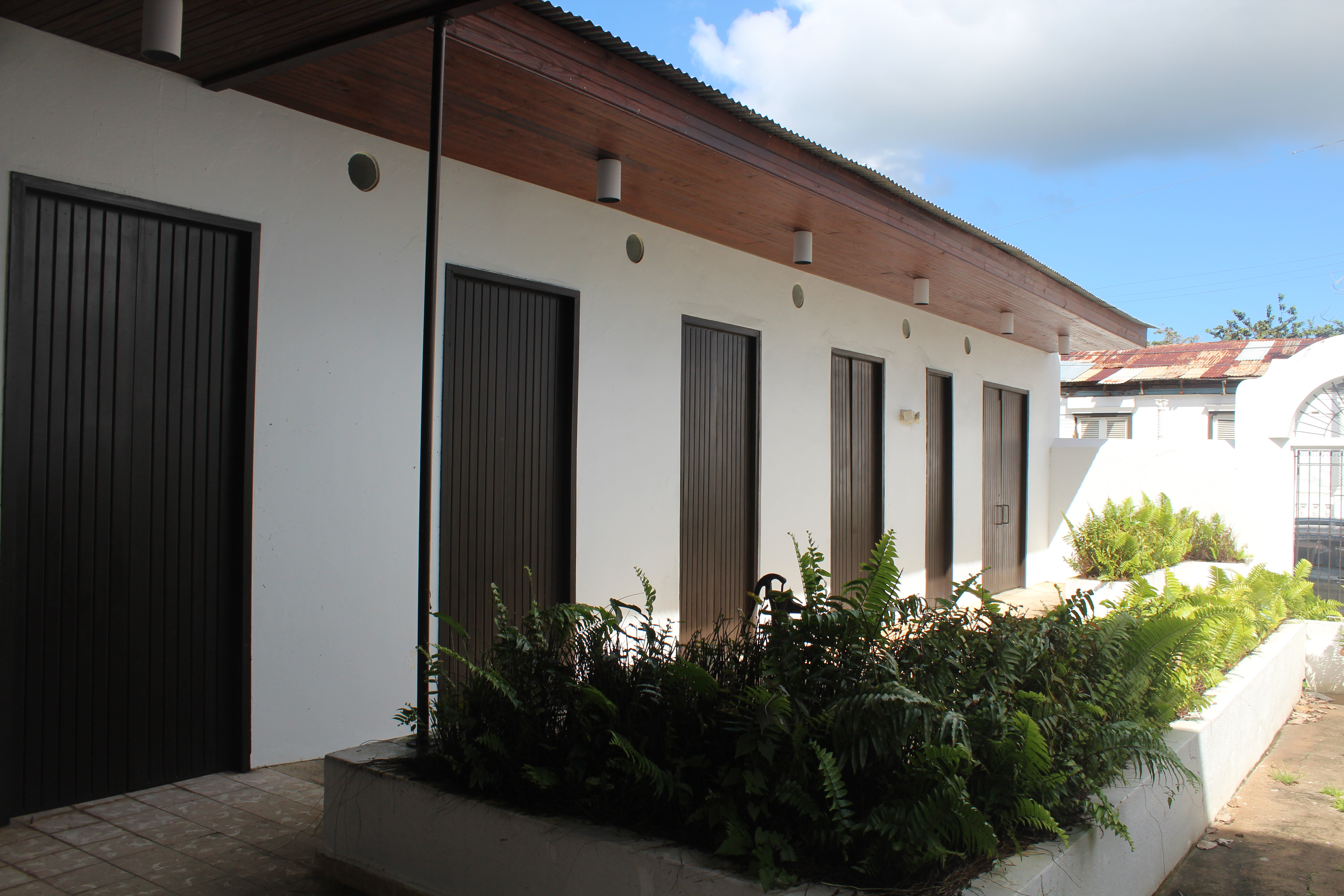
Casa Portela historic courtyard.

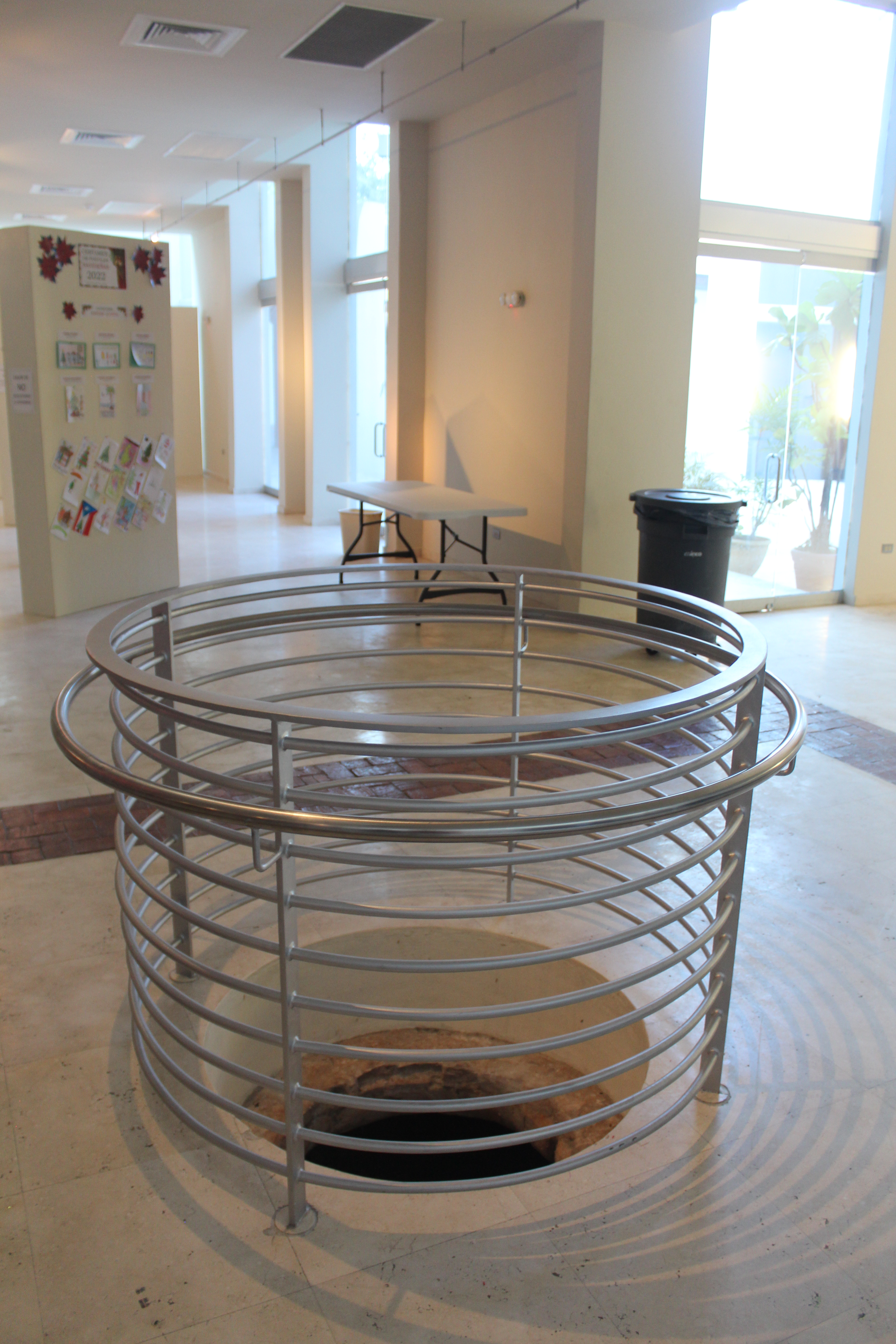
Former water well.

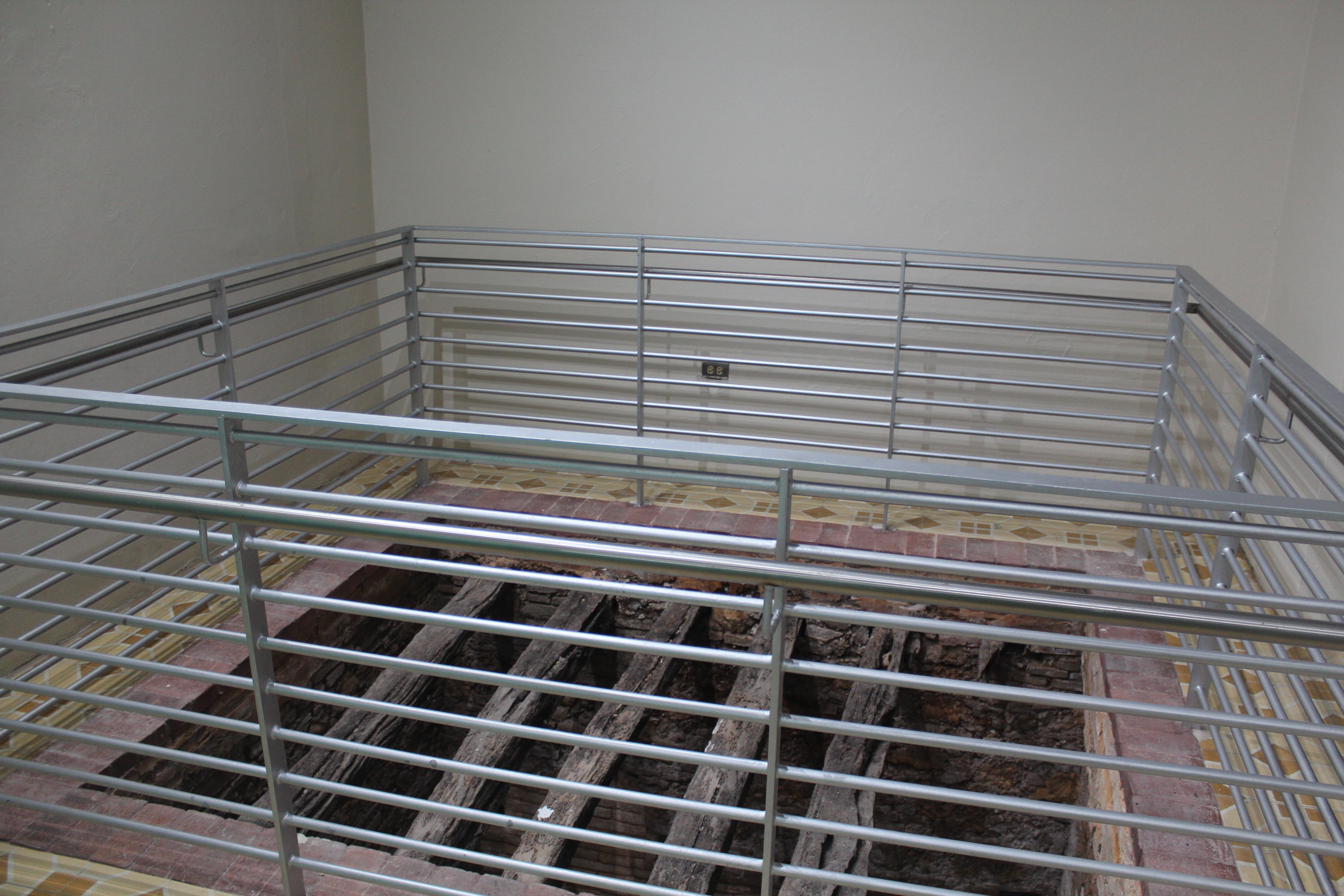
Former wooden structure.

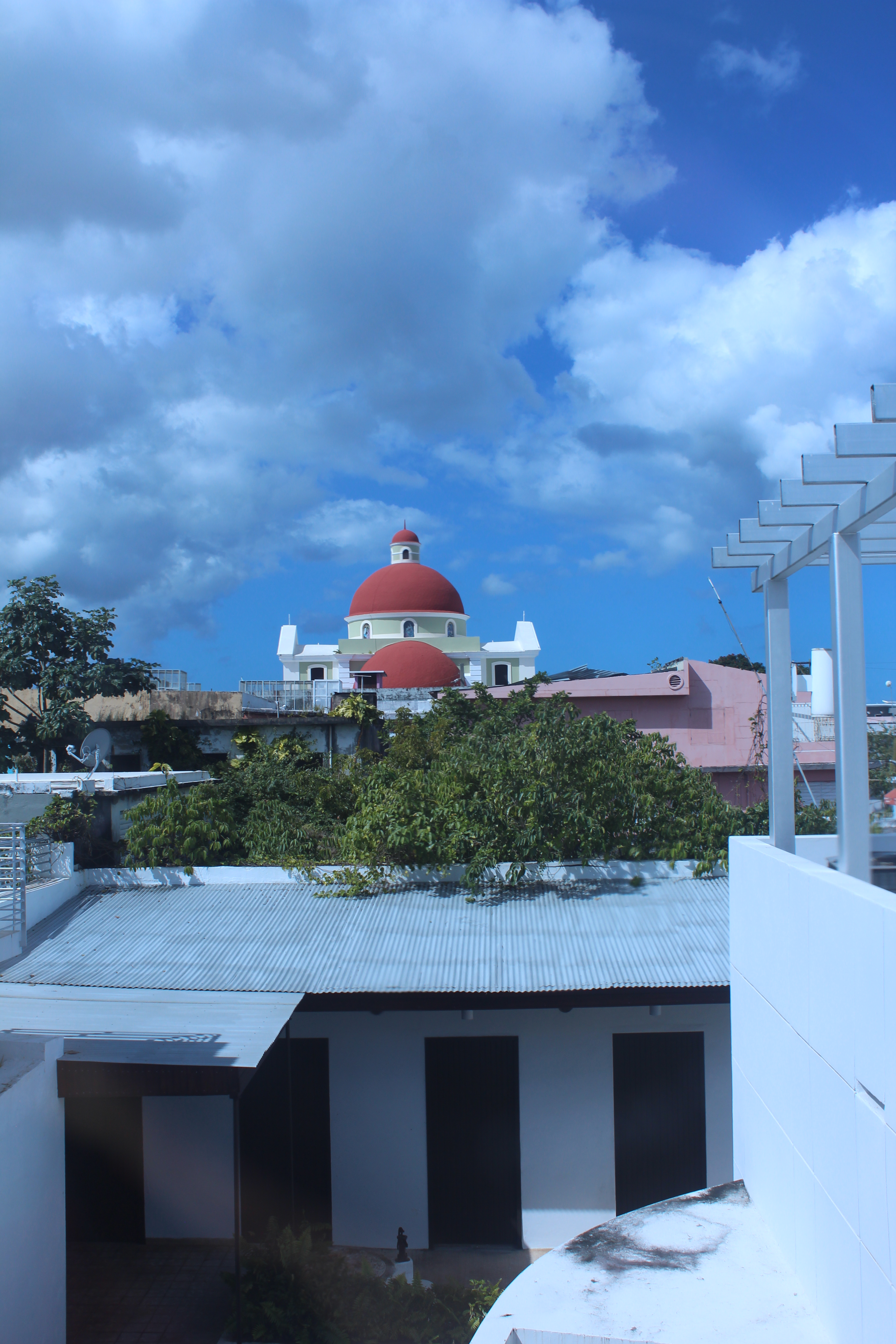
View of the church from the museum.
Collections

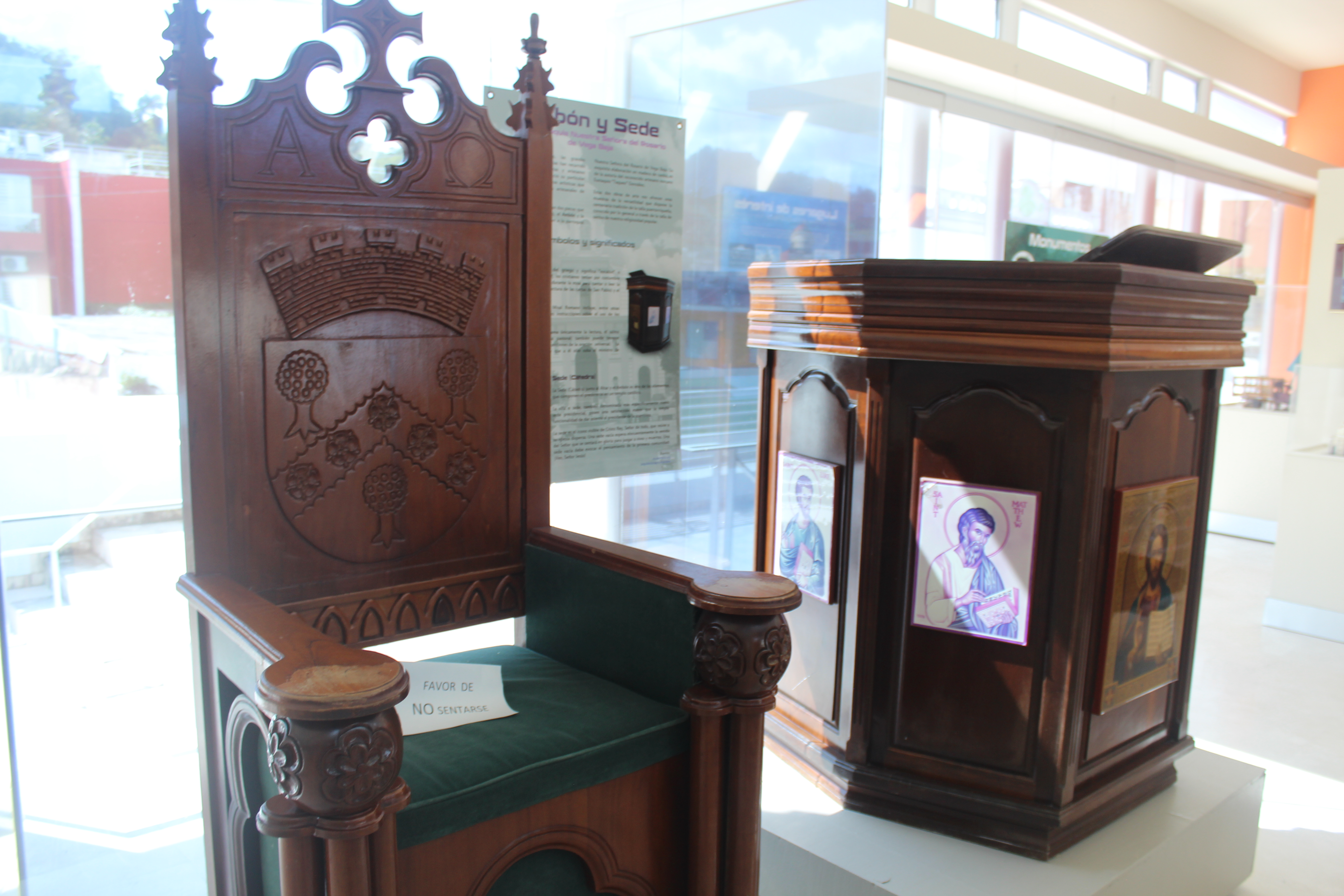
Parish priest sit and pulpit from the Church Santa María del Rosario.

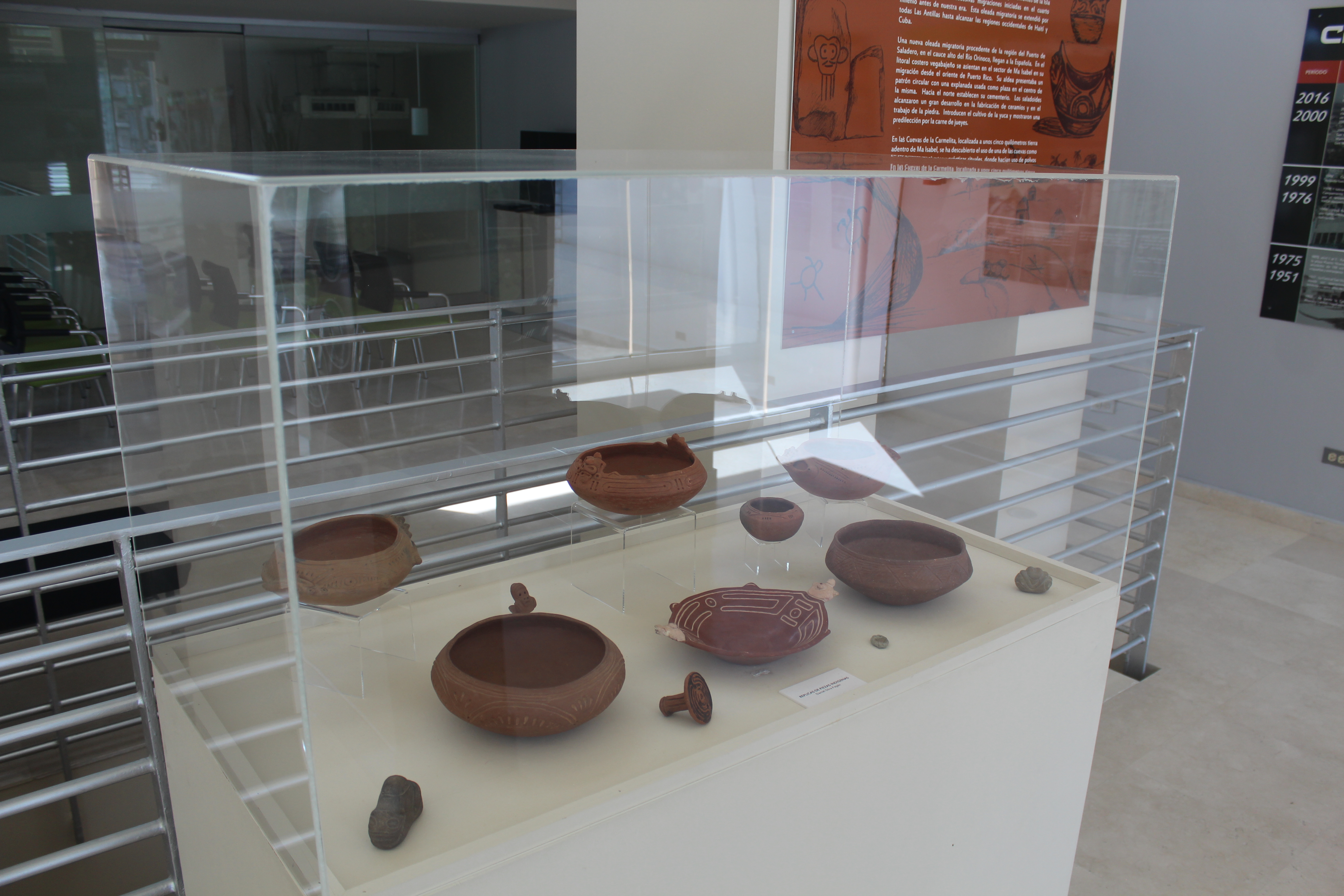
Taíno pottery from one of the various archeological sites in the region.

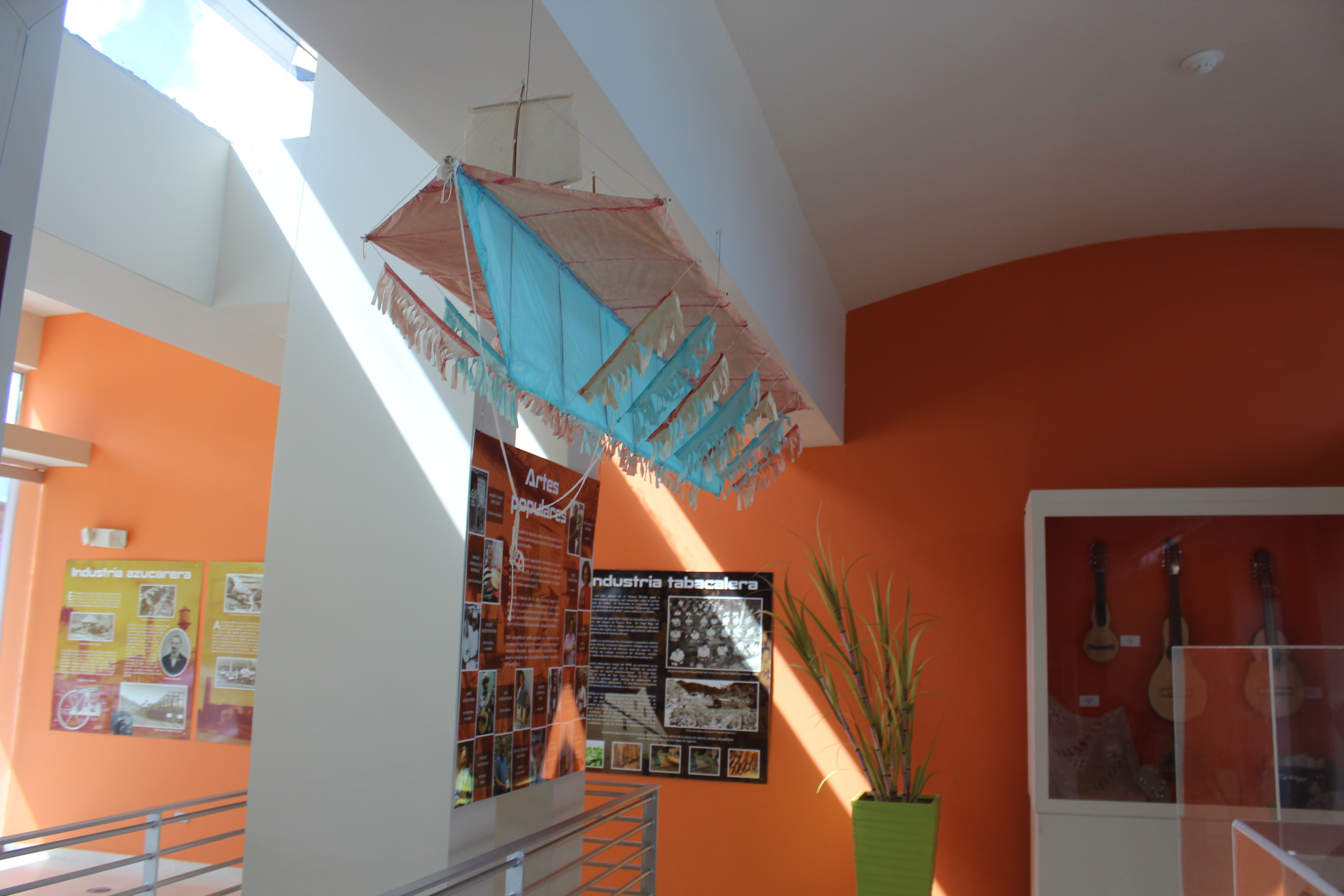
Exhibit on the local industries, arts and crafts.
