= Vega Baja barrio-pueblo =

Historical and administrative center (seat) of Vega Baja, Puerto Rico

Vega Baja barrio-pueblo Pueblo de Vega Baja
- Municipality seat
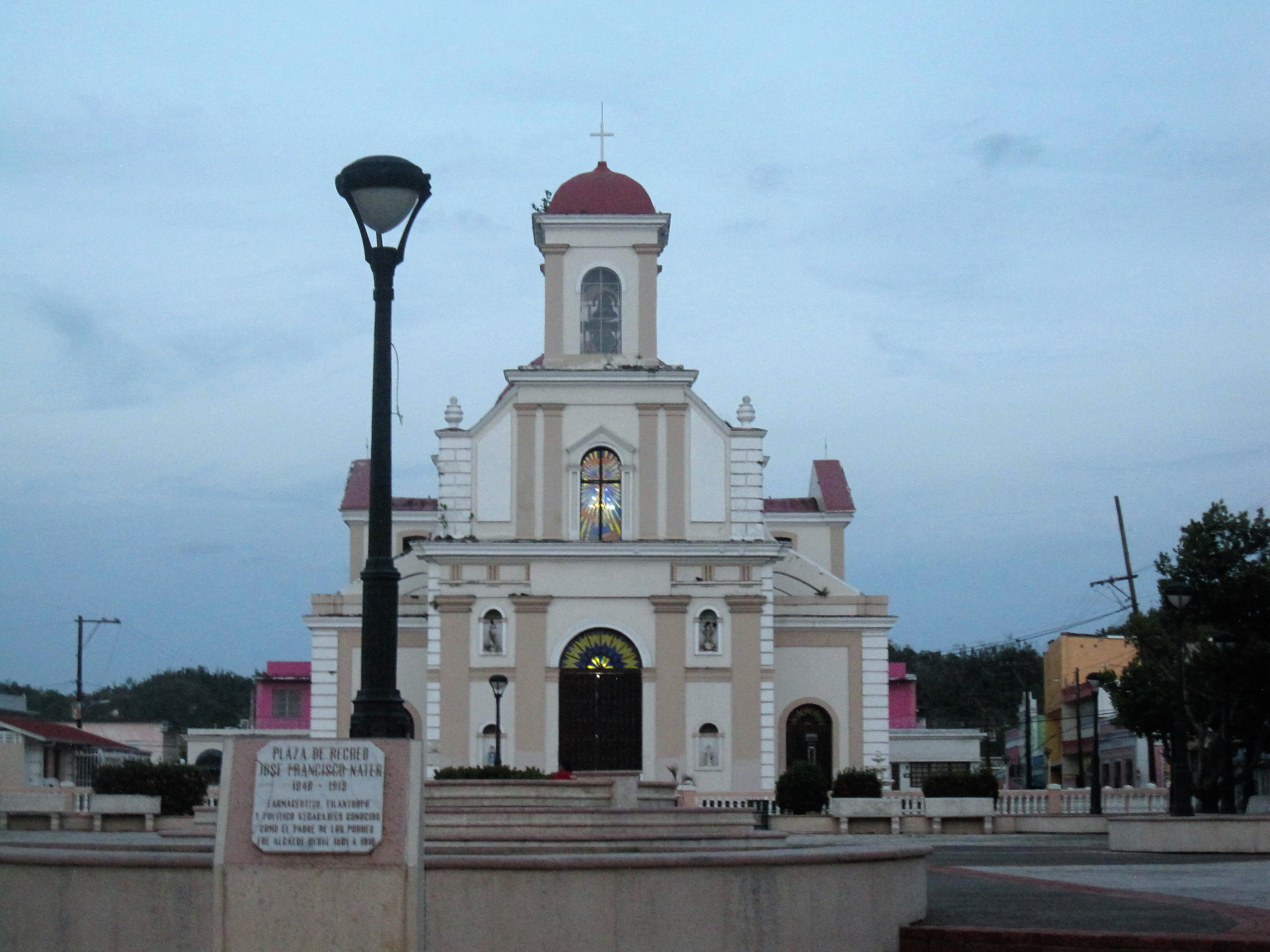
- Parroquia Nuestra Señora del Rosario in the Plaza José Francisco Náter

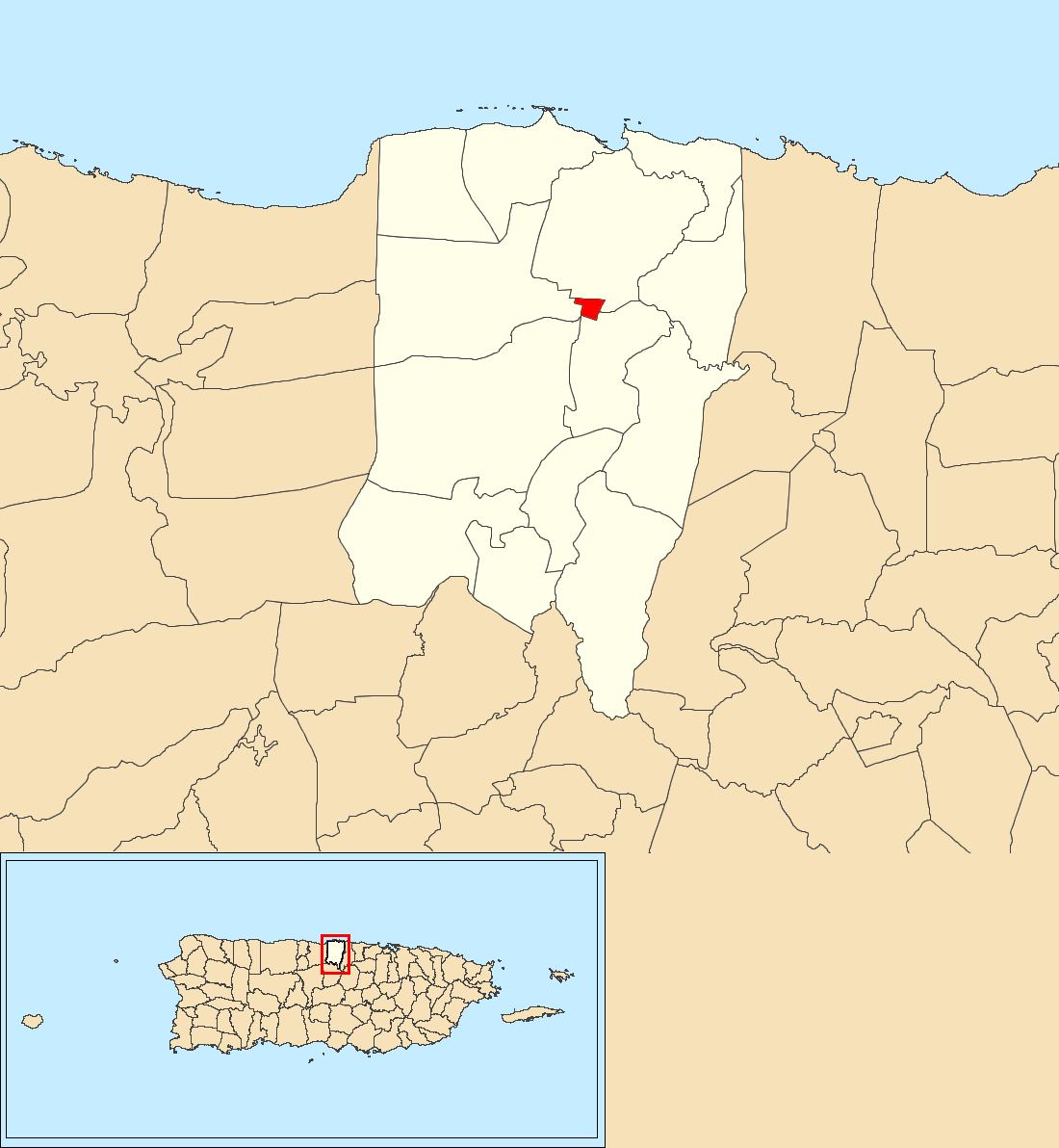
- Location of Vega Baja barrio-pueblo within the municipality of Vega Baja shown in red

- Location of Puerto Rico
- Coordinates: 18°26′40″N 66°23′13″W
- Commonwealth: Puerto Rico
- Municipality: Vega Baja

Area
  - Total: 0.11 sq mi (0.28 km^{2})
  - Land: 0.11 sq mi (0.28 km^{2})
  - Water: 0 sq mi (0 km^{2})
- Elevation: 23 ft (7.0 m)

Population (2010)
  - Total: 816
  - Density: 8,160/sq mi (3,150/km^{2})
- Source: 2010 Census
- Time zone: UTC−4 (AST)

Vega Baja barrio-pueblo is a barrio and downtown area that serves as the administrative center (seat) of Vega Baja, a municipality of Puerto Rico. Its population in 2010 was 816.

== The central plaza and its church ==
As was customary in Spain, in Puerto Rico, the municipality has a barrio called pueblo which contains a central plaza, the municipal buildings (city hall), and a Catholic church. Fiestas patronales (patron saint festivals) are held in the central plaza every year.

The Vega Baja central plaza is called La Plaza José Francisco Náter, and is named after a pharmacist from Vega Baja who was also one of its mayors. The central plaza, or square, is a place for official and unofficial recreational events and a place where people can gather and socialize from dusk to dawn. The Laws of the Indies, Spanish law, which regulated life in Puerto Rico in the early 19th century, stated the plaza's purpose was for "the parties" (celebrations, festivities) (Spanish: a propósito para las fiestas), and that the square should be proportionally large enough for the number of neighbors (Spanish: grandeza proporcionada al número de vecinos). These Spanish regulations also stated that the streets nearby should be comfortable portals for passersby, protecting them from the elements: sun and rain.

Located across from the central plaza is the Church Santa María del Rosario of Vega Baja, a Roman Catholic church which was inaugurated in 1870. There had been another church there, built in 1795 and demolished in 1860. The church has been listed in the National Register of Historic Places since 1984. The entire historic downtown zone (pueblo) of Vega Baja has also been listed on the Puerto Rico Register of Historic Sites and Zones since 2004.

== History ==
Historical population
Census	Pop.	Note	%±
1900	2,288		—
1910	3,082		34.7%
1920	3,607		17.0%
1930	4,784		32.6%
1940	5,409		13.1%
1950	5,536		2.3%
1960	3,718		−32.8%
1970	0		−100.0%
1980	1,609		—
1990	1,215		−24.5%
2000	890		−26.7%
2010	816		−8.3%
U.S. Decennial Census; 1899 (shown as 1900) 1910-1930; 1930-1950 1960 1980-2000 2010

Before being settled, the area used to be a sugarcane plantation. The settlement that is today Vega Baja barrio-pueblo (downtown Vega Baja) was first founded in 1776 as Vega-Baxa del Naranjal de Nuestra Señora del Rosario by Don Antonio Viera in an area originally owned by Don Manuel Negrón Benítez. This is also considered the official founding of the municipality itself. The famous Casa Alonso is a good example of the Neoclassical vernacular style developed by sugarcane plantation owners in the downtown area during this time.

Vega Baja barrio-pueblo was in Spain's gazetteers until Puerto Rico was ceded by Spain in the aftermath of the Spanish–American War under the terms of the Treaty of Paris of 1898 and became an unincorporated territory of the United States. In 1899, the United States Department of War conducted a census of Puerto Rico finding that the population of Pueblo was 2,288. The current city hall was built and inaugurated in 1923.

== Landmarks and places of interest ==
- Adrián Santos Tirado School of Fine Arts (Escuela de Bellas Artes Adrián Santos Tirado), municipal fine arts school also containing a digital library.
- Casa Alonso, a neoclassical historic house and local art museum listed on the National Register of Historic Places (NRHP) since 1996.
- Casa Portela Museum, a historic house and local history museum located in a revitalized city block.
- Centro de Investigaciones Históricas Luis de la Rosa Martínez, a cultural institution, research center and municipal archives dedicated to the local arts, geography, history, photography and demographics.
- Church Santa María del Rosario, the historic Roman Catholic parish church of Vega Baja, located at the traditional public town square (Plaza José Francisco Náter).
- Cine Teatro Félix, located in the former Félix Theater (Teatro Félix), a Silent film era theater.
- Héctor Joy Sandín Marketplace (Plaza del Mercado Héctor Joy Sandín), the traditional town marketplace of Vega Baja contains stores, restaurants and other retail.
- Melao Melao Artisanal Center (Centro Artesanal Melao Melao), cultural institution dedicated to the local traditional arts and crafts.
- Migrants Square (Plaza de los Inmigrantes)
- Old Vega Baja Cemetery, the old municipal cemetery is located right outside of the historic downtown and it includes prominent tombs such as the NRHP-listed Otero-Martinez Mausoleum.
- Old Train Station of Vega Baja (Antigua Estación del Tren), the former railway station from 1891 now hosts a small museum dedicated to the history of the local railway system.
- Rafael Canó Llovio Building (Edificio Rafael Canó Llovio), a historic building now housing government offices.
- Teatro América, a historic Art Deco style former cinema turned into a theater and cultural center.
- Sculptural Relief of the History of Vega Baja
- Vega Baja City Hall (Casa Alcaldía de Vega Baja), the historic city hall building.

== Gallery ==
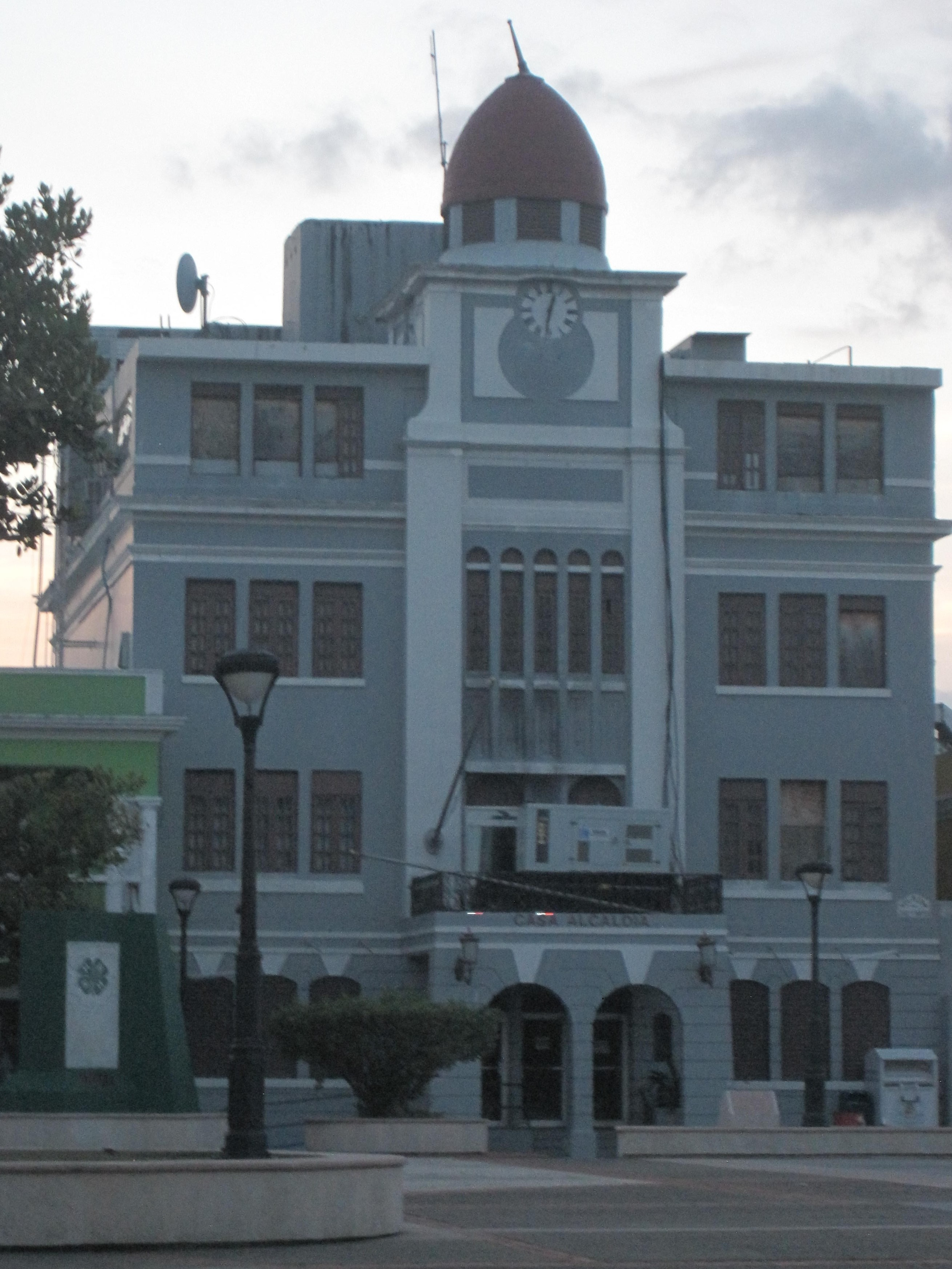
Vega Baja City Hall (2019)

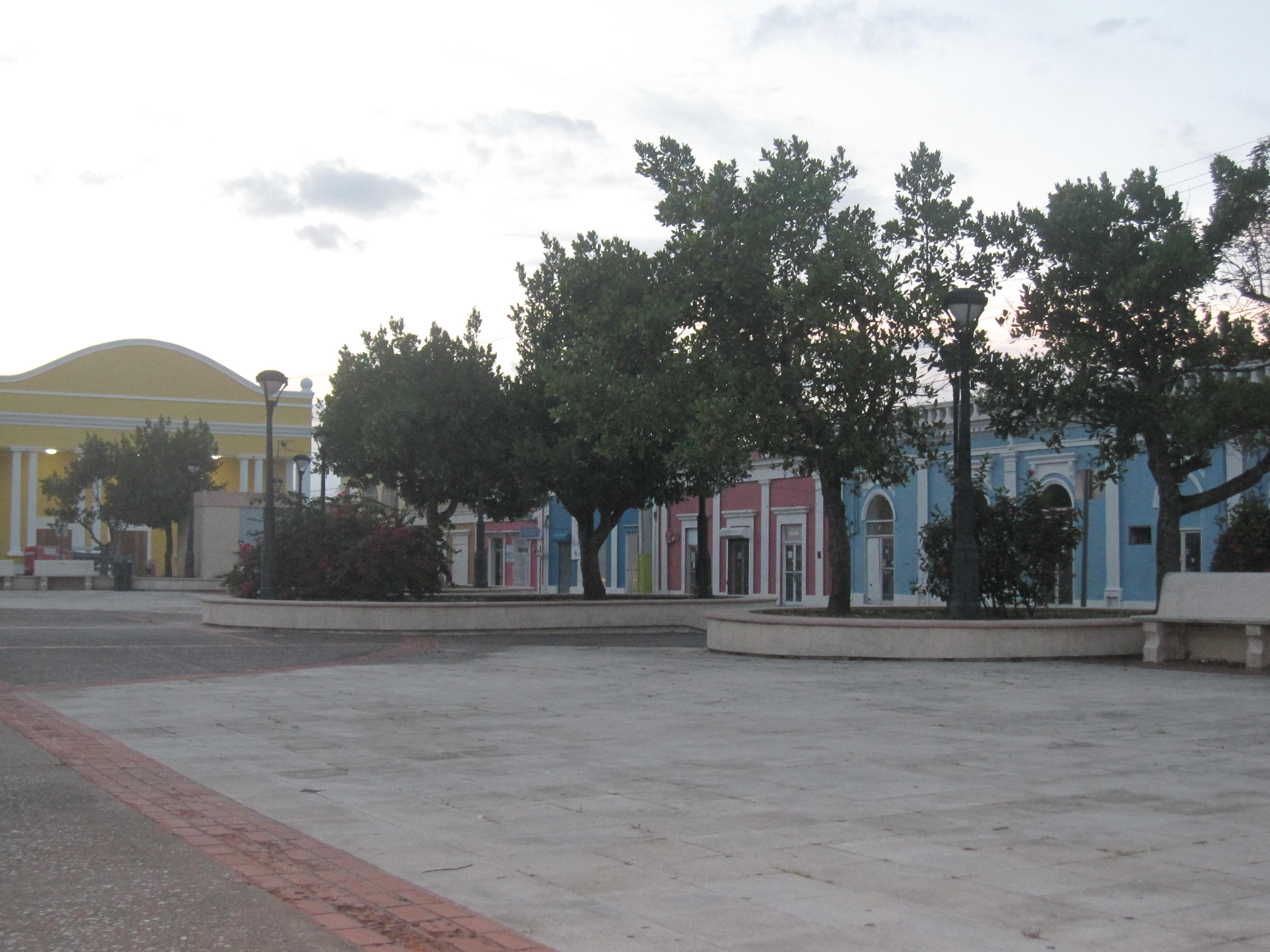
Plaza José Francisco Náter (2019)

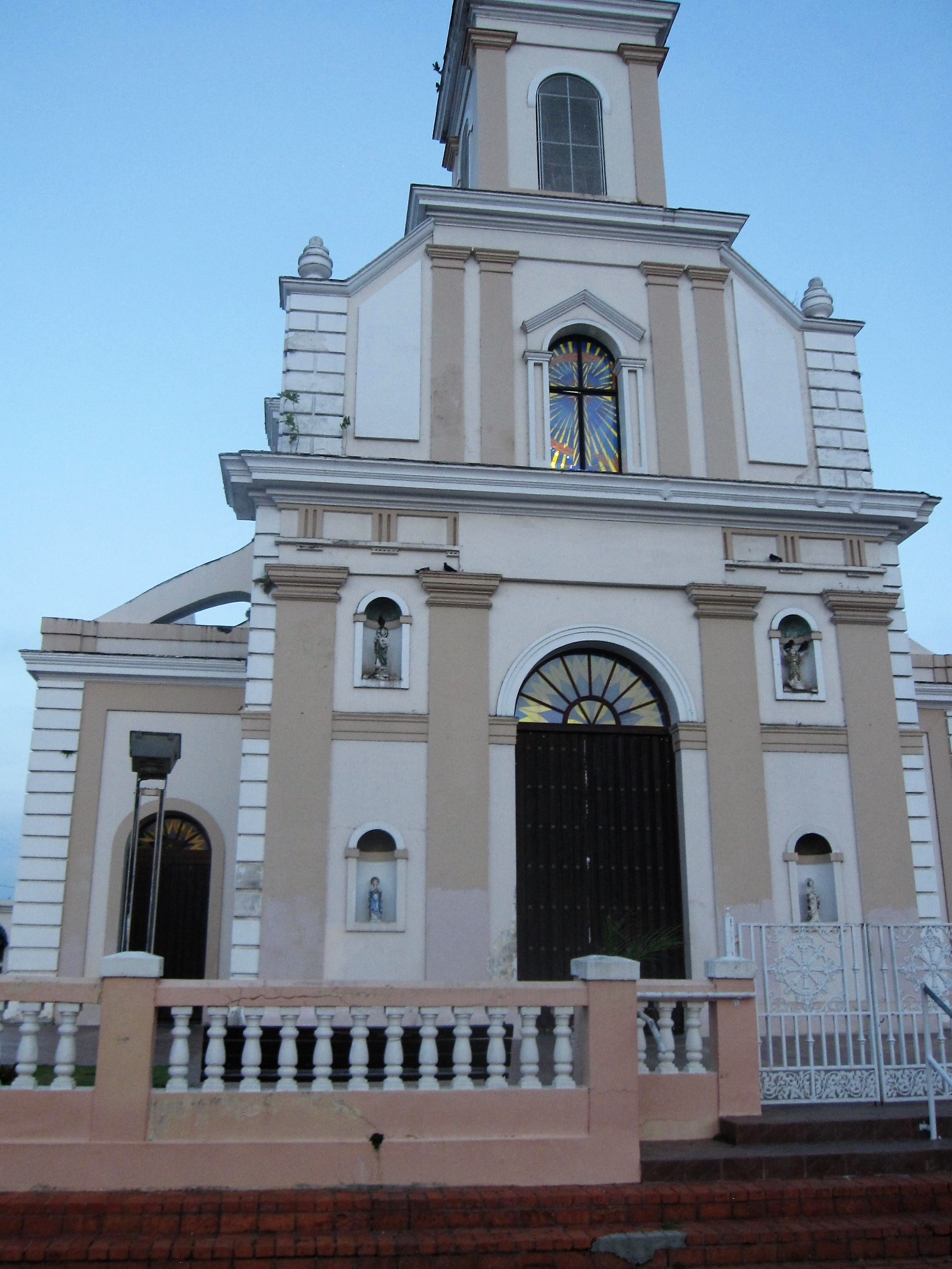
Closeup of the town's parish church (2019)

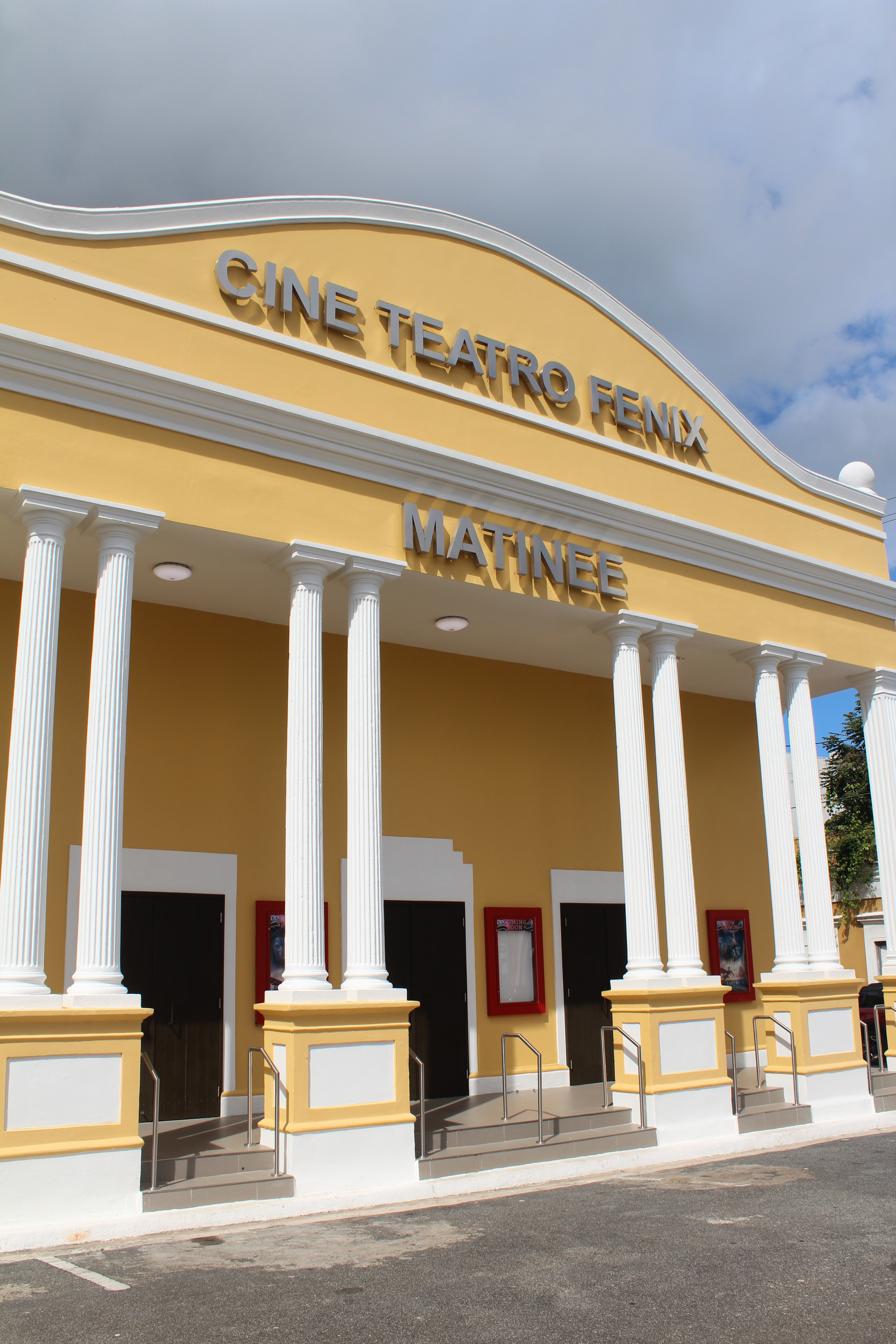
Cine Teatro Félix (2023)

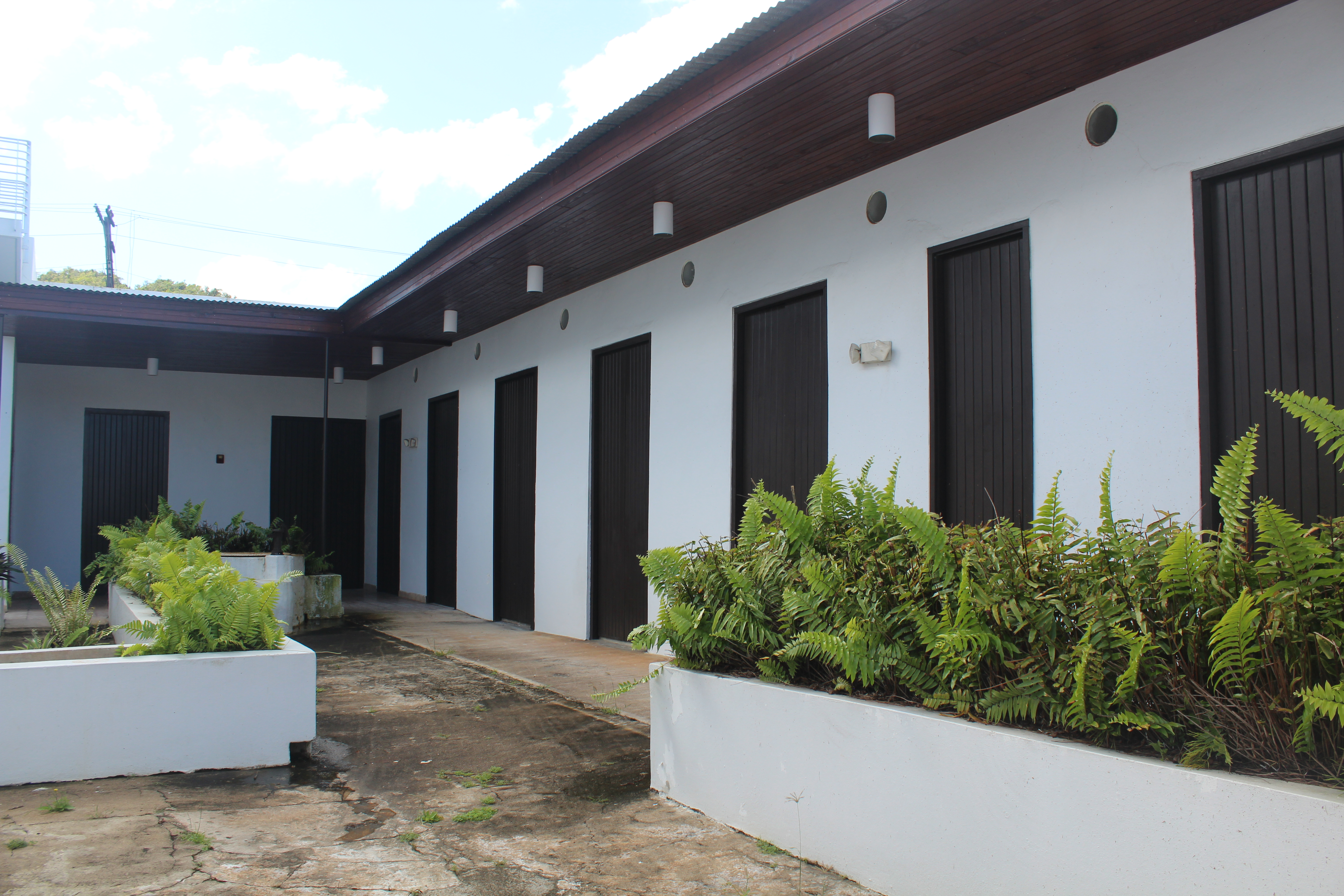
Casa Portela courtyard (2023)

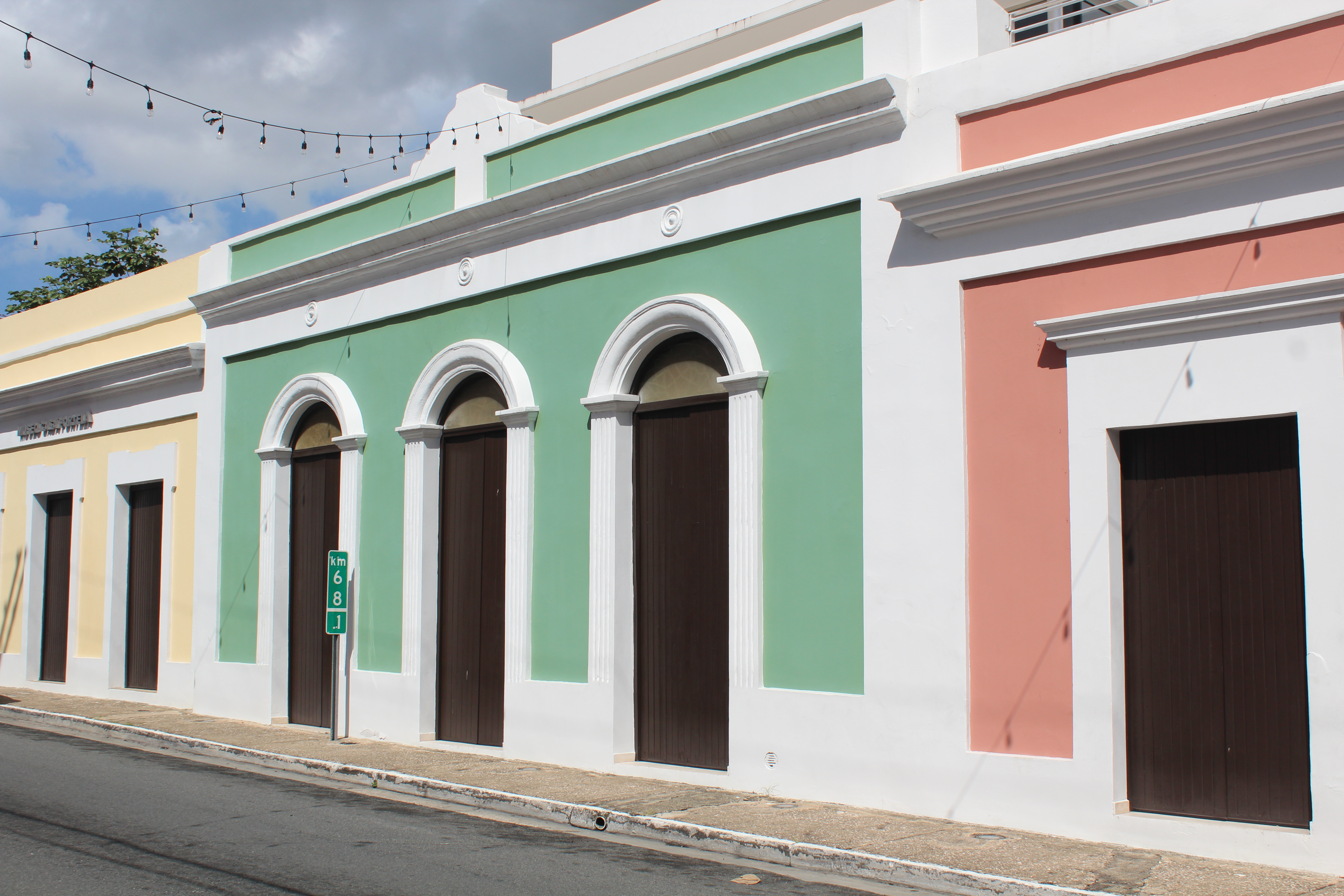
Betances Street (2023)

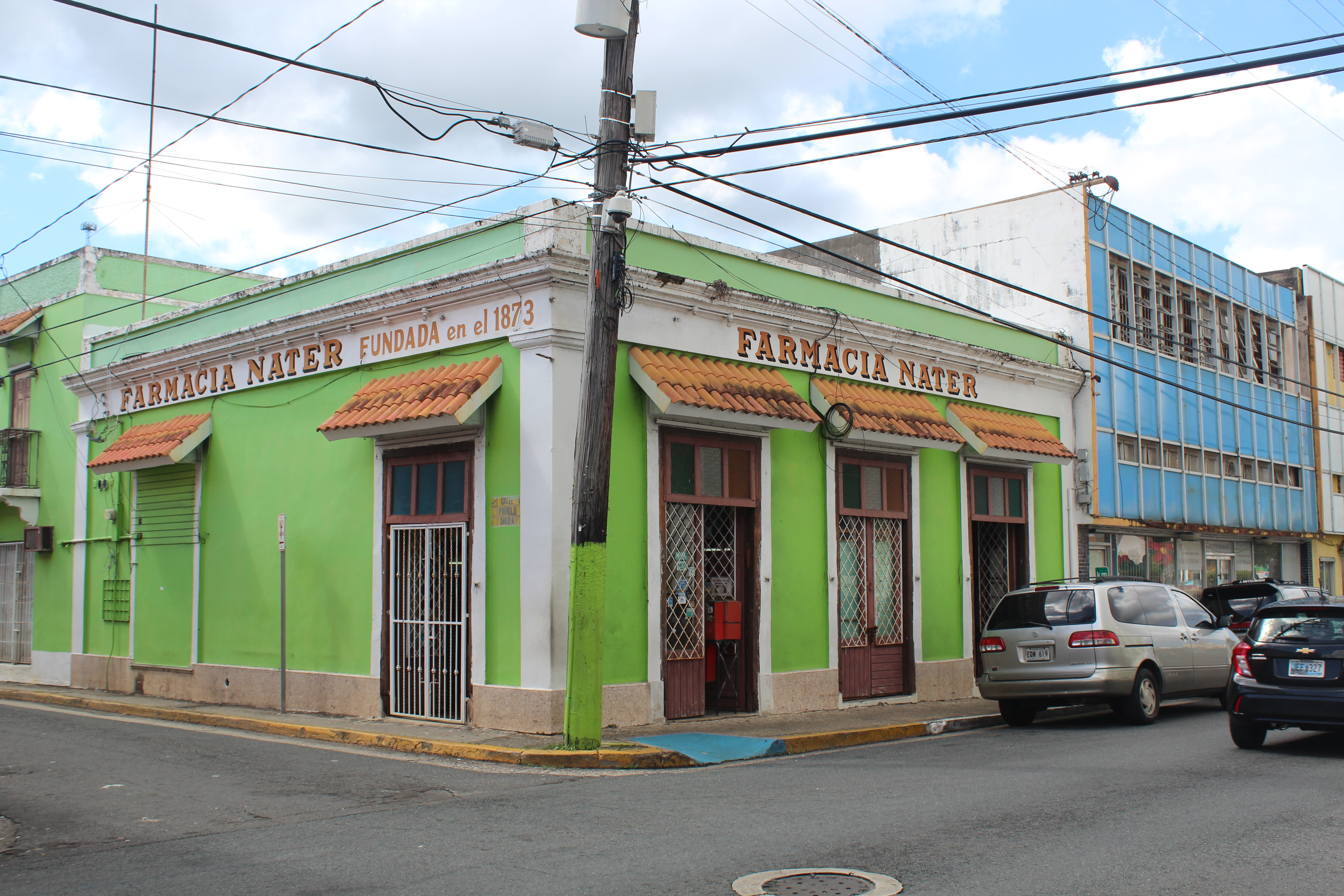
Historic Náter Pharmacy (2023)

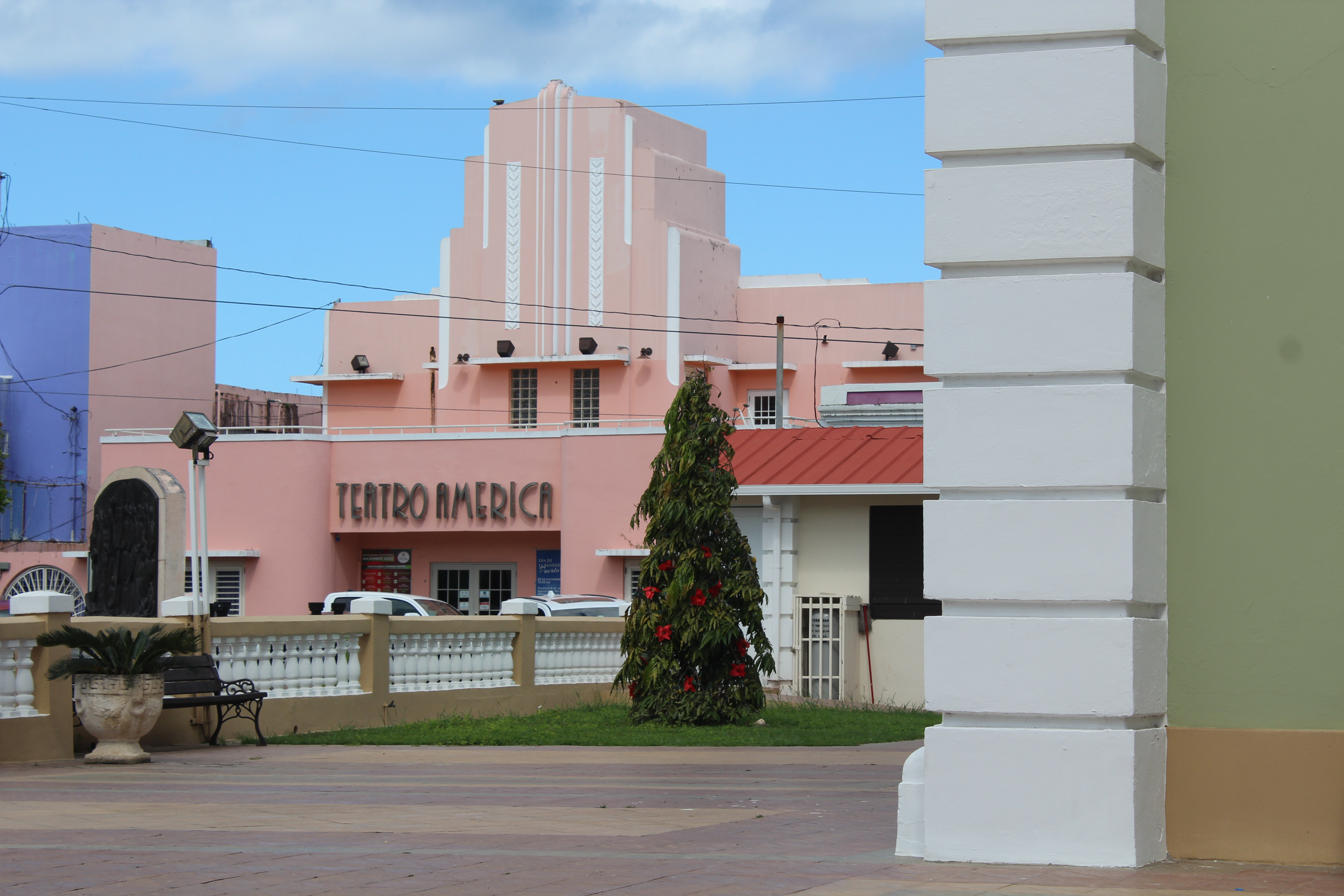
Teatro América from the church (2023)

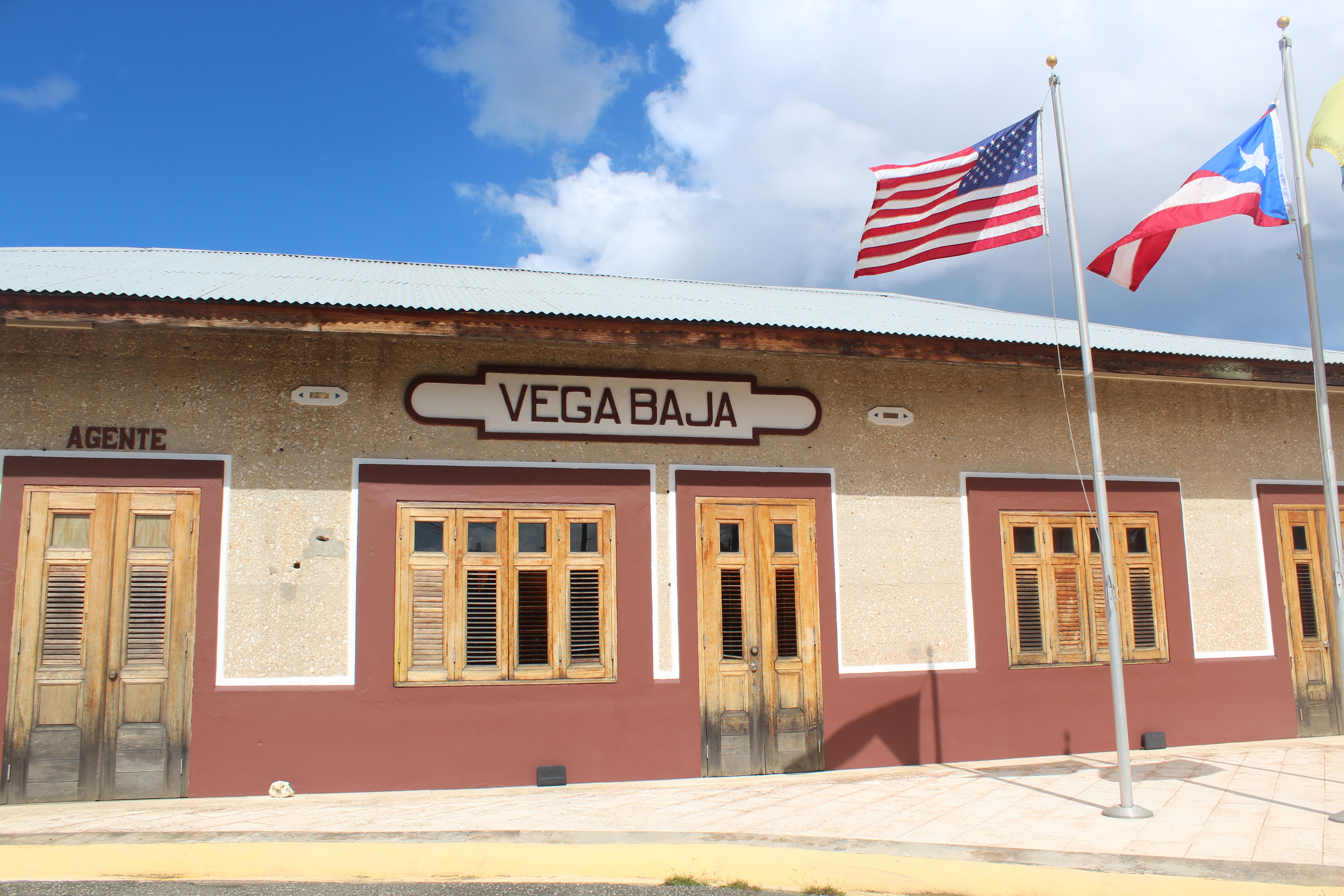
Old railway station (2023).

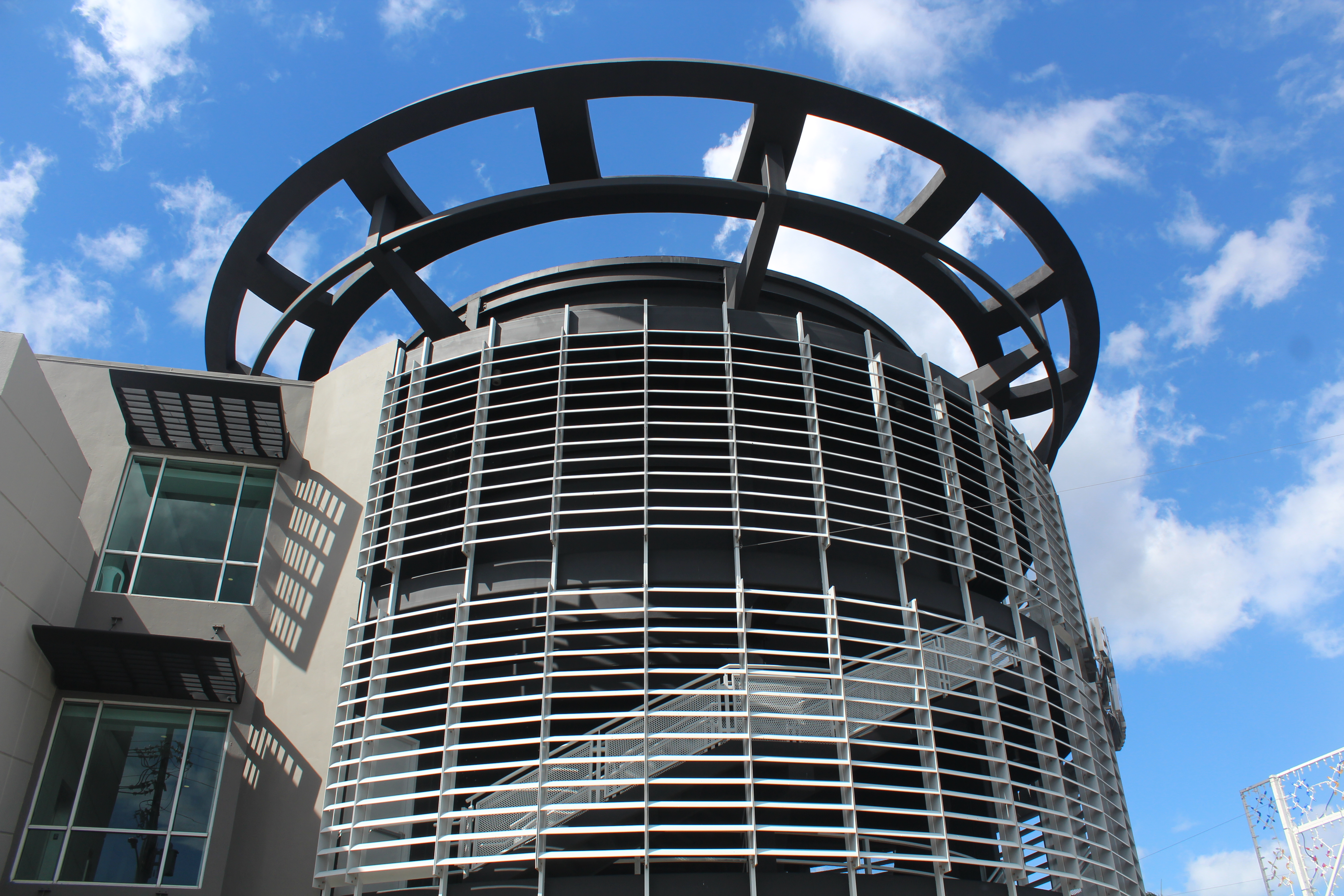
Vega Baja School of Fine Arts (2023)

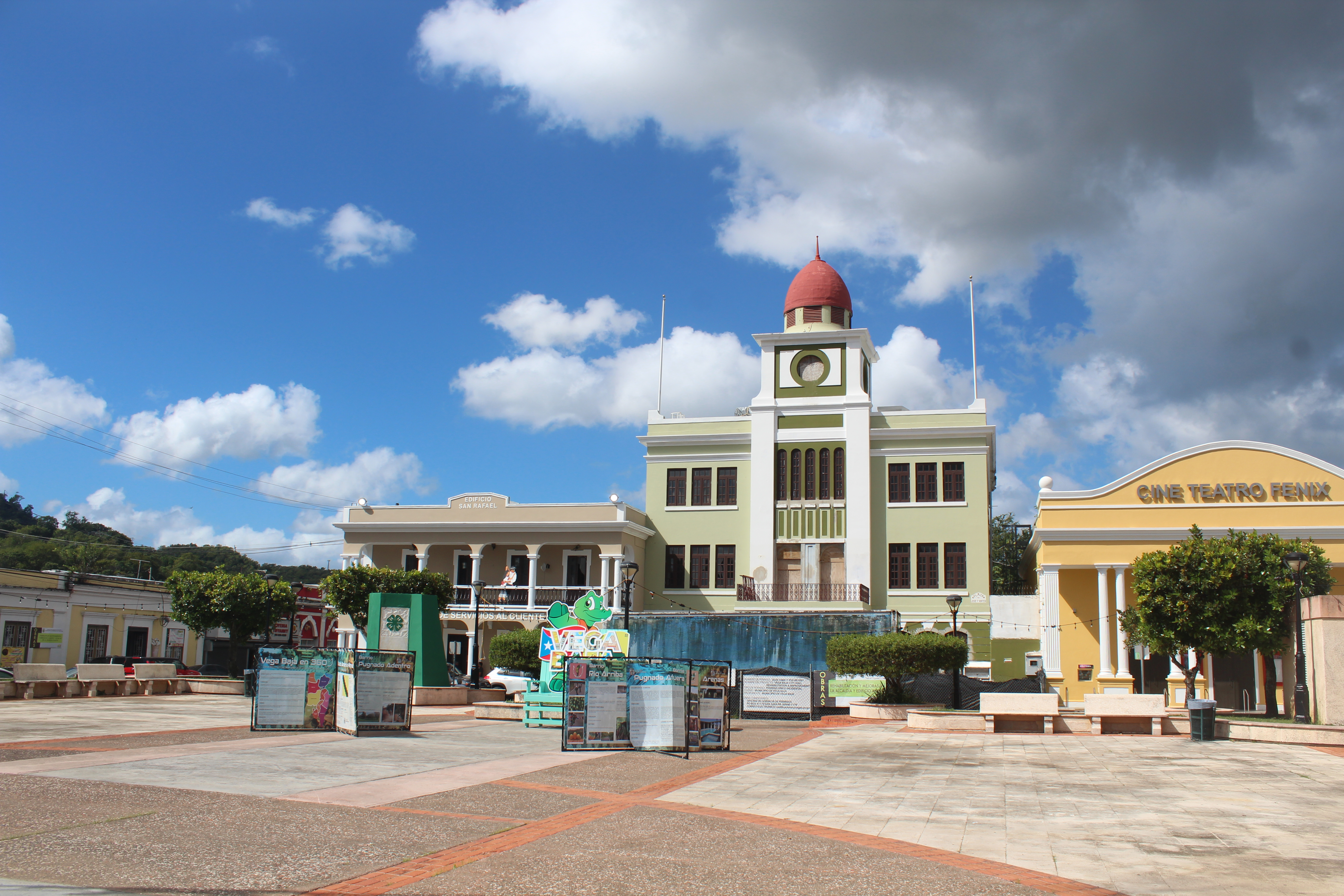
Vega Baja city hall and plaza (2023)

== See also ==
- List of communities in Puerto Rico
