= Alonzo =

Alonzo is both a given name and a Spanish surname. Notable people with the name include:

== Given name ==
- Alonzo de Barcena, 16th-century Spanish Jesuit missionary and linguist
- Alonzo de Santa Cruz (c. 1505–1567), Spanish cartographer, mapmaker, instrument maker, historian and teacher
- Alonzo Addae (born 1997), Canadian football player
- Alonzo Babers (b. 1961), American sprinter
- Alonzo L. Best (1854–1923), American politician
- Alonzo Bodden, American comedian
- Alonzo Bowman (1848–1885), US Army Medal of Honor recipient
- Alonzo Church (1903–1995), American mathematician and computer scientist
- Alonzo Clemons, American autistic savant clay sculptor
- Alonzo B. Coons (1841–1914), American lawyer and politician
- Alonzo B. Cornell (1832–1904), a governor of New York
- Alonzo Drake (1884–1919), English footballer and cricketer
- Alonzo J. Edgerton (1827–1896), American politician
- Alonzo Dillard Folger (1888–1941), American politician
- Alonzo Gee, American basketball player
- Alonzo A. Hinckley (1870–1936), American official of the Church of Jesus Christ of Latter-day Saints
- Alonzo Horton (1813–1910), developer of San Diego, California
- Alonzo Jackson (b. 1980), NFL football player
- Alonzo King (b. 1952), American dancer and choreographer
- Alonzo Lawrence (b. 1989), American football player
- Alonzo C. Mather (1848–1941), founder of the Mather Stock Car Company
- Alonzo J. Mathison (1876–1941), American politician
- Alonzo B. May (1906–1968), American economist
- Alonzo Mourning (b. 1970), American basketball player
- Alonzo Muhlach (b. 2010), Filipino actor
- Alonzo W. Pond (1894–1986), American archaeologist and speleogist
- Alonzo Sargent, (fl. 1918), American locomotive engineer
- Alonzo Saclag,(1942–2025), Filipino musician and dancer
- Alonzo Smith (1842–1927), Union soldier, recipient of the Medal of Honor
- Alonzo Swales (1870–1952), British trade unionist
- Allonzo Trier (born 1996), American basketball player
- Alonzo Williams (born 1957), American DJ
- Alonzo Williams (born 1963), American football player

== Surname ==
- Anne-Marie Alonzo (1951–2005), Canadian playwright, poet, novelist, critic and publisher
- Bea Alonzo (born 1987), Filipino actress and model
- Chad Alonzo, Filipino basketball player
- Chinggoy Alonzo (1950–2017), Filipino actor
- Jérôme Alonzo (born 1972), French football (soccer) player
- John A. Alonzo (1934–2001), U.S. cinematographer
- Mariano Roque Alonzo (died 1853), President of Provisional Junta of Paraguay from 9 February 1841 to 14 March 1841
- Pierre Alonzo (footballer) (1940–2024), former French football player

== Fictional characters ==
- Alonzo Quixano, the protagonist of the novel Don Quixote de la Mancha by Miguel de Cervantes
- Alonzo, from Disney's 101 Dalmatians
- Mr Alonzo Smith, played by Leon Ames, and Alonzo 'Lon' Smith Jr., played by Henry H. Daniels Jr., from Meet Me in St. Louis (1944)
- Alonzo (cat), in T. S. Eliot's poetry and the musical CATS
- Alonzo Todd, cousin of Peter Todd in the Billy Bunter books
- Pierre Alonzo, a pseudonym of Richard E. Hughes
- Alonzo Harris, played by Denzel Washington in Antoine Fuqua's 2001 crime-thriller Training Day

== See also ==
- Alonso
- Alfonso
- Lonzo
