= Dani Alonso =

Brazilian politician (born 1988)

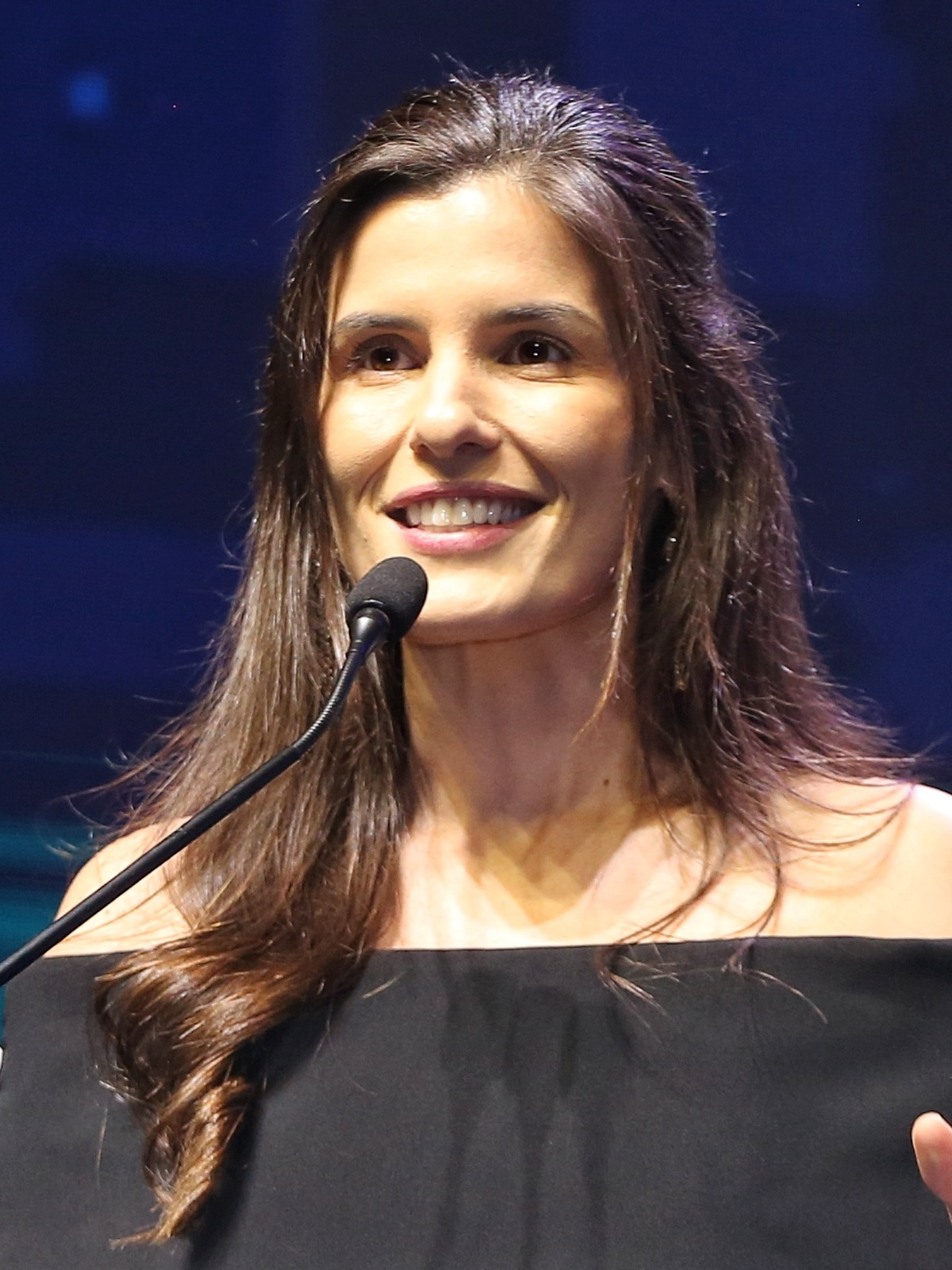
- Alonso in 2023

Member of the Legislative Assembly of São Paulo
- Incumbent
- Assumed office 15 March 2023

Personal details
- Born: 23 June 1988 (age 38)
- Party: Liberal Party (since 2018)
- Parent: Daniel Alonso (father)

Daniele Mazuqueli Alonso (born 23 June 1988) is a Brazilian politician serving as a member of the Legislative Assembly of São Paulo since 2023. She is the daughter of Daniel Alonso.
