= Alonso López =

Alonso López may refer to:

- Alonso López (boxer) (born 1986), Mexican flyweight boxer
- Alonso López (footballer) (1956–2026), Colombian footballer
- Alonso López (motorcyclist) (born 2001), Spanish motorcycle racer
