= Alonzo B. May =

American professor of economics (1906–1968)

Alonzo Beryl May (1906, Joplin, Missouri – 1968, Denver, Colorado) was an American professor of economics at the University of Denver.

May earned academic degrees at Kansas State Teachers College, the University of Kansas and the University of Iowa.

He taught at Graceland College in Iowa and Simmons College in Boston, then accepted an appointment at the University of Denver, Denver, Colorado. During World War II, May served as Personnel Officer on the staff of the Commander of the 7th Amphibious Force in the Pacific and as an Instructor at the U. S. Naval Academy at Annapolis. After the war, he formed a Navy Reserve Unit in Denver and retired as a Commander in 1966.

At the University of Denver, May worked in the Department of Economics and the Division of Social Sciences in the College of Arts and Sciences, and the Division of Economics and Statistics in the College of Business Administration. He was Coordinator of the Department of Transportation and head of the Division of Administrative Environment in the College of Business Administration. He directed the Teaching Institute of Economics. He also participated in the founding of several Colorado financial institutions and served as a consultant and on boards of directors. He served a President of the University Senate. He was a member of the University Park Methodist Church, Royal Economics Society of England, American Economic Association, American Institute of Management and the Denver County and Colorado State Republican Assemblies.
