= Alonso Pérez =

Spanish painter

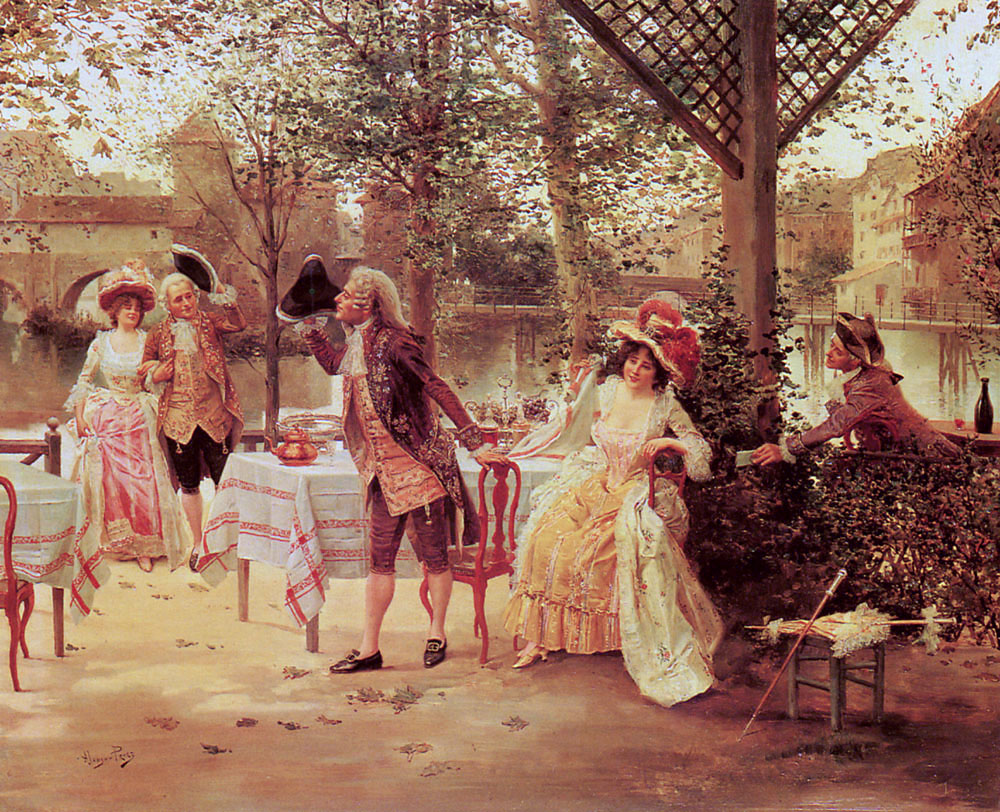
A Café by the River

Alonso Pérez (fl. 1881–1914) was a Spanish painter who worked at the end of the 19th, and the beginning of the 20th centuries.

While very little is known of his life, it is believed that he received some academic training. As with many of his contemporaries, his works were done on a small, intimate scale that created a need for careful examination by the viewer. Most of his work featured pretty women and handsome men in 18th century costumes, situated in market places.
