= Casa Alonso =

Museum and cultural center in Vega Baja, Puerto Rico

- U.S. National Register of Historic Places
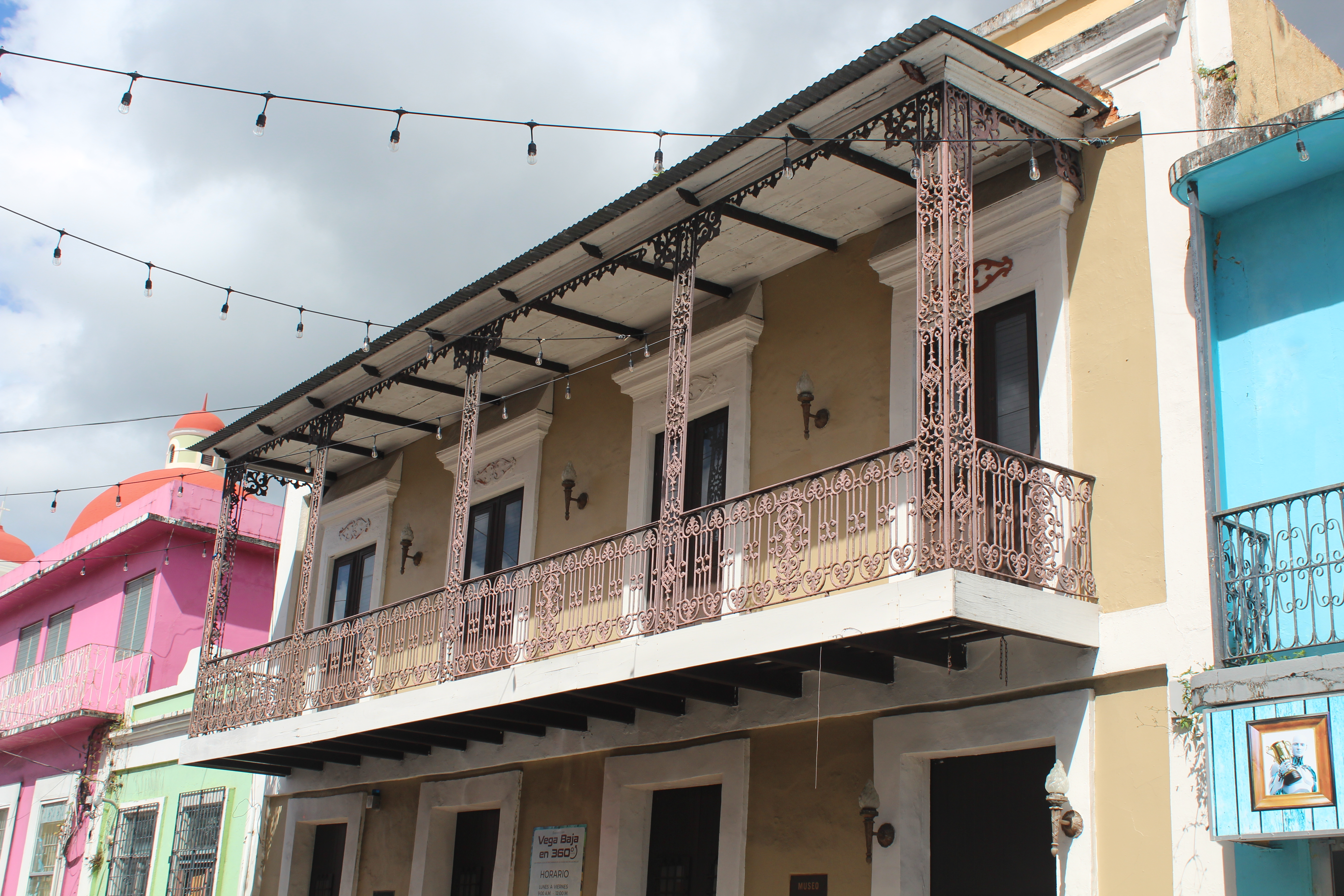
- Façade of Casa Alonso (2023)

- Location within Puerto Rico
- Location: 34 Betances St., Vega Baja, Puerto Rico
- Coordinates: 18°26′46″N 66°23′12″W
- Architectural style: spanish colonial
- NRHP reference No.: 96001491
- Added to NRHP: December 13, 1996

Casa Alonso is a house museum and cultural center in Vega Baja Pueblo, the historic downtown of the municipality of Vega Baja, Puerto Rico. It was listed on the National Register of Historic Places in 1996. The house is also known as Museo de Arte, Historia y Cultura Casa Alonso, administered by the municipality of Vega Baja.

It is a two-story wood and masonry "neoclassical vernacular style" residence. It was lived in successively by Soliveras, Otero, and Alonso families, of sugar plantation wealth.

== Gallery ==
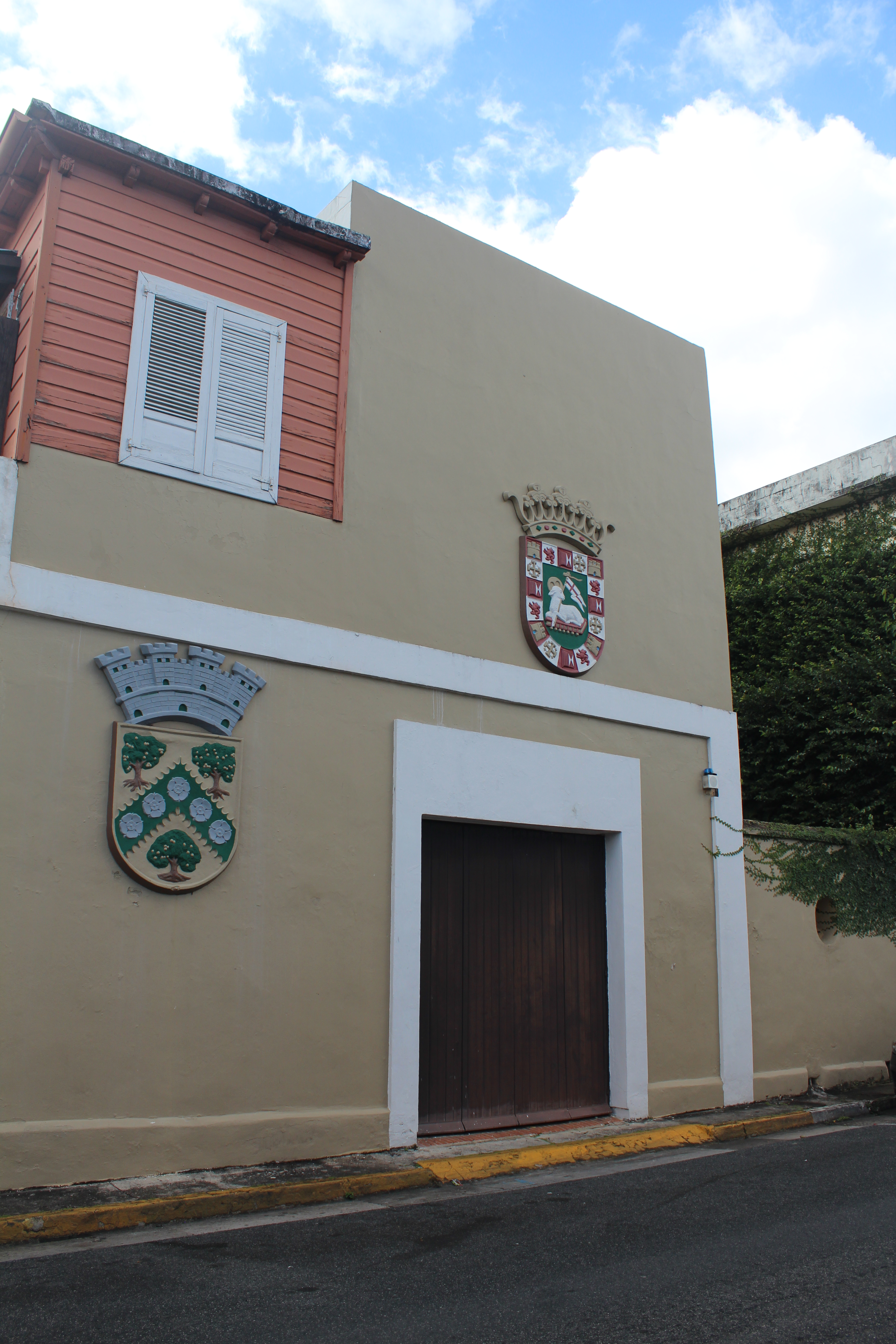
Casa Alonso from José Julián Acosta Street

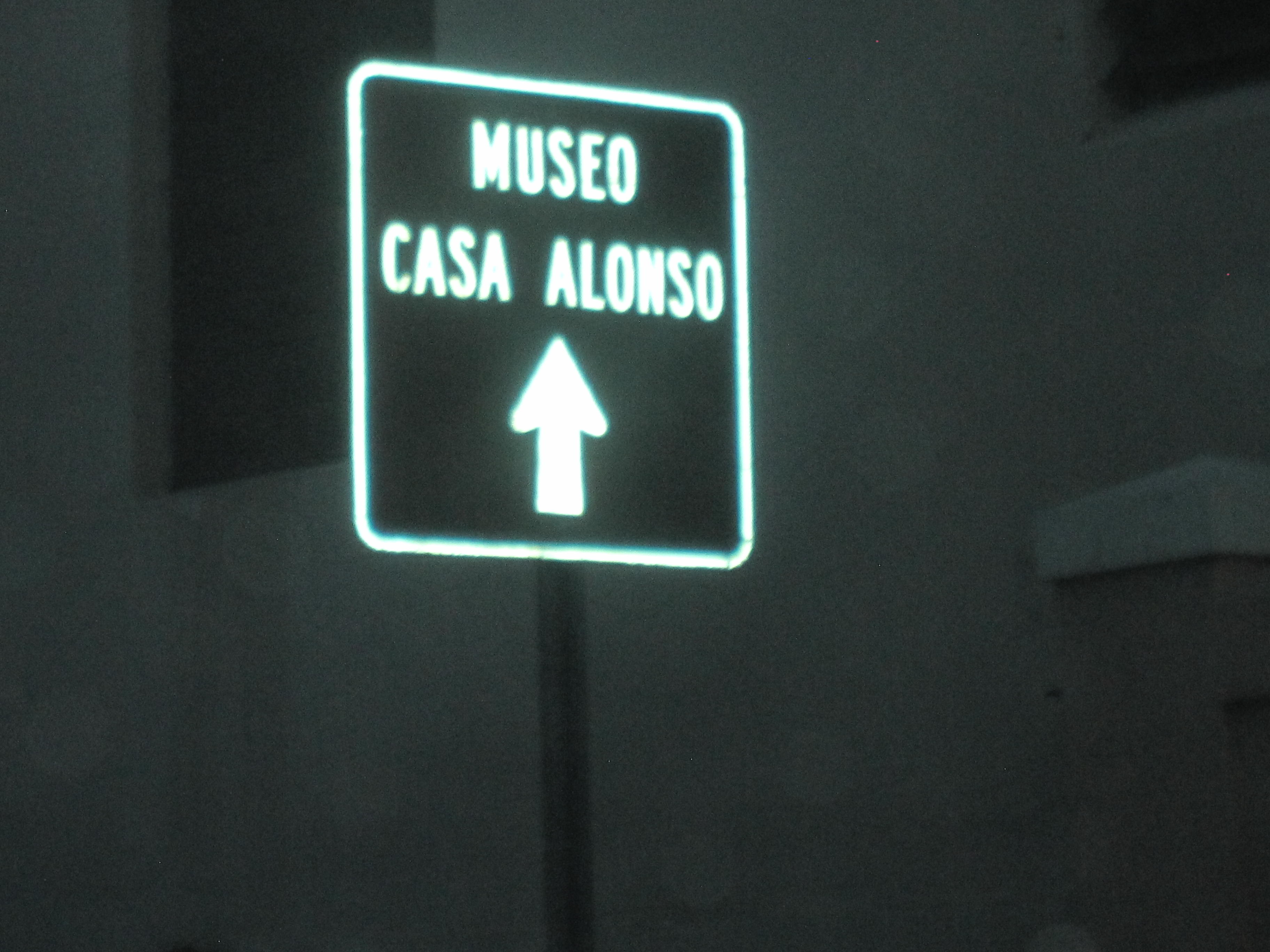
Sign for the Museo Casa Alonso in Vega Baja Pueblo.

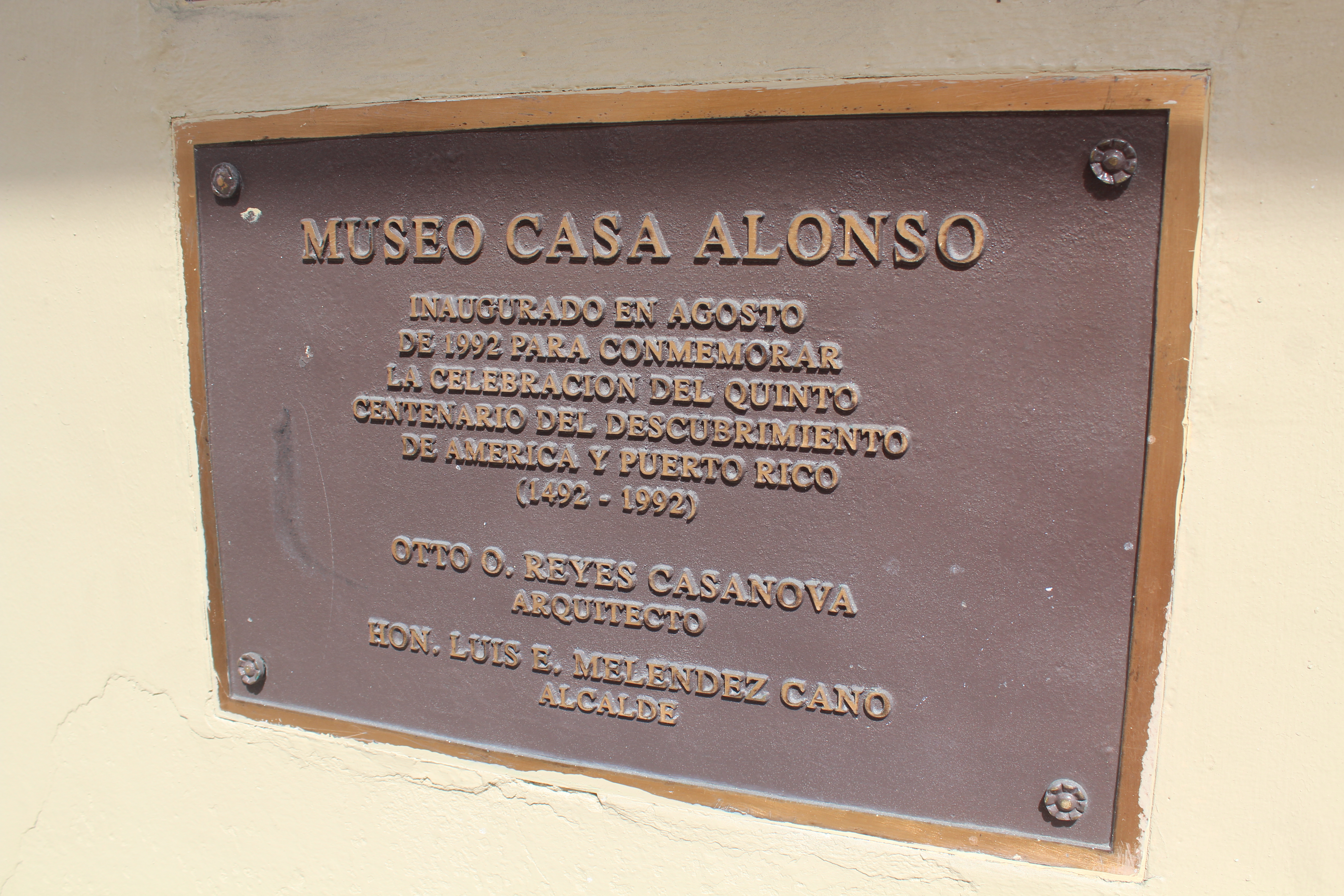
Casa Alonso museum dedication plaque.

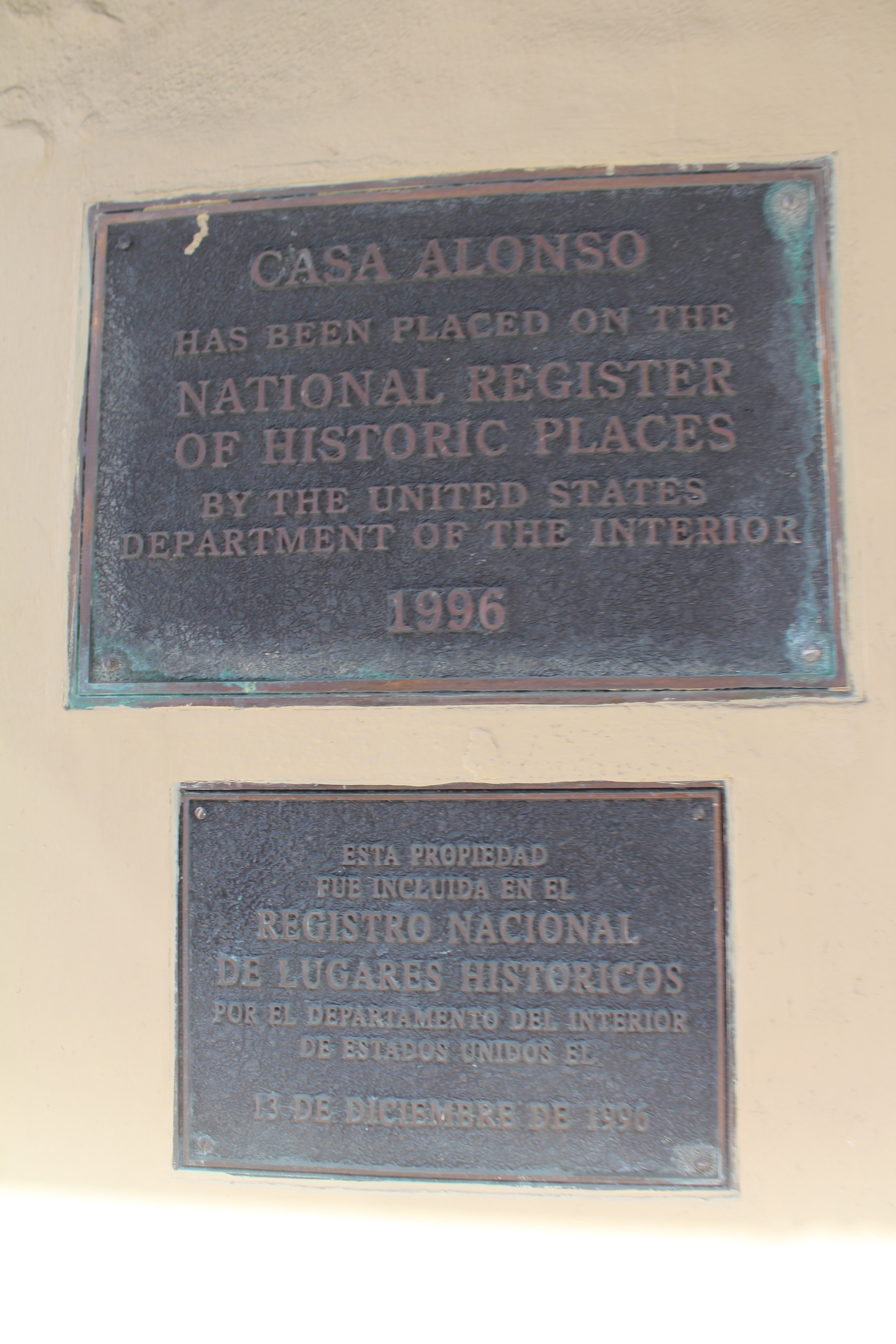
Casa Alonso National Register of Historic Places dedication plaque.
