= Church Santa María del Rosario of Vega Baja =

Church in Vega Baja, Puerto Rico

- U.S. National Register of Historic Places
- Puerto Rico Historic Sites and Zones
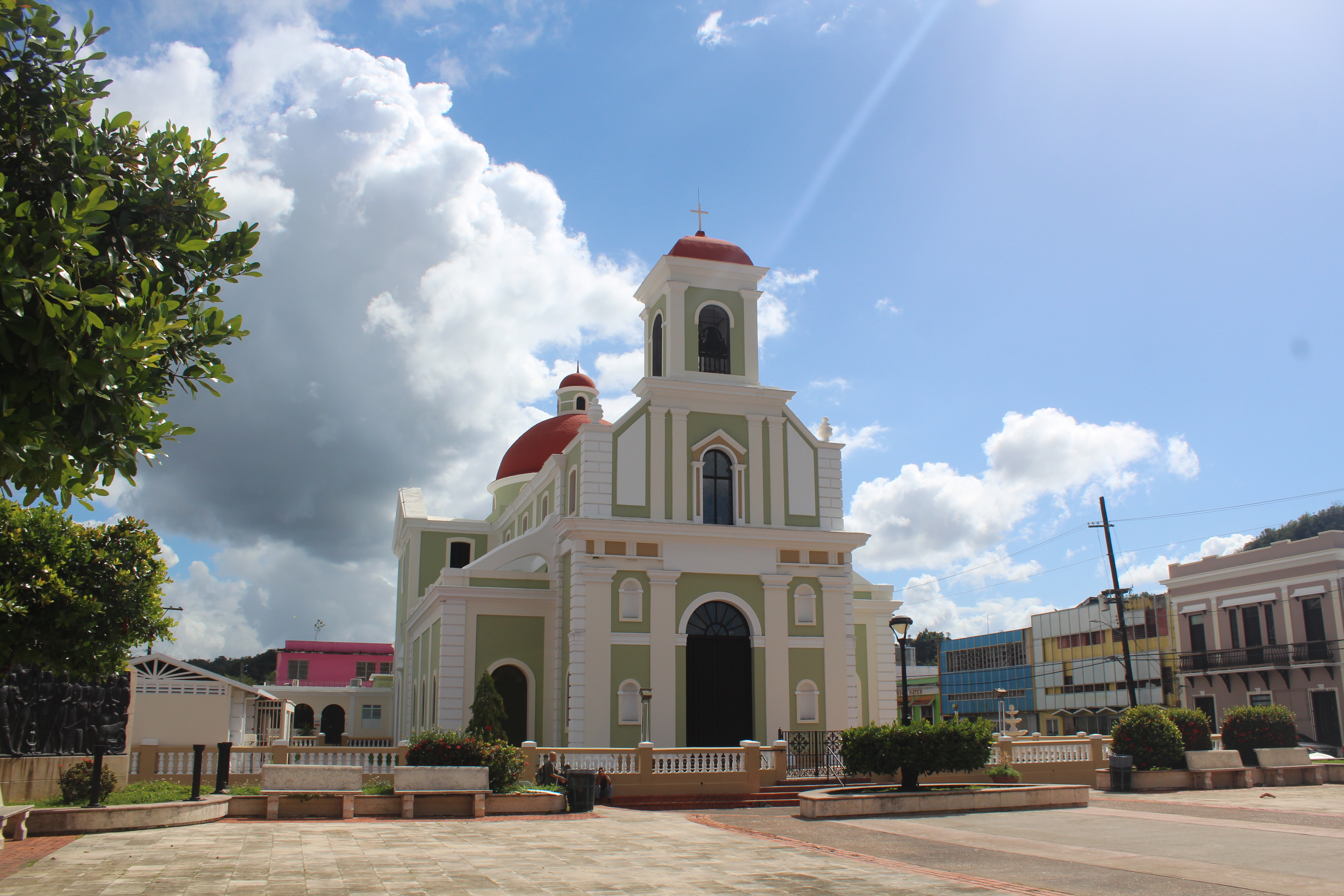
- Church façade (January 2023)

- Location within Puerto Rico
- Location: Town Plaza - 36 Betances Street, Vega Baja, Puerto Rico
- Coordinates: 18°15′50″N 66°14′01″W
- Area: Less than one acre
- Built: 1860-1874
- Architect: Antonio María Guitián
- MPS: Historic Churches of Puerto Rico TR
- NRHP reference No.: 84003133
- RNSZH No.: 2000-(RMSJ)-00-JP-SH

Significant dates
- Added to NRHP: September 18, 1984
- Designated RNSZH: February 3, 2000

The Church Santa María del Rosario of Vega Baja (Spanish: Iglesia Santa María del Rosario de Vega Baja) is a historic Catholic parish church from 1860 located in the main public square (plaza) of Vega Baja Pueblo, the historic and cultural downtown of the municipality of Vega Baja, Puerto Rico. The parish, which is part of the Roman Catholic Diocese of Arecibo, was added to the United States National Register of Historic Places in 1984 as part of the Historic Churches of Puerto Rico thematic multiple property submission. It was later added to the Puerto Rico Register of Historic Sites and Zones in 2000.

The church was designed by architect Antonio María Guitián and it was built in stages between the years 1850 and 1874, while being consecrated in 1860 and officially inaugurated on March 12, 1870. Its original clock tower was heavily damaged by the 1918 Aguadilla earthquake, and finally destroyed by the 1928 Okeechobee hurricane, better known as the San Felipe Segundo hurricane in Puerto Rico. In addition to its inscription in the National Register of Historic Places on September 18, 1984, the church was included in the municipally designated Historic Zone of Vega Baja in 2004.

The church is open to the public during weekday services at 6:30 AM and 7:00 PM, and during weekend services at 4:00 PM and 7:00 PM.

== Gallery ==
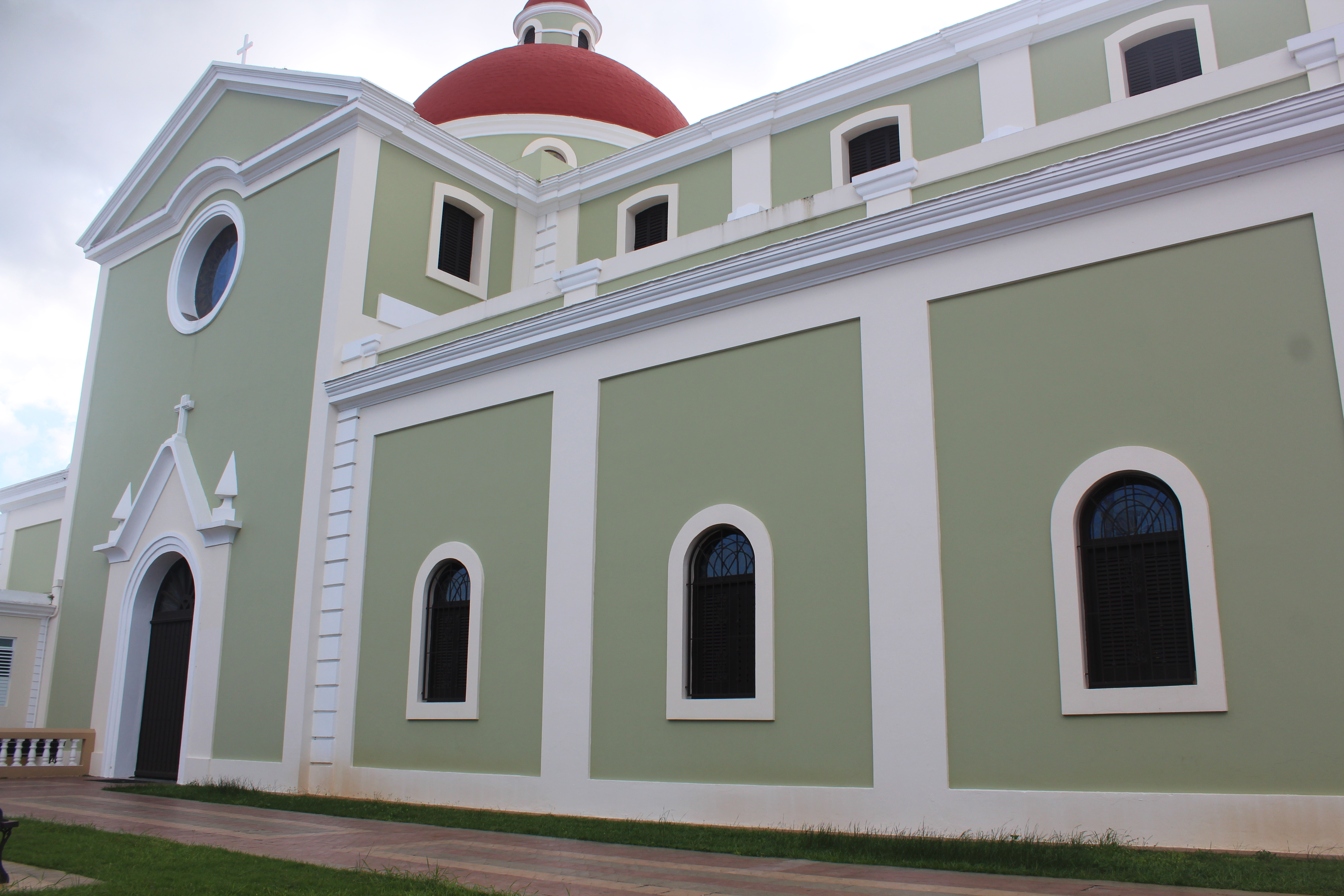
Church building side detail from José Julián Acosta Street, 2023.

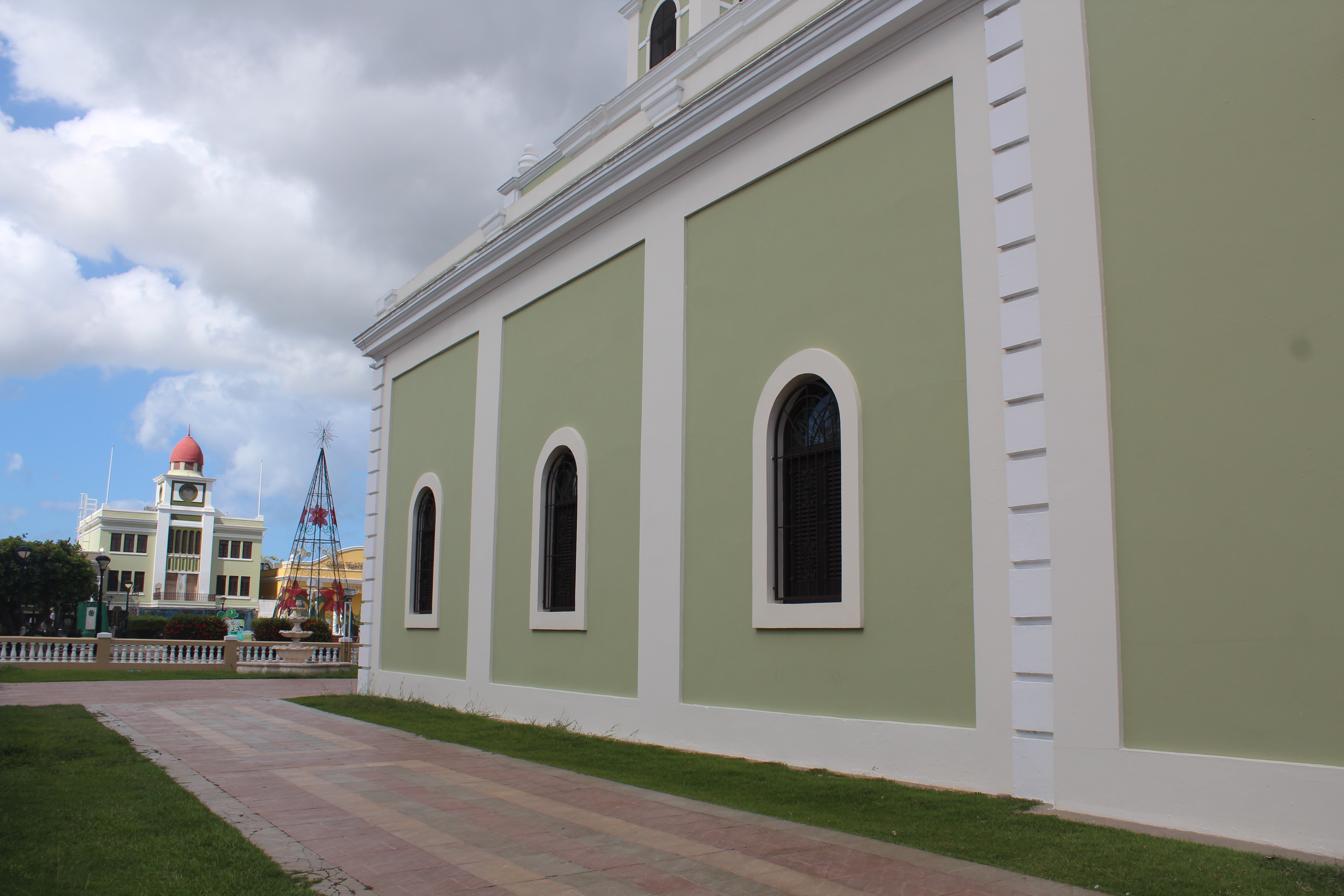
Church building side from Betances Street, city hall in the background, 2023.

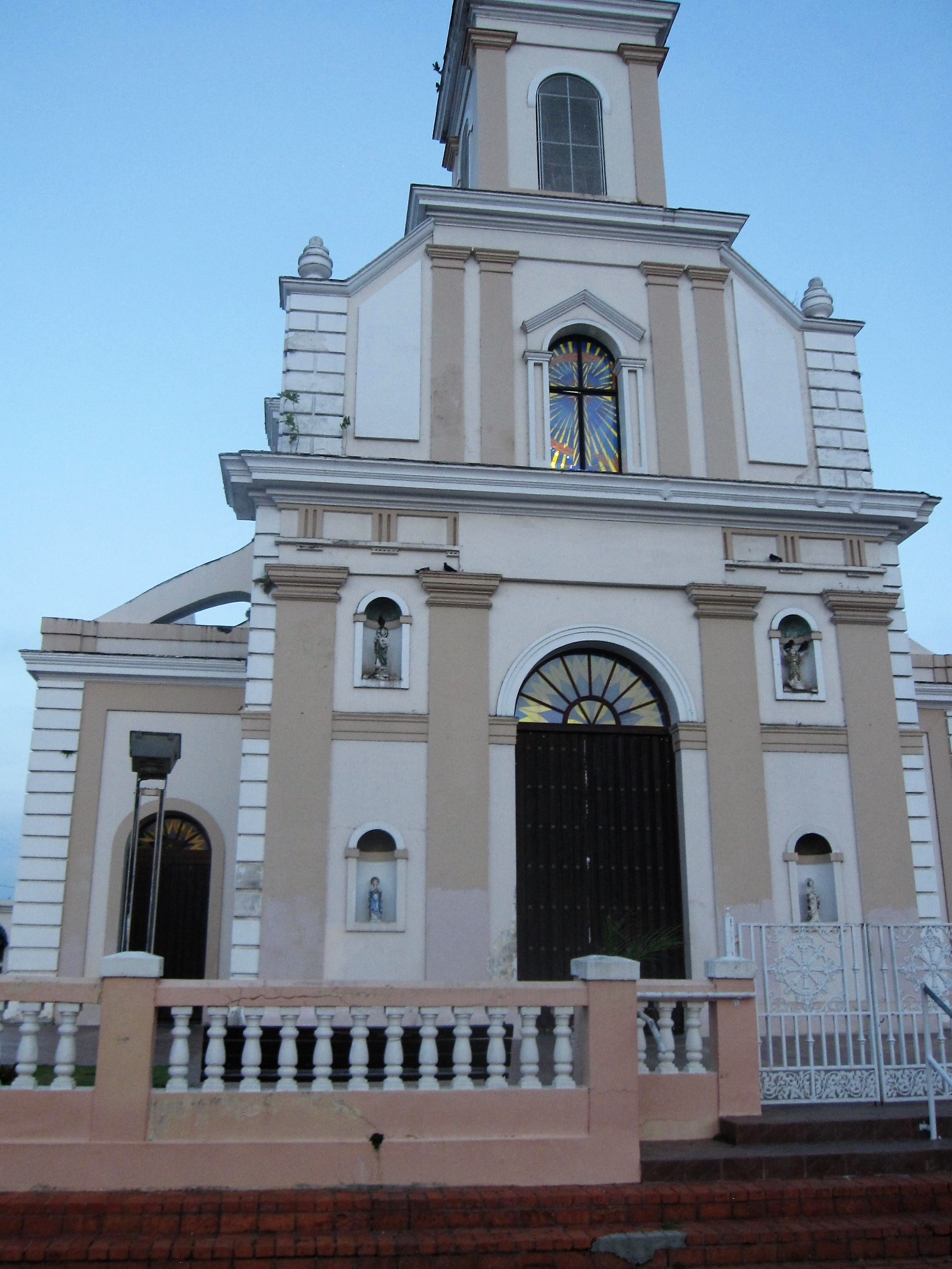
Church façade in 2019.
