= Lonzo Bullie =

American football player and coach (born 1947)

Biographical details
- Born: October 24, 1947 (age 79)

Playing career
- 1967–1968: Tuskegee
- Position: Defensive back

Coaching career (HC unless noted)
- 1971–1980: Kentucky State (assistant)
- 1981–1983: Tuskegee
- 1984–1989: Knoxville

Head coaching record
- Overall: 48–35–2

Lonzo Bullie (born October 24, 1947) is an American former college football coach. He served as the head football coach at Tuskegee University in Tuskegee, Alabama from 1981 to 1983 and Knoxville College in Knoxville, Tennessee from 1984 to 1989.

== Coaching career ==
Bullie was the 12th head football coach at Tuskegee University in Tuskegee, Alabama, serving for three seasons, from 1981 to 1983. His record at Tuskegee was 19–13.

== Later life ==
Bullie remained in the Tuskegee community and is now the principal of Tuskegee Institute Middle School in Tuskegee, Alabama.

== Head coaching record ==
Year	Team	Overall	Conference	Standing	Bowl/playoffs
Tuskegee Golden Tigers (Southern Intercollegiate Athletic Conference) (1981–1983)
1981	Tuskegee	8–3			
1982	Tuskegee	6–4	5–3		
1983	Tuskegee	5–6	5–3		
Tuskegee:		19–13			
Knoxville Bulldogs (Southern Intercollegiate Athletic Conference) (1984–1988)
1984	Knoxville	4–3–1			
1985	Knoxville	5–5	2–3		
1986	Knoxville	8–1	5–0		
1987	Knoxville	7–1	5–0		
1988	Knoxville	4–4–1			
1989	Knoxville	1–8	0–6	7th	
Knoxville:		29–22–2			
Total:		48–35–2			
