= Laguna Tortuguero Nature Reserve =

Nature reserve in Puerto Rico

- Reserva Natural Laguna Tortuguero
- IUCN category Ib (wilderness area)
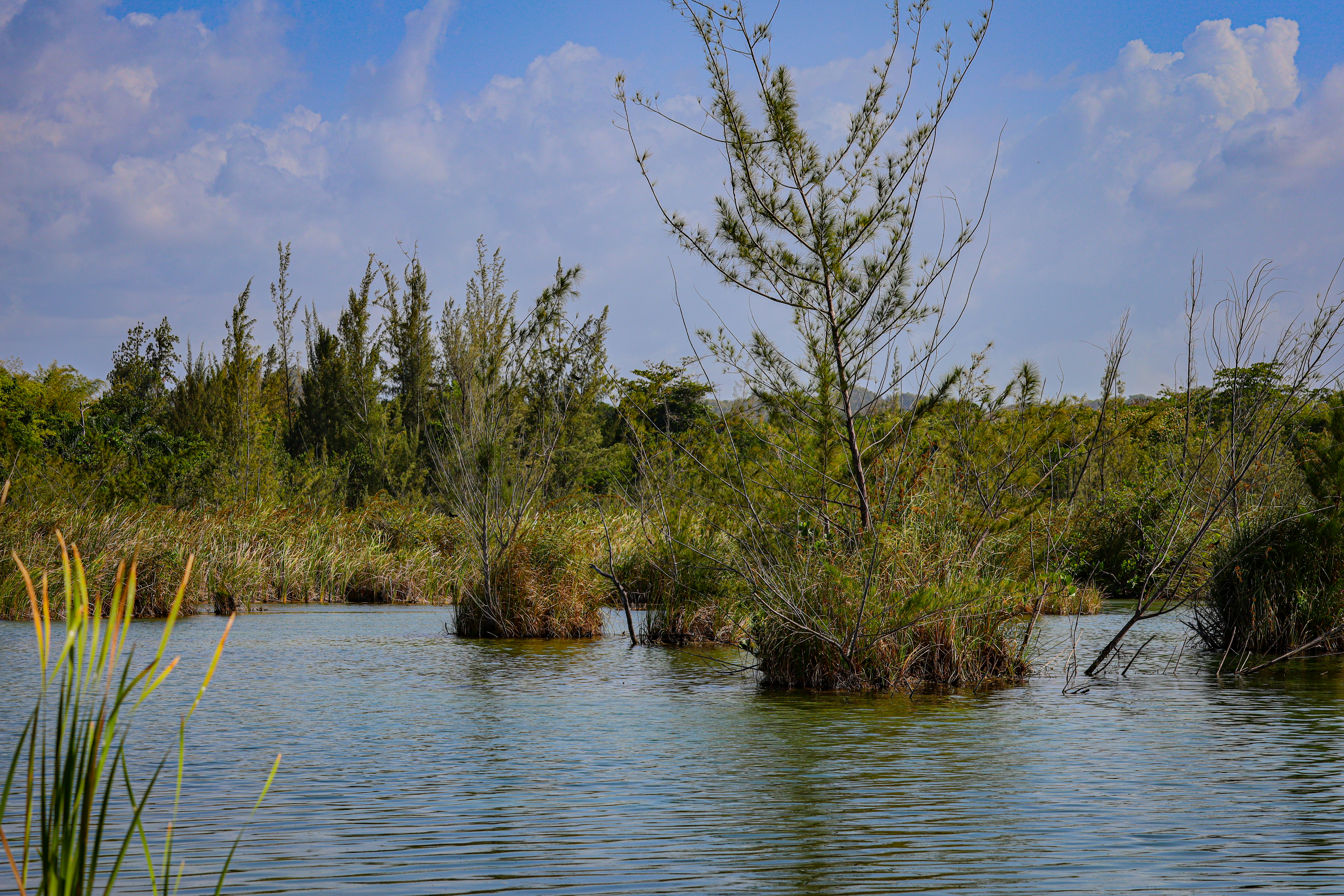
- Tortuguero Lagoon

- Location within Puerto Rico
- Location: Manatí and Vega Baja, Puerto Rico
- Nearest city: Vega Baja
- Coordinates: 18.46°N 66.44°W
- Area: 3,577 cda (3,474 acres; 1,406 ha)
- Established: 1979
- Governing body: Puerto Rico Department of Natural and Environmental Resources (DRNA)

Laguna Tortuguero Nature Reserve (Spanish: Reserva Natural Laguna Tortuguero) is a nature reserve which protects Tortuguero Lagoon (Laguna Tortuguero), the largest freshwater lagoon in Puerto Rico, and its surrounding wetlands, coastal habitats, mogotes, and secondary forests. Established by the Puerto Rico Planning Board in 1979 at former farmlands, the nature reserve today attracts many visitors interested in kayaking, fishing and birdwatching, and due to its number of hiking and mountain bike trails.

== Geography ==
Laguna Tortuguero Nature Reserve is centered around Tortuguero Lagoon, the largest freshwater lagoon in Puerto Rico and, along with Cartagena Lagoon, one of the two of its kind in the island. The lagoon itself is surrounded by other smaller lagoons, such as Laguna Rica (Laguna Rica), and other naturally occurring ponds, swamps and springs that emanate from the large aquifer system of the Northern Puerto Rico karst region, particularly the Aymamón Limestone formation. This large northern aquifer is also known as the Superior Aquifer (Acuífero Superior) of Puerto Rico.

The protected area itself, comprising a total of 3,474 acres (1,406 ha), spreads through the barrio of Tierras Nuevas Saliente in the municipality of Manatí, and the barrios of Algarrobo, Puerto Nuevo and Yeguada in the municipality of Vega Baja.

== History ==
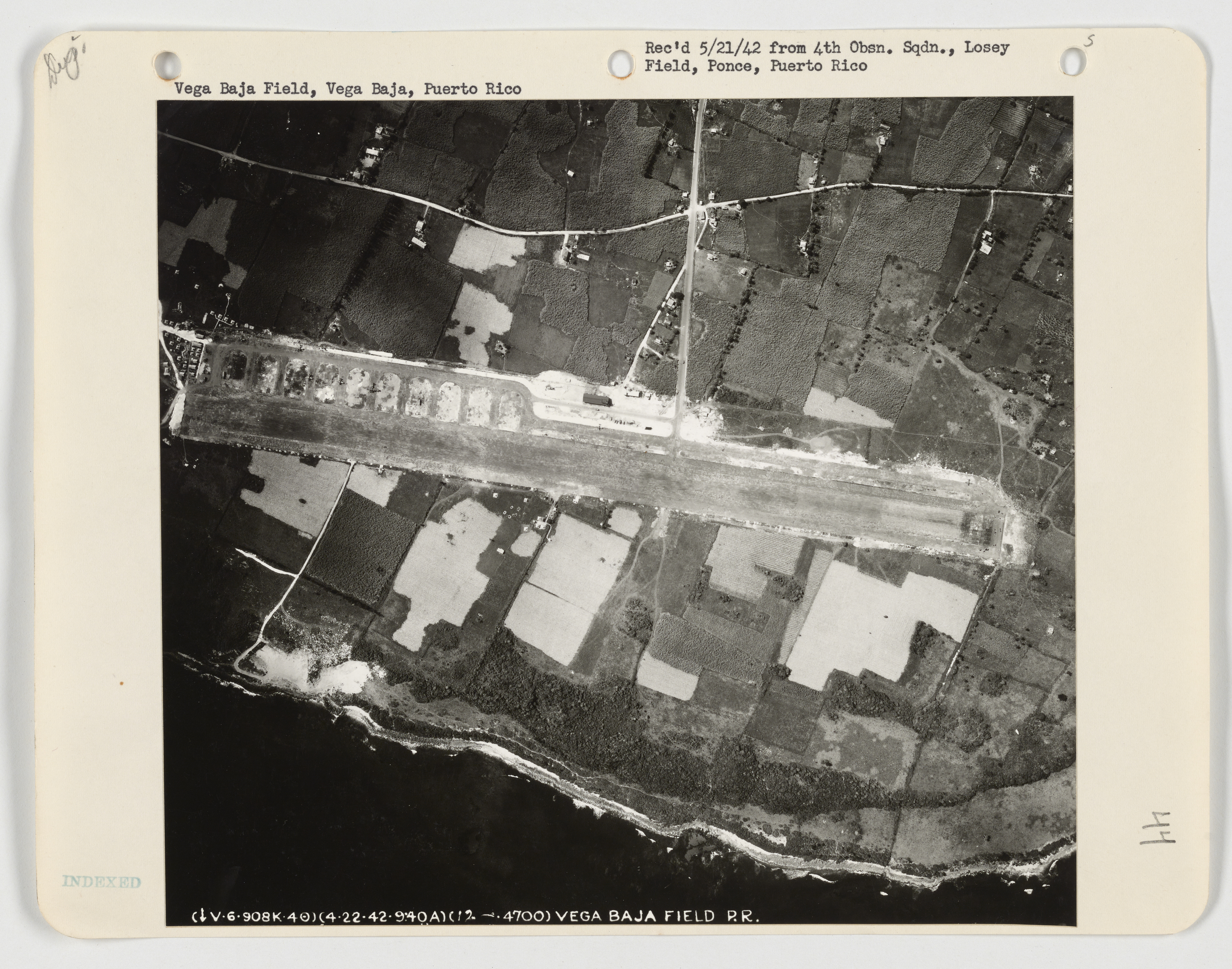
Camp Tortuguero airstrip

The area around the lagoon has served as farmland since the arrival of the Spanish to Puerto Rico. Sugarcane quickly became the main crop along the coast east to the protected area today, with plantations and refineries such as San Vicente appearing during the 19th and early 20th centuries. Although the lagoon itself was not exploited as other similar bodies of water elsewhere in Puerto Rico, its surrounding forests were torn down to make way for grazing lands and crops. In the advent of the Second World War, the area became the home to Camp Tortuguero, one of the sites where the reorganization of the Puerto Rico National Guard took place. An airstrip, small fire arms range and barracks where built and expanded in the between the Second World War and the Korean War, and their remnants can still be found within the area. Ruins of a National Guard waste incinerator can also be found southeast of the lagoon. Between 1979 and 1980, Campo Tortuguero moved to its current location just south of the protected area.

Laguna Tortuguero Nature Reserve was first established as a coastal reserve as part of the Coastal Zone Management Program by the Puerto Rico Planning Board in 1979. Today it is managed by the Puerto Rico Department of Natural and Environmental Resources (Departamento de Recursos Naturales y Ambientales de Puerto Rico, DRNA), while local infrastructure peripheral to the reserve is managed by the municipal governments of Manatí and Vega Baja.

== Ecology ==
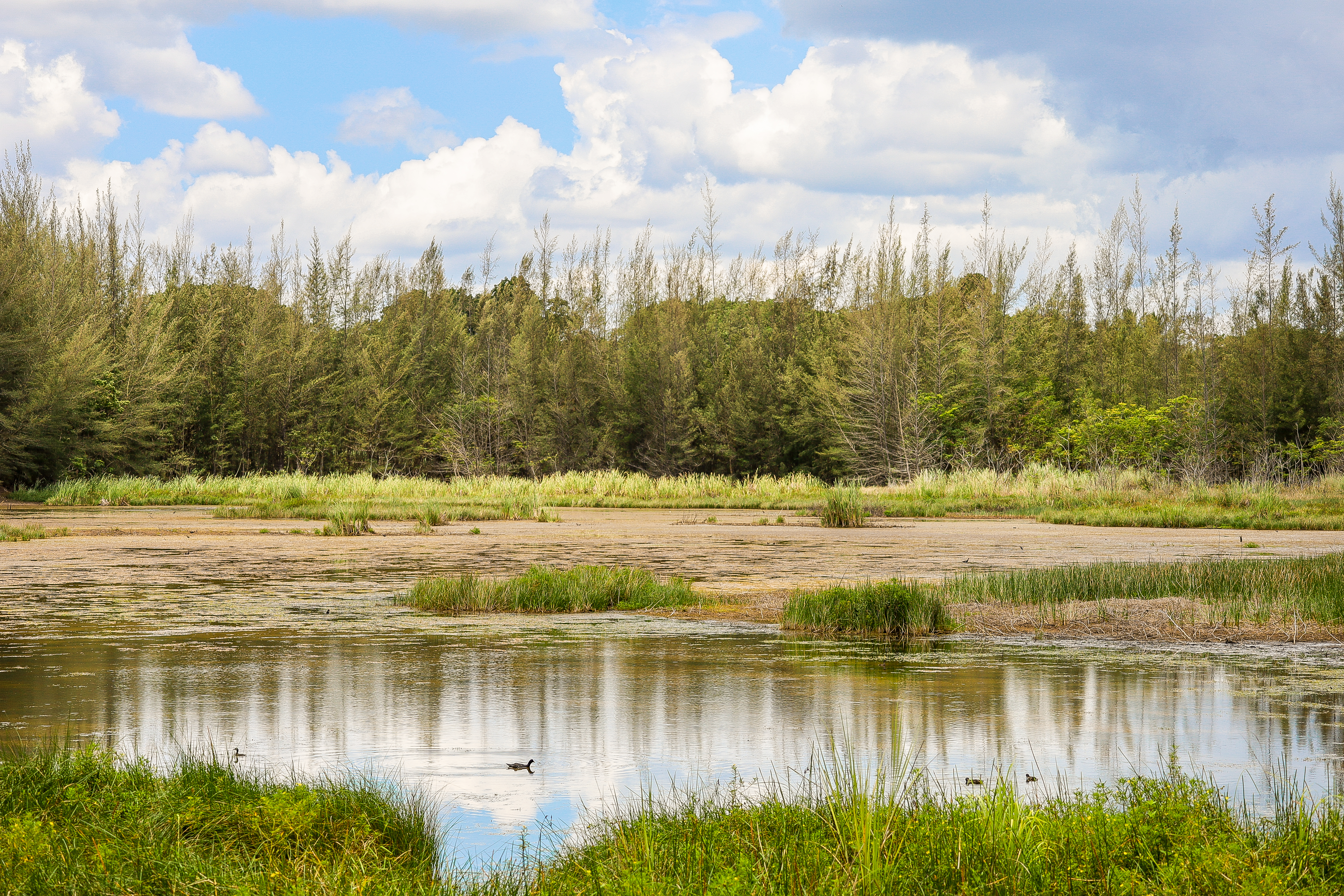
Laguna Rica

The nature reserve represents a natural oasis among the rapid urban and agricultural development along the northern coast of Puerto Rico and as such is home to a relatively high diversity of animal and plant life.

Laguna Tortuguero is home to at least 144 rare species, seven of which are carnivorous and two of which are endemic to Puerto Rico. With 717 identified plant species, this reserve has been described as the fourth most important protected area for plant diversity in Puerto Rico. The reserve also protects Utricularia subulata and Drosera capillaris, two plant species that are endangered in Puerto Rico. The extremely rare tree Schoepfia arenaria was found to growing in the reserve in 1990. Less than 200 of these Puerto Rican endemic trees are known to exist.

Some of the native fish in the lagoon include eels, chads and snooks. Native fauna in the reserve includes anoles, ospreys, ibises, night herons, ruddy ducks (Oxyura jamaicensis), American coots (Fulica americana), mangrove cuckoos (Coccyzus minor), Puerto Rican racers (Borikenophis portoricensis), Central Antillean sliders (Trachemys stejnegeri). The endemic Puerto Rican boa (Chilabothrus inornatus), Puerto Rican galliwasp (Diploglossus pleii), Puerto Rican woodpecker (Melanerpes portoricensis), Puerto Rican spindalis (Spindalis portoricensis), Puerto Rican oriole (Icterus portoricensis), Puerto Rican lizard cuckoo (Coccyzus vieilloti) and Adelaide's warbler (Setophaga adelaidae) also occur within the boundaries of the reserve. As with other parts of the archipelago, the reserve faces great challenges with the introduction of exotic and invasive species. Due to the lack of ecological competition, invasive species like green iguanas, Cuban tree frogs, pond sliders and spectacled caimans are very common in the reserve. Spectacled caimans (Caiman crocodilus) particularly represent a rapidly growing threat in the ecosystem, and Laguna Tortuguero today is home to one of the largest populations of this invasive crocodilian in Puerto Rico.

== Recreation ==
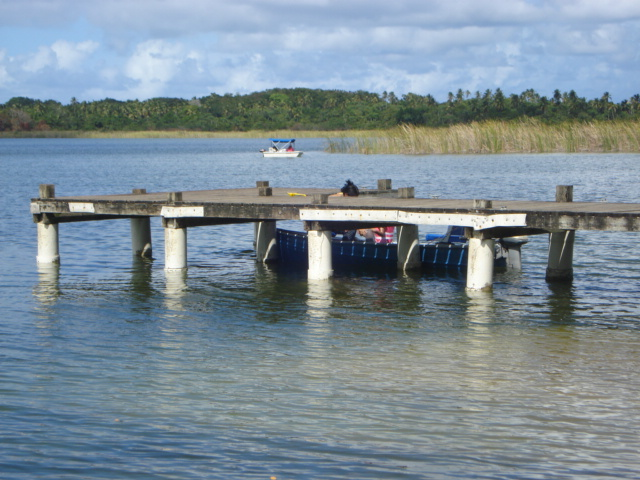
Docks at Tortuguero Lagoon

Laguna Tortuguero Nature Reserve offers a large variety of activities to visitors, among them hiking, mountain biking, canoeing and kayaking. Although swimming is not permitted in the Tortuguero Lagoon (nor advised due to its limestone quicksand-like bottom and the presence of caimans), the Tortuguero and Guayaney Springs are open to swimming. While located within the boundaries of the reserve, Los Tubos Beach in Manatí is a dangerous beach for swimming due to unpredictable currents and the powerful waves of the Atlantic Ocean. Tortuguero is also popular for birdwatching, particularly during the migration months. Mountain biking particularly is another popular activity in the reserve, which offers numerous trails, some of which feature rare white silica sand. Los Tubos MTB Trail offers additional mountain biking trails along the coastal portion of the reserve.

Access to the nature reserve is possible through the DRNA docks in the western shorn of Tortuguero Lagoon and the Tortuguero Recreation Area (Área Recreativa Tortuguero) managed by the municipality of Vega Baja on route PR-687, while PR-686 offers access to Los Tubos Beach and the coastal portions of the reserve.

== See also ==
- Caño Tiburones
- Laguna Cartagena National Wildlife Refuge
