= Pomasia denticlathrata =

Scientific classification
- Kingdom: Animalia
- Phylum: Arthropoda
- Clade: Pancrustacea
- Class: Insecta
- Order: Lepidoptera
- Family: Geometridae
- Genus: Pomasia
- Species: P. denticlathrata

Binomial name
- Pomasia denticlathrata Warren, 1893

Species of moth

Pomasia denticlathrata is a moth in the family Geometridae first described by William Warren in 1893. It is found in India (it was described from the Naga Hills), Japan and Taiwan.

The wingspan is about 18 to 21 millimetres (0.71 to 0.83 in). Adults are pale yellow, the forewings with about fifteen waved red-brown lines connected by patches of red brown. The hindwings have about eight waved red-brown lines. Both wings have a waved marginal line.

The larvae have been recorded feeding on Schoepfia species.
