= Schoepfia multiflora =

Conservation status
- Near Threatened (IUCN 2.3)

Scientific classification
- Kingdom: Plantae
- Clade: Tracheophytes
- Clade: Angiosperms
- Clade: Eudicots
- Order: Santalales
- Family: Schoepfiaceae
- Genus: Schoepfia
- Species: S. multiflora

Binomial name
- Schoepfia multiflora Urb.

Species of flowering plant

Schoepfia multiflora is a species of flowering plant in the Schoepfiaceae family. It is a smallish tree, growing six to eight metres tall, exceptionally to ten metres. It is endemic to Jamaica, where it grows on rocky limestone in the woodlands of the central region.

Schoepfia multiflora was first described as a new species by Ignatz Urban in the 1907 volume of the Symbolae Antillanae.

In the 1984 key by Hermann Otto Sleumer, Schoepfia multiflora, S. harrisii and S. vacciniifolia are the only American Schoepfia species which have some or all flowers possessing tiny pedicels - all other species have sessile flowers which sit directly on top of the short peduncles. S. harrisii is also a Jamaican endemic, whereas S. vacciniifolia is a species from Central America.
