= Pomasia nuriae =

Scientific classification
- Kingdom: Animalia
- Phylum: Arthropoda
- Clade: Pancrustacea
- Class: Insecta
- Order: Lepidoptera
- Family: Geometridae
- Genus: Pomasia
- Species: P. nuriae

Binomial name
- Pomasia nuriae Holloway, 1997

Species of moth

Pomasia nuriae is a moth in the family Geometridae. It is found on Borneo and possibly Peninsular Malaysia. The habitat consists of lowland areas.

The length of the forewings is 7–8 mm.
