= Pomasia psylaria =

Scientific classification
- Kingdom: Animalia
- Phylum: Arthropoda
- Class: Insecta
- Order: Lepidoptera
- Family: Geometridae
- Genus: Pomasia
- Species: P. psylaria

Binomial name
- Pomasia psylaria Guenee, 1857

Species of moth

Pomasia psylaria is a moth in the family Geometridae. It is found in Sri Lanka.

== Description ==
Its wingspan is about 28 mm in the male and 32 mm in the female. Body bright rufous. Head, thorax and abdomen banded with greyish white. Forewings with orange costa, with black patches and strigae. A grey fascia found below the costa. A basal grey spot can be seen. There are six irregularly waved grey lines outlined in black. The veins streaked with grey and black. Outer margin orange, with black patches at veins 2 and 4. Hindwings with a basal grey spot. Five waved greyish lines found with black outlines. The outer margin orange, with a black patch at vein 4. Ventral side is suffused with pale fuscous.
