= Pomasia lacunaria =

Scientific classification
- Kingdom: Animalia
- Phylum: Arthropoda
- Clade: Pancrustacea
- Class: Insecta
- Order: Lepidoptera
- Family: Geometridae
- Genus: Pomasia
- Species: P. lacunaria

Binomial name
- Pomasia lacunaria Holloway, 1997

Species of moth

Pomasia lacunaria is a moth in the family Geometridae. It is found on Borneo and Peninsular Malaysia. The habitat consists of lowland forests.

The length of the forewings is about 8 mm.
