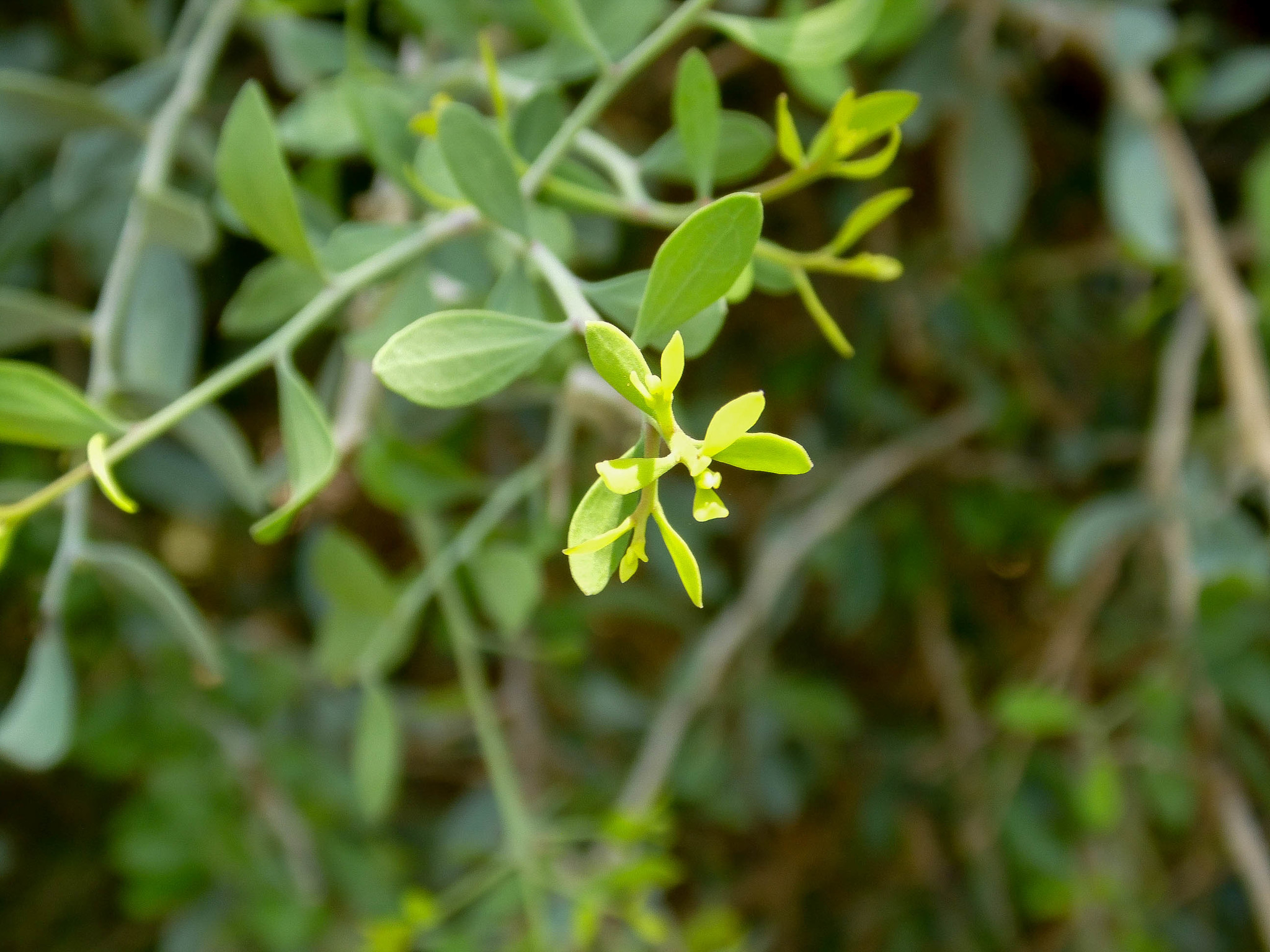

Scientific classification
- Kingdom: Plantae
- Clade: Tracheophytes
- Clade: Angiosperms
- Clade: Eudicots
- Order: Santalales
- Family: Schoepfiaceae
- Genus: Schoepfia
- Species: S. californica

Binomial name
- Schoepfia californica Brandegee

= Schoepfia californica =

Species of flowering plant

Schoepfia californica is a species of flowering plant in the Schoepfiaceae commonly known as the California schoepfia, iguajil, and candelillo. It is a large shrub or small tree with grayish bark, smooth turquoise-colored leaves, and small red flowers. It is endemic to the Baja California peninsula, and is commonly found in desert flats, slopes, and washes in an area from the Bahia de Los Angeles to the Cape region at the tip of the peninsula.

== Description ==
This species grows as a large shrub to small tree 8 to 10 ft (2.4 to 3.0 m) high. The branches are rigid and diverge widely, with the young branches minutely pubescent, while the older branches have smooth, grayish bark with white fissures. The leaves are arranged alternately, and are usually vertical due to a twist at their base. On the abaxial surface of the leaf are 3 faint ribs. The leaves are shaped obovate with smooth margins (not serrated), and covered with a glaucous layer, giving them a turquoise coloration.

From February to April, small, urn-shaped red flowers appear on the plant. The perianth is reddish-yellow, and is 3 to 8 mm (0.12 to 0.31 in) long. There are 4 to 5 petal lobes. The stamens are equal in number to the lobes of the perianth and placed opposite to them. The flowers transform into a fleshy, ovoid fruit about 6 mm (0.24 in) long that appears similar to a grape when mature. The bony seed below the fleshy fruit is covered in dark longitudinal lines.

This species was described by American botanist Townshend Stith Brandegee in 1889.

== Distribution and habitat ==
This species is endemic to the Baja California peninsula. It is distributed from the region near Santa Rosalillita and Bahia de Los Angeles in southern Baja California state south to the end of the peninsula, the Cape region of Baja California Sur. It is usually found growing in desert flats, slopes, and washes.

Two other congeners occur in the region; S. schreberi, and S. shreveana, both of which are very rare.
