= Pomasia galastis =

Scientific classification
- Kingdom: Animalia
- Phylum: Arthropoda
- Class: Insecta
- Order: Lepidoptera
- Family: Geometridae
- Genus: Pomasia
- Species: P. galastis

Binomial name
- Pomasia galastis Meyrick, 1897

Species of moth

Pomasia galastis is a moth in the family Geometridae. It is found in the north-eastern Himalayas and on Borneo. The habitat consists of forests, including secondary forests, from lowland areas to altitudes of about 1,700 meters.
