= Pomasia salutaris =

Scientific classification
- Kingdom: Animalia
- Phylum: Arthropoda
- Clade: Pancrustacea
- Class: Insecta
- Order: Lepidoptera
- Family: Geometridae
- Genus: Pomasia
- Species: P. salutaris

Binomial name
- Pomasia salutaris Prout, 1929

Synonyms
- Pomasia vernacularia salutaris Prout, 1929

Species of moth

Pomasia salutaris is a moth in the family Geometridae. It is found on Sumatra, Peninsular Malaysia and Borneo. The habitat consists of the upper montane zone up to altitudes of 2,110 meters.
