= Schoepfia harrisii =

Conservation status
- Vulnerable (IUCN 2.3)

Scientific classification
- Kingdom: Plantae
- Clade: Tracheophytes
- Clade: Angiosperms
- Clade: Eudicots
- Order: Santalales
- Family: Schoepfiaceae
- Genus: Schoepfia
- Species: S. harrisii

Binomial name
- Schoepfia harrisii Urb.

Species of flowering plant

Schoepfia harrisii is a species of flowering plant in the Schoepfiaceae family. It is a small tree or shrub, growing two to five metres tall. It is endemic to Jamaica, where it is only known to occur in the parishes of Trelawny and Clarendon, in what is known as Cockpit Country, a region of many steep, rounded, limestone hills, shaped like an egg-carton. Here it grows on crags in moist woodland, between 600 and 900m in elevation.

== Description ==
It is a small tree or large shrub, growing two to five metres tall. In Hermann Otto Sleumer's 1984 monograph on the Neotropical species of Schoepfia he writes that it can exceptionally grow to ten metres, however he may have been confusing the issue with data garnered from a specimen of S. obovata, a species which was first discovered to grow on the island in 1982, when it was found that an earlier found specimen of S. obovata had been misidentified as S. harrisii. George Proctor describes S. harrisii as a "straggling or even scrambling shrub", as opposed to a tree. The first specimen was collected by Harris from a shrub which was 15ft high. The young stems are stout, and become covered in whitish-grey cork at a young age, but the old branches are relatively slender, old branches and main stems growing a thick layer of corky bark.

The leaves then to be variable in shape; they have been described as lanceolate, elliptic or lanceolate-ovate, and sometimes inequilateral; or obovate-oblong or ovate-oblong to oblong-lanceolate, sometimes subobovate-lanceolate. Although most leaves gradually taper to end in a blunt, rounded or even flat apex, they are sometimes bluntly acuminate. The base of the leaves is broadly cuneate to rounded, and then attenuates into a short petiole, 4-8mm in length and about 1.5mm wide. The leaves are up to 11.5cm in length and are usually 2-4cm broad, but usually smaller. The leaf margins are flattish. The leaves are leathery, not really tuberculate and brittle (when dry?) in texture and coloured yellowish-green to pale olive; they are rather dull in colour when dry. The midrib is somewhat raised on both sides of the leaf, and from it 3-4 pairs of lateral veins curved quite steeply towards the apex, sometimes faintly looping before they reach the margin. These veins are slightly or hardly raised on both sides. There is no vein reticulation.

Schoepfia harrisii is a generally cauliflorous species, bearing most of the inflorescences on older stems, although some may incidentally appear in the leaf axils of the young, still leaved stems. There are one to two, sometimes three, glabrous inflorescences at each axil. These inflorescences are rather basic in form, consisting of a short 1-1.5cm long peduncle topped by two flowers, rarely one or three. The flower buds are rounded. The flowers have 1-2mm long pedicels and usually six petals, sometimes five. The flower (the corolla specifically) is believed to be greenish-yellow in colour, but Sleumer notes in 1984 that none of the specimens were in anthesis, only in bud. The 1mm epicalyx (sometimes mistaken for a calyx) is separate from the flower, not adnate to it. The epicalyx is itself composed of adnate bracts and bracteoles, welded into a cup with a very shallowly sinuously lobed and obscurely ciliated margin. The stigma has three lobes.

Its fruit are ellipsoid-shaped drupes, 7-8mm long and 5-6mm wide. The fruit are bright red, or light red. The top (end) of the fruit is glabrous.

=== Similar species ===
In the 1984 key by Sleumer, Schoepfia harrisii, S. multiflora and S. vacciniifolia are the only American Schoepfia species which have some or all flowers possessing tiny pedicels - all other species have sessile flowers which sit directly on top of the short peduncles. S. multiflora is also a Jamaican endemic, whereas S. vacciniifolia is a species from Central America.

The island of Jamaica boasts four species of Schoepfia: the endemics S. harrisii and S. multiflora, and S. obovata and S. schreberi (formerly known as S. angustata and S. chrysophylloides on the island), with broader distributions throughout the Caribbean. S. obovata has been misidentified as S. harrisii in the past. This species usually grows at lower elevations; occurs in dry habitats as opposed to moist; has smaller, more regularly shaped leaves which are always blunt at their apexes and have 1-3mm petioles; becomes an erect-growing tree as opposed to a bush; and has yellow to dull red fruits. Proctor considers S. obovata to never be cauliflorous (but Sleumer disagrees).

== Taxonomy ==
Schoepfia harrisii was first collected by William Harris, a government botanist, near the village of Troy at the turn of the 19th century. This specimen was then described as a novel species by Ignatz Urban in the 1907 volume of the Symbolae Antillanae, and became the holotype for the new species.

It is now classified in a small botanical family, the Schoepfiaceae, having previously been considered included in the Olacaceae.

== Distribution ==
It is endemic to Jamaica, where it is only known to occur in two parishes, southernmost Trelawny and northern Clarendon, in what is known as Cockpit Country. Specifically, it occurs in scattered locations in Cockpit Country around the northwestern perimeter of the central mountains.

== Ecology ==
Sleumer states the species can be found at altitudes of 150-915m in 1984, but this may be due to confusion with a misidentified specimen of S. obovata, which was collected near the southern coast. Proctor, whose specimen it was which was misidentified, gives 'revised' altitudes of 2,000–3,000 feet (610–910 m) in 1982, which is followed by Kelly in 1998.

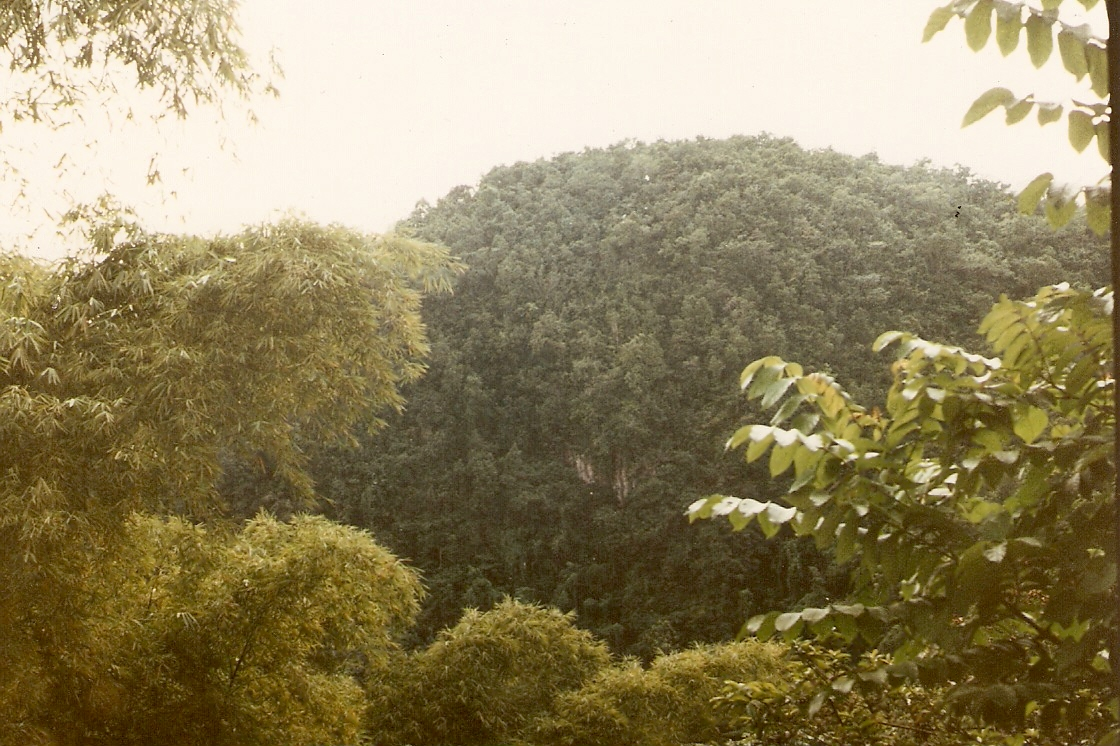
Cockpit Country

It is only found in Cockpit Country, a karst landscape, a region of many steep, rounded, limestone hills, shaped like a vast egg-carton. Here it grows on crags in moist woodland. It probably blooms in midwinter.

== Conservation ==
An initiative taken by Daniel L. Kelly in 1988 to assess a large number of Jamaican endemic plants, according to the standards promulgated by the IUCN at the time (Davis et al., 1986), identified this species of tree as 'rare', i.e. not in danger of extinction, but at risk due to a restricted geographical range. The species was added to the IUCN Red List of Threatened Species as 'rare' in 1997 (this assessment has disappeared from the website). Kelly eventually assessed the species as 'vulnerable' for The World List of Threatened Trees in 1998 (according to a new set of criteria of the time), which was eventually incorporated in the Red List website as the official 1998 assessment.
