= Pomasia luteata =

Scientific classification
- Kingdom: Animalia
- Phylum: Arthropoda
- Clade: Pancrustacea
- Class: Insecta
- Order: Lepidoptera
- Family: Geometridae
- Genus: Pomasia
- Species: P. luteata

Binomial name
- Pomasia luteata Holloway, 1997

Species of moth

Pomasia luteata is a moth in the family Geometridae. It is found on Borneo and Peninsular Malaysia. The species is found from lowland areas to the upper montane zone.

The length of the forewings is 9–10 mm.
