= Pomasia vernacularia =

Scientific classification
- Kingdom: Animalia
- Phylum: Arthropoda
- Class: Insecta
- Order: Lepidoptera
- Family: Geometridae
- Genus: Pomasia
- Species: P. vernacularia

Binomial name
- Pomasia vernacularia Guenee, 1858

Species of moth

Pomasia vernacularia is a moth in the family Geometridae. It is found on Borneo.
