= Pomasia euryopis =

Scientific classification
- Kingdom: Animalia
- Phylum: Arthropoda
- Class: Insecta
- Order: Lepidoptera
- Family: Geometridae
- Genus: Pomasia
- Species: P. euryopis

Binomial name
- Pomasia euryopis Meyrick, 1897

Species of moth

Pomasia euryopis is a moth in the family Geometridae. It is found on Borneo and Peninsular Malaysia.
