= Pomasia punctaria =

Scientific classification
- Kingdom: Animalia
- Phylum: Arthropoda
- Class: Insecta
- Order: Lepidoptera
- Family: Geometridae
- Genus: Pomasia
- Species: P. punctaria

Binomial name
- Pomasia punctaria Hampson, 1912

Species of moth

Pomasia punctaria is a moth in the family Geometridae. It is found in India.
