= Pomasia =

Scientific classification
- Kingdom: Animalia
- Phylum: Arthropoda
- Class: Insecta
- Order: Lepidoptera
- Family: Geometridae
- Tribe: Eupitheciini
- Genus: Pomasia; Guenée, 1857

Genus of moths

Pomasia is a genus of moths in the family Geometridae.

== Description ==
Palpi porrect (extending forward), the second joint reaching beyond the short sharp frontal tuft, whereas third joint long and naked. Antennae of male minutely ciliated. Hind tibia with two spur pairs. Forewings with vein 3 from before angle of cell and veins 7 to 9 stalked. Veins 10 and 11 stalked, and vein 10 anastomosing with veins 8,9 to form the areole. Hindwings with vein 3 from before angle of cell. Vein 5 from middle of discocellulars, which are angled and vein 6,7 stalked.

== Species ==
- Pomasia denticlathrata Warren, 1893
- Pomasia euryopis Meyrick, 1897
- Pomasia galastis Meyrick, 1897
- Pomasia lacunaria Holloway, 1997
- Pomasia lamunin Holloway, 1997
- Pomasia luteata Holloway, 1997
- Pomasia nuriae Holloway, 1997
- Pomasia obliterata (Walker, 1866)
- Pomasia parerga Prout, 1941
- Pomasia psylaria Guenée, 1857
- Pomasia punctaria Hampson, 1912
- Pomasia reticulata Hampson, 1895
- Pomasia sacculobata Holloway, 1997
- Pomasia salutaris Prout, 1929
- Pomasia sparsata Hampson, 1902
- Pomasia vernacularia Guenée, 1858

== Status unclear ==
- Pomasia salvata Prout, 1929 (possibly Lobogonia salvata Prout, 1928)
