= Pomasia sparsata =

Scientific classification
- Kingdom: Animalia
- Phylum: Arthropoda
- Class: Insecta
- Order: Lepidoptera
- Family: Geometridae
- Genus: Pomasia
- Species: P. sparsata

Binomial name
- Pomasia sparsata Hampson, 1902

Species of moth

Pomasia sparsata is a moth in the family Geometridae. It is found in India.
