= Pomasia parerga =

Scientific classification
- Kingdom: Animalia
- Phylum: Arthropoda
- Clade: Pancrustacea
- Class: Insecta
- Order: Lepidoptera
- Family: Geometridae
- Genus: Pomasia
- Species: P. parerga

Binomial name
- Pomasia parerga Prout, 1941

Species of moth

Pomasia parerga is a moth in the family Geometridae. It is found in north-eastern India.
