= Pomasia lamunin =

Scientific classification
- Kingdom: Animalia
- Phylum: Arthropoda
- Clade: Pancrustacea
- Class: Insecta
- Order: Lepidoptera
- Family: Geometridae
- Genus: Pomasia
- Species: P. lamunin

Binomial name
- Pomasia lamunin Holloway, 1997

Species of moth

Pomasia lamunin is a moth in the family Geometridae. It is found on Borneo. The species is found from lowland areas to the lower montane zone.

The length of the forewings is about 8 mm.
