= Pomasia sacculobata =

Scientific classification
- Kingdom: Animalia
- Phylum: Arthropoda
- Clade: Pancrustacea
- Class: Insecta
- Order: Lepidoptera
- Family: Geometridae
- Genus: Pomasia
- Species: P. sacculobata

Binomial name
- Pomasia sacculobata Holloway, 1997

Species of moth

Pomasia sacculobata is a moth in the family Geometridae. It is found on Peninsular Malaysia and Borneo.

The length of the forewings is 9–10 mm.
