= Piñones State Forest =

State forest in Puerto Rico

Piñones State Forest Bosque Estatal de Piñones
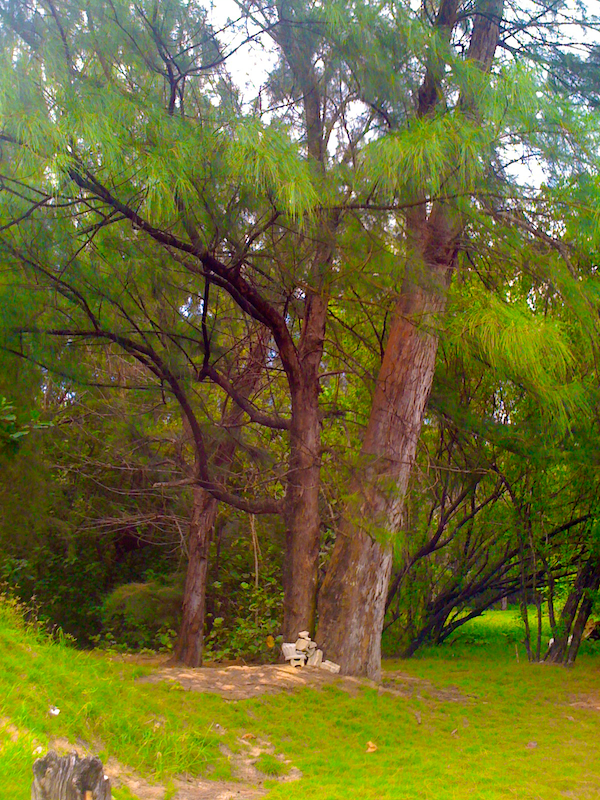

- Location within Puerto Rico
- Interactive map of Piñones State Forest

Geography
- Location: Loiza, Puerto Rico
- Coordinates: 18°26′38″N 65°57′59″W

Administration
- Authority: Puerto Rico Department of Natural and Environmental Resources

Piñones State Forest, (in Spanish: Bosque Estatal de Piñones), and named after the Casuarina, locally called Piñones (after an invasive species of salt-tolerant tree from Australia used for lumber), is a timberland forest near one of the longest beaches in Puerto Rico. It is located in Torrecilla Baja barrio in the municipality of Loíza. It is a tourist attraction and is managed by the Puerto Rico Department of Natural and Environmental Resources.

== Geographical location ==
Home of a mangrove forest, Piñones is a natural reserve located east of Isla Verde north of Luis Muñoz Marín International Airport. It is operated by the Puerto Rico Department of Natural and Environmental Resources and located in Loiza.

== Flora and fauna ==
The extremely rare tree Schoepfia arenaria grows here at a place called Punta Maldonado. Less than 200 of these Puerto Rican endemic trees are known to exist.

== The Piñones Trail ==
There is a boardwalk and trail used for biking and walking through parts of the forest. Several agencies carefully manage the Piñones Trail (in Spanish: Paseo Piñones), so as to avoid disturbing sensitive ecological and archaeological points, while still encouraging "family-type" visits. In 2001, the trail received an award from the Federal Highway Administration for excellence in non-motorized transportation.

== Activities nearby ==
Near the forest is a beach called Playa Aviones and kiosks including, Kiosko El Boricua on PR-187 mentioned by the Puerto Rico Tourism Company.

== Gallery ==
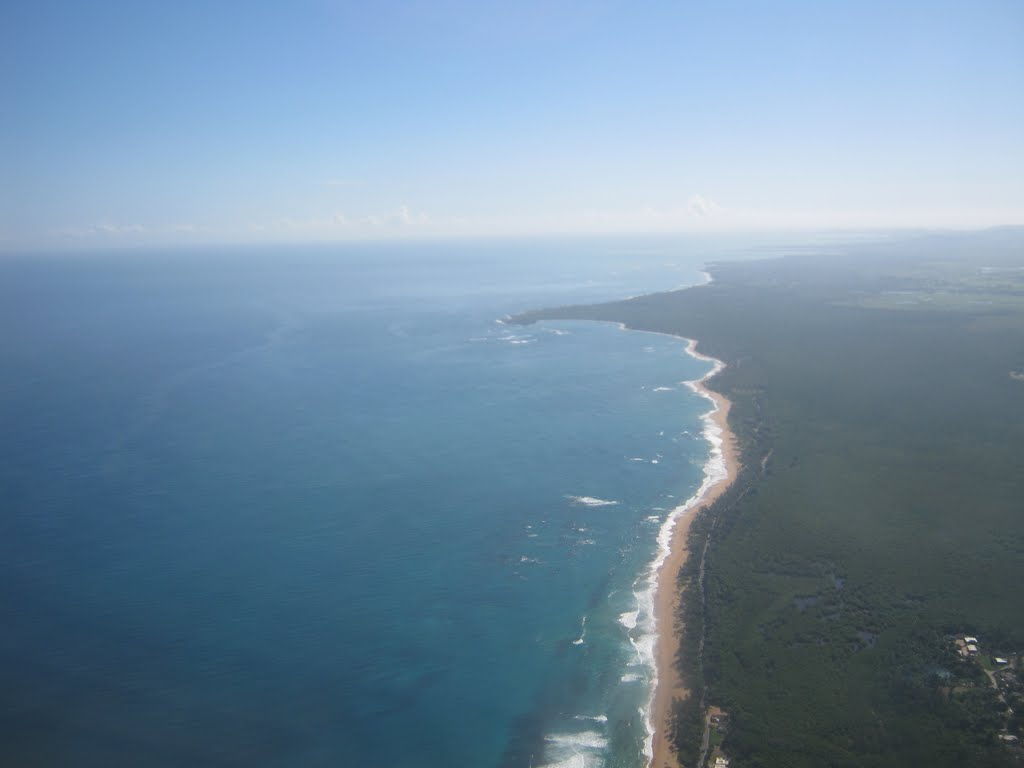

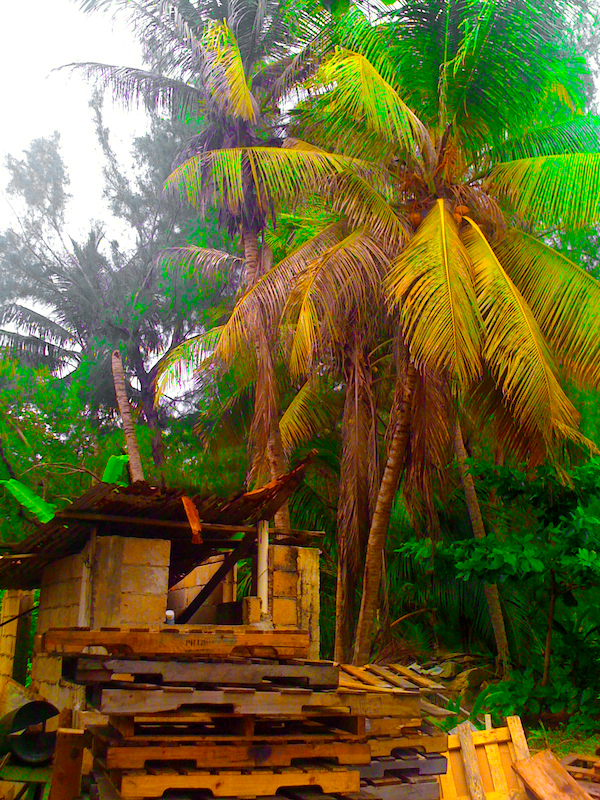

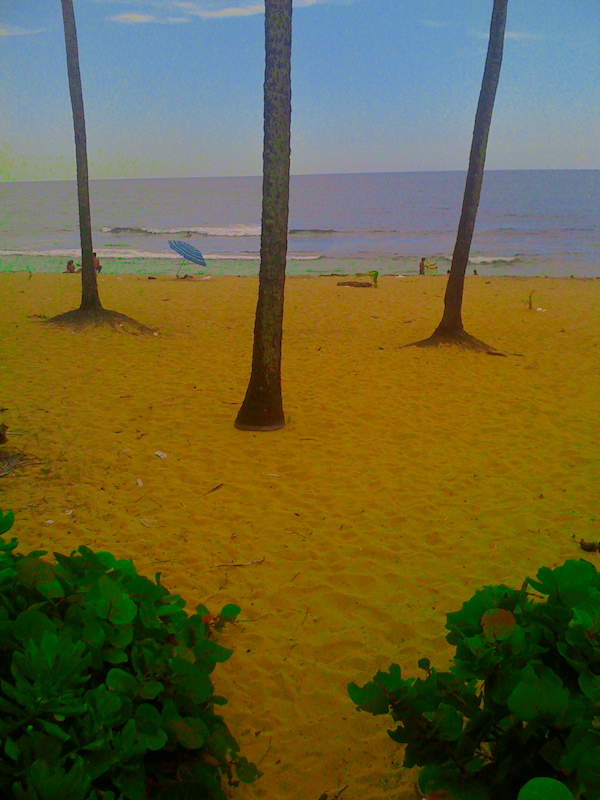
Playa Aviones on PR-187

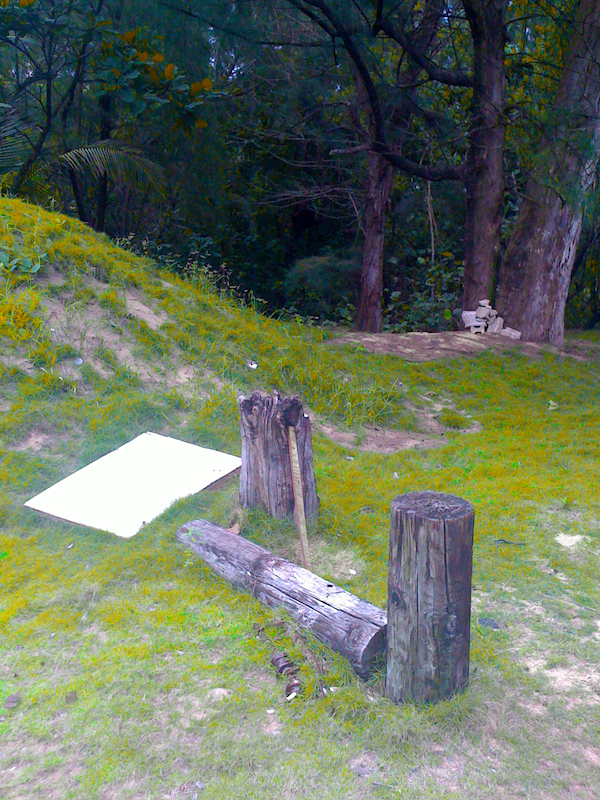

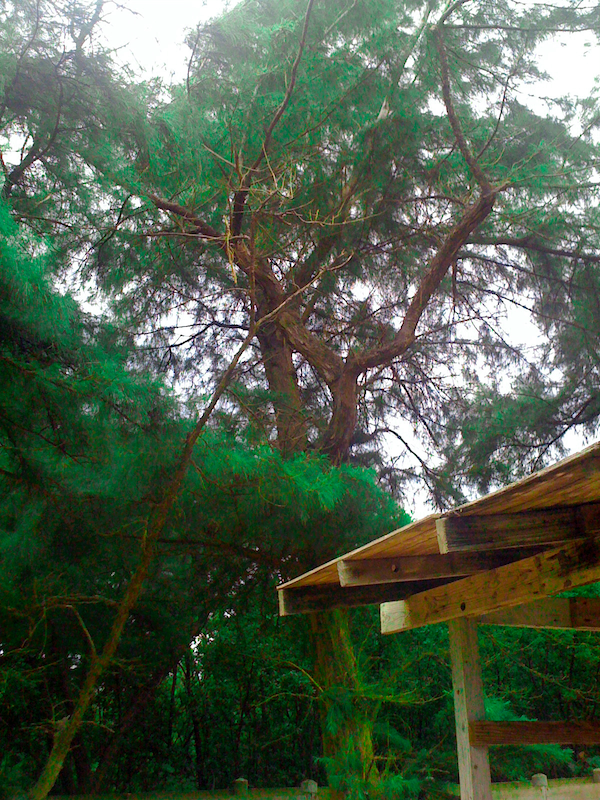

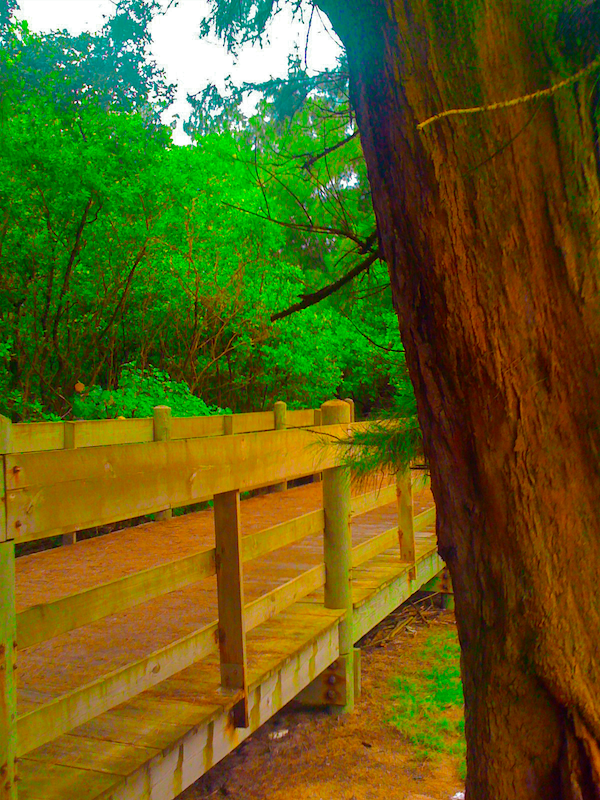

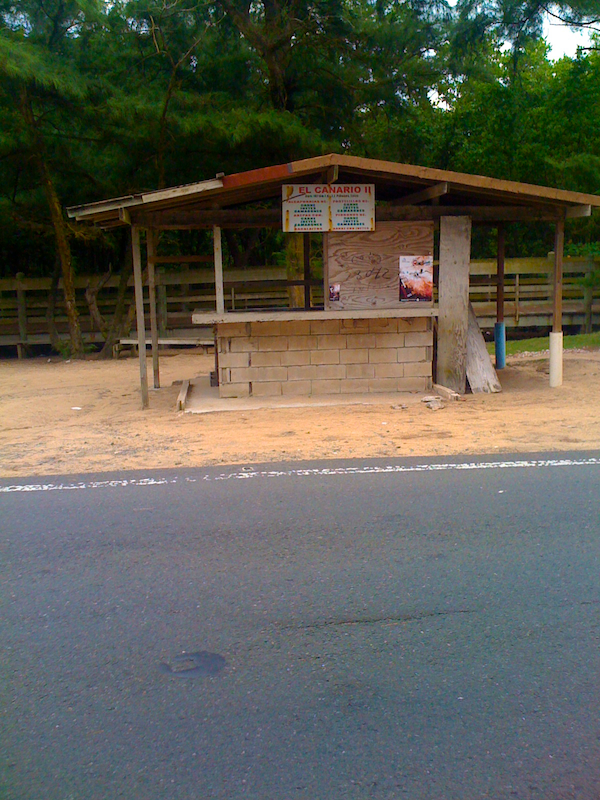

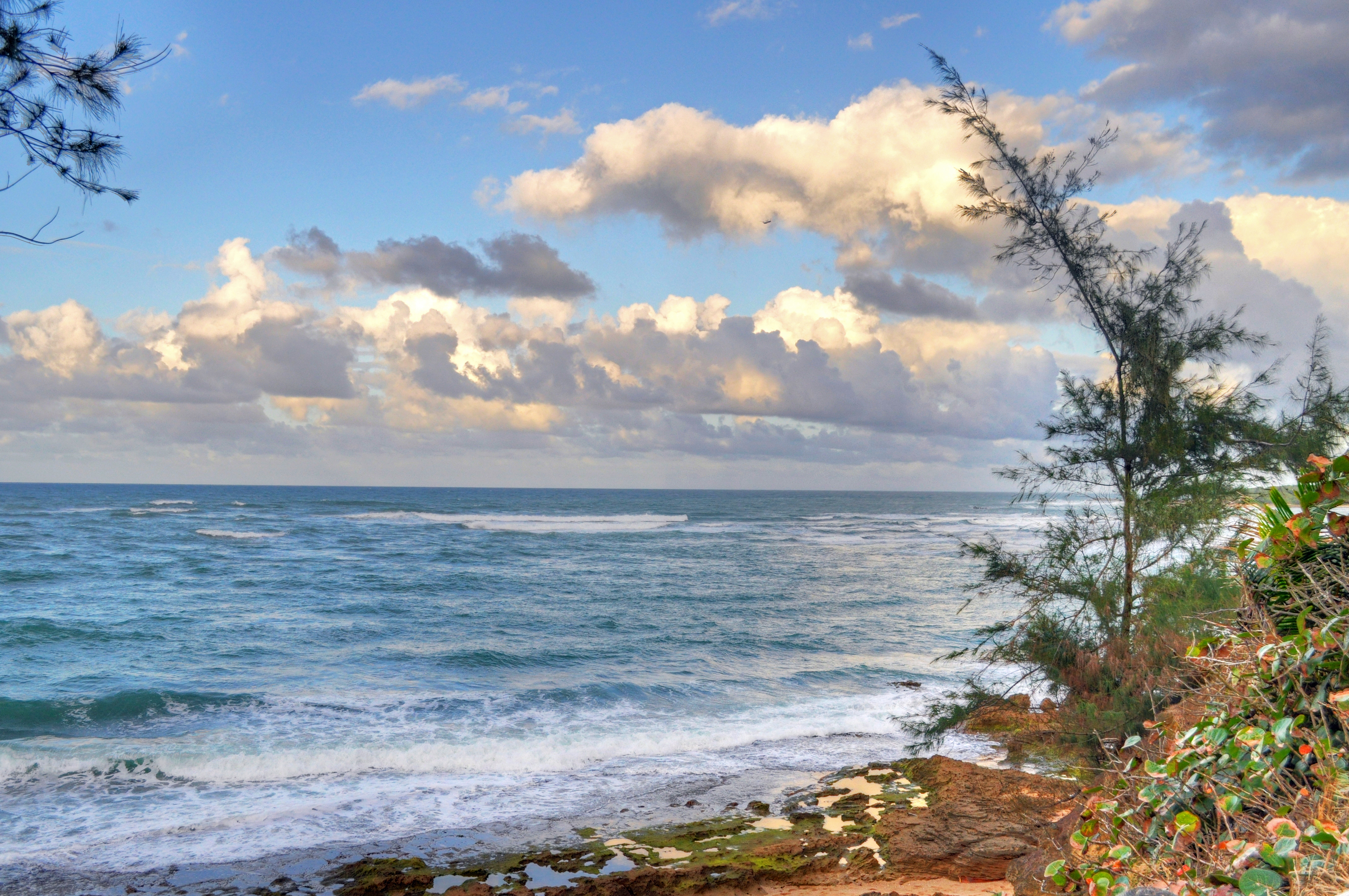

== See also ==
- List of Puerto Rico state forests
- List of National Natural Landmarks in Puerto Rico
