= Pomasia reticulata =

Scientific classification
- Kingdom: Animalia
- Phylum: Arthropoda
- Class: Insecta
- Order: Lepidoptera
- Family: Geometridae
- Genus: Pomasia
- Species: P. reticulata

Binomial name
- Pomasia reticulata Hampson, 1895

Species of moth

Pomasia reticulata is a moth in the family Geometridae first described by George Hampson in 1895. It is found in the Mergui Archipelago of Myanmar and in Penang in Peninsular Malaysia and in Borneo. The habitat primarily consists of coastal areas.

Adults are bright orange, the head, thorax and abdomen spotted with black. The forewings have double subbasal, antemedial, medial, postmedial and submarginal waved dark lines connected by blotches. The antemedial, medial, postmedial and submarginal double waved lines on the hindwings have a few blotches. There is a dentate line close to the margin and two spots on the margin.
