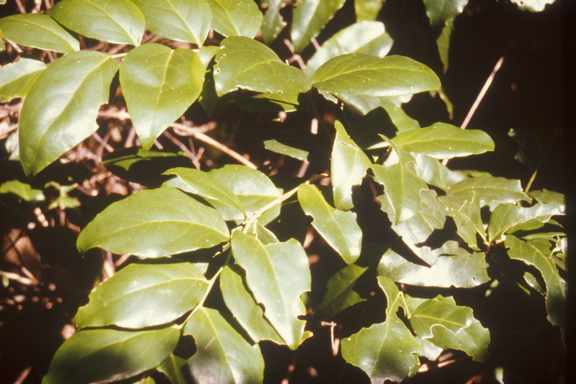

Conservation status
- Endangered (IUCN 2.3)

Scientific classification
- Kingdom: Plantae
- Clade: Tracheophytes
- Clade: Angiosperms
- Clade: Eudicots
- Order: Santalales
- Family: Schoepfiaceae
- Genus: Schoepfia
- Species: S. arenaria

Binomial name
- Schoepfia arenaria Britt. apud Urb.

= Schoepfia arenaria =

Species of plant

Schoepfia arenaria is an extremely rare species of hemiparasitic flowering plant in the Schoepfiaceae family. It grows as a small, multi-trunked tree. It is endemic to Puerto Rico, where it is found growing along the northern coast. A local Spanish vernacular name recorded for this tree is araña ('spider'). It has no common name in English.

== Taxonomy ==
Schoepfia arenaria was first collected near the small town of Santurce in 1899, immediately after the US had conquered Puerto Rico from the Spain and renamed the island Porto Rico. It grew here amongst other shrubs atop the higher sand dunes along the beach -although not stated as such, the derivation of the specific epithet is thus likely derived from the Latin word arena, meaning 'sand'. There were three American plant collectors busy on the same beach that day, Amos Arthur Heller and his wife, Emily Gertrude, sent by the New York Botanical Gardens, and Charles Frederick Millspaugh from the Field Museum of Natural History, and all collected samples of the species. Millspaugh identified his specimens as S. didyma in 1900 in his account of his Caribbean yacht cruise, but in the 1905 volume of Symbolae Antillanae, Ignatz Urban questioned identifying the Santurce Schoepfia specimens as such, and he instead classified them as S. arborescens, now considered a synonym of S. schreberi. In the 1907 volume of the Symbolae Antillanae, Urban identified the Santurce beach specimens as a species new to science, which he described as S. arenaria, attributing the name to Nathaniel Lord Britton.

== Description ==
Schoepfia arenaria is a small evergreen tree growing to 6m in height. It generally grows as a cluster of trunks from the base at ground-level, up to 10cm in diameter. The wood is light brown and hard. The trunks are covered in very thick, furrowed, grey-coloured bark. These bear thin twigs devoid of hairs, but striated with streaks of whitish cork from a young age. The bark is coloured grey, the outer bark becoming chocolate brown on the inside and the inner bark is pink.

The leaves are simple, alternate, and lack stipules. The ovate leaves are 4.5-8.5(-11)cm long by 3–4.5(-6)cm in width, and gradually become narrower towards their end, tapering to an obtuse or subacute (not really sharp) tip. The base is rounded or broadly becomes wider, slightly inequilateral. The texture is firm, almost leathery or like thick paper, and usually sparely tuberculate on both sides. The colour of the leaves is glaucous, pale green to olive; the leaves have a dull sheen when not wet. There is a flat or slightly raised midrib from which 4 or 5 pairs of lateral veins curve towards the apex (never looping back to the midrib), of which the first pair appears at the very base of the leaf. These veins are also flat or slightly raised on both sides. The petiole is 3-5mm long.

The greenish or light yellow flowers arise from older leaf axils from which the leaves have fallen, only a single 7(-8)mm long peduncle grows per axil, but this bears two to three sessile flowers at its top. The flowers are subtended by an epicalyx of which the bracts are more or less connate, forming a 1mm long cup. Plants are heterostylous; they bear two types of flowers: dolichostylous and brachystylous flowers. Dolichostylous flowers bear a glabrous corolla shaped ovate-cylindrical, which measures 7mm long including the lobes, and 3.5mm in diameter. The triangular-lanceolate lobes comprise two fifths of the corolla length. The brachystylous flowers have a cylindrical corolla, 7-8mm in length, and the lobes of these flowers are suberect and only attain a fifth of the corolla length. The disk and the top of the ovary are glabrous in both flower types.

It produces a shiny red fruit shaped as and as large as a medium-sized olive. The fruit is a single-seeded drupe, 11-12mm long and 9-10mm wide.

=== Similar species ===
Based on the 1984 key by Hermann Otto Sleumer, among the other Schoepfia species, S. arenaria is most similar to those species which occur in the same region: S. cubensis, S. didyma, S. haitiensis, S. schreberi and S. vacciniifolia, especially the last, a smaller-leaved species from Central America.

It shares Puerto Rico with two other Schoepfia species, S. obovata and S. schreberi. Both species may occur in roughly the same habitat. S. obovata has smaller flowers and much broader leaves, and flowers from both defoliate and still leafy stems. S. schreberi has often similar leaves, but differs in having numerous peduncles in the leaf axils, smaller flowers with pinkish or reddish lobes. The peduncles usually only have a single sessile flower in this species.

== Distribution ==
It is endemic to the US island of Puerto Rico in the Caribbean. It occurs in the northern coastal part of the island.

It was originally collected along a beach near the town of Santurce, now a suburb of the capital city of Puerto Rico, San Juan. The species was collected here again in 1939, but it is most certainly eliminated from the area at present. In 1991 there are only about 200 individuals known to exist in the wild, and they were divided amongst five locations. The World Conservation Monitoring Centre stated in their 1998 IUCN Red List assessment that there were only about 120 individuals known to exist after Hurricane Hugo had destroyed a number of the plants, but that the hurricane had caused a large crop of seeds to grow. Hurricane Hugo hit Puerto Rico in 1989, so the assessment may have been written a considerable time before it was accepted into the Red List and rather outdated.

The four originally known localities are at Isabela, Fajardo, Piñones Commonwealth Forest and Río Abajo Commonwealth Forest. The largest population, some 100 individuals of all ages, is found at Isabela, on private land. These plants are found growing on the wooded upper slopes of the hills to the west of the mouth of the Guajataca Gorge. The hills are only a remnant of the original land, most other hills in this area were destroyed during construction of Highway 2. The surroundings have further been developed into numerous golf courses, hotel resorts, tennis courts and housing units. The population at Piñones is located at Punta Maldonado, it was once larger, but numerous mature plants were destroyed by Hurricane Hugo in 1989. In 1991 there were still some 30 trees here, but there were numerous seedlings and young saplings. Roy O. Woodbury reported also seeing the species at nearby Punta Vacia Talega in 1981, but these appear to have disappeared by 1991. Both these Piñones locations are not actually in the forest proper, but are actually on private lands. At El Convento, Fajardo, the species grows on small limestone hills on the property of the governor's beach house. At least 10 individuals were counted here in the early 1990s, but some 50 individuals are estimated to grow on the property. Only a single individual tree was found growing in the Río Abajo Forest in 1985, at a place called Cuesta de los Perros.

Vicente Quevedo, from the Puerto Rico Department of Natural and Environmental Resources, reported finding more plants at the Tortuguero Lagoon Natural Reserve in 1990.

== Ecology ==
It is thought to be hemiparasitic. The flowers of S. arenaria appear mainly in the spring and fall, and the fruit in the summer and winter.

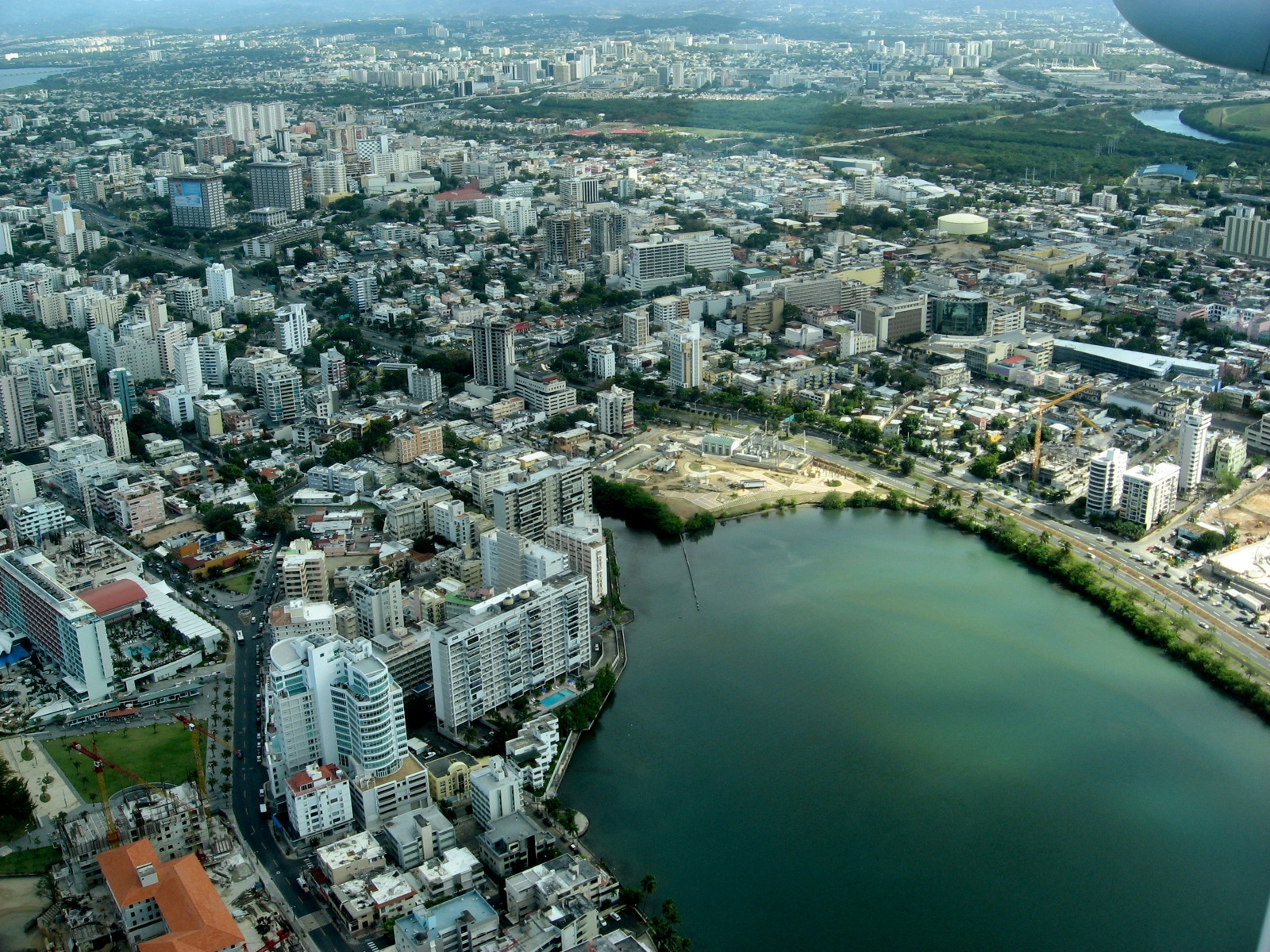
Aerial view of the habitat at the original collection locality in 2008

It is known from elevations of 0-30m. It was originally collected amongst other shrubs atop the higher sand dunes along a beach in what is now a suburb of the capital city of Puerto Rico. Millspaugh noted in 1900 that the flora of the sandy beaches around San Juan was unique in the Antilles, differing from the usual coastal species of the Caribbean. The most common plants found here were Wedelia trilobata, Bidens leucantha, Coccoloba uvifera and Ipomoea pes-caprae. The habitat in which modern populations are mostly found is small limestone hills in coastal, evergreen and semi-evergreen, subtropical, moist thickets or forests.

== Conservation ==
Woodbury considered the species 'endangered' in 1975. This tree was recommended for federal listing in the 1978 book Endangered and threatened plants of the United States, issued by the Smithsonian Institution and World Wildlife Fund. Based on that, it was federally listed as a threatened species by the United States government in 1991. Listing took so long because other species had priority, but it had been in the pipeline since 1980. It was first assessed as 'indeterminate' by Walter and Gillett for the IUCN Red List of Threatened Species in 1997, but was declared to be 'endangered' by the World Conservation Monitoring Centre for the same organisation's website the following year. These newer assessments are all based on the same information from 1991. The most up to date information about the state of the species is still by Marelisa Rivera at the Fish and Wildlife Service in the Federal Register of 1991, at this time there were some 200 trees growing in the wild, in five locations. These plants were in a good condition and in all stages of growth, indicating the plant was and had been propagating naturally without hindrance, which led to the assessment as 'threatened' as opposed to 'endangered'.

The largest population, in Isabela, was on private land owned by the company Costa Isabela Partners. This company had indicated this land was to be donated to the Puerto Rico Department of Natural Resources for its protection, and that they supported federally listing the species.

The species was being propagated in Puerto Rico in 2006 in order to replant it in new areas in the future. It is also being grown in Arboretum Parque Doña Inés.
