= Pomasia obliterata =

Scientific classification
- Kingdom: Animalia
- Phylum: Arthropoda
- Class: Insecta
- Order: Lepidoptera
- Family: Geometridae
- Genus: Pomasia
- Species: P. obliterata

Binomial name
- Pomasia obliterata (Walker, 1866)

Synonyms
- Eupithecia obliterata Walker, 1866; Pomasia conferta Swinhoe, 1902

Species of moth

Pomasia obliterata is a moth in the family Geometridae. It is found on Borneo, Peninsular Malaysia and Siberut Island. The habitat consists of lowland areas, including alluvial forests.
