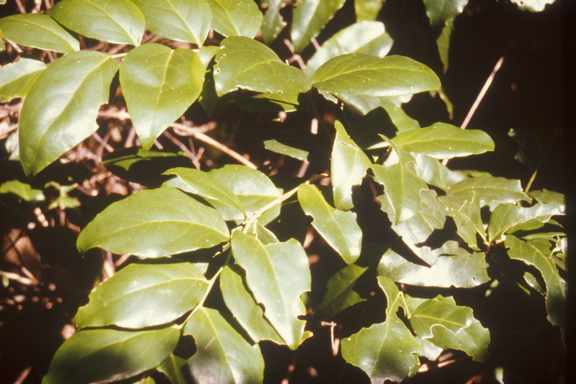
- Schoepfia arenaria

Scientific classification
- Kingdom: Plantae
- Clade: Tracheophytes
- Clade: Angiosperms
- Clade: Eudicots
- Order: Santalales
- Family: Schoepfiaceae
- Genus: Schoepfia; Schreb.

Species
- See text.

Synonyms
- Codonium Vahl; Diplocalyx A.Rich.; Haenkea Ruiz & Pav.; Pseudogonocalyx Bisse & Berazaín; Ribeirea Allemão; Schoepfiopsis Miers

= Schoepfia =

Genus of flowering plants

Schoepfia is a genus of small hemiparasitic trees, flowering plants belonging to the family Schoepfiaceae. The genus has long been placed in the Olacaceae family.

== Description ==
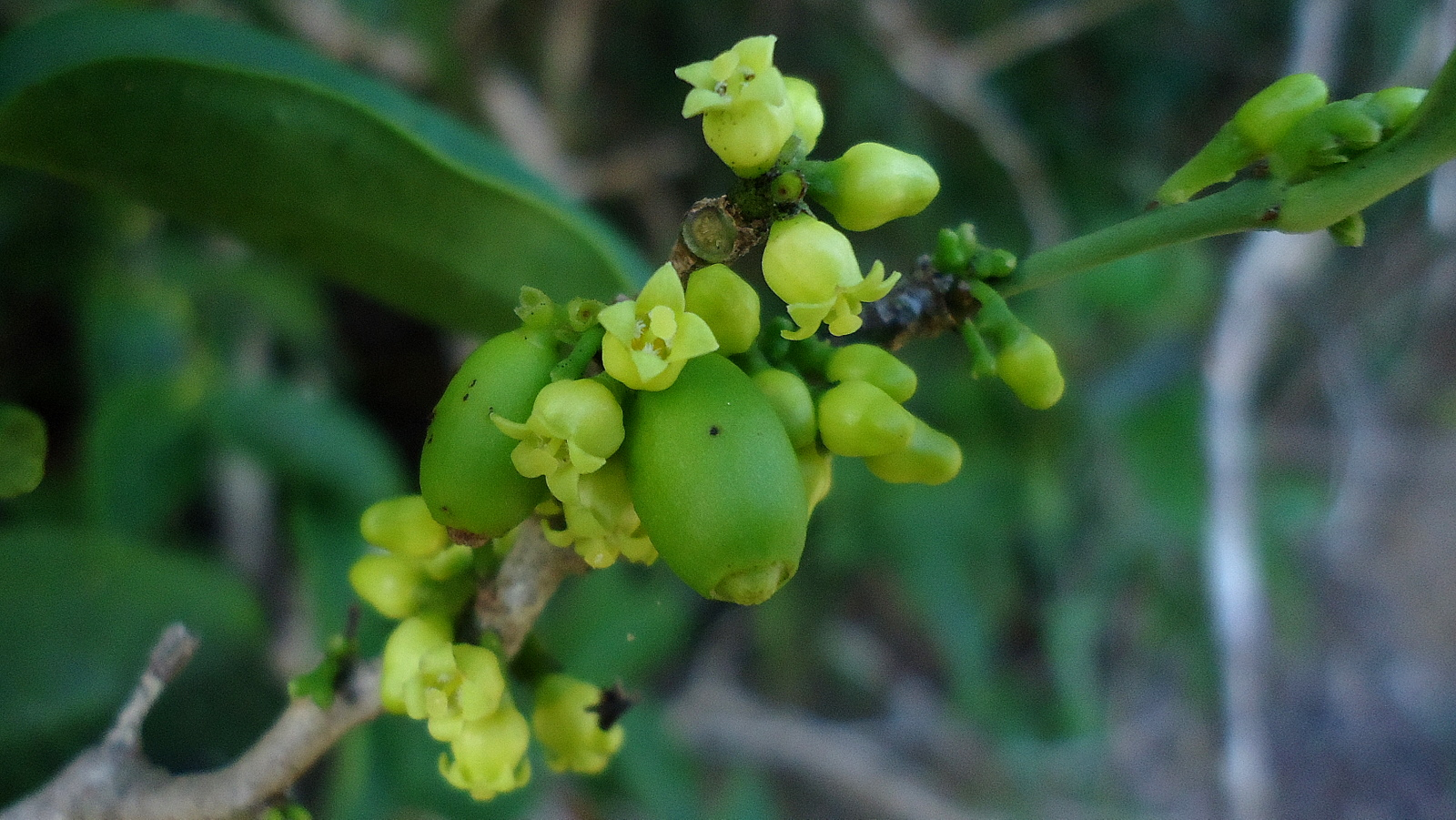
Flowers and fruit of Schoepfia brasiliensis near Entre Rios, Bahia, Brazil

Plants in this genus are small trees or shrubs which exhibit heterostyly - individuals can have both often cylindrical brachystylous (short styled) flowers and somewhat bell-shaped dolichostylous (longer styled) flowers. In most plants where heterostyly occurs, there is a sexual differentiation between flower types, the brachystylous flowers being functionally male, or one type of flower is cleistogamous or self-fertile. In Schoepfia species both flowers are bisexual and can form fruit, the reason for two flower forms is mysterious.

The flowers are fragrant and small. They arise from a short peduncle which grows from the leaf axils of a stem. The peduncle is subtended by persistent, imbricate perular bracts. The flower is subtended by a three-lobed epicalyx, it is composed of a bract and two bracteoles, which are all united into a single structure. The actual calyx is inconspicuous, it is completely fused to the truncated, cup-shaped base of the flower. From the edges of this base, generally four or five petals arise, rarely three or six. The lower part of these petals are fused to each other to form a tube of sorts.

The leaves of all species are simple, entire, alternate, penninerved and have petioles. The fruits are single-seeded drupes. The epicarp is derived from the swollen base of the flower.

== Taxonomy ==
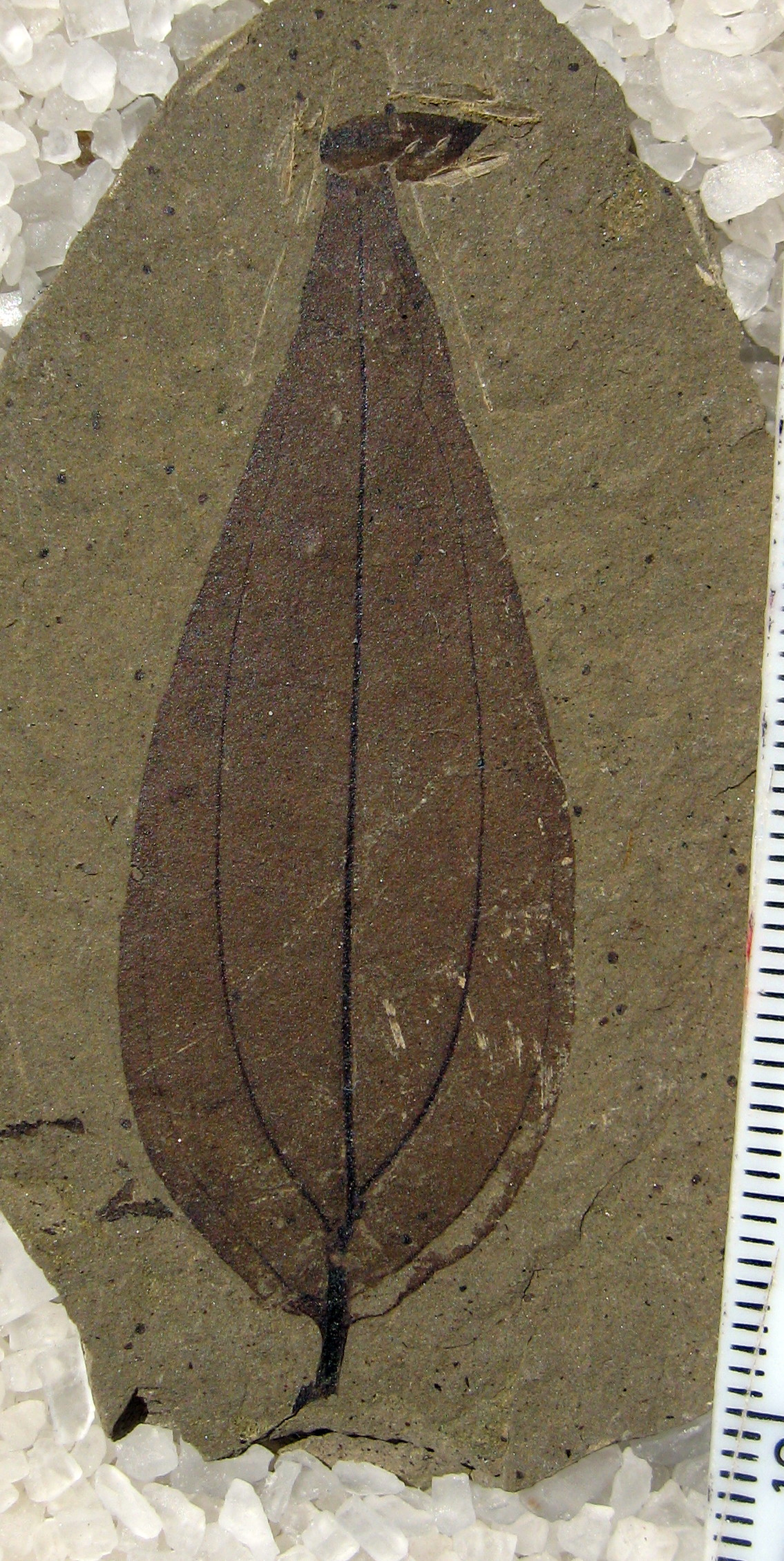
Schoepfia republicensis leaf fossil

It is now placed in the Schoepfiaceae family. The genus has long been placed in the Olacaceae family, although many researchers noted the differences between it and the rest of the family. Recent molecular studies have shown Schoepfia to be more closely related to the families Misodendraceae and Loranthaceae, and to uphold the criteria of monophyly it must be excluded from Olacaceae.

The genus is split into three sections: two occur exclusively in Asia, with four species altogether, the third section, which includes the type species, only occurs in the Americas and contains all the other species. The type species is Schoepfia schreberi. One possible fossil species, †S. republicensis, has been described from Ypresian leaves found in the Klondike Mountain Formation of Washington state.

=== Species ===
As of April 2021, Plants of the World Online accepted the following species:

- Schoepfia arenaria Britton
- Schoepfia brasiliensis A.DC.
- Schoepfia californica Brandegee
- Schoepfia chinensis Gardner & Champ.
- Schoepfia clarkii Steyerm.
- Schoepfia cubensis Britton & P.Wilson
- Schoepfia didyma C.Wright ex Griseb.
- Schoepfia flexuosa (Ruiz & Pav.) Roem. & Schult.
- Schoepfia fragrans Wall.
- Schoepfia griffithii Tiegh. ex Steenis
- Schoepfia haitiensis Urb. & Britton
- Schoepfia harrisii Urb.
- Schoepfia jasminodora Siebold & Zucc.
- Schoepfia lucida Pulle
- Schoepfia macrophylla Lundell
- Schoepfia multiflora Urb.
- Schoepfia obovata C.Wright - white beefwood
- Schoepfia paradoxa (Bisse & Berazaín) Berazaín ex Acev.-Rodr.
- Schoepfia parvifolia Planch.
- Schoepfia pringlei B.L.Rob.
- Schoepfia schreberi J.F.Gmel. - gulf graytwig
- Schoepfia scopulorum Alain
- Schoepfia shreveana Wiggins
- Schoepfia stenophylla Urb.
- Schoepfia tepuiensis Steyerm.
- Schoepfia tetramera Herzog
- Schoepfia vacciniiflora Planch. ex Hemsl.
- Schoepfia velutina Sandwith

== Distribution ==
The genus has a discontinuous distribution, being native to the Himalayas through China, Japan and Taiwan to Sumatra, and to tropical and subtropical America. The genus is most diverse in tropical America. Three species occur in territories belonging to the United States: Schoepfia arenaria, S. obovata and S. schreberi; S. schreberi occurs in Florida and the Caribbean, the other two are only found in the US Caribbean possessions.

== Ecology ==
Species in this genus are root hemiparasites, deriving a portion of their nutrition by invading the roots and stealing the nutrients of neighbouring plants. They do not appear to be very particular in choice of host plants. A 1979 study of Schoepfia schreberi in Florida and the Bahamas found haustoria (specialised organs on the roots used for parasitism) connected to ten different species, belonging to eight different botanical families. Haustoria were also firmly welded to the wrong things: rocks, buried pipes, concrete building foundations, etc.

The young leaves of the S. schreberi are fed upon by the balloon-collared caterpillars of the metalmark butterfly Calydna sturnula, which are only known to feed upon this species.
