= Tortuguero Lagoon =

Natural reservoir located between Vega Baja and Manatí, Puerto Rico

Laguna Tortuguero
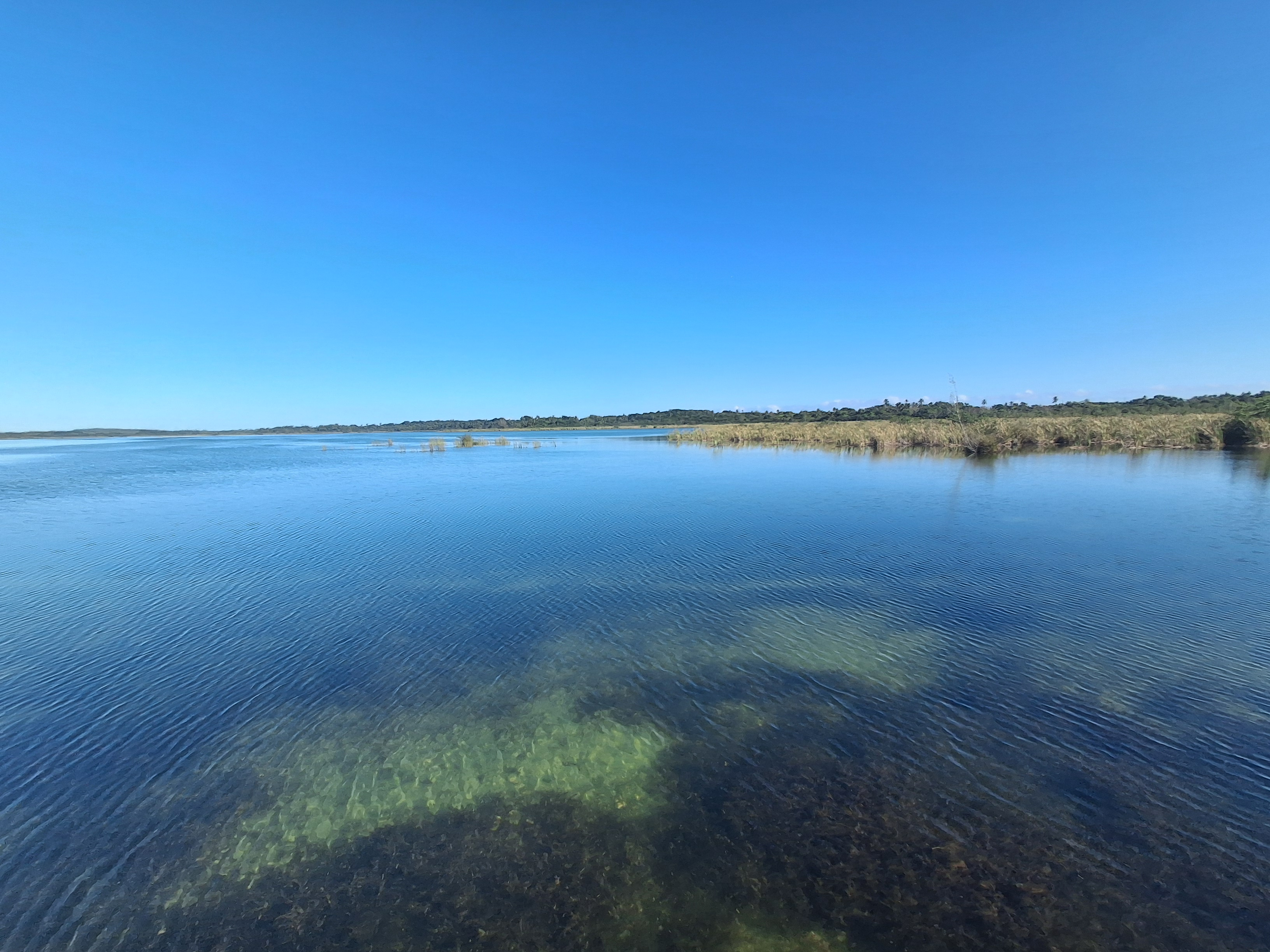
- View from the western shore in Vega Baja

- Location within Puerto Rico
- Location: Manatí and Vega Baja, Puerto Rico
- Coordinates: 18°27′48″N 66°26′29″W
- Type: freshwater lagoon
- Primary outflows: Caño Tortuguero
- Max. length: 4.6 km (2.9 mi)
- Max. width: 1 km (0.62 mi)
- Surface area: 545 acres (221 ha)
- Average depth: 1.5 m (4 ft 11 in)
- Max. depth: 3 m (9.8 ft)
- Water volume: 6.43 mi (10.35 km)

Tortuguero Lagoon (Spanish: Laguna Tortuguero) is a large freshwater lagoon located in the municipalities of Manatí and Vega Baja, in the northern coast of the island of Puerto Rico. The lagoon has a surface area of approximately 545 acres or 2.21 square kilometers and its basin covers approximately 2.43 km^{2} (0.94 sq mi), making it the largest freshwater lagoon in the island. It is one of only two natural freshwater lagoons in the island of Puerto Rico (the other being Laguna Cartagena in Lajas). The basin of Tortuguero Lagoon is protected as part of Laguna Tortuguero Nature Reserve, a protected natural area designated in 1979 through the Puerto Rico Coastal Zone Management program that also protects its adjacent coastline, natural water springs and surrounding secondary forests.

== Geography ==
Tortuguero Lagoon is located between the municipalities of Vega Baja and Manatí and covers approximately 2.43 km^{2} (0.94 sq mi). It sits on the coastal outcrop of the Puerto Rico Northern Karst belt, and its region its notable for the high number of natural springs which originate in the porous limestone geology of the area. The basin of the lagoon contains numerous examples of these natural springs such as the Guayaney Spring (Manantial Guayaney) in Manatí and the Tortguero Spring (Manantial Tortuguero) or Guarico Spring (Manantial Guarico) in Vega Baja. The nearby Ojo de Agua spring is another example of this feature. The lagoon is connected to the Atlantic Ocean through the Caño Tortuguero, and it is surrounded by a number of smaller satellite lagoons such as Laguna Rica and Cabo Caribe.

Generally, the Tortuguero basin is made up of swamps, marshes, soils of silica sand and hills. Tortuguero Lagoon contains about 708 million gallons of water.

== Ecology ==
Laguna Tortuguero and its surrounding hydrology is notable for its diverse nature, both native and introduced. There are 23 species of fish in the lagoon, among the native are eels, tarpon, snook and mackerel bigeye. Among those introduced are the black seabream, bass and tilapia. It also emphasizes the presence of oviparous fish such as the "guppy" of the genus Poecilia. Other fish species include eels, chad (Elops saurus), common snook (Centropomus undecimalis) and big-eye scad mackerel or horse-eye jack (Caranx latus). Introduced fish species include the black seabream or chopa (Spondyliosoma cantharus) and the tilapia (Oreochromis urolepis).

=== Invasive caimans ===
Tortuguero Lagoon and its basin are home to one of the largest populations of spectacled caiman (Caiman crocodilus) in Puerto Rico. Originally from Central and South America, its presence has been notable in the area since the 1950s and 1960s due to the illegal pet trade. Locally known as the common caiman, this animal is now considered a plague throughout Puerto Rico due to its lack of natural predators or fair ecological competition. Caimans numbers keep steadily growing in the lagoon and its surrounding waterways, and attacks on pets and children have been reported in recent years.
