= Puerto Nuevo, Vega Baja, Puerto Rico =

Barrio of Puerto Rico

Puerto Nuevo
- Barrio
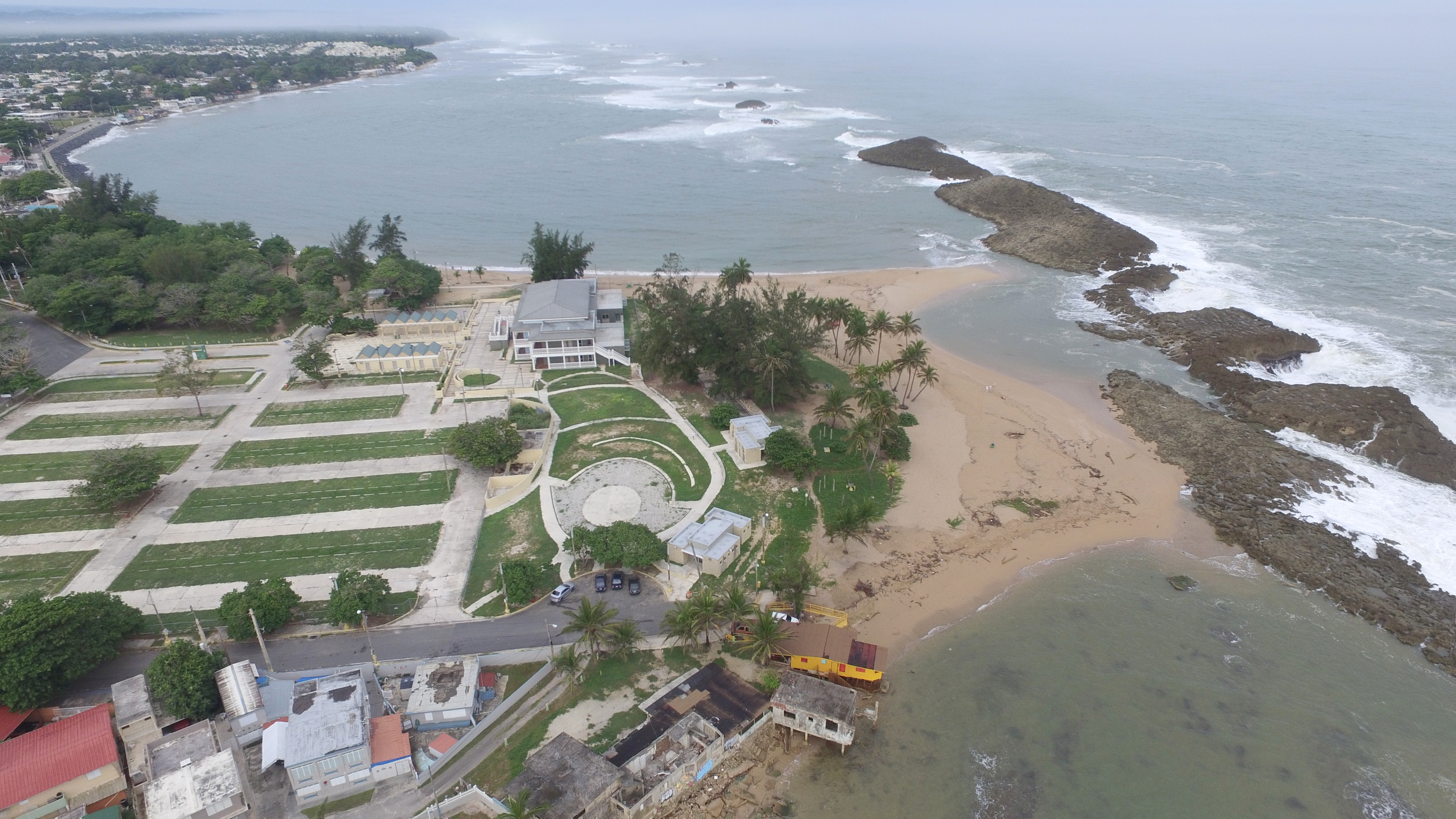
- Beach at Puerto Nuevo

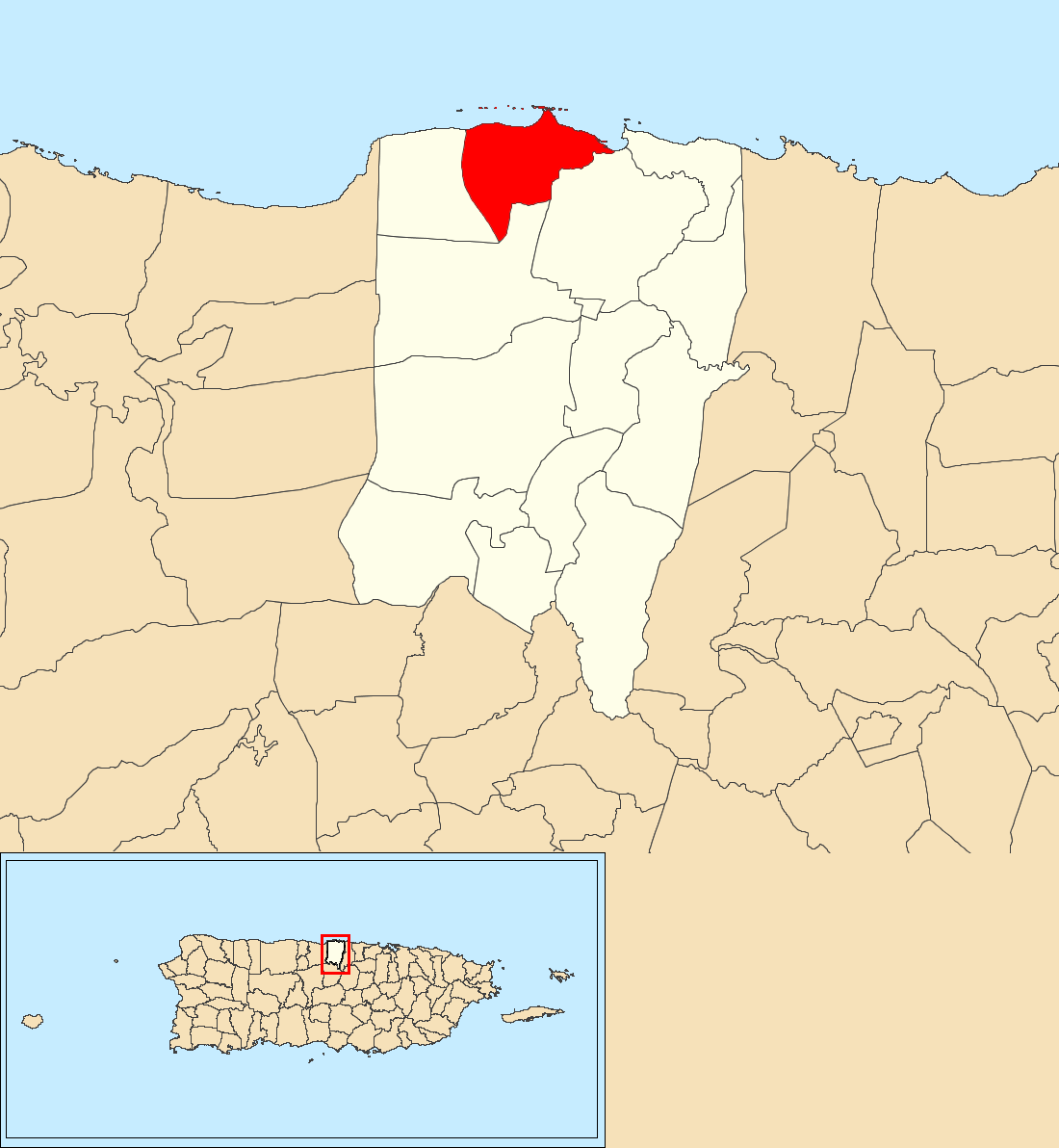
- Location of Puerto Nuevo within the municipality of Vega Baja shown in red

- Location of Puerto Rico
- Coordinates: 18°29′03″N 66°24′06″W
- Commonwealth: Puerto Rico
- Municipality: Vega Baja

Area
  - Total: 4.28 sq mi (11.1 km^{2})
  - Land: 2.67 sq mi (6.9 km^{2})
  - Water: 1.61 sq mi (4.2 km^{2})
- Elevation: 23 ft (7.0 m)

Population (2010)
  - Total: 5,908
  - Density: 2,229.4/sq mi (860.8/km^{2})
- Source: 2010 Census
- Time zone: UTC−4 (AST)

Puerto Nuevo is a barrio in the municipality of Vega Baja, Puerto Rico. Its population in 2010 was 5,908.

== History ==
Puerto Nuevo was in Spain's gazetteers until Puerto Rico was ceded by Spain in the aftermath of the Spanish–American War under the terms of the Treaty of Paris of 1898 and became an unincorporated territory of the United States. In 1899, the United States Department of War conducted a census of Puerto Rico finding that the population of Puerto Nuevo barrio was 706.

Historical population
Census	Pop.	Note	%±
1900	706		—
1910	631		−10.6%
1920	650		3.0%
1930	856		31.7%
1940	931		8.8%
1950	1,552		66.7%
1960	1,848		19.1%
1970	2,054		11.1%
1980	3,649		77.7%
1990	4,286		17.5%
2000	5,463		27.5%
2010	5,908		8.1%
U.S. Decennial Census; 1899 (shown as 1900) 1910-1930; 1930-1950 1960 1980-2000 2010

== Puerto Nuevo Beach ==
Mar Bella Beach, colloquially known as the Puerto Nuevo Beach, has received Blue Flag beach ratings two years in a row, as of 2019, for being a high quality beach. In the high season the beach receives up to 15,000 visitors.

== Gallery ==
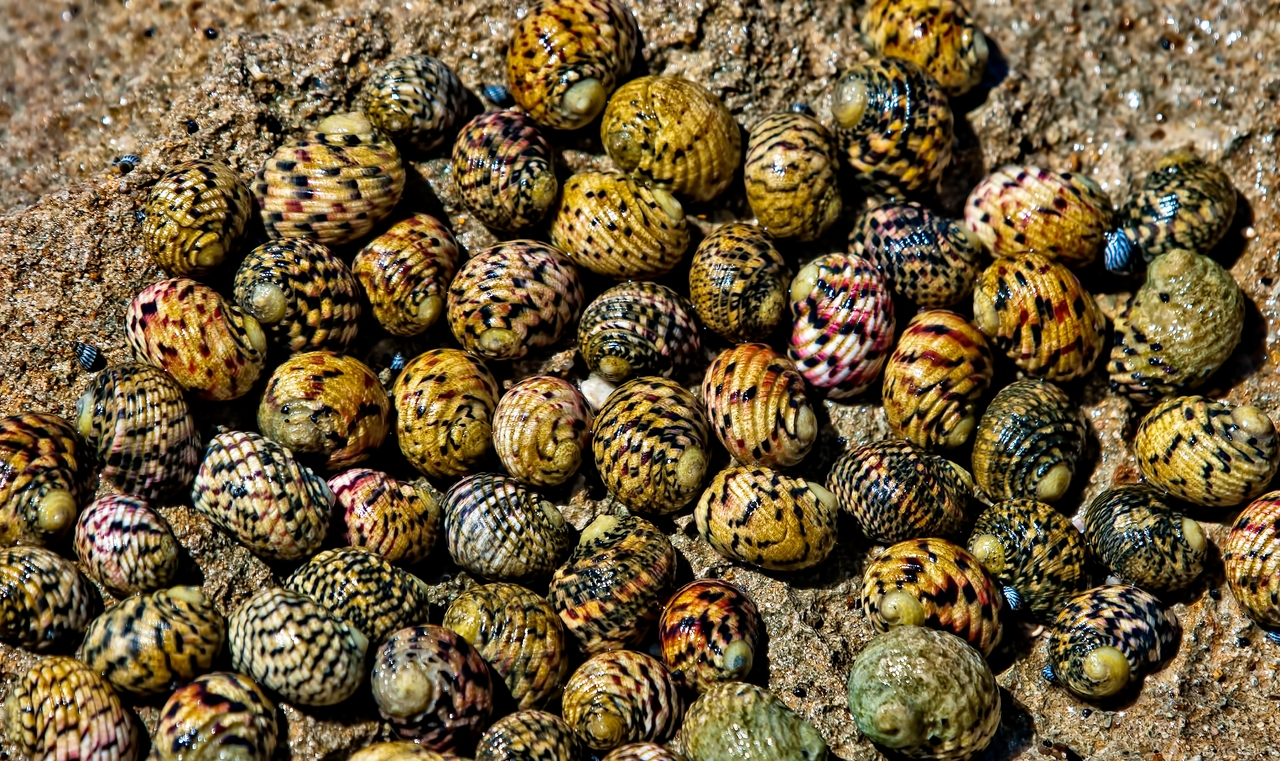
Puerto Nuevo Mar Bella beach

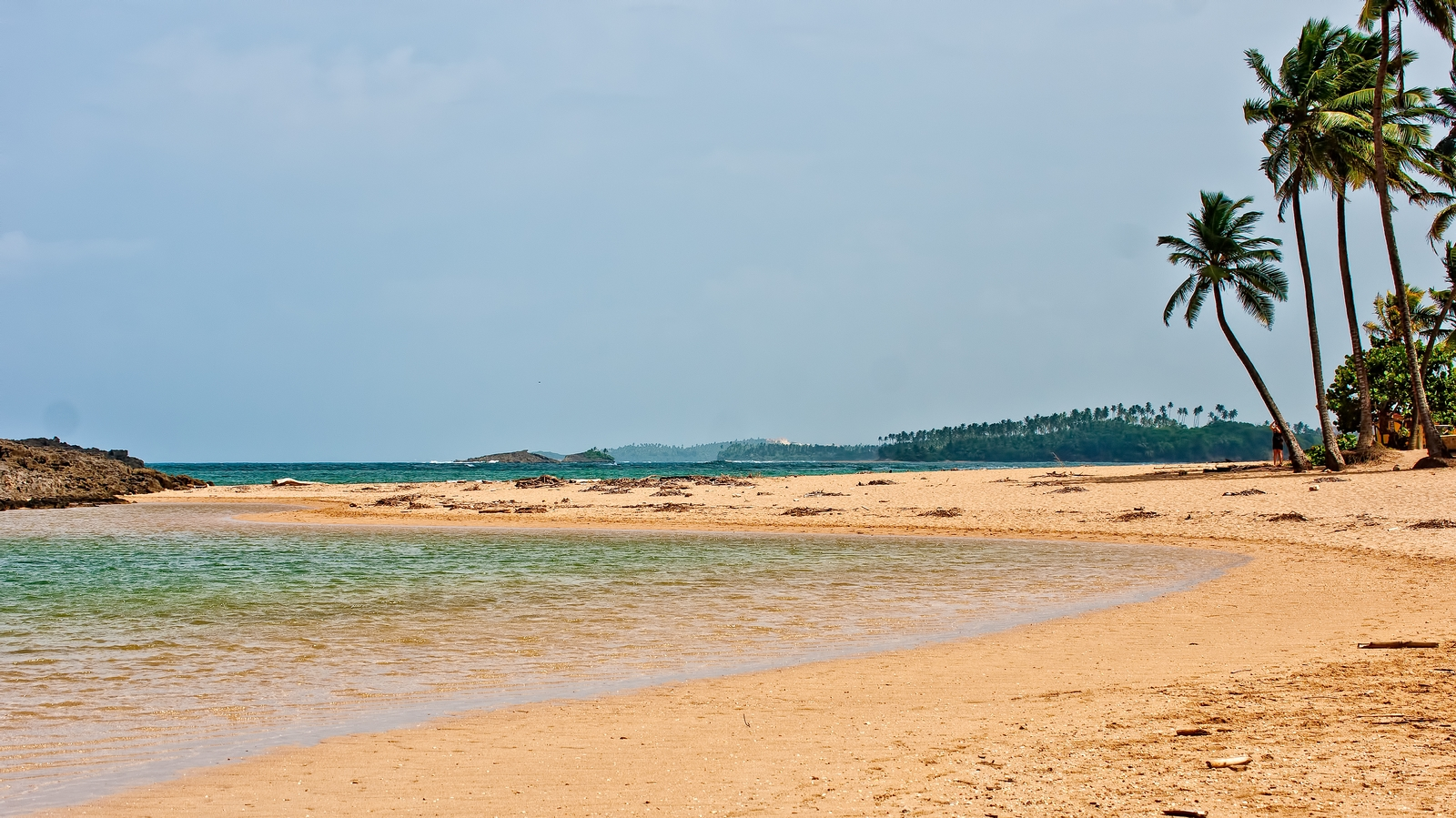

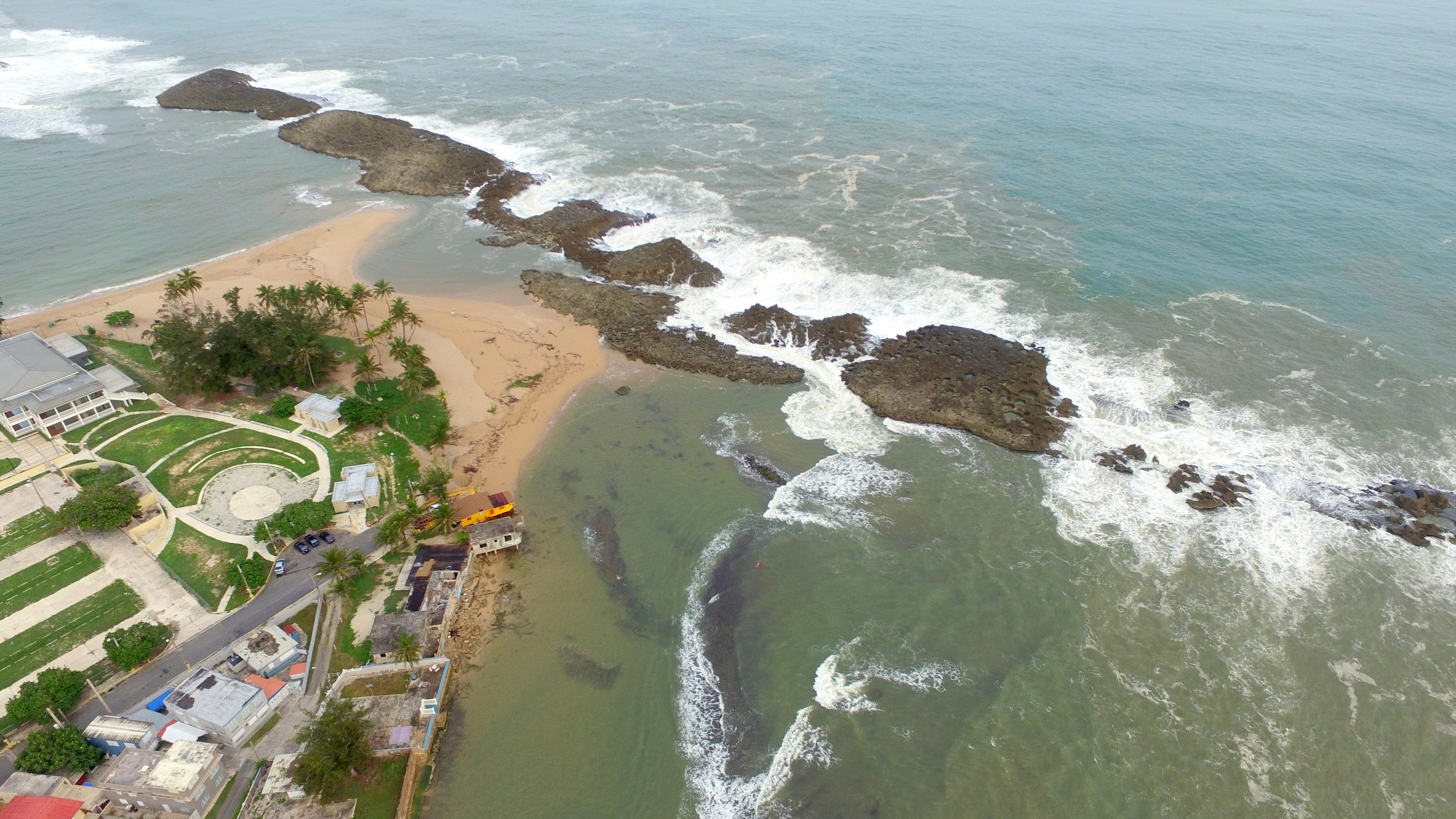

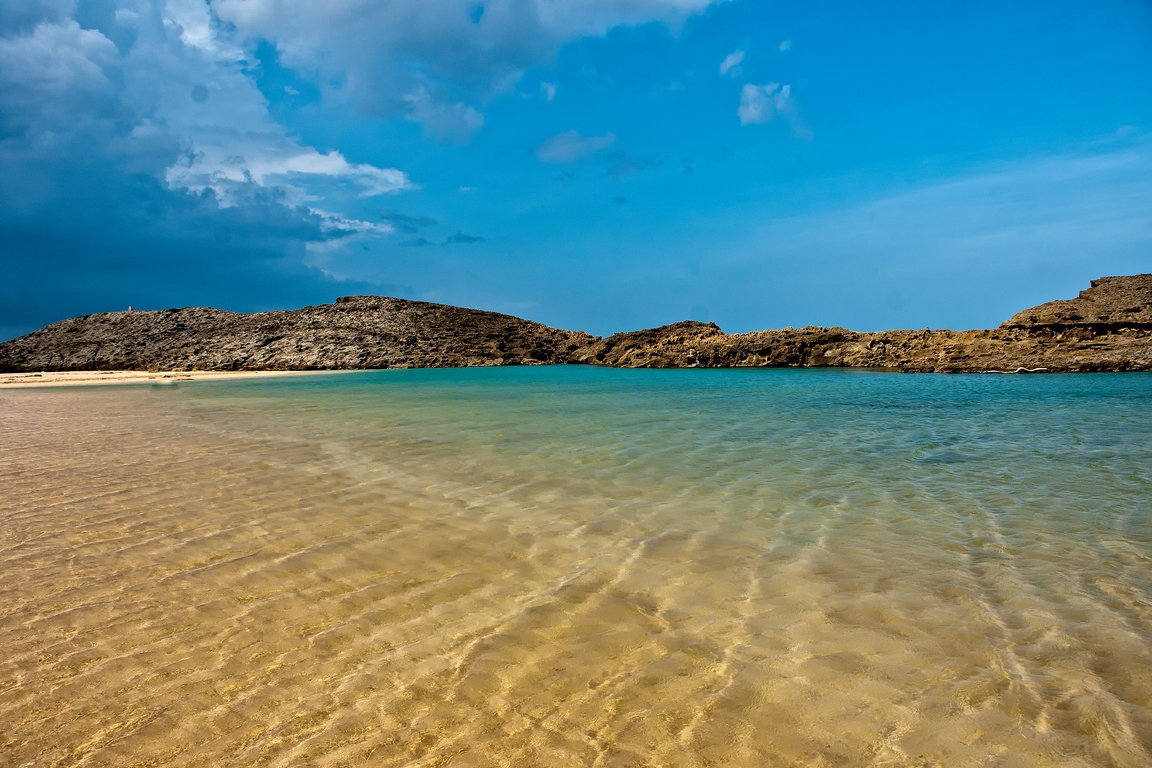

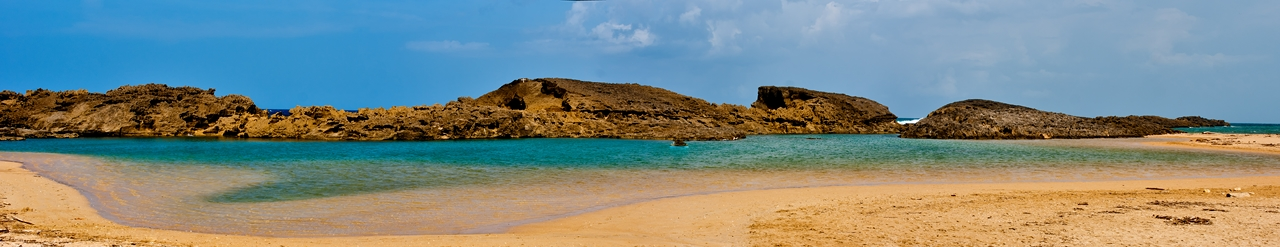

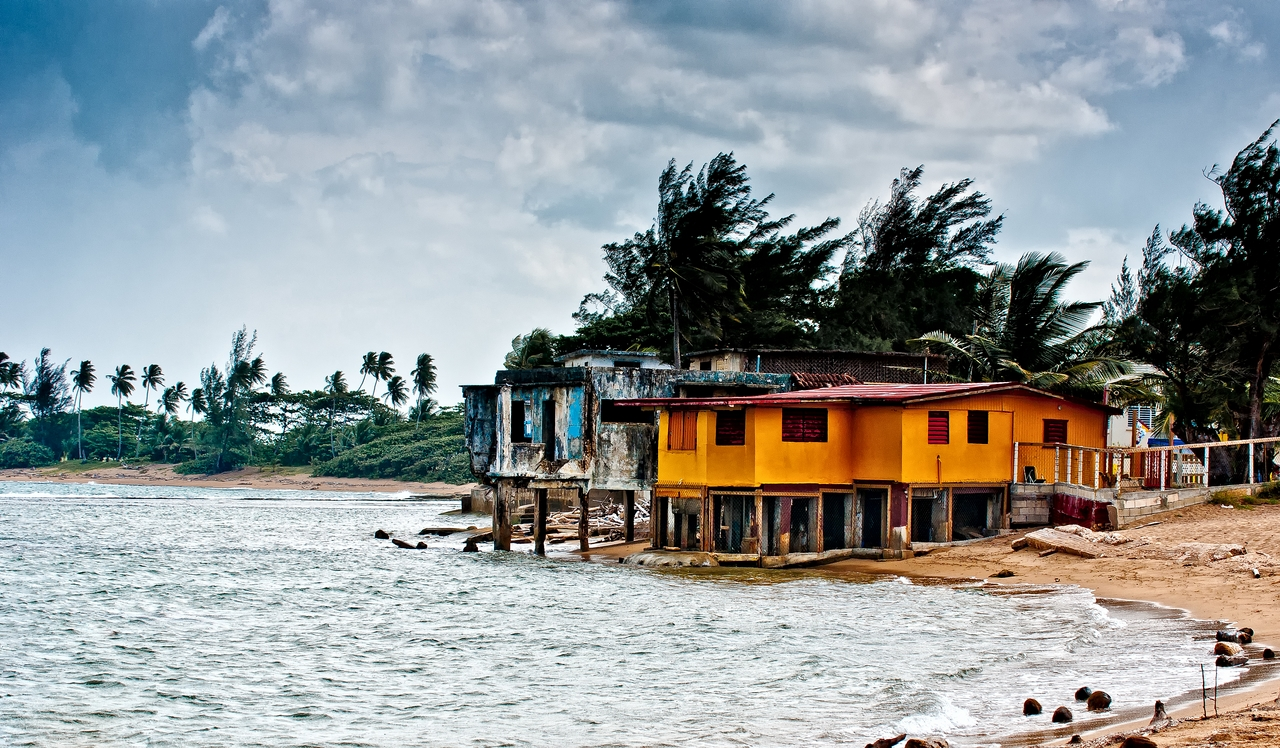

Spanish rapping in the Summer of 1995 with a cameo by Snoop Dogg at Puerto Nuevo Beach

== See also ==
- List of communities in Puerto Rico
- Reggaeton
