= Dani =

Dani may refer to:

== People ==
- Dani people, a people living in Highland Papua, Indonesia
- Dani (surname), a surname
- Danes (tribe), a tribe in southern Scandinavia
- Dani (singer, born 1944) (Danièle Graule), French singer and actress
- Dani (footballer, born 1951) (Daniel Ruiz-Bazán Justa), Spanish striker
- Dani (footballer, born 1976) (Daniel da Cruz Carvalho), Portuguese midfielder
- Dani (footballer, born 1981) (Daniel Martín Alexandre), Spanish striker
- Dani (footballer, born 1982) (Daniel Ricardo da Silva Soares), Portuguese midfielder
- Dani (footballer, born 1990) (Daniel Filipe Faria Coelho), Portuguese right back
- Dani (game developer, born 1997) (Daniel William Sooman), Norwegian YouTuber and video game developer

=== Given name ===
- Dani Alonso (born 1988), Brazilian politician
- Dani Alves (born 1983), Brazilian footballer
- Dani Behr (born 1974), British TV presenter
- Dani Bondar (born 1987), Israeli football player
- Dani Borreguero (born 1975), Spanish footballer
- Dani Carvajal (born 1992), Spanish footballer
- Dani Ceballos (born 1996), Spanish footballer
- Dani Cimorelli (born 2000), American musician
- Dani Dennis-Sutton (born 2003), American football player
- Dani Dimitrovska (born 1979), Macedonian pop and rock singer
- Dani Drews (born 1999), American volleyball player
- Dani Filth (born 1973), British musician, leader of Cradle of Filth
- Dani García (footballer, born 1974), Spanish striker
- Danielle Goldstein (born 1985), American-Israeli show jumper known as Dani
- Danielson Gomes Monteiro (born 1984), Cape Verdean footballer known as Dani
- Dani Gómez (born 1990), Spanish singer and rapper known professionally as Kaydy Cain
- Dani Harmer (born 1989), British actress
- Dani Klein (born 1953), lead singer of the Belgian band Vaya Con Dios
- Dani Miguélez (born 1985), Spanish footballer
- Dani Ollenburg, American politician
- Dani Olmo (born 1998), Spanish footballer
- Dani Pedrosa (born 1985), Spanish motorcycle rider
- Dani Rodrik (born 1957), Turkish economist
- Dani Stevenson (born 1980), American R&B singer

=== Surname ===
- Ahmad Hasan Dani (1920–2009), Pakistani scholar
- Amit Dani (born 1973), Indian cricketer for Mumbai
- Ashu Dani (born 1974), Indian cricketer for Delhi
- Ashwin Dani, Indian entrepreneur
- Bal Dani (1933–1999), Indian cricketer
- Elhaida Dani (born 1993), Albanian singer
- Elibeidy Dani (born 1997), Dominican fashion model
- Filippo Dani (born 1999), Italian football player
- Francesca Dani (born 1979), Italian travel photographer
- Harsheel Dani (born 1996), Indian badminton player
- Kouch Dani (born 1990), French-born Cambodian footballer
- Nándor Dáni (1871–1949), Hungarian track athlete
- Omar Dani (1924–2009), commander of the Indonesian Air Force from 1962 to 1965
- Peter Dani (fl. 1976, died 2002), American soccer player
- Prabhakar Balwant Dani (1908–1965), Indian Hindu nationalist
- Rajesh Dani (born 1961), Indian cricketer
- Riza Dani (1884–1949), Albanian politician and activist
- S. G. Dani (born 1947), Indian mathematician
- Said Abdullahi Dani, Somali politician
- Shashikala Dani (born 1959), Indian musician
- Zoltán Dani (born 1956), Yugoslav army officer
- Zsolt Dani (born 1969), Hungarian rower

== Fictional characters ==
- Dani (Glee), a recurring character in the musical comedy-drama television series Glee
- Dani (Red Hot Chili Peppers), a girl appearing in several Red Hot Chili Peppers songs
- Dani Beck, on Law & Order: SVU
- Danielle Moonstar, nicknamed Dani, a comic book character associated with the X-Men
- Dani Trant, main character from the 1991 film The Man in the Moon
- Dani Phantom, a girl cloned from the titular character of the Nicktoon Danny Phantom

== Other uses ==
- Dani (magazine), a Bosnian-Herzegovinian news weekly
- Dan-i (段位), a Japanese martial arts ranking system, see Dan (rank)
- Dani languages, a family of Trans–New Guinea languages
- Deni language or Dani, an Arawan language of Brazil
- Dani (film), a 1957 Hungarian drama film
- Dany (film), or Dani, a 2001 Indian Malayalam film
- Dani, Myanmar, a village in Rakhine State
- Dani, Karlovac County, a village in Croatia

== See also ==
- Danni, a given name
- Dannii Minogue (born 1971), Australian singer and actress
- Daani, a 2006 Pakistani film
- Daniel (disambiguation)
- Danielle
- Dany (disambiguation)
