= Dani (surname) =

Dani is a surname.

== Notable people ==
Notable people with the surname include:

- Ahmad Hasan Dani (1920–2009), Pakistani archaeologist, historian, and linguist
- Prabhakar Balwant Dani (1908–1965), RSS Pracharak
- Amit Dani (born 1973), Indian cricketer for Mumbai
- Ashu Dani (born 1974), Indian cricketer for Delhi
- Ashwin Dani, Indian entrepreneur
- Bal Dani (1933–1999), Indian cricketer
- Elhaida Dani (born 1993), Albanian singer
- Harsheel Dani (born 1996), Indian badminton player
- Rajesh Dani (born 1961), Indian cricketer
- S. G. Dani (born 1947), Indian mathematician
- Shashikala Dani (born 1959), Indian musician
