= Dany =

Dany may refer to:

== People with the name ==
=== Given name ===
A form of the Hebrew words and names daniyyel דניאל (« God is my Judge ») or dan דָּן (« judgement » or « he judged »)

- Dany Abounaoum (born 1969), Lebanese alpine skier
- Dany Bahar (born 1971), Swiss businessman
- Dany Bébel-Gisler (1935–2003), Guadeloupean writer
- Dany Bédar, French Canadian singer
- Dany Bill (born 1973), Canadian kickboxer
- Dany Boon (born 1966), real name Daniel Faid Hamidou, French comedian and filmmaker
- Dany Bouchard (born 1967), Canadian cross-country skier
- Dany Brand (born 1996), Swiss hurdler
- Dany Brillant (born 1965), French musician
- Dany Bustros (1959–1998), Lebanese belly dancer and actress
- Dany Carrel (born 1932), real name Yvonne Suzanne Chazelles de Chaxel, French actress
- Dany Chamoun (1934–1990), Lebanese politician
- Dany Cooper, Australian film editor
- Dany Cotton (born 1969), British firefighter
- Dany Cure (born 1990), Venezuelan footballer
- Dany da Silva (born 1993), Swiss footballer
- Dany Doriz (born 1941), real name Daniel Dorisse, French jazz musician
- Dany Dauberson (1925–1979), French singer and actress
- Dany-Robert Dufour (born 1947), French philosopher
- Dany Engobo (born 1955), Republic of the Congo musician
- Dany Franchi (born 1990), Italian electric blues musician
- Dany Garcia (born 1968), American film producer
- Dany Gonçalves (born 1985), Portuguese sprinter
- Dany Haddad (born 1960), Lebanese fencer
- Dany Heatley (born 1981), Canadian ice hockey player, for the Ottawa Senators
- Dany Kane (1969–2000), Canadian criminal
- Dany Lademacher (born 1950), Belgian guitar player
- Dany Laferrière (born 1953), Haitian-Canadian novelist
- Dany Leviatan (born 1942), Israeli mathematician
- Dany Locati (born 1977), Italian skeleton racer
- Dany Maury (born 1994), Cameroonian footballer
- Dany Mendes Ribeiro (born 1988), Cape Verdean footballer
- Dany Morin (born 1985), Canadian politician and businessman
- Dany Mota Carvalho (born 1998), Luxembourgian-born Portuguese footballer
- Dany N'Guessan (born 1987), French footballer
- Dany Nounkeu (born 1986), Cameroonian footballer
- Dany Pen (born 1986), Cambodian-born Canadian artist, activist, and educator
- Dany Priso (born 1994), French rugby union player
- Dany Luis Quintero (born 1984), Cuban footballer
- Dany Rigoulot (born 1944), French figure skater
- Dany Robin (1927–1995), French actress
- Dany Roland (born 1962), Argentine-born Brazilian musician
- Dany Roussin (born 1985), Canadian ice hockey centre
- Dany Ryser (born 1957), Swiss football manager
- Dany Saadia (born 1973), Mexican filmmaker and businessman
- Dany Sabourin (born 1980), Canadian ice hockey goaltender
- Dany Saputra (born 1991), Indonesian footballer
- Dany Saval (born 1942), real name Danielle Nadine Suzanne Savalle, French actress
- Dany Silva, Cape Verdean musician
- Dany Stanišić, Serbian sailor
- Dany Toussaint, 2006 Haitian politician
- Dany Tuijnman (1915–1992), full name Daniël Sebastiaan Tuijnman, Dutch politician
- Dany Vandenbossche (1956–2013), Belgian politician
- Dany Verissimo (born 1982), French actress
- Dany Verlinden (born 1963), real name Daniël Verdlinden, Belgian goalkeeper
- Dany Verner (born 1977), Canadian sledge hockey player
- Dany Wilson (1982–2011), Jamaican male volleyball player

=== Other uses of the name ===
- Dany (comics) (born 1943), the pseudonym of Daniel Henrotin, a Belgian comics artist
- Vichara Dany, Cambodian actress who debuted in 1967

== Arts, entertainment, and media ==
- Dany (film), a 2001 Indian Malayalam film
- Daenerys Targaryen, nicknamed Dany, a character from the fantasy series A Song of Ice and Fire and its TV adaptation Game of Thrones

== See also ==
- Dani (disambiguation)
- Danny (disambiguation)
