= Locati =

Locati is a surname. Notable people with the surname include:

- Dany Locati (born 1977), Italian skeleton racer
- Luigi Locati (1928–2005), Italian Catholic missionary and bishop
- Sebastiano Giuseppe Locati (1861–1939), Italian architect
- Umberto Locati (1503–1587), Italian Roman Catholic prelate and Bishop
