= Maihar Band =

Classical instrumental band from Central India

The Maihar Band is an instrumental musical group in the Indian city of Maihar that performs both Indian and western music. After an epidemic orphaned many children, Allauddin Khan, a musician of the Maihar court who was moved by the tragedy, taught them how to play music and formed an orchestral group later known as the Maihar Band. The ruling prince, Braj Nath Singh, cooperated and helped Allauddin Khan in procuring and preparing required instruments.

== Artists and instruments ==
Baba (as the musician was lovingly referred to) tested each student and trained them to play a particular instrument. He used jal tarang initially, but replaced it with Nal-tarang. Apart from the usual instruments like the tabla, dholak, harmonium and sitar, he used some special creations—the saranga and sitar-banjo. He trained some of the children to play western instruments including the piano, violin and cello with equal ease. In the royal palace, arrangements were made for the band and they played for visiting dignitaries from the gallery above the main hall.

== First Indian classical band ==
Baba created several bandishes (compositions) based on Indian Ragas. He also taught western tunes to his students so that Europeans visiting the Court could be entertained. He started with eighteen artists. The band kept to the same number although after retirements, only ten artists remain. Some of them gave solo recitals.

== Present and future ==
The band is associated with Department of Culture in Madhya Pradesh and the artists are government employees. They perform at occasions in Maihar and sometimes in other cities. Their participation in Lata Mangeshar Award Ceremony at Indore in 2005 brought them acclaim and the state government gave them a prominent place in its jubilee celebrations.
