= Tecchio =

Tecchio is an Italian surname. Notable people with the surname include:

- Alan Tecchio, American singer
- Andrea Tecchio (born 1987), Italian footballer
- Marco Tecchio (born 1994), Italian cyclist
- Sebastiano Tecchio (1807–1886), Italian lawyer and politician
