= Danni =

Danni is a given name. Notable people with the name include:

- Danni Ashe (born 1968), American model, dancer and pornographic actress
- Danni Barry, Northern Irish chef
- Danni Bassan (born 1955), Israeli musician
- Danni Boatwright (born 1975), American beauty pageant winner and television personality
- Danni Carlos (born 1975), Brazilian composer, musician, singer and actress
- Danni Chong (born 1989), Chinese actress
- Danni Jensen (born 1989), Danish footballer
- Danni König (born 1986), Danish footballer
- Danni Leigh (born 1970), American singer
- Danni Miatke (born 1987), Australian swimmer
- Danni Roche (born 1970), Australian field hockey player
- Danni Xtravaganza (1961–1996)

== Fictional characters ==
- Danni Stark, a character in the Australian soap opera Neighbours

== See also ==
- Danni Lowinski, a German television series
- Dani (disambiguation)
- Danielle
