= Milan Exposition Elevated Railway =

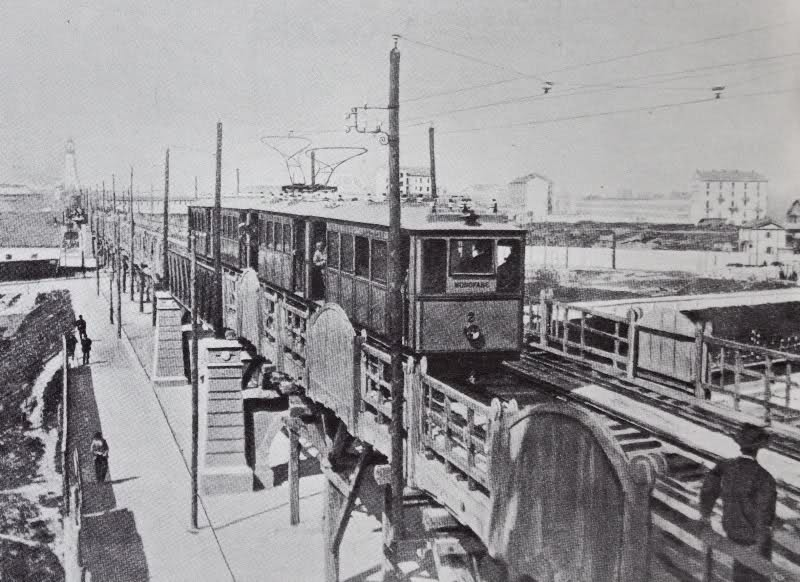

Overview
- Locale: Milan, Italy
- Stations: 2

Service
- Type: Elevated Railway

History
- Opened: 1906
- Closed: 1906

Technical
- Line length: 1.35 km (0.84 mi)

Route map

The Milan Exposition Elevated Railway (Italian: Ferrovia sopraelevata dell'Esposizione di Milano) was a temporary elevated railway in Milan, Italy, constructed for the 1906 World's Fair. The railway connected two venues of the exposition: Parco Sempione and Piazza d'Armi (now the site of CityLife). The railway operated for entire duration of the exposition, from 29 April until 11 November.

The railway was double-tracked and ran along a 1,350 m (4,430 ft)-long wood viaduct. Railcars were electrified by overhead wires and ran at a maximum speed of 40 km (25 mi) an hour.
