= Anayampatti S. Ganesan =

Kalaimamani Anayampatti S. Ganesan
- Born: 22 May 1932 (age 94); Chennai, India
- Origin: Tamil Nadu, India
- Occupations: Musician, vocalist, violinist
- Instruments: Jal tarang, Violin, Voice
- Award: Kalaimamani (1992)

Anayampatti S. Ganesan (born 22 May 1932) is a Carnatic musician from South India. He was born in Chennai.

Ganesan, who lives in Chennai, plays the jal tarang or jalatharangam in concerts throughout Southern India, and is also a Carnatic vocalist and violinist. Ganesan took to jalatharangam on the demise of his accomplished brother Anayampatti Dhandapani and little brother Wan Toe Ceevi. He is among the very few contemporary artistes to play Carnatic music on jalatharangam — his was the sole jalatharangam performance during Madras' 2005–2006 concert season. His jal tarang is "a set of 19 antique porcelain bowls" and was gifted to Ganesan's father, Subbaiyer, in 1890 by Kundrakudi Krishna Iyer, an artiste who played jalatharangam in the court of the king of Ramnad.

== Awards ==
- 1992: Received title of Kalaimamani Award by the Government of Tamil Nadu, which is the highest state honour in the field of Arts
