= Milan International =

World's fair held in Milan, Italy

Esposizione Internazionale del Sempione
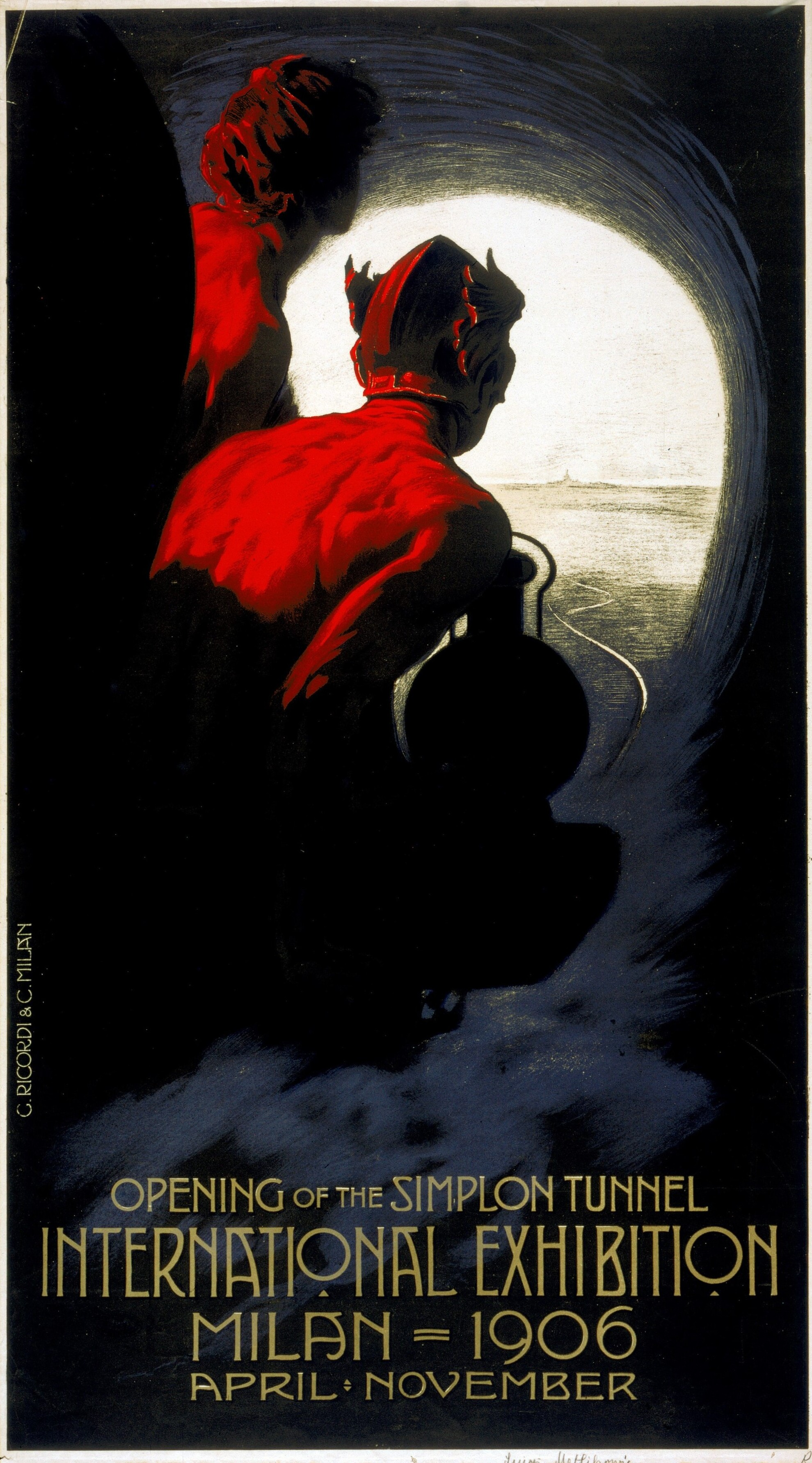
- Leopoldo Metlicovitz's Expo's poster with railwaymen watching Milan from the Simplon Tunnel's portal

Overview
- BIE-class: Universal exposition
- Category: Historical Expo
- Name: Esposizione Internazionale del Sempione
- Building(s): Simplon Tunnel
- Area: 100 Ha
- Visitors: 7,500,000 – 10,000,000

Participant(s)
- Countries: 40

Location
- Country: Italy
- City: Milan
- Venue: Parco Sempione
- Coordinates: 45°28′22.4″N 9°10′28″E

Timeline
- Opening: 28 April 1906
- Closure: 11 November 1906

Universal expositions
- Previous: Liège International (1905) in Liège
- Next: Brussels International 1910 in Brussels

Simultaneous
- Other: International Exhibition (1906)

The Milan International was a world's fair held in Milan in 1906 titled L'Esposizione Internazionale del Sempione, or sometimes The Great Expo of Work. The exhibition took place between April 28 and November 11, 1906, and was held to celebrate the opening of the Simplon Tunnel. Focused on transport, it showcased technological advancements like electric railways, automobiles and airships, attracting 40 countries, over 35,000 exhibitors, and 4,012,776 visitors. The event covered roughly 1 million square meters (about 250 acres). It was the first world's fair held in Italy and solidified Milan as a leading European industrial hub.

== Background ==
The first ideas for an international exposition in Milan date back to 1902 and were intended to celebrate the construction of the Simplon Tunnel. Excavated beneath the Alps and spanning 19,800 metres, it remained the world's longest railway tunnel for the next 76 years. The event, originally scheduled for 1905, the expected completion date of the tunnel, was later postponed due to delays in its construction. An ad hoc citizens' committee identified the area behind the Sforza Castle (which would later be named Parco Sempione) as the location where the bulk of the event would take place. A public subscription was then launched to raise the necessary funds. Within days of the inauguration, the considerable sum of six million lire had been raised. The Milan International Exposition was solemnly inaugurated on April 28, 1906, by the king of Italy Victor Emmanuel III and closed on November 11 of the same year with a procession of lights. The inauguration symbolically coincided with the laying of the foundation stone of the new Milano Centrale railway station, which was completed twenty-five years later.

== Themes ==
The chosen theme was transport, in celebration of the Simplon Tunnel, which had been inaugurated in February 1905 and from which the Exposition drew its name and inspiration. The president of the 1906 International Exposition was the Milanese financier and banker Cesare Mangili (1850–1917).

13 million lire were invested for the occasion, and 225 new buildings were constructed, including the civic aquarium, the only building not demolished and still standing today, along with the Umanitaria pavilion, designed by Luigi Conconi and moved to Anzola d'Ossola in 1911. Forty countries participated, including France, Germany, Austria-Hungary, Greece, Mexico, the United States, Russia, Great Britain, Switzerland, Japan, and Spain. There were 35,000 exhibitors, and visitors were estimated at more than 5 million, a record for the time.

The official logo of the exposition, selected through a competition, was by the Trieste artist Leopoldo Metlicovitz and represented an allegory of technical-scientific progress. The poster celebrated the opening of the Simplon Tunnel, completed in 1905, which made possible the construction of the first direct railway line between Milan and Paris. In Metlicovitz's poster, the god of commerce, Mercury, and the allegory of science, illuminated by the reddish glow of the locomotive's flames, emerge from the tunnel and gaze toward the city of Milan, whose outline is recognizable from the Duomo. The poster was printed by Officine Grafiche Ricordi.

== Site ==
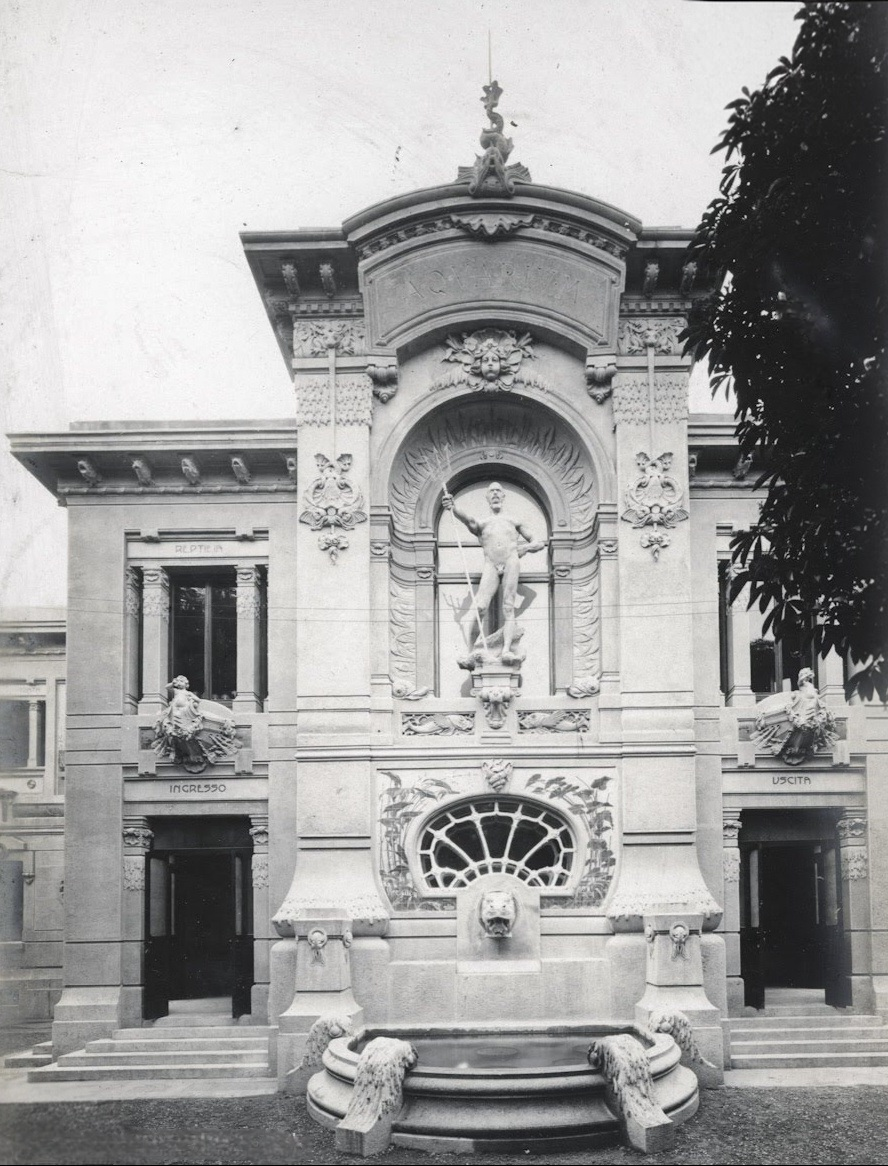
Aquarium built by Brunetti for the Milan International and designed by Sebastiano Giuseppe Locati

The exhibition site was divided into two zones, one in Parco Sempione and one in the Piazza d'Armi, the site on which the Fiera Milano would be built in 1923. The general layout of the park area was entrusted to architect Sebastiano Giuseppe Locati, while that of the Piazza d'Armi was entrusted to architect Giuseppe Sommaruga. The total area occupied was approximately one million square meters, on which pavilions and other structures stood, covering approximately 280,000 square meters, more than double the amount made available for the exposition held in Liège the previous year.

The entrance to the fair, located in Sempione Park, reproduced in full size the entrance to the new Simplon tunnel, designed by the architect Locati. The exhibition showcased the most recent developments in transportation from around the world. It featured a balloon park and an aviation section showcasing several airships. One pavilion was dedicated to the emerging automobile, and another to the railway. While primarily focused on land and sea transport (railways, automobiles, shipping), it also covered agriculture, arts, and industry. There were three movie theaters, including one by the Pathé Frères. The fine art's section primarily featured Italian artists and included works by Angelo Morbelli, Plinio Nomellini and Giulio Aristide Sartorio.

== Summary ==
Art Nouveau Silver Medallion by Giannino Castiglioni to the Milan International (1906). The South Portal of the Simplon Tunnel is on the obverse.

The fair opened on 28 April 1906, ran until 31 October and marked the opening of the Simplon Tunnel. The fair was held in Sempione Park and Piazza d'Armi, with the first location hosting fine arts displays and the latter industrial and engineering exhibits, along with the foreign pavilions. The venues of the exposition were connected by the temporary Milan Exposition Elevated Railway. The railway was double-tracked and ran along a 1,350 m (4,430 ft)-long wood viaduct. Railcars were electrified by overhead wires and ran at a maximum speed of 40 km (25 mi) an hour. The fair comprised 200 stands and attracted around 5 million visitors from across the globe.

Countries contributing included many from Western Europe, China, Japan, Ottoman Empire, Morocco, Egypt, United States, Canada and several South American countries. A lavish pavilion was dedicated to the Italian colony of Eritrea. Designed in the style of Eritrean architecture, it allowed visitors to feel like tourists in the African country. The pavilion was divided into two sections: the first showcasing products from Eritrea, and the second showcasing products imported from Italy. It included a recreation of an Eritrean village, home to around 100 Eritreans and various Eritrean animals, including dromedaries and elephants.

== Legacy ==
The International Commission on Occupational Health was founded at the Milan International and is still active. Almost all of the structures and infrastructure were dismantled, as it was common practice at the time for international exhibitions. Only the Milan aquarium, one of the city's most significant liberty style buildings, is still standing. At the Museo Nazionale Scienza e Tecnologia Leonardo da Vinci in Milan a pavilion is preserved and used nowadays to display historical trains.

== Views of the Exposition ==
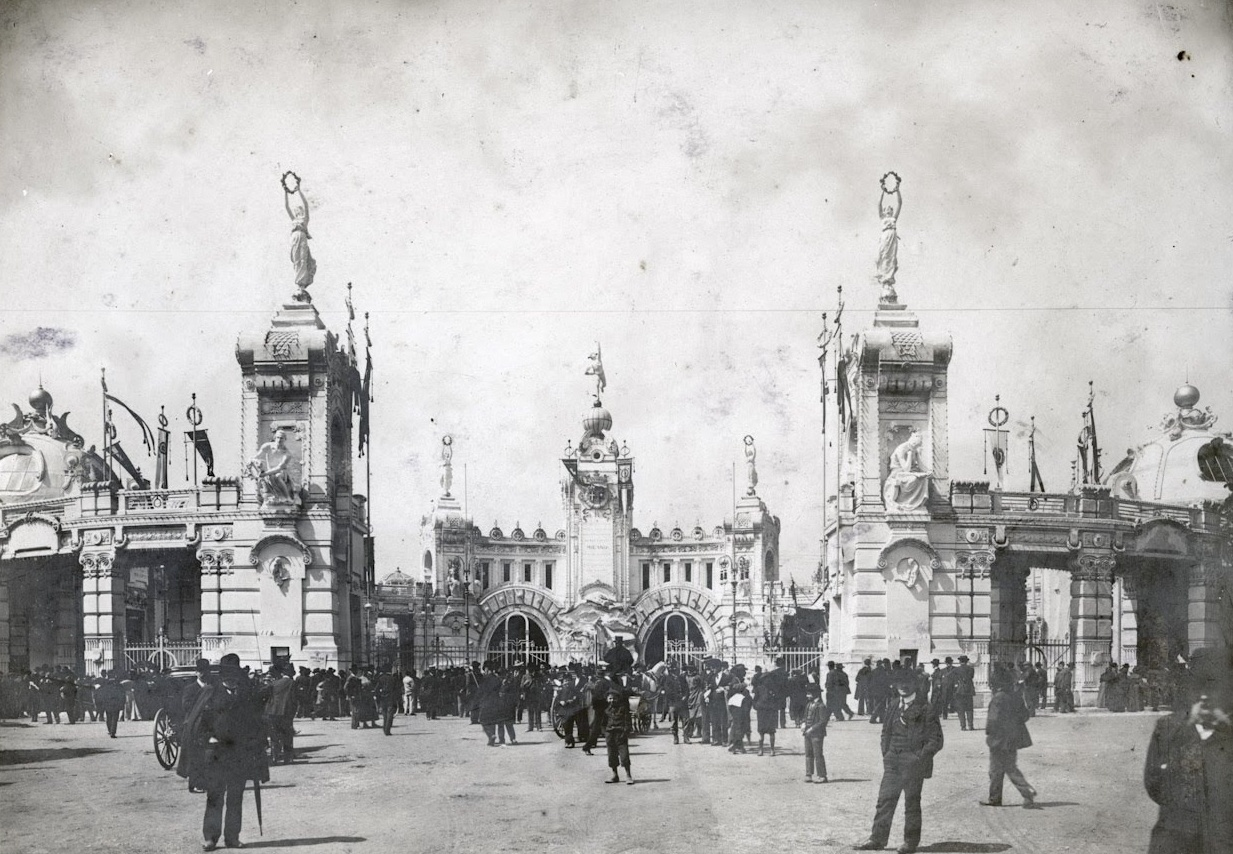
The main entrance to the exhibition

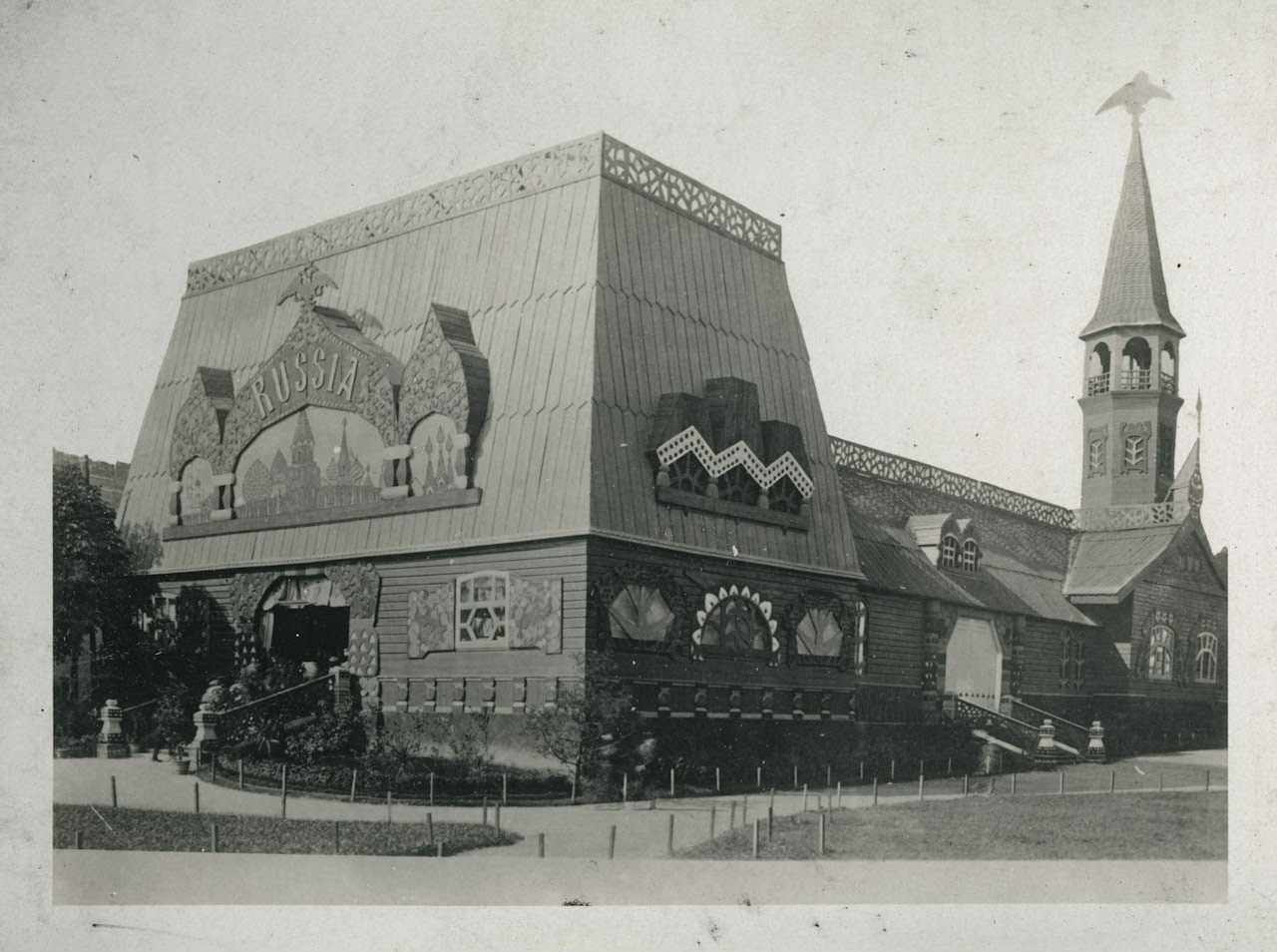
Exterior of the Russian pavilion

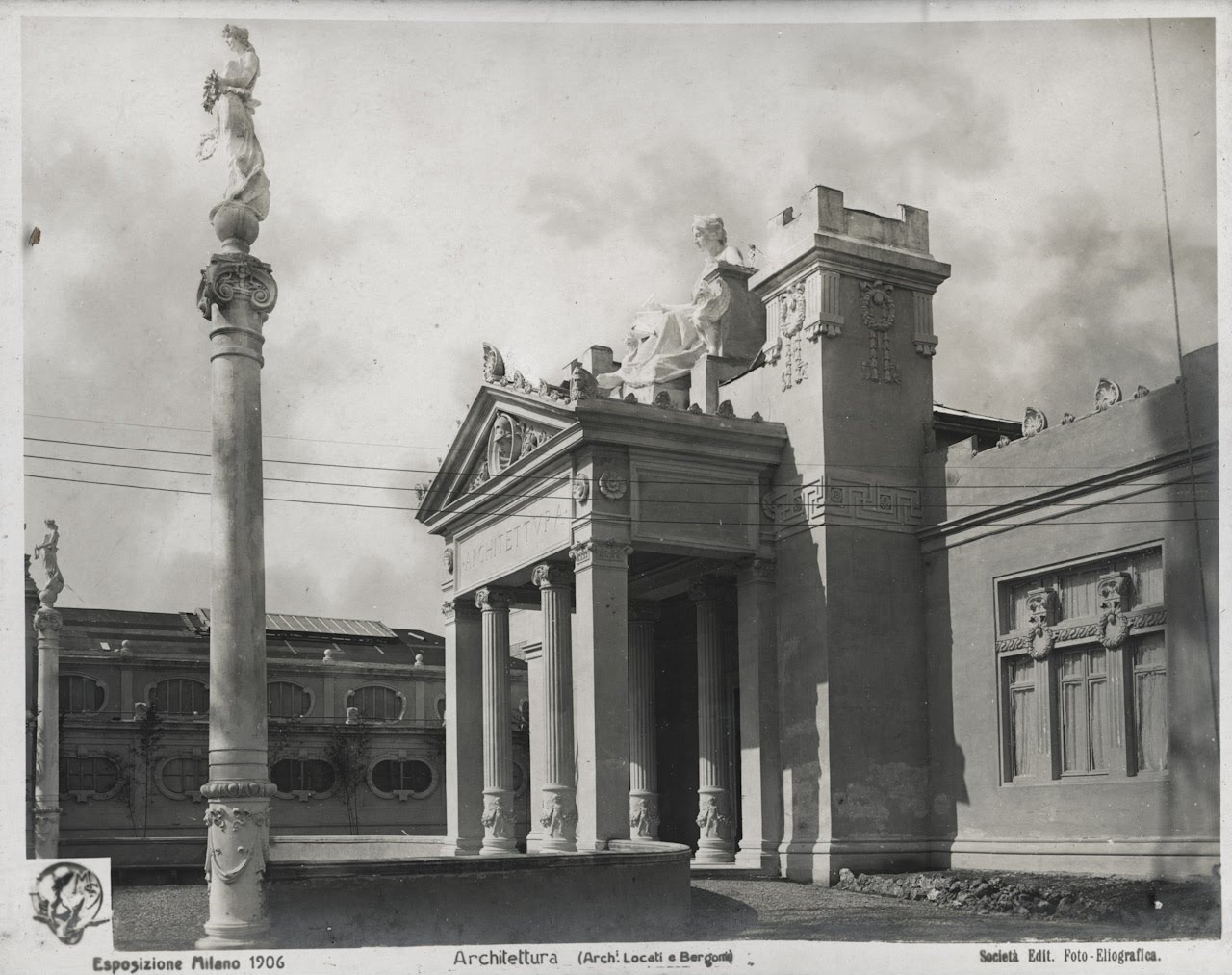
Exterior of the pavilion of architecture

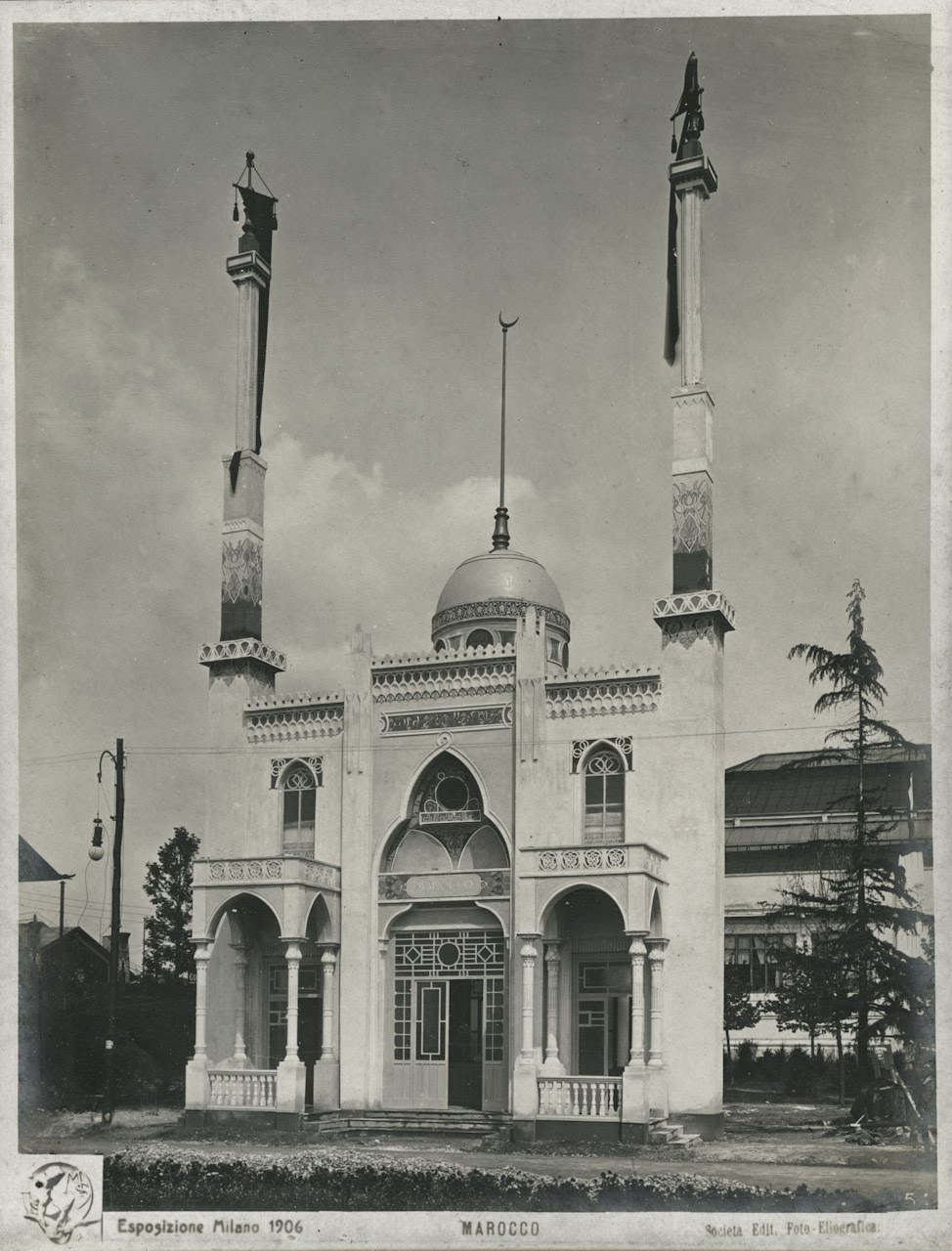
Exterior of the Moroccan pavilion

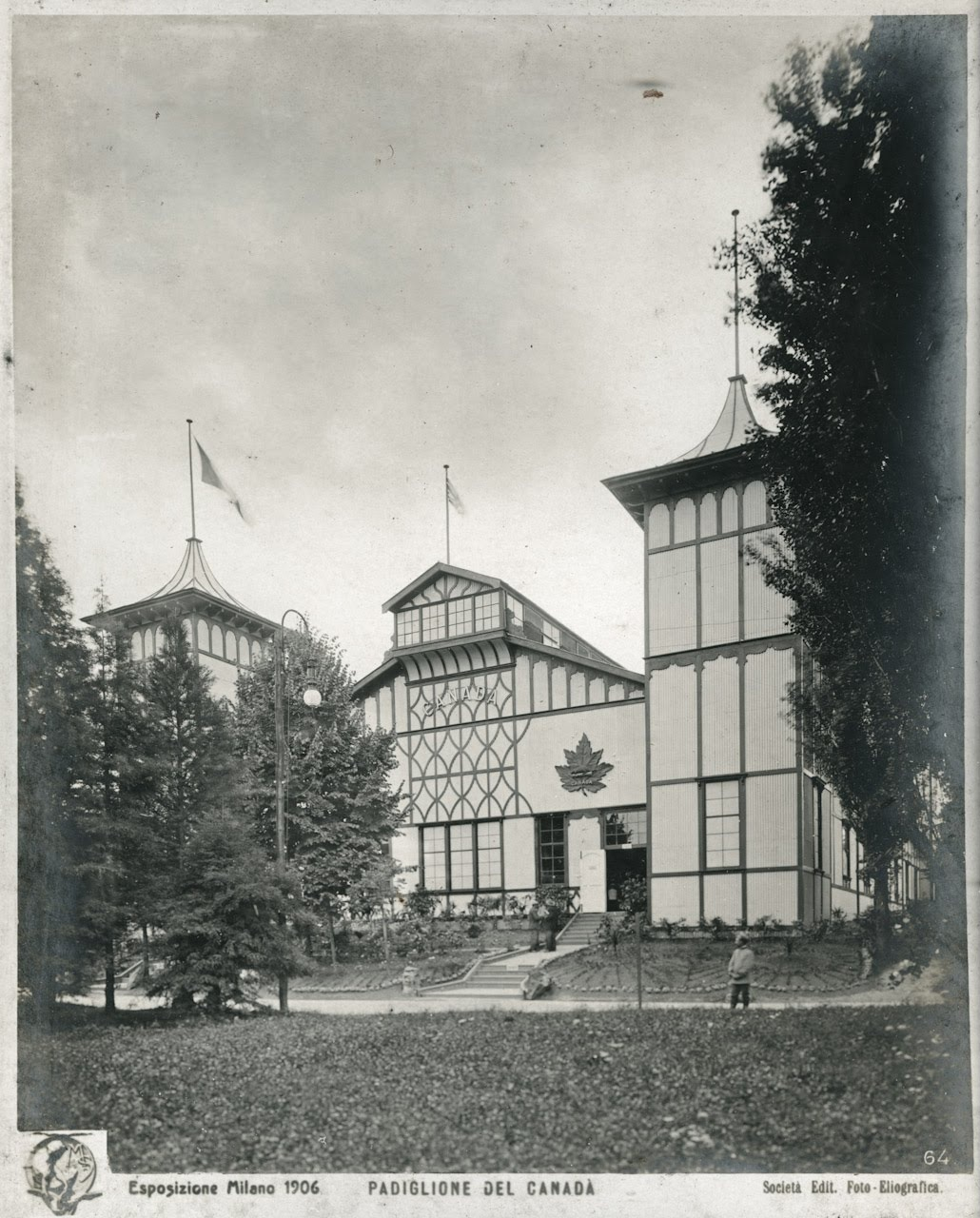
Exterior of the Canadian pavilion

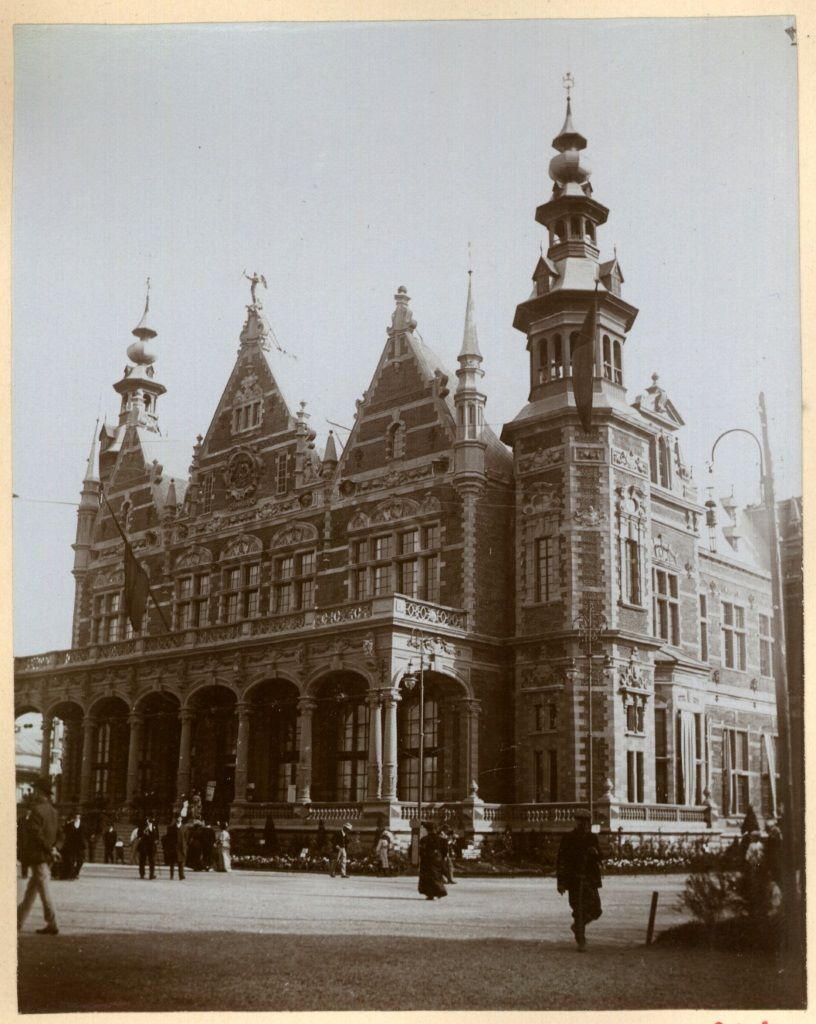
Exterior of the Belgian pavilion

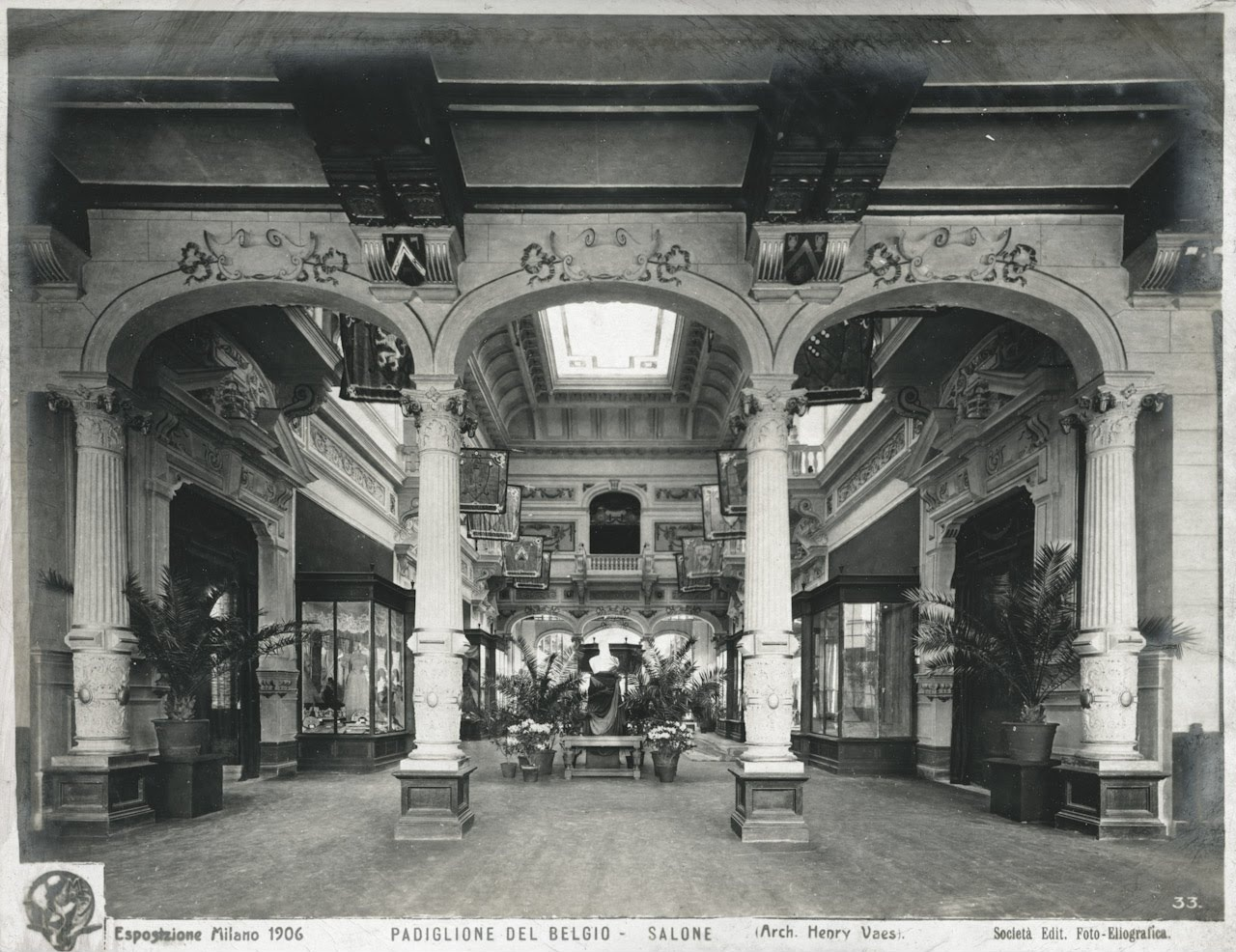
Interior of the Belgian pavilion

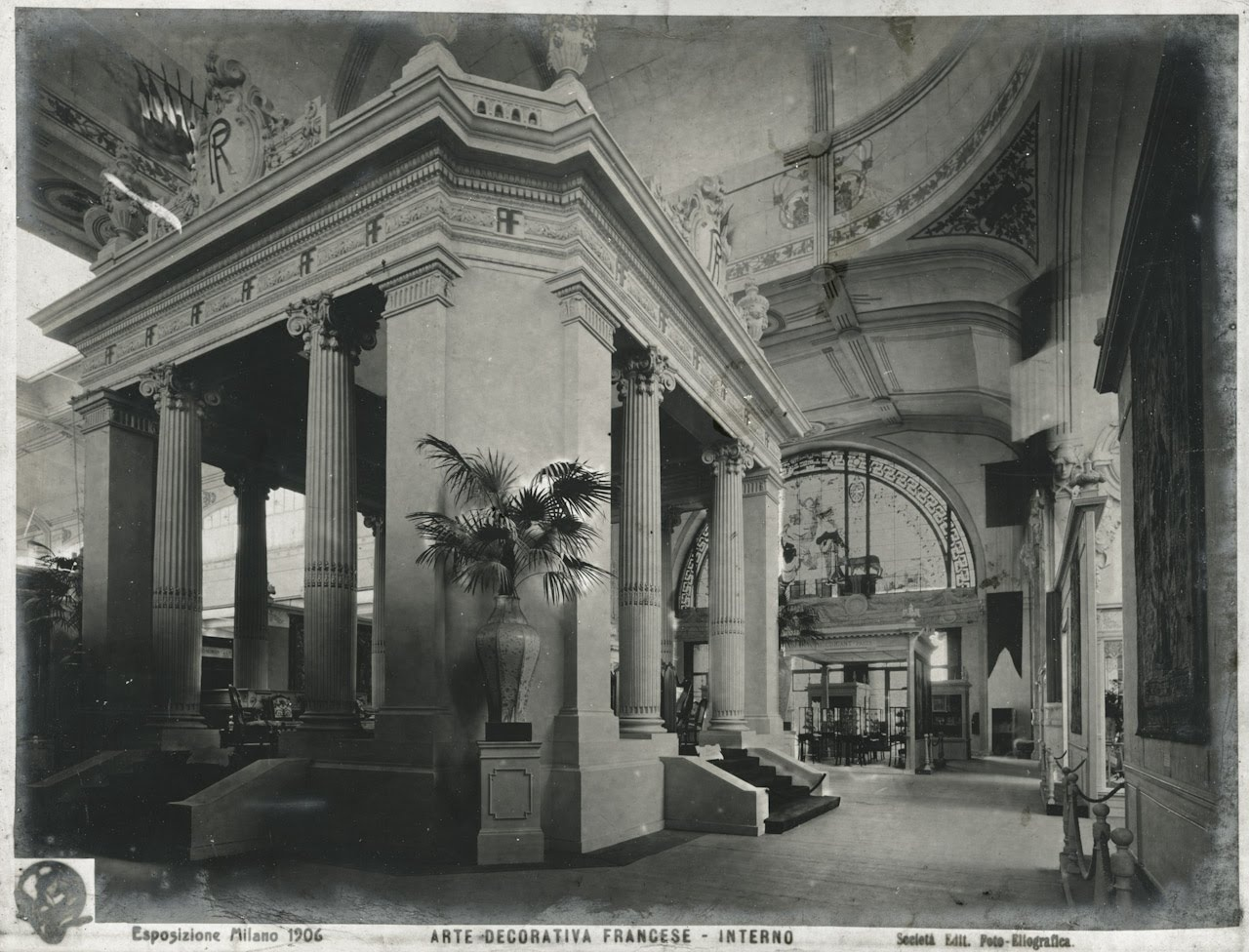
Interior of the pavilion of French decorative art

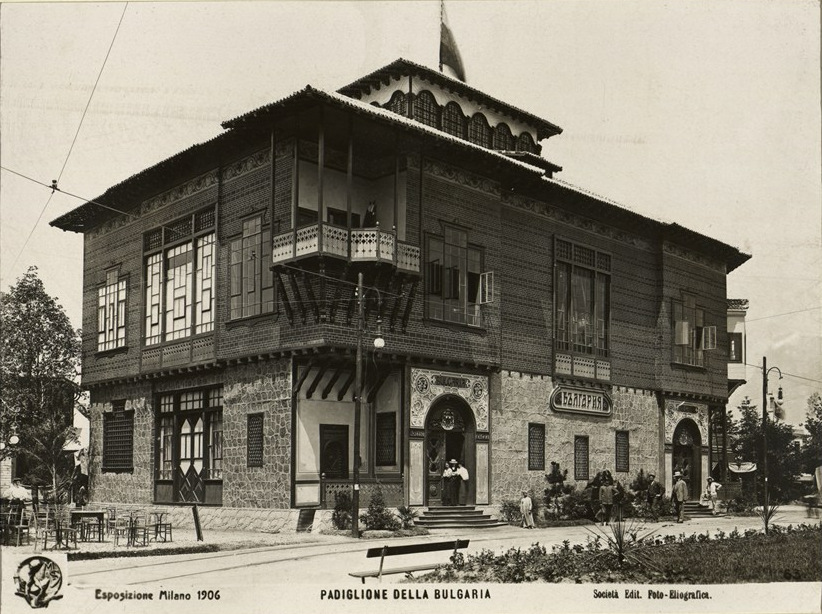
Exterior of the Bulgarian pavilion

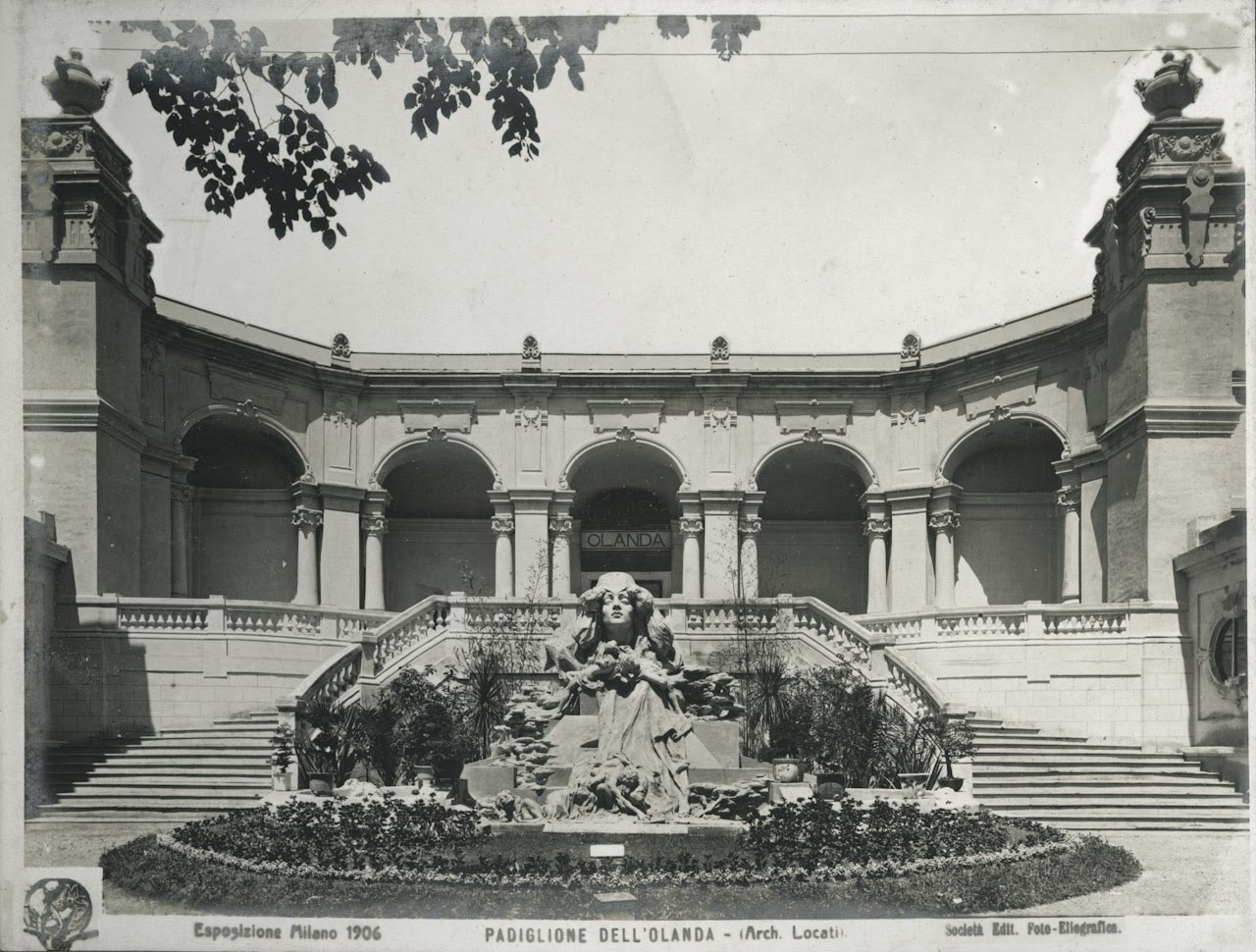
Exterior of the Dutch pavilion

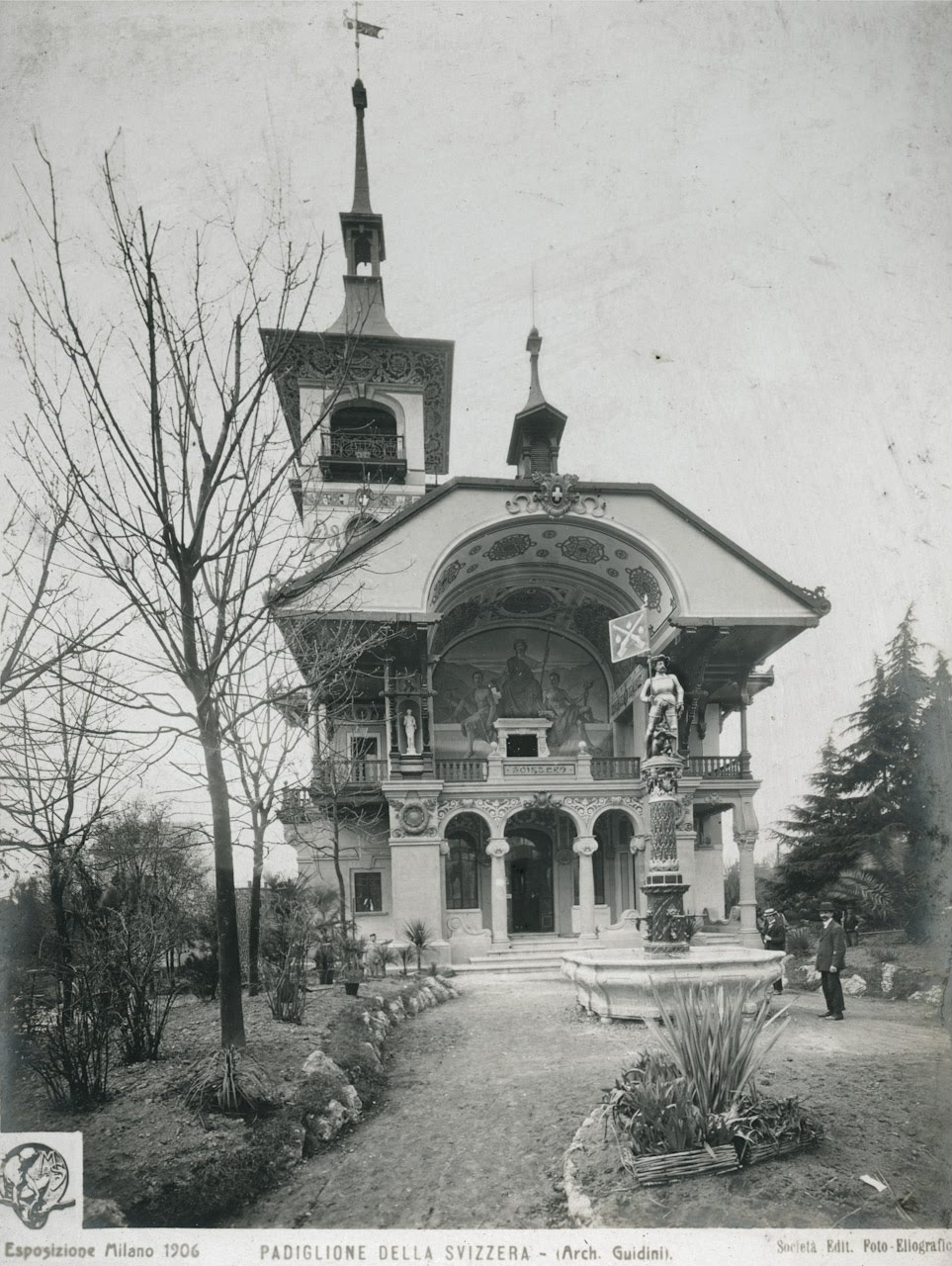
Exterior of the Swiss pavilion

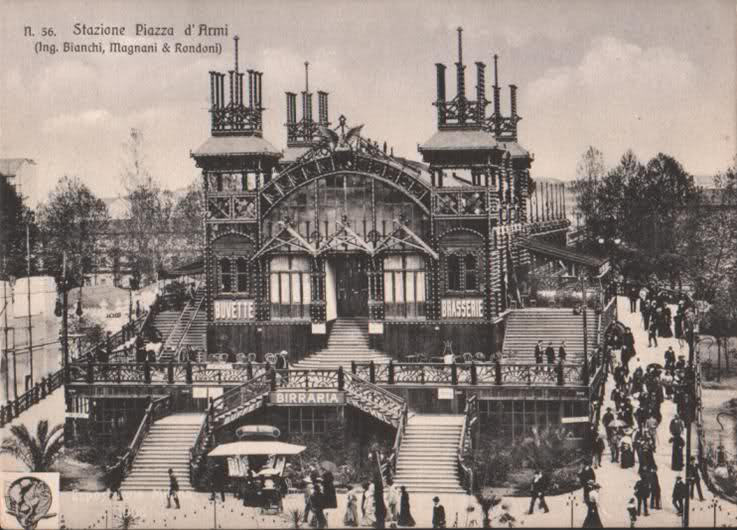
Station of the Milan Exposition Elevated Railway

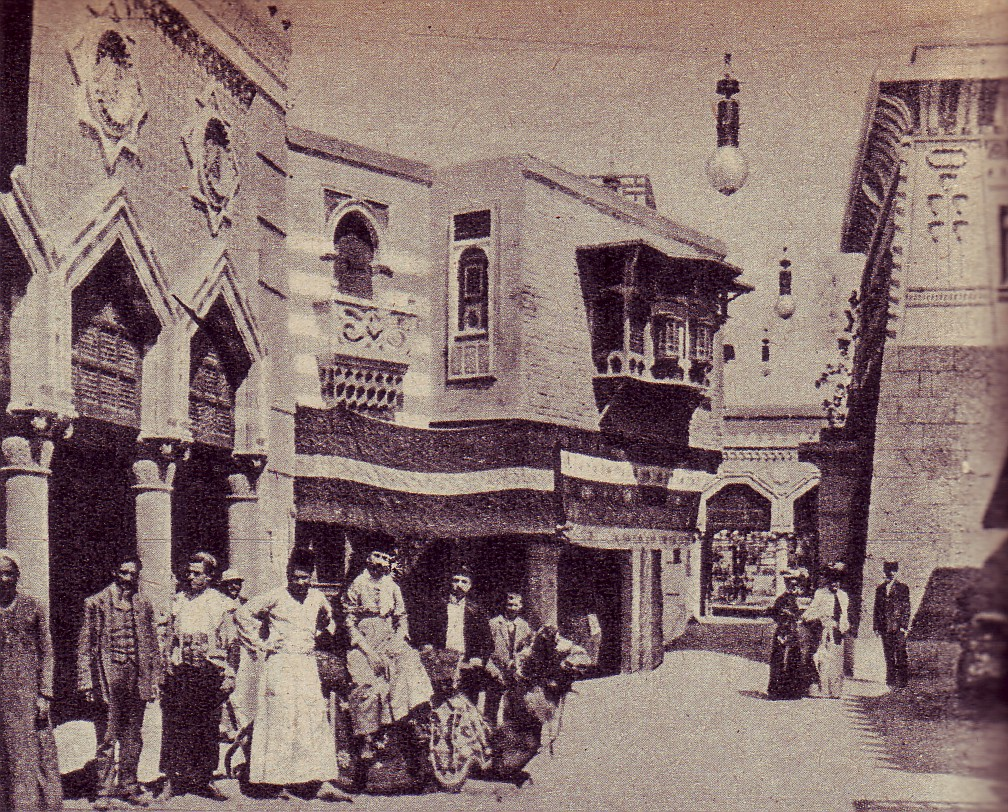
Entrance to the 'Egyptian Village'

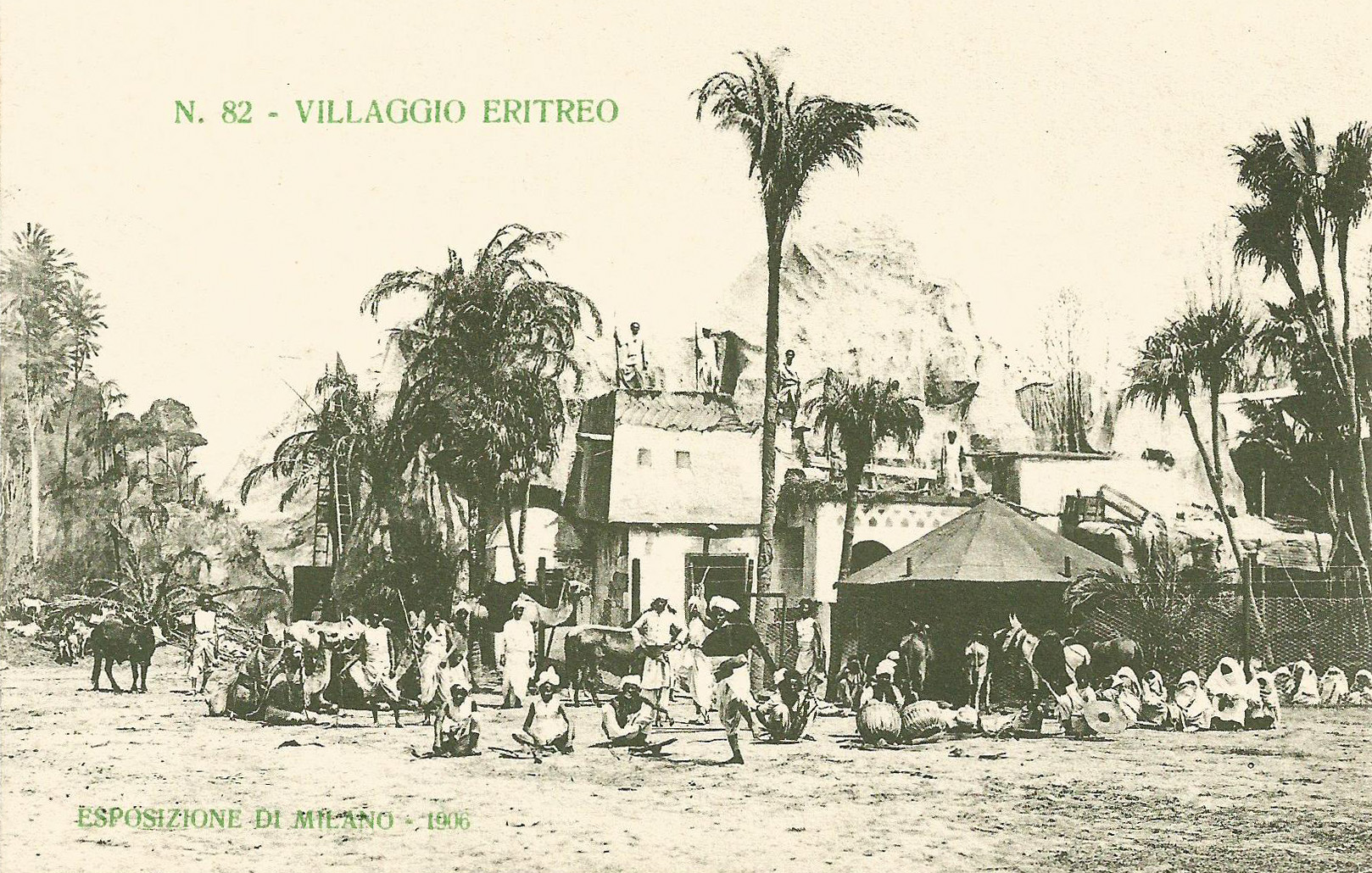
The 'Eritrean Village'
