= Stefano Mazzocco =

Italian footballer

Personal information
- Date of birth: 13 April 1980 (age 46)
- Place of birth: Arzignano, Italy
- Height: 1.79 m (5 ft 10 in)
- Position: Midfielder

Senior career*
Years	Team	Apps	(Gls)
1996–1999	Vicenza	3	(0)
1999–2002	Reggiana	60	(0)
2002–2003	Vicenza	0	(0)
2002–2003	→ Thiene (loan)	23	(0)
2003–2006	Cittadella	75	(1)
2006–2009	Padova	36	(0)
2009	→ Monza (loan)	7	(0)
2010–2011	Pavia	19	(0)
2011	Pro Vercelli	7	(0)
- * Club domestic league appearances and goals

Stefano Mazzocco (born 13 April 1980) is an Italian former professional football player.

He played 2 seasons (3 games) in the Serie A for Vicenza.

== Honours ==
- Coppa Italia winner: 1996–97.
