= Arzignano =

- Comune
- Città di Arzignano
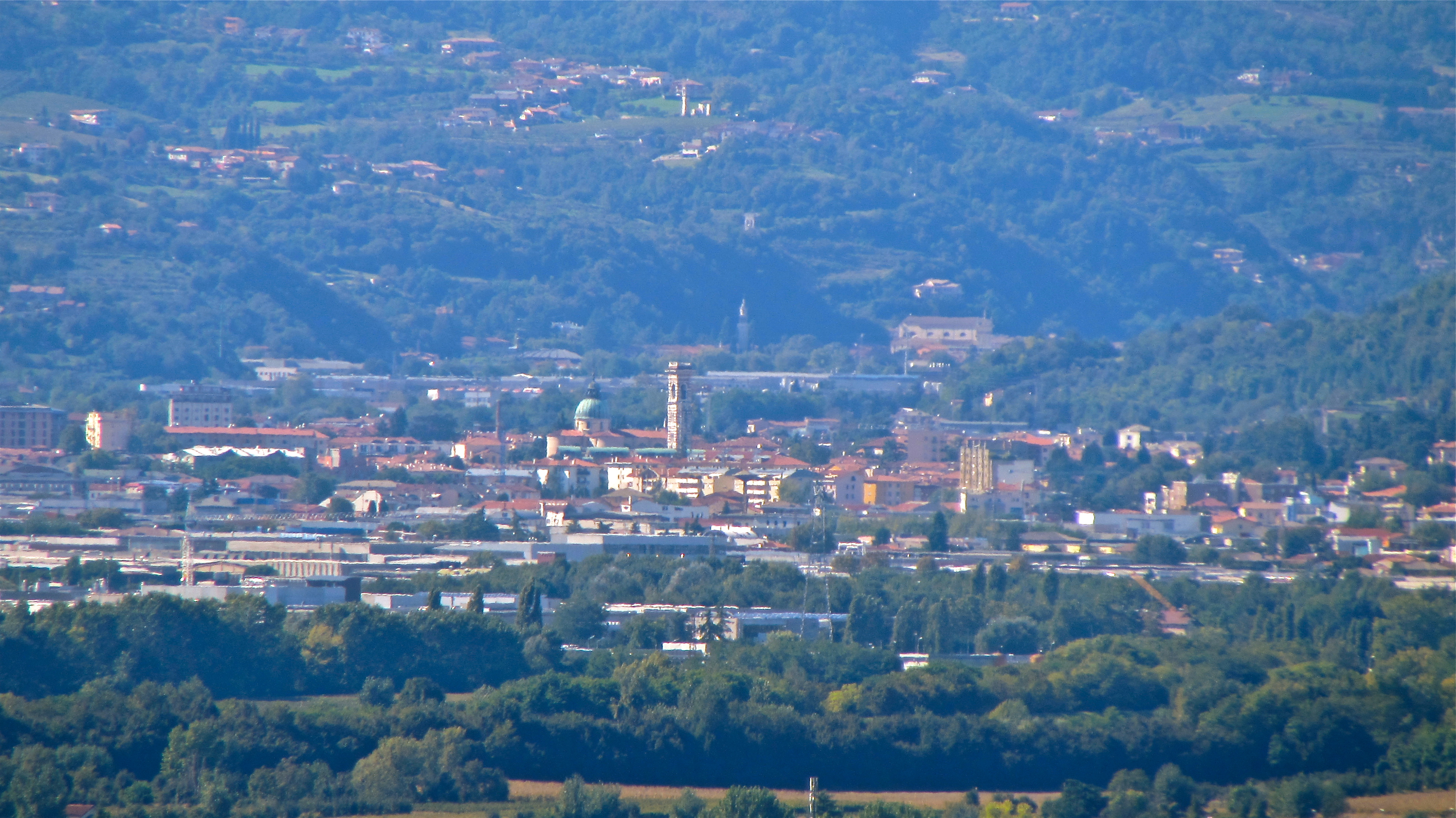
- View of Arzignano

- Coat of arms

- Location of Arzignano in Italy Arzignano (Veneto)
- Coordinates: 45°31′N 11°20′E
- Country: Italy
- Region: Veneto
- Province: Vicenza (VI)
- Frazioni: Costo, Pugnello, Castello, Restena, San Bortolo, San Zenone, Tezze

Government
  - Mayor: Teresa Inglese prefectural commissioner

Area
  - Total: 34 km^{2} (13 sq mi)
- Elevation: 118 m (387 ft)

Population (30 April 2017)
  - Total: 25,642
  - Density: 750/km^{2} (2,000/sq mi)
- Demonym: Arzignanesi
- Time zone: UTC+1 (CET)
  - Summer (DST): UTC+2 (CEST)
- Postal code: 36071
- Dialing code: 0444
- Patron saint: Ognissanti
- Saint day: November 1
- Website: Official website

Arzignano (IPA: /ardziɲˈɲano/, Arzenjan in venetian dialect) is an industrial town and comune in the Province of Vicenza in Veneto, Italy. It is located c. 23 kilometres (14 mi) from Vicenza, in the Valle del Chiampo.

A local legend states that the name Arzignano derives from the Latin term "Arx Jani" (Temple of Janus), a Roman deity. It is however more likely that Arzignano derives from "Argenius," a noble surname of the Menenia tribe, and that, over time, the suffix -anum (Argenianum) was added, indicating ownership of a farm.

== History ==
The hills surrounding Arzignano have yielded artifacts dating back to the Neolithic period, proving its ancient origins. Arzignano furthermore underwent significant development during the Roman era, due to its strategic location at the mouth of a valley and near a bridge on what is known as the "Venetian Road" that runs from Verona to Friuli. In 1413, during a campaign of King Sigismund of Hungary against the Republic of Venice, its castle was besieged by Hungarian troops under Pippo Spano. In the 1400s, thanks to the richness of the waterways, the wool processing and leather tanning activity developed together with silkworm breeding.

== Main sights ==
- Sanctuary of Santa Maria delle Grazie, built after the plague of 1485.
- Church of Sant'Agata di Tezze, originating in the early 15th century on the site of a chapel.

== Sport ==
The main club of the city, Arzignano Valchiampo, currently plays in Serie C.

== Notable people ==
- Achille Beltrame, painter and illustrator
- Marzia Kjellberg, former YouTube personality, fashion designer, and wife of PewDiePie
- Michele Paco Castagna, international motorcycle speedway rider
- Armando Castagna, former international motorcycle speedway rider
- Filippo Dani, footballer for Arzignano Valchiampo on loan from Juventus
- Angelo Furlan, former professional road bicycle racer
- Alessandra Galiotto, Olympian and sprint canoer
- Luca Ghiotto, racing driver currently competing in the GT World Challenge Europe
- Giuseppe Marzotto, former international motorcycle speedway rider
- Stefano Mazzocco, footballer for Pavia
- Paolo Negro, retired football player and manager
- Mattia Sandrini, footballer for Real Vicenza on loan from Parma
- Andrea Tecchio, footballer for Rovigo Calcio on loan from L.R. Vicenza Virtus
- Delfo Zorzi, Italian-born Japanese neo-fascist and acquitted suspect in Piazza Fontana bombing
