= Jal tarang =

Indian melodic percussion instrument

Jaltarang
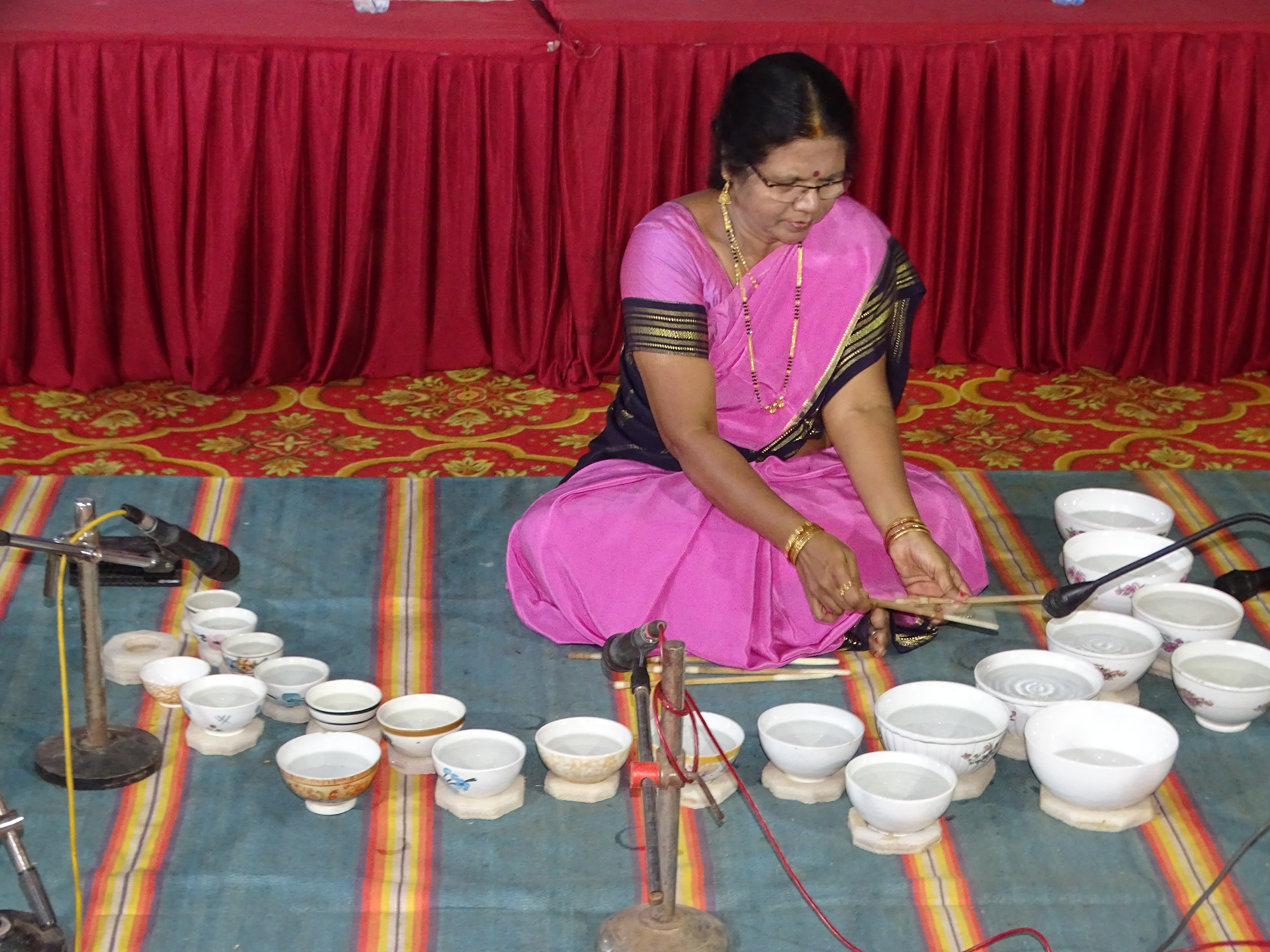
- Vidushi Shashikala Dani playing the jalatarang

Percussion instrument
- Other names: Jaltarang; jal-tarang; jal-yantra, jalatarangam; jalatharangam
- Classification: Percussion
- Hornbostel–Sachs classification: 111.242.11 (Resting bells whose opening faces upward)
- Developed: 4th–6th centuries CE

Musicians
- Seetha Doraiswamy; Shashikala Dani; Anayampatti S. Ganesan

The jal tarang (Hindi: जलतरंग) is a melodic percussion instrument that originates from the Indian subcontinent. It consists of a set of ceramic or metal bowls filled with water. The bowls are played by striking the edge with beaters, one in each hand.

== History ==
The earliest mention of the jal tarang is found in Vatsyayana's Kamasutra, as playing on musical glasses filled with water. Jal tarang was also mentioned in the medieval Sangeet Parijaat text, which categorized the instrument under Ghan-Vadya (idiophonic instruments in which sound is produced by striking a surface, also called concussion idiophones.) The SangeetSaar text considers 22 bowls to be a complete jal tarang and 15 to be of mediocre status. The bowls, of varying sizes, are made of either bronze or porcelain. Jal tarang was also called jal-yantra in medieval times, and poets of the Krishna cult (also called Ashtachhap poets) have mentioned the instrument.

== Details ==
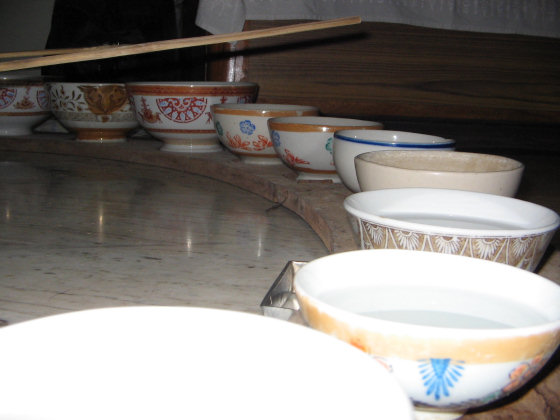
Porcelain jal tarang bowls

Water is poured into the bowls, and the pitch is changed by adjusting the volume of water. The number of bowls depends on the melody being played. The bowls are mostly arranged in a semicircle in front of the player, who can then reach them all easily. The player softly hits the edges of the bowls with a wooden stick to produce sound.

== See also ==
- Water drum
- Hydraulophone
