= Peter Dani =

American soccer player

Personal information
- Date of death: June 1, 2002
- Place of death: Duesseldorf, Germany
- Position: Midfielder

Senior career*
Years	Team	Apps	(Gls)
1975–1976	Fortuna Düsseldorf		

International career
1976	United States MNT	2	(0)
- * Club domestic league appearances and goals

Peter Dani was a U.S. soccer player who earned two caps with the U.S. national team in 1976. Both games were scoreless ties with Haiti in November. The first came on the eleventh, and the second three days later.

Dani signed with German side Fortuna Düsseldorf.

Peter Dani died on 1 June 2002 from an accident in Duesseldorf, Germany.
