= Chong Danni =

Chinese actress

- Born: September 11, 1989 (age 36); Shenyang, China
- Education: Beijing Film Academy
- Occupation: Actress
- Years active: 2012–present
- Agent: Beijing Guoli Changsheng Entertainment Group

Chong Danni is a Chinese actress. She is known for her role in fantasy romance comedy series, Cinderella Chef.

== Early life and education ==
Chong Danni was born in Shenyang, Liaoning Province. To pursue a singing career, she moved to Beijing and attended China Conservatory of Music Affiliated High School at age 15. After high school however, realizing her true passion is acting rather than singing folk music, she secretly and successfully applied to Beijing Film Academy against the wishes of her mother. After completing her undergraduate studies at Beijing Film Academy in 2012, Danni pursued a master's degree from Beijing Film Academy on a full scholarship while also participating in many acting and singing projects.

== Acting career ==
During Danni second year at Beijing Film Academy, she was offered a major role in the television series Foster Father, produced by and co-starring Chinese entertainment mogul Zhang Guoli. The series was a rating success, and Danni's performance in the series also garnered her wide critical acclaim, including a 2011 Sohu Best New Actress in Television nomination. Impressed by her potential as an actress, Zhang Guoli subsequently signed her to his talent agency.

== Filmography ==
=== Film ===
Year	English title	Chinese title	Role	Notes
2011	Old Home New Home	老家新家	Meimei	
2013	Youthful Days	青春雷锋	Liu Hong	
2020	Novoland: The Castle in the Sky - Time Reversal	九州天空城之时光回转	Hong Luan	

=== Television series ===
Year	English title	Chinese title	Role	Notes
2010	Foster Father	养父	Lou Xiaoyu	
2011		叶落长安	He Yulan	
2012	Two Happy Families	婆媳拼图	An Xiaoxue	
2013		像小朵一样	Xiaoduo	
2014	Theater	剧场	Du Xiaohong	
2014		血色迷情	Xian'er	
2016	Legend of Jigong	济公传	Yang Qingxue	
2016		龙器	Jin Yanran	
2016	Why Get Married	结婚为什么	Shi Yan	
2016	Precious Youth	那年青春我们正好	Han Lu	
2017	A Splendid Life in Beijing	生逢灿烂的日子	Xiao Wei	
2017	Stairway to Stardom	逆袭之星途璀璨	Liu Mengtian	
2017	Mystery Mirrors	迷镜	Lin Qi	
2018	Cinderella Chef	萌妻食神	Ye Jiayao/Ye Jinxuan	
2019	Behind the Scenes	幕后之王	Xingzi	
2021	Faith	信仰		
2021	Love Scenery	良辰美景好时光		
2021	Really Meet Love That Day	当天真遇见爱情		

== Awards and nominations ==
Year	Award	Category	Nominated work	Result	Ref.
2019	4th China Quality Television Drama Ceremony	Newcomer Award	—N/a	Won	
2019	The Third Internet Film Festival	Most Promising Actress	Cinderella Chef	Won	
2019	Golden Bud - The Third Network Film And Television Festival	Most Capable Actress	Cinderella Chef	Won	
