= Andrea Tecchio =

Italian footballer (born 1987)

Personal information
- Date of birth: February 2, 1987 (age 39)
- Place of birth: Arzignano, Italy
- Height: 5 ft 11 in (1.80 m)
- Position: Defender

Senior career*
| Years | Team | Apps | (Gls) |
| 2006–2009 | Vicenza | 2 | (0) |
| 2008–2009 | → Rovigo (loan) | 18 | (1) |
- * Club domestic league appearances and goals as of 13:20, 25 July 2008 (UTC)

Andrea Tecchio (born 2 February 1987) is an Italian footballer.

Capecchi started his career with L.R. Vicenza Virtus in 2006, where he has made two appearances in Serie B.
