= Filippo Dani =

Italian footballer

Personal information
- Date of birth: 27 June 1999 (age 27)
- Place of birth: Arzignano, Italy
- Position: Goalkeeper

Team information
- Current team: Montecchio Maggiore

Youth career
- –2013: Vicenza
- 2014–2016: Juventus
- 2015–2016: → Udinese (loan)

Senior career*
Years	Team	Apps	(Gls)
2016–2018	Juventus	0	(0)
2016–2017	→ Vicenza (loan)	1	(0)
2017–2018	→ Arzignano (loan)	30	(0)
2018	Arzignano	2	(0)
2018–2019	GSD Ambrosiana	14	(0)
2019–	Montecchio Maggiore		
- * Club domestic league appearances and goals as of 23:48, 4 October 2019 (UTC)

Filippo Dani (born 27 June 1999) is an Italian football player who plays for U.C. Montecchio Maggiore.

== Club career ==
He made his professional debut in the Serie B for Vicenza on 25 February 2017 in a game against Avellino.

Ahead of the 2019-20 season, Dani joined U.C. Montecchio Maggiore.
