= Dany Leviatan =

Israeli mathematician

- דני לויתן
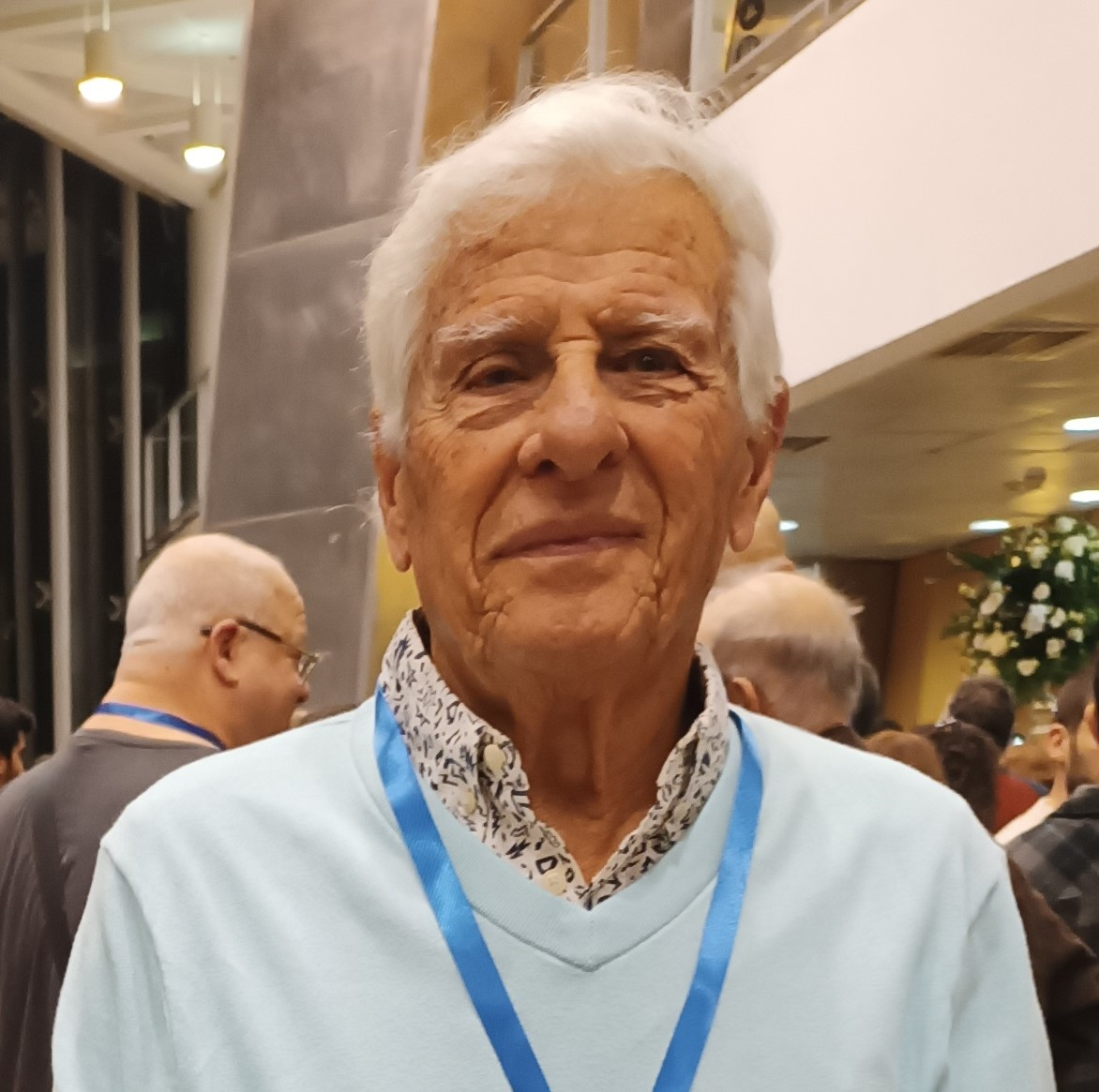
- Born: February 21, 1942 (age 84); Jerusalem, Israel
- Education: Hebrew University of Jerusalem
- Scientific career
- Fields: Approximation theory
- Workplaces: Tel Aviv University
- Thesis: The Moment Problem of Hausdorff and Its Generalizations, Generalized Hausdorff Transformations and Their Properties (1966)
- Doctoral advisor: Amnon Jakimovski

Dany Leviatan (Hebrew: דני לויתן; born 21 February 1942) is an Israeli mathematician and former rector of Tel Aviv University.

== Biography ==
Dany Leviatan completed his B.Sc. and M.Sc. at the Hebrew University of Jerusalem. A participant in the Academic Atuda program, Leviatan served as a mathematician in the Israel Air Force while working on his doctorate at the Hebrew University, which he completed in 1966.

== Academic career ==
He worked as visiting professor at the University of Illinois Urbana-Champaign from 1967 to 1970 through the Fulbright Scholarship Program, and became associate professor at Tel Aviv University in 1972. Leviatan served as head of the university's Department of Mathematics from 1972 to 1974, and dean of the Faculty of Exact Sciences from 1976 to 1980. He became head of the recently established School of Mathematics in 1982.

Leviatan was appointed rector of Tel Aviv University on 16 August 2005, a position he kept until 2010. He briefly served as acting president of the university following the resignation of Zvi Galil in July 2009.

== Selected works ==
- Cohen, Albert; Davenport, Mark A.; Leviatan, Dany (2013). "On the Stability and Accuracy of Least Squares Approximations". Foundations of Computational Mathematics. 13 (5). Springer Nature: 819–834. arXiv:1111.4422. doi:10.1007/s10208-013-9142-3. ISSN 1615-3375. S2CID 12757269.
- Leviatan, D.; Temlyakov, Vladimir N. (2006). "Simultaneous approximation by greedy algorithms". Advances in Computational Mathematics. 25 (1–3). Springer Nature: 73–90. doi:10.1007/s10444-004-7613-4. ISSN 1019-7168. S2CID 9429496.
- DeVore, Ronald A.; Leviatan, Dany; Yu, Xiang Ming (1992). "Polynomial approximation in $L_p$ ($0<p<1$)". Constructive Approximation. 8 (2): 187–201. doi:10.1007/BF01238268. S2CID 122111054.
- Jakimovski, Amnon; Leviatan, Dany (1969). "Generalized Szász operators for the approximation in the finite interval". Mathematica (Cluj). 11 (34): 97–103.

== See also ==
- Dany Leviatan at the Mathematics Genealogy Project
