= Dany Engobo =

Congoloese musician

Dany Engobo is a Congolese musician and leader of Les Coeurs Brises. He started his music career in Brazzaville. He worked with a guitar maestro Diblo Dibala in most of his songs. He moved to Paris in 1976 where he formed his band, Les Coeurs Brises. The band included musicians from France, Algeria, and Israel alongside Congolese dancers who lived in Paris. The group toured across Europe, the United States, and some countries in Africa but never in his home country. He learned French upon his arrival in the country and from then on he started singing his songs in that language. For international purposes, his songs are mostly done in Lingala Language and French.

Engobo and his dancers were one of the bands, amongst others, to popularise the dance style of Ndombolo, which "centres on the movement of the female dancers." The dancers use traditional dancers along with some burlesque elements
