= Sebastiano Giuseppe Locati =

Italian architect (1861–1939)

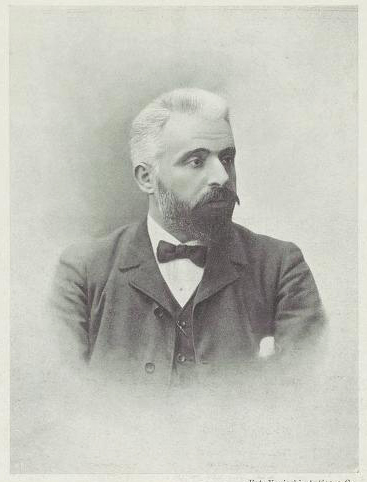
Architect Sebastiano Locati (1862-1939)

Sebastiano Giuseppe Locati (20 January 1861, in Milan – 7 October 1939, in Milan) was an Italian architect. He became famous at the turn of the twentieth century for his efforts in designing structures in eclectic and Art Nouveau styles.

== Life and career ==
Born to Francesco Locati and Angela Fossati, he studied at the Accademia di Brera, where he was a pupil of Camillo Boito and Carlo Formenti. After completing his studies in 1881, he won the Oggioni Competition for a two-year post-graduate course in Rome, after which he moved to Paris, where he enrolled in the Académie des Beaux-Arts and where he updated his artistic knowledge, nurturing his eclectic taste.

His career began in 1885 when he collaborated as an assistant with Luca Beltrami and Giovanni Ceruti in designing the Sartorelli house on the via Torino in Milan. [2] There, Locati built several eclectic buildings for private clients, including the Casa Rigamonti at 24 via Solferino (1889–90), the Casa dei fratelli Reininghaus (later raised) on the Corso Genova at the corner of the Piazzale Cantore (1895–96), and the house of the sculptor Odoardo Tabacchi (1902). [3]

In 1899 he obtained an appointment as a professor at the University of Pavia, where he taught decoration and architecture, architectural composition and practical architecture until 1935. He also held the post of commissioner of the Conservative Commission of Monuments for Lombardy under the direction of the architect Gaetano Moretti.

Locati reached the peak of his professional career in 1906, when he was in charge of the general artistic direction of the section set up at the Parco Sempione of the great Milan International Exhibition, dedicated to the opening of the new Simplon railway tunnel. For the fair he designed the main entrance with an elliptical configuration with the reproduction of the two entrances to the tunnel, some pavilions, the entrance and pavilion of the National Exhibition of Fine Arts and the Aquarium building, in which the references to the Vienna Secession are clearly evident.

He is buried at the Cimitero Monumentale di Milano in Milan.

== Bibliography ==
- G.L. Ciagà, ed., Archivi di architettura in Lombardia. Censimento delle fonti, edito dal Centro di Alti Studi sulle Arti Visive, con la collaborazione della Soprintendenza archivistica della Lombardia e del Politecnico di Milano, 2003.
- Sergio Coradeschi, Carlo G. Lacaita, Andrea Silvestri eds., Il Politecnico di Milano. Una scuola nella formazione della società industriale. 1863-1914. Milan: Electa, 1981.* Luisa Erba, "Il neogotico nell’insegnamento degli ingegneri nell’Università di Pavia a cavallo tra Ottocento e Novecento: Giuseppe Sebastiano Locati," in Rossana Bossaglia and Valerio Terraroli, eds., Il neogotico in Europa nei secoli XIX e XX, Pavia, 25-28 settembre 1985. Milan: Mazzotta, 1989.
- Teresa Ferreira, "Scambi culturali tra l’Italia e il Portogallo. Attività di Alfredo D’Andrade e Sebastiano Locati in Portogallo," in Gaia Piccarolo and Giuliana Ricci, Luigi Manini (1848-1936) architetto e scenografo pittore e fotografo. Cinisello Balsamo: Silvana, 2007. pp. 65–71.
- Sebastiano Locati, Progetti Costruzioni Rilievi.Pavia: Coi tipi dello stabilimento tipografico Luigi Rossetti, 1936.
- Alessandra Mazzarella, "Sebastiano Giuseppe Locati. Orientamenti concettuali del restauro agli esordi della scuola Superiore di architettura," in Vittorio Fianchetti Pardo, ed. La Facoltà di Architettura dell'Università La Sapienza dalle origini al Duemila: discipline, docenti, studenti. Rome: Gangemi, 2001. pp. 143–168.
- Elisabetta Polezzo. "GIUSEPPE SEBASTIANO LOCATI - Un architetto tra eclettismo e liberty." Academia.edu. Retrieved 2 July 2016.
- Simona Sala, Serena Sansone, "L’Acquario di Milano e l’architetto Giuseppe Sebastiano Locati, Tesi di laurea" in Storia dell’architettura, Politecnico di Milano, a.a. 1997-98, relatore Professora Aurora Scotti.
