= Prabhakar Balwant Dani =

Member of the Rashtriya Swayamsevak Sangh (1908–1965)

Prabhakar Balwant Dani (c. 1908 – c. 1965) was a member of the Rashtriya Swayamsevak Sangh (RSS), a right-wing Hindutva paramilitary organisation. He served as a pracharak (propagator), involved in spreading the ideology of the RSS through personal contact, meetings, and public lectures) of the organization. He served in senior positions of the RSS and played a large role in spreading the RSS network in the erstwhile Indian state of Madhya Bharat.

== Life ==
Dani was born in 1908 in Umred in the Nagpur district in the Bombay State, and was the son of a rich landlord. He joined the RSS as a swayamsevak in 1925, shortly after its formation, and he was among the first pracharaks (propagators) to be initiated by the RSS founder K. B. Hedgewar.

Dani served as the General Secretary of the RSS for more than a decade, especially during the crucial periods of Indian independence and the 1948 ban of the RSS. He died in 1965 while serving as the General Secretary.

== Activism ==
Hedgewar sent Dani as a pracharak to the Benaras Hindu University in the early 1930s, a move that had the approval of Madan Mohan Malviya, the university's founder and a leader of the Hindu Mahasabha. Hedgewar advised Dani to freely intermix with the students and learn the native languages of the regions that they came from, so that students from all regions could be recruited into the RSS. Among the people recruited by Dani was a young Lecturer named M. S. Golwalkar, who would later become the Chief of the RSS.

Later Dani worked as a prant pracharak (regional propagator) for Madhya Bharat during 1940–46. He worked from a headquarters in Indore. His first team of pracharaks were recruited during an Officers Training Camp held in Khandwa in 1942. They included Manohar Rao Moghe, who went to Ujjain, Kushabhau Thakre and Haribhau Wakankar, who went to Mandsaur-Ratlam division and Kukshi respectively, and Moreshwar Rao Gadre, who worked in Indore. These pracharaks developed the initial RSS network in towns as well as villages. By 1946, Dani's team had recruited 3% of the urban population and 1% of the rural population of Madhya Bharat into the RSS, as per Hedgewar's target. In Ujjain area, there were around sixty shakhas (branches) by 1950. In Indore area, there were a hundred.

When the RSS was banned in 1948, following the Mahatma Gandhi assassination, and Golwalkar put in prison, the RSS held satyagrahas to protest against the ban. Of the 1,995 swayamsevaks that were arrested for the satyagraha, 498 were from the Ujjain district, 488 from the Indore district and 209 from Shajapur district. The strong foundation laid by Dani and his team in central India later led to the rise of the Jana Sangh from this area.

Dani was appointed as the General Secretary (sarkaryavaha) of the RSS in 1946, a position in which he served till 1956 and again from 1962 to 1965. Following the ban and the arrests, he negotiated with Sardar Patel for the lifting of the ban, along with colleagues Eknath Ranade and Balasaheb Deoras. The three of them wrote a constitution for the RSS to the satisfaction of Patel, which was a pre-condition for lifting the ban. In practice, the democratic measures put into the constitution never had any effect because the exact number of candidates were nominated for all posts without the need for any elections.

== Bibliography ==
- Jaffrelot, Christophe (2011). Religion, Caste, and Politics in India. C Hurst & Co. ISBN 978-1849041386.
- Jaffrelot, Christophe (1996). The Hindu Nationalist Movement and Indian Politics. C. Hurst & Co. Publishers. ISBN 978-1850653011.
