= Shashikala Dani =

Indian classical Jaltarang musician

Vidushi Shashikala Dani
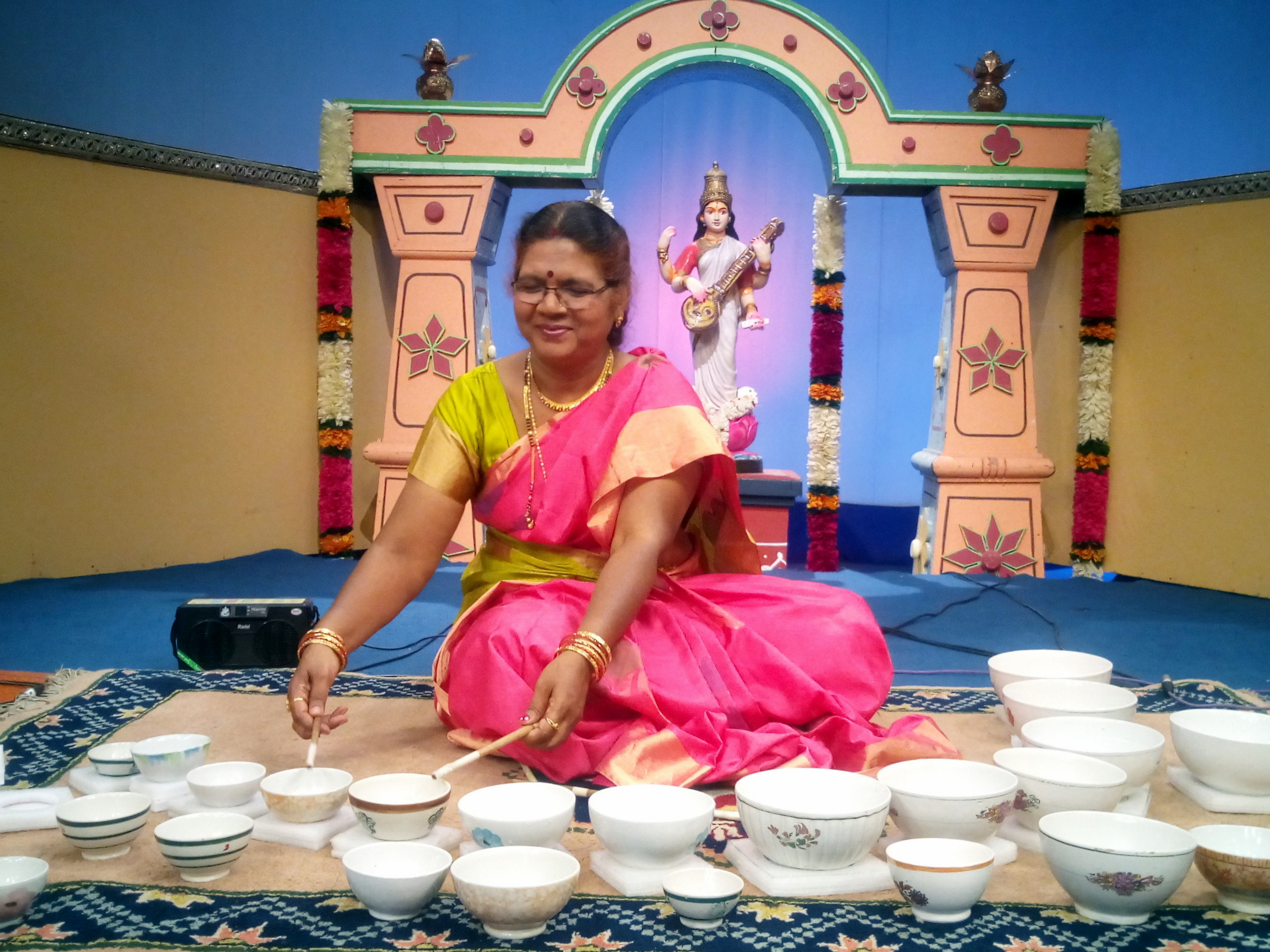
- Shashikala presenting a Jaltarang music concert

Background information
- Born: 11 November 1959 (age 66); Kalaghatagi, Karnataka, India
- Genres: Hindustani classical music, Indian classical music
- Occupations: Jaltarang Musician, State Bank of Mysore
- Instruments: Jaltarang, harmonium, sitar, violin, dilruba, tabla

Vidushi Shashikala Dani (Kannada: ವಿದೂಷಿ ಶಶಿಕಲಾ ದಾನಿ, Hindi: विदूषी शशिकला दानी) is an Indian Hindustani classical Jal Tarang artist. She is one among the few musicians and presently the only All India Radio-graded female exponent of the Jal Tarang. She is a multi-instrument artist with concert and teaching experience in Jal Tarang, Harmonium, Sitar, Violin, Dilruba and Tabla. She is also an All India Radio-graded vocalist in the Gamaka genre of Hindustani Light Music.

== Biography ==
Shashikala earned a Bachelor of Arts and lives in Hubli, where she married Shri Arun Dani, son of journalist T.S.R. Awardee Lt. Shri Surendra Dani. They have a son, musician Sugnan Dani. After working at the State Bank of Mysore for 33 years, she is now a Jal Tarang artist.

== Musical career ==
Learning Jal Tarang, she decided to develop her classical music career with a focus on this instrument.

After learning the Jal Tarang, she has imbibed both "Gayaki and Tantrakari Angs" in her playing style. She is trained in the Gwalior Gharana School of Hindustani Classical Music under her father and Guru Pt. D. R. Warang. She has also developed multiple other styles of playing. Her focus is "Layakari".

She is presently involved in mentoring young artists at her institute, Swara Naada Sangeeta Vidyalaya®.

== Awards and recognitions ==
- "A Grade" in Jal tarang by Prasar Bharti – All India Radio
- "Gāyana Gangā" Life-Achievement Award by Padma-Vibhushan Dr.Gangubai Hangal – 2009
- "Karnataka Kalashri" Award by Government Of Karnataka
- "Kitturu Rani Chennamma" Award by Government Of Karnataka
- "B Grade" in Gamaka (Hindustani Light Music) by Prasar Bharti – All India Radio
- First at National-Level Inter-Bank Music Competition held in Chennai – 1991
- Selected twice for scholarship by Karnataka Sangeeta Nritya Academy – 1982, 1985
