= S. G. Dani =

Indian mathematician

Shrikrishna Gopalrao Dani
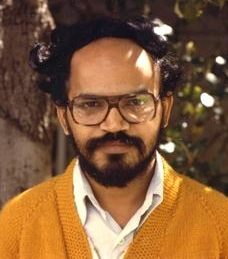
- Dani at Berkeley, California (1982)
- Born: Belgaum, India
- Citizenship: Indian
- Education: University of Mumbai; TIFR
- Awards: Shanti Swaroop Bhatnagar Award; TWAS Prize
- Scientific career
- Fields: Lie group, Ergodic theory
- Workplaces: Mumbai
- Doctoral advisor: M. S. Raghunathan

Shrikrishna Gopalrao Dani is a professor of mathematics at the Centre for Excellence in Basic Sciences, Mumbai who works in the broad area of ergodic theory.

== Education ==
He did a master's degree from the University of Mumbai in 1969. He then joined the Tata Institute of Fundamental Research (TIFR), Mumbai for a PhD which he was awarded in 1975. After that, he joined TIFR as a faculty member. After TIFR, he was the Chair Professor at the Indian Institute of Technology, Bombay. He was a visiting scholar at the Institute for Advanced Study during 1976–77 and 1983–84.

== Administration ==
He has been a member of the NBHM since 1996 and was the Chairman of the NBHM. He is also the chairman, Commission for Development and Exchange (CDE) of International Mathematical Union, for the period 2007–2010. He has served as Editor of Proceedings (Math. Sci.) of the Indian Academy of Sciences, Bangalore for many years since 1987.

== Awards and recognition ==
Dani was awarded the Shanti Swarup Bhatnagar Prize in 1990. He gave an invited talk at the International Congress of Mathematicians held in Zurich, Switzerland in 1994. He received the World Academy of Sciences prize in 2007.

== See also ==
- List of Indian mathematicians
