= Amit Dani =

Indian cricketer (born 1973)

Personal information
- Full name: Amit Pramod Dani
- Born: 30 June 1973; Bombay, India
- Batting: Right-handed
- Bowling: Right-arm medium
- Source: ESPNcricinfo, 24 November 2016

Amit Dani (born 30 June 1973) is an Indian first-class cricketer who played for Mumbai. He made his first-class debut for Mumbai in the 1995–96 Ranji Trophy on 13 December 1995.
