= Dany Locati =

Italian skeleton racer

Dany Locati (born 3 January 1977) is an Italian skeleton racer who competed from 1994 to 2006. She finished ninth in the women's skeleton event at the 2002 Winter Olympics in Salt Lake City.

Locati's best finish at the FIBT World Championships was eighth in the women's skeleton event at Königssee in 2004. She retired after the 2006 Winter Olympics in Turin after not qualifying for them.
