= Rajesh Dani =

Indian cricketer (born 1961)

Personal information
- Born: 19 November 1961 (age 64); Calcutta, India
- Source: Cricinfo, 27 March 2016

Rajesh Dani (born 19 November 1961) is an Indian former cricketer. He played eleven first-class matches for Bengal between 1979 and 1987.

== See also ==
- List of Bengal cricketers
