= Puerto Rico Highway 155 =

Highway in Puerto Rico

Highway 155
- Ruta 155

Route information
- Maintained by Puerto Rico DTPW
- Length: 69.0 km (42.9 mi)
- Existed: 1953–present

Major junctions
- South end: PR-14 in Coamo barrio-pueblo
- PR-138 in Pasto; PR-143 in Hayales–Bauta Arriba–Bermejales; PR-5155 in Orocovis–Orocovis barrio-pueblo; PR-157 in Orocovis; PR-137 in Morovis Sud; PR-159 / PR-6623 in Morovis barrio-pueblo; PR-137 in Morovis Norte; PR-145 / PR-634 in Morovis Norte–Torrecillas–Fránquez; PR-137 in Fránquez–Barahona; PR-670 in Algarrobo–Pugnado Afuera
- North end: PR-2 / PR-688 in Cabo Caribe

Location
- Country: United States
- Territory: Puerto Rico
- Municipalities: Coamo, Orocovis, Morovis, Vega Baja

Highway system
- Roads in Puerto Rico; List
← PR-154	→ PR-156
← PR-5144	PR-5155	→ PR-5156

Puerto Rico Highway 155 (PR-155) is a rural road that goes from Coamo, Puerto Rico to Vega Baja through Orocovis and Morovis. It extends from PR-14 in downtown Coamo to PR-2 east of downtown Vega Baja.

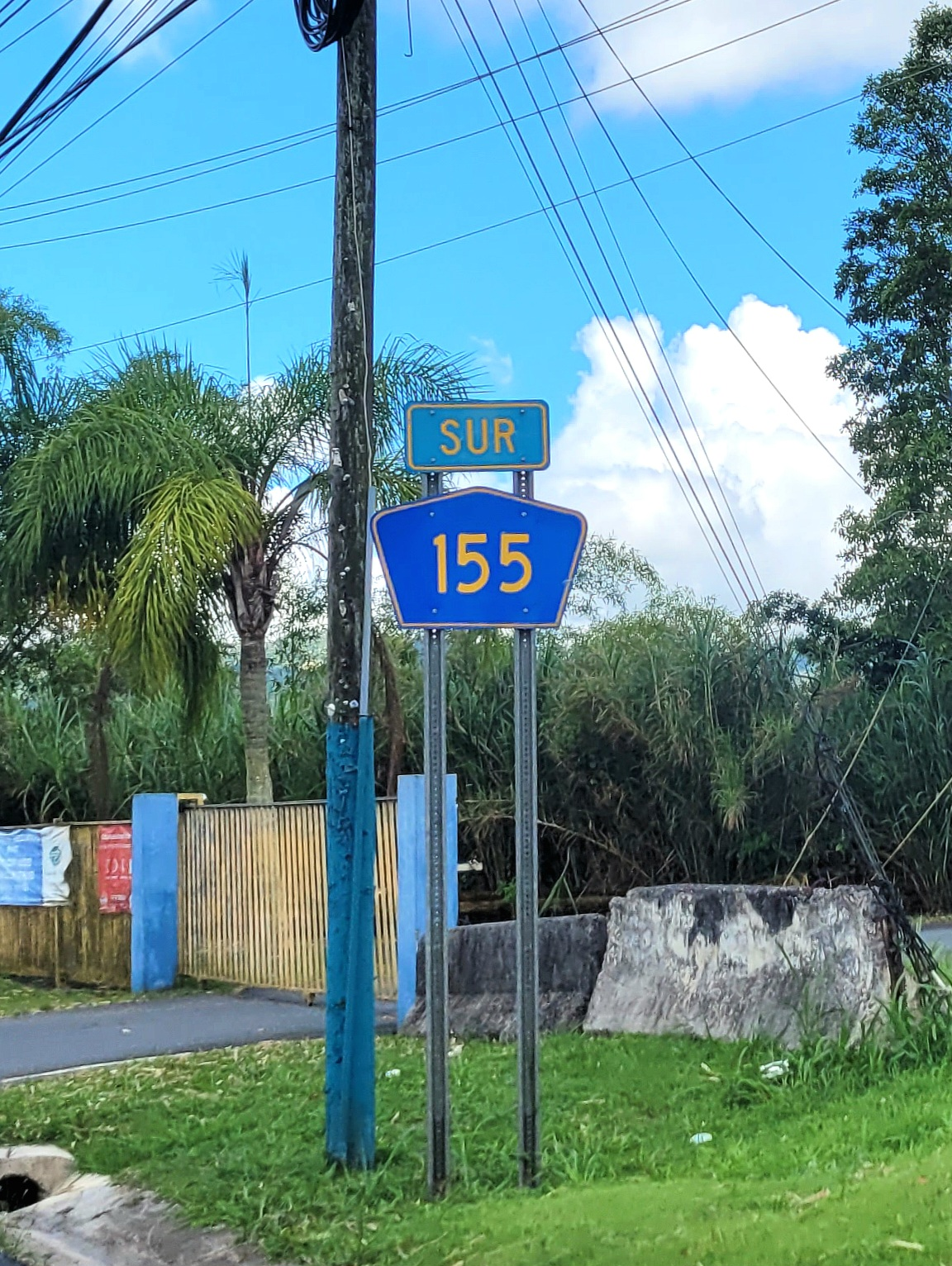
Puerto Rico Highway 155 south in Orocovis

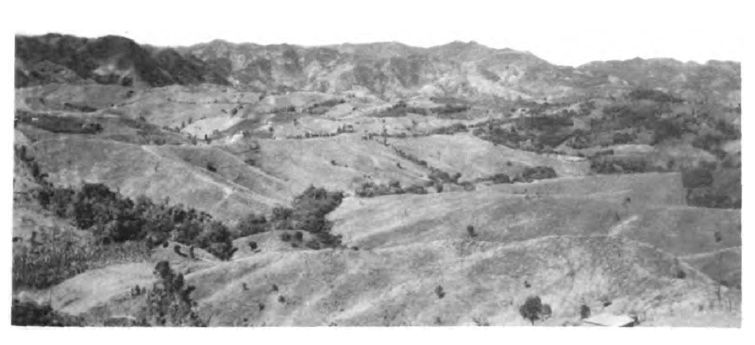
Damián Arriba Fault (from PR-155 looking southwest)

== Major intersections ==
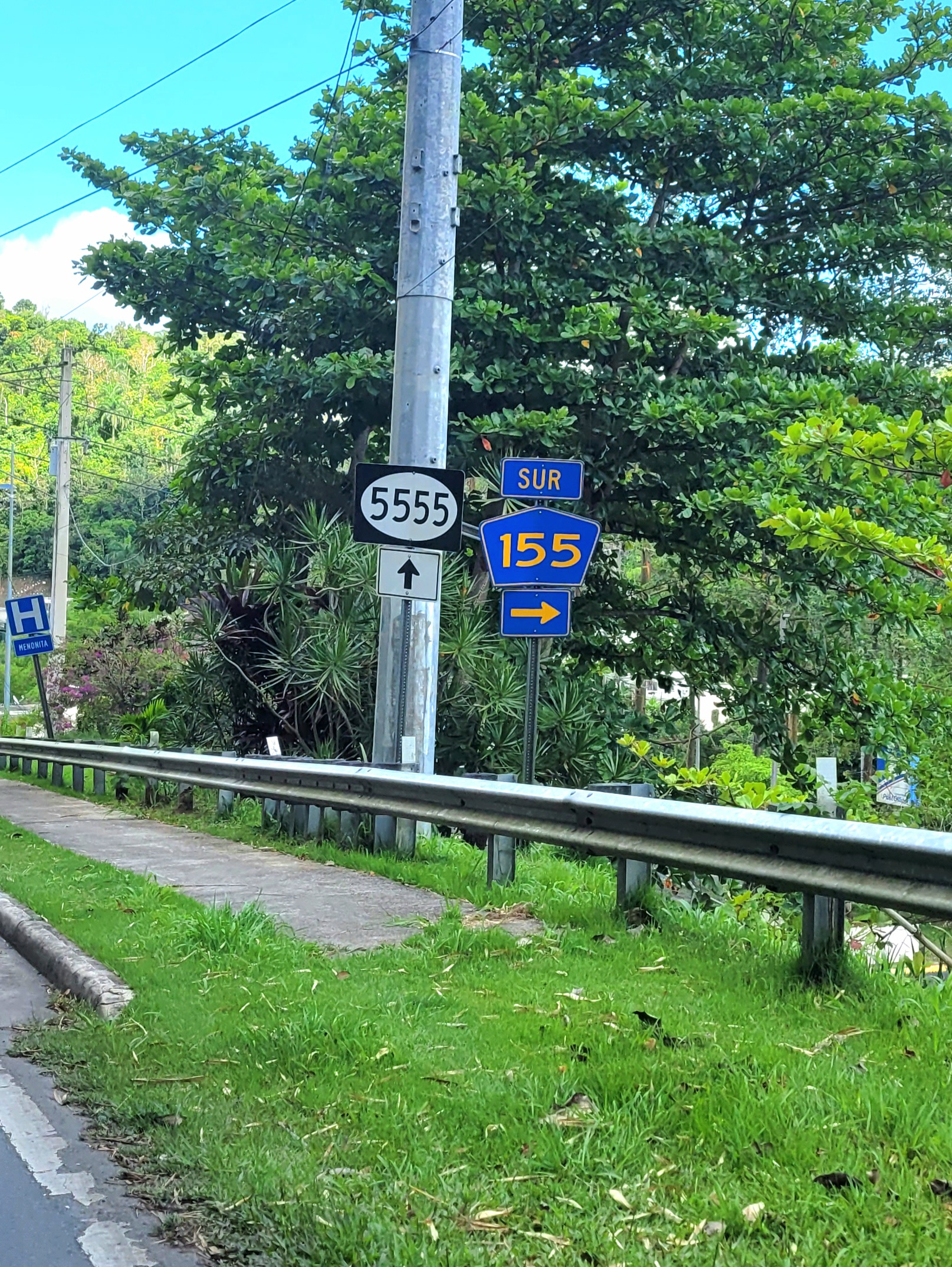
PR-155 south at its junction with PR-5555 east in Orocovis

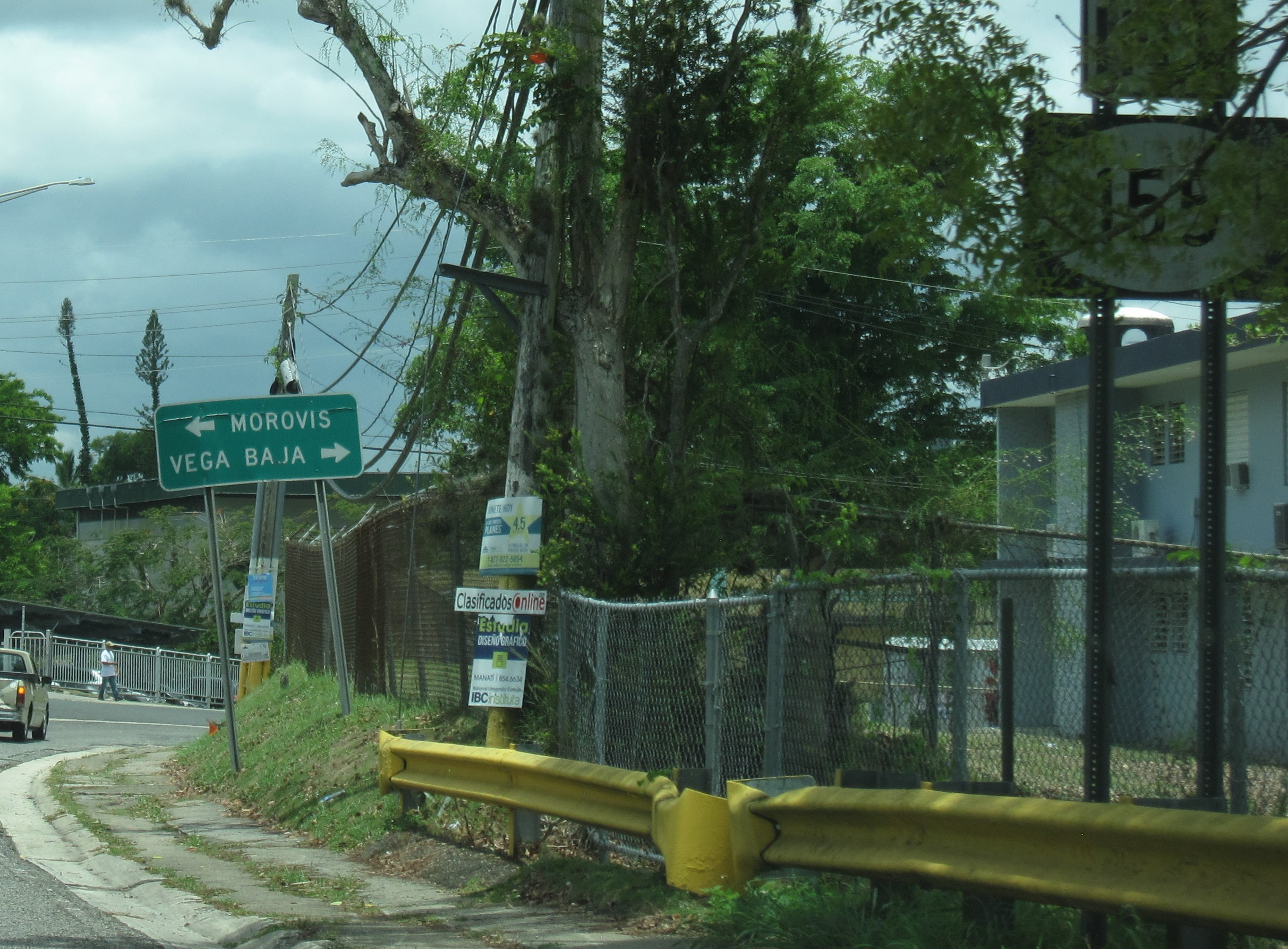
Puerto Rico Highway 155 in Morovis

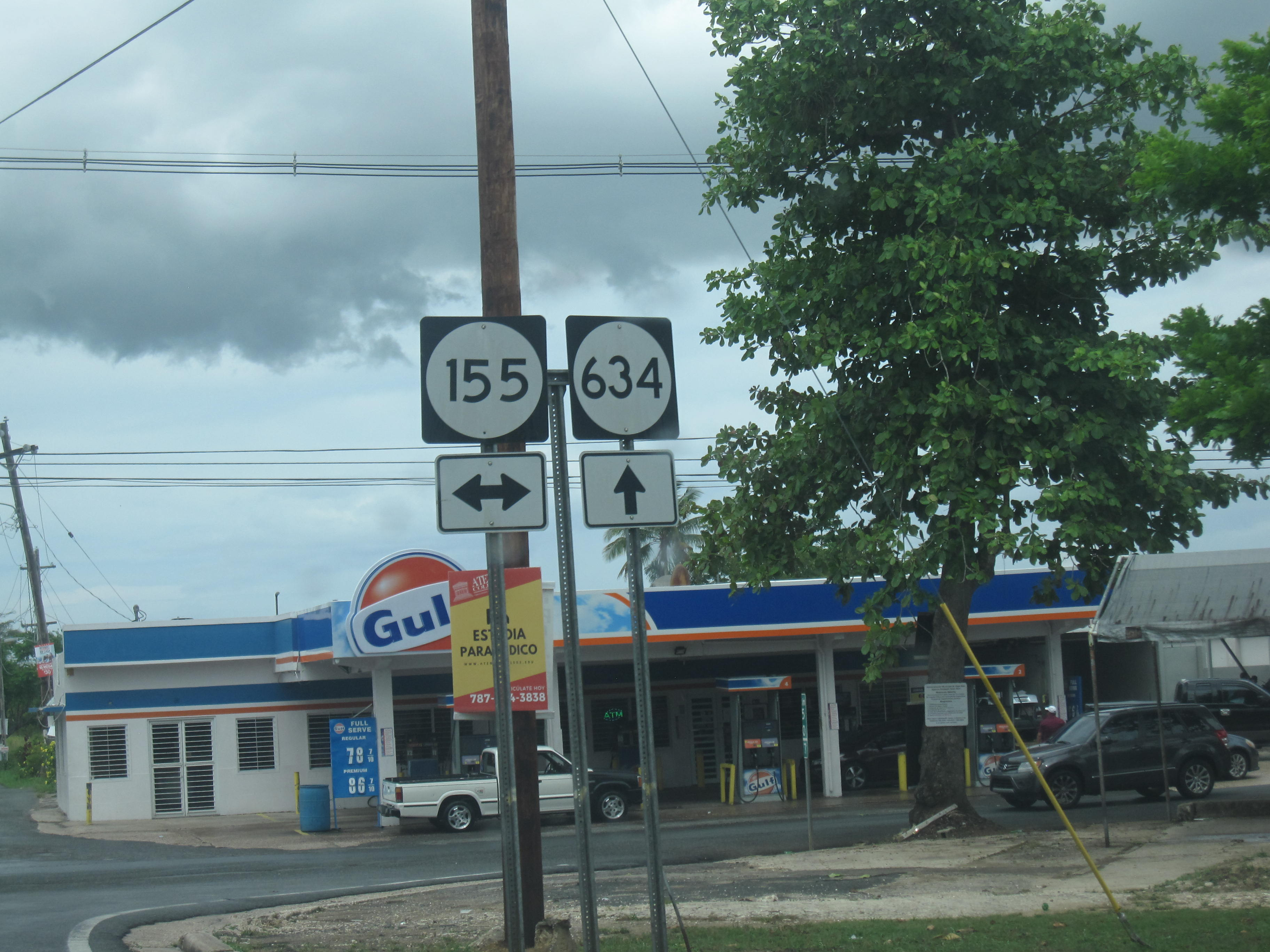
PR-155 and PR-634 signs in Morovis

Municipality	Location	km	mi	Destinations	Notes
Coamo	Coamo barrio-pueblo	0.0	0.0	PR-14 (Calle José Ignacio Quintón) – Juana Díaz, Aibonito	Southern terminus of PR-155; one-way street; eastbound access via Calle Florencio Santiago
Coamo	Pasto	2.3	1.4	PR-138 south (Avenida Luis Muñoz Marín) – Santa Isabel	
Coamo	Pasto	4.6	2.9	PR-555 – Coamo Arriba	
Coamo	Pasto	5.8	3.6	PR-554 – Santa Catalina	
Coamo–Orocovis municipal line	Hayales–Bauta Arriba– Bermejales tripoint	16.1	10.0	PR-143 (Ruta Panorámica) – Barranquitas, Adjuntas	
Orocovis	Saltos	22.1	13.7	PR-566 – Saltos	
Orocovis	Orocovis–Orocovis barrio-pueblo line	27.4	17.0	PR-5156 (Avenida Jesús M. "Tito" Colón Collazo) – Barranquitas	
Orocovis	Orocovis–Orocovis barrio-pueblo line	27.5	17.1	PR-5155 north (Calle 4 de Julio) – Orocovis	
Orocovis	Orocovis	28.2	17.5	PR-597 (Calle Ernesto Ramos Antonini) – Orocovis	
Orocovis	Orocovis	28.6	17.8	PR-5555 east (Desvío Juan Enrique "Quique" López Torres) – Orocovis, Corozal	
Orocovis	Orocovis	30.3	18.8	PR-157 west – Ciales, Jayuya	
Morovis	Río Grande–Morovis Sud line	44.0	27.3	PR-617 / PR-618 – Morovis Sud, Cuchillas	
Morovis	Morovis Sud	46.2	28.7	PR-137 (Expreso Ángel "Tony" Laureano Martínez) – Vega Baja, Corozal	
Morovis	Monte Llano	46.6	29.0	PR-6623 – Morovis	
Morovis	Morovis barrio-pueblo	47.1	29.3	PR-159 (Avenida Corozal) / PR-6623 (Calle Principal) – Morovis, Corozal	One-way streets
Morovis	Morovis Norte	47.5	29.5	PR-137 north (Expreso Ángel "Tony" Laureano Martínez) – Corozal, Patrón	
Morovis	Morovis Norte	48.2	30.0	PR-6634 – Morovis Norte	
Morovis	Morovis Norte	50.5	31.4	PR-137 (Expreso Ángel "Tony" Laureano Martínez) – Morovis, Vega Baja	
Morovis	Morovis Norte–Torrecillas– Fránquez tripoint	50.7	31.5	PR-145 west / PR-634 – Ciales, Fránquez	
Morovis	Barahona	53.8	33.4	PR-633 – Manatí	
Morovis	Fránquez	55.3 8.7 (Note: Kilometer markers represent the distance along PR-137 rather than PR-155.)	34.4 5.4	PR-137 south (Expreso Ángel "Tony" Laureano Martínez) – Morovis	Southern terminus of PR-137 concurrency
Morovis	Barahona	8.5 55.4	5.3 34.4	PR-137 north (Expreso Ángel "Tony" Laureano Martínez) – Vega Baja	Northern terminus of PR-137 concurrency
Morovis	Barahona–Fránquez line	55.5	34.5	PR-634 – Fránquez	
Vega Baja	Pugnado Adentro	57.5	35.7	PR-643 – Pugnado Adentro	
Vega Baja	Quebrada Arenas	58.7	36.5	PR-645 to PR-646 – Quebrada Arenas, Río Arriba	
Vega Baja	Pugnado Afuera	60.5	37.6	PR-673 – Pugnado Afuera	
Vega Baja	Pugnado Afuera	61.8	38.4	PR-644 – Pugnado Afuera	
Vega Baja	Algarrobo–Pugnado Afuera line	64.8	40.3	PR-670 – Manatí	
Vega Baja	Algarrobo	66.0	41.0	PR-671 – Algarobo	
Vega Baja	Algarrobo	66.8	41.5	PR-6671 – Puerto Nuevo	
Vega Baja	Cabo Caribe–Río Abajo line	68.3	42.4	PR-674 – Río Abajo	
Vega Baja	Cabo Caribe	69.0	42.9	PR-2 – Vega Alta, Manatí	Northern terminus of PR-155 and western terminus of PR-688
Vega Baja	Cabo Caribe	69.0	42.9	PR-688	Continuation beyond PR-2
1.000 mi = 1.609 km; 1.000 km = 0.621 mi: Concurrency terminus; Incomplete access

== Related route ==
Highway 5155
- Location: Orocovis
- Length: 1.3 km (0.81 mi)

Puerto Rico Highway 5155 (PR-5155) is a north–south road that connects PR-155 with downtown Orocovis. This highways extends from PR-155 south near PR-5156 until its end at PR-5555 near PR-155 north. The entire route is located in Orocovis.

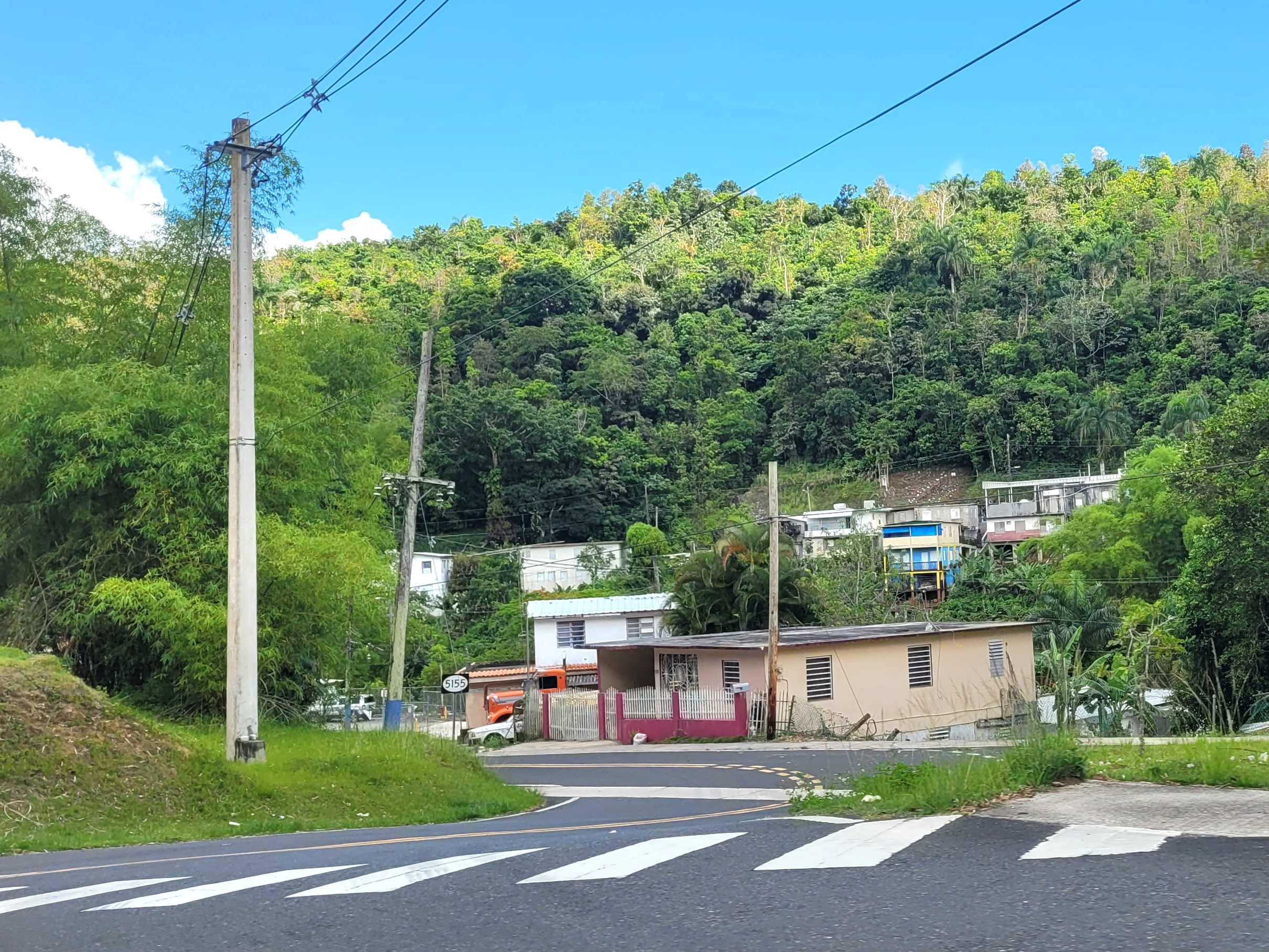
PR-5155 south at its junction with PR-5555 in Orocovis barrio

Location	km	mi	Destinations	Notes
Orocovis–Orocovis barrio-pueblo line	0.0	0.0	PR-155 (Avenida Luis Muñoz Marín) – Morovis, Coamo	Southern terminus of PR-5155
Orocovis barrio-pueblo	0.2– 0.3	0.12– 0.19	PR-599 (Calle Juan Rivera de Santiago) – Orocovis	
Orocovis barrio-pueblo–Orocovis line	0.6	0.37	PR-156 (Calle Pedro Arroyo) / PR-597 (Calle Ernesto Ramos Antonini) – Orocovis	One-way street; PR-156 east access (to Barranquitas) is via Calle Luis Muñoz Rivera
Orocovis barrio-pueblo–Orocovis line	0.7– 0.8	0.43– 0.50	PR-568 – Corozal	
Orocovis	1.3	0.81	PR-5555 (Desvío Juan Enrique "Quique" López Torres) – Morovis, Corozal	Northern terminus of PR-5155
1.000 mi = 1.609 km; 1.000 km = 0.621 mi: Incomplete access

== See also ==
- 1953 Puerto Rico highway renumbering
