= Puerto Rico Highway 137 =

Highway in Puerto Rico

Highway 137
- Ruta 137
- Expreso Ángel A. "Tony" Laureano Martínez

Route information
- Maintained by Puerto Rico DTPW
- Length: 17.9 km (11.1 mi)

Major junctions
- South end: PR-155 in Morovis Norte
- PR-159 in Monte Llano; PR-155 in Morovis Sud; PR-617 in Morovis Sud–Morovis Norte; PR-155 in Morovis Norte; PR-634 in Fránquez; PR-155 in Fránquez–Barahona; PR-643 in Pugnado Adentro; PR-644 in Pugnado Afuera; PR-670 in Pugnado Afuera–Algarrobo; PR-22 in Algarrobo
- North end: PR-2 in Algarrobo

Location
- Country: United States
- Territory: Puerto Rico
- Municipalities: Morovis, Vega Baja

Highway system
- Roads in Puerto Rico; List
← PR-136	→ PR-138

Puerto Rico Highway 137 (PR-137) is a north–south road that travels from Vega Baja to Morovis. This highway extends from PR-2 in Vega Baja to PR-155 near downtown Morovis and it is known as Expreso Ángel A. "Tony" Laureano Martínez.

== Route description ==
With a length of about 17.9 kilometers (11.1 mi), PR-137 begins at PR-2 junction in Algarrobo, with two lanes per direction. Then, it crosses PR-22 and PR-670, where the road narrows to a single lane per direction. In Pugnado Afuera, the highway meets PR-644, and intersects with PR-643 in Pugnado Adentro. In Morovis, the road intersects with PR-155 between Barahona, Fránquez, Morovis Norte and Morovis Sud barrios. Also, the highway has junctions with PR-634, PR-617, PR-159, PR-6617 and PR-6619 before ending at PR-155. Between Vega Baja and Morovis, the road has segments as 2+1 road, with two lanes in both directions at some intersections.

Puerto Rico Highway 137 by municipality

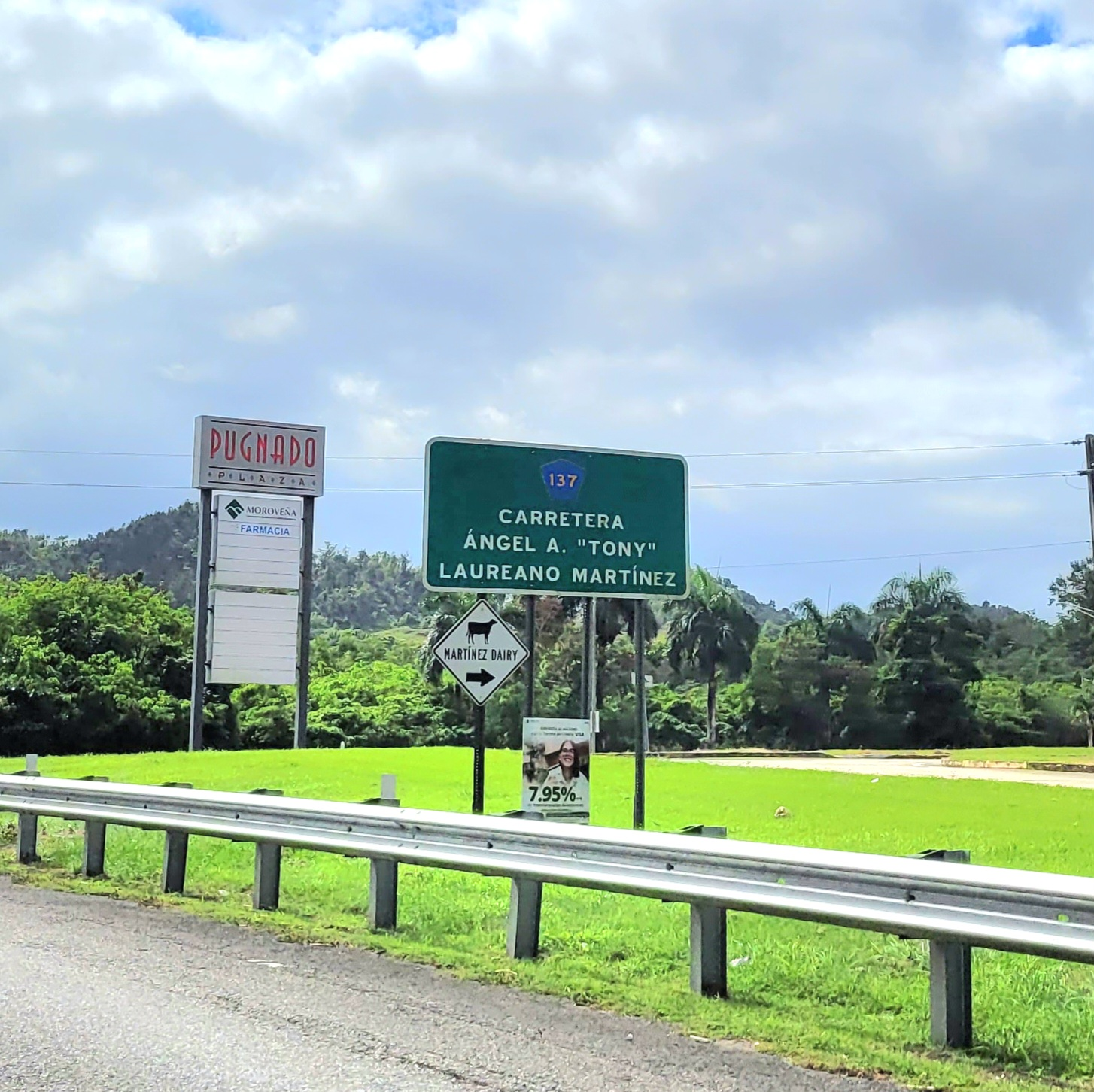
Southbound sign in Vega Baja

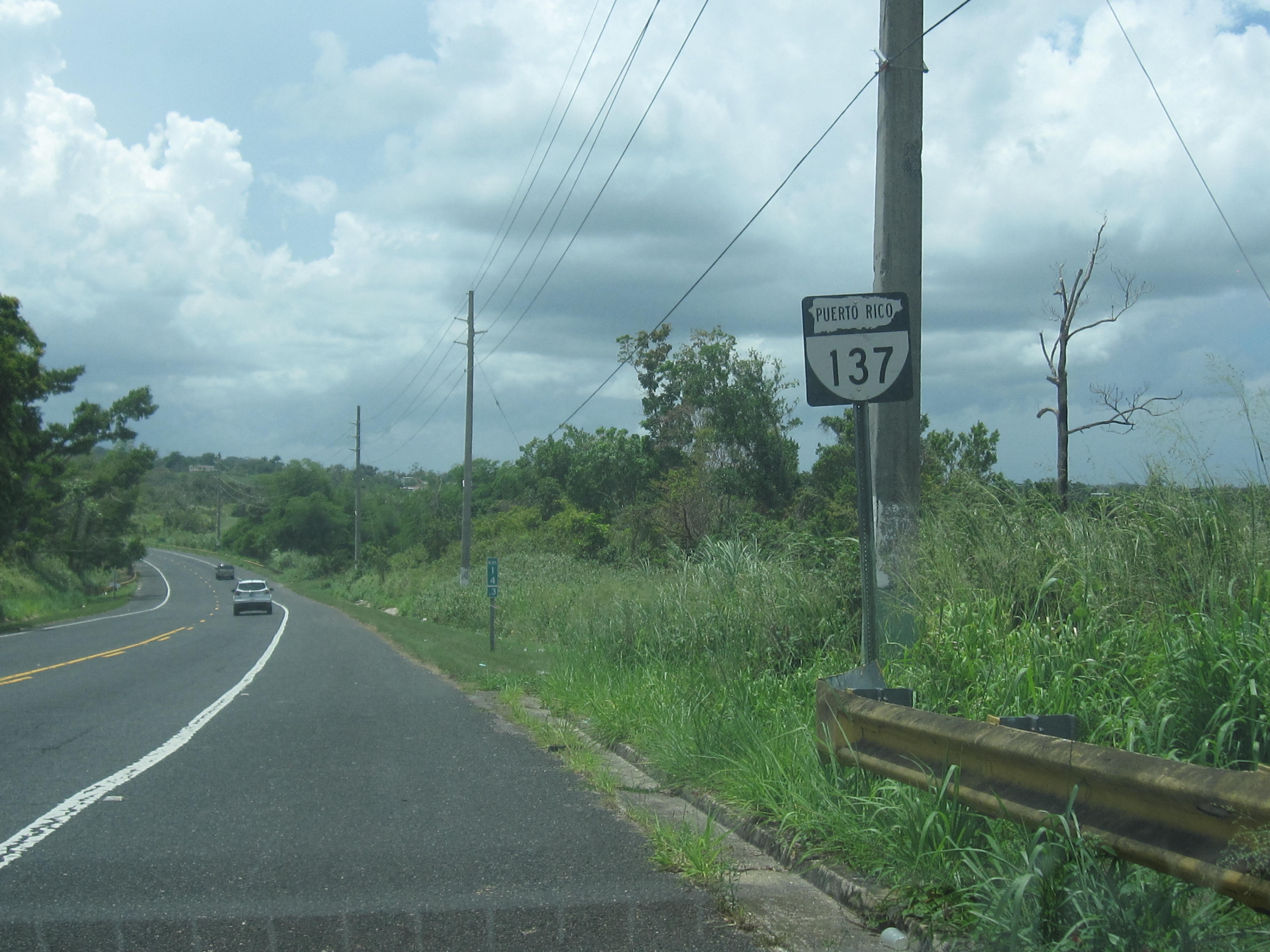
Northbound shield in Morovis with the shape of the island of Puerto Rico

=== Locations served ===
The following are the municipalities, barrios and landmarks through which PR-137 passes from north to south:

Municipality	Barrios	Landmarks
Vega Baja	Algarrobo, Pugnado Afuera, Pugnado Adentro	
Morovis	Barahona, Fránquez, Morovis Norte (2 times), Morovis Sud, Monte Llano	Morovis National Cemetery, Morovis Municipal Cemetery, Morovis Plaza Shopping Center

=== Morovis National Cemetery ===
Morovis National Cemetery for veterans was established in Morovis in 2020, at a 247.5-acre parcel of land that can be accessed from Highway 137 at km 11.2. It was built to take over the functions of the existing Puerto Rico National Cemetery located in Bayamón.

== Major intersections ==
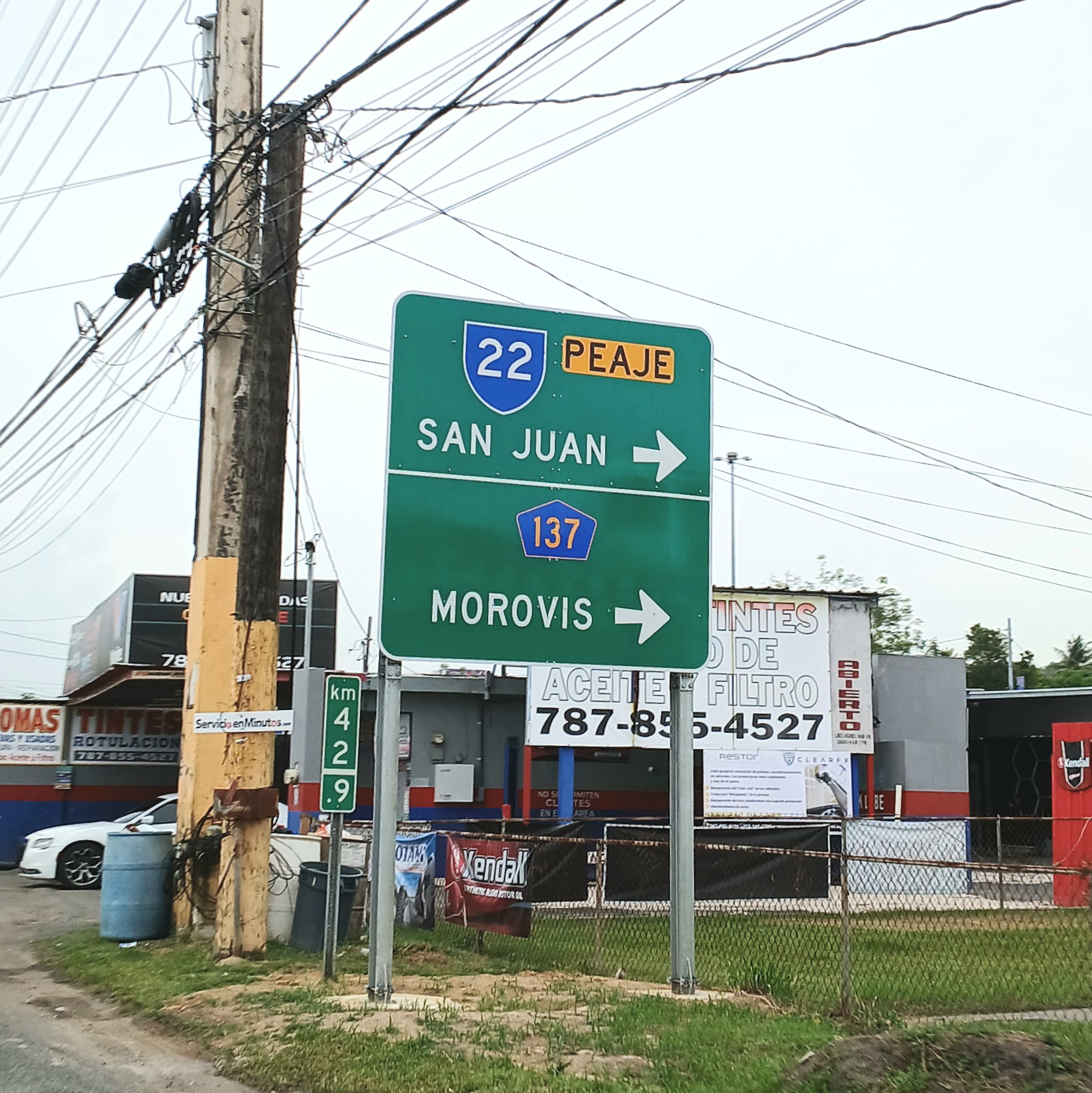
PR-2 east at PR-22 and PR-137 intersection in Algarrobo, Vega Baja

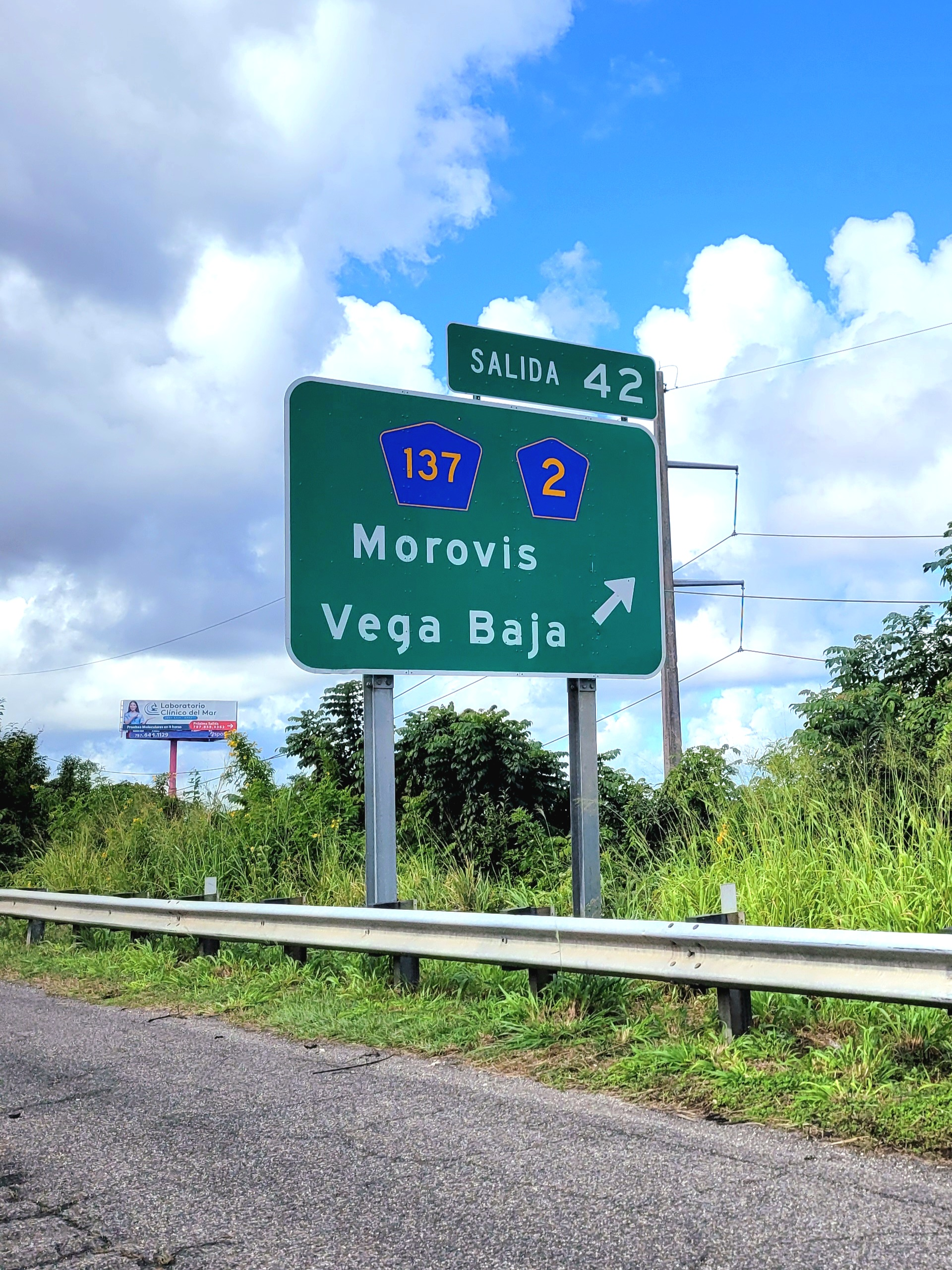
PR-22 west at exit 42 to PR-2 and PR-137 in Algarrobo, Vega Baja

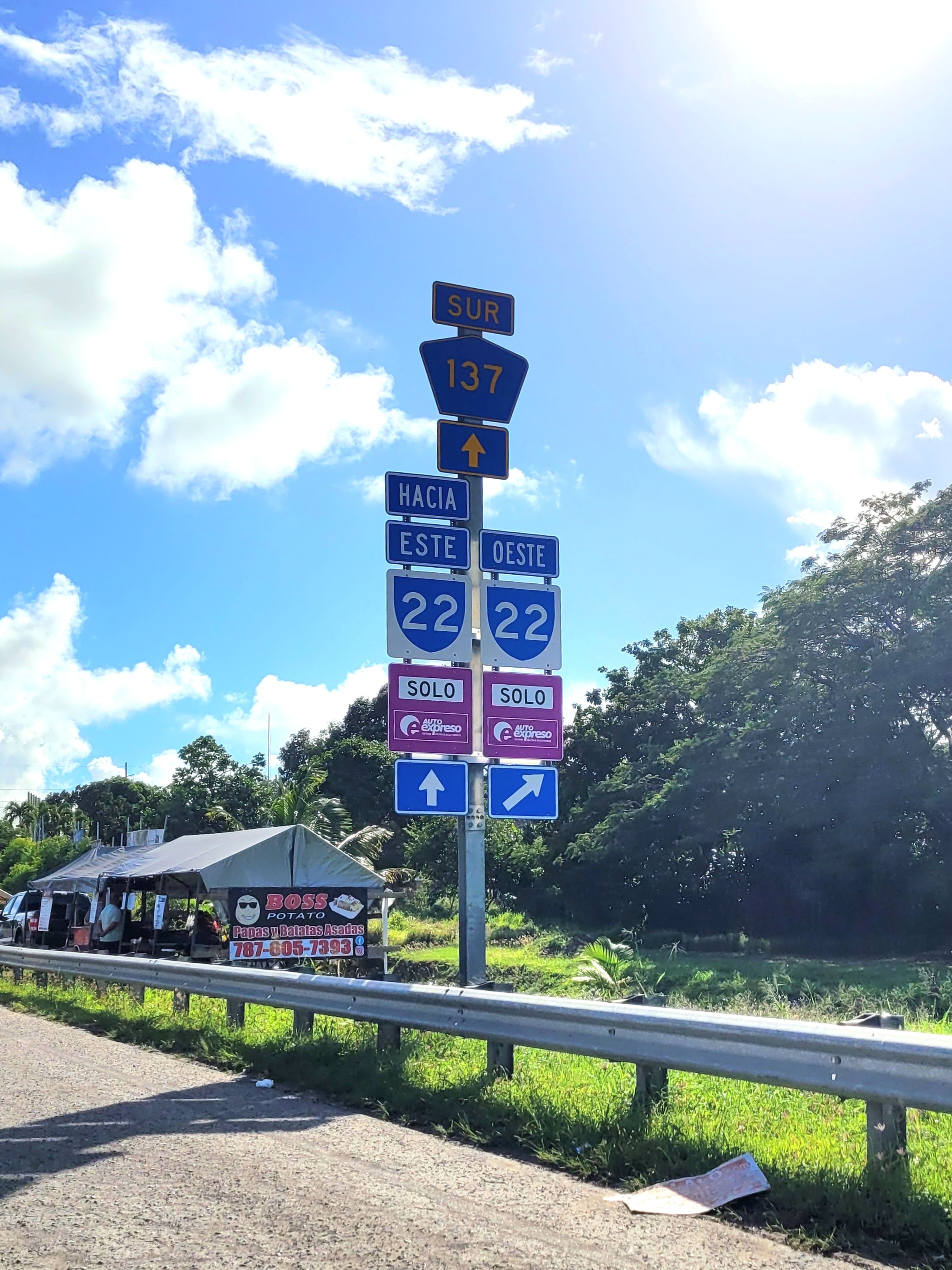
PR-137 south at PR-22 interchange in Algarrobo, Vega Baja

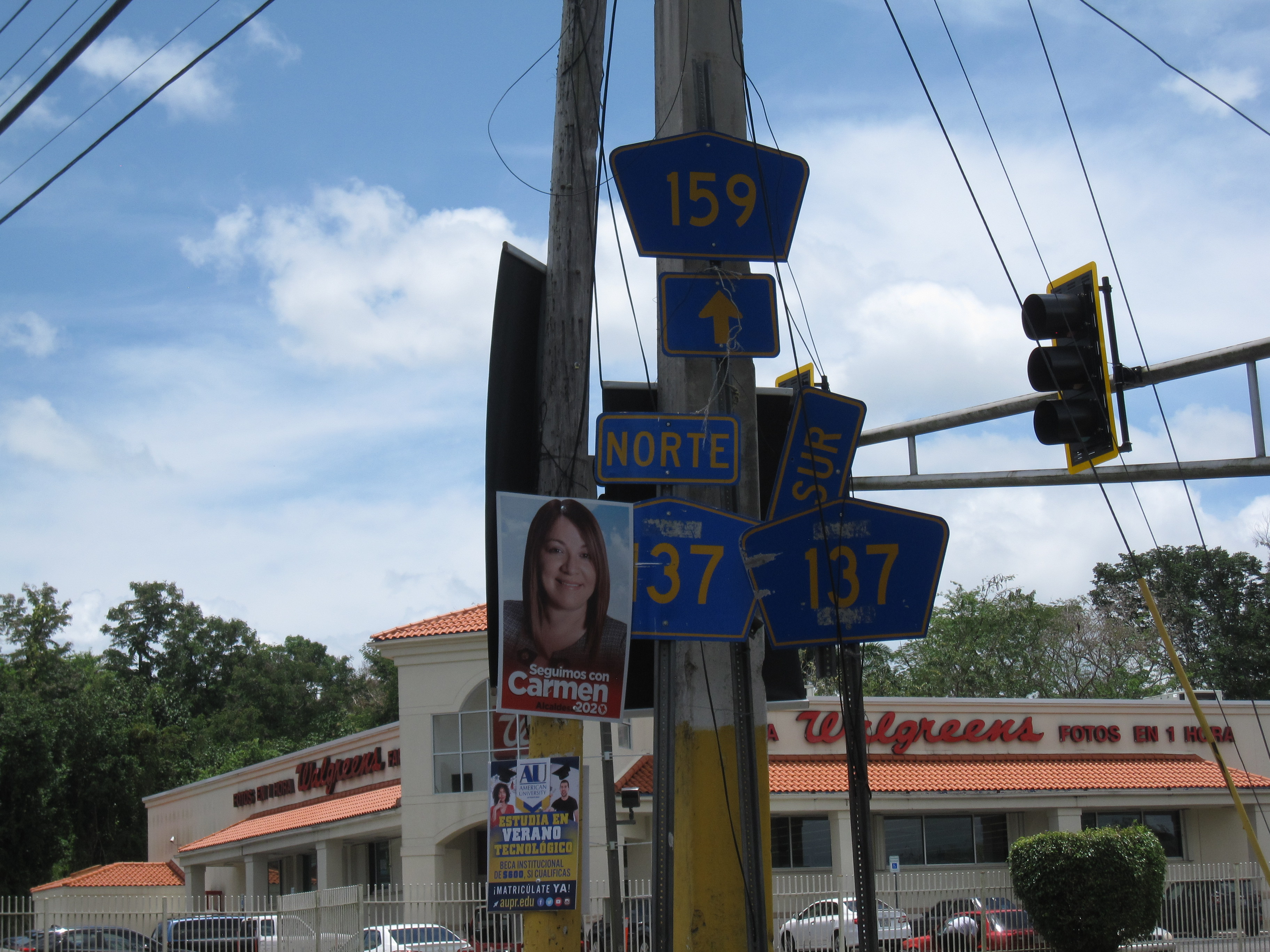
PR-159 east at PR-137 junction in Monte Llano, Morovis

Municipality	Location	km	mi	Destinations	Notes
Morovis	Morovis Norte	17.9	11.1	PR-155 – Morovis, Vega Baja	Southern terminus of PR-137
Morovis	Monte Llano	17.7	11.0	PR-6619 – Morovis	
Morovis	Monte Llano	17.4	10.8	PR-6617 – Patrón	
Morovis	Monte Llano	17.1	10.6	PR-159 (Avenida Corozal) – Morovis, Corozal	
Morovis	Morovis Sud	15.9	9.9	PR-155 – Morovis, Orocovis	
Morovis	Morovis Sud–Morovis Norte line	15.2	9.4	PR-617 – Morovis	
Morovis	Morovis Norte	12.6	7.8	PR-155 – Morovis, Vega Baja, Ciales	
Morovis	Fránquez	12.0	7.5	PR-634 – Torrecillas, Fránquez	
Morovis	Fránquez	9.3	5.8	To PR-155 / PR-634 / PR-6644 / PR-Calle Girasol – Fránquez	
Morovis	Fránquez	8.7	5.4	PR-155 – Morovis	Southern terminus of PR-155 concurrency
Morovis	Barahona	8.5	5.3	PR-155 – Vega Baja	Northern terminus of PR-155 concurrency
Vega Baja	Pugnado Adentro	6.6	4.1	PR-643 – Pugnado Adentro	
Vega Baja	Pugnado Afuera	3.1	1.9	PR-644 – Pugnado Afuera	
Vega Baja	Pugnado Afuera–Algarrobo line	1.3– 1.2	0.81– 0.75	PR-670 – Vega Baja, Manatí	
Vega Baja	Algarrobo	0.7– 0.2	0.43– 0.12	PR-22 (Autopista José de Diego) – Manatí, Arecibo, Mayagüez, Bayamón, San Juan	PR-22 exits 42, 42A and 42B; partial cloverleaf interchange
Vega Baja	Algarrobo	0.0	0.0	PR-2 – Vega Baja, Manatí	Northern terminus of PR-137
1.000 mi = 1.609 km; 1.000 km = 0.621 mi: Concurrency terminus
