= Morovis National Cemetery =

US National Cemetery in Morovis, Puerto Rico

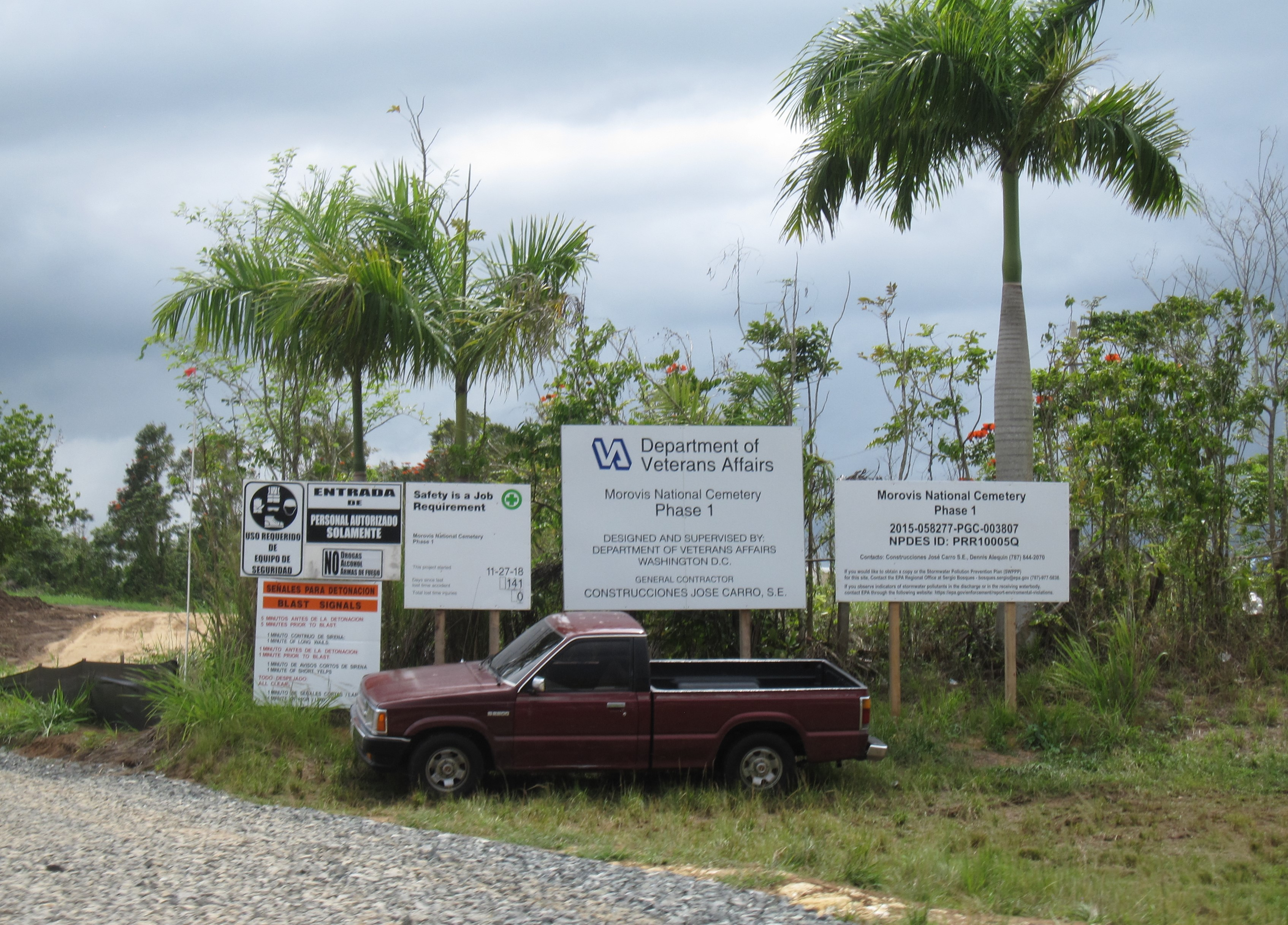
- Morovis National Cemetery during its construction
- Interactive map of Morovis National Cemetery

Details
- Established: 2020
- Location: Fránquez, Morovis, Puerto Rico
- Coordinates: 18°21′09″N 66°25′32″W
- Type: United States National Cemetery
- Owned by: Department of Veterans Affairs
- Size: 247 acres (100 ha)
- Website: www.cem.va.gov/cems/nchp/morovis.asp

Morovis National Cemetery is a United States National Cemetery located in the municipality of Morovis, in the Commonwealth of Puerto Rico. It encompasses 247.5 acres (100.2 ha) of land, and was dedicated in December 2020. This cemetery along with the Puerto Rico National Cemetery located in Bayamón, are the only United States National Cemeteries located inside Puerto Rico.

The Morovis National Cemetery was built to be operational before the cemetery in Bayamón reached full capacity.

== History ==
The Morovis National Cemetery was built in Morovis within a 247.5-acre parcel of land that can be accessed from Highway 137 at Km. 11.2. It was built to replace the existing Puerto Rico National Cemetery located in Bayamón, which would reach its capacity in 2022. It and the cemetery in Bayamón are the only two cemeteries in the United States National Cemetery System located outside the U.S.

The land for the cemetery was purchased by the United States Department of Veterans Affairs in 2013 for $7.6 million.

Construction was underway in 2019 with interments slated to begin in 2021. The U.S. Department of Veterans Affairs (VA) held a dedication ceremony for the cemetery on December 12, 2020.

The first two veterans to be interred at Morovis National Cemetery were Army Sgt. Juan Erineldo Otero Santiago and Army Specialist Jaime Sanchez Pantojas.

== Notable interments ==
The following list has the names of distinguished Puerto Ricans, and non-Puerto Rican veterans who have made Puerto Rico their home, who served in the US military and are interred there.

- Eddie Miró (1935-2024), Puerto Rican television show host, writer and comedian.

== See also ==
- List of Puerto Ricans
- List of Puerto Rican military personnel
- Atlantic Gardens Veterans Cemetery
