= Orocovis, Orocovis, Puerto Rico =

Barrio of Puerto Rico

Orocovis
- Barrio
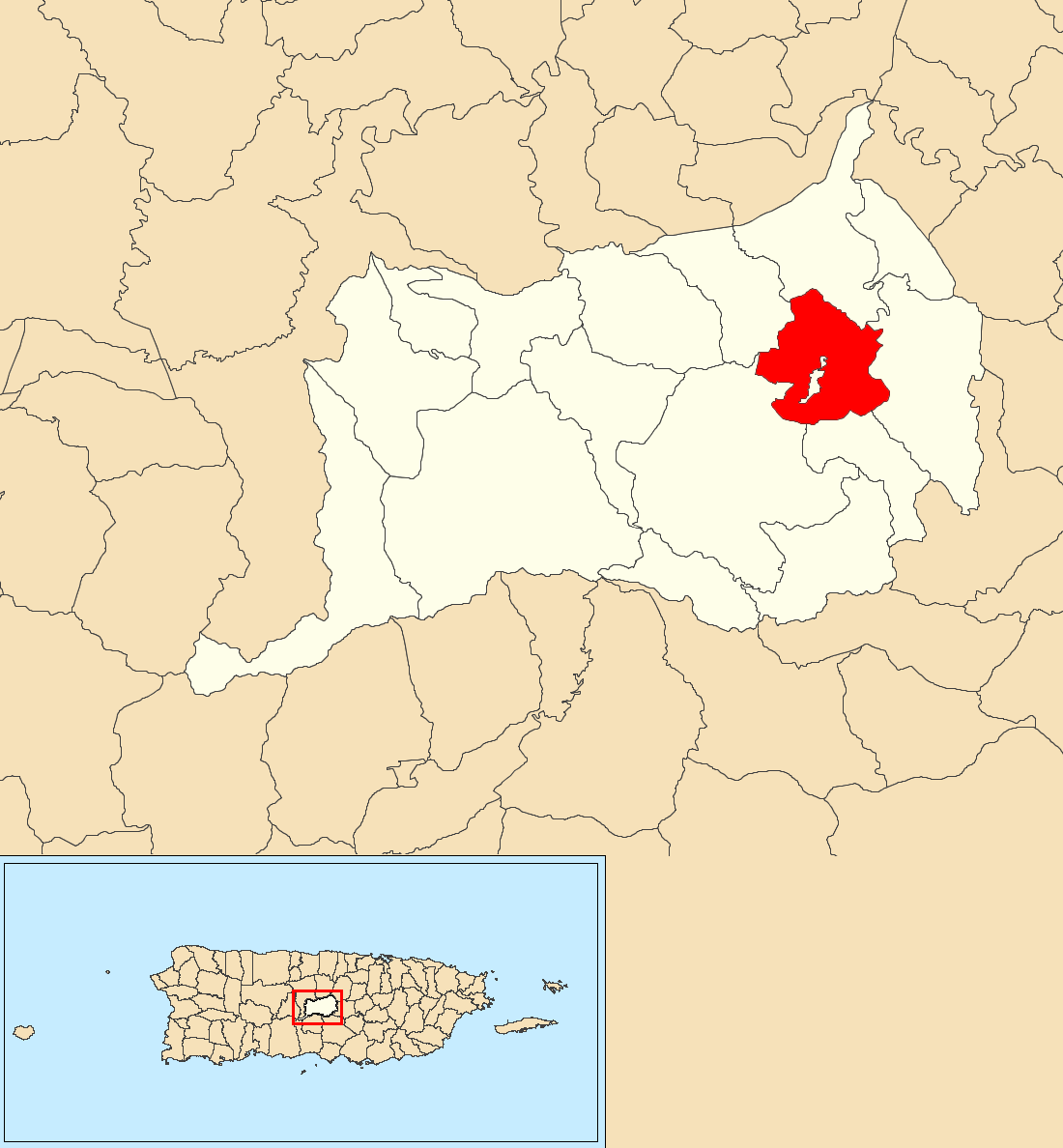
- Location of Orocovis within the municipality of Orocovis shown in red

- Location of Puerto Rico
- Coordinates: 18°13′20″N 66°22′54″W
- Commonwealth: Puerto Rico
- Municipality: Orocovis

Area
  - Total: 2.96 sq mi (7.7 km^{2})
  - Land: 2.96 sq mi (7.7 km^{2})
  - Water: 0 sq mi (0 km^{2})
- Elevation: 2,037 ft (621 m)

Population (2010)
  - Total: 3,658
  - Density: 1,235.8/sq mi (477.1/km^{2})
- Source: 2010 Census
- Time zone: UTC−4 (AST)
- ZIP Code: 00720
- Area code: 787/939

Orocovis is a barrio in the municipality of Orocovis, Puerto Rico. Its population in 2010 was 3,658.

== Sectors ==
Barrios (which are, in contemporary times, roughly comparable to minor civil divisions) in turn are further subdivided into smaller local populated place areas/units called sectores (sectors in English). The types of sectores may vary, from normally sector to urbanización to reparto to barriada to residencial, among others.

The following sectors are in Orocovis barrio:

Residencial Orocovix, Sector A.F.D.A., Sector Celso Bonilla, Sector Colinas del Pueblo, Sector Cruce de Mayo, Sector Cruz Aponte, Sector Doña Celerina, Sector El Cementerio, Sector El Flamboyán, Sector El Pueblito, Sector El Puente, Sector Emilio Rivas, Sector Julio Aponte, Sector La Fraternidad, Sector La Pizzería, Sector La Sombra, Sector La Vega, Sector Las Fábricas, Sector Las Marianas, Sector Los Dardanelos, Sector Monte Bello, Sector Olmo Rodríguez, Sector Ricos Place, Sector Salida a Barranquitas, Sector Salida a Coamo, Sector Salida a Corozal, Sector Salida a Morovis, Sector Tony Montes, Sector Villas de Orocovis, Urbanización Alturas de Orocovis, Urbanización Santa Teresita, and Urbanización Villa Cooperativa.

== History ==
Orocovis was in Spain's gazetteers until Puerto Rico was ceded by Spain in the aftermath of the Spanish–American War under the terms of the Treaty of Paris of 1898 and became an unincorporated territory of the United States. In 1899, the United States Department of War conducted a census of Puerto Rico finding that the combined population of Ala de la Piedra and Orocovis barrios was 1,403.

Historical population
| Census | Pop. | Note | %± |
|---|---|---|---|
| 1910 | 918 | | — |
| 1920 | 733 | | −20.2% |
| 1930 | 1,481 | | 102.0% |
| 1940 | 1,530 | | 3.3% |
| 1950 | 1,840 | | 20.3% |
| 1960 | 1,862 | | 1.2% |
| 1970 | 0 | | −100.0% |
| 1980 | 3,120 | | — |
| 1990 | 3,284 | | 5.3% |
| 2000 | 3,373 | | 2.7% |
| 2010 | 3,658 | | 8.4% |
U.S. Decennial Census; 1900 (N/A) 1910-1930; 1930-1950 1980-2000 2010

== See also ==
- List of communities in Puerto Rico
