= Algarrobo, Vega Baja, Puerto Rico =

Barrio of Puerto Rico

Algarrobo
- Barrio
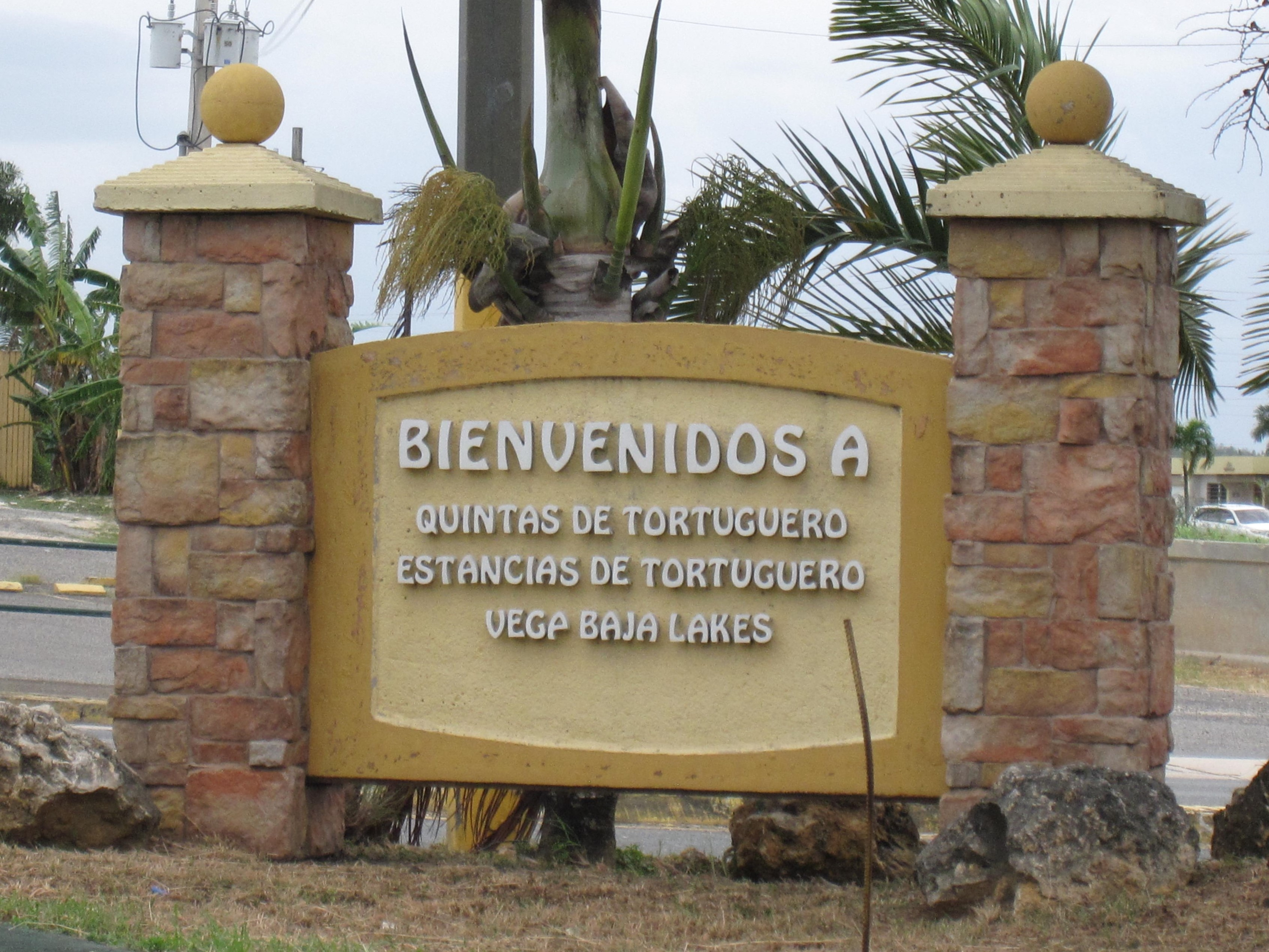
- Rock wall in Algarrobo

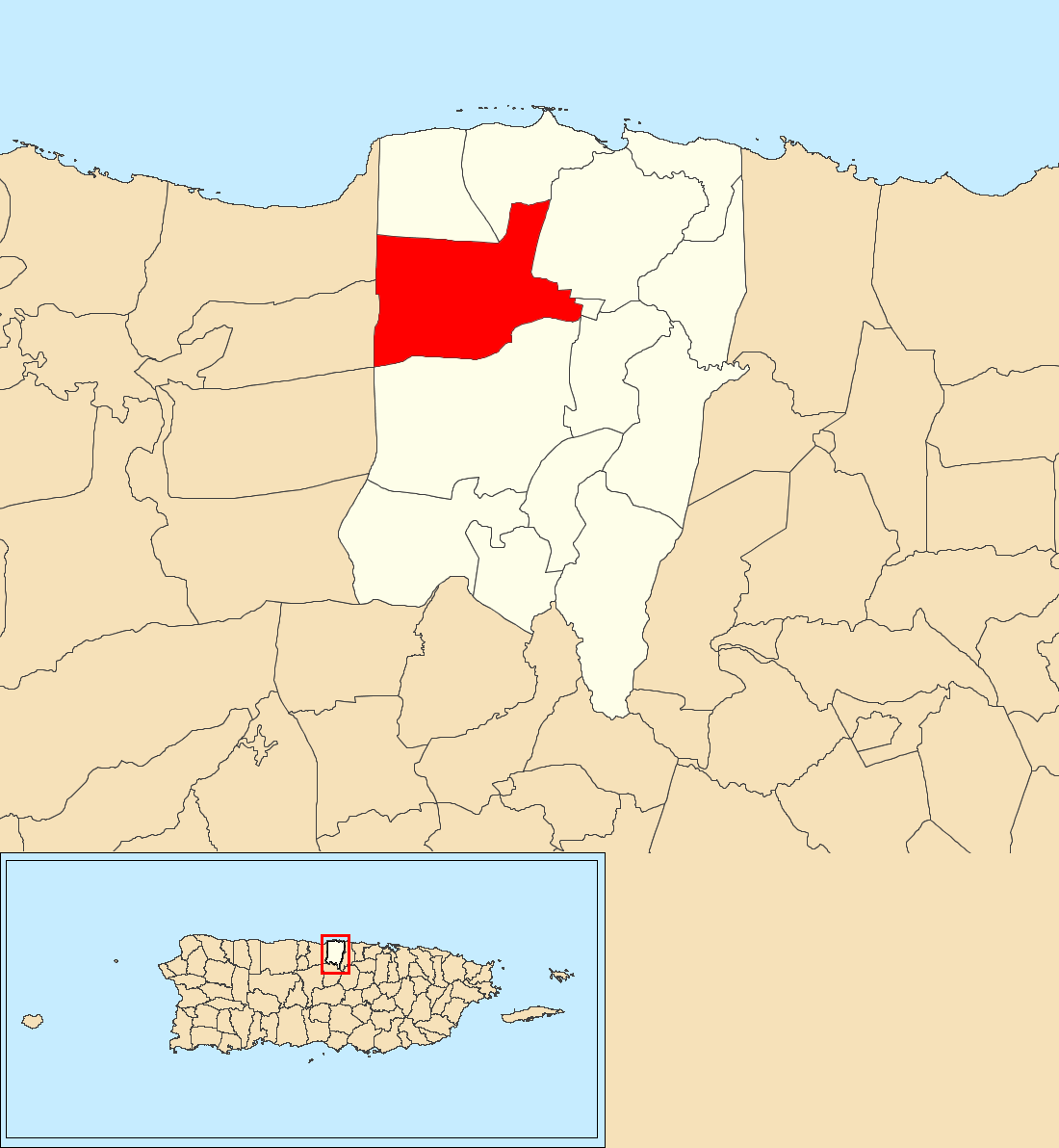
- Location of Algarrobo within the municipality of Vega Baja shown in red

- Location of Puerto Rico
- Coordinates: 18°27′14″N 66°25′38″W
- Commonwealth: Puerto Rico
- Municipality: Vega Baja

Area
  - Total: 5.70 sq mi (14.8 km^{2})
  - Land: 5.43 sq mi (14.1 km^{2})
  - Water: 0.27 sq mi (0.70 km^{2})
- Elevation: 66 ft (20 m)

Population (2010)
  - Total: 15,764
  - Density: 2,892.5/sq mi (1,116.8/km^{2})
- Source: 2010 Census
- Time zone: UTC−4 (AST)
- ZIP Code: 00693
- Area codes: 787, 939

Algarrobo is a barrio in the municipality of Vega Baja, Puerto Rico. Its population in 2010 was 15,764.

== Geography ==
According to the United States Census Bureau, in 2010 the barrio had a total area of 5.70 square miles (14.8 km^{2}) square miles, including 5.43 square miles (14.1 km^{2}) square miles of land and 0.27 square miles (0.70 km^{2}) square miles of water.

== History ==
Algarrobo was in Spain's gazetteers until Puerto Rico was ceded by Spain in the aftermath of the Spanish–American War under the terms of the Treaty of Paris of 1898 and became an unincorporated territory of the United States. In 1899, the United States Department of War conducted a census of Puerto Rico finding that the population of Algarrobo barrio was 877.

Historical population
Census	Pop.	Note	%±
1900	877		—
1910	1,184		35.0%
1920	1,376		16.2%
1930	1,727		25.5%
1940	1,962		13.6%
1950	3,833		95.4%
1960	4,753		24.0%
1970	0		−100.0%
1980	11,037		—
1990	13,757		24.6%
2000	16,562		20.4%
2010	15,764		−4.8%
U.S. Decennial Census; 1899 (shown as 1900) 1910-1930; 1930-1950 1960 1970 1980-2000 2010

== Sectors and features ==
Barrios (which are, in contemporary times, roughly comparable to minor civil divisions) in turn are further subdivided into smaller local populated place areas/units called sectores (sectors in English). The types of sectores may vary, from normally sector to urbanización to reparto to barriada to residencial, among others.

The following sectors are in Algarrobo barrio: Comunidad Colombo, Comunidad Ojo de Agua, Urb. Jardines, Urb. Ext. Guarico, Urb. Guarico, Urb. Clara del Sol, Brisas de Tortuguero, Urb. Pisos Reales, Urb. Ciudad Real, Urb. Quintas de Tortuguero, Urb. Estancias de Tortuguero, Urb. Camino del Sol I & II, Sector Los Sostre, Reparto Alexandra, Camino Los Pizarro, haciendas Baudilio, Reparto Curiel, Sector La Quince, Reparto Providencia, Reparto Latania, Sector Villa Blanca, Sector Los Marrero, El Criollo, Barriada Collazo, El Verde, Urb. Monte Carlo, Cuesta Carrillo, Callejón Mr. Vélez, Reparto Sobrino 1, 2 & 3, Miss Kelly, Combate, Barrio Chino, Los Díaz, Los Pérez, Los Pachanga, Parcelas Márquez, Barrio Lindo, Urb. Arboleda, and Vega Baja Lakes.

Part of the Laguna Tortuguero is located in Algarrobo.

== Notable people ==
- Baseball hall-of-famer Iván Rodríguez

== Gallery ==
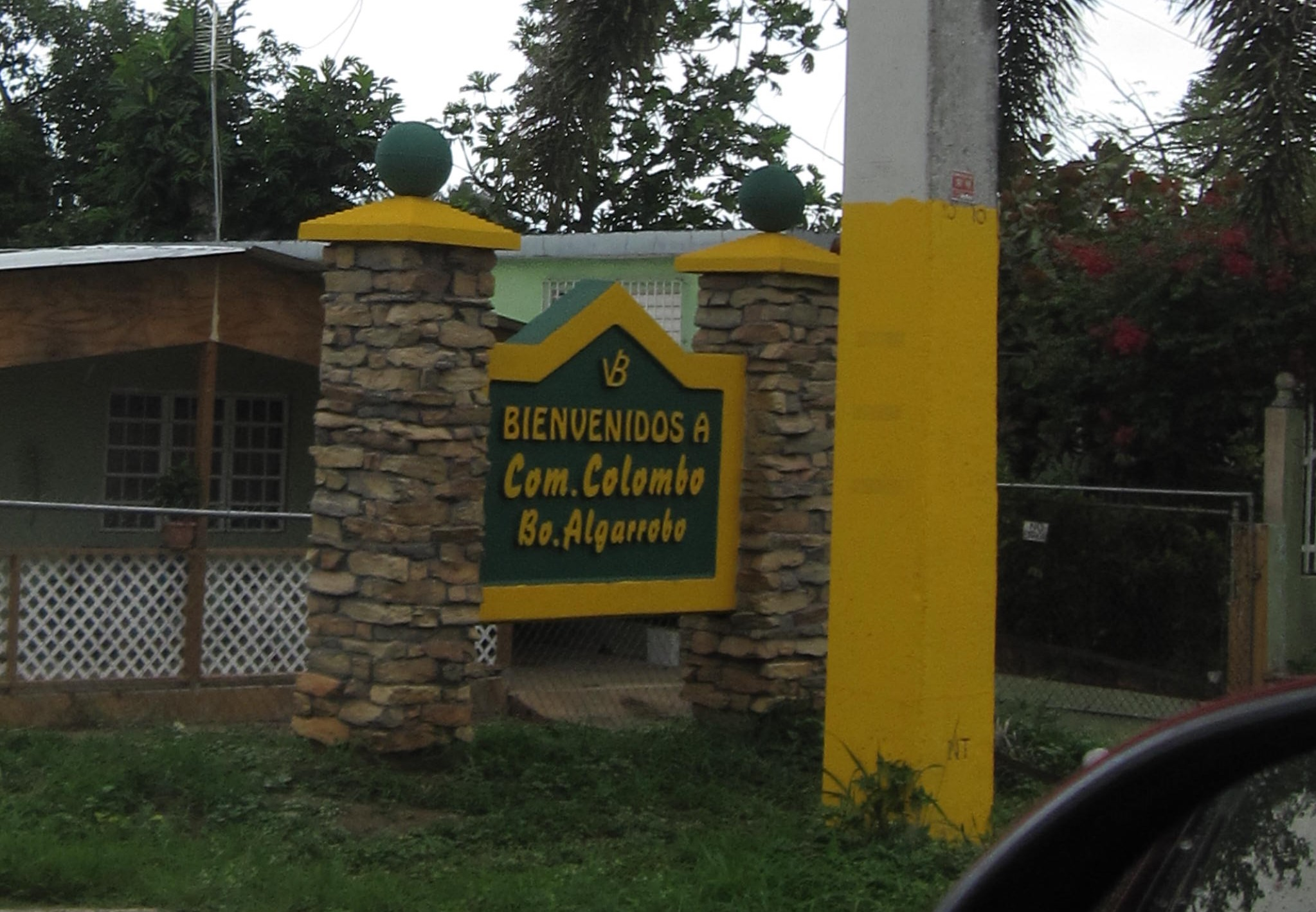
Comunidad Colombo

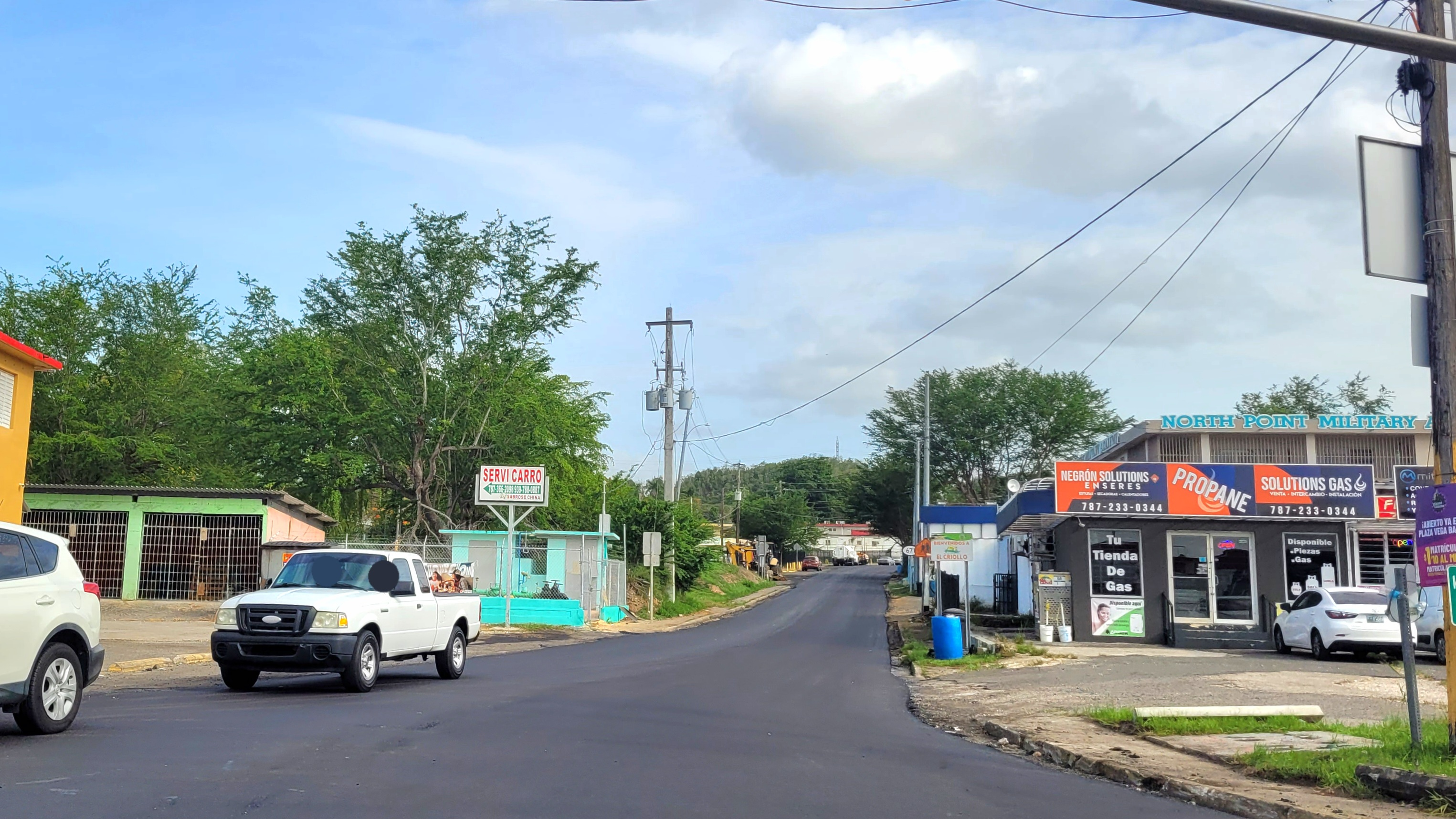
Puerto Rico Highway 671 in Algarrobo

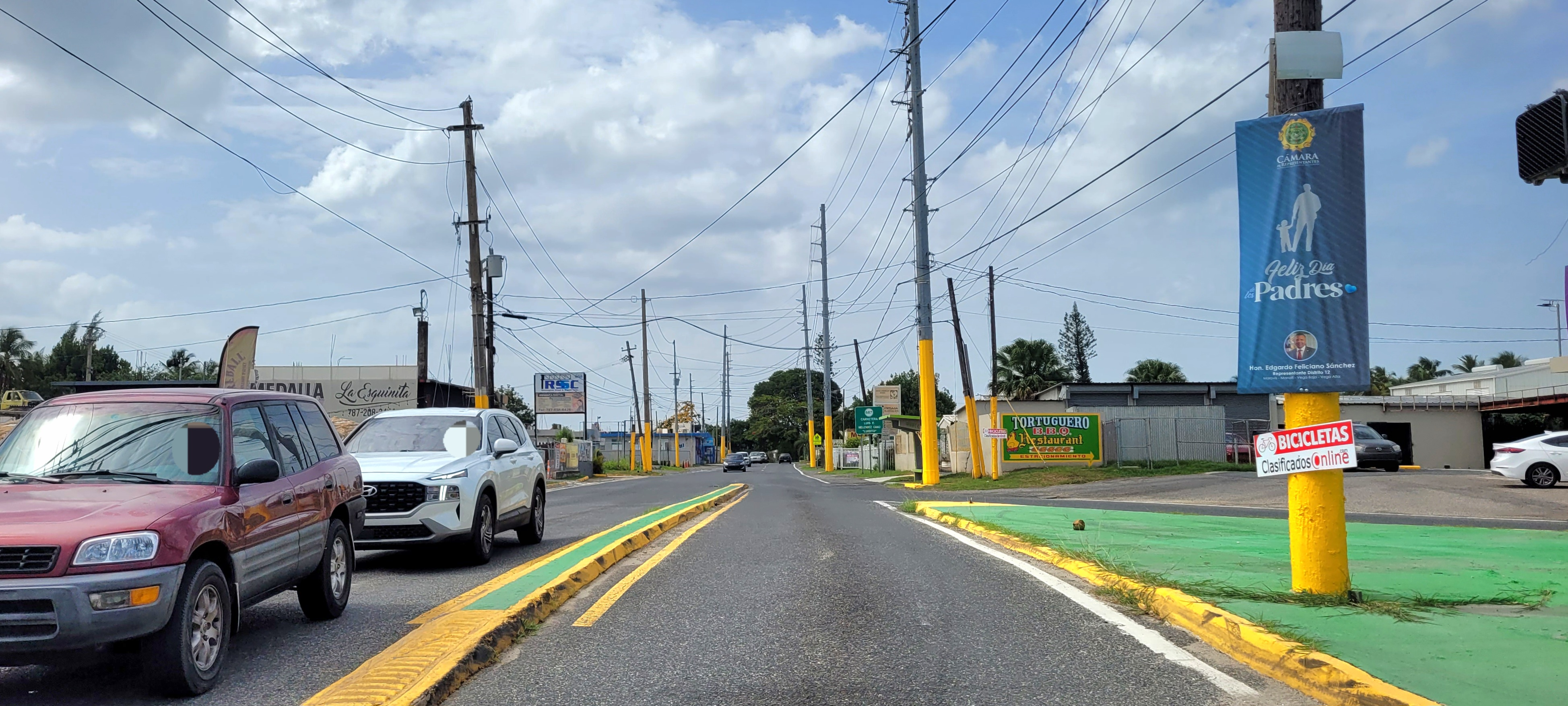
Puerto Rico Highway 687 in Algarrobo

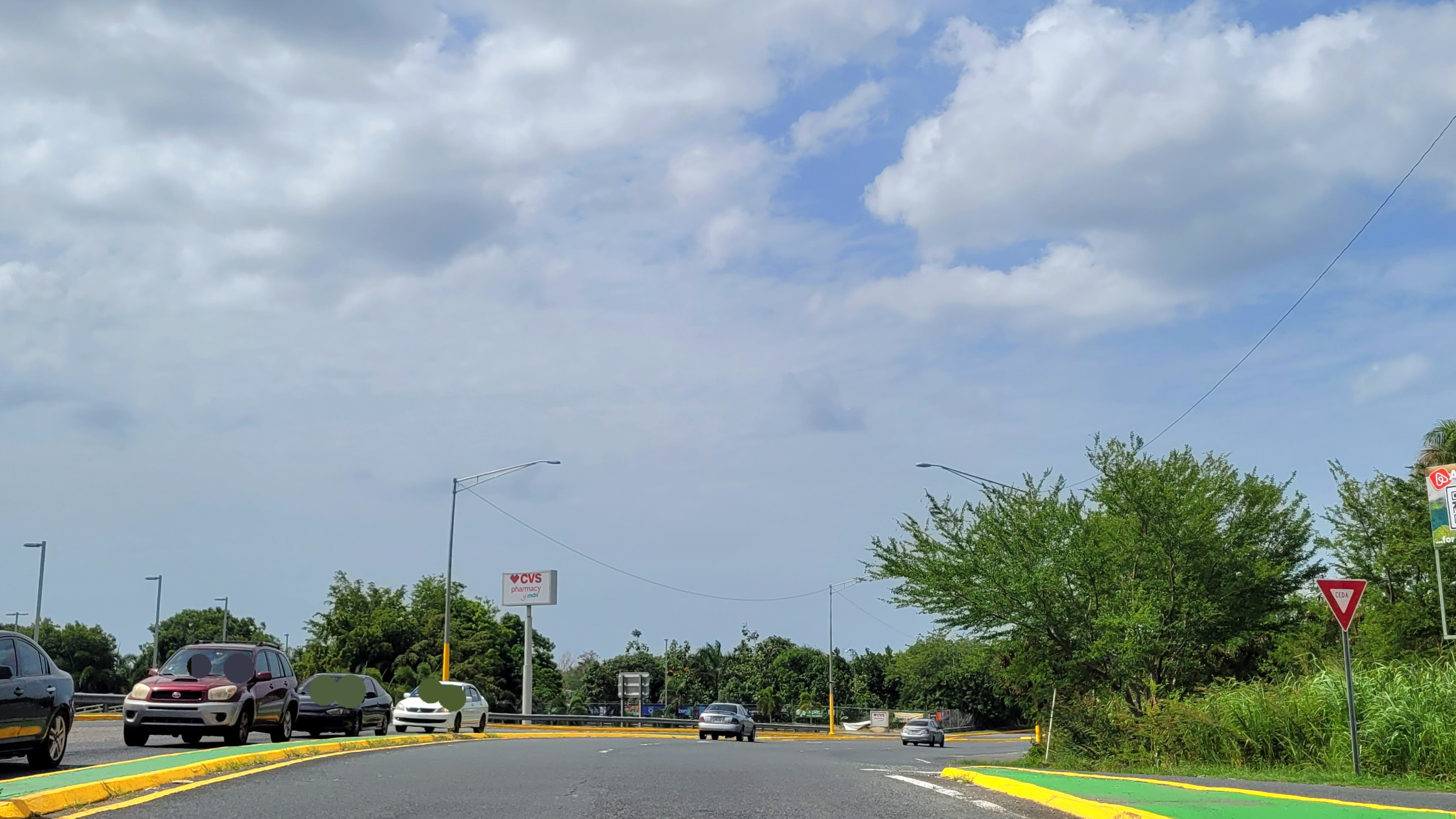
Puerto Rico Highway 6671 in Algarrobo

== See also ==
- List of communities in Puerto Rico
