= Morovis Norte =

Barrio of Morovis, Puerto Rico

- Barrio
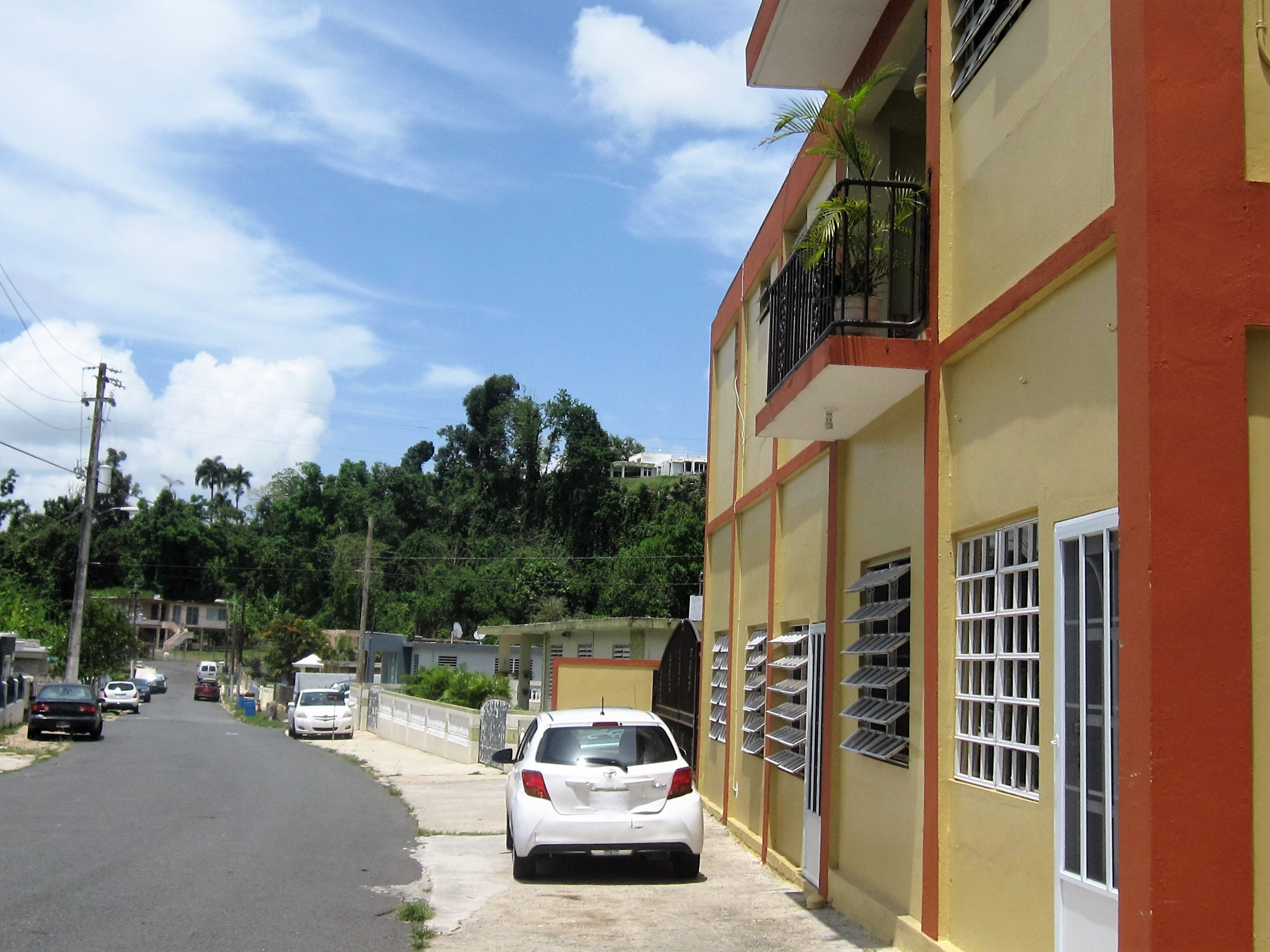
- Maga Street in Morovis Norte

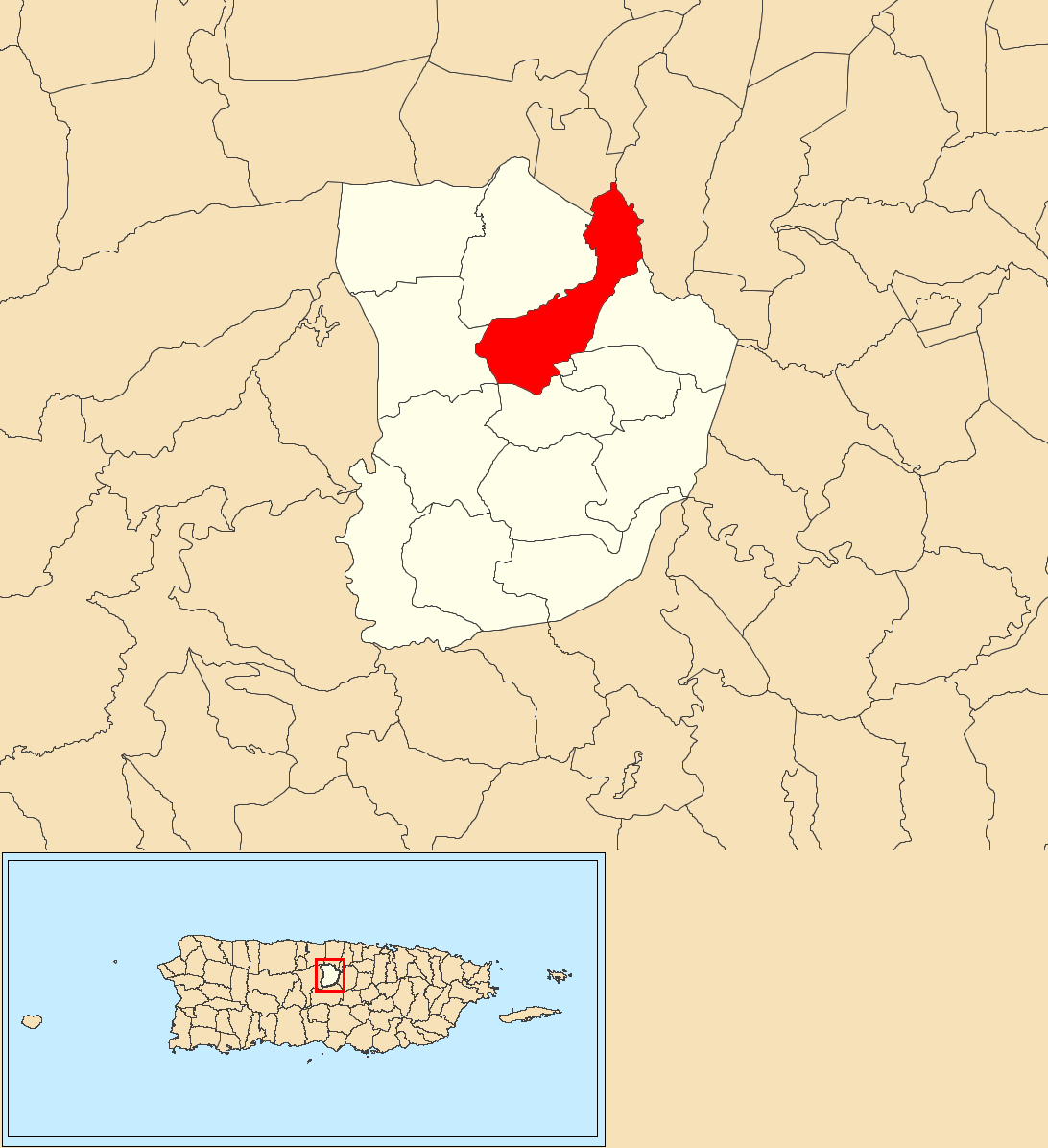
- Location of Morovis Norte within the municipality of Morovis shown in red

- Location of Puerto Rico
- Coordinates: 18°20′30″N 66°24′28″W
- Commonwealth: Puerto Rico
- Municipality: Morovis

Area
  - Total: 3.31 sq mi (8.6 km^{2})
  - Land: 3.31 sq mi (8.6 km^{2})
  - Water: 0 sq mi (0 km^{2})
- Elevation: 518 ft (158 m)

Population (2010)
  - Total: 3,546
  - Density: 1,071.3/sq mi (413.6/km^{2})
- Source: 2010 Census
- Time zone: UTC−4 (AST)
- Zip code: 00687

Morovis Norte is a barrio in the municipality of Morovis, Puerto Rico. Morovis Norte has about 15 sectors and its population in 2010 was 3,546.

== History ==
Morovis Norte was in Spain's gazetteers until Puerto Rico was ceded by Spain in the aftermath of the Spanish–American War under the terms of the Treaty of Paris of 1898 and became an unincorporated territory of the United States. In 1899, the United States Department of War conducted a census of Puerto Rico finding that the population of Morovis Norte barrio was 821.

Puente Colorao (Red Bridge) at kilometer 50 on PR-155 and over the Indio River in Morovis Norte, leads to the expressway and to Morovis barrio-pueblo, the downtown area with the municipal buildings and a number of stores. It is a bridge that was built by the United States Army Corps of Engineers in 1913. In June 2020, it was closed for repairs. Bridge repairs were completed and the bridge reopened for traffic in late 2023.

Historical population
Census	Pop.	Note	%±
1900	821		—
1910	976		18.9%
1920	1,090		11.7%
1930	1,563		43.4%
1940	1,698		8.6%
1950	1,838		8.2%
1960	1,520		−17.3%
1970	0		−100.0%
1980	1,393		—
1990	2,556		83.5%
2000	3,257		27.4%
2010	3,546		8.9%
U.S. Decennial Census; 1899 (shown as 1900) 1910-1930; 1930-1950 1980-2000 2010

== Sectors ==
Barrios (which are roughly comparable to minor civil divisions) in turn are further subdivided into smaller local populated place areas/units called sectores (sectors in English). The types of sectores may vary, from normally sector to urbanización to reparto to barriada to residencial, among others.

The following sectors are in Morovis Norte barrio:

Apartamentos Santiago, Sector Buena Vista, Sector El Cerro, Sector El Tendal, Sector Hoyo Frío, Sector La Línea, Sector Los Russe, Sector Puente Colorao, Urbanización Brisas del Norte, Urbanización Cruz Rosario, Urbanización Jardines de Romaní, Urbanización Las Cumbres, Urbanización Quintas de Morovis, Urbanización Tajaomar, and Urbanización Villas Del Norte.

== Gallery ==
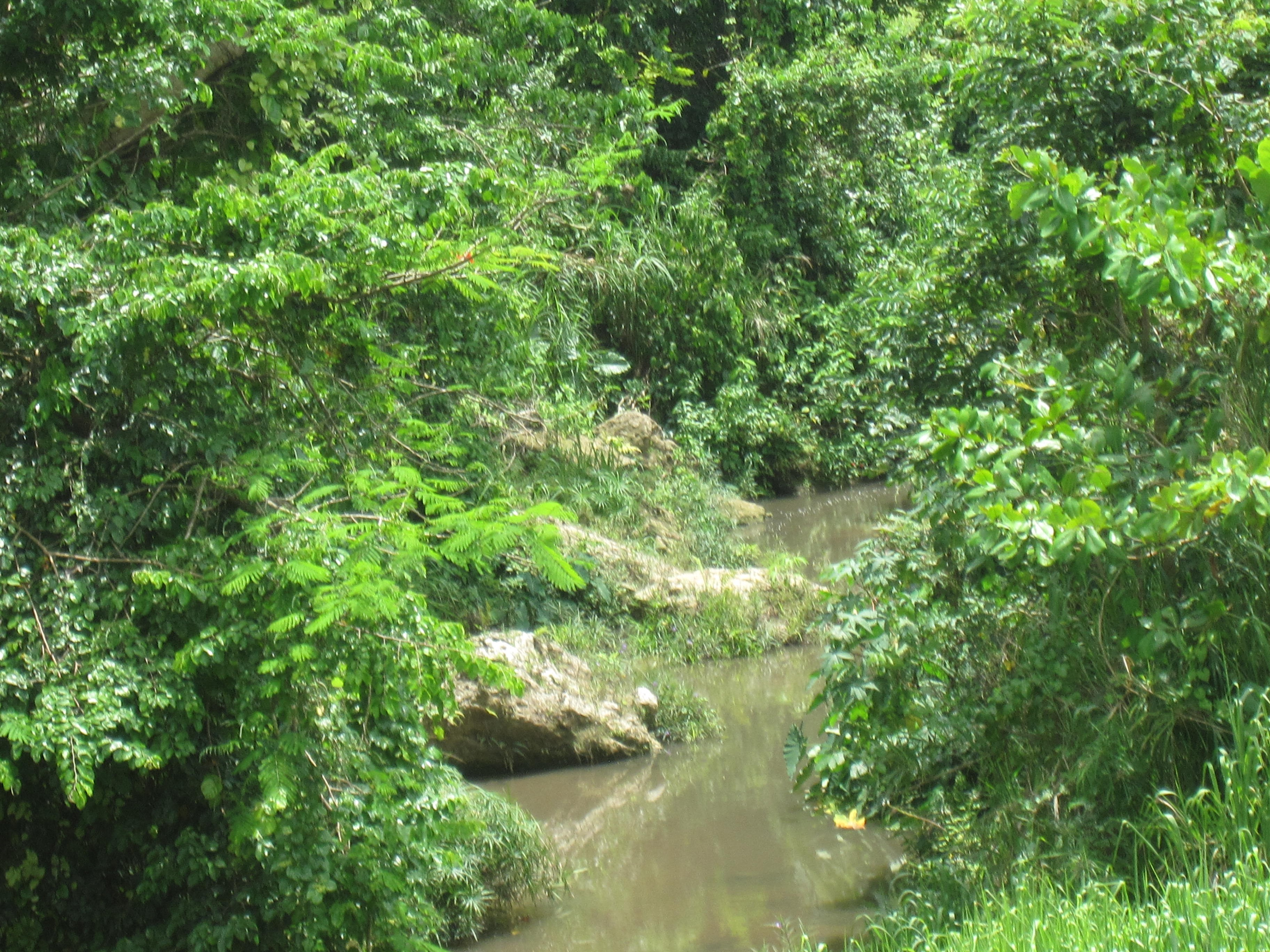
Indio River from Red Bridge (Puente Colorao) in Morovis Norte

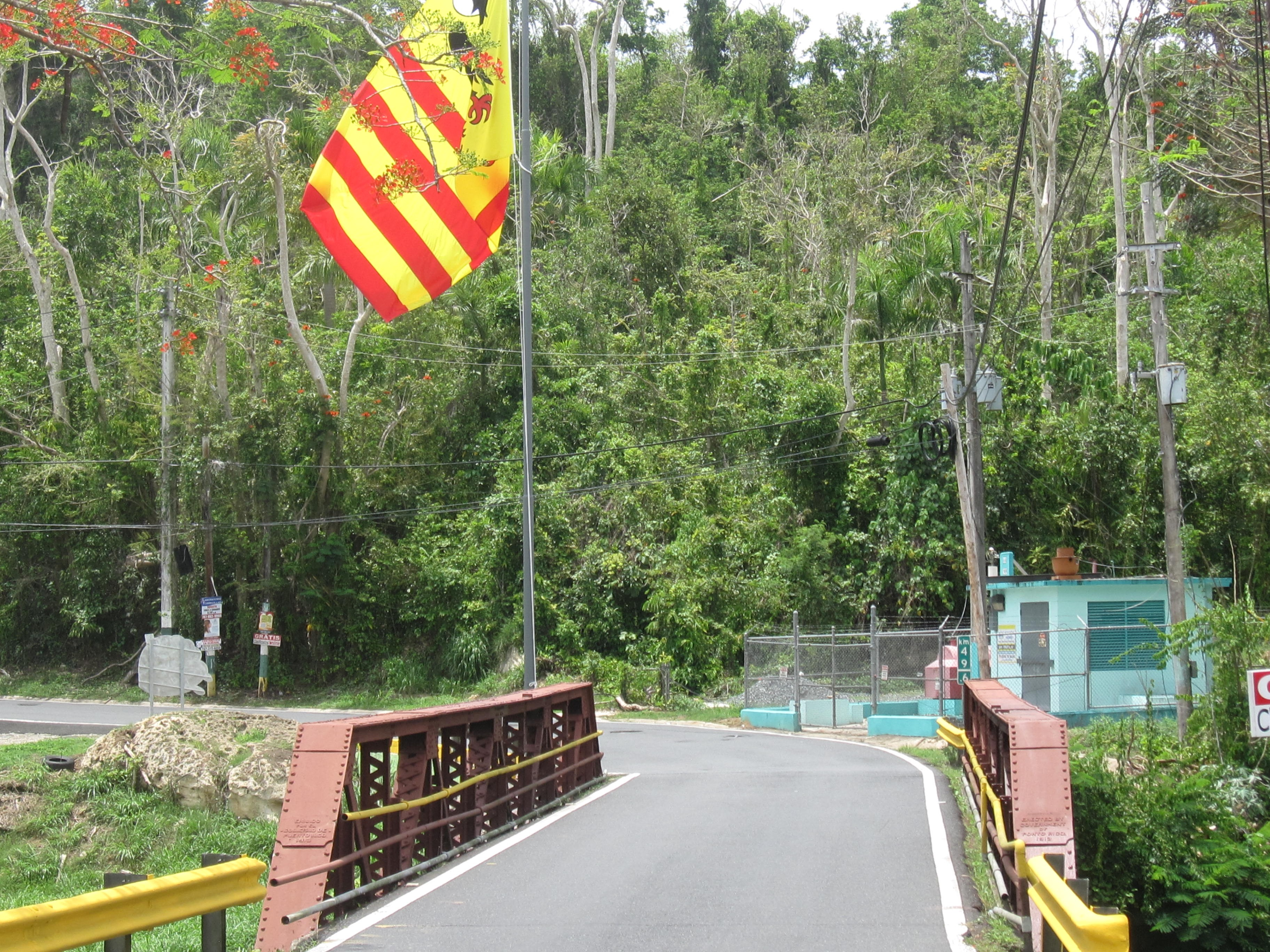
Red Bridge in Sector Puente Colorao

== See also ==
- List of communities in Puerto Rico
