= Pugnado Adentro =

Barrio of Vega Baja, Puerto Rico

- Barrio
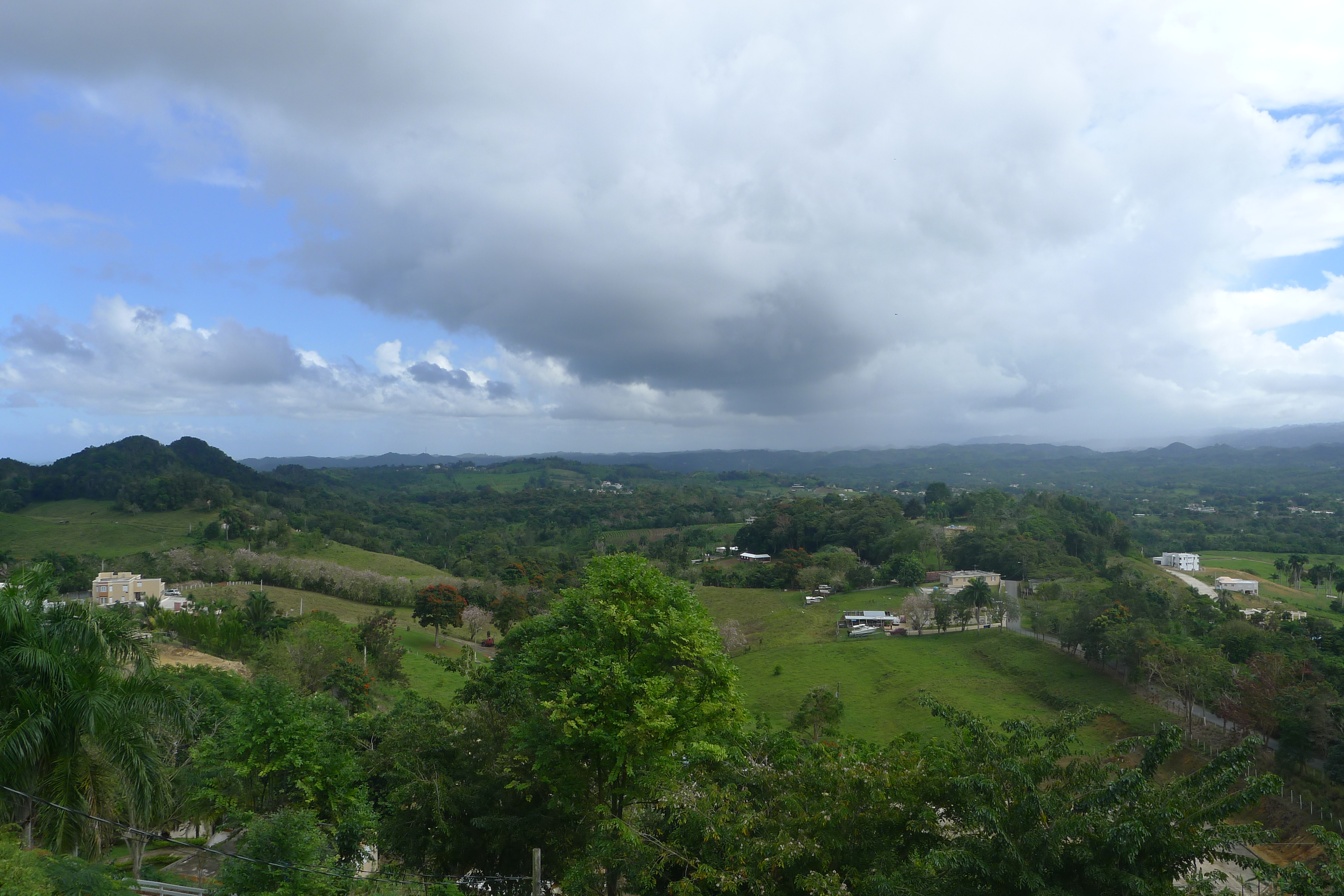
- Pugnado Adentro panorama

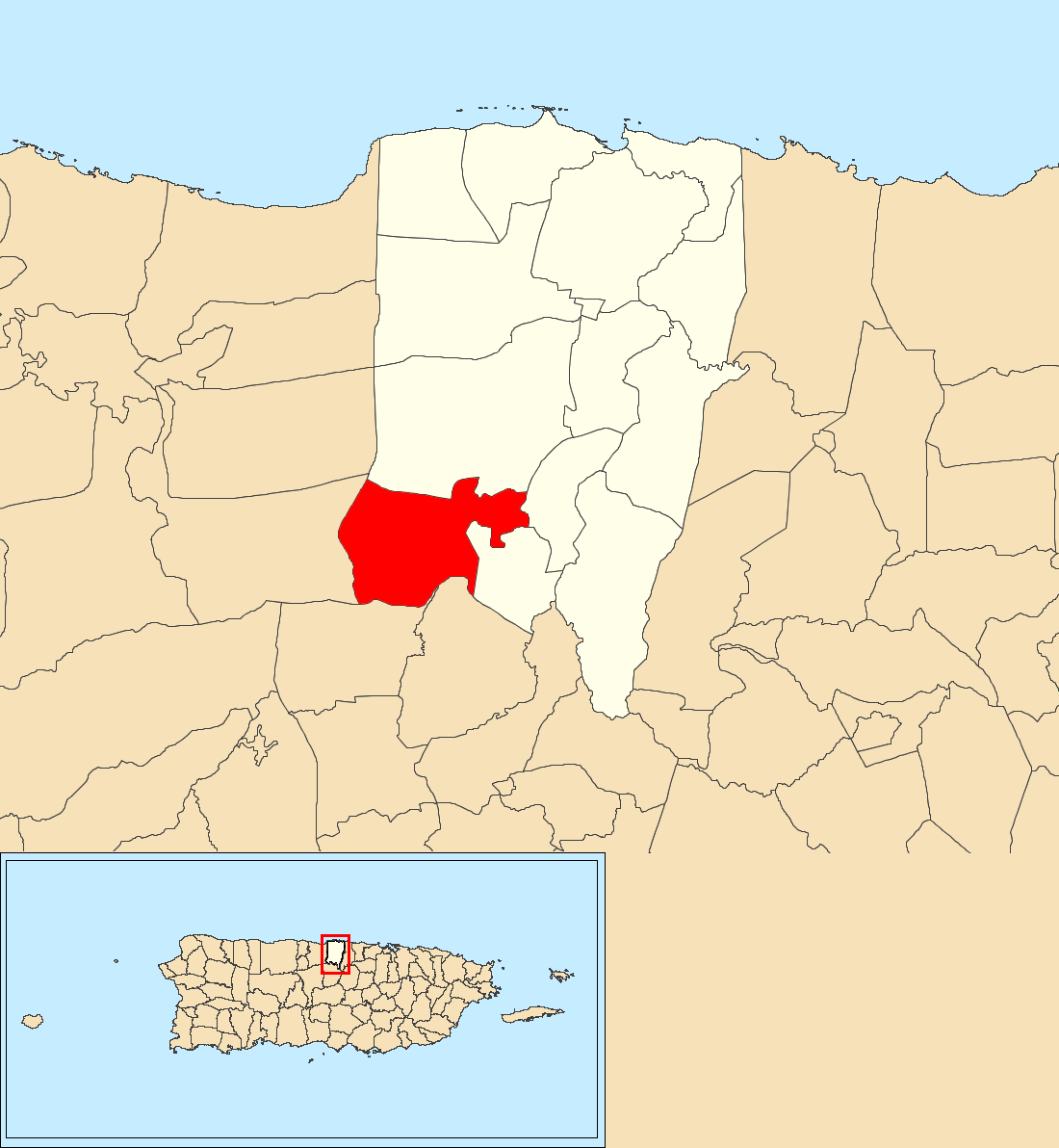
- Location of Pugnado Adentro within the municipality of Vega Baja shown in red

- Location of Puerto Rico
- Coordinates: 18°23′32″N 66°25′44″W
- Commonwealth: Puerto Rico
- Municipality: Vega Baja

Area
  - Total: 4.2 sq mi (11 km^{2})
  - Land: 4.2 sq mi (11 km^{2})
  - Water: 0 sq mi (0 km^{2})
- Elevation: 535 ft (163 m)

Population (2010)
  - Total: 1,278
  - Density: 305/sq mi (118/km^{2})
- Source: 2010 Census
- Time zone: UTC−4 (AST)

Pugnado Adentro is a barrio in the municipality of Vega Baja, Puerto Rico. Its population in 2010 was 1,278.

== History ==
Pugnado Adentro was in Spain's gazetteers until Puerto Rico was ceded by Spain in the aftermath of the Spanish–American War under the terms of the Treaty of Paris of 1898 and became an unincorporated territory of the United States. In 1899, the United States Department of War conducted a census of Puerto Rico finding that the population of Pugnado Adentro barrio was 425.

Historical population
Census	Pop.	Note	%±
1900	425		—
1910	706		66.1%
1920	1,273		80.3%
1930	1,415		11.2%
1940	1,515		7.1%
1950	1,537		1.5%
1960	1,230		−20.0%
1970	1,316		7.0%
1980	981		−25.5%
1990	1,192		21.5%
2000	1,327		11.3%
2010	1,278		−3.7%
U.S. Decennial Census; 1899 (shown as 1900) 1910-1930; 1930-1950 1960 1980-2000 2010

== See also ==
- List of communities in Puerto Rico
