= Pugnado Afuera =

Barrio of Vega Baja, Puerto Rico

- Barrio
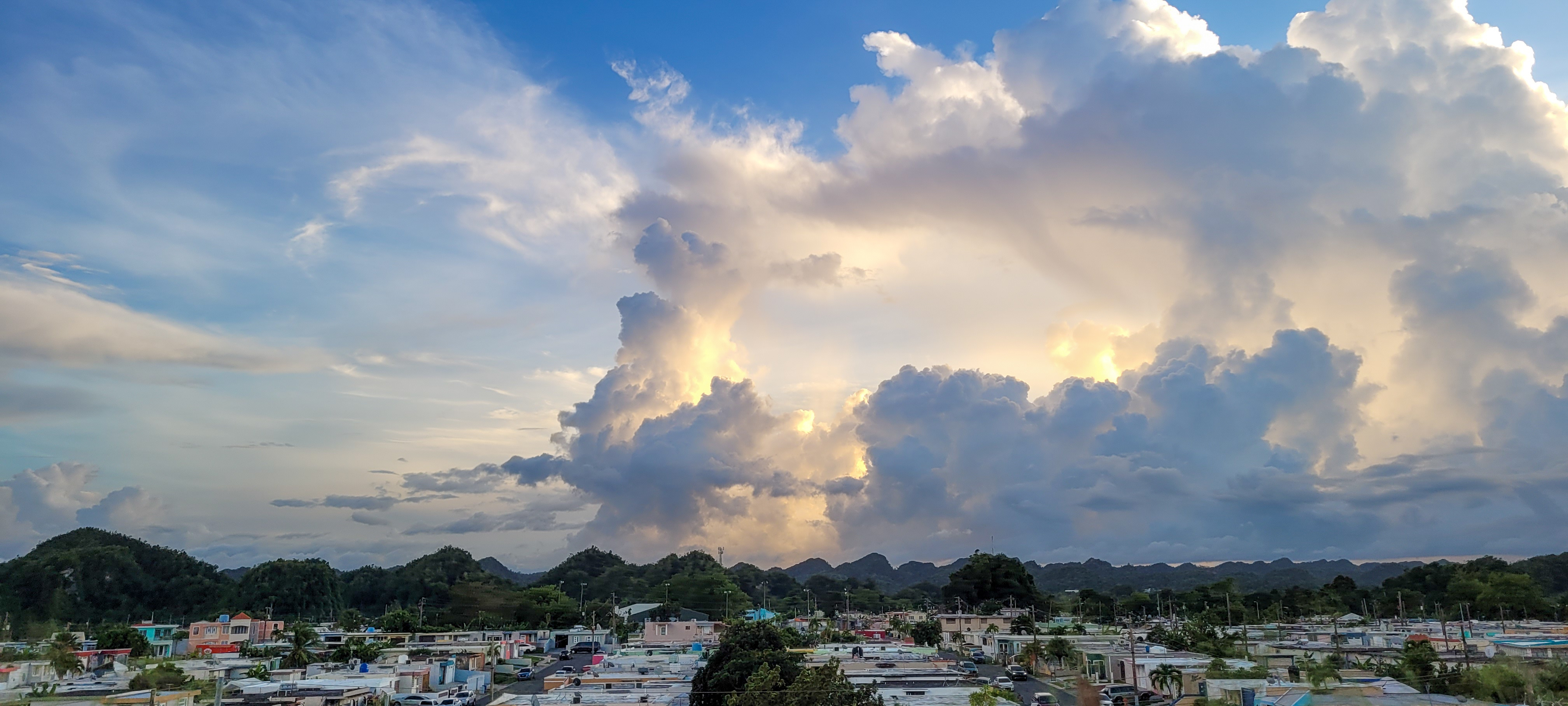
- Sunset from Pugnado Afuera

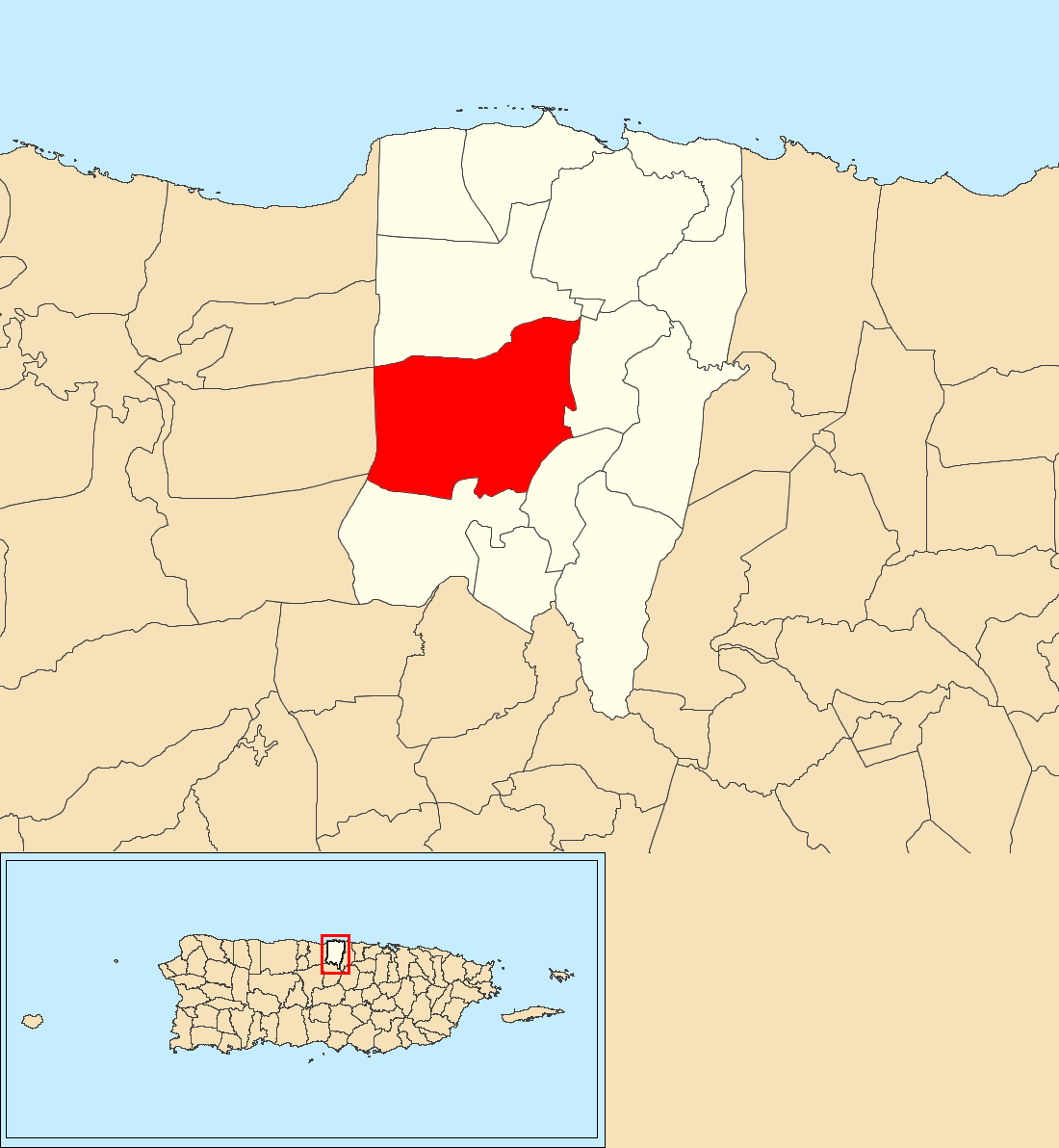
- Location of Pugnado Afuera within the municipality of Vega Baja shown in red

- Location of Puerto Rico
- Coordinates: 18°25′04″N 66°24′53″W
- Commonwealth: Puerto Rico
- Municipality: Vega Baja

Area
  - Total: 7.41 sq mi (19.2 km^{2})
  - Land: 7.41 sq mi (19.2 km^{2})
  - Water: 0 sq mi (0 km^{2})
- Elevation: 318 ft (97 m)

Population (2010)
  - Total: 11,808
  - Density: 1,593.5/sq mi (615.3/km^{2})
- Source: 2010 Census
- Time zone: UTC−4 (AST)
- ZIP code: 00693

Pugnado Afuera is a barrio in the municipality of Vega Baja, Puerto Rico. Its population in 2010 was 11,808.

== History ==
Pugnado Afuera was in Spain's gazetteers until Puerto Rico was ceded by Spain in the aftermath of the Spanish–American War under the terms of the Treaty of Paris of 1898 and became an unincorporated territory of the United States. In 1899, the United States Department of War conducted a census of Puerto Rico finding that the population of Pugnado Afuera barrio was 1,336.

Historical population
Census	Pop.	Note	%±
1900	1,336		—
1910	1,541		15.3%
1920	2,209		43.3%
1930	2,819		27.6%
1940	2,828		0.3%
1950	3,051		7.9%
1960	4,674		53.2%
1970	0		−100.0%
1980	8,224		—
1990	10,796		31.3%
2000	11,959		10.8%
2010	11,808		−1.3%
U.S. Decennial Census; 1899 (shown as 1900) 1910-1930; 1930-1950 1960 1980-2000 2010

== Gallery ==
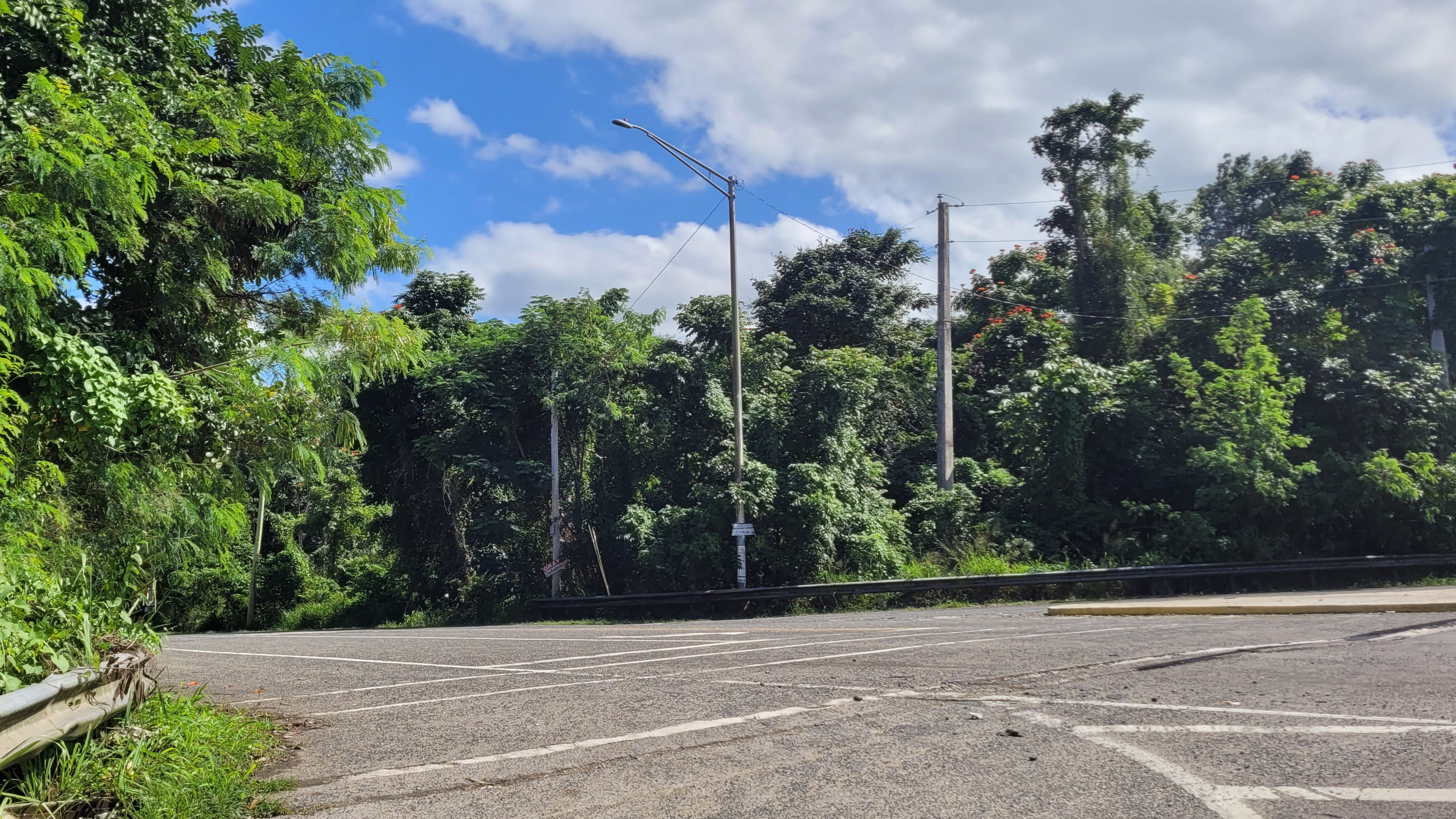
Puerto Rico Highway 644 in Pugnado Afuera

== See also ==
- List of communities in Puerto Rico
