= Fránquez, Morovis, Puerto Rico =

Barrio of Puerto Rico

Fránquez
- Barrio
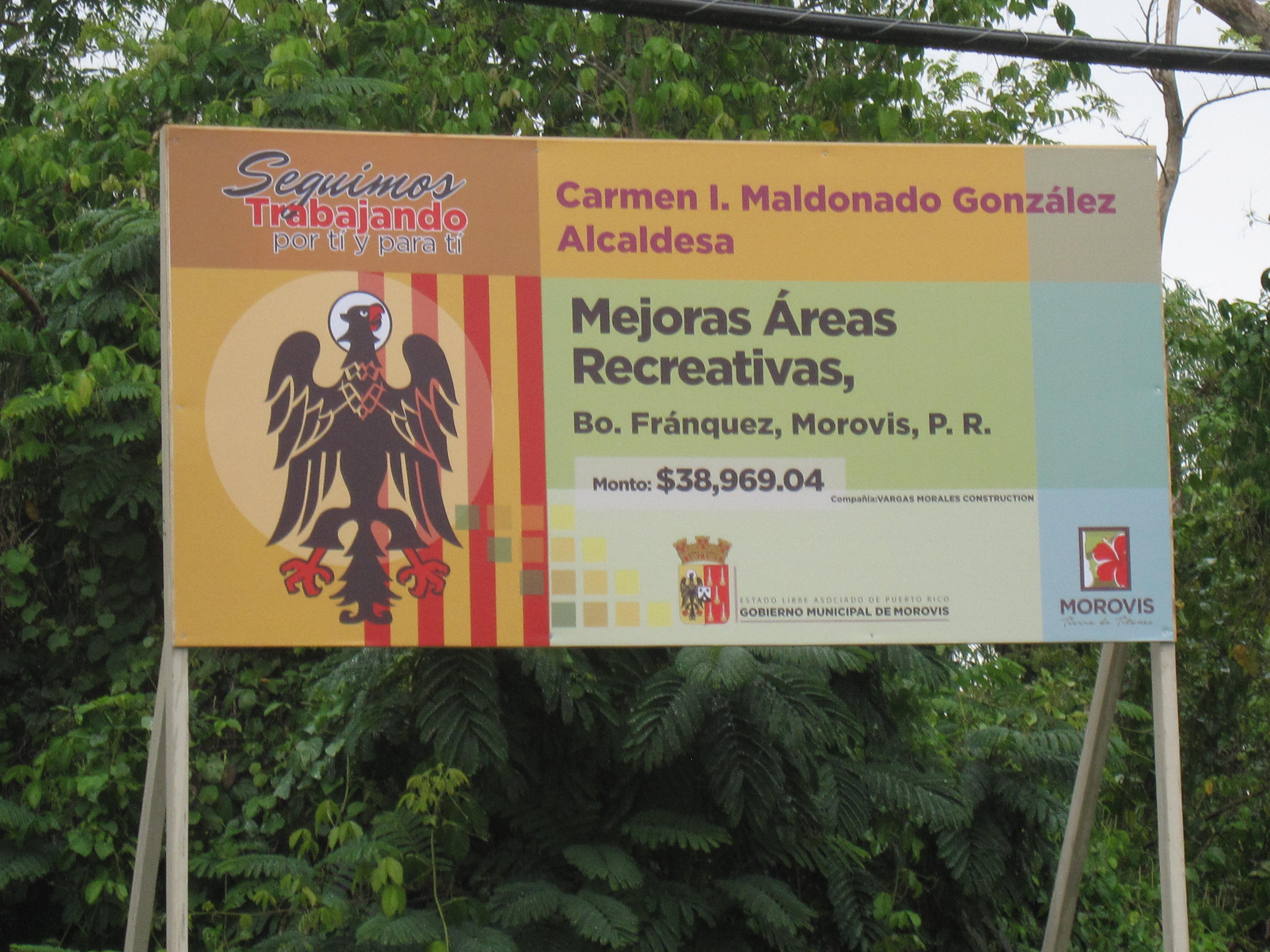
- Sign indicating improvements to recreational centers in Fránquez

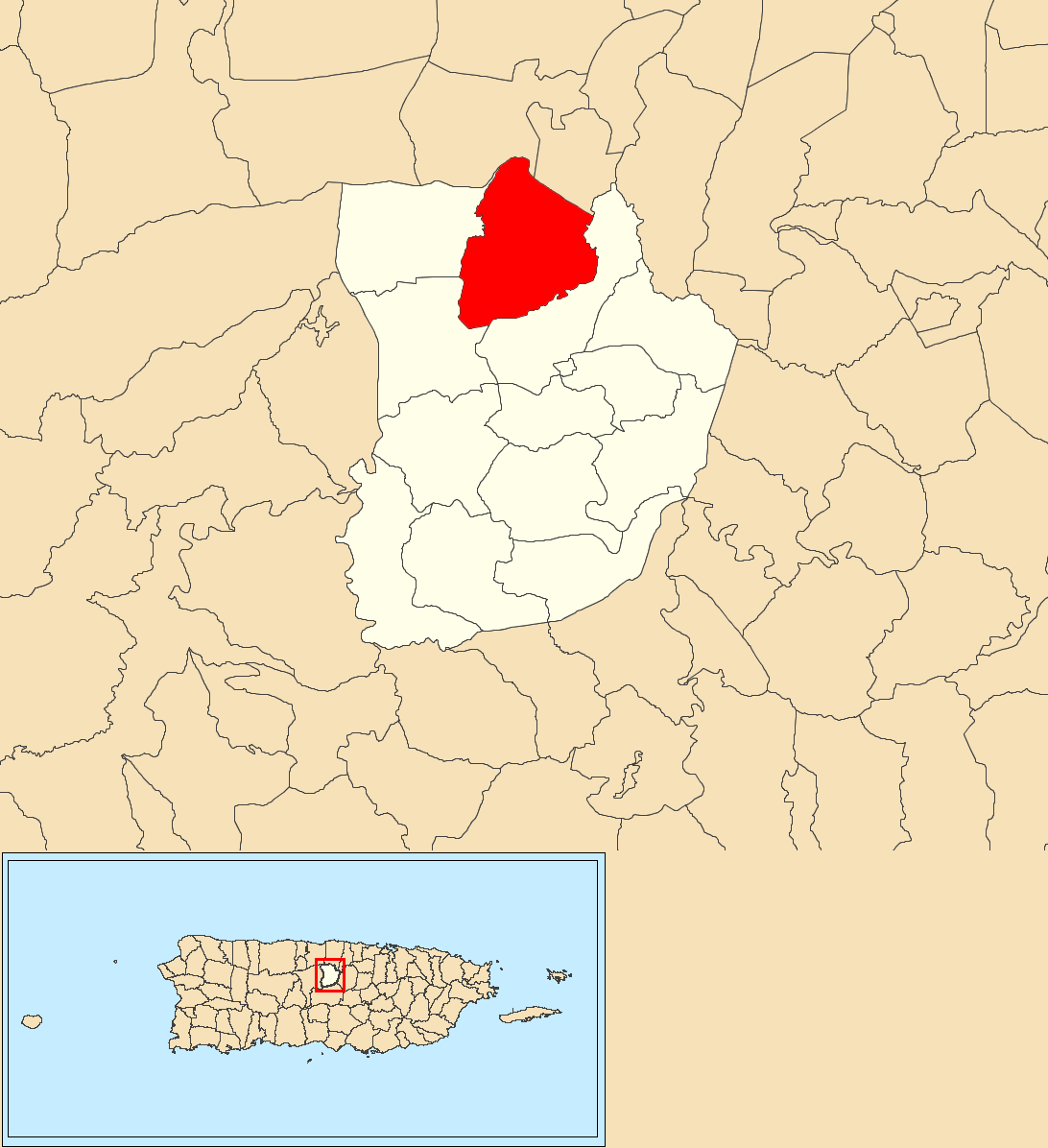
- Location of Fránquez within the municipality of Morovis shown in red

- Location of Puerto Rico
- Coordinates: 18°21′19″N 66°25′07″W
- Commonwealth: Puerto Rico
- Municipality: Morovis

Area
  - Total: 4.2 sq mi (11 km^{2})
  - Land: 4.2 sq mi (11 km^{2})
  - Water: 0 sq mi (0 km^{2})
- Elevation: 443 ft (135 m)

Population (2010)
  - Total: 4,583
  - Density: 1,091.2/sq mi (421.3/km^{2})
- Source: 2010 Census
- Time zone: UTC−4 (AST)
- Zip code: 00687

Fránquez is a barrio in the municipality of Morovis, Puerto Rico. Fránquez has twelve sectors and its population in 2010 was 4,583.

== History ==
Fránquez was in Spain's gazetteers until Puerto Rico was ceded by Spain in the aftermath of the Spanish–American War under the terms of the Treaty of Paris of 1898 and became an unincorporated territory of the United States. In 1899, the United States Department of War conducted a census of Puerto Rico finding that the population of Fránquez barrio was 695.

Historical population
Census	Pop.	Note	%±
1900	695		—
1910	766		10.2%
1920	843		10.1%
1930	1,185		40.6%
1940	1,299		9.6%
1950	1,269		−2.3%
1960	2,034		60.3%
1970	2,509		23.4%
1980	3,602		43.6%
1990	3,843		6.7%
2000	4,205		9.4%
2010	4,583		9.0%
U.S. Decennial Census; 1899 (shown as 1900) 1910-1930; 1930-1950 1980-2000 2010

Like all municipalities of Puerto Rico, Morovis was hit hard by Hurricane Maria on September 20, 2017. More than six months after Hurricane Irma, which had occurred just prior to Maria, the community's school still remained without power.

== Sectors ==
Barrios (which are, in contemporary times, roughly comparable to minor civil divisions) in turn are further subdivided into smaller local populated place areas/units called sectores (sectors in English). The types of sectores may vary, from normally sector to urbanización to reparto to barriada to residencial, among others.

The following sectors are in Fránquez barrio:

Comunidad Fránquez, Sector Alianza, Sector Dávila, Sector Los Rosario, Sector Meléndez, Sector Narváez, Sector Pabón, Sector Pedro Meléndez Sánchez, Sector Rolón, Sector Rosado, Sector Socucho, and Urbanización La Alianza.

== Gallery ==
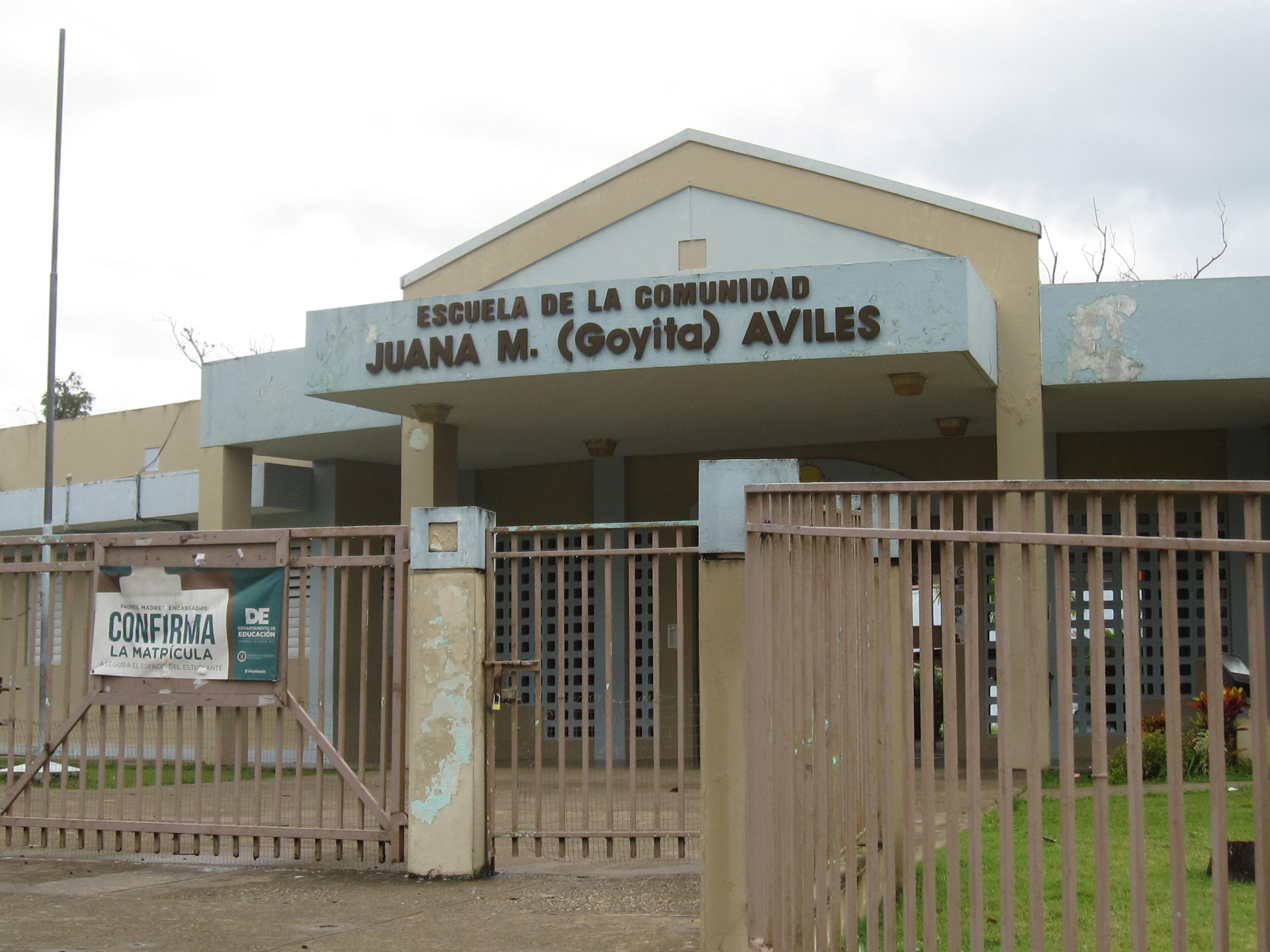
Juana M. (Goyita) Avilés school in Franquez

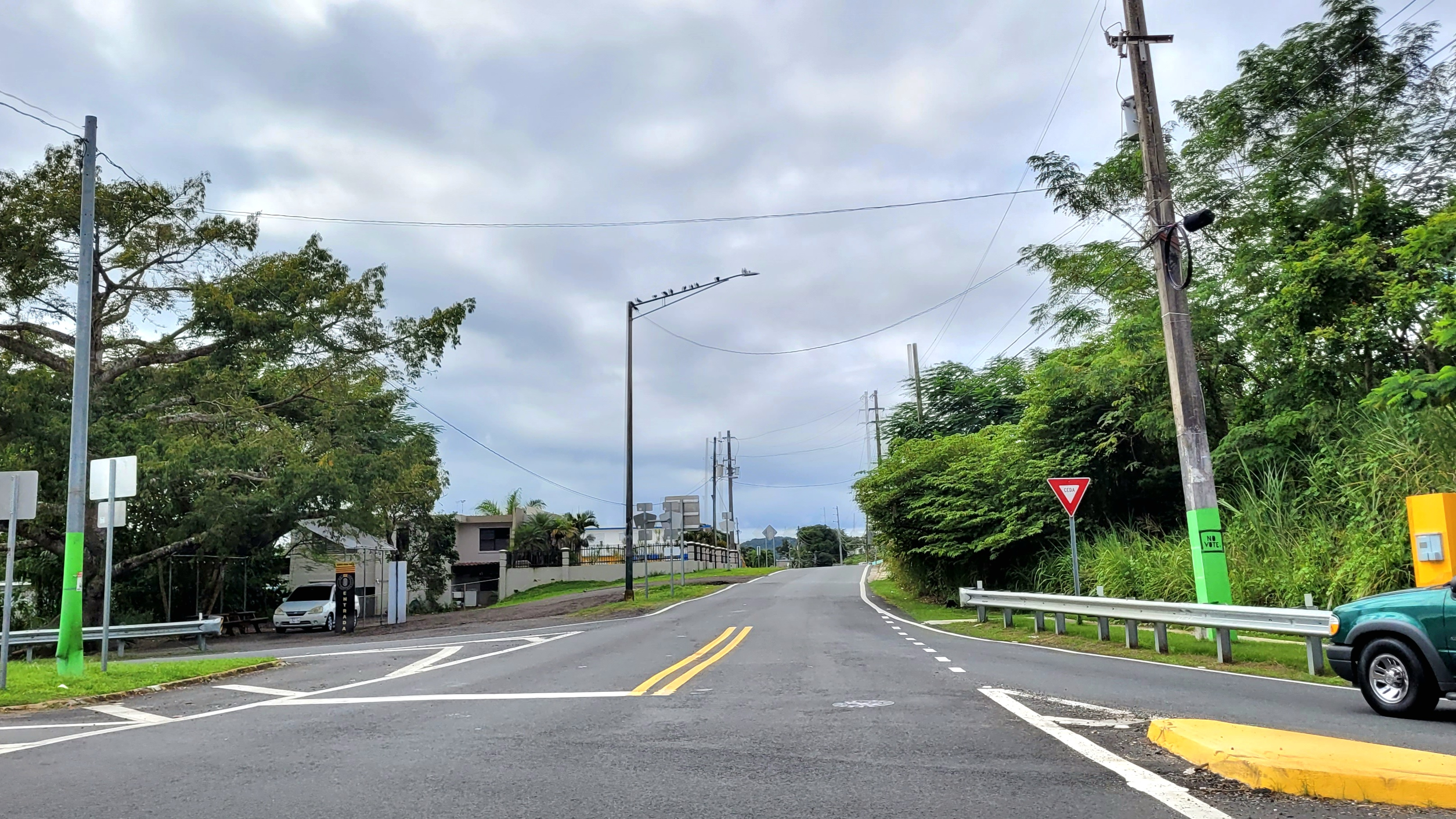
Puerto Rico Highway 634 in Fránquez

== See also ==
- List of communities in Puerto Rico
