= San Lorenzo, Morovis, Puerto Rico =

Barrio of Puerto Rico

San Lorenzo
- Barrio
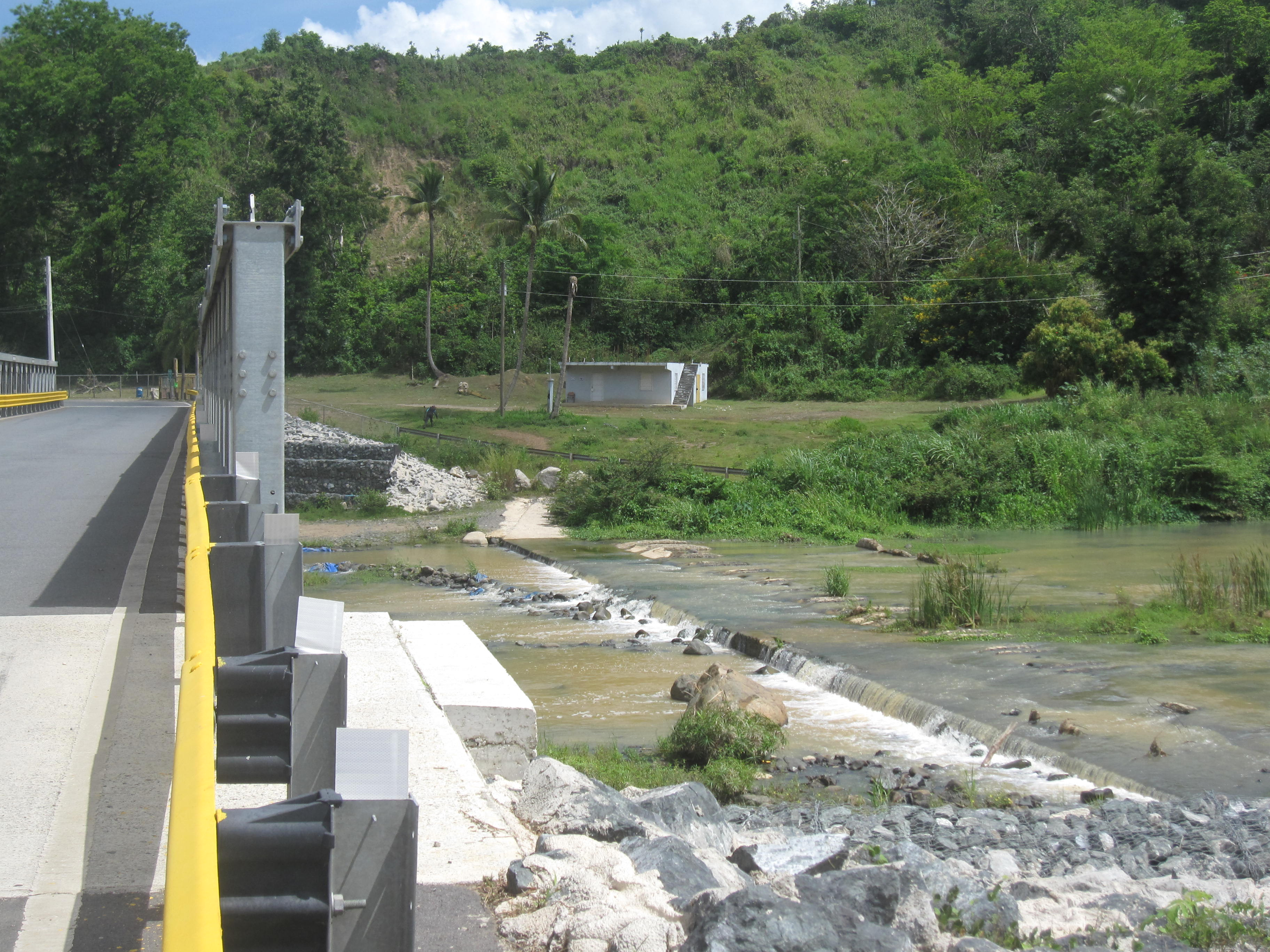
- Puente La Esperanza over Morovis River in San Lorenzo

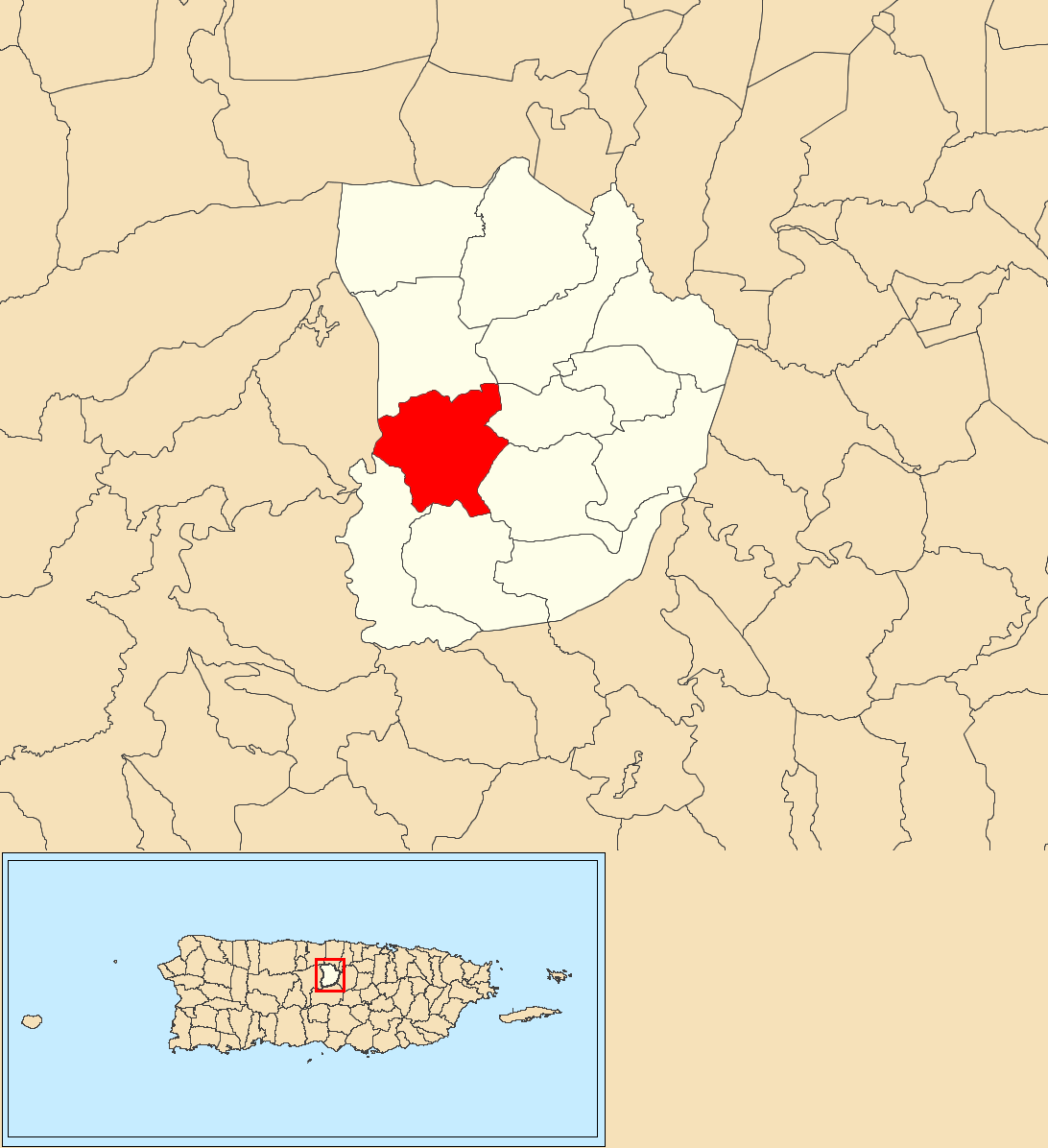
- Location of San Lorenzo within the municipality of Morovis shown in red

- Location of Puerto Rico
- Coordinates: 18°18′22″N 66°26′33″W
- Commonwealth: Puerto Rico
- Municipality: Morovis

Area
  - Total: 3.14 sq mi (8.1 km^{2})
  - Land: 3.09 sq mi (8.0 km^{2})
  - Water: 0.05 sq mi (0.13 km^{2})
- Elevation: 239 ft (73 m)

Population (2010)
  - Total: 1,209
  - Density: 391.3/sq mi (151.1/km^{2})
- Source: 2010 Census
- Time zone: UTC−4 (AST)
- Zip code: 00687

San Lorenzo is a barrio in the municipality of Morovis, Puerto Rico. San Lorenzo has six sectors and its population in 2010 was 1,209.

== History ==
San Lorenzo was in Spain's gazetteers until Puerto Rico was ceded by Spain in the aftermath of the Spanish–American War under the terms of the Treaty of Paris of 1898 and became an unincorporated territory of the United States. In 1899, the United States Department of War conducted a census of Puerto Rico finding that the population of San Lorenzo barrio was 884.

Historical population
Census	Pop.	Note	%±
1900	884		—
1910	920		4.1%
1920	1,124		22.2%
1930	1,266		12.6%
1940	1,678		32.5%
1950	1,304		−22.3%
1960	1,228		−5.8%
1970	1,054		−14.2%
1980	1,047		−0.7%
1990	1,427		36.3%
2000	844		−40.9%
2010	1,209		43.2%
U.S. Decennial Census; 1899 (shown as 1900) 1910-1930; 1930-1950 1980-2000 2010

Clandestine car races took place in San Lorenzo for many years until an accident on July 18, 1998, claimed the lives of five people. Legal action was taken against police for not having stopped the races from occurring. The races had been very popular, with 5,000 to 6,000 spectators on hand, until they were ended.

San Lorenzo in Morovis was one of the areas of Puerto Rico heavily impacted by Hurricane Maria on September 20, 2017, with washed away bridges and loss of power for months.

San Lorenzo was left isolated when Hurricane Maria washed away their main bridge with the PR-567 highway, into and out of the barrio. An old highway which sits directly on the waters of the river is sometimes passable albeit dangerous. The old road always being washed by the river, was at times passable and was being used by residents, (including school buses), until the construction of a temporary bridge was completed in April, 2018. The alternative to traversing the bridge, or the old highway over the river, is an hour-long drive.

The construction of a bridge for the isolated community was completed in April 2018 and the bridge was named La Esperanza (Hope) in 2019.

== Geography ==
San Lorenzo barrio is south of Torrecillas, west of Morovis Sur and Río Grande and north of Pasto and Vaga barrios. San Lorenzo's west border is with the municipality of Ciales.

== Sectors ==
Barrios (which are, in contemporary times, roughly comparable to minor civil divisions) in turn are further subdivided into smaller local populated place areas/units called sectores (sectors in English). The types of sectores may vary, from normally sector to urbanización to reparto to barriada to residencial, among others.

The following sectors are in San Lorenzo barrio:

Parcelas San Lorenzo, Sector Berio, Sector El Rayo, Sector El Salto, Sector La Prá, and Sector Marrero.

== Gallery ==
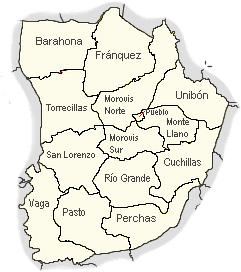
Barrios of Morovis

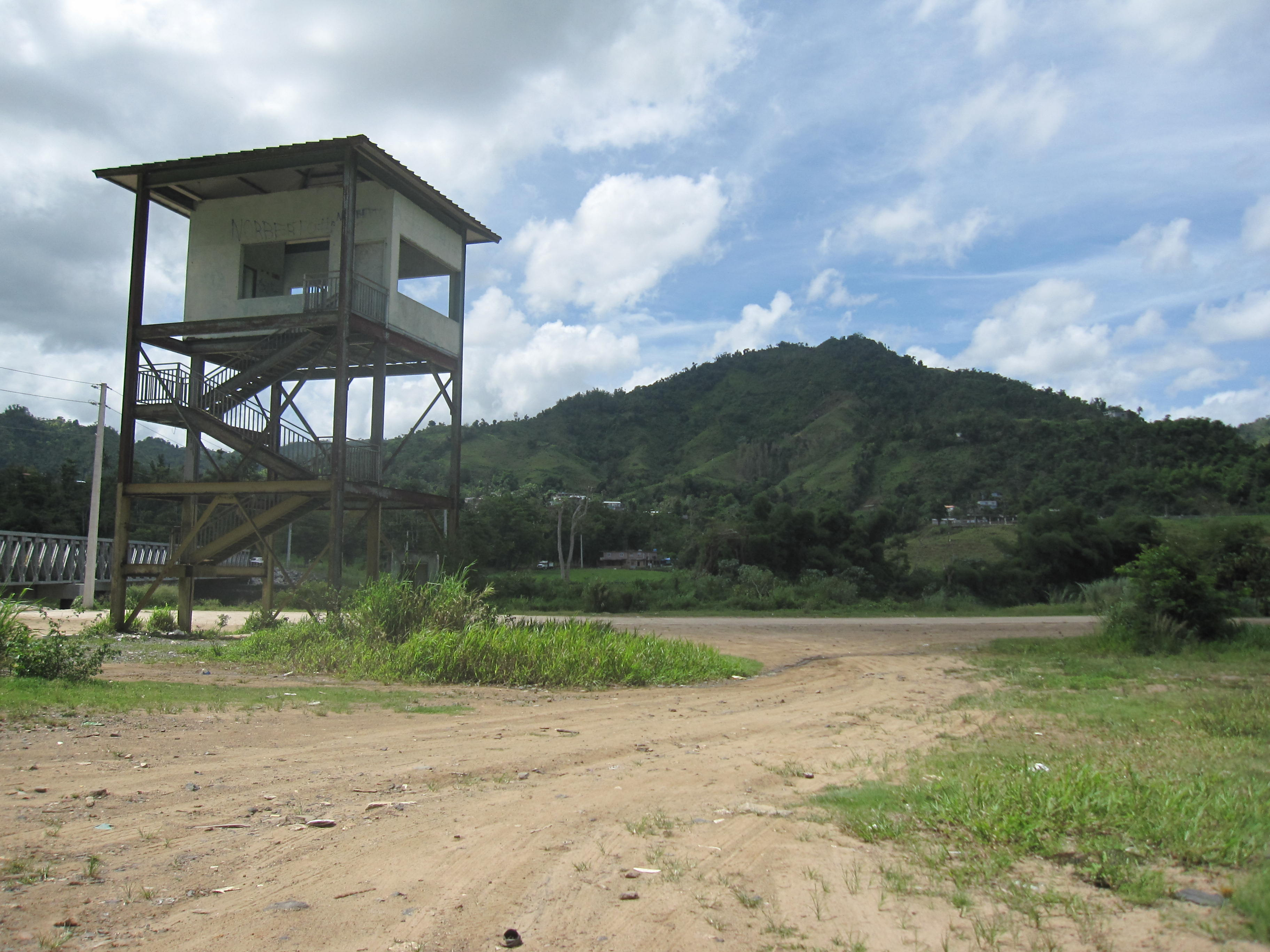
Racetrack in San Lorenzo where clandestine car races took place until July 18, 1998

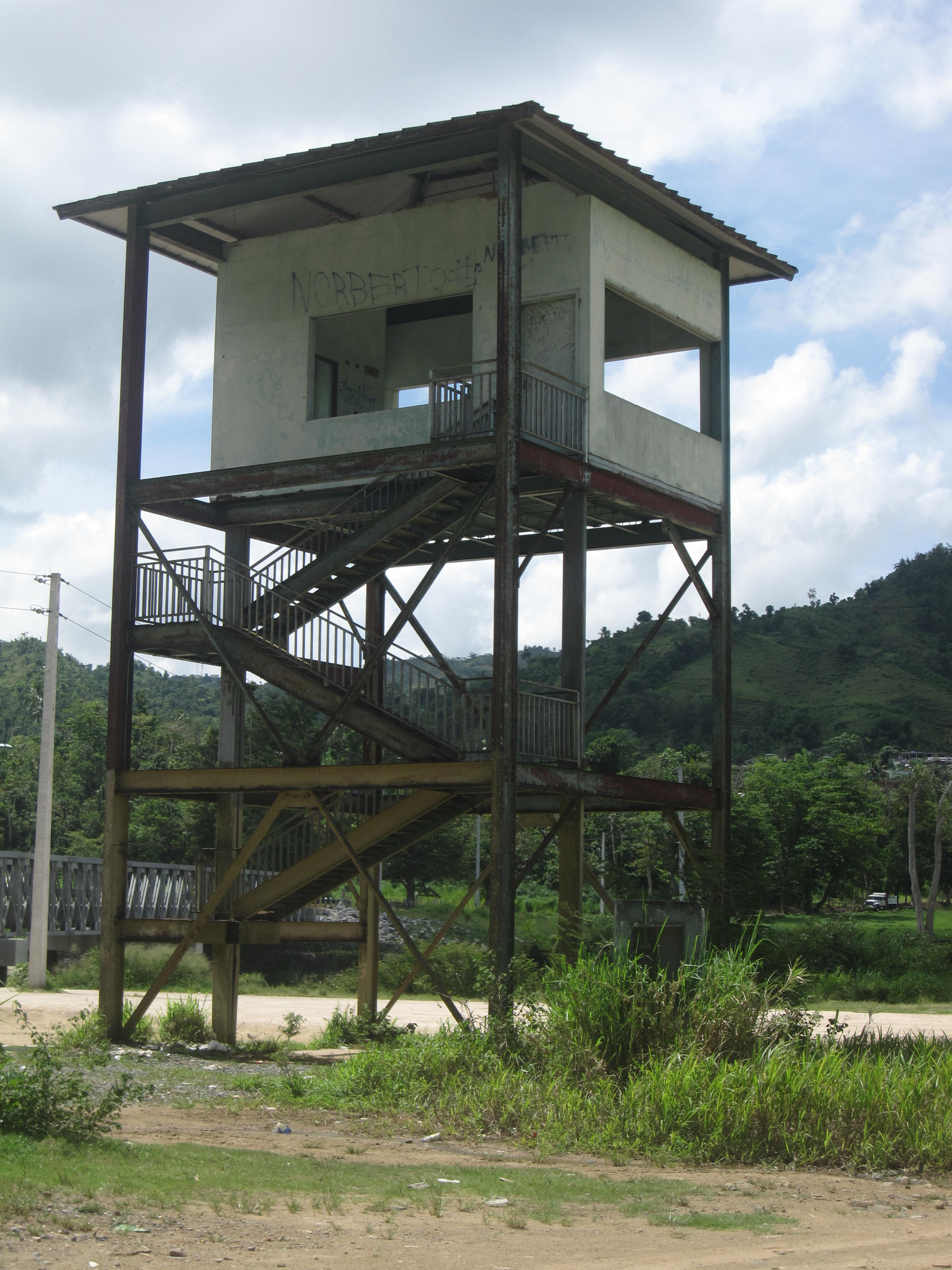
Old racetrack tower in San Lorenzo

== See also ==
- List of communities in Puerto Rico
