= Pasto, Morovis, Puerto Rico =

Barrio of Puerto Rico

Pasto
- Barrio
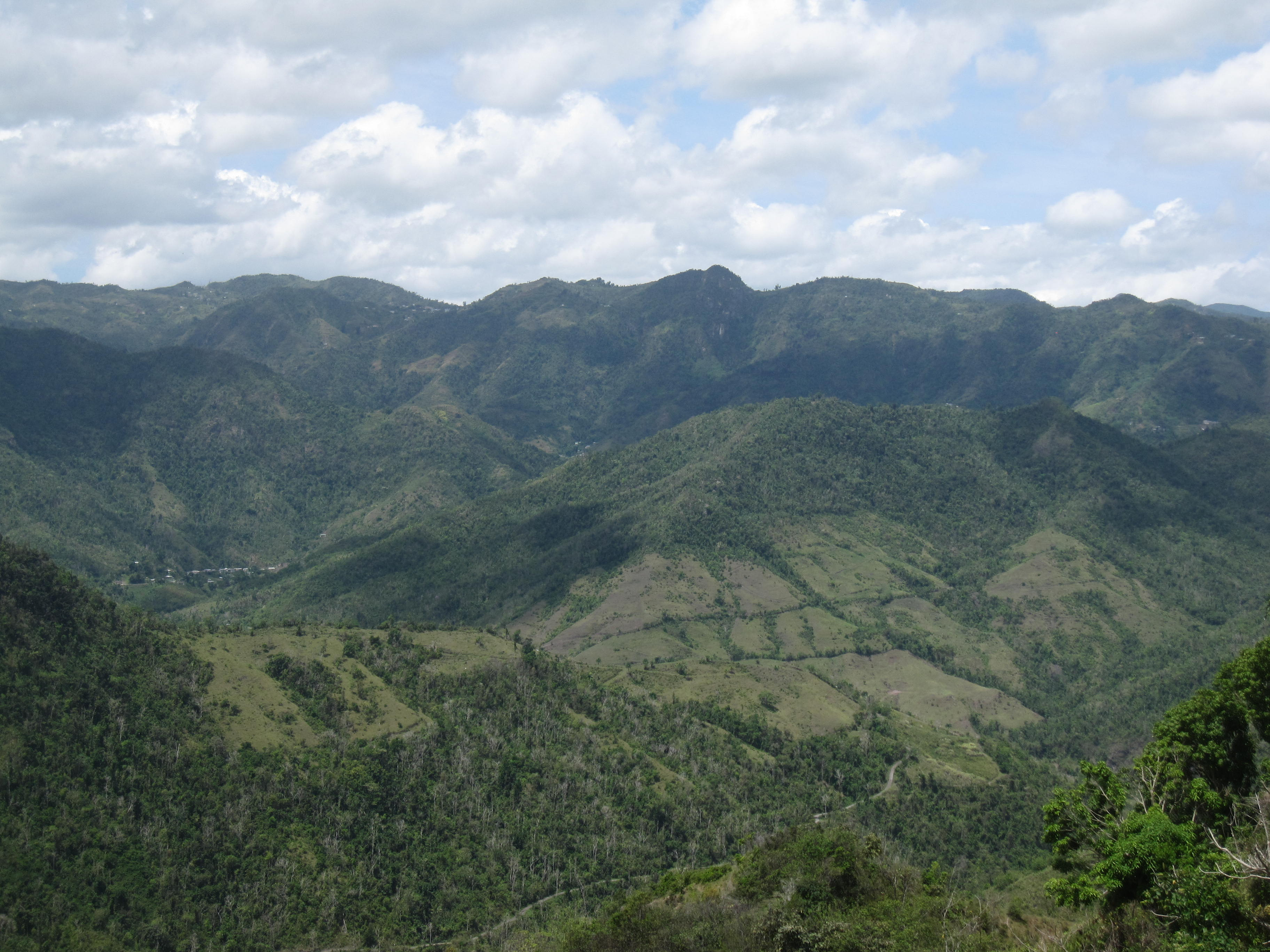
- View of Pasto

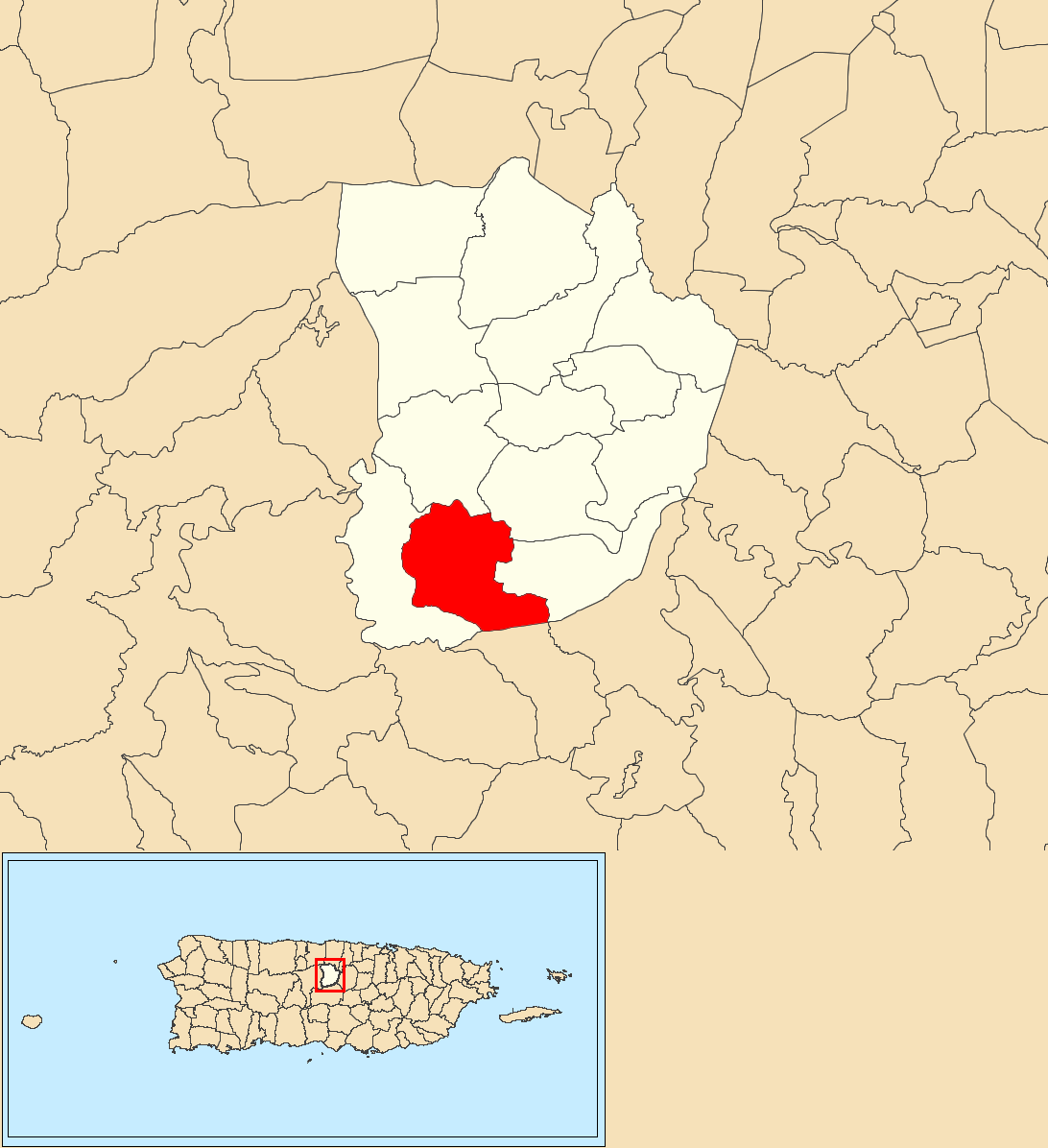
- Location of Pasto within the municipality of Morovis shown in red

- Location of Puerto Rico
- Coordinates: 18°16′29″N 66°26′03″W
- Commonwealth: Puerto Rico
- Municipality: Morovis

Area
  - Total: 3.14 sq mi (8.1 km^{2})
  - Land: 3.14 sq mi (8.1 km^{2})
  - Water: 0 sq mi (0 km^{2})
- Elevation: 1,171 ft (357 m)

Population (2010)
  - Total: 767
  - Density: 244.3/sq mi (94.3/km^{2})
- Source: 2010 Census
- Time zone: UTC−4 (AST)
- Zip code: 00687

Pasto is a barrio in the municipality of Morovis, Puerto Rico. Pasto has about 8 sectors and its population in 2010 was 767.

== Geography ==
Pasto is located in the southern part of Morovis, between Vaga and Perchas and to its north are San Lorenzo and Río Grande, all barrios of Morovis. The southern border of Pasto barrio is with the municipality of Orocovis.

== History ==
Morovis and its barrios were founded in 1818 by Juan Evangelista Rivera and Juan José de Torres.

Pasto was in Spain's gazetteers until Puerto Rico was ceded by Spain in the aftermath of the Spanish–American War under the terms of the Treaty of Paris of 1898 and became an unincorporated territory of the United States. In 1899, the United States Department of War conducted a census of Puerto Rico finding that the population of Pasto barrio was 1,314.

Historical population
Census	Pop.	Note	%±
1900	1,314		—
1910	1,137		−13.5%
1920	1,307		15.0%
1930	1,200		−8.2%
1940	1,245		3.8%
1950	823		−33.9%
1960	596		−27.6%
1970	622		4.4%
1980	704		13.2%
1990	730		3.7%
2000	777		6.4%
2010	767		−1.3%
U.S. Decennial Census; 1899 (shown as 1900) 1910-1930; 1930-1950 1980-2000 2010

On September 20, 2017 Hurricane Maria devastated the island of Puerto Rico. The landslides caused by Hurricane Maria's rains left Morovis cut off from its neighboring municipalities. In Pasto, a large boulder and landslide blocked entry into and out of the barrio, cutting it off from any outside help. Bridge access into San Lorenzo, a neighboring barrio was cut off as well.

== Sectors ==
Barrios (which are, in contemporary times, roughly comparable to minor civil divisions) in turn are further subdivided into smaller local populated place areas/units called sectores (sectors in English). The types of sectores may vary, from normally sector to urbanización to reparto to barriada to residencial, among others.

The following sectors are in Pasto barrio:

Sector Culebra, Sector Flamboyán, Sector Galán, Sector Limones, Sector Los Pérez, Sector Orquídeas, Sector Pasto, and Sector Trinchera.

== See also ==
- List of communities in Puerto Rico
