= Vaga, Morovis, Puerto Rico =

Barrio of Puerto Rico

Vaga
- Barrio
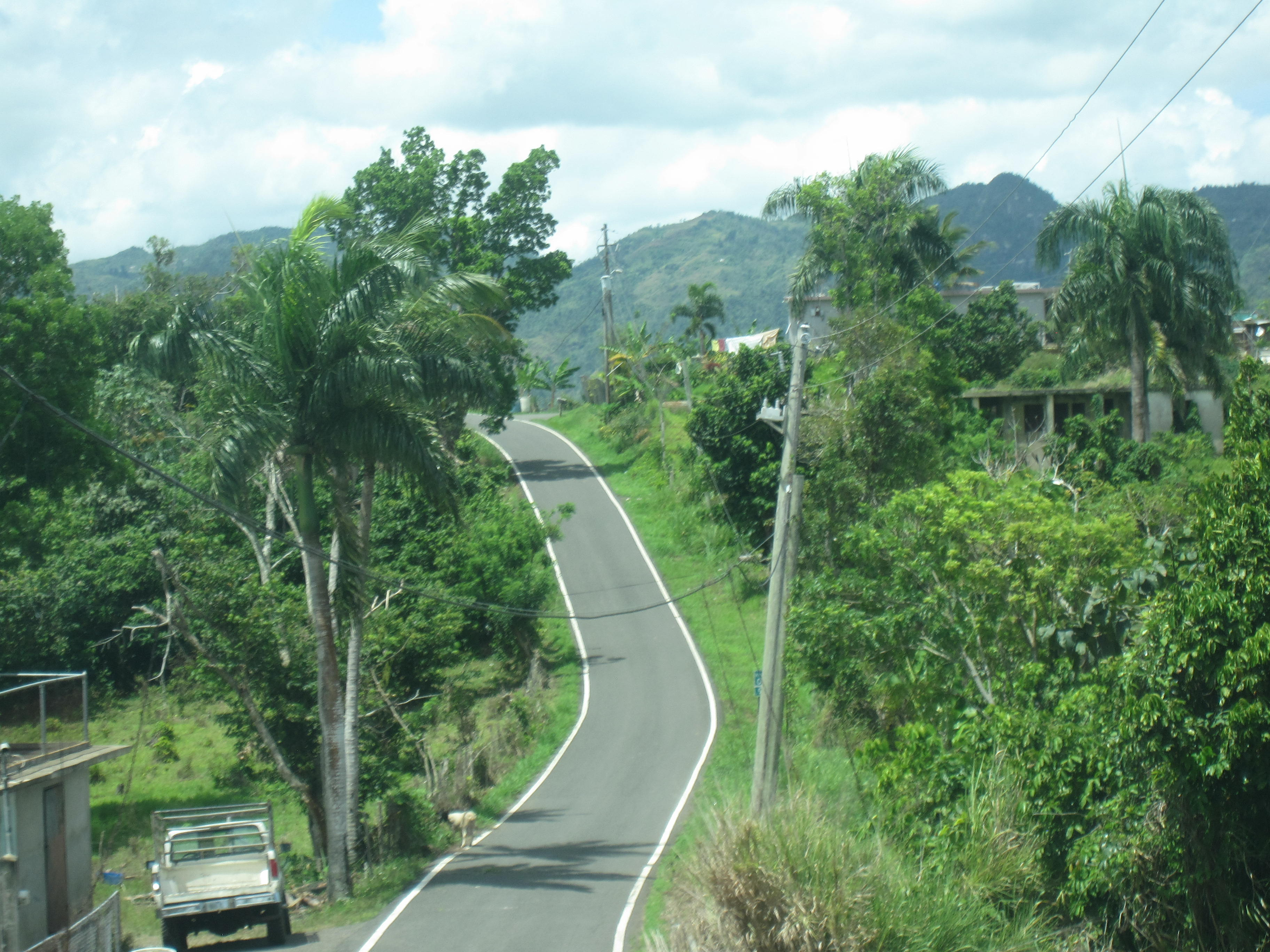
- View of Puerto Rico Highway 567 in Vaga

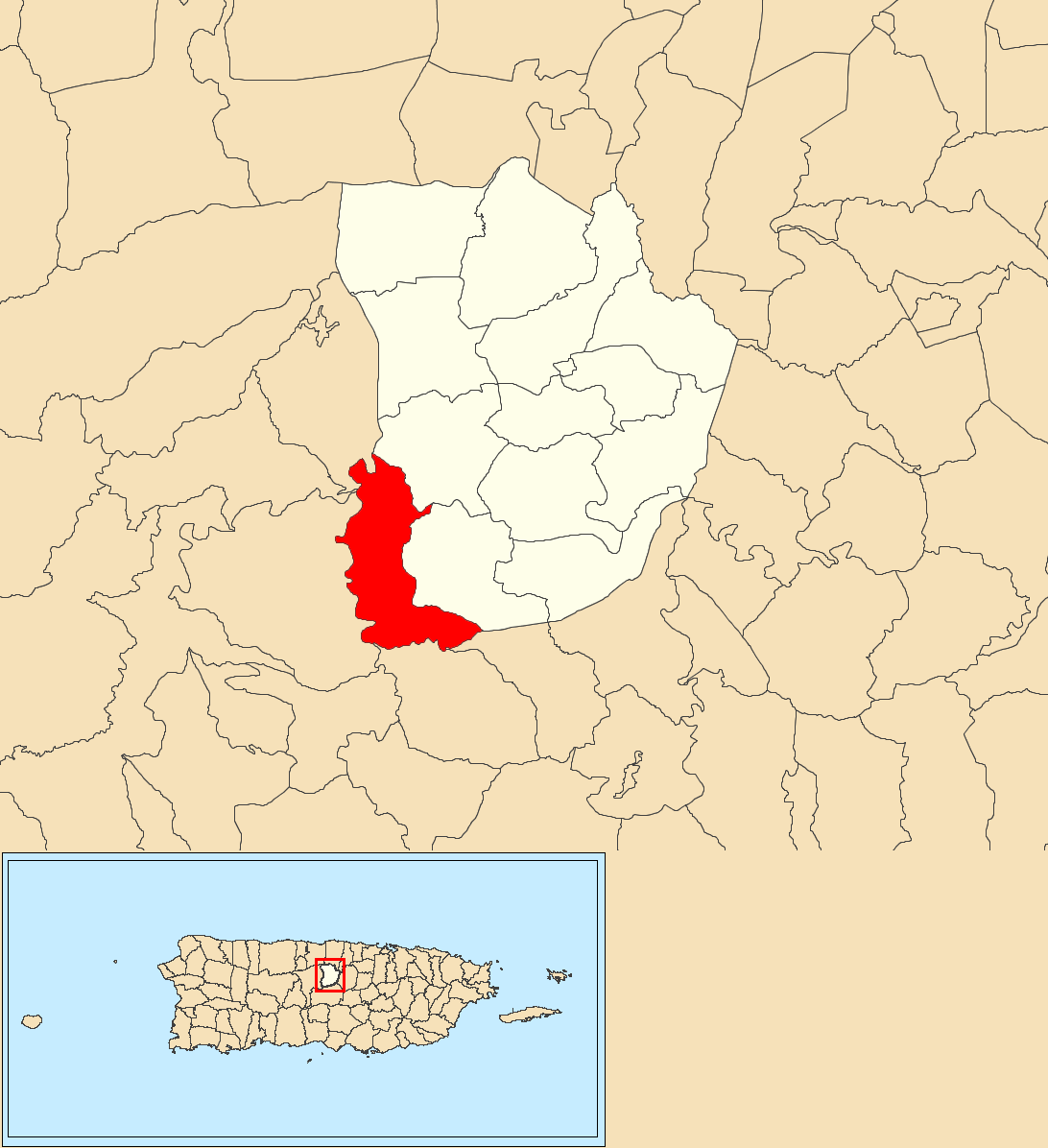
- Location of Vaga within the municipality of Morovis shown in red

- Location of Puerto Rico
- Coordinates: 18°16′37″N 66°27′03″W
- Commonwealth: Puerto Rico
- Municipality: Morovis

Area
  - Total: 3.38 sq mi (8.8 km^{2})
  - Land: 3.38 sq mi (8.8 km^{2})
  - Water: 0 sq mi (0 km^{2})
- Elevation: 1,339 ft (408 m)

Population (2010)
  - Total: 471
  - Density: 139.3/sq mi (53.8/km^{2})
- Source: 2010 Census
- Time zone: UTC−4 (AST)
- Zip code: 00687

Vaga is a barrio in the municipality of Morovis, Puerto Rico. Vaga has three sectors and its population in 2010 was 471.

== History ==
Vaga was in Spain's gazetteers until Puerto Rico was ceded by Spain in the aftermath of the Spanish–American War under the terms of the Treaty of Paris of 1898 and became an unincorporated territory of the United States. In 1899, the United States Department of War conducted a census of Puerto Rico finding that the population of Vaga barrio was 828.

Historical population
Census	Pop.	Note	%±
1900	828		—
1910	786		−5.1%
1920	900		14.5%
1930	865		−3.9%
1940	940		8.7%
1950	1,043		11.0%
1960	646		−38.1%
1970	656		1.5%
1980	721		9.9%
1990	433		−39.9%
2000	648		49.7%
2010	471		−27.3%
U.S. Decennial Census; 1899 (shown as 1900) 1910-1930; 1930-1950 1980-2000 2010

== Geography ==
Vaga is located on the southwestern corner of the municipality of Morovis. It is south of San Lorenzo barrio and west of Pasto barrio. Vaga's western border is with the municipality of Ciales.

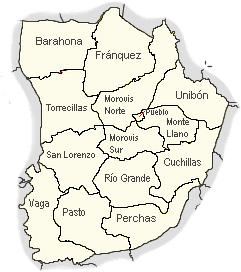
Barrios of Morovis

== Sectors ==
Barrios (which are, in contemporary times, roughly comparable to minor civil divisions) in turn are further subdivided into smaller local populated place areas/units called sectores (sectors in English). The types of sectores may vary, from normally sector to urbanización to reparto to barriada to residencial, among others.

The following sectors are in Vaga barrio:

Sector Vaga, Sector Vaga 1, and Sector Vaga 3.

== See also ==
- List of communities in Puerto Rico
