= Morovis, Puerto Rico =

Town and municipality in Puerto Rico

Morovis Municipio Autónomo de Morovis
- Town and Municipality
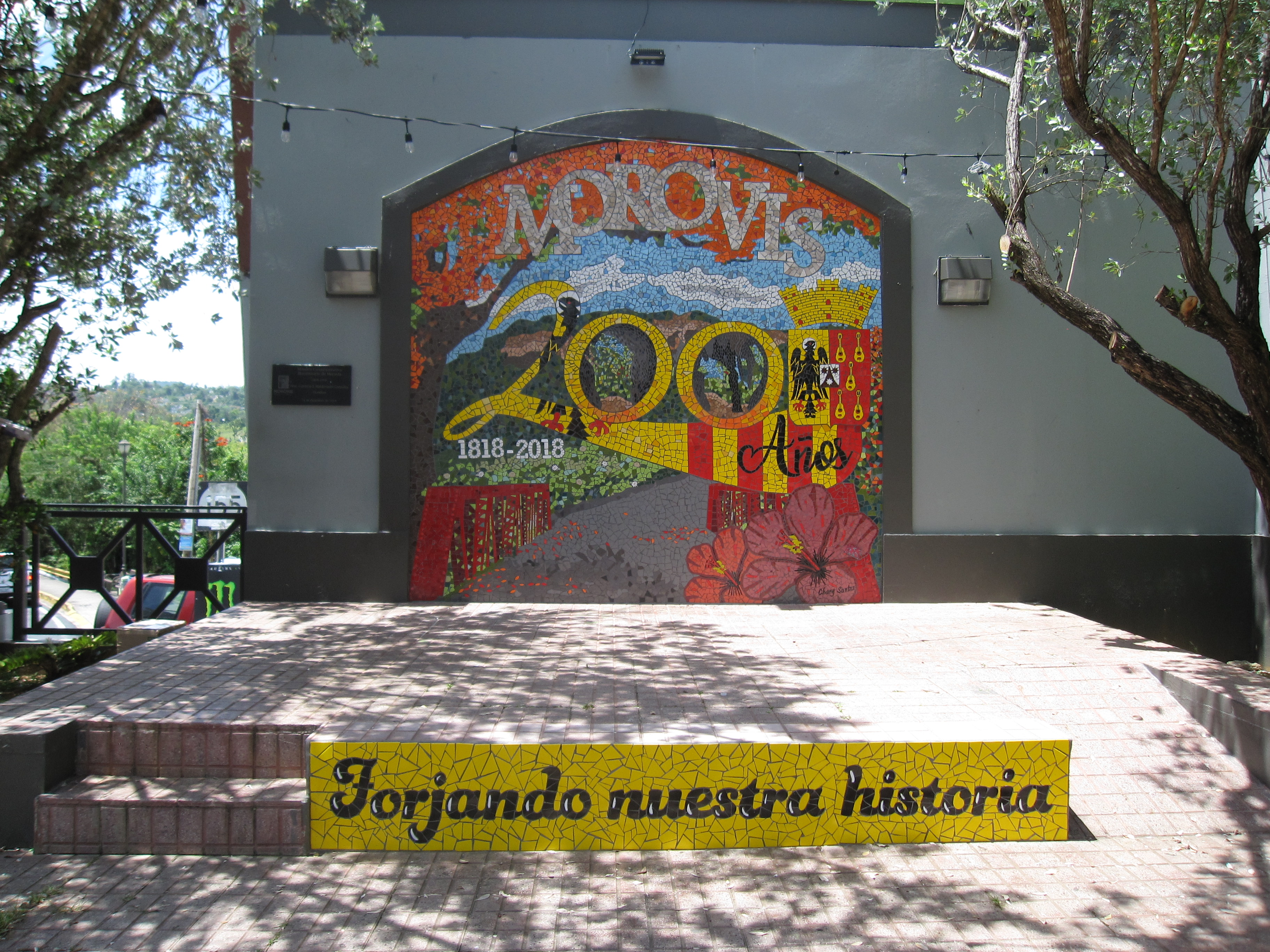
- Small plaza in Morovis barrio-pueblo

- Flag Coat of arms
- Nickname: "La Isla Menos Morovis" ("The island but Morovis")
- Anthem: "Oh Morovis, tu vives latente"
- Map of Puerto Rico highlighting Morovis Municipality
- Coordinates: 18°20′00″N 66°25′00″W
- Sovereign state: United States
- Commonwealth: Puerto Rico
- Settled: 1815
- Founded: January 24, 1818
- Founder: Don Juan José de la Torre
- Barrios: 14 barrios: Barahona; Cuchillas; Fránquez; Monte Llano; Morovis barrio-pueblo; Morovis Norte; Morovis Sud; Pasto; Perchas; Río Grande; San Lorenzo; Torrecillas; Unibón; Vaga

Government
  - Mayor: Carmen Maldonado González (PPD)
  - Senatorial dist.: 3 - Arecibo
  - Representative dist.: 28

Area
  - Total: 38.7 sq mi (100.3 km^{2})
- Elevation: 1,230 ft (375 m)

Population (2020)
  - Total: 28,727
  - Estimate (2025): 28,170 ▼
  - Rank: 43rd in Puerto Rico
  - Density: 741.8/sq mi (286.4/km^{2})
- Demonym: Moroveños
- Time zone: UTC−4 (AST)
- ZIP Code: 00687
- Area code: 787/939

Morovis (Spanish pronunciation: [moˈɾoβis], locally [moˈɾoβiʔ]) is a town and municipality of Puerto Rico located in the central region of the island, north of Orocovis, south of Manatí, Vega Baja and Vega Alta; east of Ciales, and west of Corozal. Morovis is spread over 13 barrios and Morovis Pueblo (the downtown area and the administrative center of the city). It is part of the San Juan-Caguas-Guaynabo Metropolitan Statistical Area.

== History ==
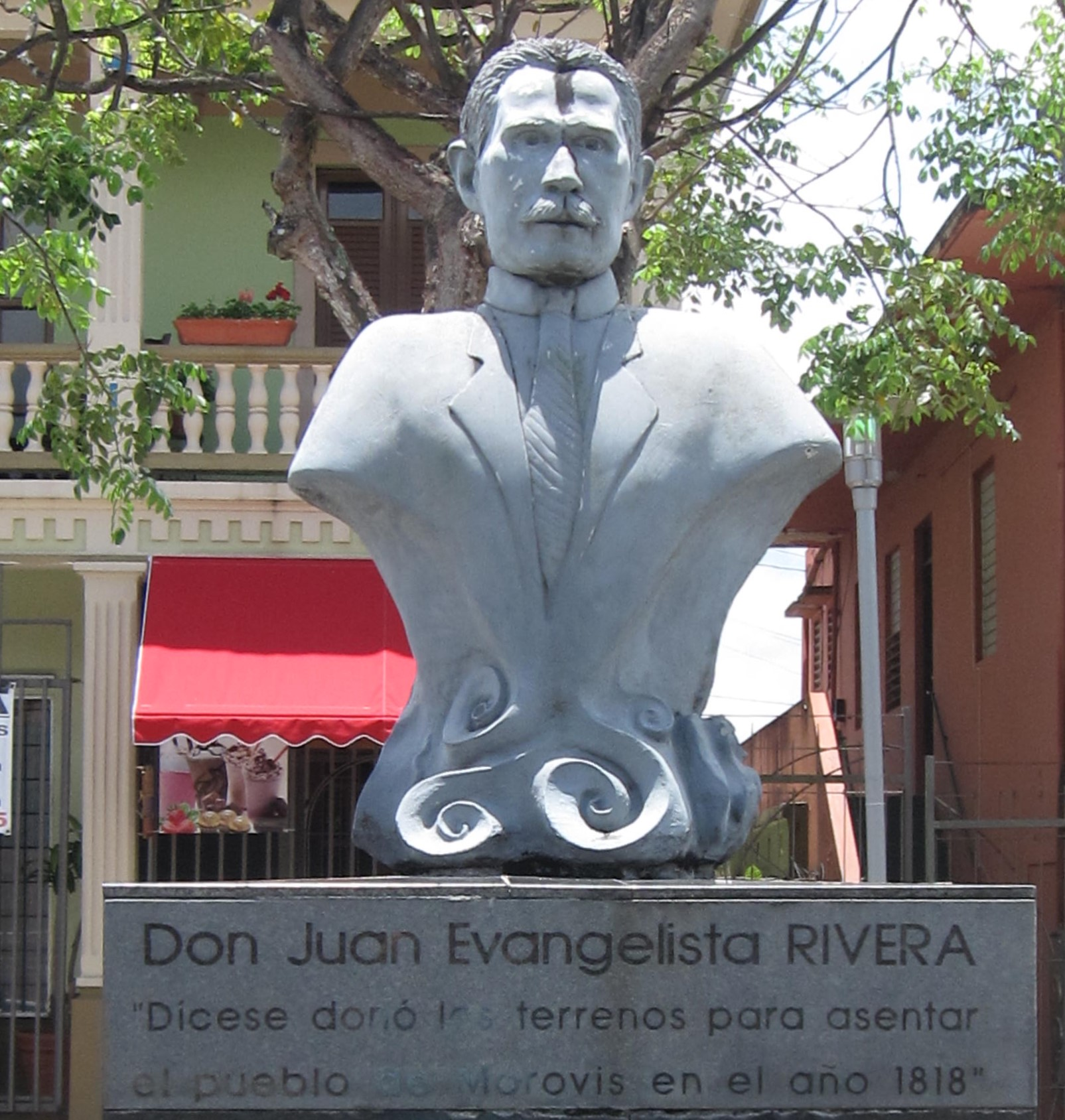
Don Juan Evangelista Rivera bust in Morovis barrio-pueblo

In 1815, a group of residents, under the leadership of Don Juan José de la Torre, began the process to separate Morovis from Manatí. In 1817, the government of Puerto Rico approved the separation, but it was not until 1818 that the requirements of a population of one thousand residents and the construction of a church and several other public buildings was fulfilled, that the municipality of Morovis was officially founded. In 1822, the mayorship was constructed and in 1823, the new church was built, dedicated to Nuestra Señora del Carmen on lands donated by Don Juan Evangelista Rivera. Its first mayor was Don Juan José de la Torre, with its second mayor being Don Juan Evangelista Rivera. Morovis has a particular nickname. It was the only municipality in Puerto Rico that did not suffer from a cholera epidemic in 1853; as a result, a common phrase, "la isla menos Morovis" ("(all of) the island but Morovis") was coined. The phrase is believed by Puerto Ricans from outside of the town to have a negative connotation against moroveños, while, in reality, it is considered a positive motto.

In 1875, Abino Casellas was mayor of Morovis and in 1879, Cruz Maria Castro was mayor.

Puerto Rico was ceded by Spain in the aftermath of the Spanish–American War under the terms of the Treaty of Paris of 1898 and became a territory of the United States. In 1899, the United States Department of War conducted a census of Puerto Rico finding that the population of Morovis was 11,309.

Morovis is a mountainous municipality with an area of approximately 100.3 square kilometres (38.7 sq mi), located slightly north of the center of the island, which was hit particularly hard by Hurricane Maria on September 20, 2017. With a 2016 estimate of 31,603 residents at the time, 1500 to 2000 homes lost their roof and 500 wooden homes were completed destroyed. Roads and bridges were impacted by landslides and flooding, and residents were left without access to electrical power, telecommunication services and basic necessities for many months.

The community in San Lorenzo, a barrio of Morovis with about 1,000 people, was left isolated when the bridge into the barrio was washed away by the Morovis River.

Then mayor of Morovis, Carmen Maldonado delivered food to residents, the municipal town hall became a food distribution center and she arranged for the purchase and delivery of a water truck to provide clean water daily to the residents who did not have access to clean water.

Maldonado spoke to New York governor Andrew Cuomo, requesting his help and Cuomo responded by contacting H.e.a.r.t. 9/11, a non-profit organization. In early 2019, Maldonado received and thanked volunteers from H.e.a.r.t. 9/11, mostly carpenters who came to Morovis to repair and rebuild homes damaged by the hurricane. In late 2019, H.e.a.r.t. 9/11 was still rebuilding roofs in Morovis.

== Geography ==
The municipality of Morovis is located in the northern mountainous central quadrant of Puerto Rico, bound by the Northern Karst Belt in the north and the Cordillera Central in the south. The highest point of the municipality of Morovis is Cerro El Malo, at 2,262.6 feet (690 m) of elevation, on the municipal boundary with Orocovis.

=== Barrios ===
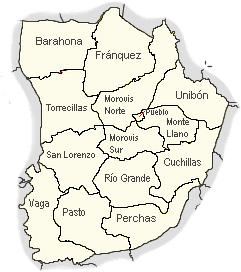
Barrios of Morovis.

Like all municipalities of Puerto Rico, Morovis is subdivided into barrios. The municipal buildings, central square and large Catholic church are located near the center of the municipality, in a small barrio referred to as "Pueblo".

1. Barahona
2. Cuchillas
3. Fránquez
4. Monte Llano
5. Morovis barrio-pueblo
6. Morovis Norte
7. Morovis Sud
8. Pasto
9. Perchas
10. Río Grande
11. San Lorenzo
12. Torrecillas
13. Unibón
14. Vaga

=== Sectors ===
Barrios (which are like minor civil divisions) are further subdivided into smaller areas called sectores (sectors in English). The types of sectores may vary, from normally sector to urbanización to reparto to barriada to residencial, among others.

=== Special Communities ===
Comunidades Especiales de Puerto Rico (Special Communities of Puerto Rico) are marginalized communities whose citizens are experiencing social exclusion. A map shows these communities occur in nearly every municipality of the commonwealth. Of the 742 places that were on the list in 2014, the following entire barrios, communities, sectors, or neighborhoods were in Morovis: Barrio Vaga, Santo Domingo-Pellejas, Ensanche, Parcelas Cuchillas, Comunidad José Otero Claverol, Parcelas San Lorenzo, Parcelas Torrecillas, Patrón, Sector Invasiones de Torrecillas, Sector Jobos, Sector Riachuelo, Sector Rosado, Barrio Unibón, Sector Vietnam, and Villa Roca.

== Morovis National (Veterans) Cemetery ==
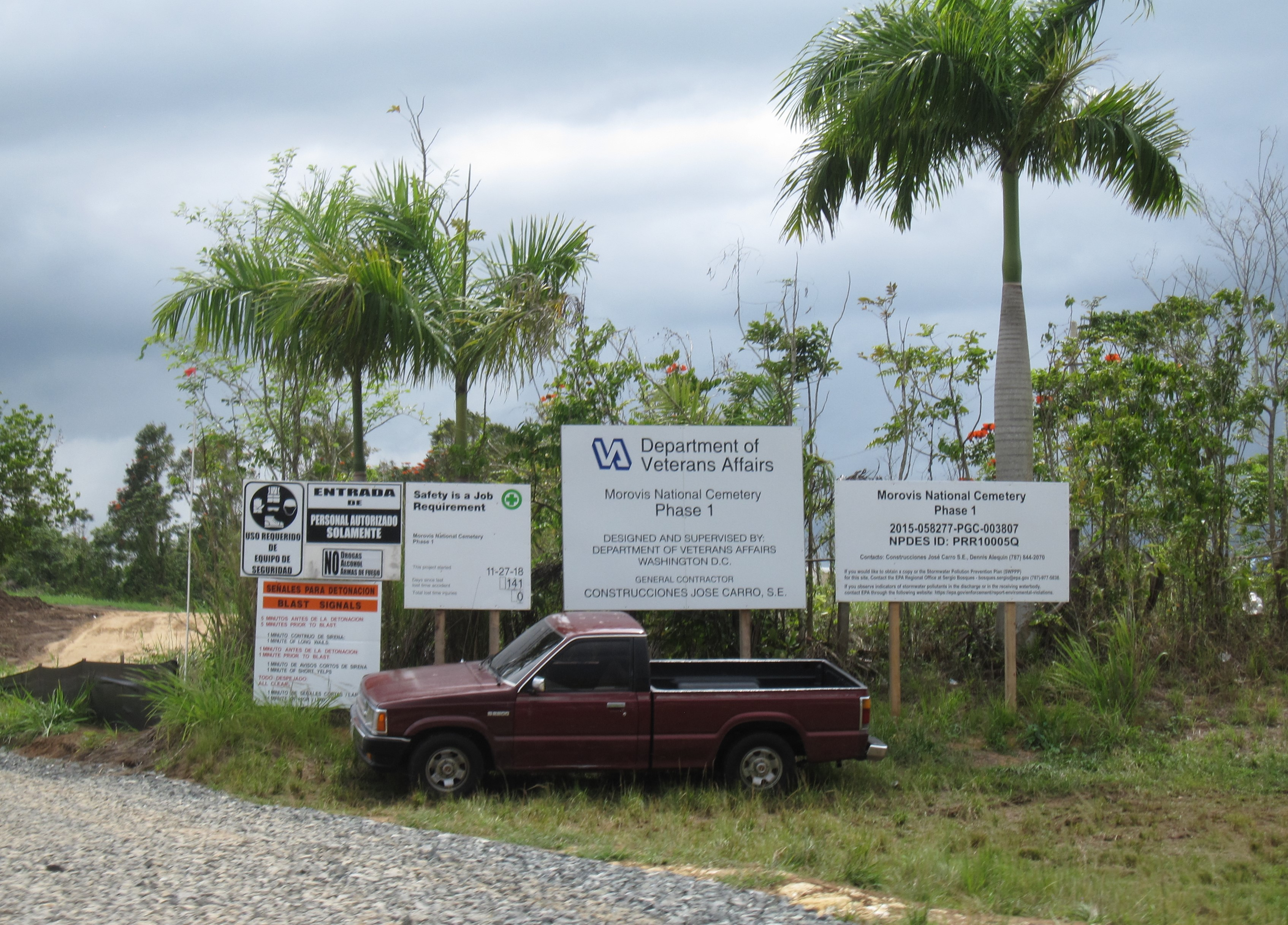
Morovis National Cemetery, construction Phase I

The Morovis National Cemetery, a US veterans cemetery, was built in Morovis within a 247.5-acre parcel of land that can be accessed from Highway 137 at Km. 11.2. It was built to replace the existing Puerto Rico National Cemetery located in Bayamón which reached capacity. Construction was underway in 2019 with interments slated to begin in 2021.

== Economy ==
An Energy Consortium was signed in late February 2019 by the mayors of Villalba, Orocovis, Morovis, Ciales and Barranquitas municipalities. The consortium is the first of its kind for Puerto Rico. It is intended to have those municipalities work together to safeguard and create resilient, and efficient energy networks, with backups for their communities. This is part of the hurricane preparedness plan of these municipalities, which were hit particularly hard by Hurricane Maria on September 20, 2017.

== Tourism ==
=== Landmarks and places of interest ===
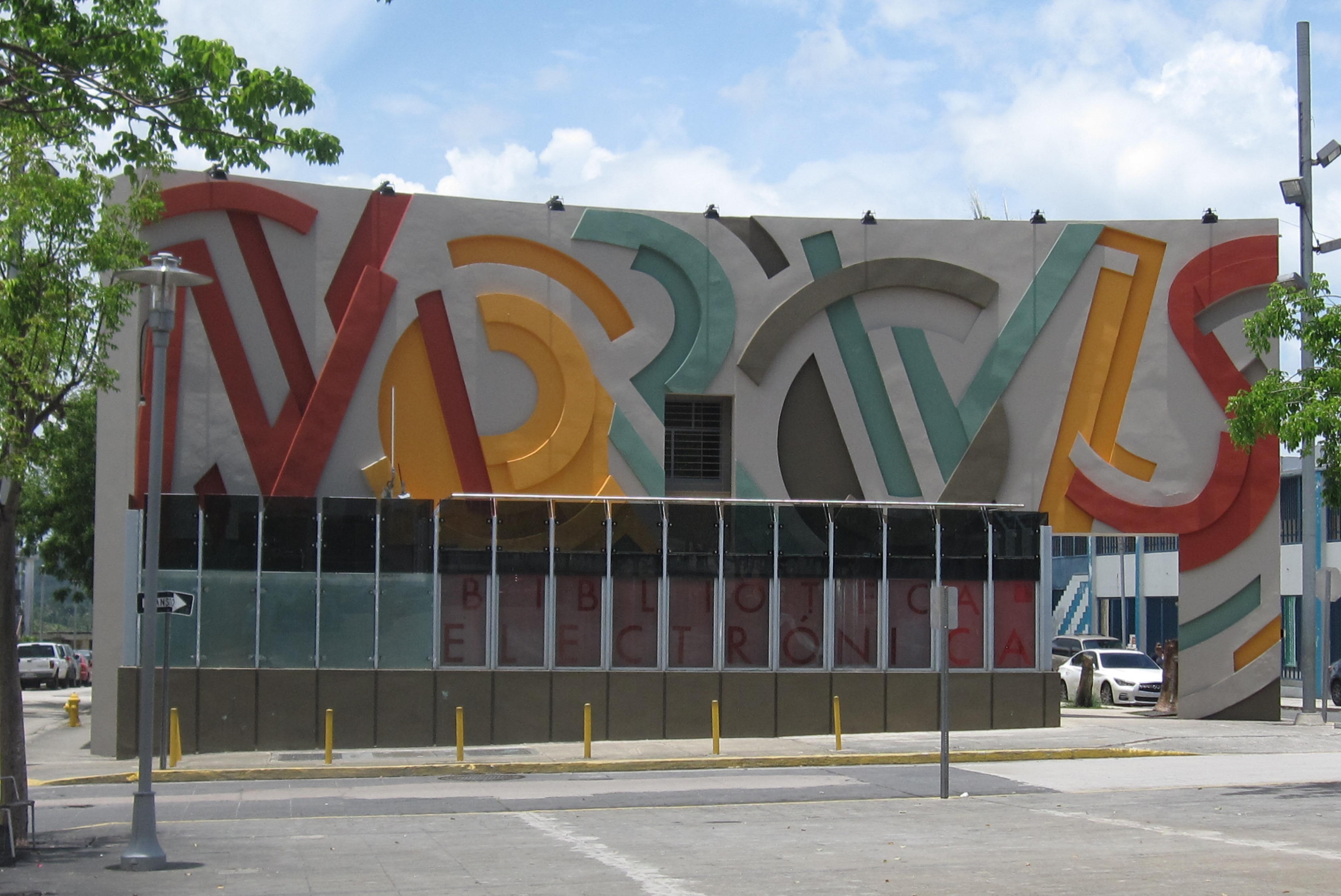
Biblioteca Electrónica Julia M. Chéverez Marrero in the recreational plaza in Morovis Pueblo

A well-known landmark in Morovis is The Red Bridge (Puente Colorao). It's an iron bridge which was built in 1912 and is located on PR-155 in barrio Morovis Norte. Cuevas Las Cabachuelas (Cabachuelas Caves) is a cave system in Puerto Rico which opened for tourism in 2019. It is located between the municipalities of Morovis and Ciales, Puerto Rico in the Cabachuelas Natural Reserve, established in 2012 and is of cultural, archaeological, hydrological and geomorphological importance to Puerto Rico. Guided tours are offered by the Diógenes Colón Gómez Cultural Center in Morovis, by reservation only.

La Patria Bakery, home of the Pan de La Patita Echa', is a bakery established in 1862 in Morovis, that uses a brick oven for making bread. The bread has a curious name and look, resembling crossed legs.

The Julia M. Cheverez Electronic Library is located in the main square in Morovis barrio-pueblo also referred to as the pueblo.

Each barrio had a mural painted by a group of local artists and ValorArte and the mural images depict values such as honor, peace, responsibility, leadership and culture.

=== Bavarian cuisine ===
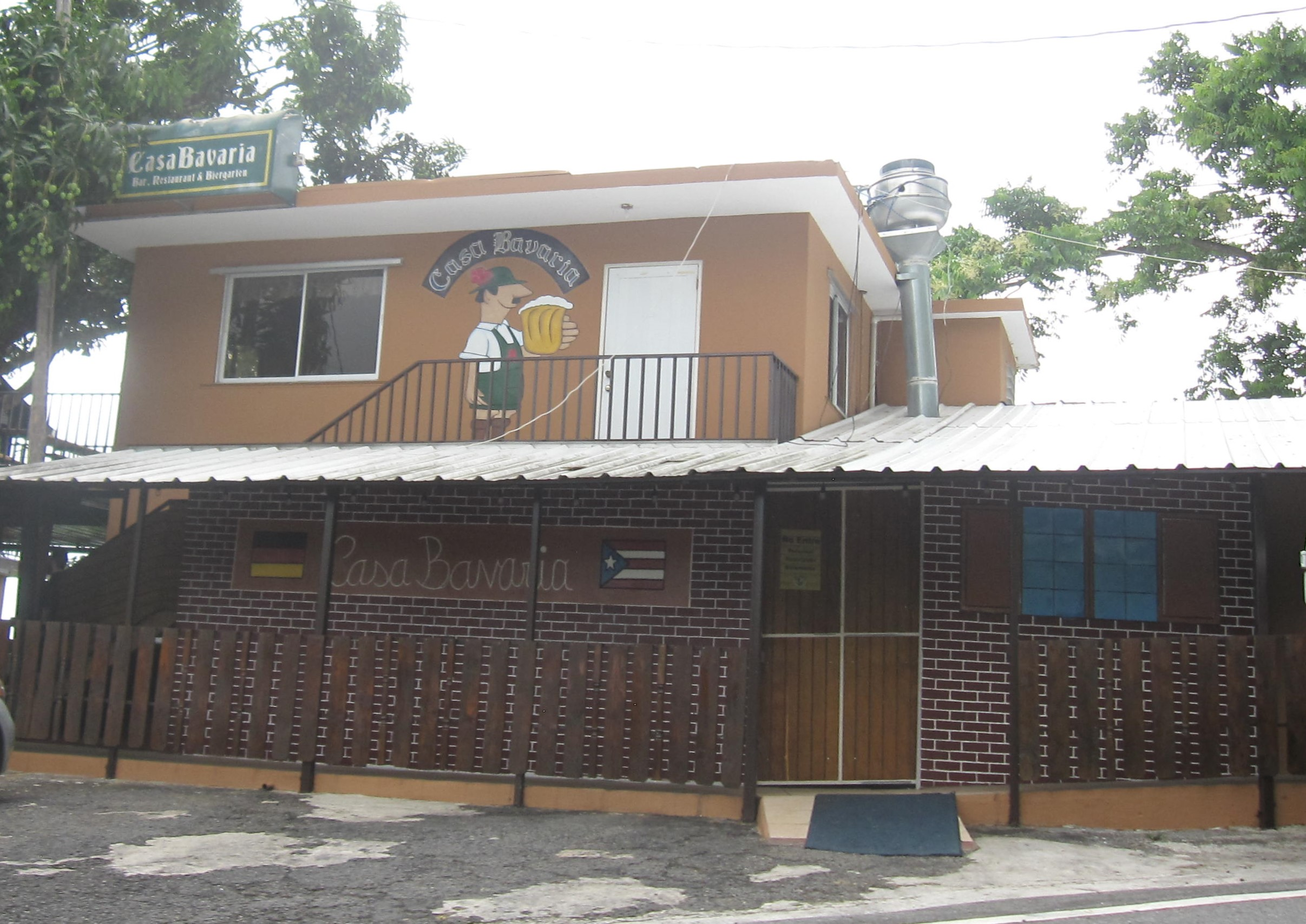
Casa Bavaria, a Bavarian restaurant on PR-155 in Morovis

Casa Bavaria restaurant, located in the Cordillera Central (central mountain range) in Morovis, has become a gathering place for locals, and tourists, and was visited in 2009 by former US President Bill Clinton.

== Culture ==
=== Festivals and events ===
Morovis' patron saint festival takes place in July. The Fiestas Patronales de Nuestra Señora del Carmen, celebrated in honor of Our Lady of Mount Carmel, is a religious and cultural celebration that generally features parades, games, artisans, amusement rides, regional food, and live entertainment.

Other festivals and events include:

- Tribute to Don Felo - May
- Maratón del jíbaro (transl. The Peasant's Marathon) - June
- The Puerto Rican cuatro Festival - July
- The Island Except Morovis - December
- Massacre of the Innocents day - December 28

== Demographics ==
Historical population
Census	Pop.	Note	%±
1900	11,309		—
1910	12,446		10.1%
1920	14,660		17.8%
1930	17,332		18.2%
1940	19,167		10.6%
1950	19,291		0.6%
1960	18,094		−6.2%
1970	19,059		5.3%
1980	21,142		10.9%
1990	25,288		19.6%
2000	29,965		18.5%
2010	32,610		8.8%
2020	28,727		−11.9%
2025 (est.)	28,170	▼	−1.9%
U.S. Decennial Census; 1899 (shown as 1900) 1910-1930; 1930-1950 1960-2000 2010 2020

Race - Morovis, Puerto Rico - 2000 Census
Race	Population	% of Total
White	27,917	93.2%
Black/African American	894	3.0%
American Indian and Alaska Native	61	0.2%
Asian	21	0.1%
Native Hawaiian/Pacific Islander	0	0%
Some other race	643	2.1%
Two or more races	422	1.4%

== Government ==
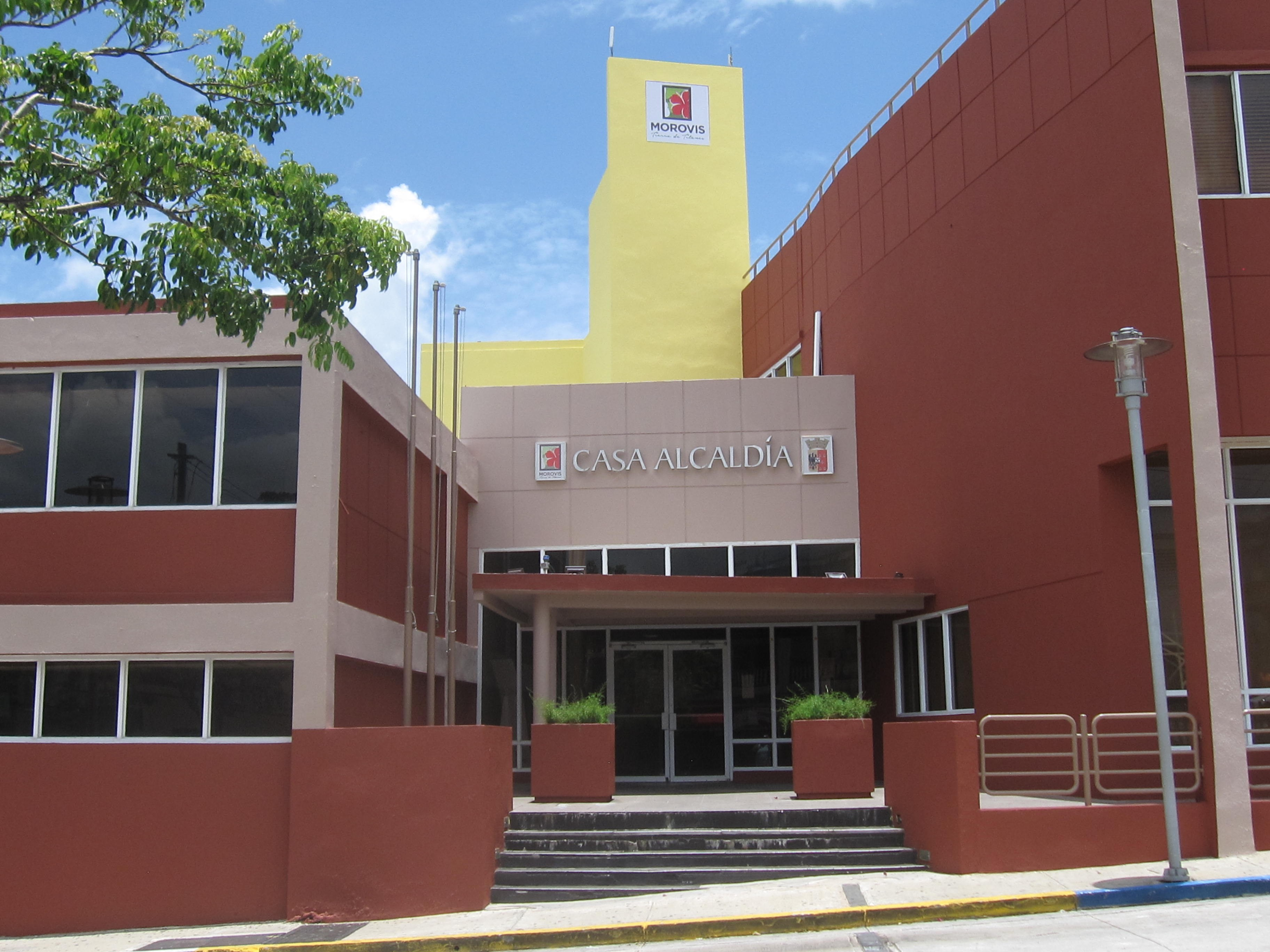
Town Hall in Morovis barrio-pueblo

All municipalities in Puerto Rico are administered by a mayor, elected every four years. The current mayor of Morovis is Carmen Maldonado González, of the Popular Democratic Party (PPD). She was first elected at the 2016 general elections.

The city belongs to the Puerto Rico Senatorial district III, which is represented by two Senators. In 2024, Brenda Pérez Soto and Gabriel Gonzáles were elected as District Senators.

== Transportation ==
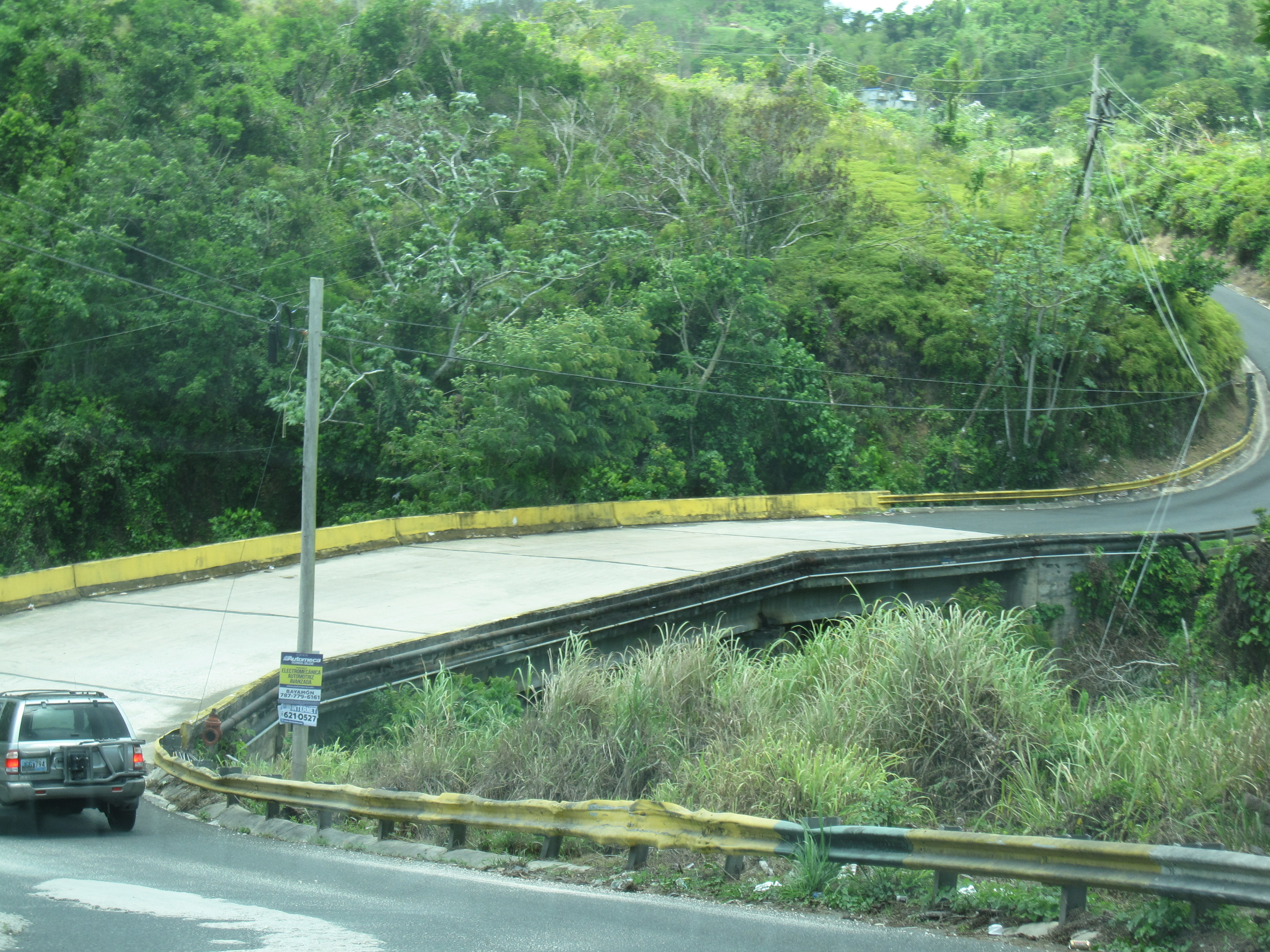
Bridge in Unibón barrio

There are 15 bridges in Morovis. Major routes that go through Morovis include PR-137, PR-145, PR-155, PR-159, and PR-160.

== Symbols ==
The municipio has an official flag and coat of arms.

=== Flag ===
The flag of Morovis is divided vertically in two equal parts. The immediate one to the mast is yellow and has the eagle of the coat of arms, in this case with the head facing left, toward the flagpole. The other half is divided in seven vertical stripes of equal width, four red ones alternated with three yellow ones.

=== Coat of arms ===
. The coat of arms of the Municipality of Morovis is formed by an eagle in the left partition, which symbolizes Saint John the Evangelist and sings in honor of the founder of the town, Don Juan Evangelista Rivera. The five cuatros observable in the right partition symbolize the fact that the town of Morovis is the main center of production of such typical Puerto Rican musical instruments. The shield in the center represents the Order of the Carmelite Nuns, and symbolizes as well the Our Lady of the Carmen, matron of the town. The left half is a field of yellow color (yellow for gold) in which resides a saber (black) eagle, beak and claws in red, its head enclosed with a halo.

== Notable moroveños ==
- Wesley Correa, basketball player, played for the local team 16 years
- Iluminado Davila Medina, cuatro musician

== Gallery ==
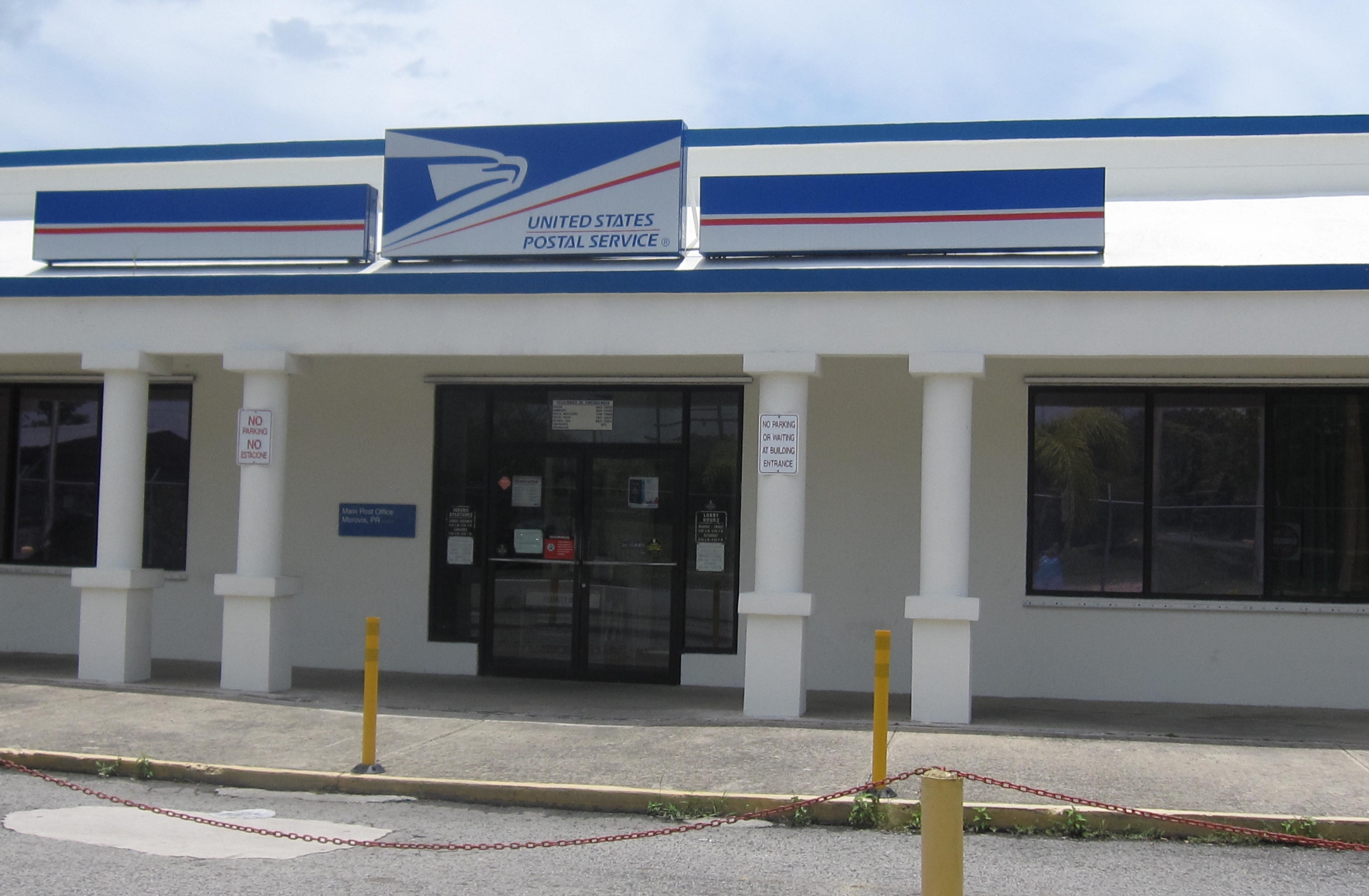
USPS in Morovis

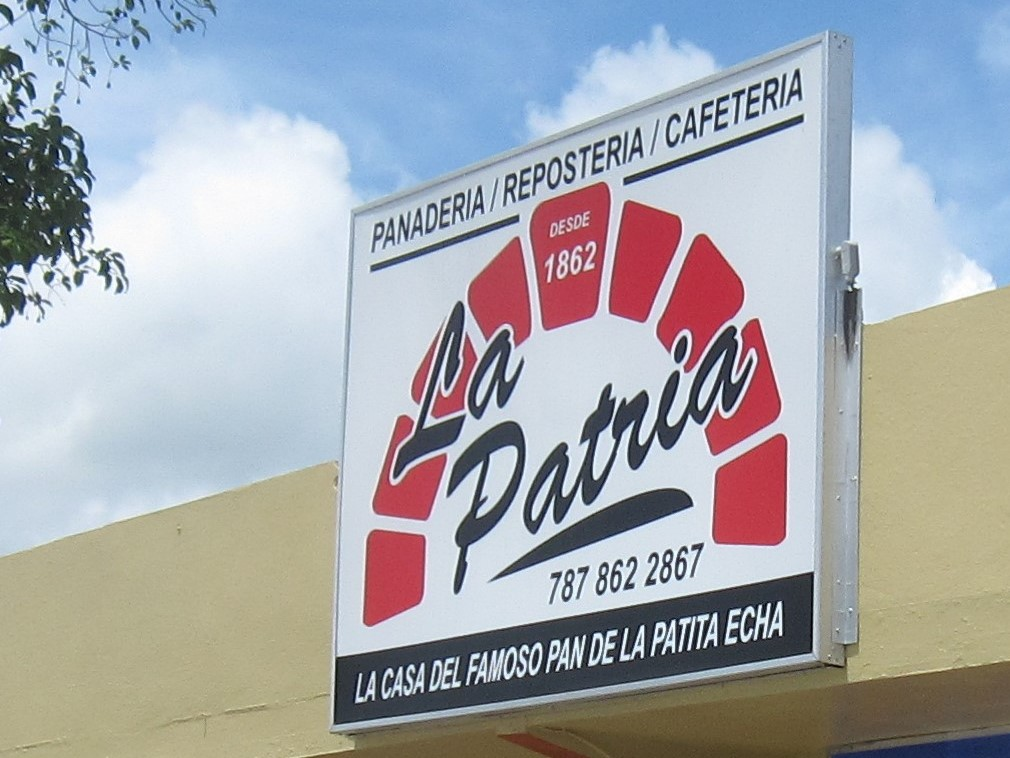
La Patria, bakery established in 1862

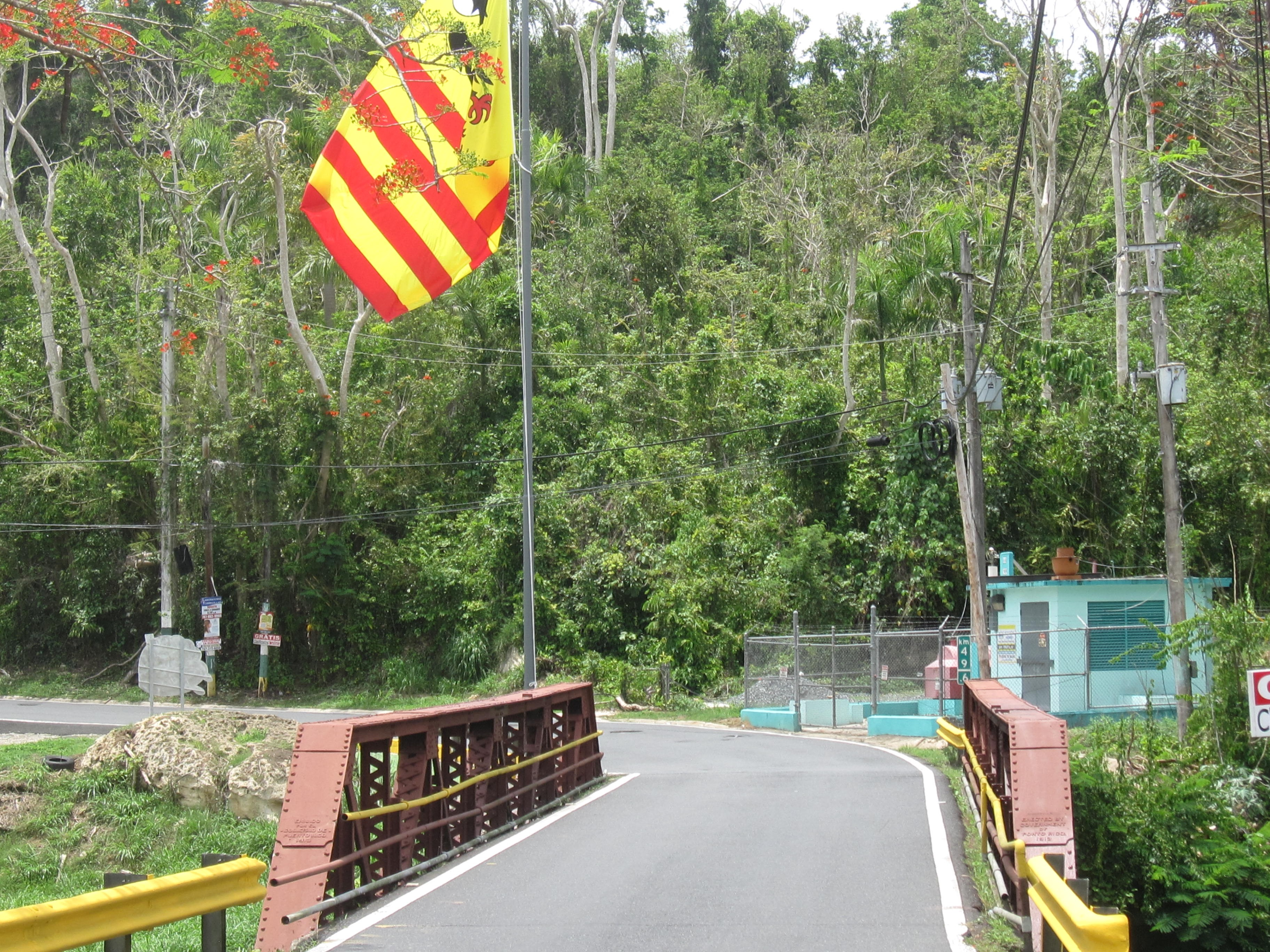
Red Bridge (Puente Colorao) in Morovis Norte

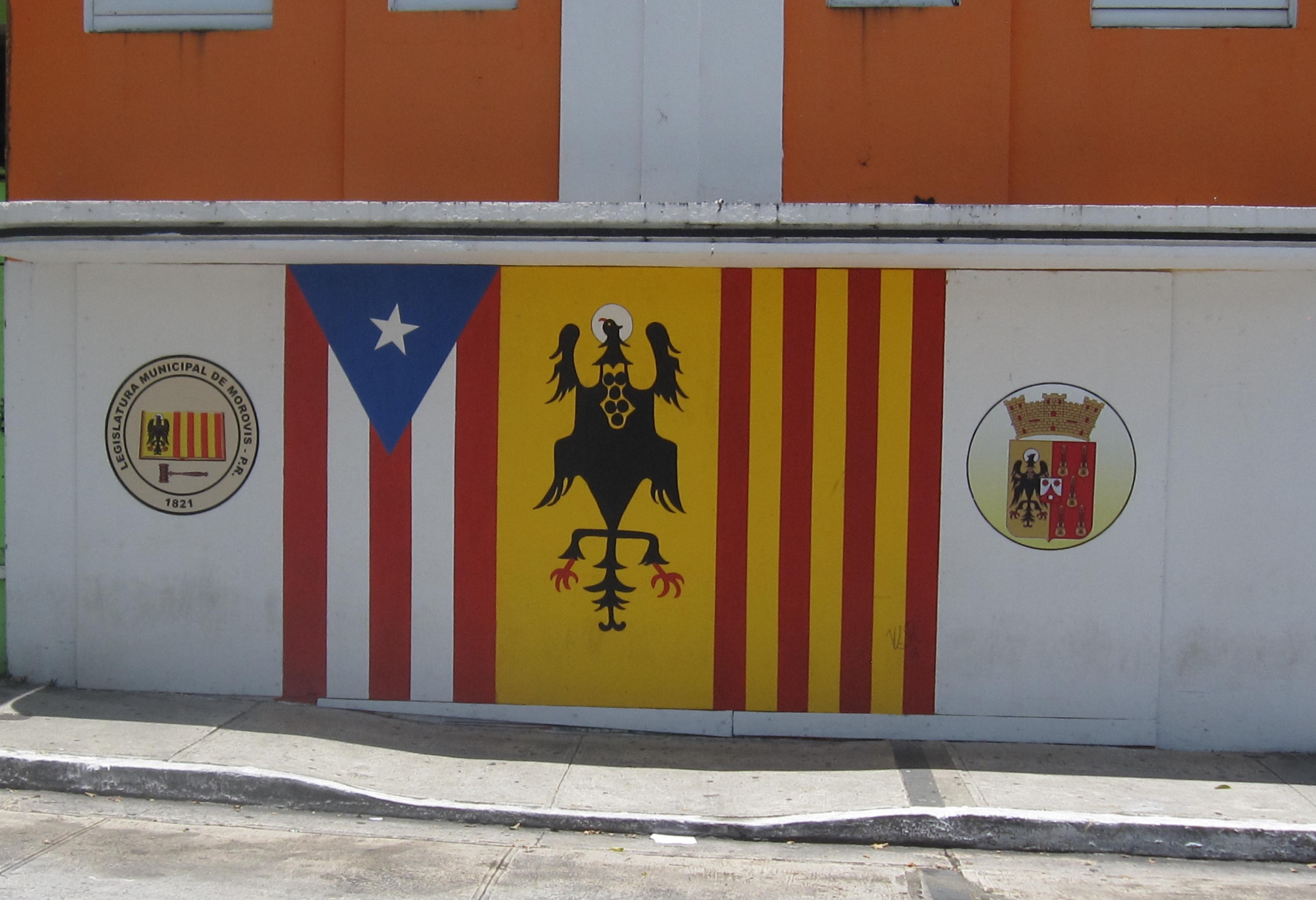
Symbols painted on wall in downtown Morovis

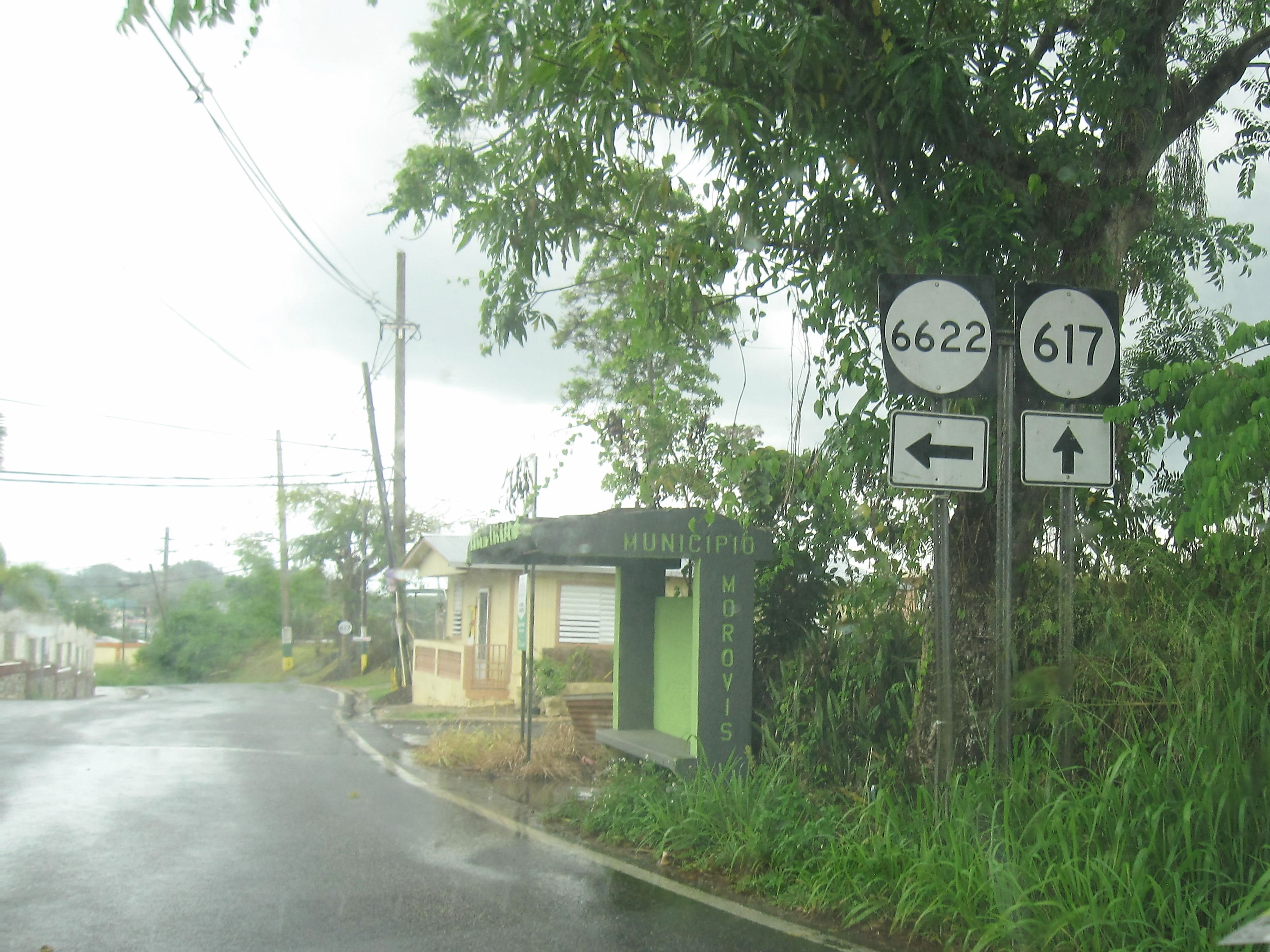
Signs for routes in Morovis

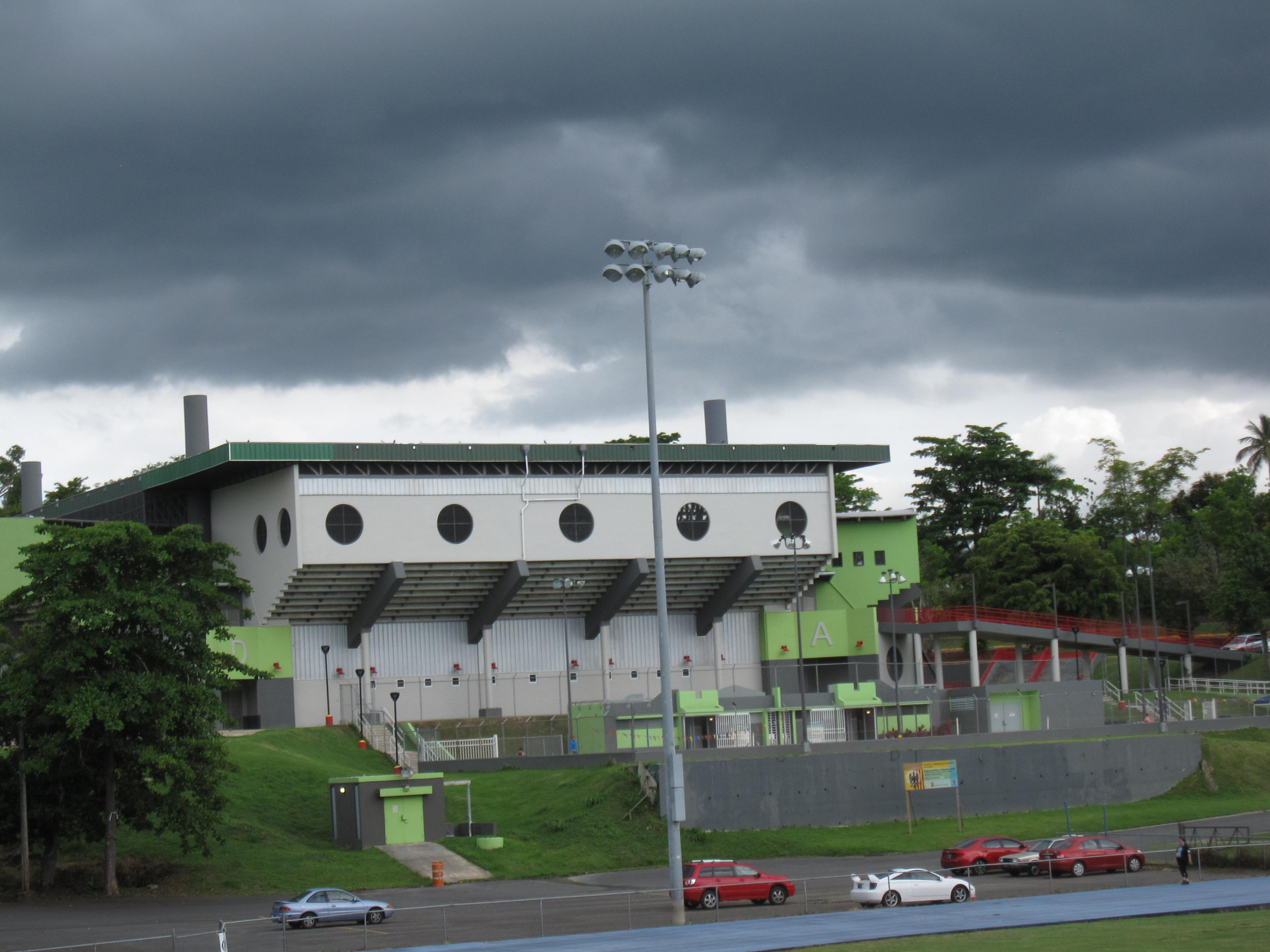
Part of the Complejo Deportivo Gerardo “Gerry” Torres, a sports complex in Morovis Pueblo

== See also ==
- List of Puerto Ricans
- History of Puerto Rico
- Did you know-Puerto Rico?
