= Cuchillas, Morovis, Puerto Rico =

Barrio of Puerto Rico

Cuchillas
- Barrio
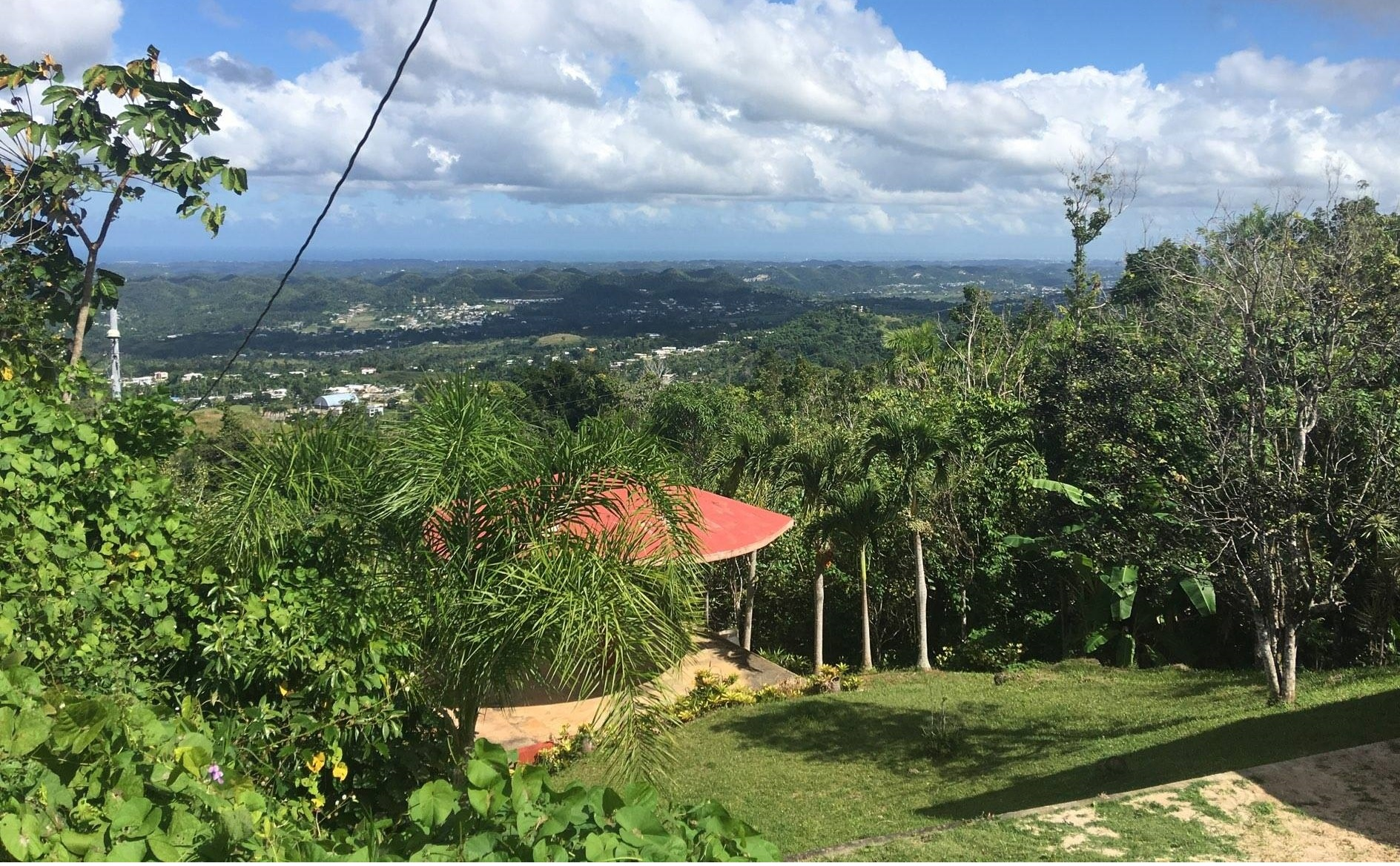
- View from near the top of Cuchillas in Morovis

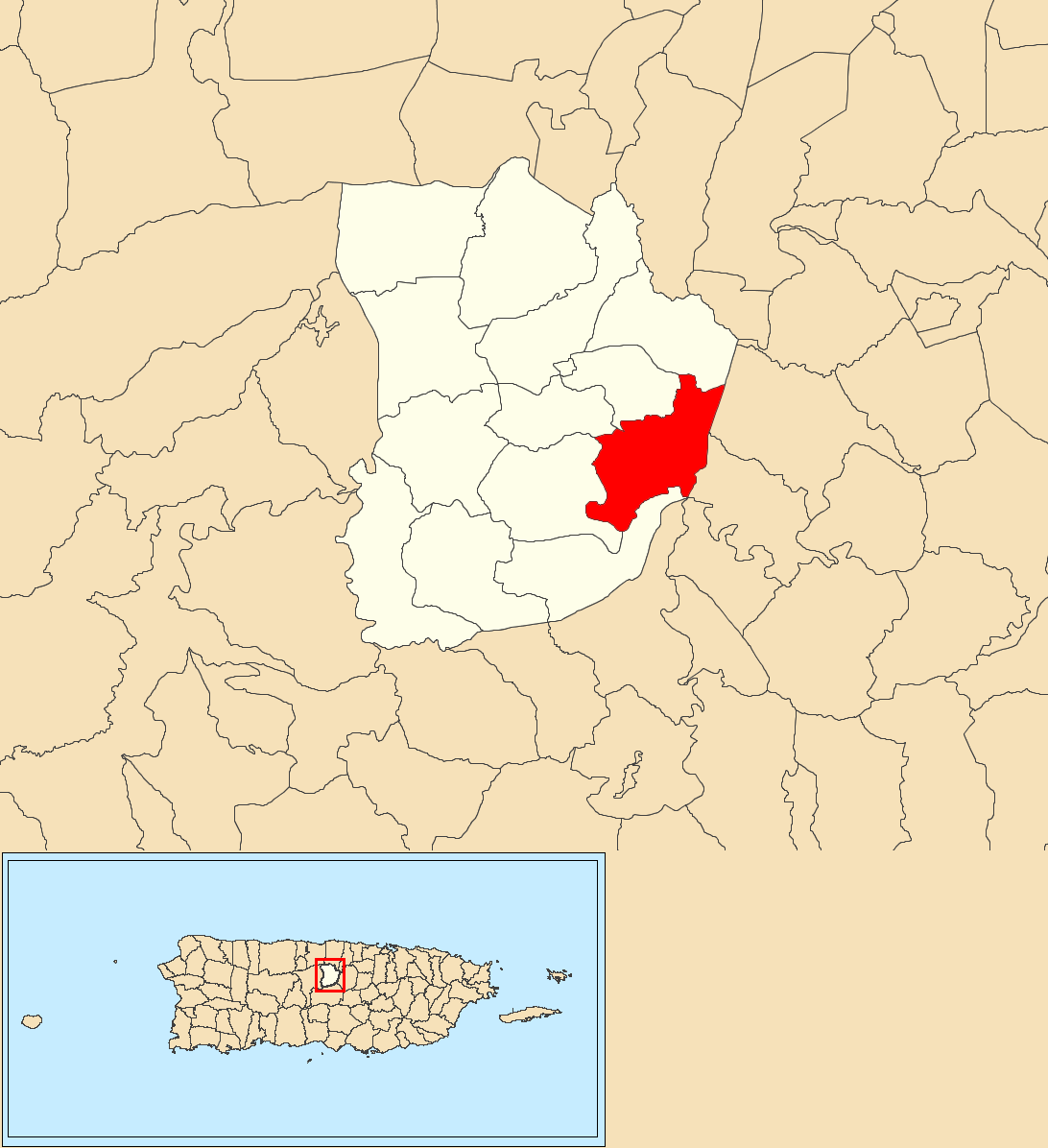
- Location of Cuchillas within the municipality of Morovis shown in red

- Location of Puerto Rico
- Coordinates: 18°18′16″N 66°23′09″W
- Commonwealth: Puerto Rico
- Municipality: Morovis

Area
  - Total: 2.9 sq mi (7.5 km^{2})
  - Land: 2.9 sq mi (7.5 km^{2})
  - Water: 0 sq mi (0 km^{2})
- Elevation: 1,148 ft (350 m)

Population (2010)
  - Total: 2,333
  - Density: 804.5/sq mi (310.6/km^{2})
- Source: 2010 Census
- Time zone: UTC−4 (AST)
- ZIP code: 00687

Cuchillas (Barrio Cuchillas) is a rural barrio in the municipality of Morovis, Puerto Rico. Cuchillas has fourteen sectors and its population in 2010 was 2,333.

== History ==
Cuchillas was in Spain's gazetteers until Puerto Rico was ceded by Spain in the aftermath of the Spanish–American War under the terms of the Treaty of Paris of 1898 and became an unincorporated territory of the United States. In 1899, the United States Department of War conducted a census of Puerto Rico finding that the population of Cuchillas barrio was 716.

Historical population
Census	Pop.	Note	%±
1900	716		—
1910	822		14.8%
1920	1,017		23.7%
1930	1,149		13.0%
1940	1,084		−5.7%
1950	1,369		26.3%
1960	1,126		−17.8%
1970	1,023		−9.1%
1980	1,021		−0.2%
1990	1,164		14.0%
2000	2,211		89.9%
2010	2,333		5.5%
U.S. Decennial Census; 1899 (shown as 1900) 1910-1930; 1930-1950 1980-2000 2010

== Sectors ==
Barrios (which are, in contemporary times, roughly comparable to minor civil divisions) in turn are further subdivided into smaller local populated place areas/units called sectores (sectors in English). The types of sectores may vary, from normally sector to urbanización to reparto to barriada to residencial, among others.

The following sectors are in Cuchillas barrio:

Parcelas Juan José Otero Claverol, Sector Cuchillas, Sector El Bombo, Sector El Cocal, Sector Gobeo, Sector La Placita, Sector Las Ánimas, Sector Los Burgos, Sector Los Otero, Sector Los Reyes, Sector Pimiento, Sector Platanal, Sector Rosado, and Sector Sandoval.

== See also ==
- List of communities in Puerto Rico
