= Morovis River =

River of Puerto Rico

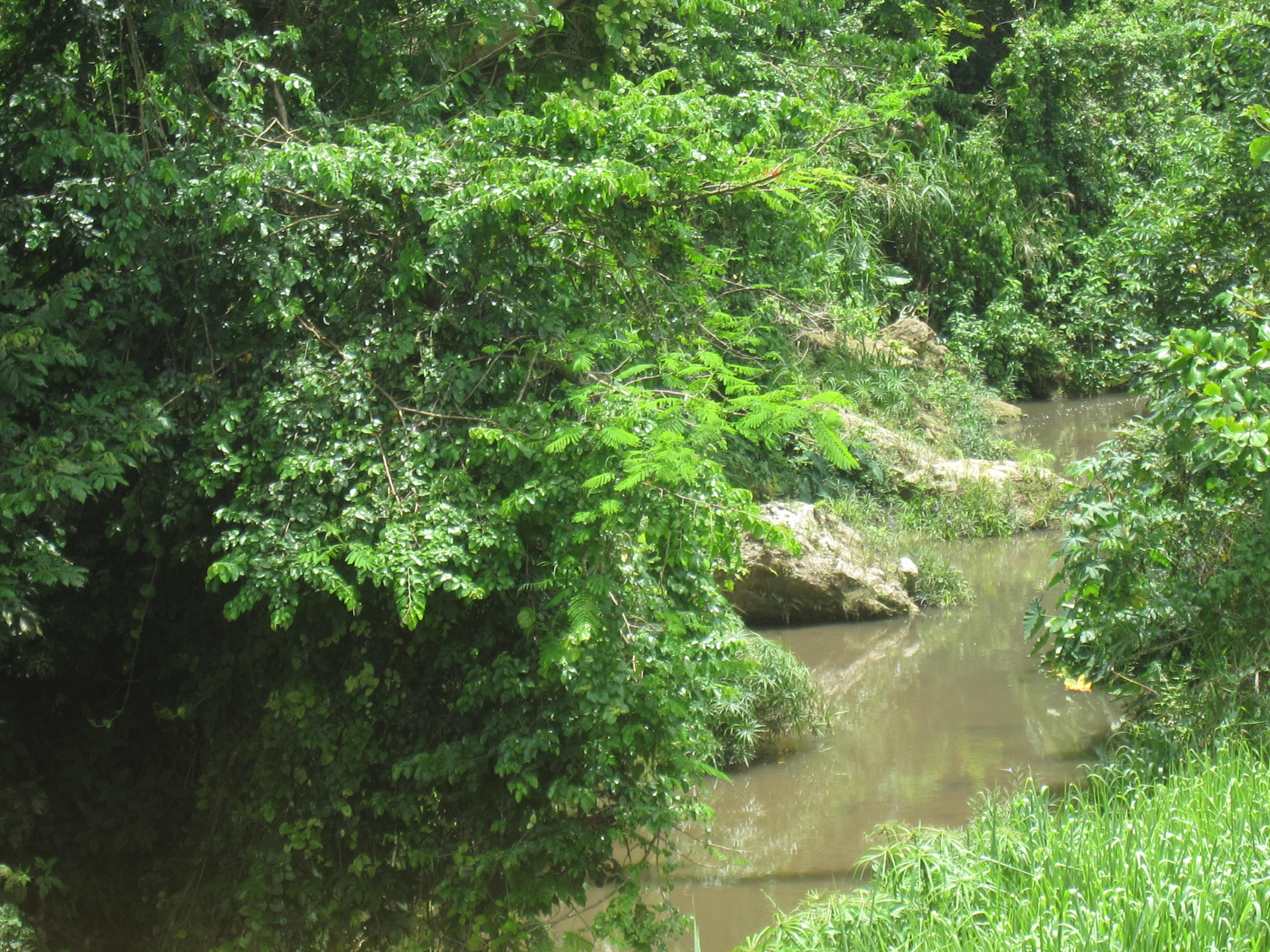
- Morovis River
- Native name: Río Morovis (Spanish)

Location
- Commonwealth: Puerto Rico
- Municipality: Morovis

Physical characteristics
- Source
  - coordinates: 18.3721720°N 66.3957257°W

The Río Morovis is a river of Morovis, Puerto Rico.

== See also ==
- List of rivers of Puerto Rico
