= Perchas, Morovis, Puerto Rico =

Barrio of Puerto Rico

Perchas
- Barrio
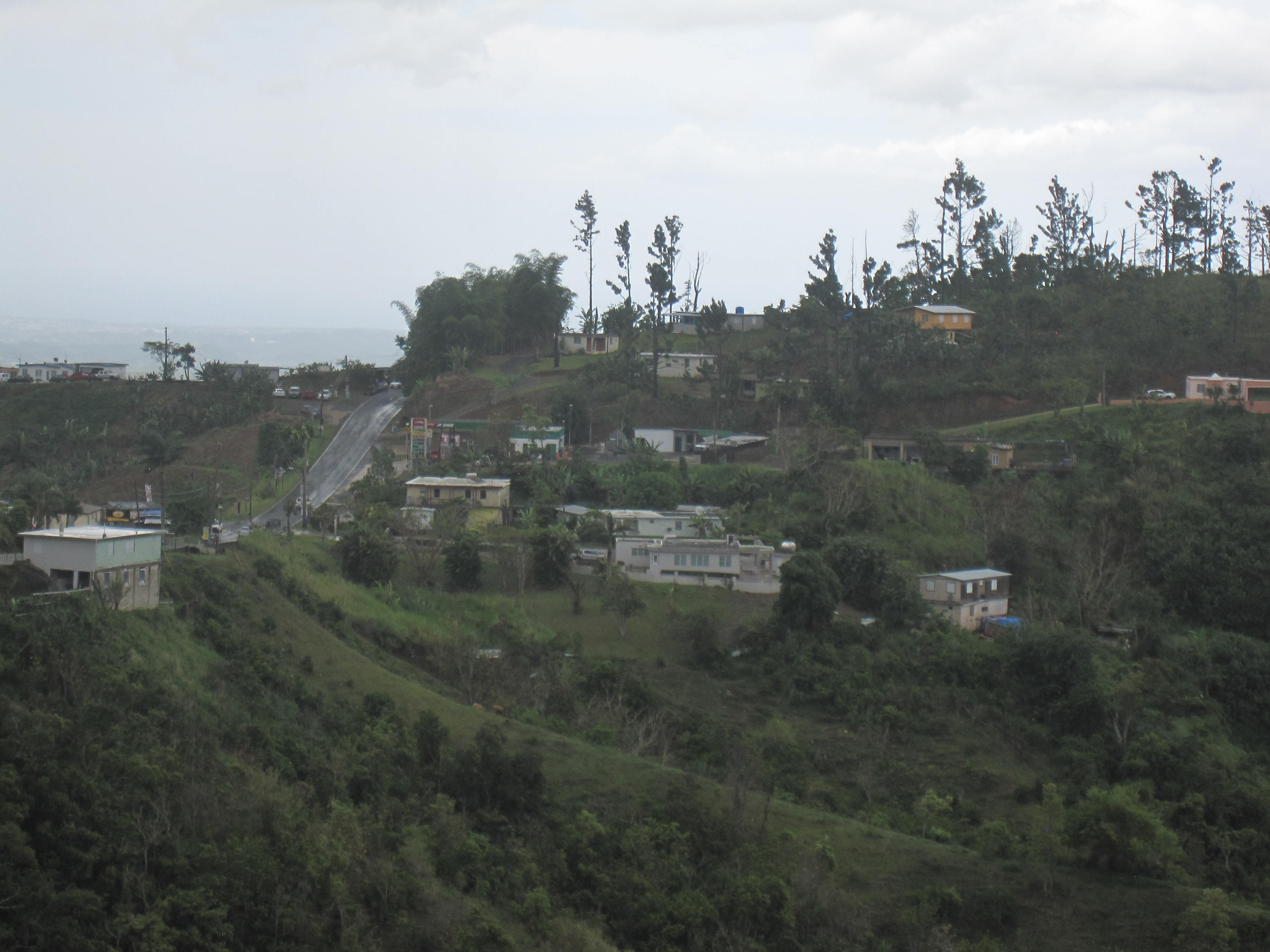
- Homes perched on mountainside on PR-155 in Perchas

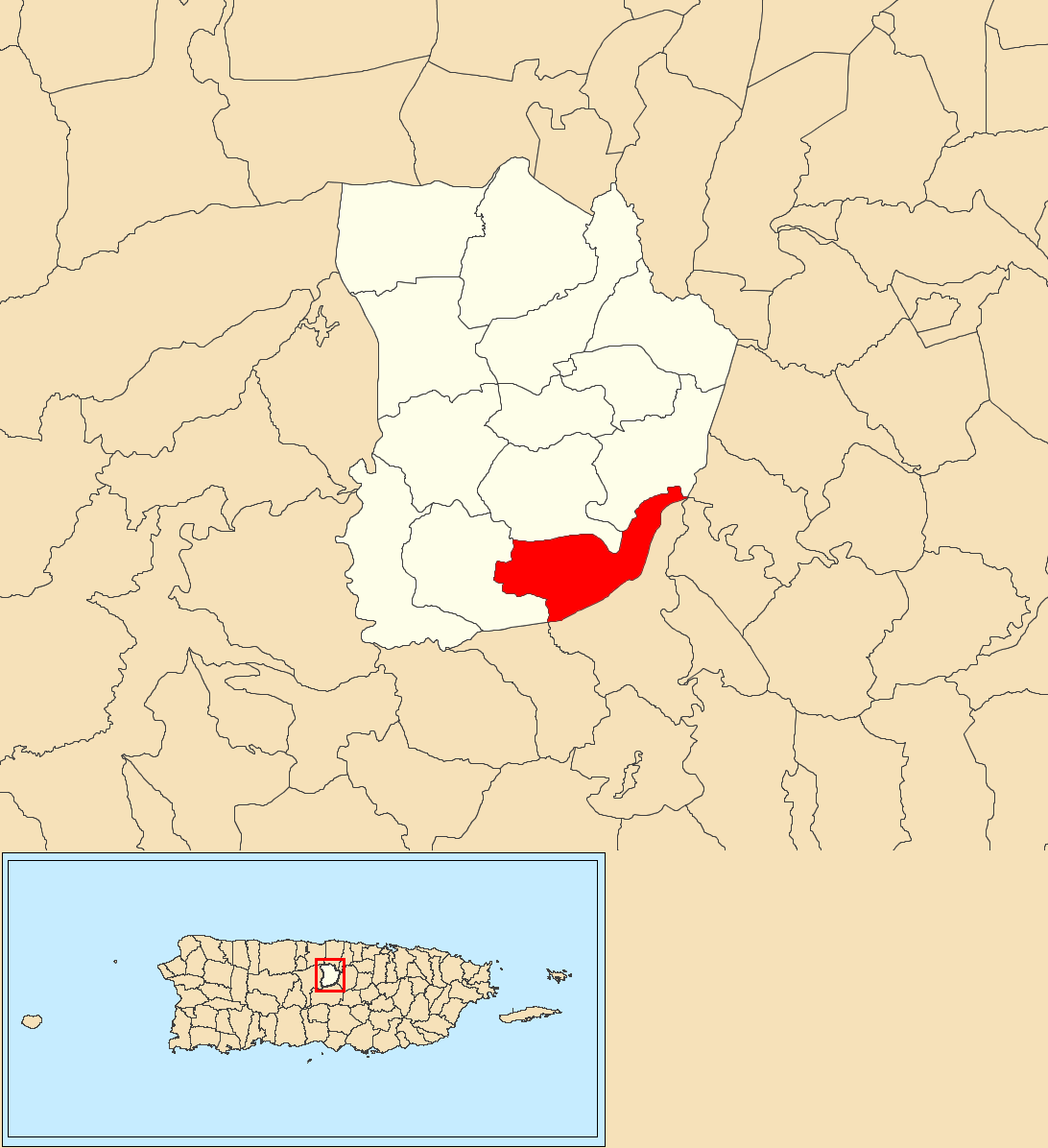
- Location of Perchas within the municipality of Morovis shown in red

- Location of Puerto Rico
- Coordinates: 18°16′40″N 66°24′14″W
- Commonwealth: Puerto Rico
- Municipality: Morovis

Area
  - Total: 2.71 sq mi (7.0 km^{2})
  - Land: 2.71 sq mi (7.0 km^{2})
  - Water: 0 sq mi (0 km^{2})
- Elevation: 1,273 ft (388 m)

Population (2010)
  - Total: 1,336
  - Density: 493/sq mi (190/km^{2})
- Source: 2010 Census
- Time zone: UTC−4 (AST)
- Zip code: 00687
- Area code: 787

Perchas is a barrio in the municipality of Morovis, Puerto Rico. Perchas has about 11 sectors and its population in 2010 was 1,336.

Puerto Rico Highway 155 from Perchas in Morovis leads to Orocovis, a bordering municipality.

== History ==
Perchas was in Spain's gazetteers until Puerto Rico was ceded by Spain in the aftermath of the Spanish–American War under the terms of the Treaty of Paris of 1898 and became an unincorporated territory of the United States. In 1899, the United States Department of War conducted a census of Puerto Rico finding that the population of Perchas barrio was 1,124.

Historical population
Census	Pop.	Note	%±
1900	1,124		—
1910	1,428		27.0%
1920	1,615		13.1%
1930	1,242		−23.1%
1940	1,434		15.5%
1950	1,091		−23.9%
1960	1,204		10.4%
1970	1,088		−9.6%
1980	942		−13.4%
1990	1,343		42.6%
2000	1,354		0.8%
2010	1,336		−1.3%
U.S. Decennial Census; 1899 (shown as 1900) 1910-1930; 1930-1950 1980-2000 2010

Hurricane Maria on September 20, 2017, caused a landslide in Perchas that caused a huge rock to teeter above Puerto Rico Highway 155, threatening homes, infrastructure and motorists. Six months later, a controlled implosion was used to disintegrate the huge rock in order for the area to be cleared of the threat.

Residents of bordering barrios then had to traverse through Perchas to reach Pueblo because over 90% of the roads were blocked by debris due to landslides and destruction to infrastructure.

== Sectors ==
Barrios (which are, in contemporary times, roughly comparable to minor civil divisions) in turn are further subdivided into smaller local populated place areas/units called sectores (sectors in English). The types of sectores may vary, from normally sector to urbanización to reparto to barriada to residencial, among others.

The following sectors are in Perchas barrio:

Sector Adrovet, Sector Arraijanes, Sector El Castillo, Sector El Zapato, Sector Los Naranjos, Sector Los Santos, Sector Perchas Díaz, Sector Perchas Quirós, Sector Perchas, Sector El Radar, and Tramo Carretera 155.

== Gallery ==
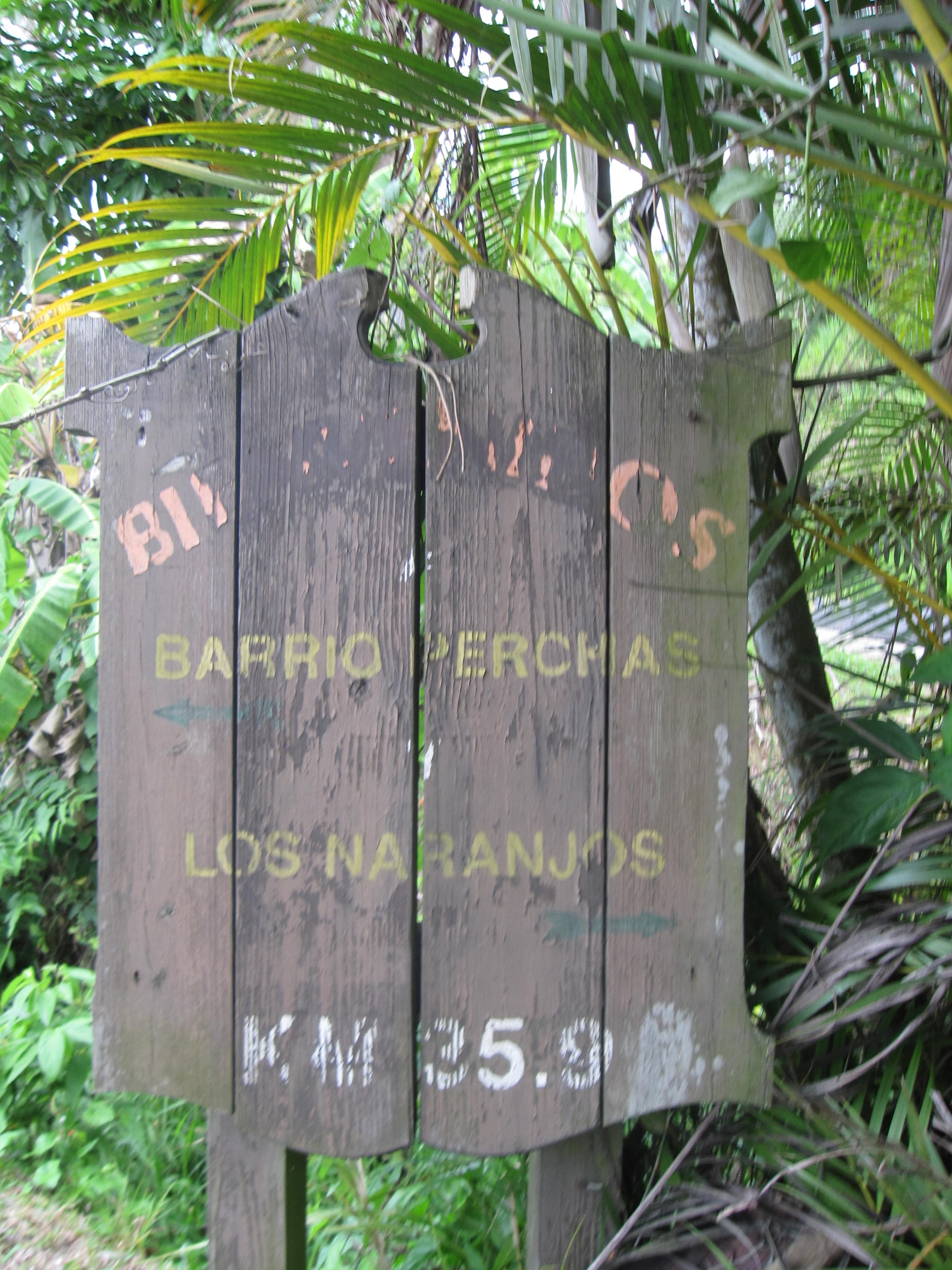
Sign in Perchas, Puerto Rico Highway 155, Km 35.9

== See also ==
- List of communities in Puerto Rico
