= Morovis Sud =

Barrio of Morovis, Puerto Rico

Morovis Sud Morovis Sur
- Barrio
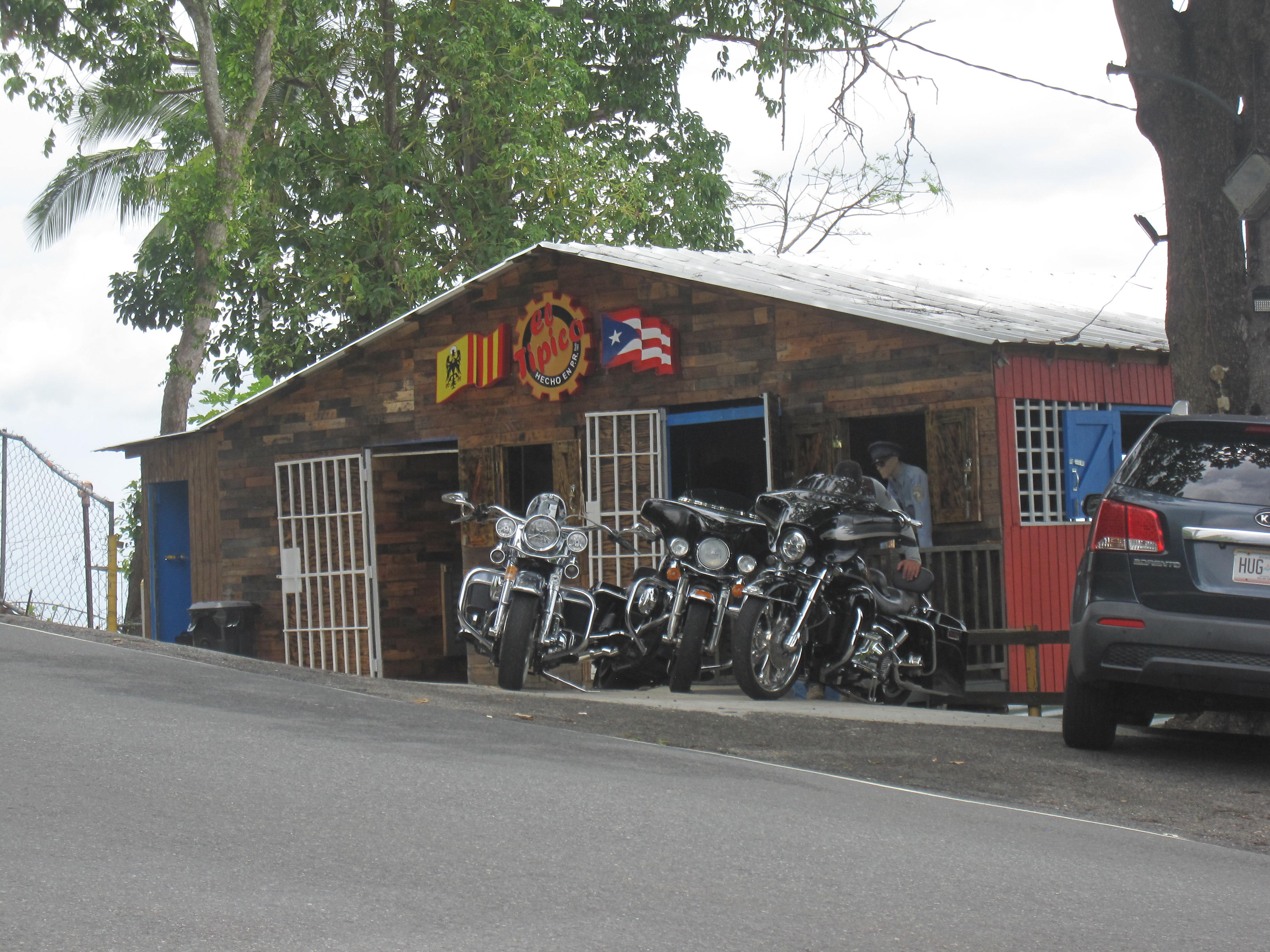
- Biker bar in Morovis Sur

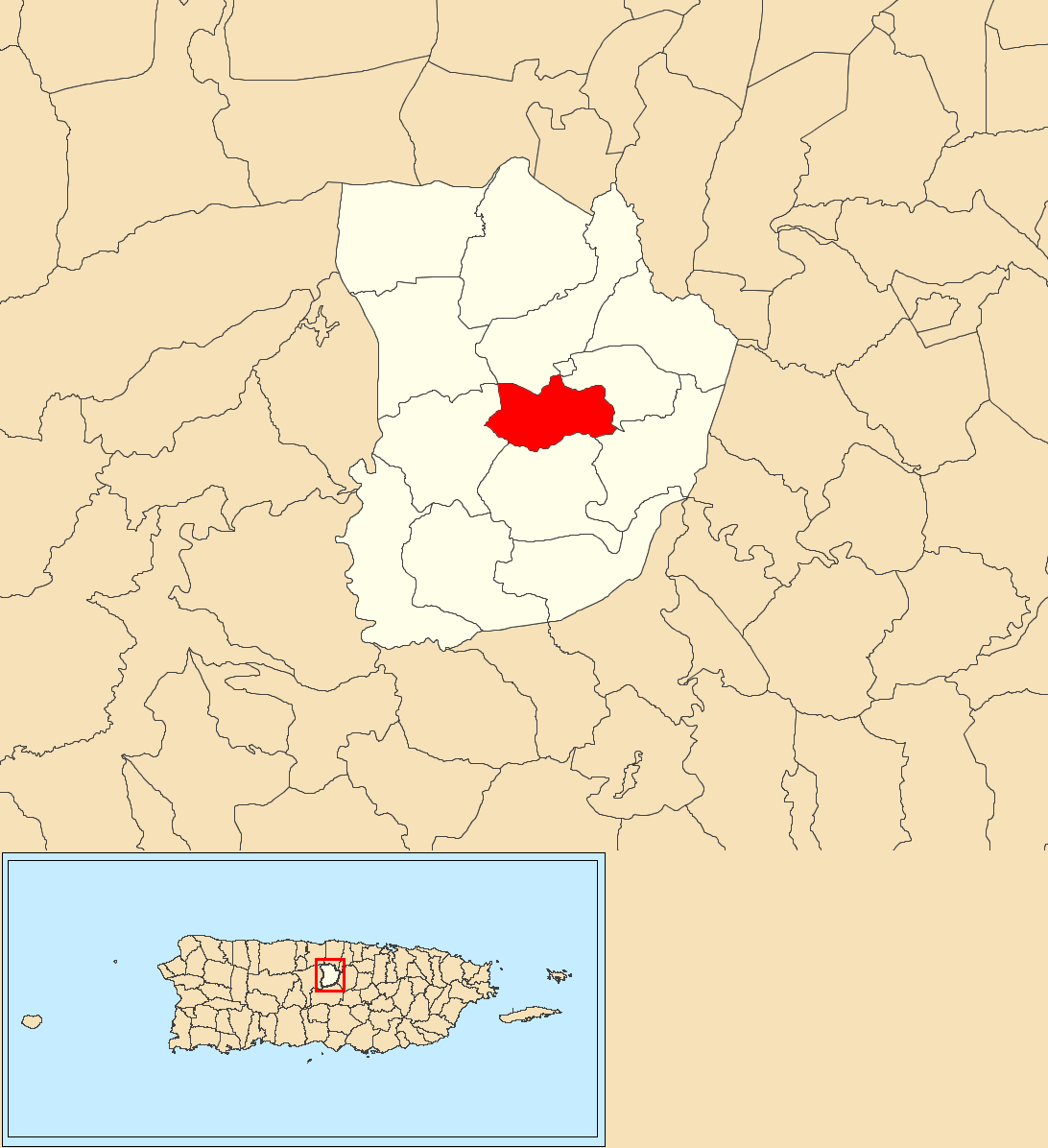
- Location of Morovis Sud within the municipality of Morovis shown in red

- Location of Puerto Rico
- Coordinates: 18°18′52″N 66°24′42″W
- Commonwealth: Puerto Rico
- Municipality: Morovis

Area
  - Total: 1.72 sq mi (4.5 km^{2})
  - Land: 1.72 sq mi (4.5 km^{2})
  - Water: 0 sq mi (0 km^{2})
- Elevation: 817 ft (249 m)

Population (2010)
  - Total: 4,208
  - Density: 2,446.5/sq mi (944.6/km^{2})
- Source: 2010 Census
- Time zone: UTC−4 (AST)
- Zip code: 00687

Morovis Sud also called Morovis Sur is a barrio in the municipality of Morovis, Puerto Rico. Morovis Sud has about 14 sectors and its population in 2010 was 4,208.

== History ==
Morovis Sur was in Spain's gazetteers until Puerto Rico was ceded by Spain in the aftermath of the Spanish–American War under the terms of the Treaty of Paris of 1898 and became an unincorporated territory of the United States. In 1899, the United States Department of War conducted a census of Puerto Rico finding that the population of Morovis Sud barrio was 487.

Historical population
| Census | Pop. | Note | %± |
|---|---|---|---|
| 1900 | 487 | | — |
| 1910 | 640 | | 31.4% |
| 1920 | 744 | | 16.3% |
| 1930 | 994 | | 33.6% |
| 1940 | 1,262 | | 27.0% |
| 1950 | 960 | | −23.9% |
| 1960 | 982 | | 2.3% |
| 1970 | 0 | | −100.0% |
| 1980 | 1,650 | | — |
| 1990 | 2,535 | | 53.6% |
| 2000 | 3,595 | | 41.8% |
| 2010 | 4,208 | | 17.1% |
U.S. Decennial Census; 1899 (shown as 1900) 1910-1930; 1930-1950 1980-2000 2010

== Sectors ==
Barrios (which are, in contemporary times, roughly comparable to minor civil divisions) in turn are further subdivided into smaller local populated place areas/units called sectores (sectors in English). The types of sectores may vary, from normally sector to urbanización to reparto to barriada to residencial, among others.

The following sectors are in Morovis Sur barrio:

Parcelas Padre Rosendo, Reparto Toñita Peña, Sector Del Carmen, Sector Garrochales, Sector Jobo, Sector La Coroza, Sector Las 40, Sector Palo de Pan, Sector Vereda, Tramo Carretera 155, Urbanización Palmas del Sur, Urbanización Praderas de Morovis Sur, Urbanización San Gabriel, and Urbanización Vista Verde.

== Gallery ==
Scenes in Morovis Sud (Sur)

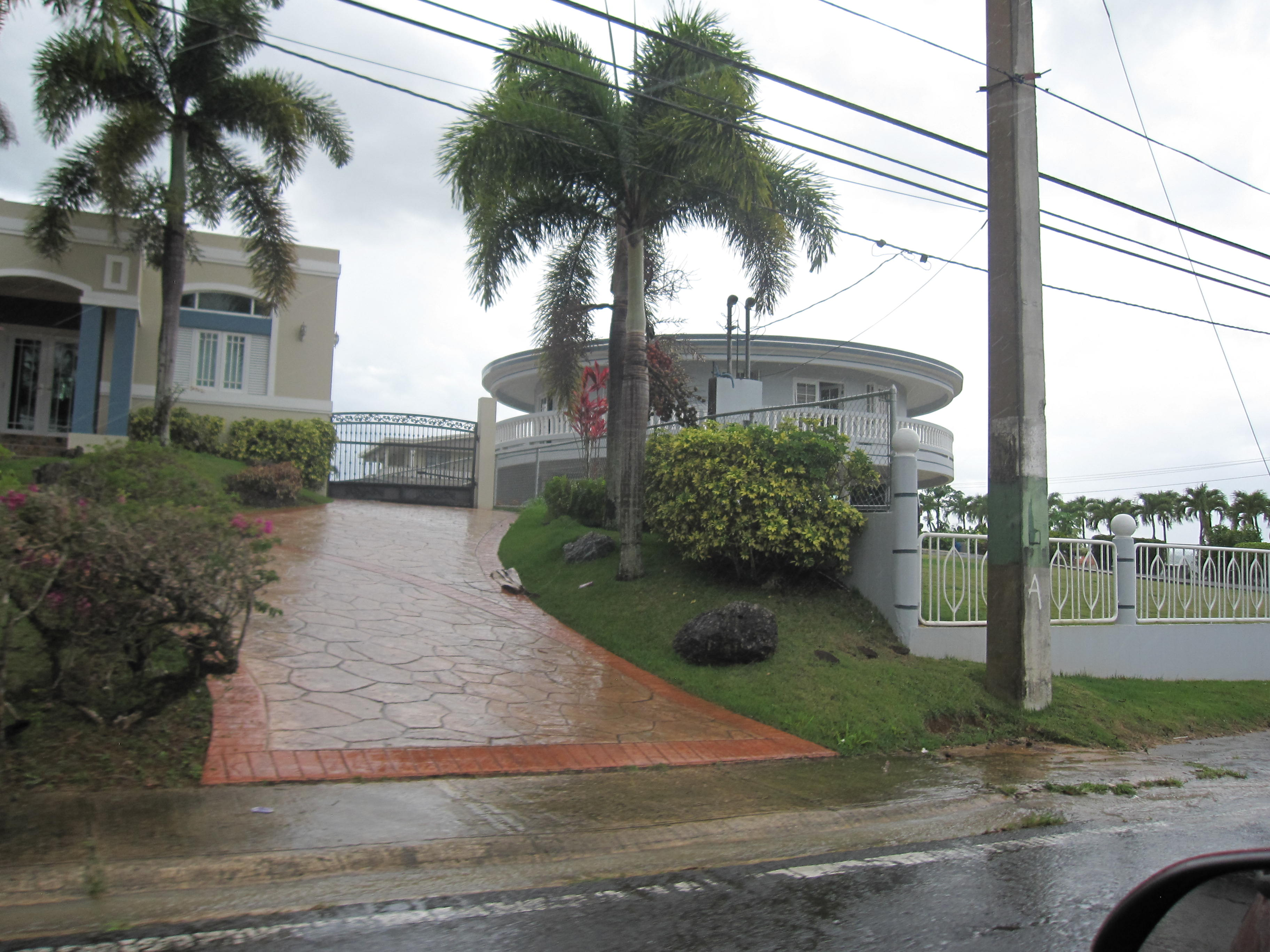
Houses on PR-6622 in Sector La Línea

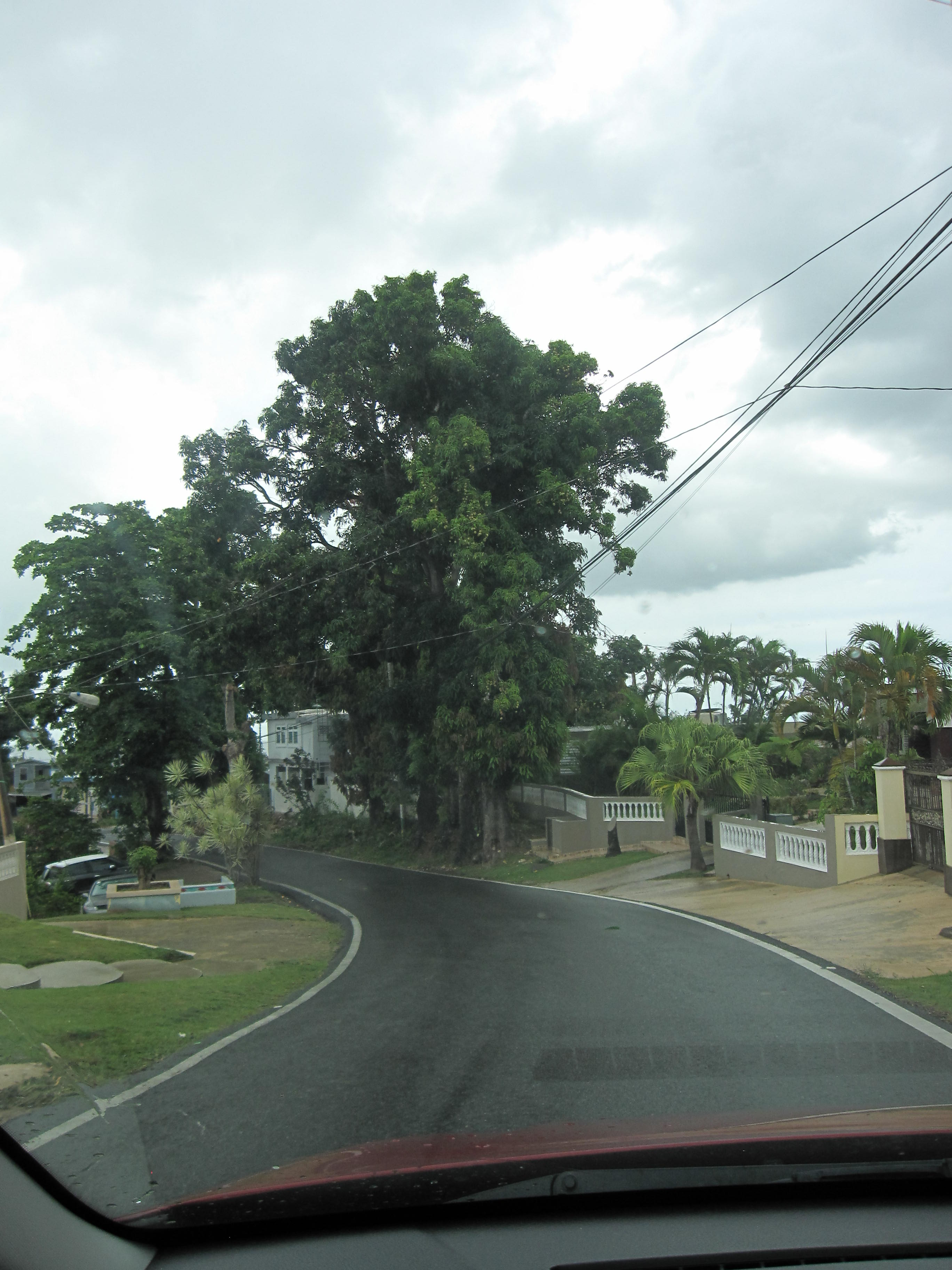
PR-617 in Morovis Sud (Sur), northbound

== See also ==
- List of communities in Puerto Rico
