= List of barrios and sectors of Morovis, Puerto Rico =

Like all municipalities of Puerto Rico, Morovis is subdivided into administrative units called barrios, which are, in contemporary times, roughly comparable to minor civil divisions, (and means wards or boroughs or neighborhoods in English). The barrios and subbarrios, in turn, are further subdivided into smaller local populated place areas/units called sectores (sectors in English). The types of sectores may vary, from normally sector to urbanización to reparto to barriada to residencial, among others. Some sectors appear in two barrios.

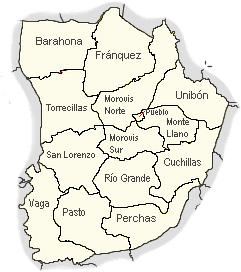
Morovis map with barrio subdivisions

== List of sectors by barrio ==
=== Barahona ===
- Carretera 633
- Parcelas Barahona
- Sector Cabachuelas I
- Sector Germán Vega
- Sector La Lomita
- Sector Los Currás
- Sector Siete Cuerdas
- Sector Villa Roca
- Urbanización Brisas de Barahona
- Urbanización Hacienda Las Marías
- Urbanización Reparto Los Torres
- Urbanización Valle San Luis
- Valle Barahona

=== Cuchillas ===
- Parcelas Juan José Otero Claverol
- Sector Cuchillas
- Sector El Bombo
- Sector El Cocal
- Sector Gobeo
- Sector La Placita
- Sector Las Ánimas
- Sector Los Burgos
- Sector Los Otero
- Sector Los Reyes
- Sector Pimiento
- Sector Platanal
- Sector Rosado
- Sector Sandoval

=== Fránquez ===
- Comunidad Fránquez
- Sector Alianza
- Sector Dávila
- Sector Los Rosario
- Sector Meléndez
- Sector Narváez
- Sector Pabón
- Sector Pedro Meléndez Sánchez
- Sector Rolón
- Sector Rosado
- Sector Socucho
- Urbanización La Alianza

=== Monte Llano ===
- Apartamentos Morovis Elderly
- Apartamentos Parque del Retiro II
- Avenida Corozal
- Condominio Mariví
- Residencial Padre Tomás Sorolla
- Sector Avenida Patrón (Calle Patrón)
- Sector El Tambor
- Sector La Aldea
- Sector La Fábrica
- Sector La Trinchera
- Tramo Carretera 159
- Urbanización Colinas de Montellano
- Urbanización Estancias de Montellano
- Urbanización Jardines de Montellano
- Urbanización Russe

=== Morovis barrio-pueblo ===
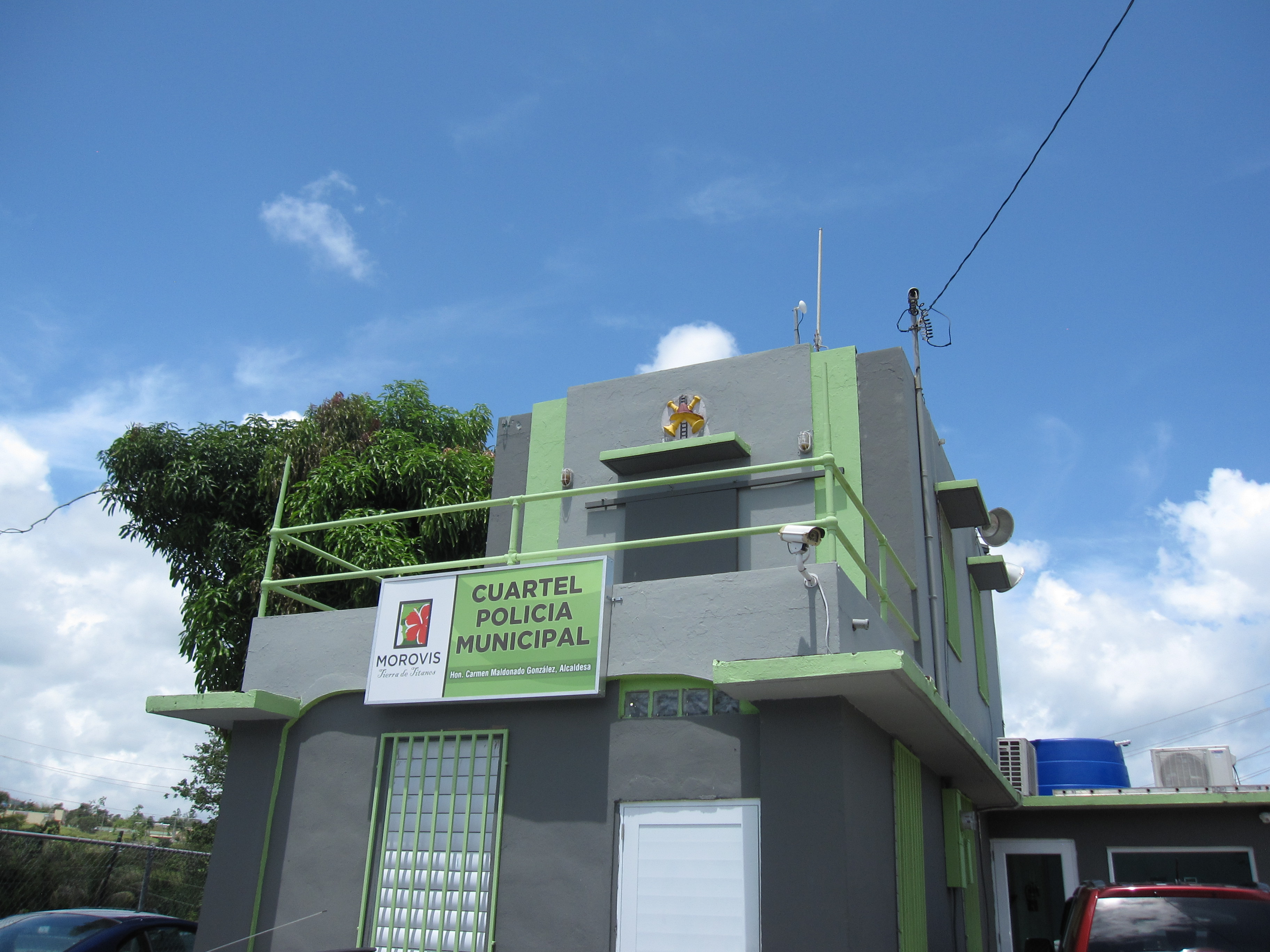
Municipal police station near Sector La Marina

- Avenida Buena Vista (Flamboyán)
- Avenida Corozal
- Barriada Ensanche
- Barriada Santo Domingo
- Calle Baldorioty Final (Acueducto)
- Extensión Baldorioty
- Sector Buenos Aires
- Sector La Marina
- Sector Pellejas
- Sector Vietnam
- Tramo Carretera 159 (Carol & Joe)
- Urbanización Jardines de Flamboyán

=== Morovis Norte ===
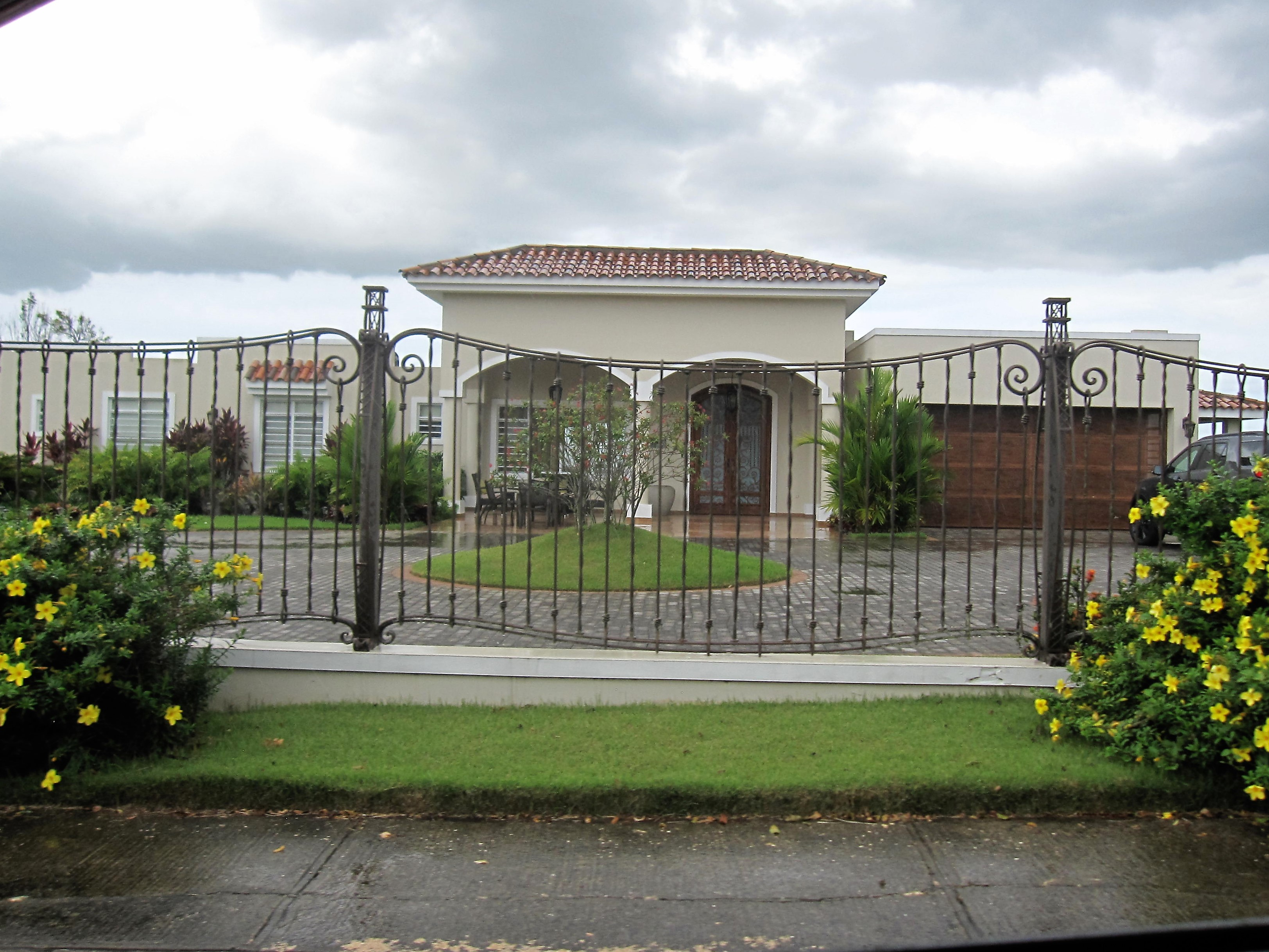
House in Sector La Línea, on the Morovis Norte side of PR-6622

- Apartamentos Santiago
- Sector Buena Vista
- Sector El Cerro
- Sector El Tendal
- Sector Hoyo Frío
- Sector La Línea
- Sector Los Russe
- Sector Puente Colorao
- Urbanización Brisas del Norte
- Urbanización Cruz Rosario
- Urbanización Jardines de Romaní
- Urbanización Las Cumbres
- Urbanización Quintas de Morovis
- Urbanización Tajaomar
- Urbanización Villas Del Norte

=== Morovis Sud ===
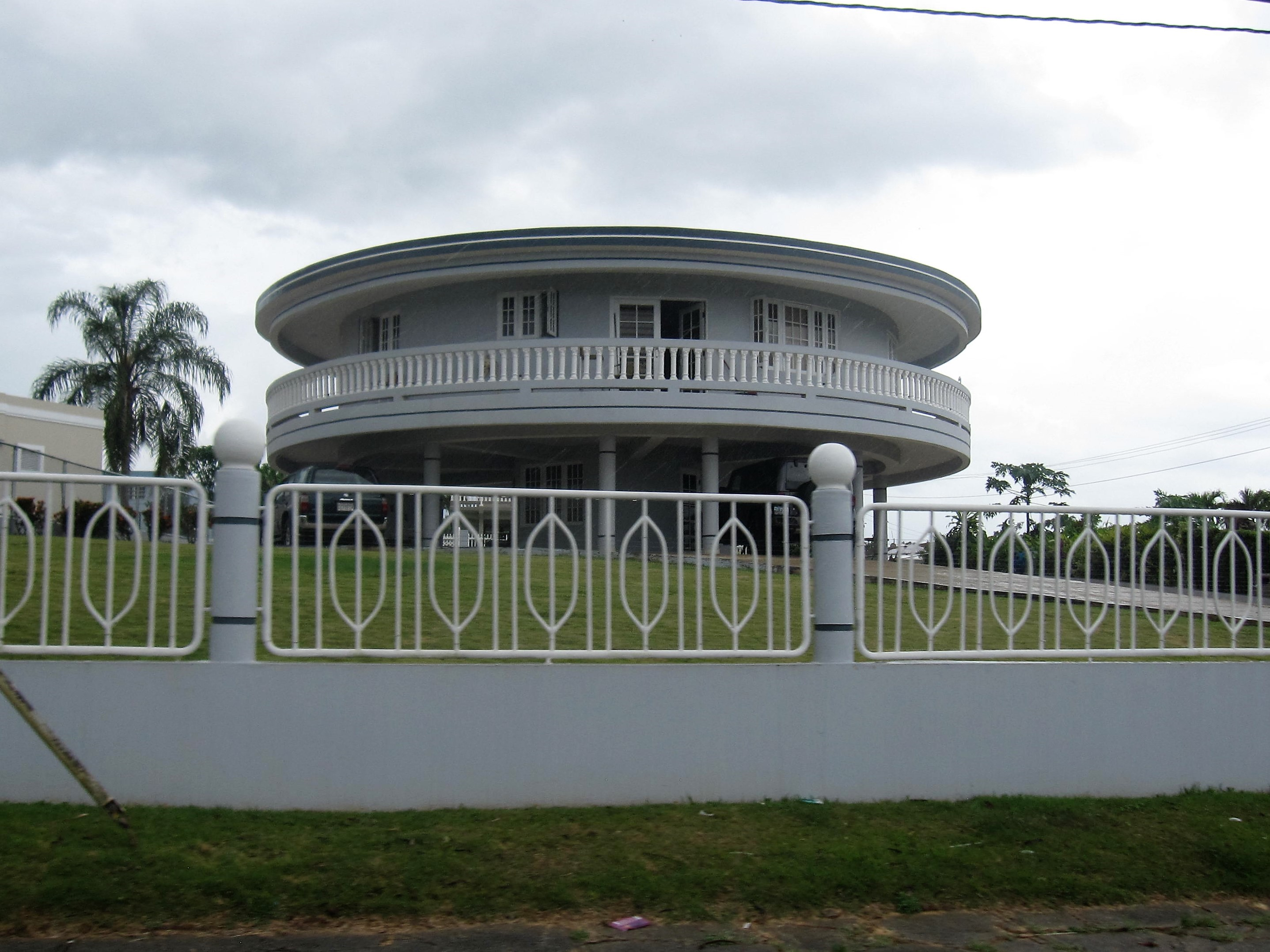
Circular home on PR-6622 in Sector La Línea, Morovis Sud (Sur)

- Parcelas Padre Rosendo
- Reparto Toñita Peña
- Sector Del Carmen
- Sector Garrochales
- Sector Jobo
- Sector La Coroza
- Sector La Línea
- Sector Las 40
- Sector Palo de Pan
- Sector Vereda
- Tramo Carretera 155
- Urbanización Palmas del Sur
- Urbanización Praderas de Morovis Sur
- Urbanización San Gabriel
- Urbanización Vista Verde

=== Pasto ===
- Sector Culebra
- Sector Flamboyán
- Sector Galán
- Sector Limones
- Sector Los Pérez
- Sector Orquídeas
- Sector Pasto
- Sector Trinchera

=== Perchas ===
- Sector Adrovet
- Sector Arraijanes
- Sector El Castillo
- Sector El Zapato
- Sector Los Naranjos
- Sector Los Santos
- Sector Perchas Díaz
- Sector Perchas Quirós
- Sector Perchas
- Sector Radar
- Tramo Carretera 155

=== Río Grande ===
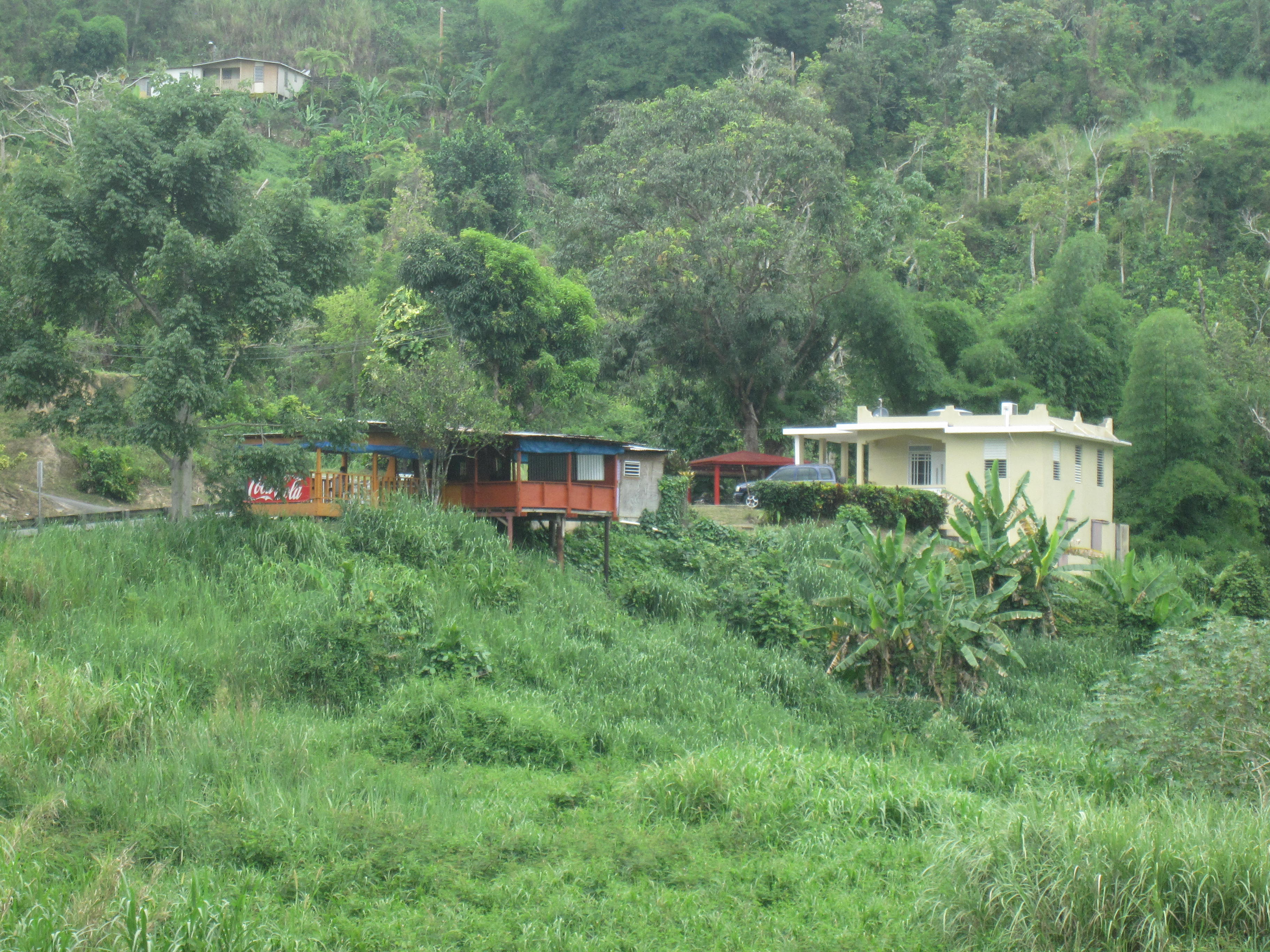
Homes in Sector La Playita

- Sector Delgado
- Sector El Cerro
- Sector Fontán
- Sector La Playita
- Sector Los Quendo
- Tramo Carretera 155

=== San Lorenzo ===
- Parcelas San Lorenzo
- Sector Berio
- Sector El Rayo
- Sector El Salto
- Sector La Prá
- Sector Marrero

=== Torrecillas ===
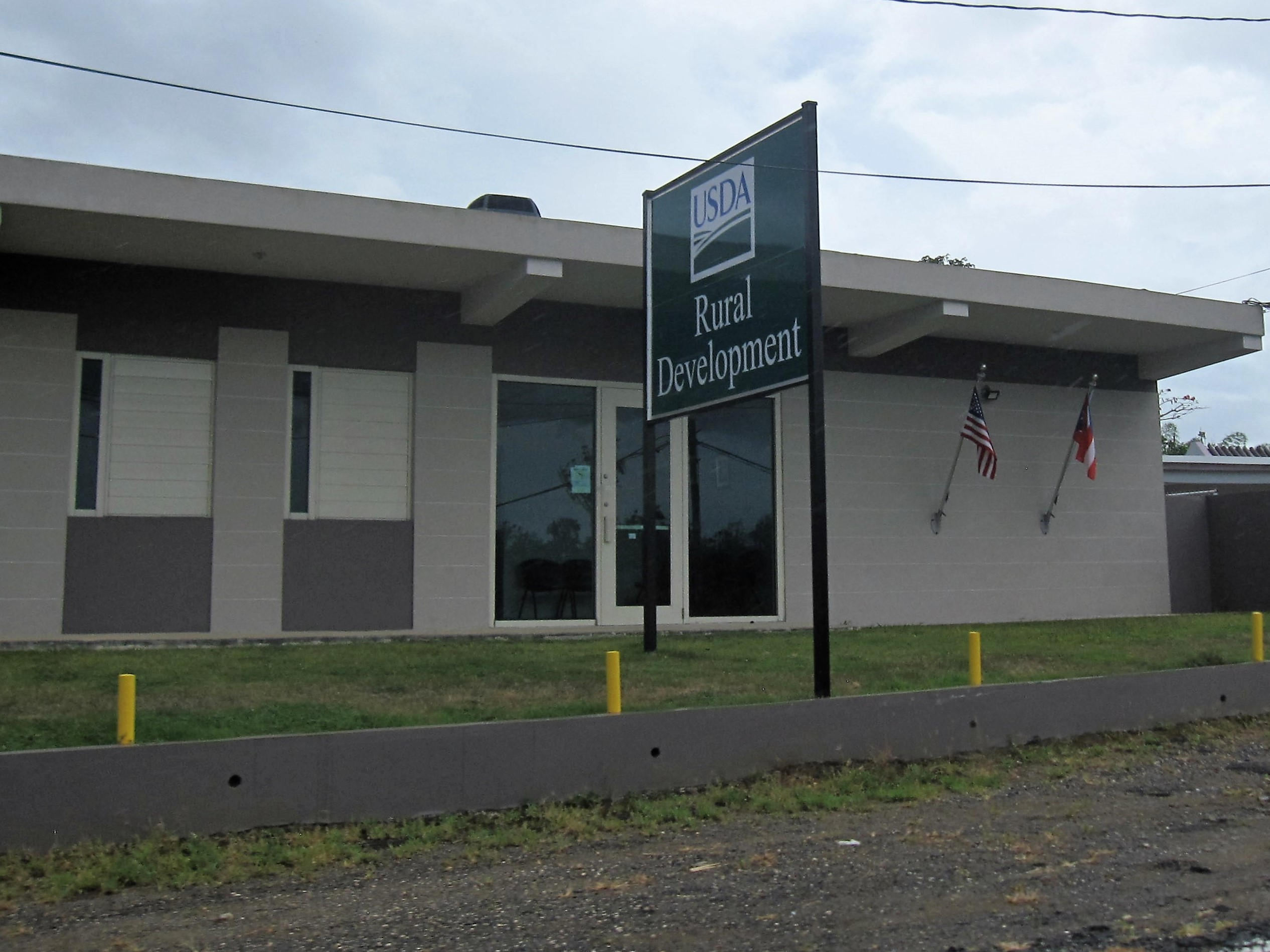
SDA Rural Development on PR-6622, Sector La Línea, Torrecillas

- Parcelas Extensión Torrecillas
- Sector Cabachuelas II
- Sector La Cuesta de los Guanos
- Sector La Línea
- Sector Las Lajas
- Sector Ventana
- Urbanización La Línea
- Urbanización Tulipanes

=== Unibón ===
- Parcelas Ramón Pabón
- Sector Archilla
- Sector El Puente
- Sector Gallera
- Sector Los Santos
- Sector Padre Ibáñez
- Sector Patrón
- Sector Pedroza
- Tramo Carretera 159
- Urbanización Brisas del Río
- Urbanización John Díaz
- Urbanización Laderas del Río Unibón
- Urbanización Matos
- Urbanización Riberas de Unibón
- Urbanización Rodríguez

=== Vaga ===
- Sector Vaga
- Sector Vaga 1
- Sector Vaga 3

== See also ==
- List of communities in Puerto Rico
