= Puerto Rico Highway 145 =

Highway in Puerto Rico

Highway 145
- Ruta 145

Route information
- Maintained by Puerto Rico DTPW
- Length: 7.5 km (4.7 mi)

Major junctions
- West end: PR-146 / PR-149 in Jaguas
- PR-6632 in Jaguas; PR-567 / PR-6622 in Torrecillas–Morovis Norte
- East end: PR-155 / PR-634 in Morovis Norte–Torrecillas–Fránquez

Location
- Country: United States
- Territory: Puerto Rico
- Municipalities: Ciales, Morovis

Highway system
- Roads in Puerto Rico; List
← PR-144	→ PR-146

Puerto Rico Highway 145 (PR-145) is a rural road that travels from Ciales, Puerto Rico to Morovis. This road extends from its junction with PR-146 and PR-149 near downtown Ciales, and ends at PR-155 between Morovis Norte, Torrecillas and Fránquez barrios.

== Route description ==
Puerto Rico Highway 145

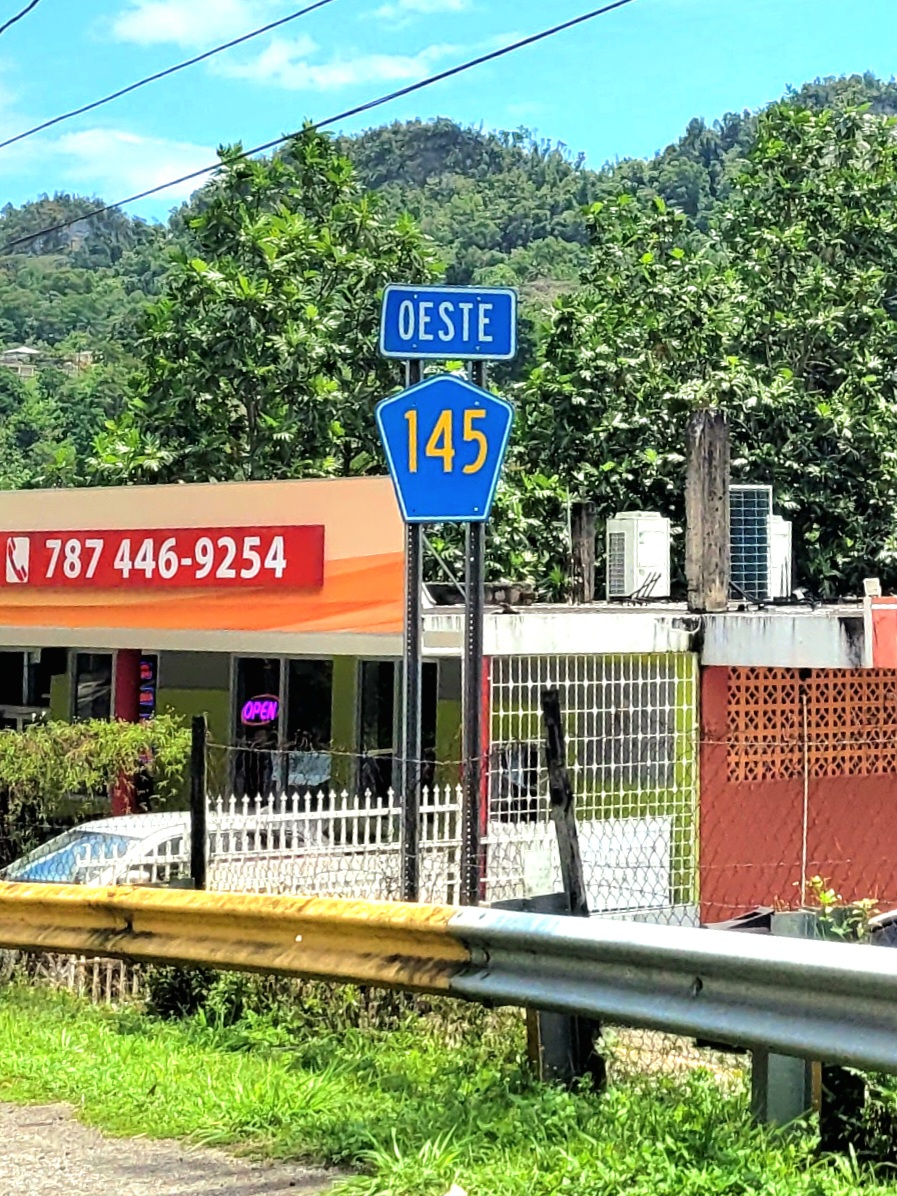
Heading west in Jaguas, Ciales

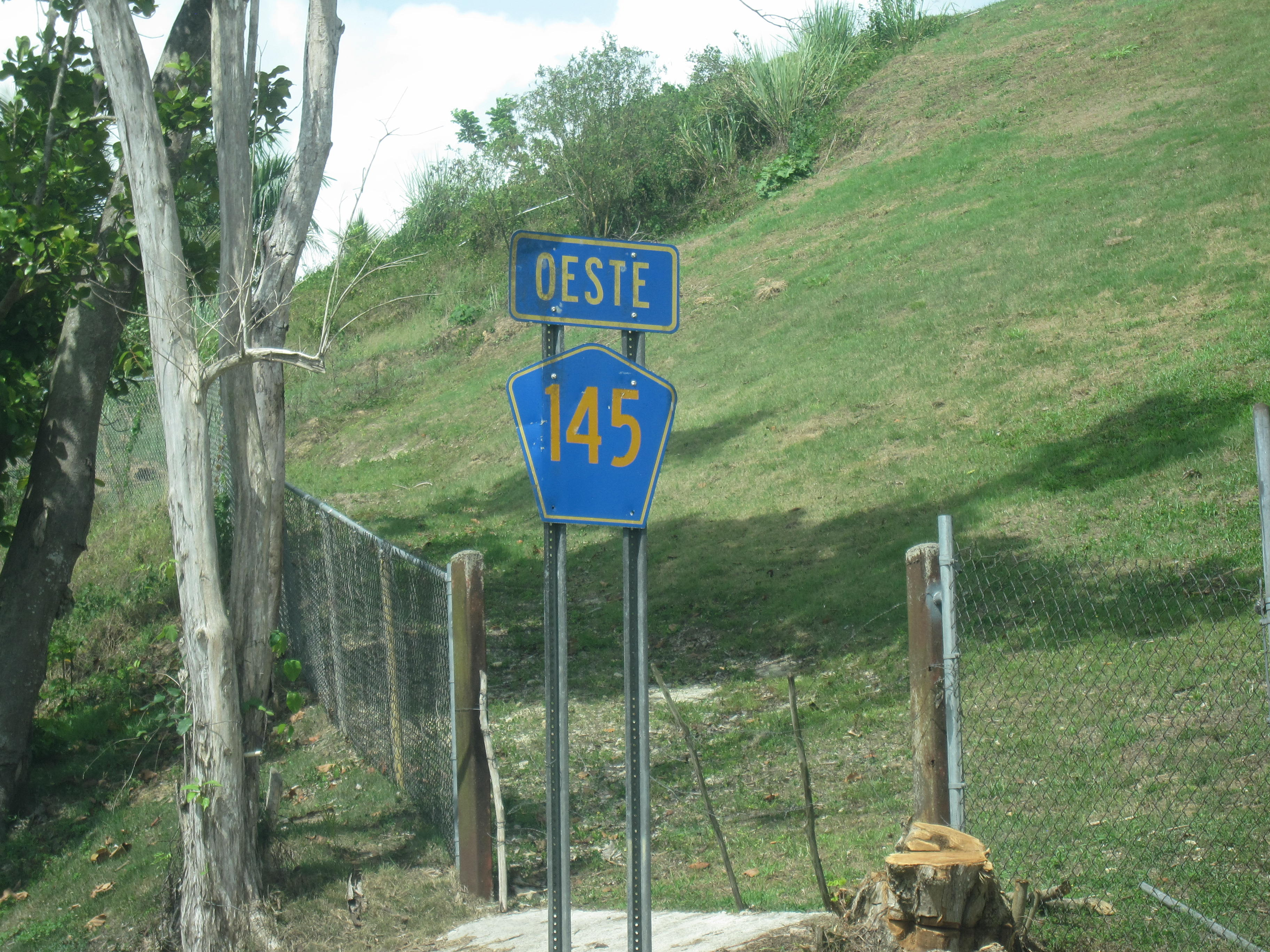
Heading west in Torrecillas, Morovis

With a length of about 7.5 kilometers (4.7 mi), PR-145 begins at the intersection of PR-149 and PR-146 located in Jaguas, a barrio located close to downtown Ciales. After the junction, PR-145 turns south as a bypass that serves as an alternate route for PR-149 to avoiding downtown Ciales from the eastern side of the downtown. At PR-6632 intersection, PR-145 goes east, crossing the Río Grande de Manatí and climbing the mountains to Morovis. In Morovis, the highway meets with PR-567, which leads to Orocovis. In this junction located between Torrecillas and Morovis Norte barrios, PR-145 turns north until its eastern terminus at PR-155 and PR-634 intersection between Morovis Norte, Torrecillas and Fránquez.

== Major intersections ==
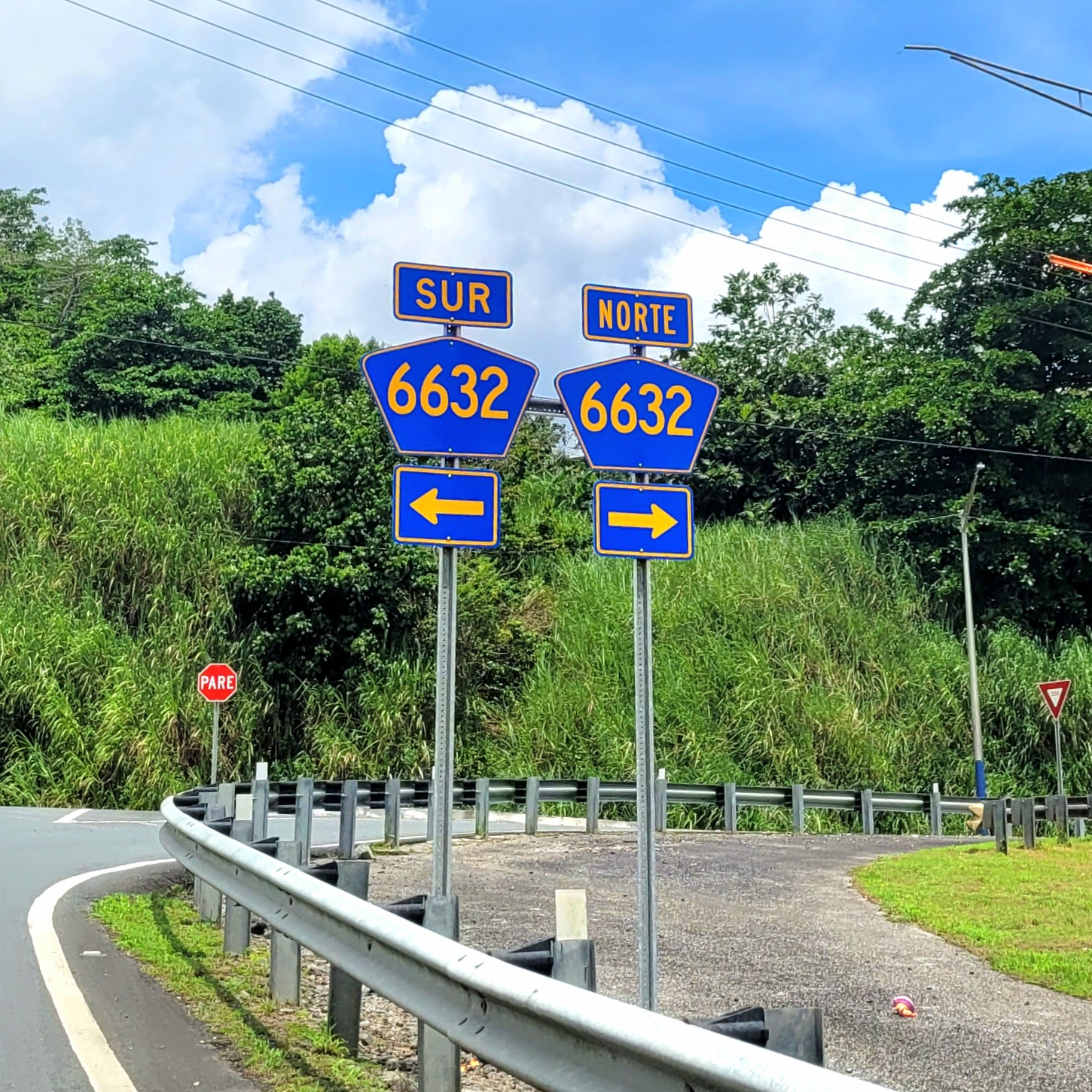
PR-145 west at its junction with PR-6632 in Jaguas, Ciales

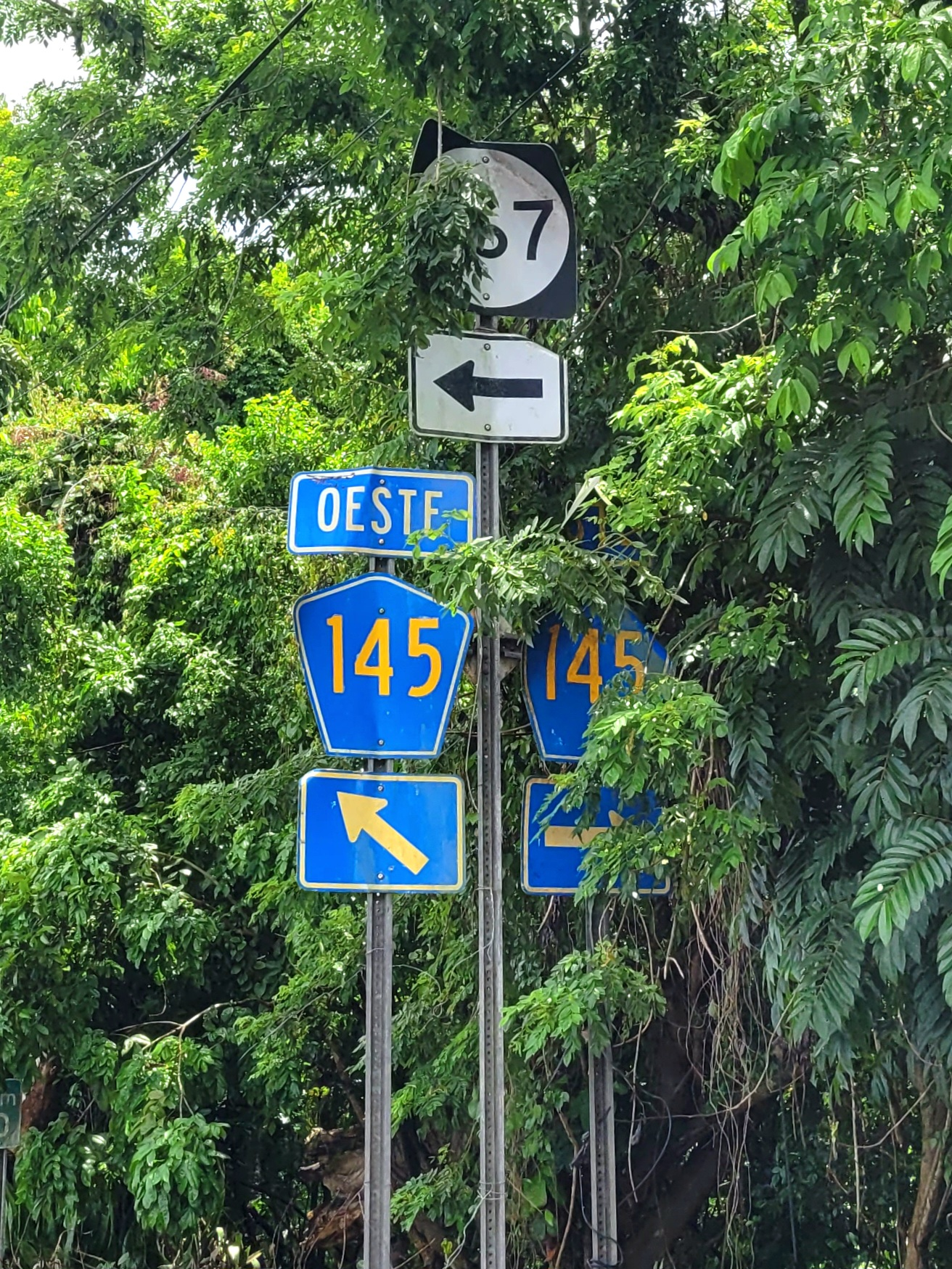
PR-6622 west at its junction with PR-145 and PR-567 south between Morovis Norte and Torrecillas barrios

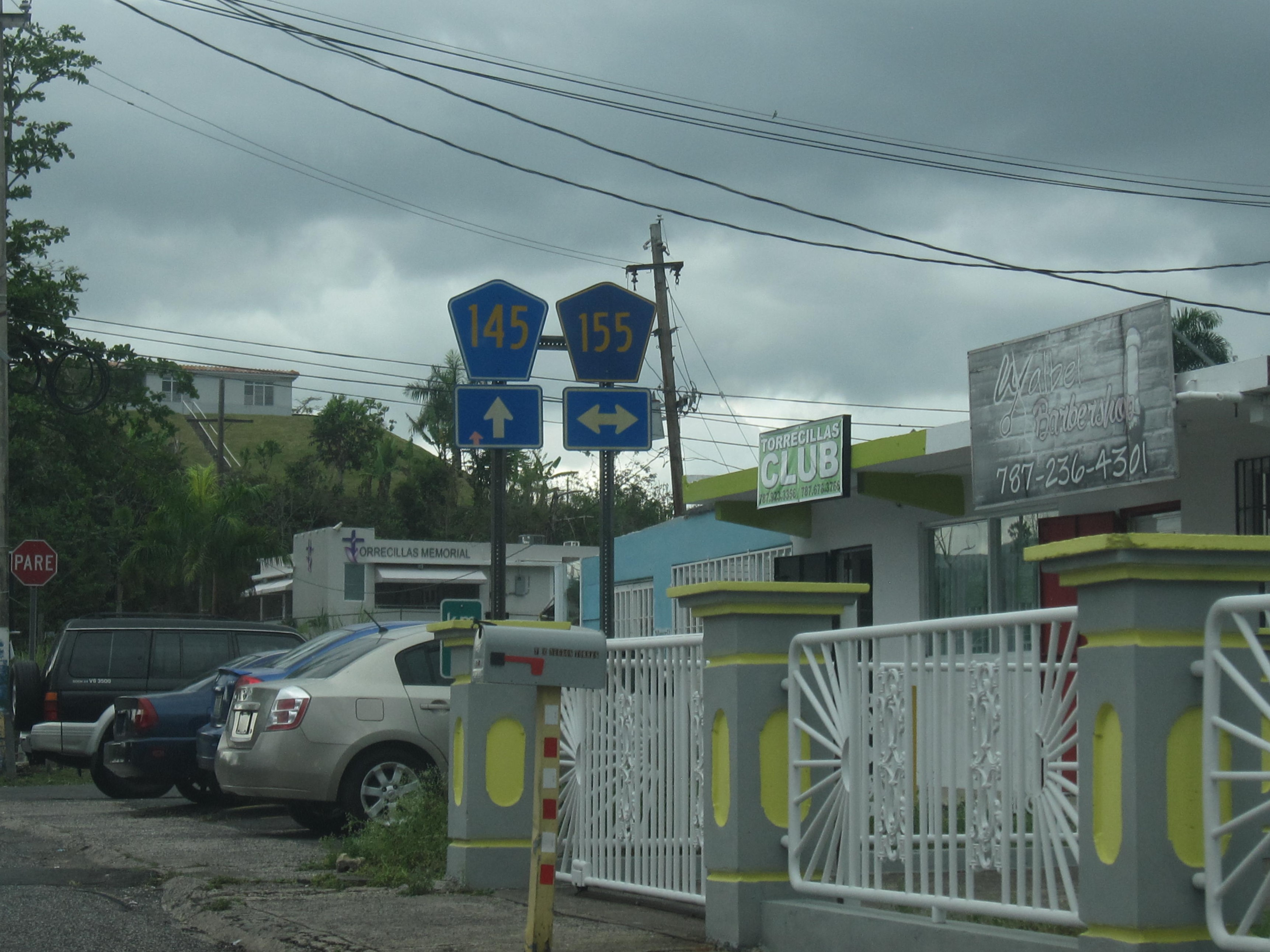
PR-634 south at its junction with PR-145 west and PR-155 in Torrecillas, Morovis

Municipality	Location	km	mi	Destinations	Notes
Ciales	Jaguas	0.0	0.0	PR-146 west – Utuado	Continuation beyond PR-149
Ciales	Jaguas	0.0	0.0	PR-149 – Ciales, Manatí	Western terminus of PR-145 and eastern terminus of PR-146
Ciales	Jaguas	0.7– 0.8	0.43– 0.50	PR-6632 south – Jayuya, Villalba	
Morovis	Torrecillas–Morovis Norte line	6.6– 6.7	4.1– 4.2	PR-567 / PR-6622 (Carretera Licenciado Héctor "Chiqui" Russe Martínez) – Morovis	
Morovis	Morovis Norte–Torrecillas– Fránquez tripoint	7.5	4.7	PR-155 – Morovis, Vega Baja	Eastern terminus of PR-145 and southern terminus of PR-634
Morovis	Morovis Norte–Torrecillas– Fránquez tripoint	7.5	4.7	PR-634	Continuation beyond PR-155
1.000 mi = 1.609 km; 1.000 km = 0.621 mi
