= Cabo Caribe =

Barrio of Vega Baja, Puerto Rico

- Barrio
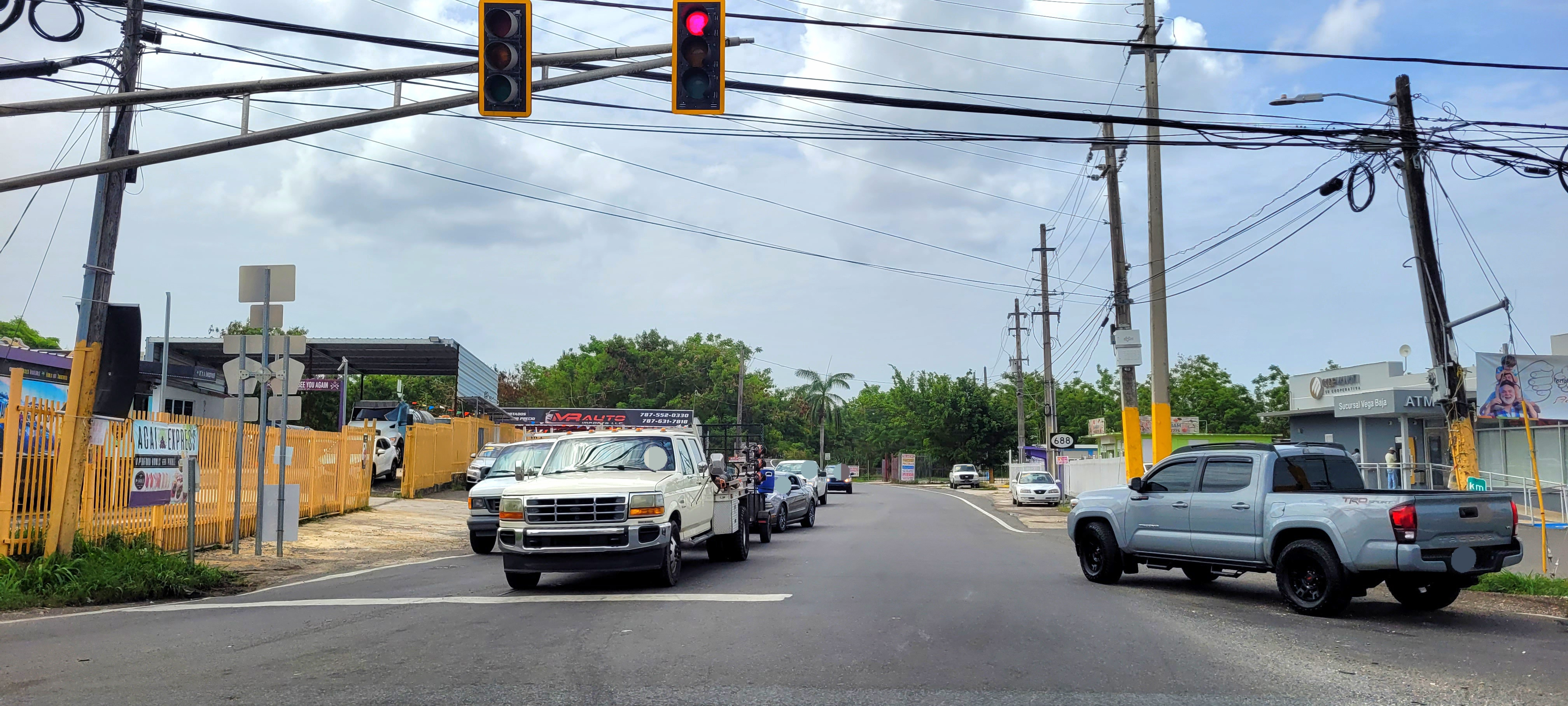
- Puerto Rico Highway 688 in Cabo Caribe

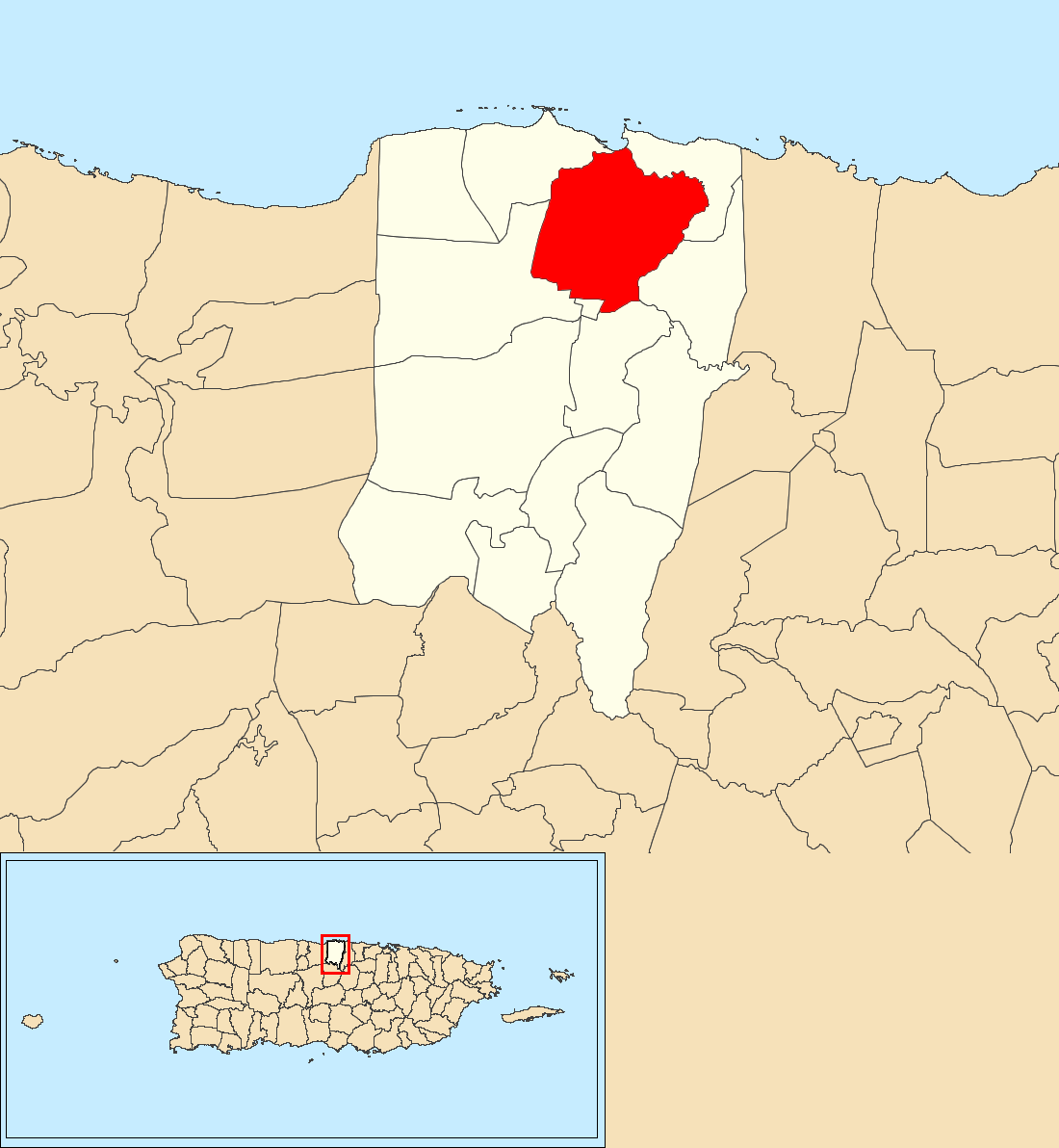
- Location of Cabo Caribe within the municipality of Vega Baja shown in red

- Location of Puerto Rico
- Coordinates: 18°27′52″N 66°22′54″W
- Commonwealth: Puerto Rico
- Municipality: Vega Baja

Area
  - Total: 4.88 sq mi (12.6 km^{2})
  - Land: 4.85 sq mi (12.6 km^{2})
  - Water: 0.03 sq mi (0.078 km^{2})
- Elevation: 0 ft (0 m)

Population (2010)
  - Total: 3,989
  - Density: 820.8/sq mi (316.9/km^{2})
- Source: 2010 Census
- Time zone: UTC−4 (AST)

Cabo Caribe is a barrio in the municipality of Vega Baja, Puerto Rico. Its population in 2010 was 3,989.

== History ==
Cabo Caribe was in Spain's gazetteers until Puerto Rico was ceded by Spain in the aftermath of the Spanish–American War under the terms of the Treaty of Paris of 1898 and became an unincorporated territory of the United States. In 1899, the United States Department of War conducted a census of Puerto Rico finding that the population of Cabo Caribe barrio was 277.

Historical population
Census	Pop.	Note	%±
1900	277		—
1910	310		11.9%
1920	400		29.0%
1930	483		20.8%
1940	496		2.7%
1950	576		16.1%
1960	1,488		158.3%
1970	0		−100.0%
1980	5,296		—
1990	4,901		−7.5%
2000	4,581		−6.5%
2010	3,989		−12.9%
U.S. Decennial Census; 1899 (shown as 1900) 1910-1930; 1930-1950 1960 1980-2000 2010

== Gallery ==
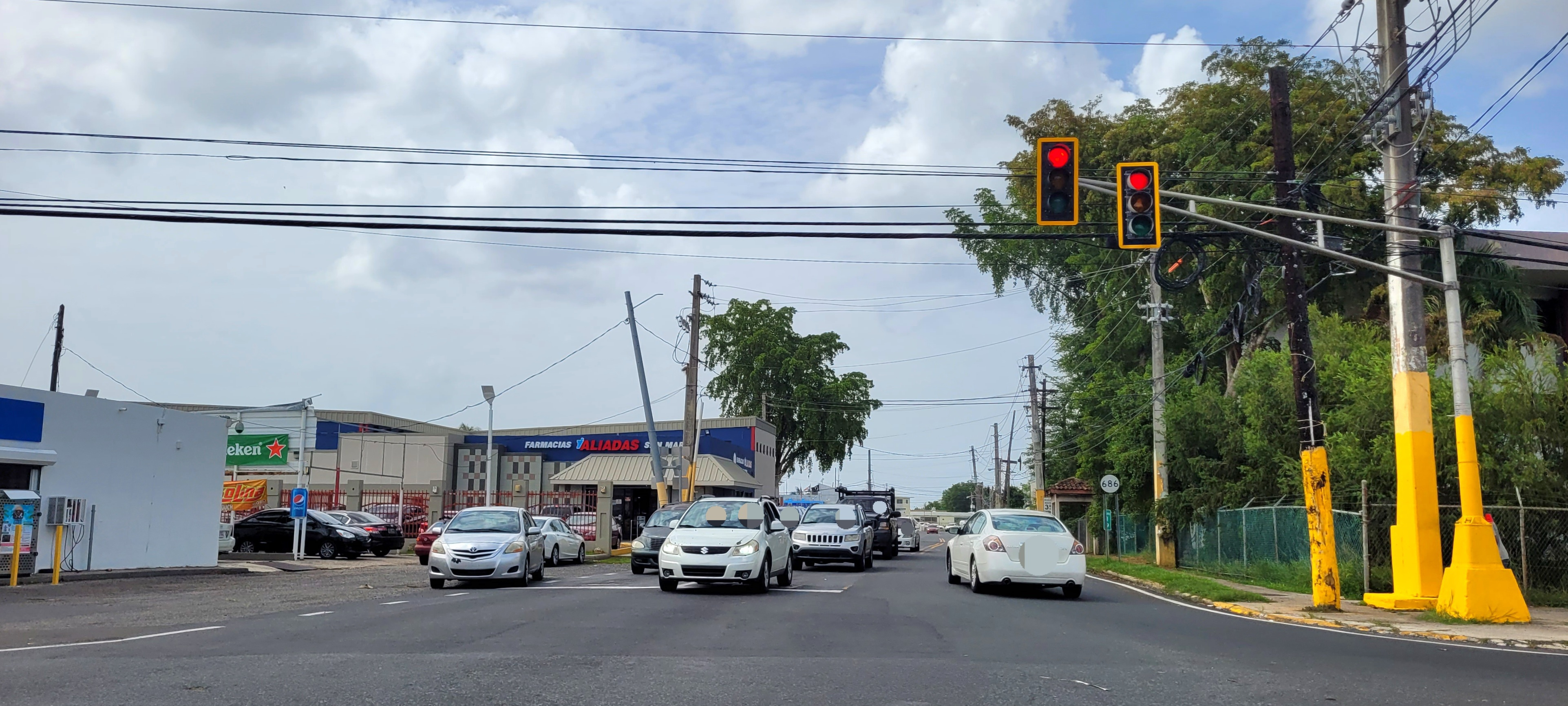
Puerto Rico Highway 686 in Cabo Caribe

== See also ==
- List of communities in Puerto Rico
