= Barahona, Morovis, Puerto Rico =

Barrio of Puerto Rico

Barahona
- Barrio
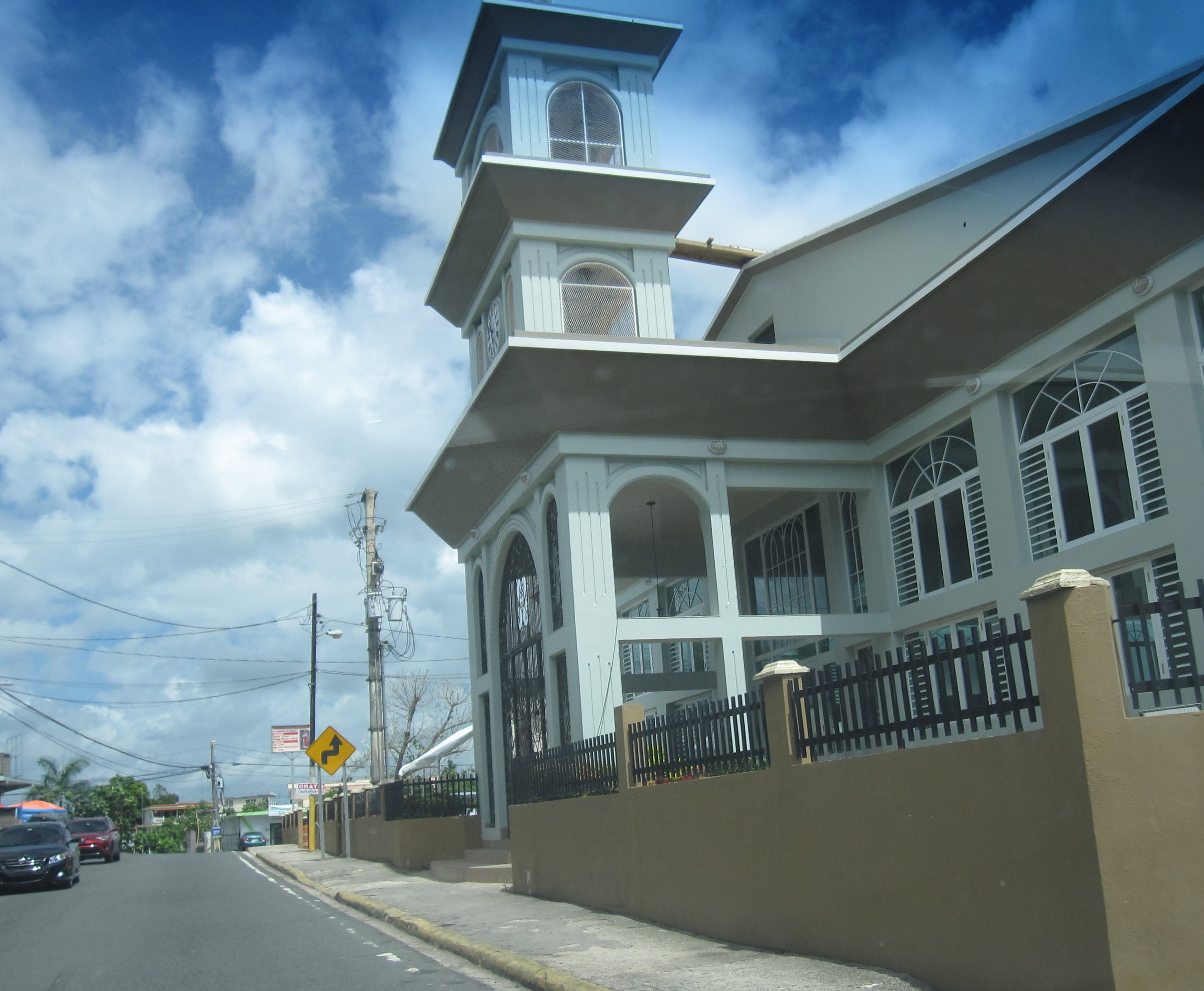
- Building in Barahona

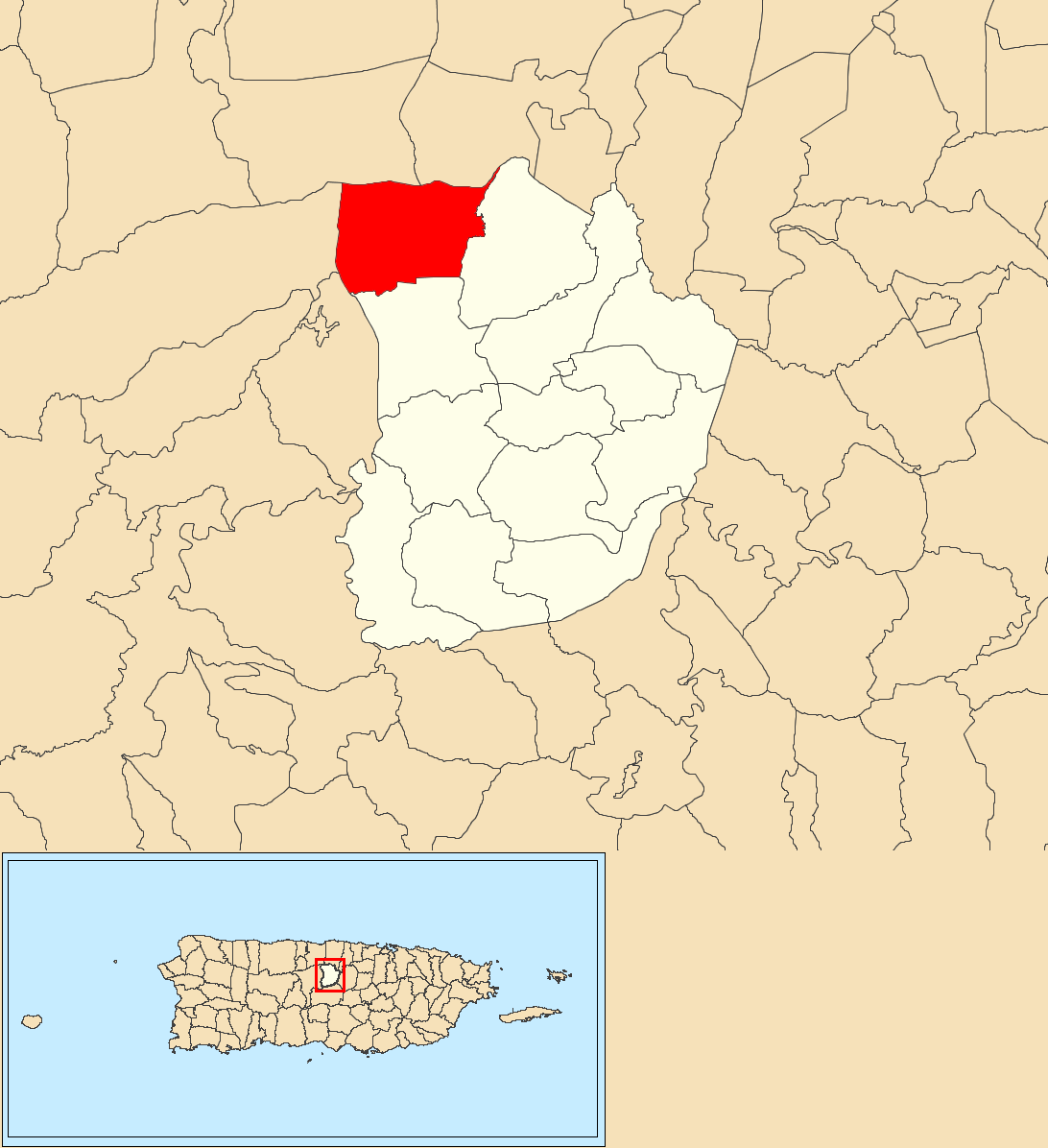
- Location of Barahona within the municipality of Morovis shown in red

- Location of Puerto Rico
- Coordinates: 18°21′43″N 66°26′50″W
- Commonwealth: Puerto Rico
- Municipality: Morovis

Area
  - Total: 3.76 sq mi (9.7 km^{2})
  - Land: 3.76 sq mi (9.7 km^{2})
  - Water: 0 sq mi (0 km^{2})
- Elevation: 561 ft (171 m)

Population (2010)
  - Total: 5,244
  - Density: 1,398.4/sq mi (539.9/km^{2})
- Source: 2010 Census
- Time zone: UTC−4 (AST)
- Zip code: 00687

Barahona is a barrio in the municipality of Morovis, Puerto Rico. Barahona has thirteen sectors and its population in 2010 was 5,244.

== History ==
Barahona was in Spain's gazetteers until Puerto Rico was ceded by Spain in the aftermath of the Spanish–American War under the terms of the Treaty of Paris of 1898 and became an unincorporated territory of the United States. In 1899, the United States Department of War conducted a census of Puerto Rico finding that the population of Barahona barrio was 854.

Historical population
Census	Pop.	Note	%±
1900	854		—
1910	1,024		19.9%
1920	1,357		32.5%
1930	1,503		10.8%
1940	1,430		−4.9%
1950	1,899		32.8%
1960	1,660		−12.6%
1970	2,035		22.6%
1980	2,914		43.2%
1990	3,814		30.9%
2000	4,410		15.6%
2010	5,244		18.9%
U.S. Decennial Census; 1899 (shown as 1900) 1910-1930; 1930-1950 1980-2000 2010

After Hurricane Maria destroyed critical infrastructure in Puerto Rico on September 20, 2017, the Puerto Rico National Guard was tasked with providing people with potable water.

== Sectors ==
Barrios (which are, in contemporary times, roughly comparable to minor civil divisions) in turn are further subdivided into smaller local populated place areas/units called sectores (sectors in English). The types of sectores may vary, from normally sector to urbanización to reparto to barriada to residencial, among others.

The following sectors are in Barahona barrio:

Carretera 633, Parcelas Barahona, Sector Cabachuelas I, Sector Germán Vega, Sector La Lomita, Sector Los Currás, Sector Siete Cuerdas, Sector VilLa Roca, Urbanización Brisas de Barahona, Urbanización Hacienda Las Marías, Urbanización Reparto Los Torres, Urbanización Valle San Luis, and Valle Barahona.

== Education ==
Barrahona is home to the Ángel G. Quintero Middle School (Escuela Intermedia Ángel G. Quintero).

== Gallery ==
Scenes in Barahona, Morovis

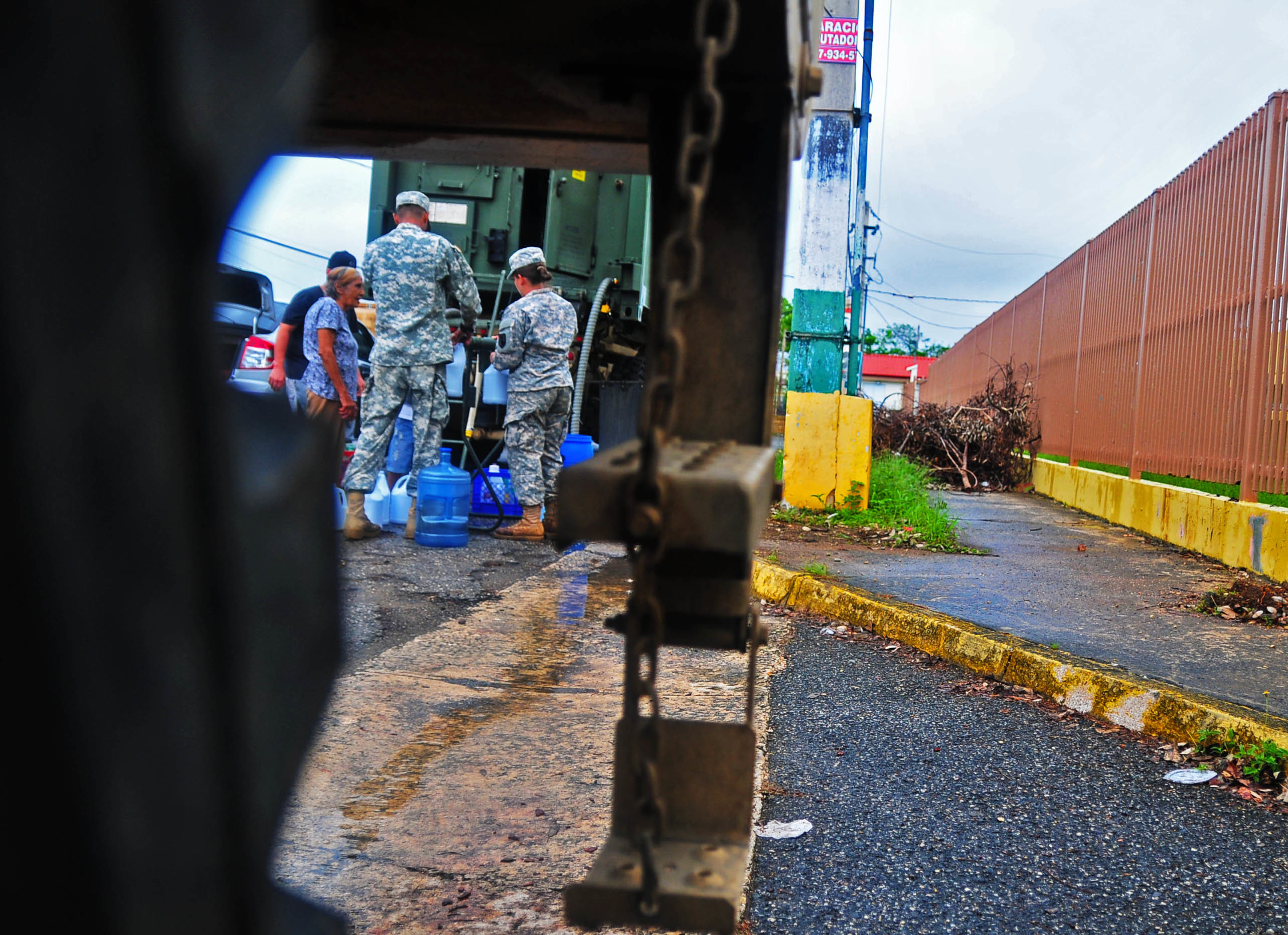
Puerto Rico National Guard with water trucks

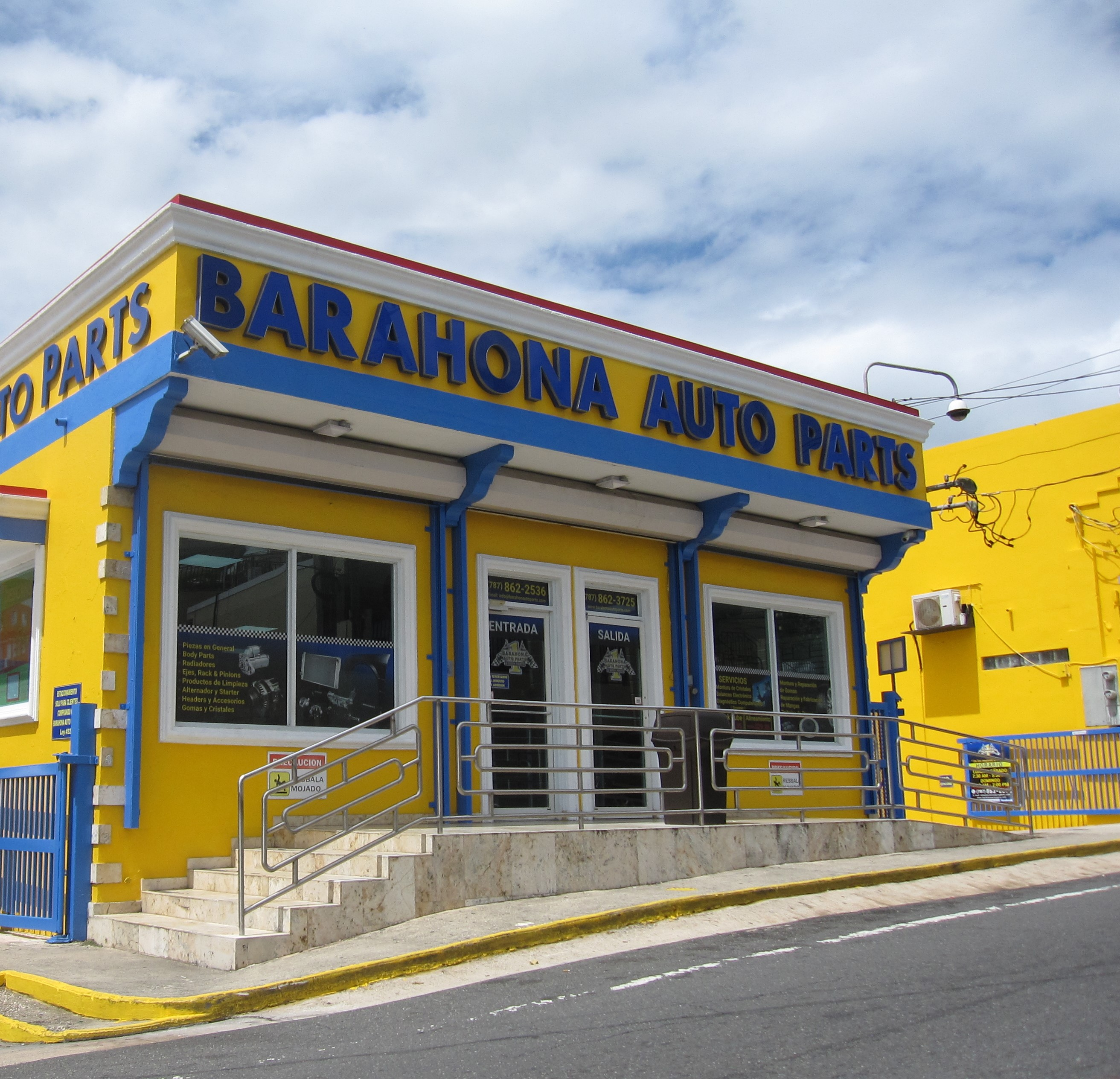
Barahona Auto Parts

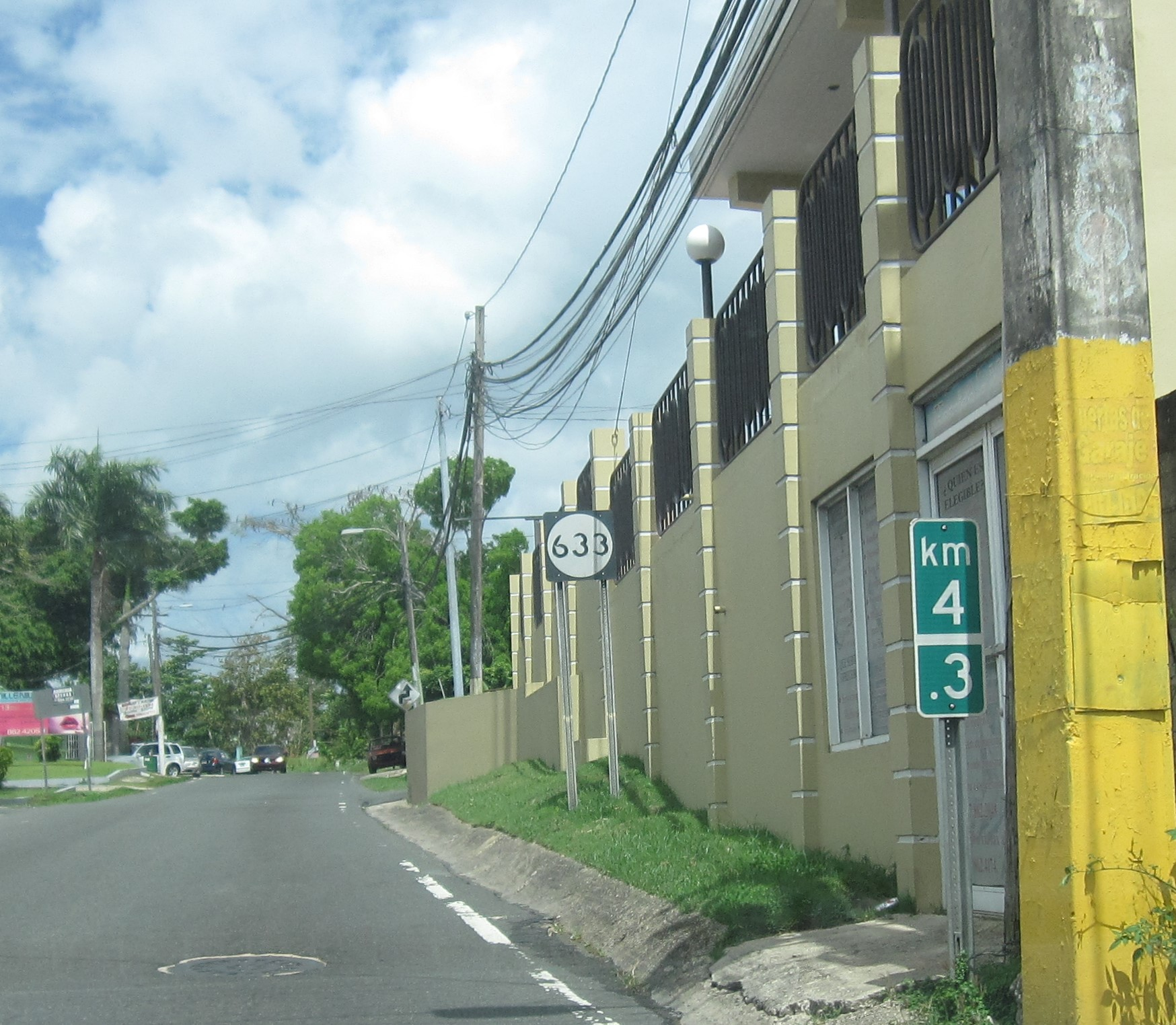
Puerto Rico Highway 633

== See also ==
- List of communities in Puerto Rico
