= Torrecillas, Morovis, Puerto Rico =

Barrio of Puerto Rico

Torrecillas
- Barrio
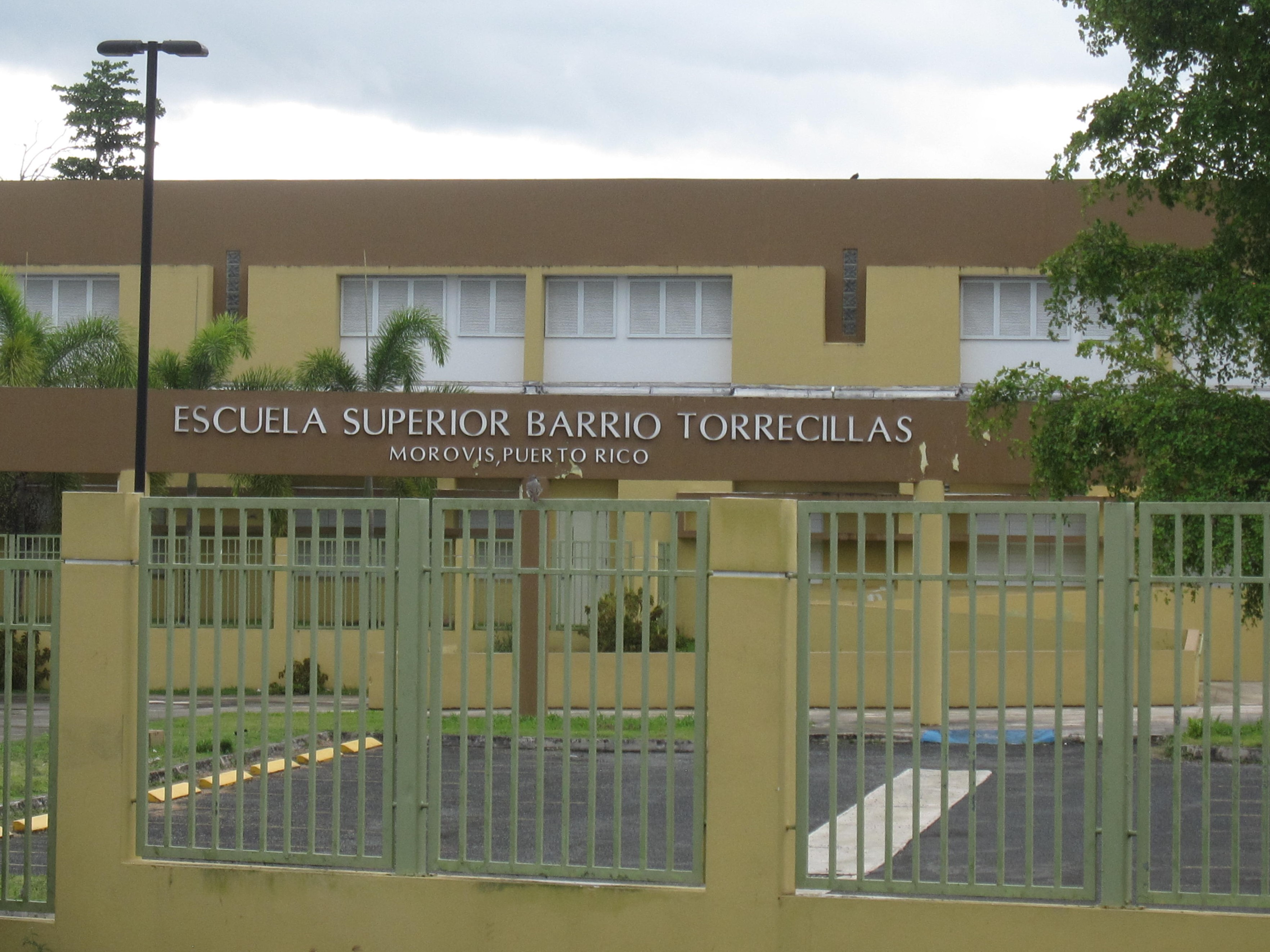
- High school in Torrecillas

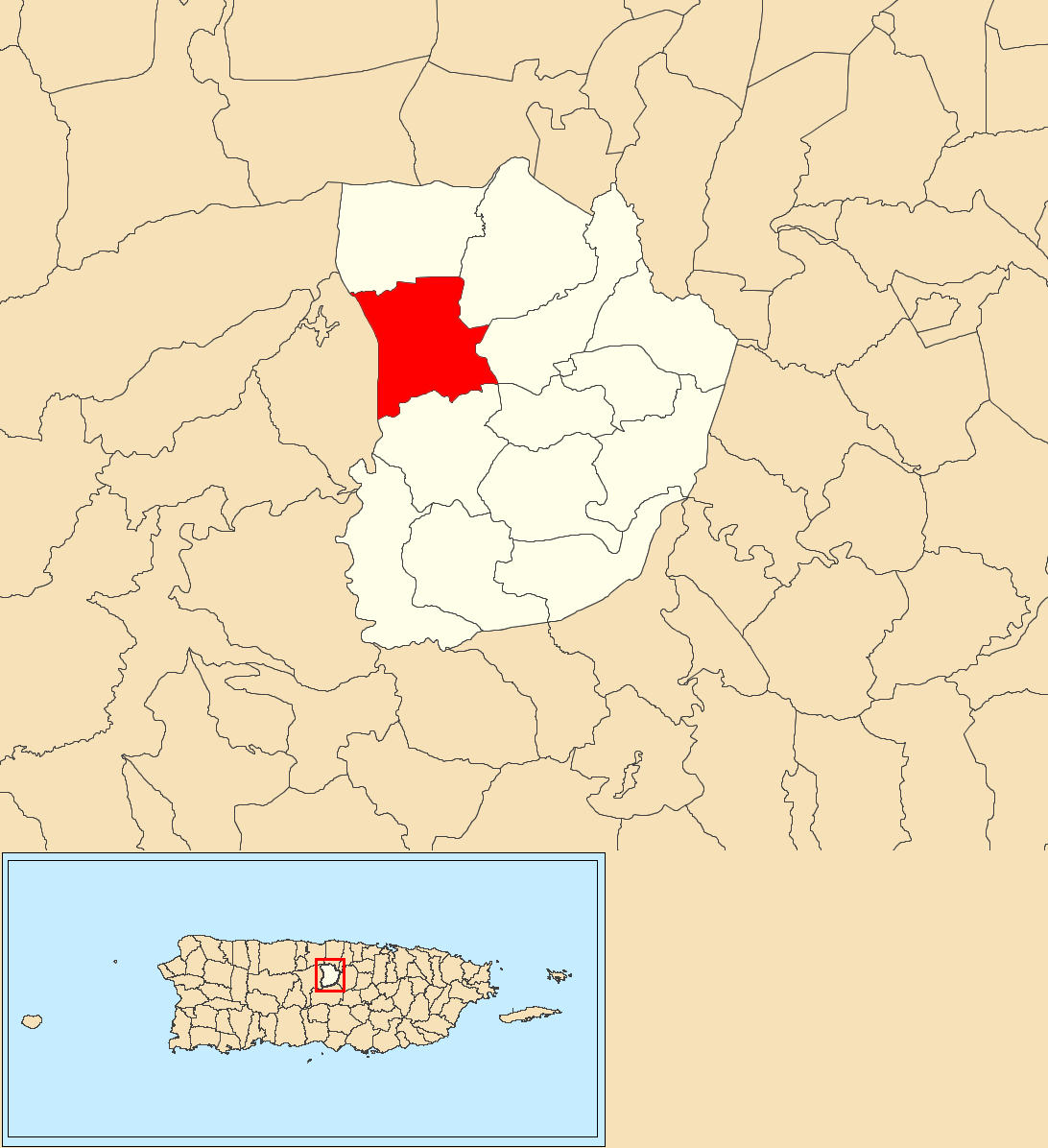
- Location of Torrecillas within the municipality of Morovis shown in red

- Location of Puerto Rico
- Coordinates: 18°19′54″N 66°26′43″W
- Commonwealth: Puerto Rico
- Municipality: Morovis

Area
  - Total: 3.35 sq mi (8.7 km^{2})
  - Land: 3.35 sq mi (8.7 km^{2})
  - Water: 0 sq mi (0 km^{2})
- Elevation: 646 ft (197 m)

Population (2010)
  - Total: 623
  - Density: 186/sq mi (72/km^{2})
- Source: 2010 Census
- Time zone: UTC−4 (AST)
- Zip code: 00687

Torrecillas is a barrio in the municipality of Morovis, Puerto Rico. Torrecillas has eight sectors and its population in 2010 was 623. A USDA Rural Development field office is located in Torrecillas.

== History ==
Torrecillas was in Spain's gazetteers until Puerto Rico was ceded by Spain in the aftermath of the Spanish–American War under the terms of the Treaty of Paris of 1898 and became an unincorporated territory of the United States. In 1899, the United States Department of War conducted a census of Puerto Rico finding that the population of Torrecillas barrio was 572.

Historical population
Census	Pop.	Note	%±
1900	572		—
1910	567		−0.9%
1920	980		72.8%
1930	1,165		18.9%
1940	1,379		18.4%
1950	1,232		−10.7%
1960	638		−48.2%
1970	374		−41.4%
1980	419		12.0%
1990	621		48.2%
2000	739		19.0%
2010	623		−15.7%
U.S. Decennial Census; 1899 (shown as 1900) 1910-1930; 1930-1950 1980-2000 2010

Hurricane Maria hit on September 20, 2017, and six months later a community, of about 300 residents in Torrecillas, reported their electrical power had not yet been restored.

A USDA Rural Development field office is located on the Torrecillas side of Sector La Línea on PR-6622.

== Sectors ==
Barrios (which are, in contemporary times, roughly comparable to minor civil divisions) in turn are further subdivided into smaller local populated place areas/units called sectores (sectors in English). The types of sectores may vary, from normally sector to urbanización to reparto to barriada to residencial, among others.

The following sectors are in Torrecillas barrio:

Parcelas Extensión Torrecillas, Sector Cabachuelas II, Sector La Cuesta de los Guanos, Sector La Línea, Sector Las Lajas, Sector Ventana, Urbanización La Línea, and Urbanización Tulipanes.

== Gallery ==
Scenes in Torrecillas

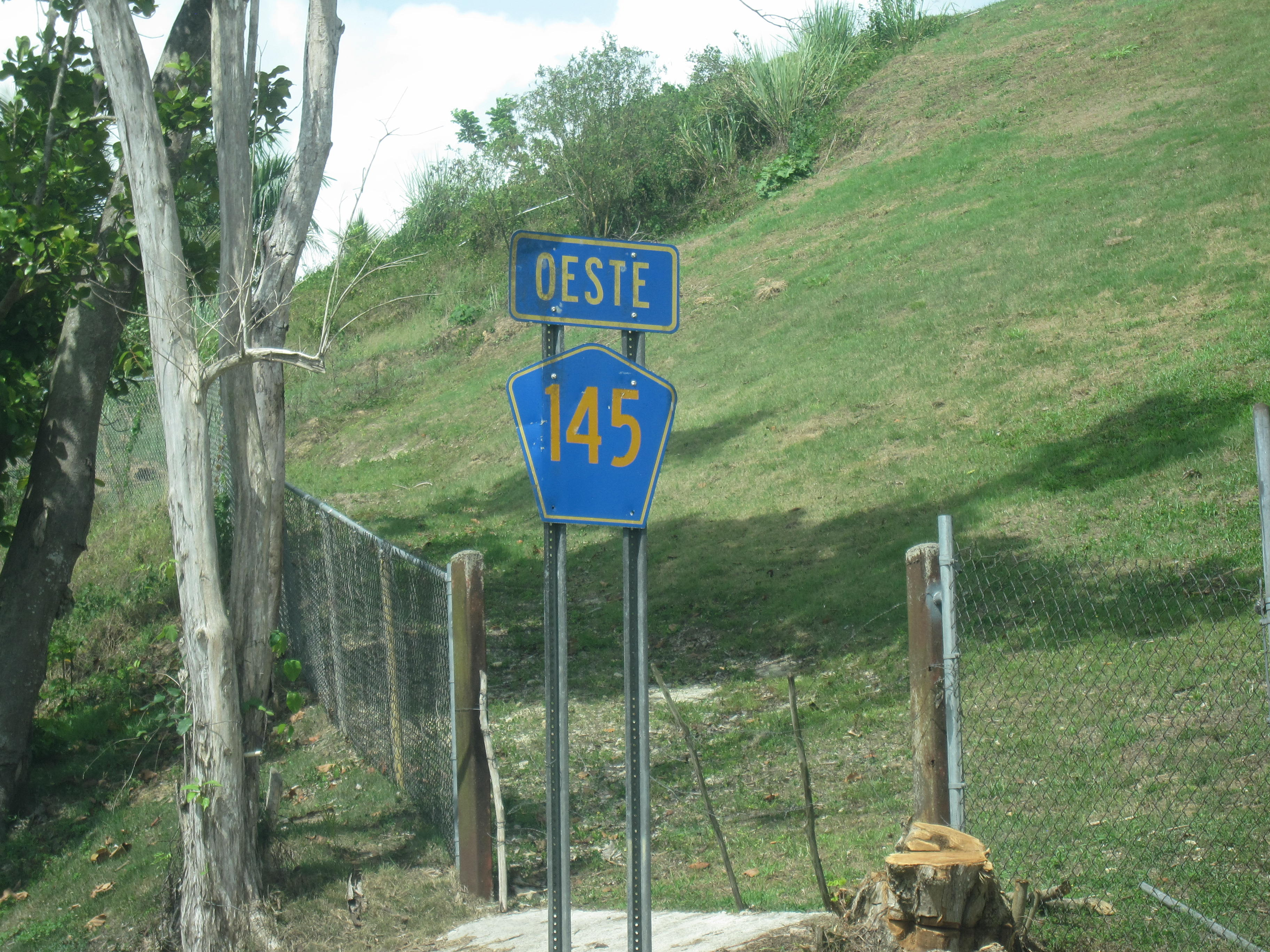
Hillside on PR-145

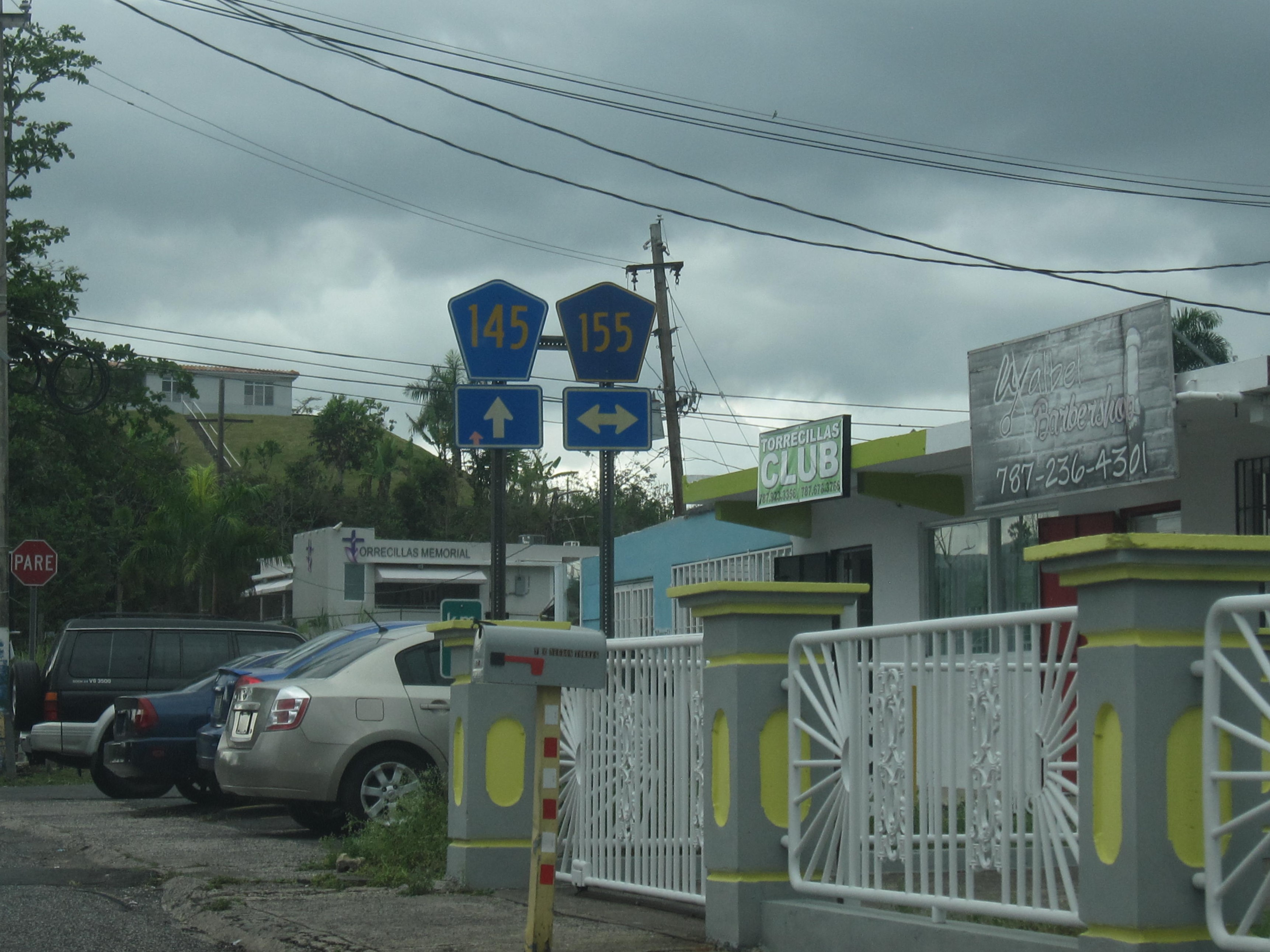
PR-155 and PR-145

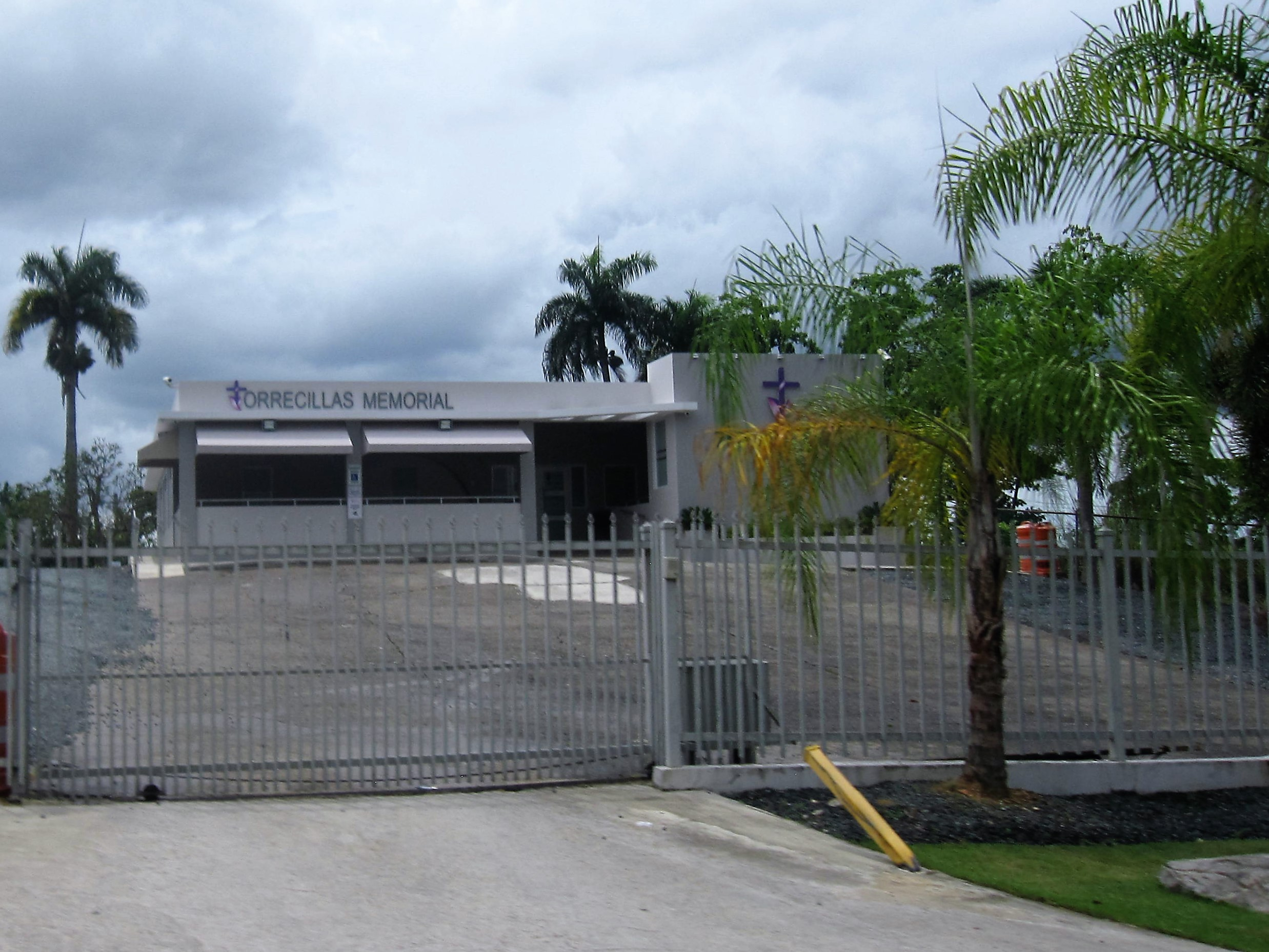
Funeral home in Torrecillas

== See also ==
- List of communities in Puerto Rico
