= Río Grande, Morovis, Puerto Rico =

Barrio of Puerto Rico

Río Grande
- Barrio
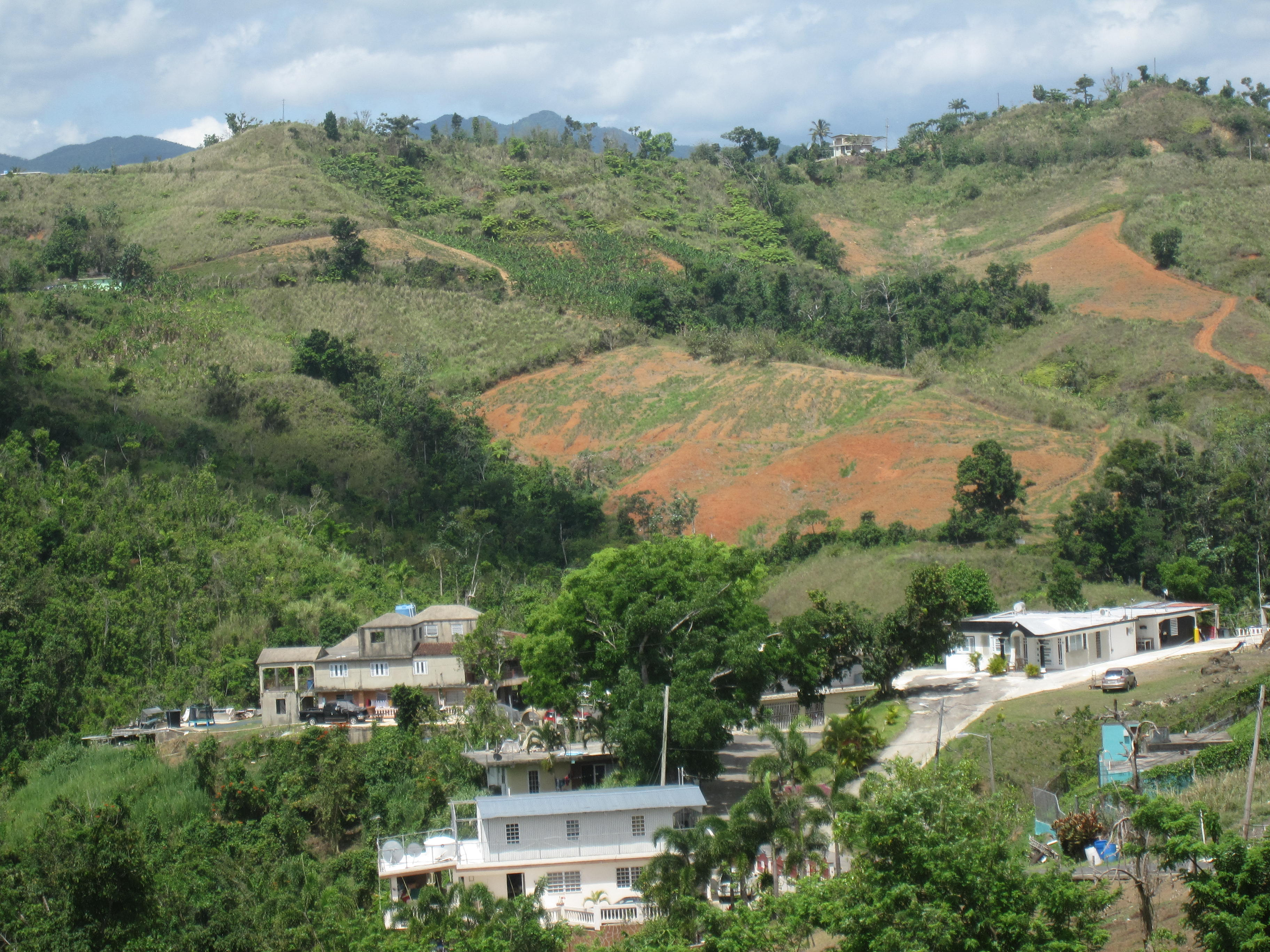
- Río Grande barrio

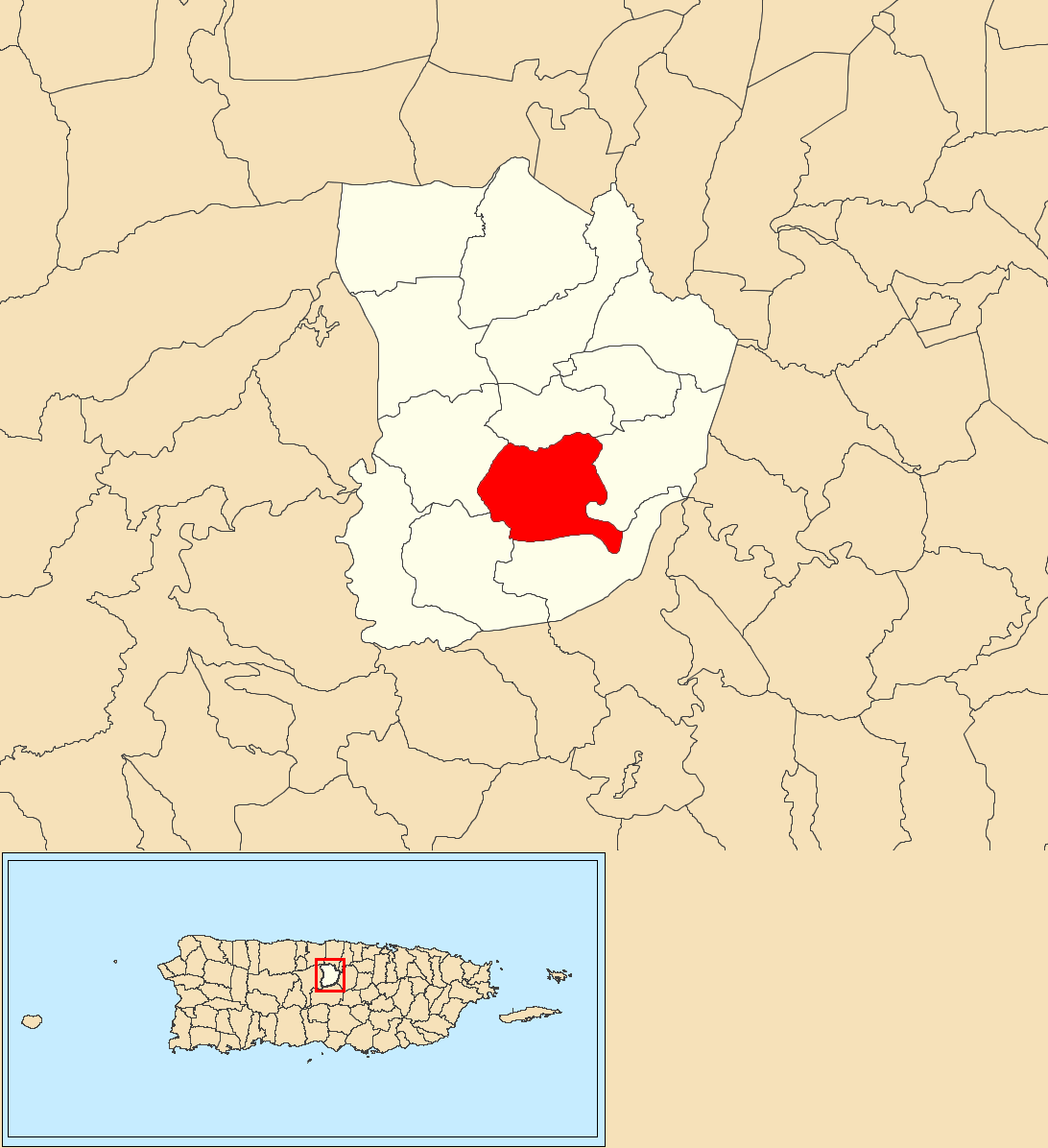
- Location of Río Grande within the municipality of Morovis shown in red

- Location of Puerto Rico
- Coordinates: 18°17′45″N 66°24′38″W
- Commonwealth: Puerto Rico
- Municipality: Morovis

Area
  - Total: 2.95 sq mi (7.6 km^{2})
  - Land: 2.95 sq mi (7.6 km^{2})
  - Water: 0 sq mi (0 km^{2})
- Elevation: 456 ft (139 m)

Population (2010)
  - Total: 594
  - Density: 201.4/sq mi (77.8/km^{2})
- Source: 2010 Census
- Time zone: UTC−4 (AST)
- ZIP Code: 00687

Río Grande is a barrio in the municipality of Morovis, Puerto Rico. Río Grande has six sectors and its population in 2010 was 594.

== History ==
Río Grande was in Spain's gazetteers until Puerto Rico was ceded by Spain in the aftermath of the Spanish–American War under the terms of the Treaty of Paris of 1898 and became an unincorporated territory of the United States. In 1899, the United States Department of War conducted a census of Puerto Rico finding that the population of Río Grande barrio was 841.

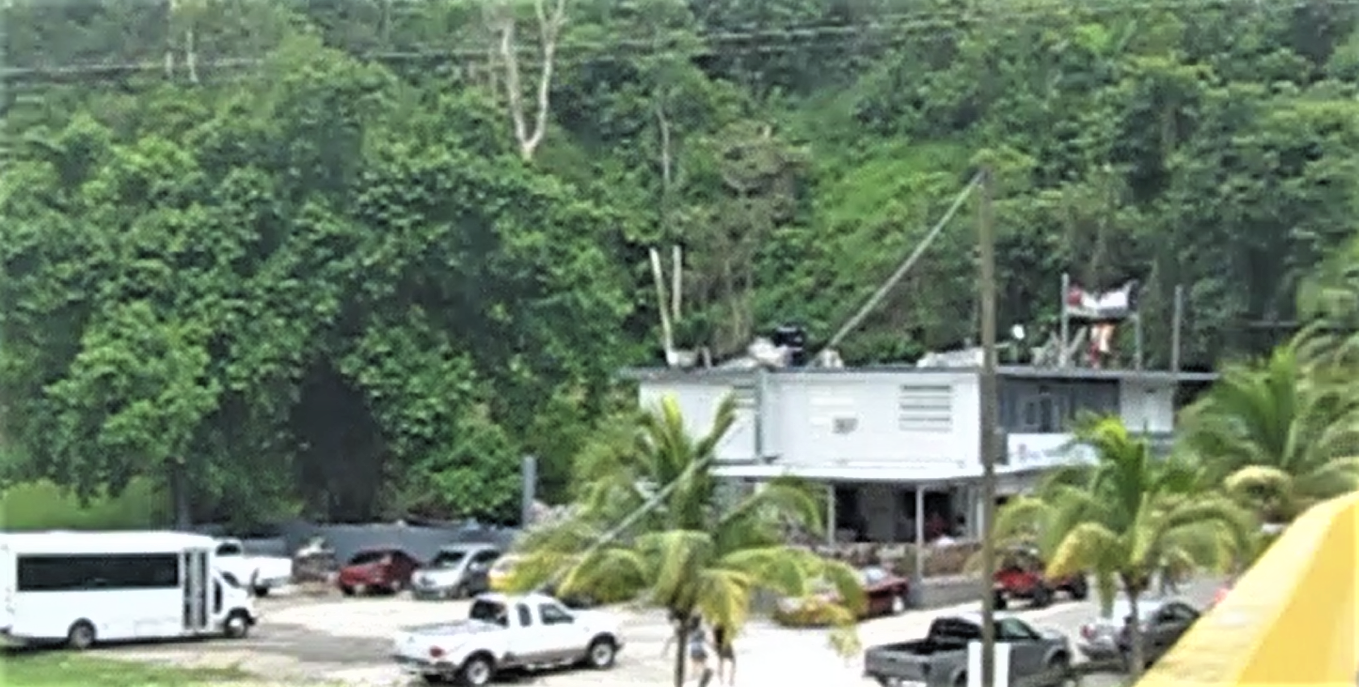
La Playita Restaurant in Río Grande barrio in Morovis

Río Grande was flooded when Hurricane Maria struck on September 20, 2017. The Río Grande River destroyed many homes and came up as high as 2 feet under La Playita restaurant, which is a restaurant on stilts. The people in the community were left isolated and without power.

Historical population
Census	Pop.	Note	%±
1900	841		—
1910	936		11.3%
1920	911		−2.7%
1930	1,019		11.9%
1940	1,210		18.7%
1950	1,187		−1.9%
1960	967		−18.5%
1970	657		−32.1%
1980	592		−9.9%
1990	535		−9.6%
2000	645		20.6%
2010	594		−7.9%
U.S. Decennial Census; 1899 (shown as 1900) 1910-1930; 1930-1950 1980-2000 2010

== Sectors ==
Barrios (which are, in contemporary times, roughly comparable to minor civil divisions) in turn are further subdivided into smaller local populated place areas/units called sectores (sectors in English). The types of sectores may vary, from normally sector to urbanización to reparto to barriada to residencial, among others.

The following sectors are in Río Grande barrio:

Sector Delgado, Sector El Cerro, Sector Fontán, Sector La Playita, Sector Los Quendo, and Tramo Carretera 155.

== Gallery ==
Scenes around Río Grande, Morovis

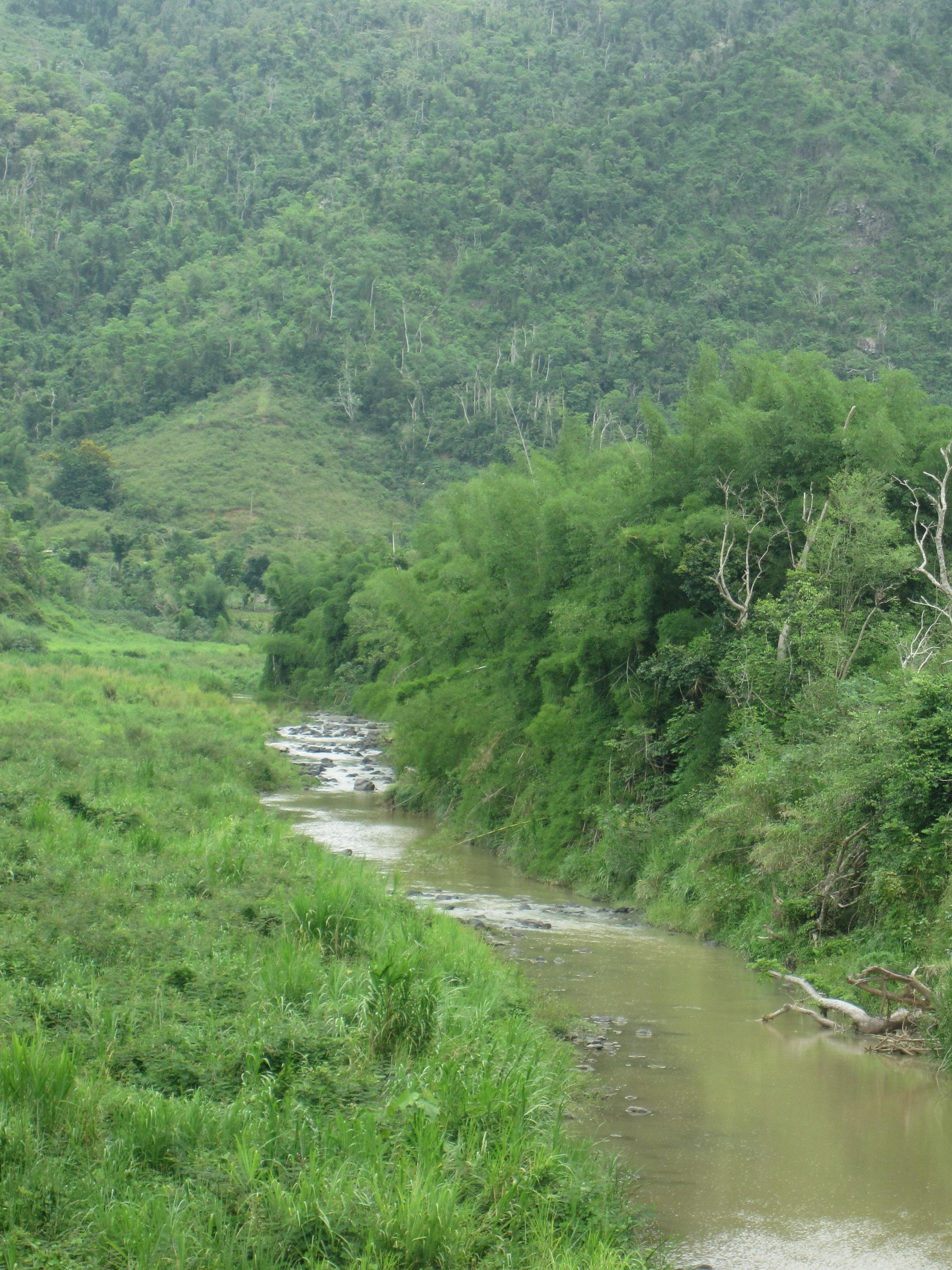
View from bridge in Sector La Playita

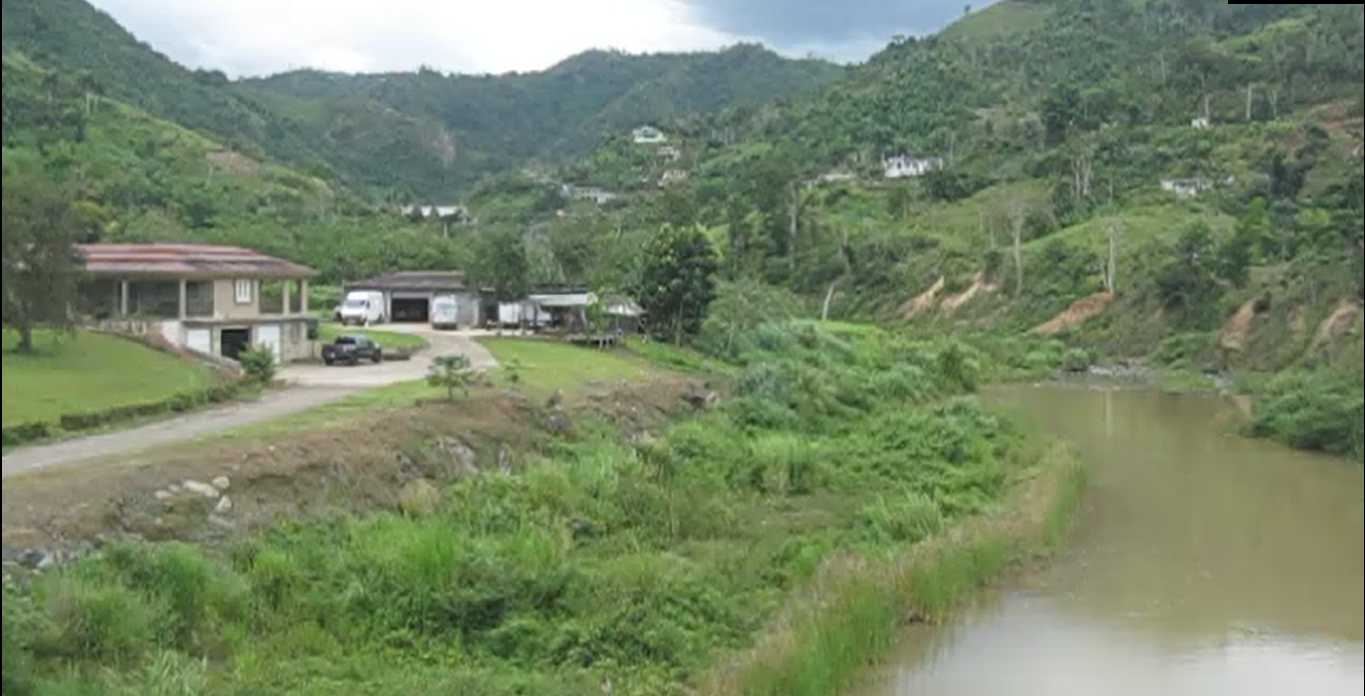
Sector La Playita

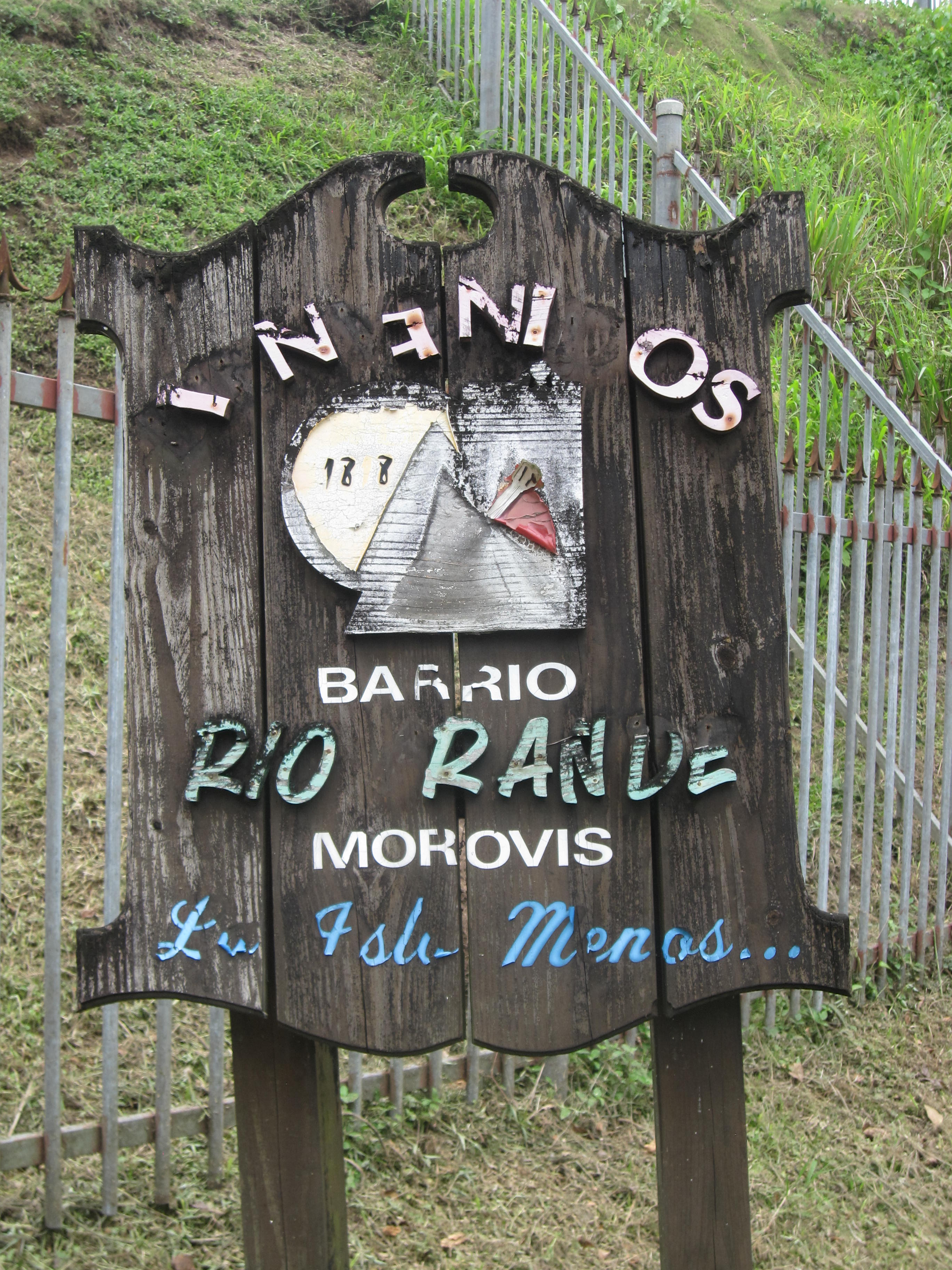
Río Grande sign on PR-155

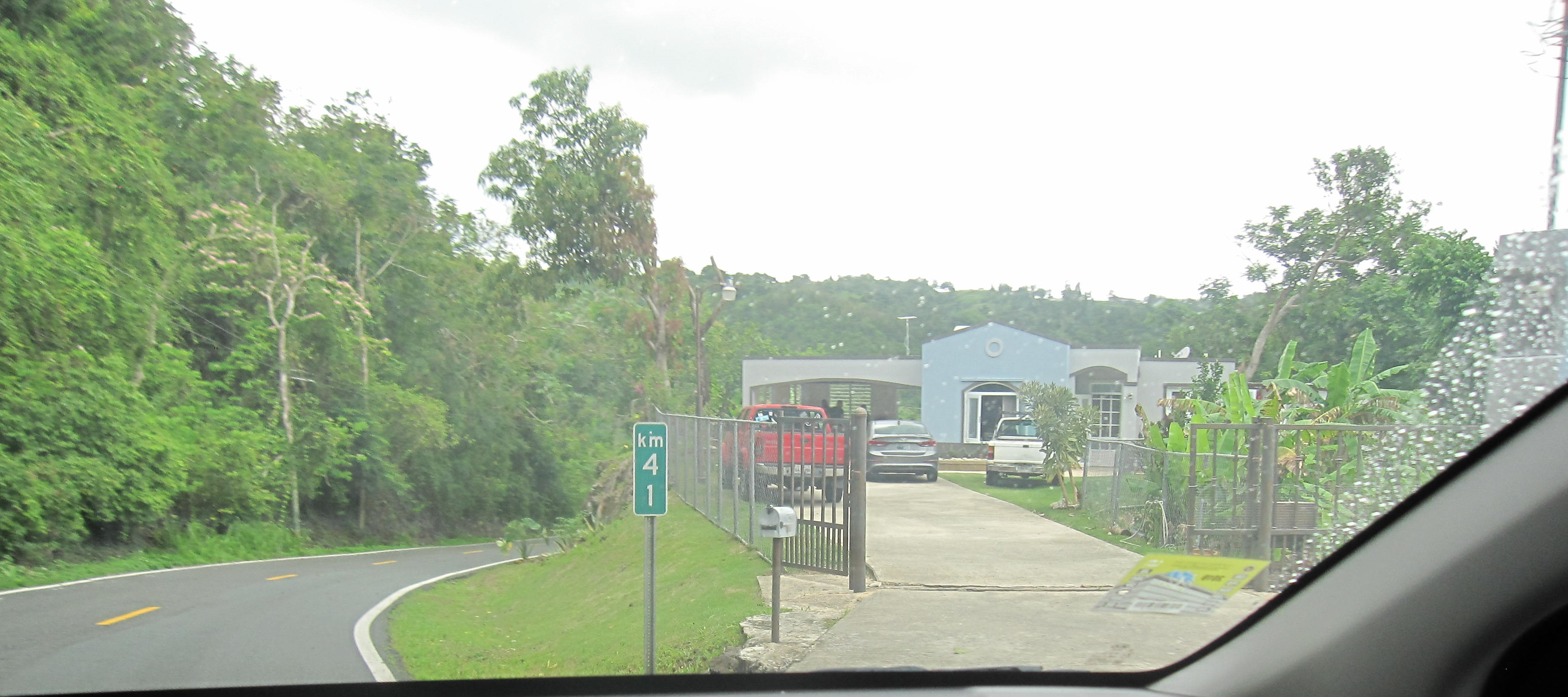
PR-155 at km 41 southbound towards Orocovis

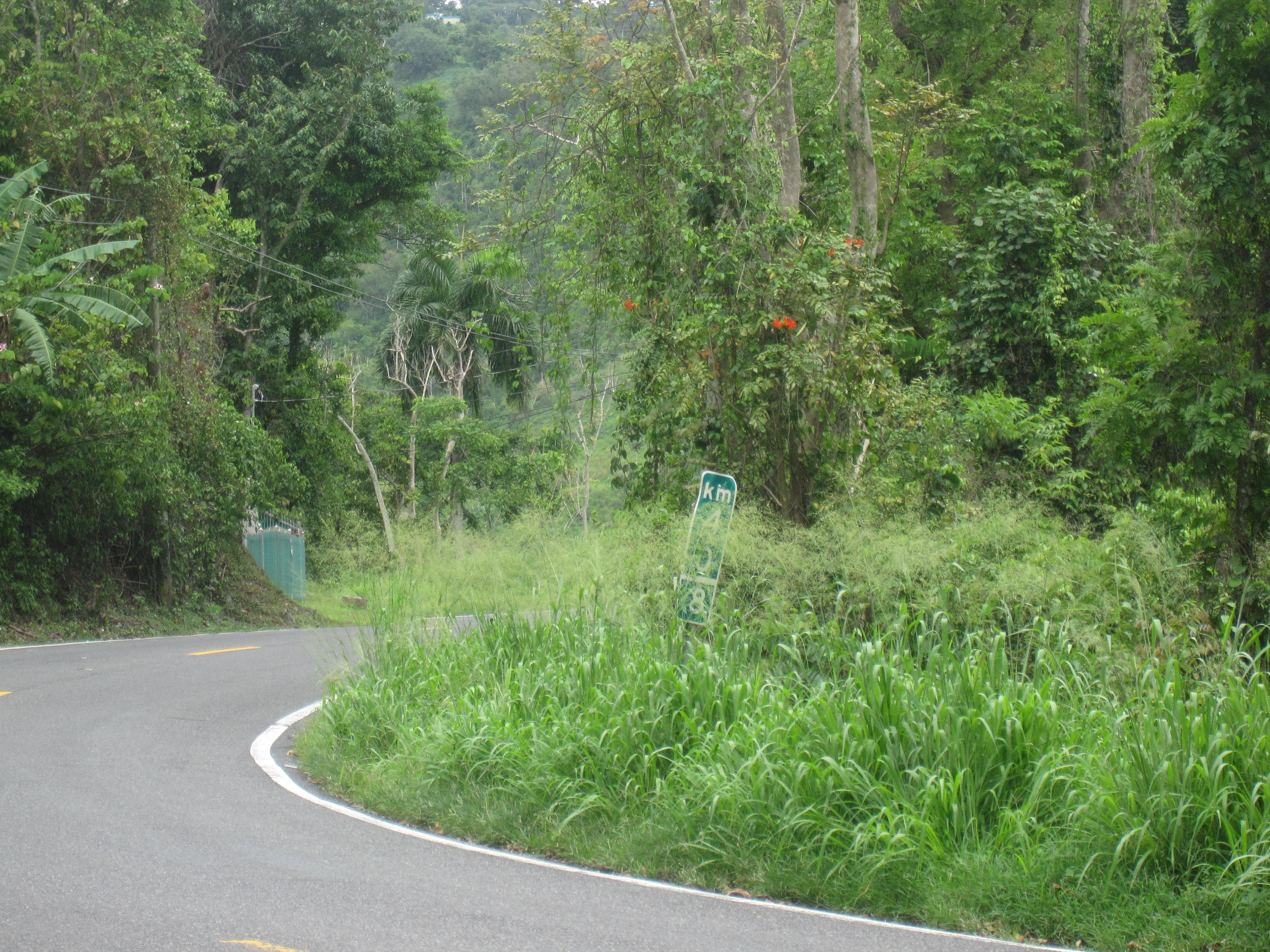
PR-155 at km 40.8 southbound approaching Orocovis

== See also ==
- List of communities in Puerto Rico
