= Botijas River =

River of Puerto Rico

Coordinates: 18.2391222°N 66.3793367°W

- Native name: Río Botijas (Spanish)

Location
- Commonwealth: Puerto Rico
- Municipality: Orocovis

Physical characteristics
- Source
  - location: Cordillera Central in Palo Hincado, Barranquitas
- Mouth
  - location: Orocovis River in Orocovis, Orocovis
  - elevation: 1467 ft

Basin features
- Tributaries
  - right: Cañabón River

The Botijas River (Spanish: Río Botijas) is a tributary of the Orocovis River, located in the municipalities of Orocovis and Barranquitas, Puerto Rico. The river has its source in the northward slopes of the Cordillera Central in the Palo Hincado barrio of Barranquitas, and flows northwestwardly into the Orocovis River, close to Orocovis Pueblo.

== See also ==
- List of rivers of Puerto Rico
