= Cañabón River =

River of Puerto Rico

Coordinates: 18.2324558°N 66.3651699°W

- Native name: Río Cañabón (Spanish)

Location
- Commonwealth: Puerto Rico
- Municipality: Orocovis

Physical characteristics
- Source
  - location: Cordillera Central in Cañabón, Barranquitas
- Mouth
  - location: Botijas River in Botijas, Orocovis
  - elevation: 1568 ft.

The Cañabón River (Spanish: Río Cañabón) is a tributary of the Botijas River that flows through the municipalities of Orocovis and Barranquitas in Puerto Rico. It has its source in barrio Cañabón of Barranquitas and empties into the Botijas in the barrio of the same name in Orocovis.

== See also ==
- List of rivers of Puerto Rico
