= Jesús Colón Berlingeri =

Puerto Rican politician

Mayor of Orocovis
- Incumbent
- Assumed office 1998
- Preceded by: Jesús Colón Collazo

Personal details
- Born: April 27, 1965 (age 61) Orocovis, Puerto Rico
- Party: New Progressive Party (PNP)
- Spouse: Liza Otero Chéverez
- Children: Francisco Jesús Colón Piñeiro, Edgardo Aurelio Colón Piñeiro, Sebastián Edgardo Colón Otero
- Education: University of Puerto Rico at Cayey (BSS); Penn State University (MS)

Jesús Edgardo Colón Berlingeri, also known as "Gardy", is a Puerto Rican politician and the current mayor of Orocovis. Colón is affiliated with the New Progressive Party (PNP) and has served as mayor since the death of his predecessor and father, Jesús Colón Collazo, in 1998, who died in office of a massive heart attack. Colón was then officially elected by the people in 2000. In 1982 starts courses College in the University of Puerto Rico at Cayey graduating is in 1987 with Bachelor in Social science and a Masters from Penn State University. From 1988 to 1996 was noted for his service to minority communities in various jobs from teacher in Chester, Pennsylvania school district, counselor to director of the Hispanic Program for Academic Progress at the Pennsylvania State University. In 1988 he married Odette Piñeiro, Puerto Rico's former Secretary of Education and fellow Penn State alumni, from whom he is separated. They have three sons.

== Personal life ==
Colón was born in Saltos barrio, Orocovis, Puerto Rico and was the second oldest in a family of 7 siblings.

== Career ==
Colón served as a delegate to several Democratic National Conventions and campaigned actively for Hillary Clinton prior to Puerto Rico's 2008 Democratic presidential primary.
