= Andrés Jiménez =

Andrés Jiménez may refer to:

- Andrés Jiménez (basketball) (born 1962), former Spanish basketball player
- Andrés Jiménez (BMX rider) (born 1986), Colombian racing cyclist
- Andrés Jiménez (singer) (born 1947), composer and singer of traditional Puerto Rican folk music
- Andrés Jiménez (soccer) (born 2000), American soccer player of Colombian descent

== See also ==
- Andrés Giménez (born 1998), Venezuelan baseball player
