= Sabana, Orocovis, Puerto Rico =

Barrio of Puerto Rico

Sabana
- Barrio
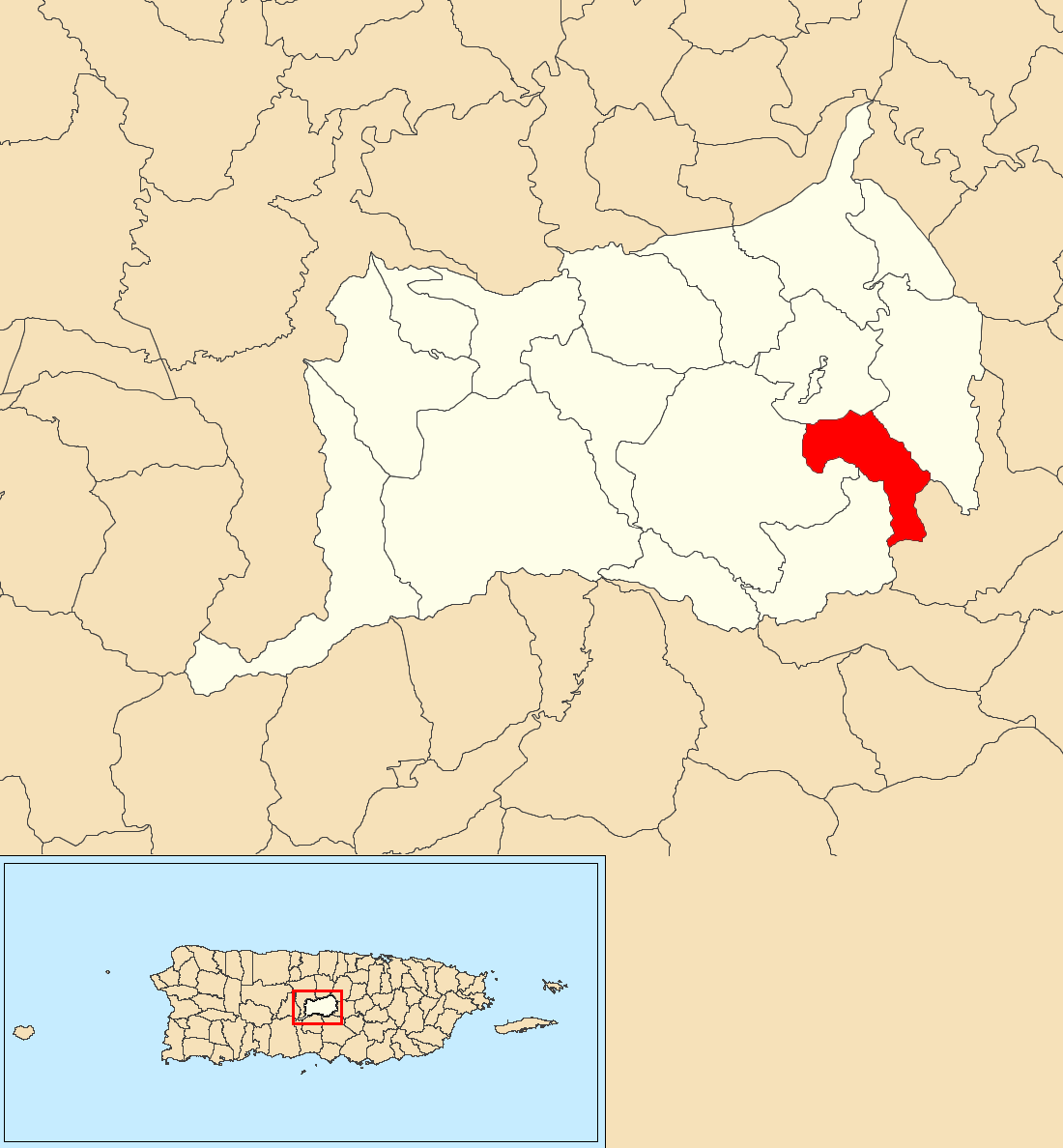
- Location of Sabana within the municipality of Orocovis shown in red

- Location of Puerto Rico
- Coordinates: 18°12′16″N 66°22′45″W
- Commonwealth: Puerto Rico
- Municipality: Orocovis

Area
  - Total: 1.99 sq mi (5.2 km^{2})
  - Land: 1.99 sq mi (5.2 km^{2})
  - Water: 0 sq mi (0 km^{2})
- Elevation: 2,612 ft (796 m)

Population (2010)
  - Total: 976
  - Density: 490.5/sq mi (189.4/km^{2})
- Source: 2010 Census
- Time zone: UTC−4 (AST)
- ZIP Code: 00720
- Area code: 787/939

Sabana is a barrio in the municipality of Orocovis, Puerto Rico. Its population in 2010 was 976.

== Sectors ==
Barrios (which are, in contemporary times, roughly comparable to minor civil divisions) in turn are further subdivided into smaller local populated place areas/units called sectores (sectors in English). The types of sectores may vary, from normally sector to urbanización to reparto to barriada to residencial, among others.

The following sectors are in Sabana barrio:

Sector Chu Vázquez, Sector Cruce de Mayo, Sector El Árbol Taíno, Sector La Cuesta, Sector La Pista, Sector La Planta de Gas, Sector La Vega, Sector Los Cintrón, Sector Los Figueroa, Sector Los Mateo, Sector Los Meléndez, Sector Los Negrón, Sector Los Padilla, Sector Los Rosado, and Sector Sabana Arriba.

== History ==
Sabana was in Spain's gazetteers until Puerto Rico was ceded by Spain in the aftermath of the Spanish–American War under the terms of the Treaty of Paris of 1898 and became an unincorporated territory of the United States. In 1899, the United States Department of War conducted a census of Puerto Rico finding that the combined population of Sabana and Mata de Cañas barrios was 1,089.

Historical population
Census	Pop.	Note	%±
1910	708		—
1920	848		19.8%
1930	737		−13.1%
1940	868		17.8%
1950	936		7.8%
1960	557		−40.5%
1970	432		−22.4%
1980	528		22.2%
1990	775		46.8%
2000	1,448		86.8%
2010	976		−32.6%
U.S. Decennial Census; 1900 (N/A) 1910-1930; 1930-1950 1980-2000 2010

== See also ==
- List of communities in Puerto Rico
