= Andrés Jiménez (singer) =

Composer and singer of Puerto Rican folk music

- Also known as: "El Jíbaro"
- Born: Andrés Jiménez Hernández; July 3, 1947 (age 78); Orocovis, Puerto Rico
- Genres: Jíbaro music
- Occupations: Musician, composer
- Instrument: Voice

Andrés Jiménez Hernández, popularly known as "El Jíbaro" (born July 3, 1947 in Orocovis, Puerto Rico), is a composer and singer of traditional Puerto Rican folk music (jíbaro music) and is that music genre's best known contemporary trovador (troubadour, i.e., singer) linked to the Neofolkloric movement of the Nueva Canción (New Song).

== Early life ==
Jiménez was born on July 3, 1947, in Gato, a barrio of Orocovis, Puerto Rico. He is the fourth of fifteen children of Juan Jiménez and Felícita Hernández. His father, a tireless farmer, taught him to love the earth and the cultivated soil passionately. Early on, his mother stirred an interest in singing, particularly by taking him to ceremonies where folk music, like the "seis chorreao" and "aguinaldos," was interpreted.

A desire for a better career opportunities led him to emigrate to New York City where he was drafted into the army. Upon his return, he entered the University of Puerto Rico and went on stage for the first time as part of the Grupo Taoné which had legendary musicians like Roy Brown, Antonio Cabán Vale "El Topo," Noel Hernández, Carlos Lozada, and the duo Pepe y Flora.

== Songs ==
Jiménez wrote "El Puertorriqueño" (The Puerto Rican), a song that describes the Puerto Rican person. Included in the characteristics of a Puerto Rican, in those lyrics are: A Puerto Rican has a dark skin tone, a clear forehead, a languid look, a pale countenance, a proportional nose, is of medium-size, a witty person, free, arrogant, with a restless mind; is human, likeable, just and giving... variable in the affairs of love.

== Local and international performances ==
Jiménez continued to perform with Taoné for several years while developing a unique style that reaffirmed his commitment to Puerto Rico’s culture and Jíbaro music. With Taoné, he traveled to the United States and made presentations at the universities of Harvard, Yale and Princeton, as well as in many Puerto Rican migrant communities in New York City, Chicago, Connecticut, Boston and Los Angeles.

In 1973, he participated in the Youth Festival in Germany. He represented Puerto Rico in the First Latin American Folk Song (Primer Cantar Folclórico de América Latina), held in Cuba. That same year, he toured different Mexican states, sponsored by the National Institute of Fine Arts. In October, along with his new band, he performed at the Festival Homenaje al Trovador (Festival in Tribute to the Troubadour), held in the Plaza Bolívar in Caracas, Venezuela. In November, he received the “Premio Encuentro por Trayectoria Artística" ("The Encounter Award for Artistic Legacy").

== Awards and accolades ==
Jiménez was awarded the Agüeybaná Award twice for Best Performer of traditional Puerto Rican folk music. He has also received awards like the Diplo and the Cacique Orocovix, and has been recognized by various civic and cultural organizations, including the Puerto Rico House of Representatives.

In April 1997, he received the Farándula Award for his album "Los Santos Inocentes ", considered the best Puerto Rican 1996 Christmas album. It earned him the Gold Record Award for the sale of more than fifty thousand units.

A year later the song “Los tecnócratas”, from his album "En la última trinchera", became the anthem of the Puerto Rican labor movement against the privatization of the Puerto Rico Telephone Company.

He has participated in made-for-TV special presentations including "Somos un solo pueblo" ("We are one people") and "Al compás de un sentimiento" ("To the beat of a feeling"), produced by the Banco Popular de Puerto Rico, and the concert "Enciende la estrella de la paz" ("Light the star of peace") in 1998 which was sponsored by the Fundación Nacional para la Cultura Popular.

In 1999, El Jíbaro" also participated another political movement. He joined forces with salsa singer Ismael Miranda to compose the album "Son de Vieques" ("A Tune for Vieques"), and produced the CD "Raíces Puertorriqueñas" ("Puerto Rican Roots"), which features the "Singing Children" of jíbaro music. Both works won awards and were used as rallying cries for the rights of the people of Vieques.

== Recent times ==
In later productions, Jiménez composed “trovas” depicting sacred music themes like “Jesús, Hijo de Dios" ("Jesus, the Son of God”) based on the décimas of artist Luis Germán Cajigas, which were inspired by verses from the Biblical books of Luke, Matthew and Mark. He has also continued with his nationalist leitmotif with albums like “So we are,” “Nacido en Borikén" ("Born in Borikén”) and “Día de gallo pinto" ("Day of gallo pinto”).

Jiménez has also been the producer of the Festival Jíbaro which has hosted some of the most significant Puerto Rican artists.

== See also ==
- List of Puerto Ricans
