= Orocovis barrio-pueblo =

Historical and administrative center (seat) of Orocovis, Puerto Rico

Barrio Pueblo Pueblo de Orocovis
- Municipality Seat
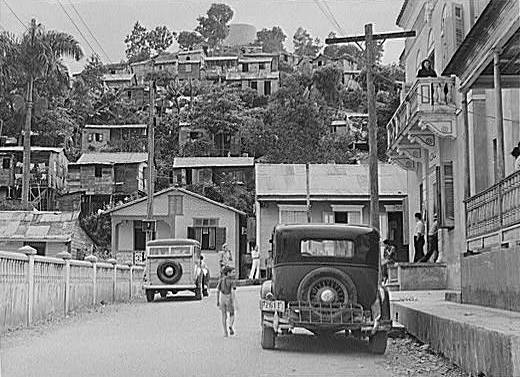
- Street in Orocovis Pueblo in 1941

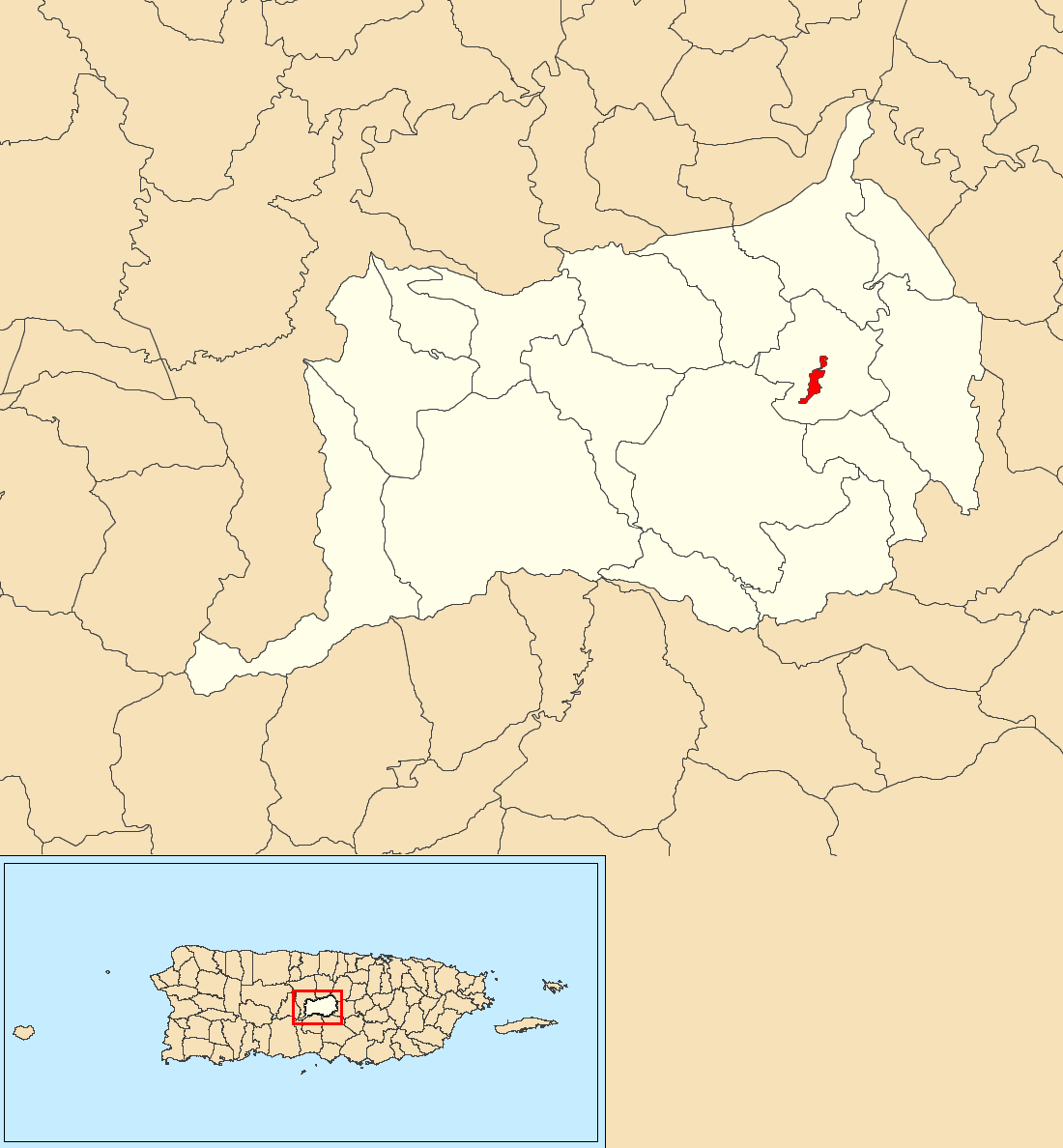
- Location of Barrio Pueblo within the municipality of Orocovis shown in red

- Location of Puerto Rico
- Coordinates: 18°13′31″N 66°23′30″W
- Commonwealth: Puerto Rico
- Municipality: Orocovis

Area
  - Total: 0.11 sq mi (0.28 km^{2})
  - Land: 0.11 sq mi (0.28 km^{2})
  - Water: 0 sq mi (0 km^{2})
- Elevation: 1,657 ft (505 m)

Population (2010)
  - Total: 682
  - Density: 6,200/sq mi (2,400/km^{2})
- Source: 2010 Census
- Time zone: UTC−4 (AST)
- ZIP Code: 00720
- Area code: 787/939

Barrio Pueblo is a barrio and the administrative center (seat) of Orocovis, a municipality of Puerto Rico. Its population in 2010 was 682.

As was customary in Spain, in Puerto Rico, the municipality has a barrio called pueblo which contains a central plaza, the municipal buildings (city hall), and a Catholic church. Fiestas patronales (patron saint festivals) are held in the central plaza every year.

Historical population
Census	Pop.	Note	%±
1900	962		—
1910	1,008		4.8%
1920	1,204		19.4%
1930	1,492		23.9%
1940	1,934		29.6%
1950	2,674		38.3%
1960	3,005		12.4%
1970	0		−100.0%
1980	1,256		—
1990	959		−23.6%
2000	851		−11.3%
2010	682		−19.9%
U.S. Decennial Census; 1899 (shown as 1900) 1910-1930; 1930-1950 1980-2000 2010

== Sectors ==
Barrios (which are, in contemporary times, roughly comparable to minor civil divisions) in turn are further subdivided into smaller local populated place areas/units called sectores (sectors in English). The types of sectores may vary, from normally sector to urbanización to reparto to barriada to residencial, among others.

The following sectors are in Barrio Pueblo barrio:

Calle Dr. Umpierre, Calle Hospital, Calle Las Flores, Calle Luis M. Alfaro, Calle Martín Barry, Calle Pedro Arroyo, Calle 4 de Julio, Residencial José Ventura Fortis, Sector El Acueducto Viejo, Sector Juan de Rivera y Santiago, Sector La Colecturía, Sector La Esso, Sector La Pica, Sector La Texaco, Sector Los Duros, Sector Salida a Barranquitas, Sector Salida a Coamo, Sector Salida a Corozal, Sector Salida a Morovis, and Sector Salsipuedes.

== The central plaza and its church ==
The central plaza was built on land donated by Juan de Rivera y Santiago, the founder of Orocovis. The central plaza, or square, is a place for official and unofficial recreational events and a place where people can gather and socialize from dusk to dawn. The Laws of the Indies, Spanish law, which regulated life in Puerto Rico in the early 19th century, stated the plaza's purpose was for "the parties" (celebrations, festivities) (Spanish: a propósito para las fiestas), and that the square should be proportionally large enough for the number of neighbors (Spanish: grandeza proporcionada al número de vecinos). These Spanish regulations also stated that the streets nearby should be comfortable portals for passersby, protecting them from the elements: sun and rain.

Located across the central plaza in Barrio Pueblo is the Parroquia San Juan Bautista, a Roman Catholic church, which was inaugurated on October 29, 1838.

Orocovis celebrates its patron saint festival in the central plaza each June. The Fiestas Patronales de San Juan Bautista is a religious and cultural celebration that generally features parades, games, artisans, amusement rides, regional food, and live entertainment.

== History ==
By 1838, the town's Catholic church had been inaugurated after being built on land donated by Juan de Rivera y Santiago, the town's founder.

Barrio Pueblo was in Spain's gazetteers until Puerto Rico was ceded by Spain in the aftermath of the Spanish–American War under the terms of the Treaty of Paris of 1898 and became an unincorporated territory of the United States. In 1899, the United States Department of War conducted a census of Puerto Rico finding that the population of Orocovis Pueblo (a barrio named Pueblo in Barros, as the municipality of Orocovis was called at the time) was 962.

In July 2020, Federal Emergency Management Agency appropriated funds for repairs to Orocovis' plaza.

== Gallery ==
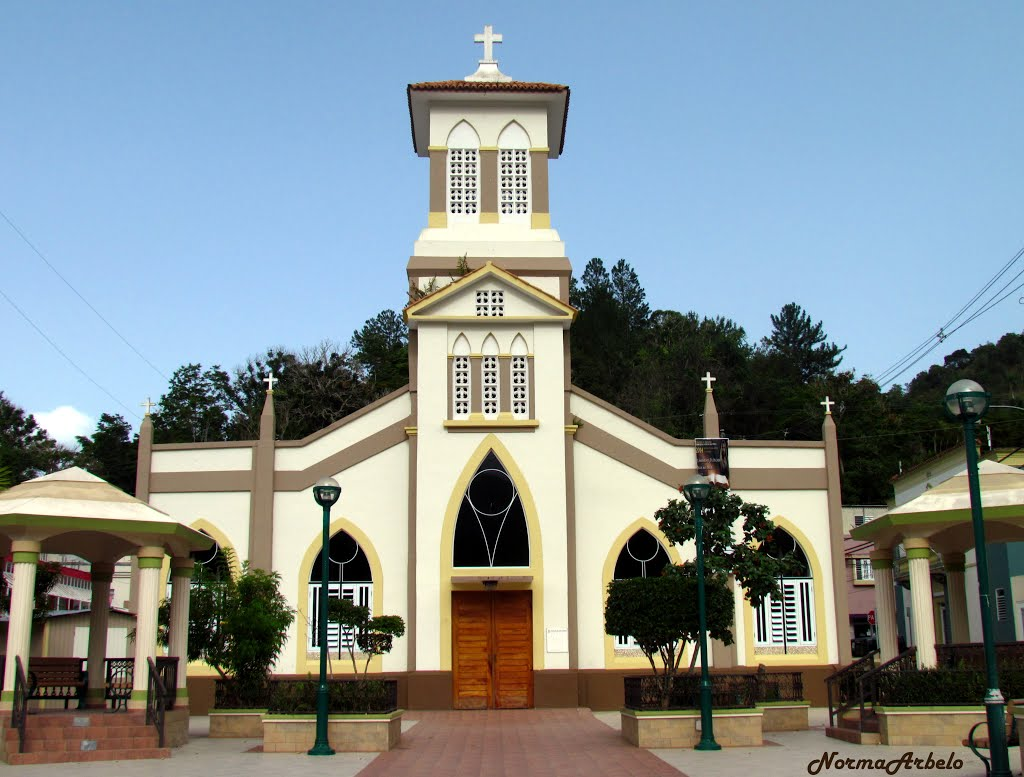
San Juan Bautista Parish in Orocovis

== See also ==
- List of communities in Puerto Rico
