= Cacaos =

Barrio of Orocovis, Puerto Rico

- Barrio
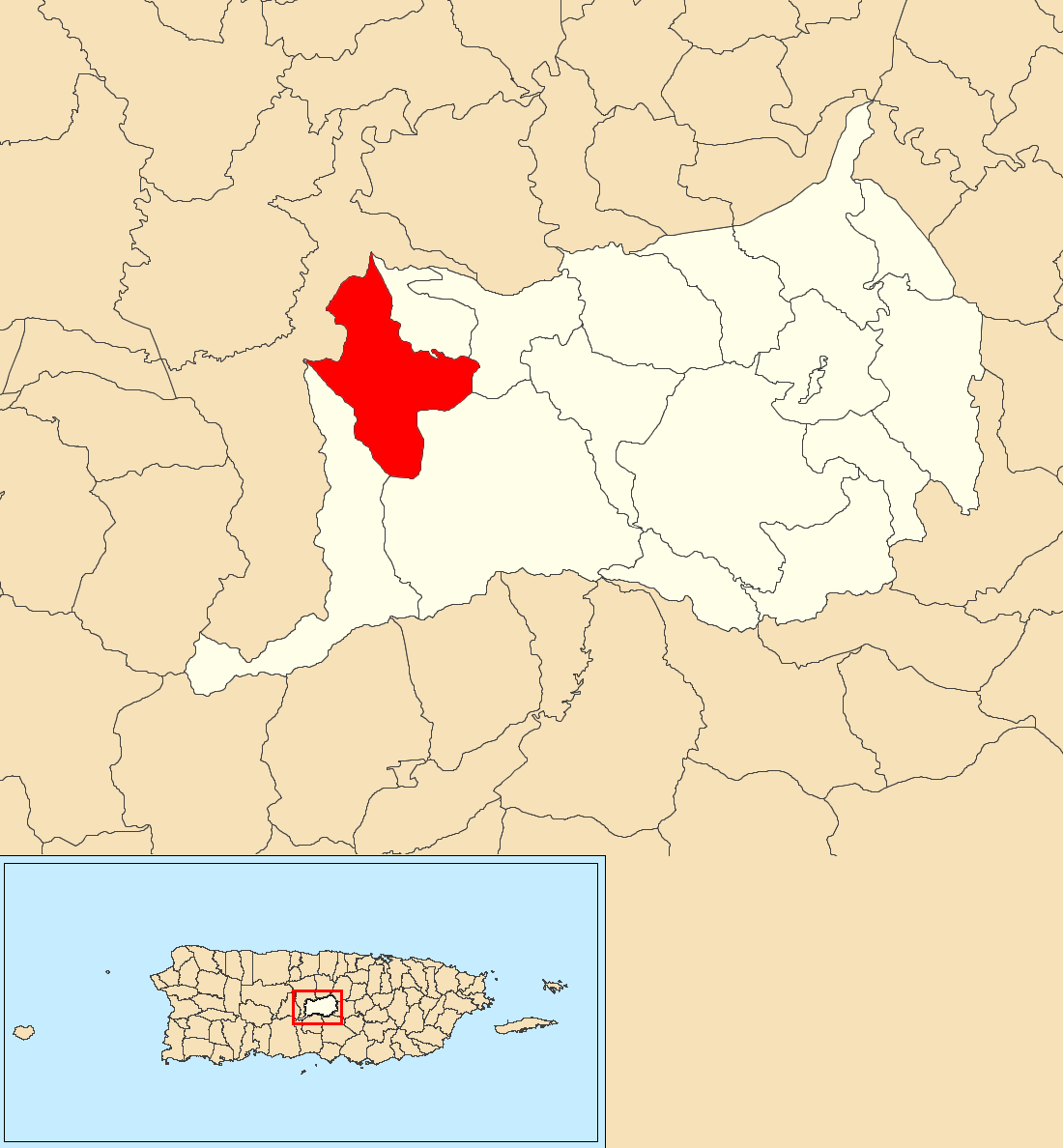
- Location of Cacaos within the municipality of Orocovis shown in red

- Location of Puerto Rico
- Coordinates: 18°13′34″N 66°29′48″W
- Commonwealth: Puerto Rico
- Municipality: Orocovis

Area
  - Total: 4.35 sq mi (11.3 km^{2})
  - Land: 4.35 sq mi (11.3 km^{2})
  - Water: 0 sq mi (0 km^{2})
- Elevation: 1,394 ft (425 m)

Population (2010)
  - Total: 878
  - Density: 201.8/sq mi (77.9/km^{2})
- Source: 2010 Census
- Time zone: UTC−4 (AST)
- ZIP Code: 00720
- Area code: 787/939

Cacaos is a barrio in the municipality of Orocovis, Puerto Rico. Its population in 2010 was 878.

== Sectors ==
Barrios (which are, in contemporary times, roughly comparable to minor civil divisions) in turn are further subdivided into smaller local populated place areas/units called sectores (sectors in English). The types of sectores may vary, from normally sector to urbanización to reparto to barriada to residencial, among others.

The following sectors are in Cacaos barrio:

Sector Cacaos, Sector Cacaos Alturita, Sector Cacaos Centro, Sector Hacienda, and Sector Parcelas Sapia.

== History ==
Cacaos was in Spain's gazetteers until Puerto Rico was ceded by Spain in the aftermath of the Spanish–American War under the terms of the Treaty of Paris of 1898 and became an unincorporated territory of the United States. In 1899, the United States Department of War conducted a census of Puerto Rico finding that the combined population of Cacaos and Collores barrios was 1,588.

Historical population
Census	Pop.	Note	%±
1910	931		—
1920	850		−8.7%
1930	639		−24.8%
1940	1,058		65.6%
1950	980		−7.4%
1960	1,021		4.2%
1970	839		−17.8%
1980	485		−42.2%
1990	793		63.5%
2000	902		13.7%
2010	878		−2.7%
U.S. Decennial Census; 1900 (N/A) 1910-1930; 1930-1950 1980-2000 2010

== See also ==
- List of communities in Puerto Rico
