= Orocovis River =

River of Puerto Rico

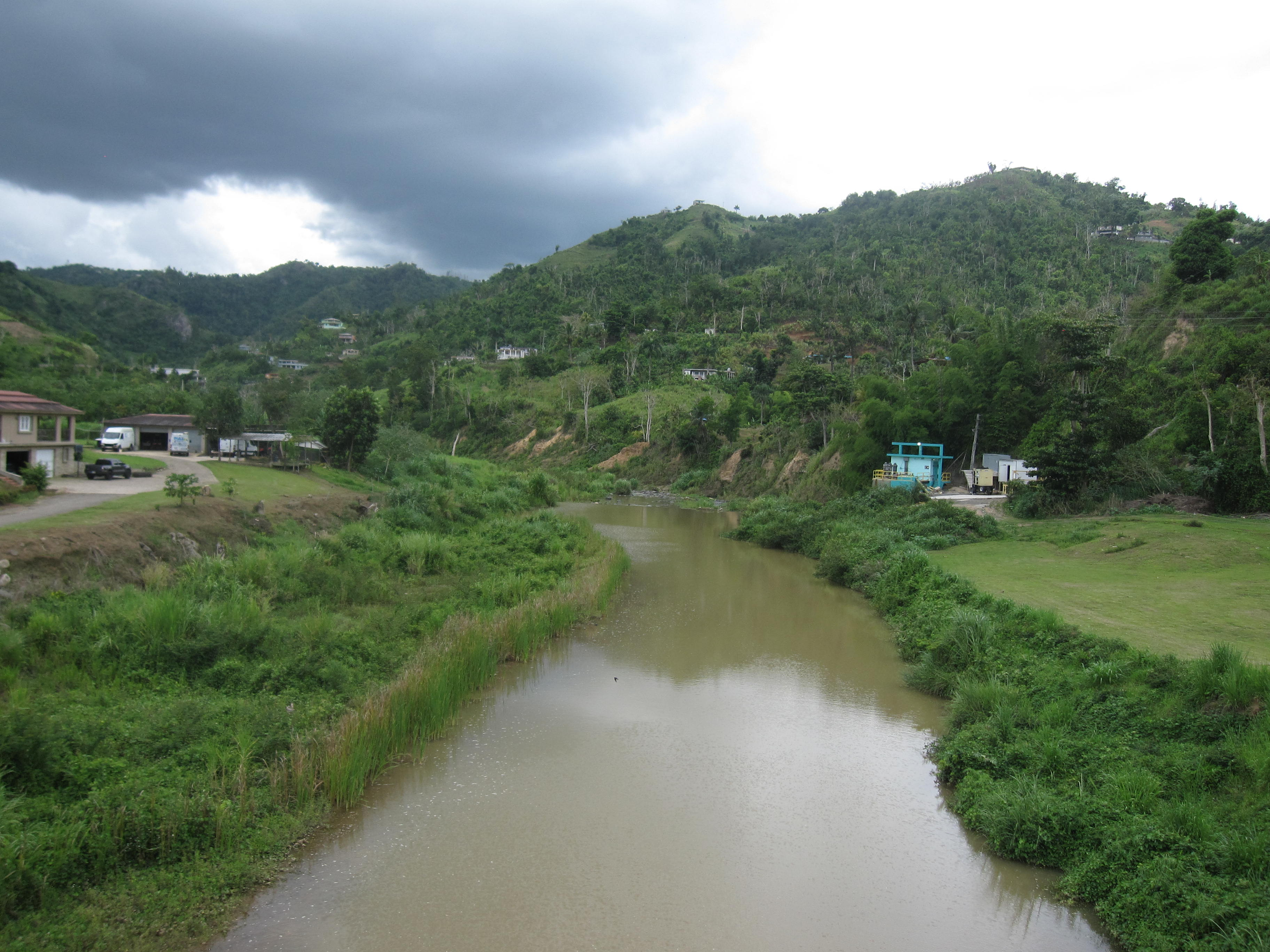
- Orocovis River from bridge on PR-155, Río Grande, Morovis
- Native name: Río Orocovis (Spanish)

Location
- Commonwealth: Puerto Rico
- Municipalities: Corozal, Morovis, Orocovis

Physical characteristics
- Source
  - location: Cordillera Central in Bauta Arriba, Orocovis
  - coordinates: 18.2938420°N 66.3776700°W
  - elevation: 653 ft.
- Mouth
  - location: Bauta River in San Lorenzo, Morovis
  - elevation: 223 ft.

The Orocovis River (Spanish: Río Orocovis) is a tributary of the Bauta River, itself part of Manatí River (Río Grande de Manatí) basin. The Orocovis River flows through Cordillera Central, along the municipalities Orocovis, Morovis, and Corozal in Puerto Rico.

== Gallery ==
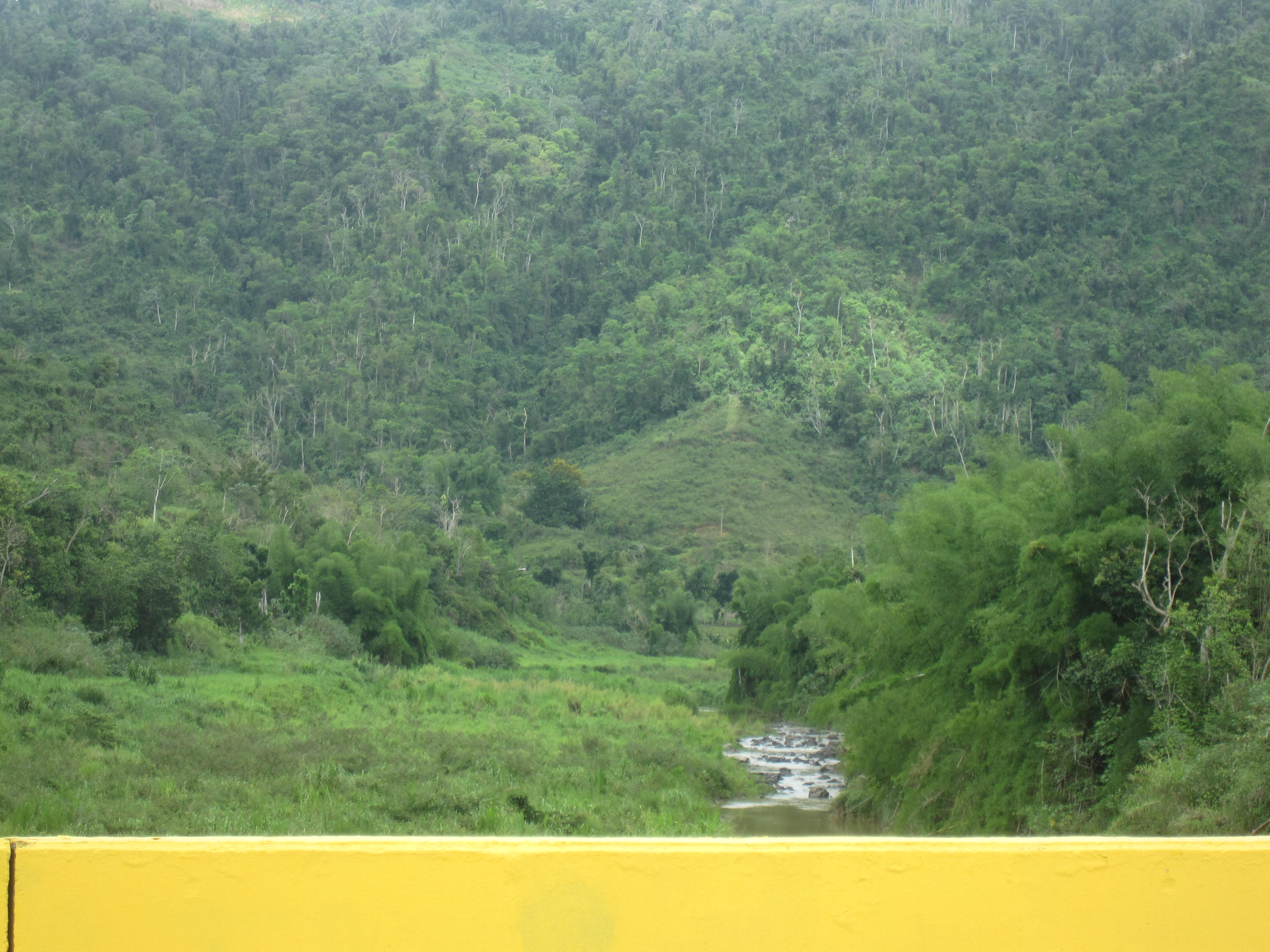
View from a bridge of PR-155, in Sector La Playita of Río Grande, Morovis

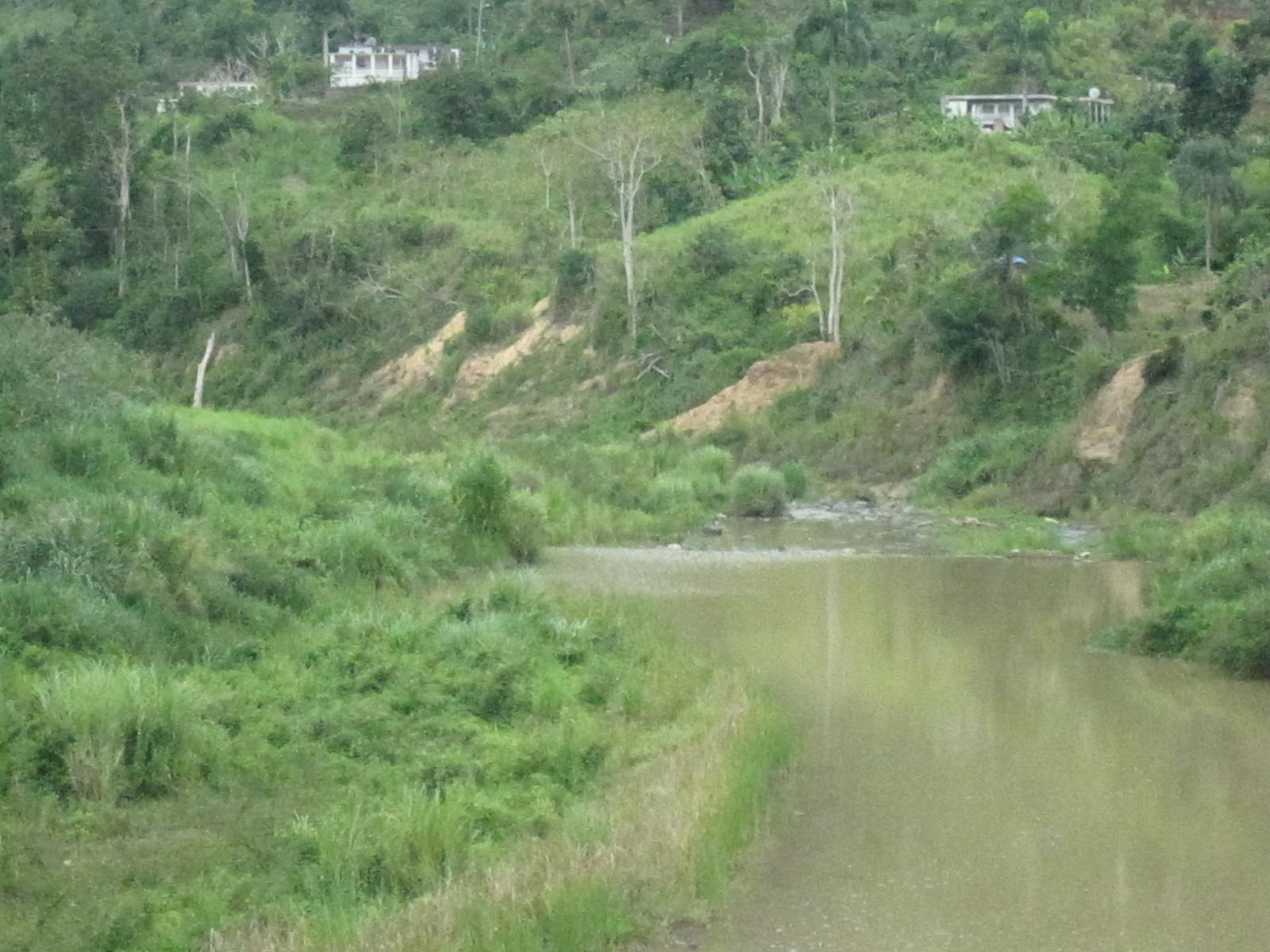
View from a bridge of PR-155, in Sector La Playita of Río Grande, Morovis

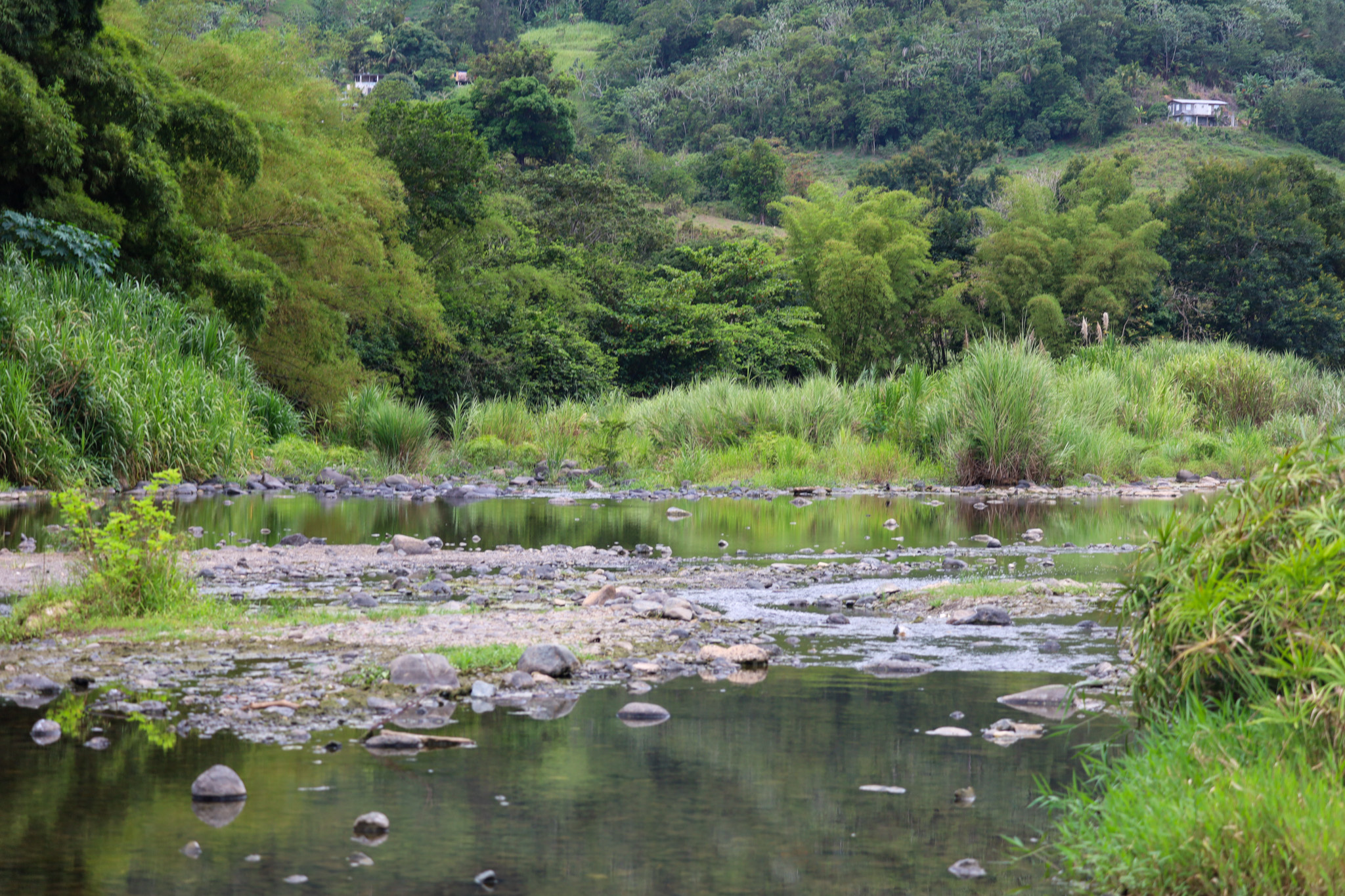
View of the river near La Esperanza Bridge in San Lorenzo, Morovis

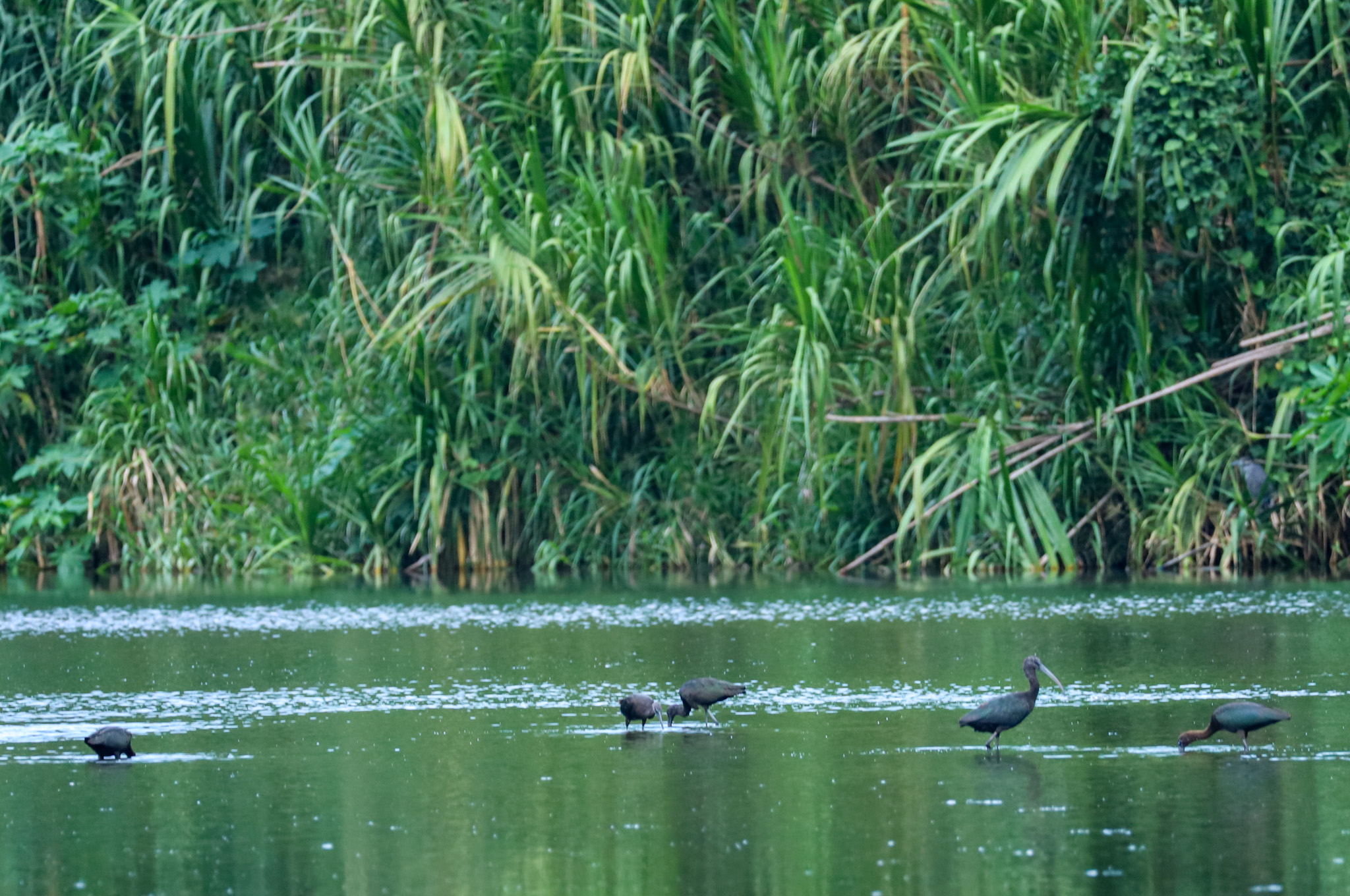
Glossy ibises in the Orocovis River

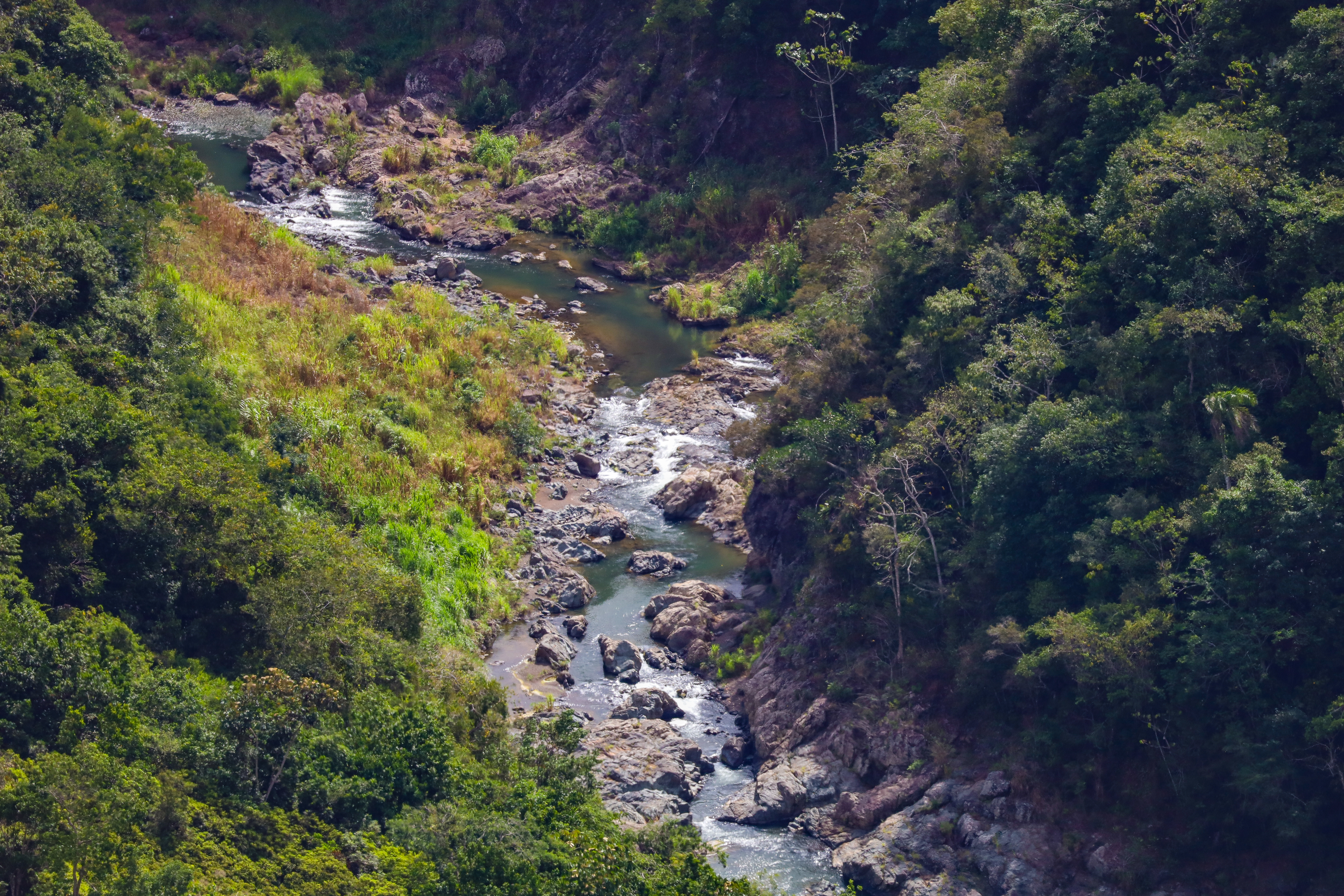
View of the river from Perchas, Morovis.

== See also ==
- List of rivers of Puerto Rico
