= Botijas =

Barrio of Orocovis, Puerto Rico

- Barrio
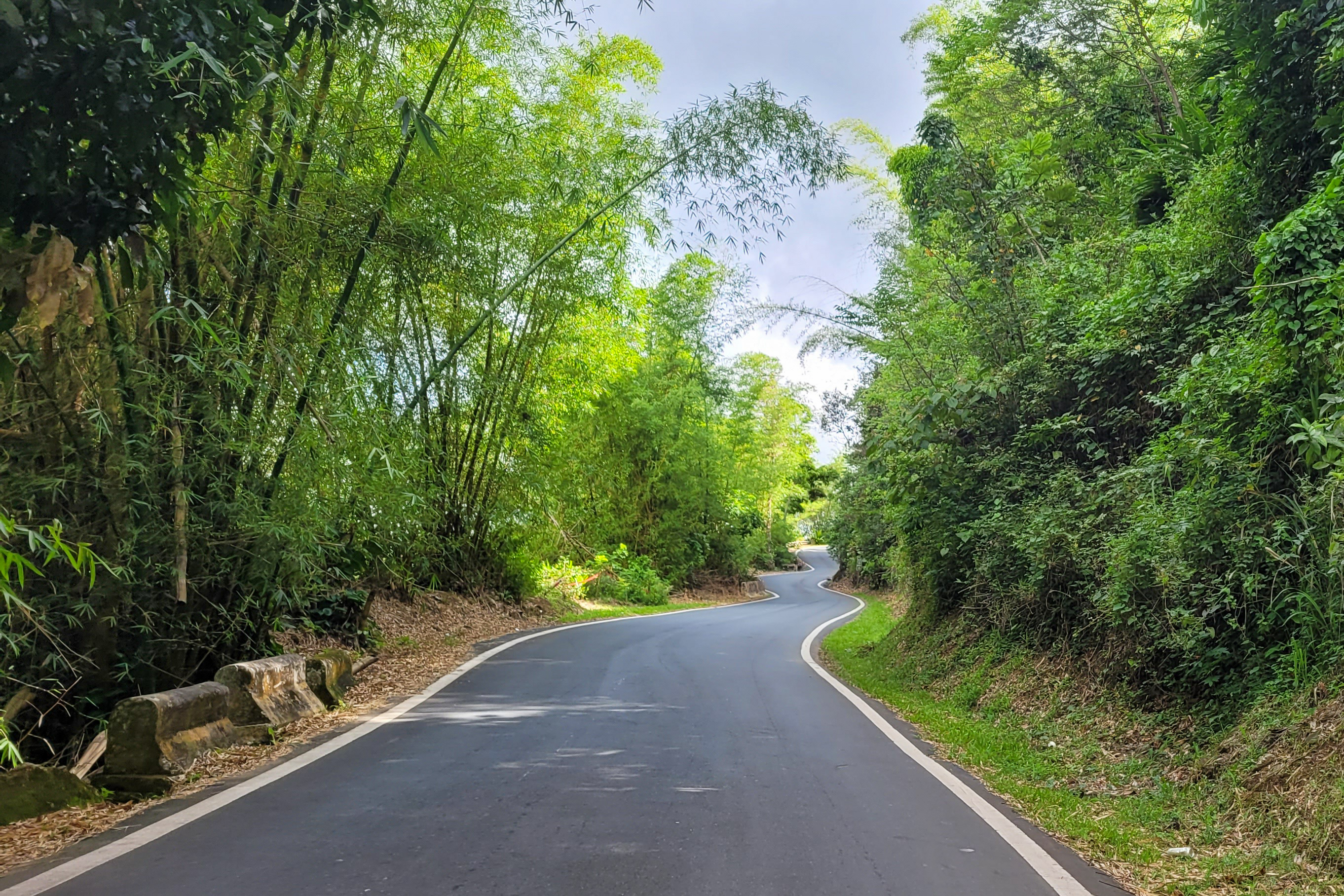
- Puerto Rico Highway 568 between Botijas and Mata de Cañas barrios

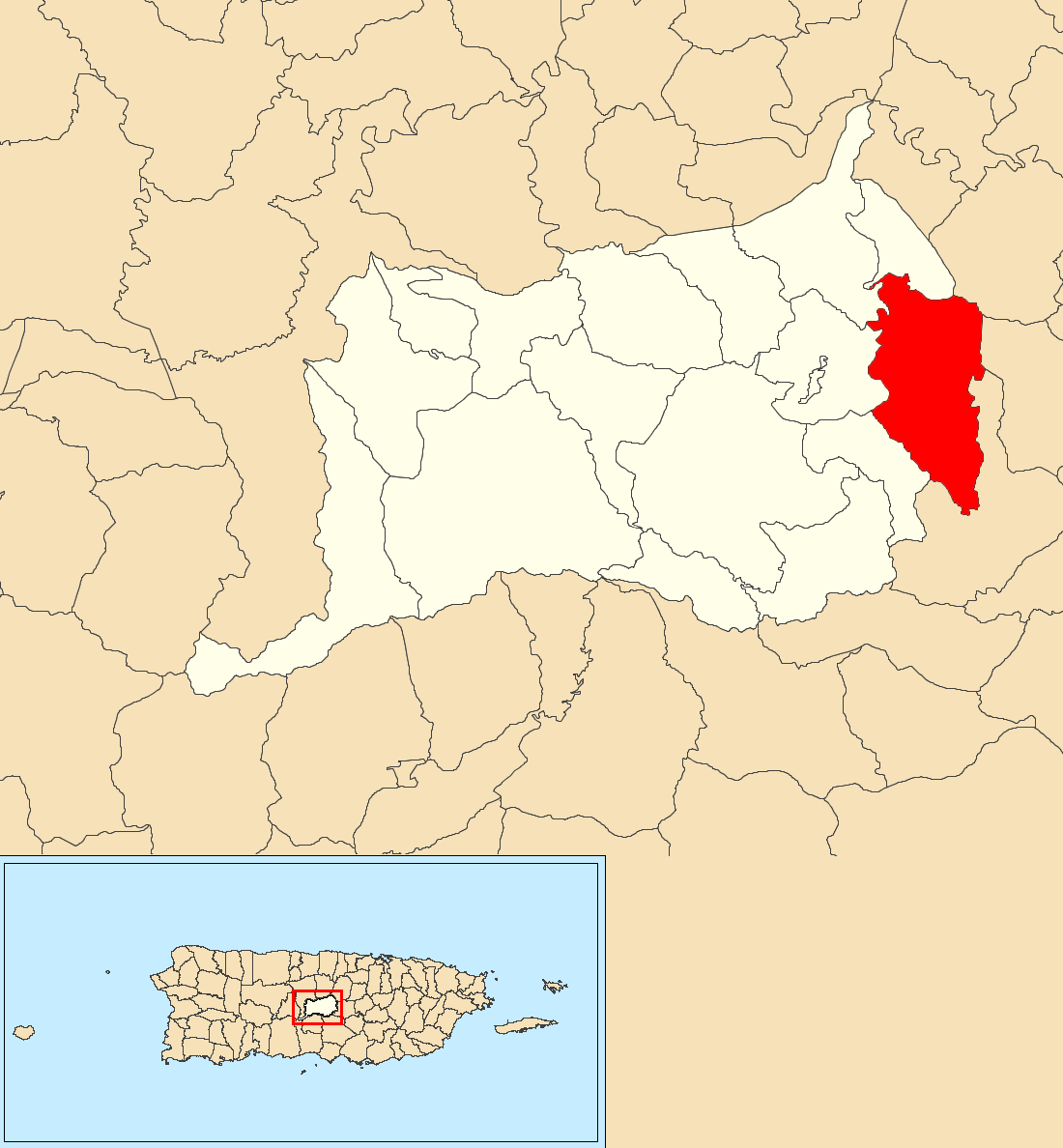
- Location of Botijas within the municipality of Orocovis shown in red

- Location of Puerto Rico
- Coordinates: 18°13′28″N 66°21′48″W
- Commonwealth: Puerto Rico
- Municipality: Orocovis

Area
  - Total: 4.94 sq mi (12.8 km^{2})
  - Land: 4.94 sq mi (12.8 km^{2})
  - Water: 0 sq mi (0 km^{2})
- Elevation: 2,028 ft (618 m)

Population (2010)
  - Total: 3,720
  - Density: 753/sq mi (291/km^{2})
- Source: 2010 Census
- Time zone: UTC−4 (AST)
- ZIP Code: 00720
- Area code: 787/939

Botijas is a barrio in the municipality of Orocovis, Puerto Rico. Its population in 2010 was 3,720.

== Sectors ==
Barrios (which are, in contemporary times, roughly comparable to minor civil divisions) in turn are further subdivided into smaller local populated place areas/units called sectores (sectors in English). The types of sectores may vary, from normally sector to urbanización to reparto to barriada to residencial, among others.

The following sectors are in Botijas barrio:

=== Botijas I ===
Sector El Puente, Sector El Quenepo, Sector La Curva, Sector La Loma, Sector La Revés, Sector Las Parcelas, and Sector Manuel Cartagena.

=== Botijas II ===
Sector Casablanca, Sector El Cruce de Mayo, Sector El Molino, Sector El Puente, Sector Guillo Colón, Sector La Escuela, Sector La Médica, Sector La Recta, Sector Las Marías, Sector Las Parcelas, Sector Los Morales, Sector Los Sandoval, Sector Manuel Berríos, Sector Pello Pagán, and Sector Rabanal.

== History ==
Botijas was in Spain's gazetteers until Puerto Rico was ceded by Spain in the aftermath of the Spanish–American War under the terms of the Treaty of Paris of 1898 and became an unincorporated territory of the United States. In 1899, the United States Department of War conducted a census of Puerto Rico finding that the population of Botijas barrio was 891.

Historical population
| Census | Pop. | Note | %± |
|---|---|---|---|
| 1900 | 891 | | — |
| 1910 | 1,085 | | 21.8% |
| 1920 | 972 | | −10.4% |
| 1930 | 1,314 | | 35.2% |
| 1940 | 1,833 | | 39.5% |
| 1950 | 2,236 | | 22.0% |
| 1960 | 2,467 | | 10.3% |
| 1970 | 2,999 | | 21.6% |
| 1980 | 3,394 | | 13.2% |
| 1990 | 3,168 | | −6.7% |
| 2000 | 3,794 | | 19.8% |
| 2010 | 3,720 | | −2.0% |
U.S. Decennial Census; 1899 (shown as 1900) 1910-1930; 1930-1950 1980-2000 2010

== See also ==
- List of communities in Puerto Rico
