= Fiestas patronales in Puerto Rico =

Yearly celebrations held in each municipality

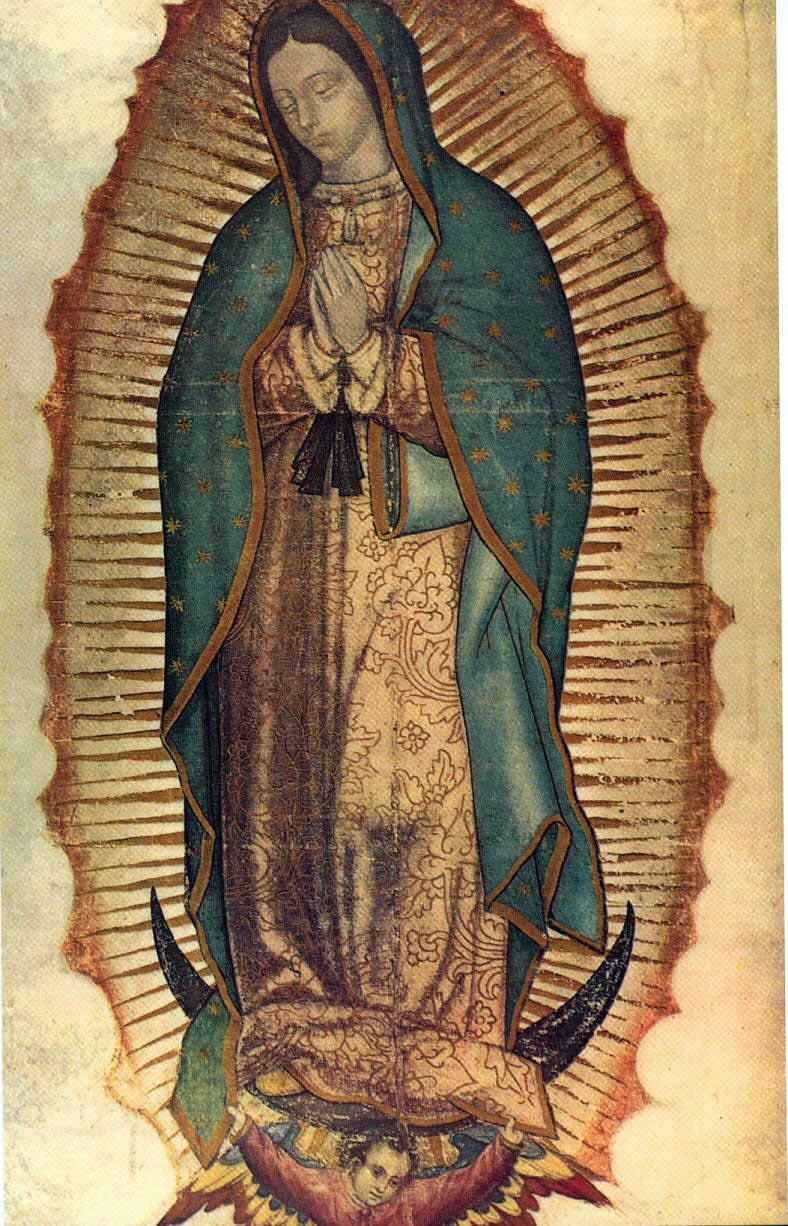
Every town has its patron saint. Above, Virgen of Guadalupe, Ponce's patron saint.

Fiestas patronales in Puerto Rico are yearly celebrations held in each municipality of the island. Like in other countries, "fiestas patronales" are heavily influenced by Spanish culture and religion, and are dedicated to a saint or the Blessed Virgin Mary under one of her titles.

The festivities usually include religious processions honoring its Catholic heritage. However, elements of African and local culture have been incorporated as well. They also feature parades, games, artisans, amusement rides, regional food, and live entertainment.

== Schedule of fiestas patronales ==
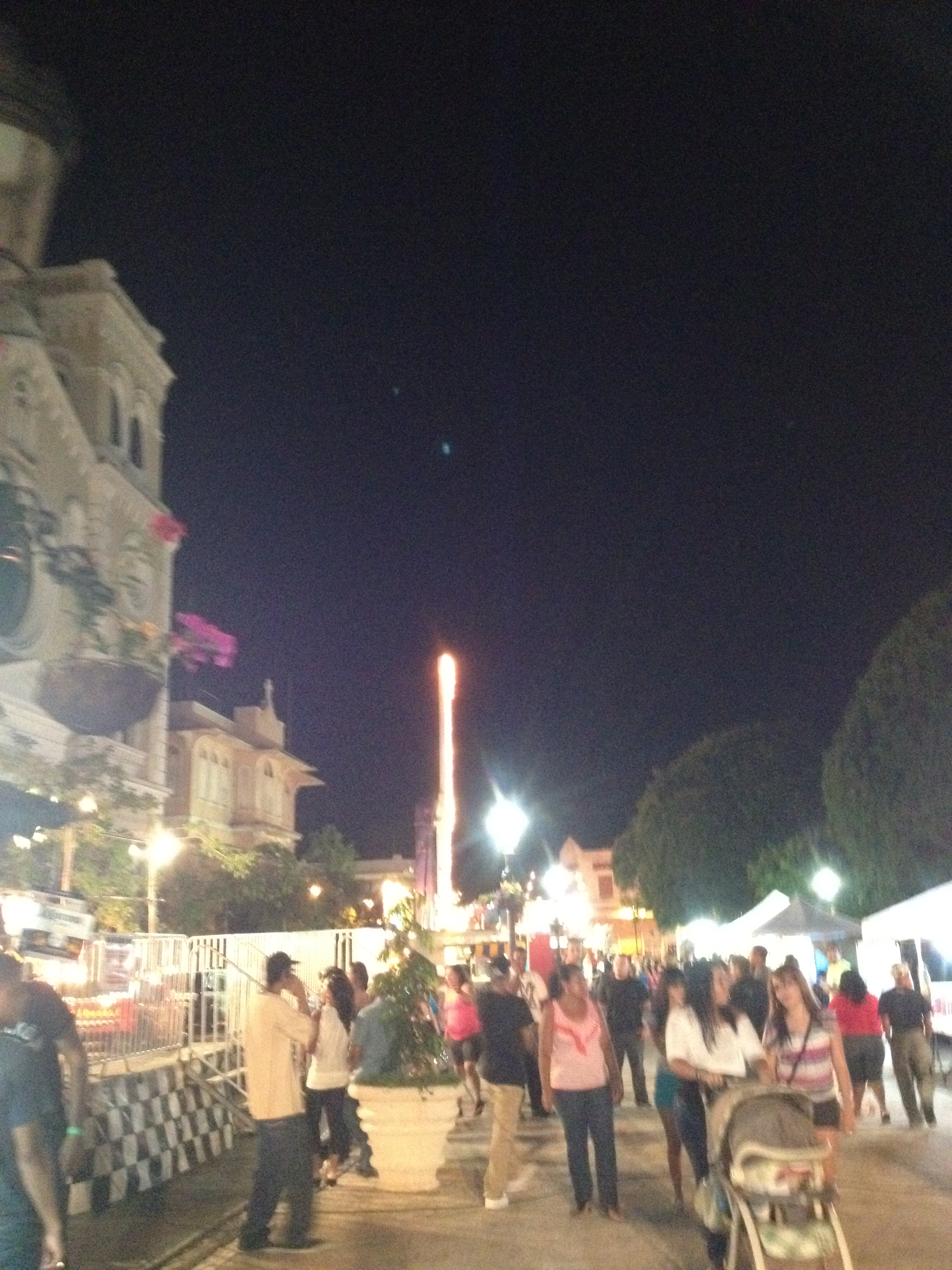
Fiestas Patronales de San Antonio de Padua in Guayama

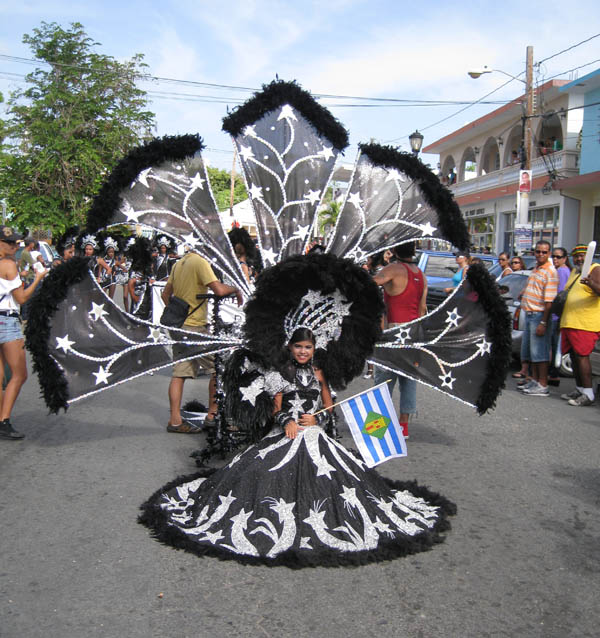
Patron saint festival in Vieques

| Date | Town | Patron saint |
|---|---|---|
| January 9 | Corozal | Holy Family |
| January 17 | Añasco | Saint Anthony |
| January 20 | San Sebastián | Saint Sebastian |
| February 2 | Coamo | Virgin of Candelaria |
| February 2 | Lajas | Virgin of Candelaria |
| February 2 | Manatí | Virgin of Candelaria |
| February 2 | Mayagüez | Virgin of Candelaria |
| February 3 | Coamo | Saint Blaise |
| March 17 | Loíza | Saint Patrick |
| March 19 | Ciales | Saint Joseph |
| March 19 | Gurabo | Saint Joseph |
| March 19 | Lares | Saint Joseph |
| March 19 | Luquillo | Saint Joseph |
| March 19 | Peñuelas | Saint Joseph |
| March 31 | Patillas | Saint Benedict |
| April 29 | Guaynabo | Saint Peter Martyr |
| May 1 | Arecibo | Saint Philip the Apostle |
| May 3 | Bayamón | True Cross |
| May 3 | Trujillo Alto | True Cross |
| May 15 | Maunabo | Saint Isidore |
| May 15 | Sabana Grande | Saint Isidore the Laborer |
| May 30 | Carolina | Saint Ferdinand |
| May 30 | Toa Alta | Saint Ferdinand |
| June 13 | Barranquitas | Saint Anthony of Padua |
| June 13 | Ceiba | Saint Anthony of Padua |
| June 13 | Dorado | Saint Anthony of Padua |
| June 13 | Guayama | Saint Anthony of Padua |
| June 13 | Isabela | Saint Anthony of Padua |
| June 24 | Maricao | Saint John the Baptist |
| June 24 | Orocovis | Saint John the Baptist |
| June 24 | San Juan | Saint John the Baptist |
| June 30 | Toa Baja | Saint Peter |
| July 16 | Arroyo | Our Lady of Mount Carmel |
| July 16 | Barceloneta | Our Lady of Mount Carmel |
| July 16 | Cataño | Our Lady of Mount Carmel |
| July 16 | Cidra | Our Lady of Mount Carmel |
| July 16 | Culebra | Our Lady of Mount Carmel |
| July 16 | Hatillo | Our Lady of Mount Carmel |
| July 16 | Morovis | Our Lady of Mount Carmel |
| July 16 | Río Grande | Our Lady of Mount Carmel |
| July 16 | Villalba | Our Lady of Mount Carmel |
| July 25 | Aibonito | James the Apostle |
| July 25 | Fajardo | James the Apostle |
| July 25 | Guánica | James the Apostle |
| July 25 | Loíza | James the Apostle |
| July 25 | Santa Isabel | James the Apostle |
| July 31 | San Germán | Saint Germain |
| August 6 | Comerío | Holy Christ of Health |
| August 10 | San Lorenzo | Saint Lawrence |
| August 15 | Cayey | Our Lady of the Assumption |
| August 21 | Adjuntas | Saint Joachim & Saint Anne |
| August 30 | Rincón | Saint Rose of Lima |
| August 31 | Juana Díaz | Saint Raymond Nonnatus |
| September 8 | Aguas Buenas | Our Lady of Montserrat |
| September 8 | Hormigueros | Our Lady of Montserrat |
| September 8 | Jayuya | Our Lady of Montserrat |
| September 8 | Moca | Our Lady of Montserrat |
| September 8 | Salinas | Our Lady of Montserrat |
| September 29 | Cabo Rojo | Saint Michael the Archangel |
| September 29 | Naranjito | Saint Michael the Archangel |
| September 29 | Utuado | Saint Michael the Archangel |
| October 2 | Yabucoa | Guardian Angels |
| October 4 | Aguada | Saint Francis of Assisi |
| October 7 | Naguabo | Our Lady of the Rosary |
| October 7 | Vega Baja | Our Lady of the Rosary |
| October 7 | Yauco | Our Lady of the Rosary |
| October 12 | Canóvanas | Our Lady of the Pillar |
| October 12 | Río Piedras | Our Lady of the Pillar |
| October 24 | Quebradillas | Saint Raphael Archangel |
| November 4 | Aguadilla | Saint Charles Borromeo |
| December 8 | Guayanilla | The Immaculate Conception of Mary |
| December 8 | Humacao | The Immaculate Conception of Mary |
| December 8 | Juncos | The Immaculate Conception of Mary |
| December 8 | Las Marías | The Immaculate Conception of Mary |
| December 8 | Las Piedras | The Immaculate Conception of Mary |
| December 8 | Vega Alta | The Immaculate Conception of Mary |
| December 8 | Vieques | The Immaculate Conception of Mary |
| December 12 | Ponce | Our Lady of Guadalupe |

== See also ==
- Fiestas patronales de Ponce
- Patronal festival
