= Bauta Arriba =

Barrio of Orocovis, Puerto Rico

- Barrio
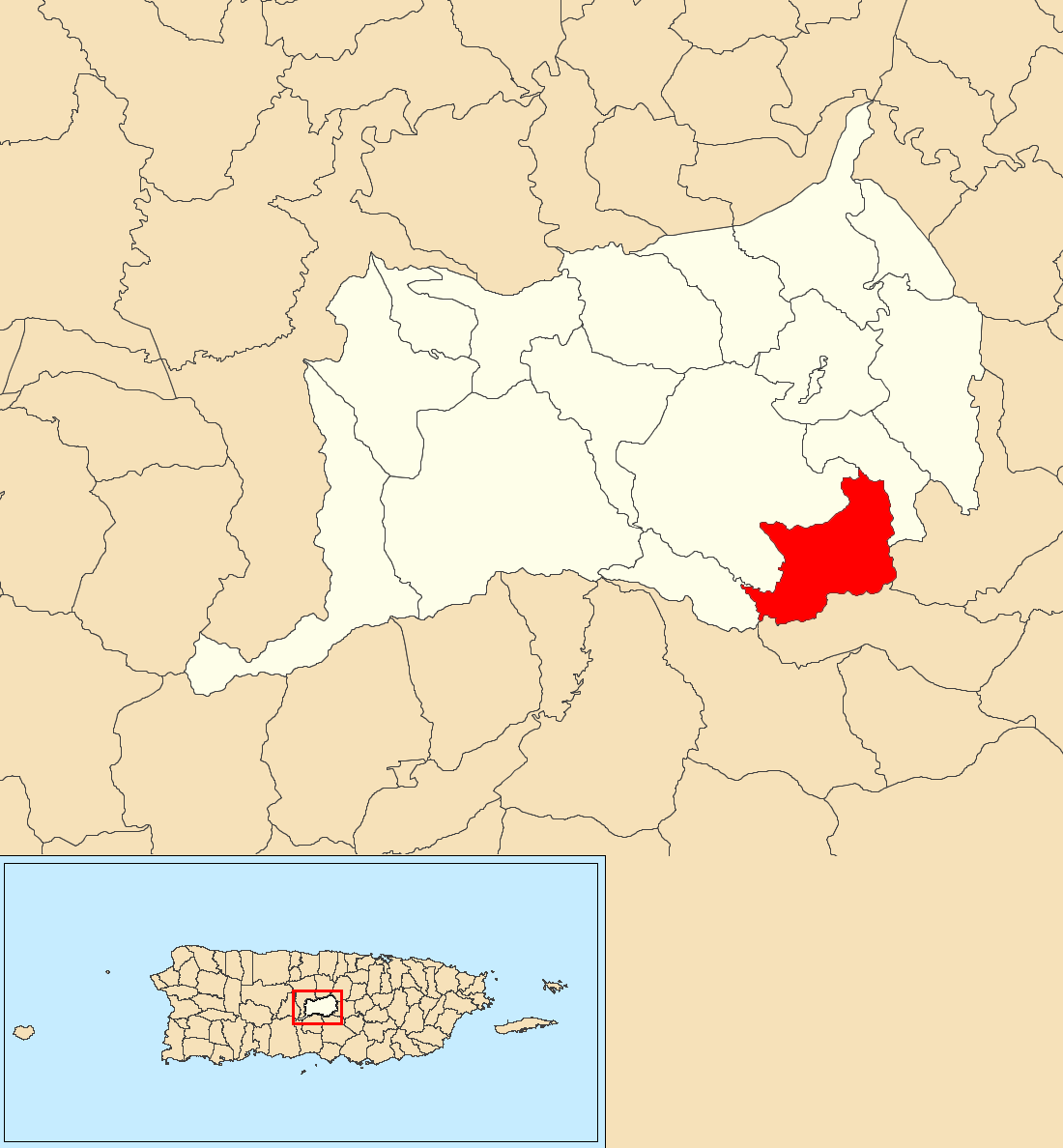
- Location of Bauta Arriba within the municipality of Orocovis shown in red

- Location of Puerto Rico
- Coordinates: 18°10′55″N 66°23′16″W
- Commonwealth: Puerto Rico
- Municipality: Orocovis

Area
  - Total: 3.24 sq mi (8.4 km^{2})
  - Land: 3.24 sq mi (8.4 km^{2})
  - Water: 0 sq mi (0 km^{2})
- Elevation: 2,785 ft (849 m)

Population (2010)
  - Total: 913
  - Density: 281.8/sq mi (108.8/km^{2})
- Source: 2010 Census
- Time zone: UTC−4 (AST)
- ZIP Code: 00720
- Area code: 787/939

Bauta Arriba is a barrio in the municipality of Orocovis, Puerto Rico. Its population in 2010 was 913.

== Sectors ==
Barrios (which are, in contemporary times, roughly comparable to minor civil divisions) in turn are further subdivided into smaller local populated place areas/units called sectores (sectors in English). The types of sectores may vary, from normally sector to urbanización to reparto to barriada to residencial, among others.

The following sectors are in Bauta Arriba barrio:

Sector Bauta Centro, Sector Don Pei, Sector Eduino Hernández, Sector El Tropical, Sector Garage Diego, Sector Jesús Meléndez, Sector La Aldea, Sector La Escuela, Sector Los Marrero, Sector Los Meléndez, Sector Los Rivas, Sector Luis Sáez, Sector Puente Doble, and Sector Sixto Rivera Jr.

== History ==
Bauta Arriba was in Spain's gazetteers until Puerto Rico was ceded by Spain in the aftermath of the Spanish–American War under the terms of the Treaty of Paris of 1898 and became an unincorporated territory of the United States. In 1899, the United States Department of War conducted a census of Puerto Rico finding that the combined population of Bauta Arriba and Pellejas barrios was 1,331.

Historical population
Census	Pop.	Note	%±
1910	708		—
1920	774		9.3%
1930	769		−0.6%
1940	812		5.6%
1950	757		−6.8%
1960	646		−14.7%
1970	709		9.8%
1980	474		−33.1%
1990	725		53.0%
2000	908		25.2%
2010	913		0.6%
U.S. Decennial Census; 1900 (N/A) 1910-1930; 1930-1950 1980-2000 2010

== See also ==
- List of communities in Puerto Rico
