= Gato, Orocovis, Puerto Rico =

Barrio of Puerto Rico

Gato
- Barrio
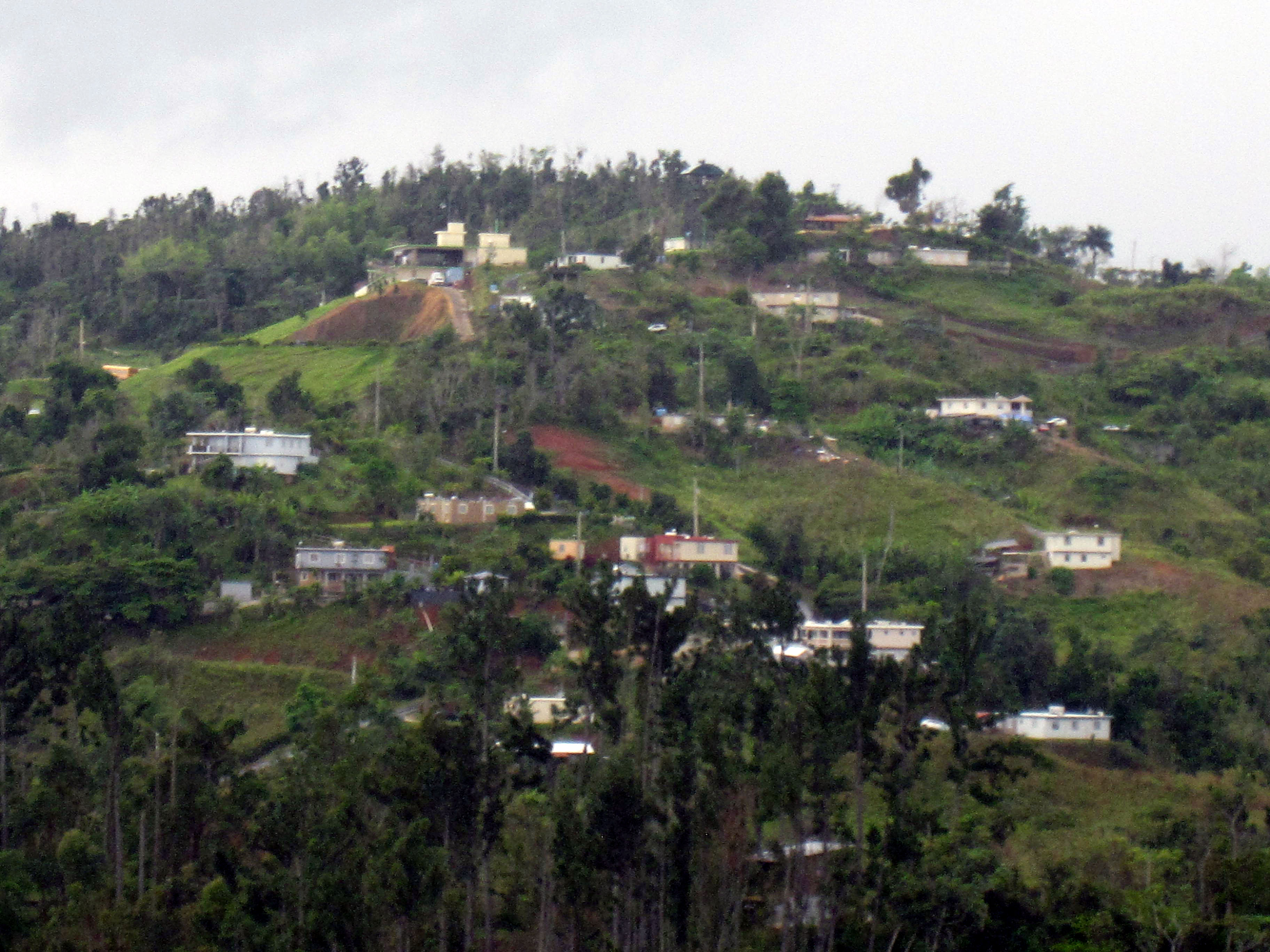
- Houses on a mountainside in Gato

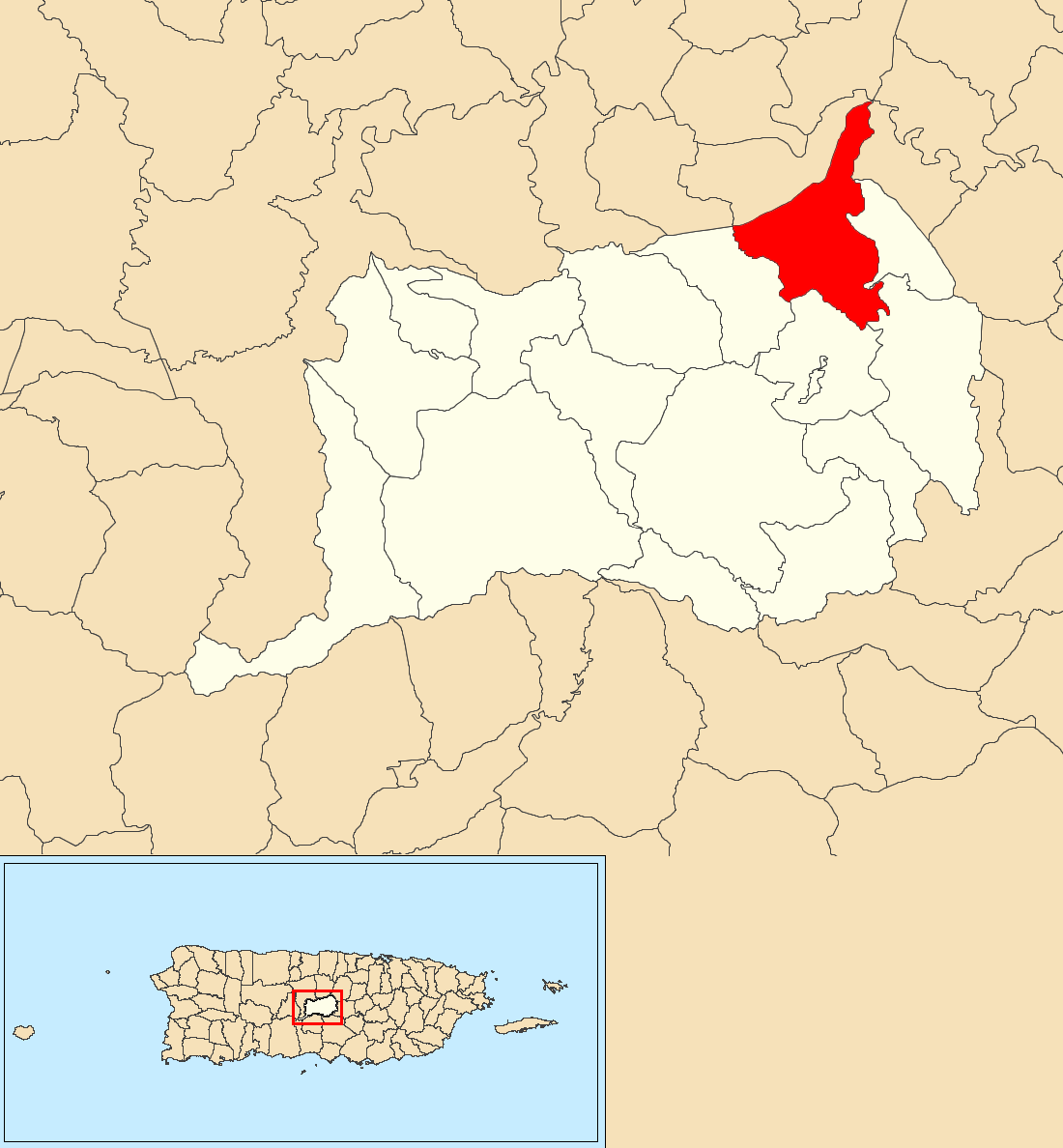
- Location of Gato within the municipality of Orocovis shown in red

- Location of Puerto Rico
- Coordinates: 18°15′39″N 66°23′23″W
- Commonwealth: Puerto Rico
- Municipality: Orocovis

Area
  - Total: 3.91 sq mi (10.1 km^{2})
  - Land: 3.91 sq mi (10.1 km^{2})
  - Water: 0 sq mi (0 km^{2})
- Elevation: 2,005 ft (611 m)

Population (2010)
  - Total: 2,072
  - Density: 529.9/sq mi (204.6/km^{2})
- Source: 2010 Census
- Time zone: UTC−4 (AST)
- ZIP Code: 00720
- Area code: 787/939

Gato is a barrio in the municipality of Orocovis, Puerto Rico. Its population in 2010 was 2,072.

== Sectors ==
Barrios (which are, in contemporary times, roughly comparable to minor civil divisions) in turn are further subdivided into smaller local populated place areas/units called sectores (sectors in English). The types of sectores may vary, from normally sector to urbanización to reparto to barriada to residencial, among others.

The following sectors are in Gato barrio:

Sector Bajuras, Sector Bolívar Pagán, Sector Doña Ofelia (El Radar), Sector El Campesino, Sector El Naranjo, Sector El Soldadito, Sector El Zapato, Sector Gato I, Sector Gato II, Sector La Capilla, Sector La Loma, Sector Lile Fortis, and Sector Los López.

== History ==
Gato was in Spain's gazetteers until Puerto Rico was ceded by Spain in the aftermath of the Spanish–American War under the terms of the Treaty of Paris of 1898 and became an unincorporated territory of the United States. In 1899, the United States Department of War conducted a census of Puerto Rico finding that the population of Gato barrio was 876.

Historical population
| Census | Pop. | Note | %± |
|---|---|---|---|
| 1900 | 876 | | — |
| 1910 | 786 | | −10.3% |
| 1920 | 714 | | −9.2% |
| 1930 | 541 | | −24.2% |
| 1940 | 902 | | 66.7% |
| 1950 | 954 | | 5.8% |
| 1960 | 905 | | −5.1% |
| 1970 | 817 | | −9.7% |
| 1980 | 1,162 | | 42.2% |
| 1990 | 1,746 | | 50.3% |
| 2000 | 2,075 | | 18.8% |
| 2010 | 2,072 | | −0.1% |
U.S. Decennial Census; 1899 (shown as 1900) 1910–1930; 1930–1950 1980–2000 2010

== Gallery ==
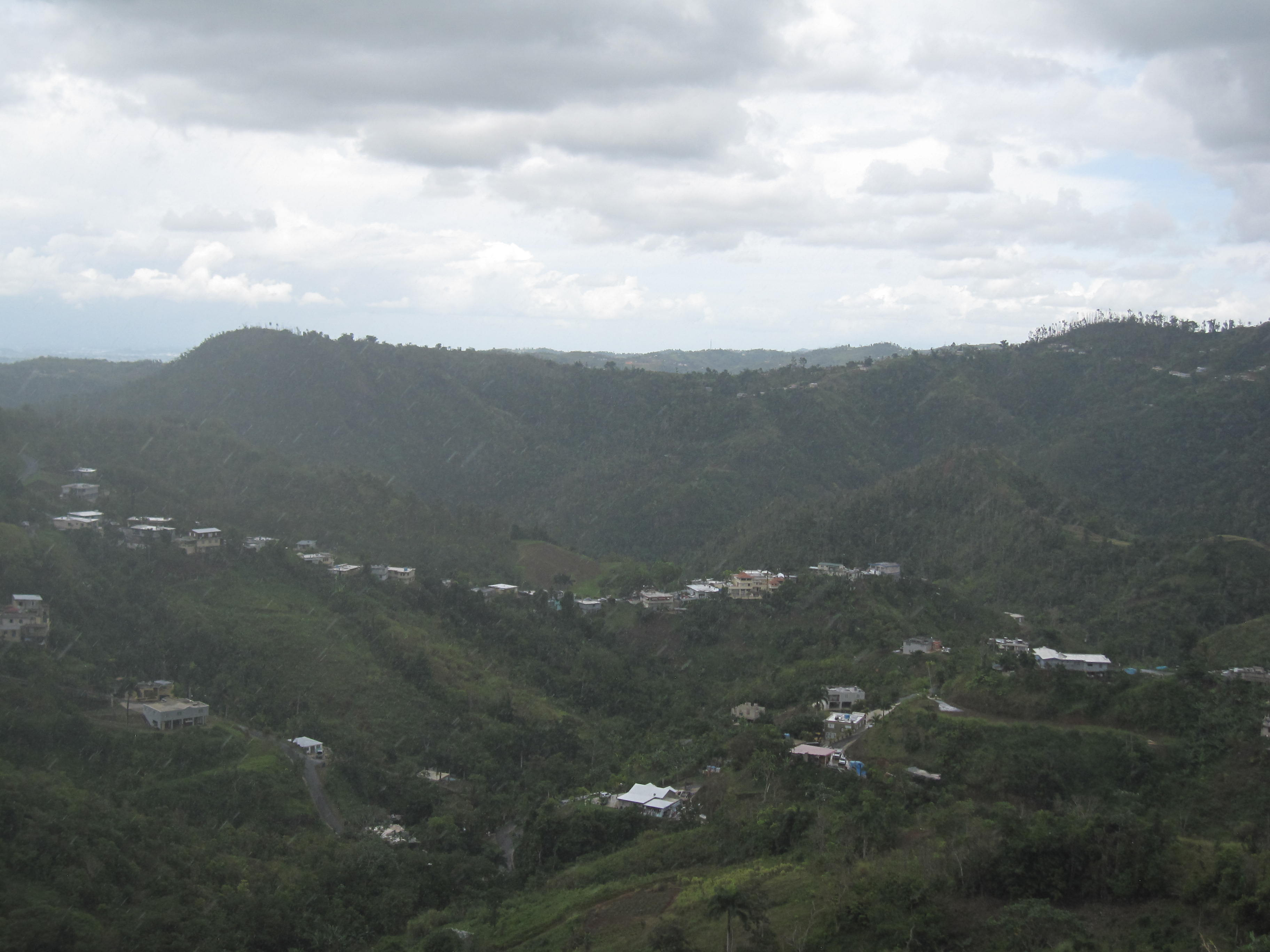
View of Barrio Gato from a lookout on PR-155

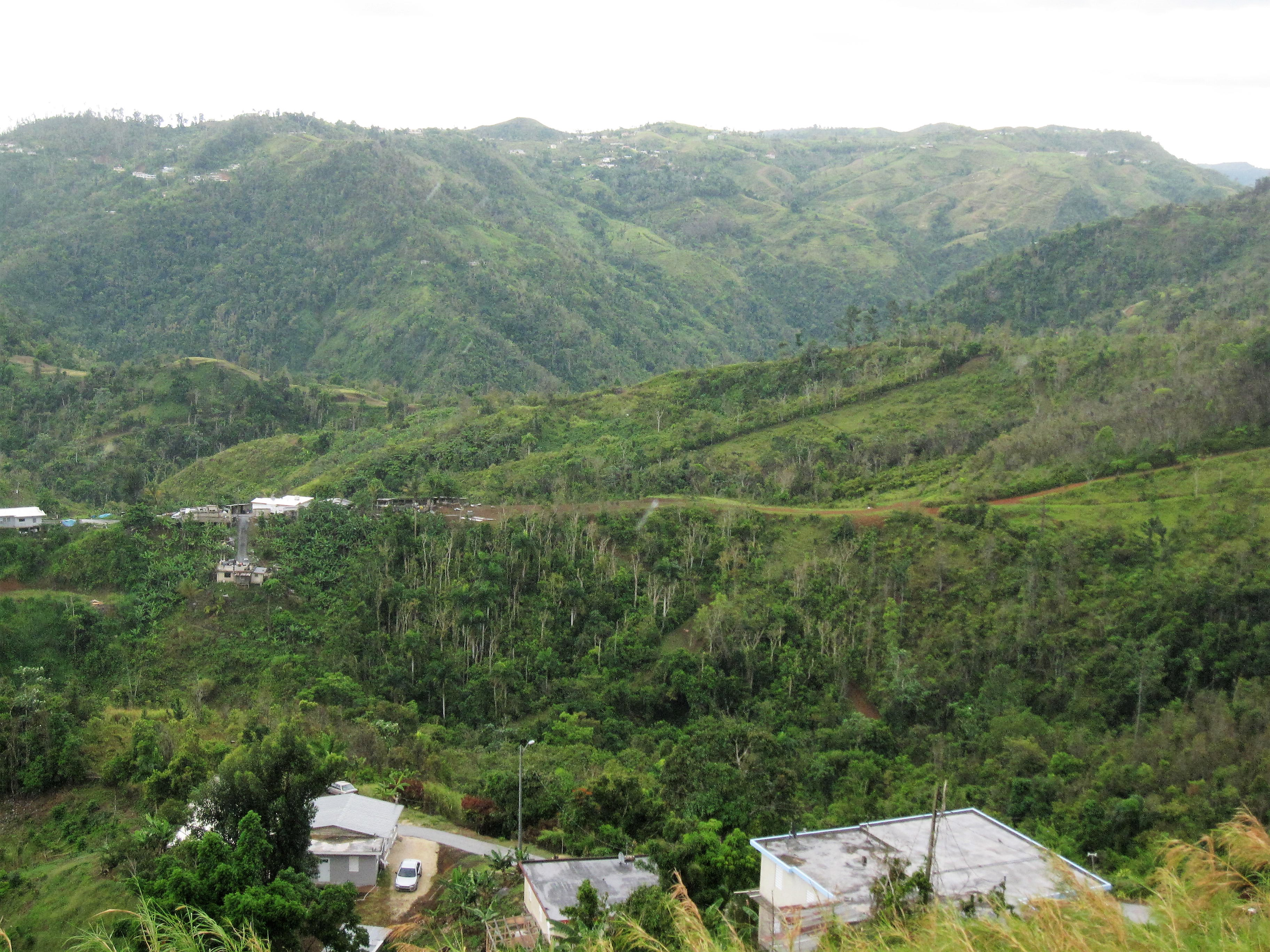
View of La Cordillera Central behind Gato

== See also ==
- List of communities in Puerto Rico
