= Mata de Cañas =

Barrio of Orocovis, Puerto Rico

- Barrio
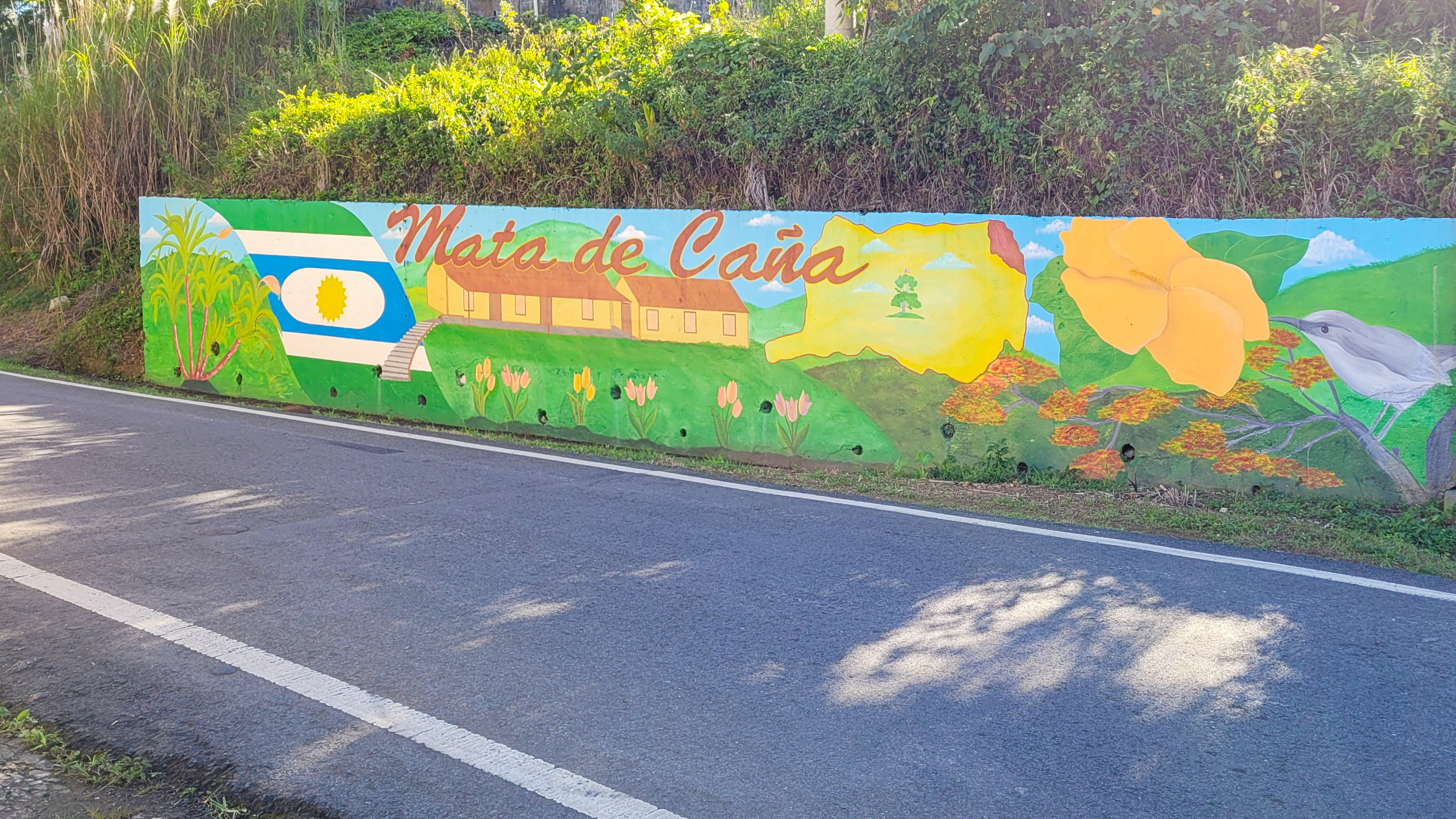
- Mural on Puerto Rico Highway 568 in Mata de Cañas

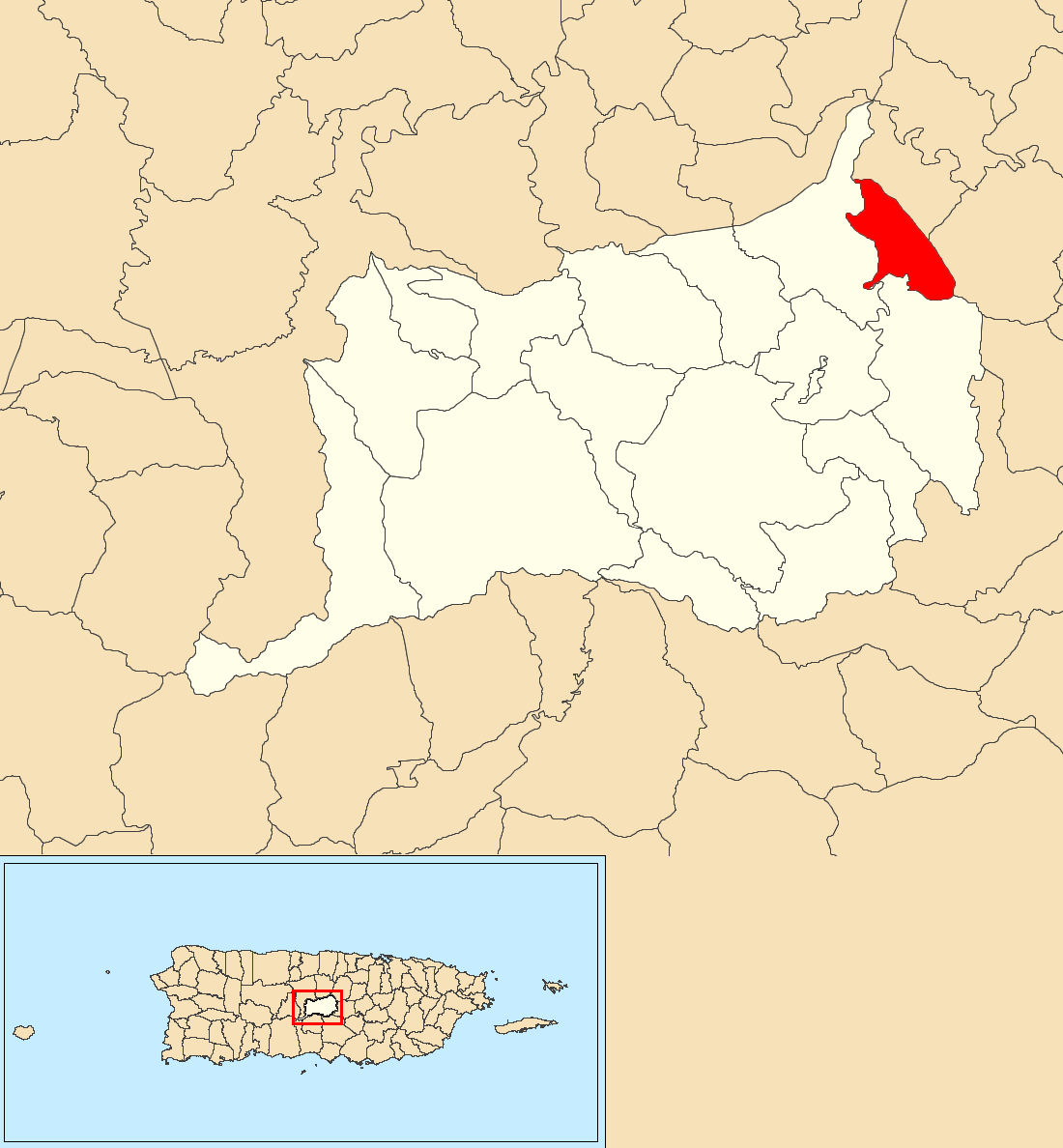
- Location of Mata de Cañas within the municipality of Orocovis shown in red

- Location of Puerto Rico
- Coordinates: 18°15′42″N 66°22′32″W
- Commonwealth: Puerto Rico
- Municipality: Orocovis

Area
  - Total: 1.61 sq mi (4.2 km^{2})
  - Land: 1.61 sq mi (4.2 km^{2})
  - Water: 0 sq mi (0 km^{2})
- Elevation: 2,083 ft (635 m)

Population (2010)
  - Total: 538
  - Density: 334.2/sq mi (129.0/km^{2})
- Source: 2010 Census
- Time zone: UTC−4 (AST)
- ZIP Code: 00720
- Area code: 787/939

Mata de Cañas (or Mata de Caña) is a barrio in the municipality of Orocovis, Puerto Rico. Its population in 2010 was 538.

== Sectors ==
Barrios (which are, in contemporary times, roughly comparable to minor civil divisions) in turn are further subdivided into smaller local populated place areas/units called sectores (sectors in English). The types of sectores may vary, from normally sector to urbanización to reparto to barriada to residencial, among others.

The following sectors are in Mata de Cañas barrio:

Sector Berto Díaz, Sector El Jobo, Sector El Perico, and Sector Sopapo.

== History ==
Mata de Cañas was in Spain's gazetteers until Puerto Rico was ceded by Spain in the aftermath of the Spanish–American War under the terms of the Treaty of Paris of 1898 and became an unincorporated territory of the United States. In 1899, the United States Department of War conducted a census of Puerto Rico finding that the combined population of Mata de Cañas and Sabana barrios was 1,089.

Historical population
Census	Pop.	Note	%±
1910	379		—
1920	501		32.2%
1930	456		−9.0%
1940	549		20.4%
1950	682		24.2%
1960	698		2.3%
1970	573		−17.9%
1980	584		1.9%
1990	516		−11.6%
2000	487		−5.6%
2010	538		10.5%
U.S. Decennial Census; 1900 (N/A) 1910-1930; 1930-1950 1980-2000 2010

== Gallery ==
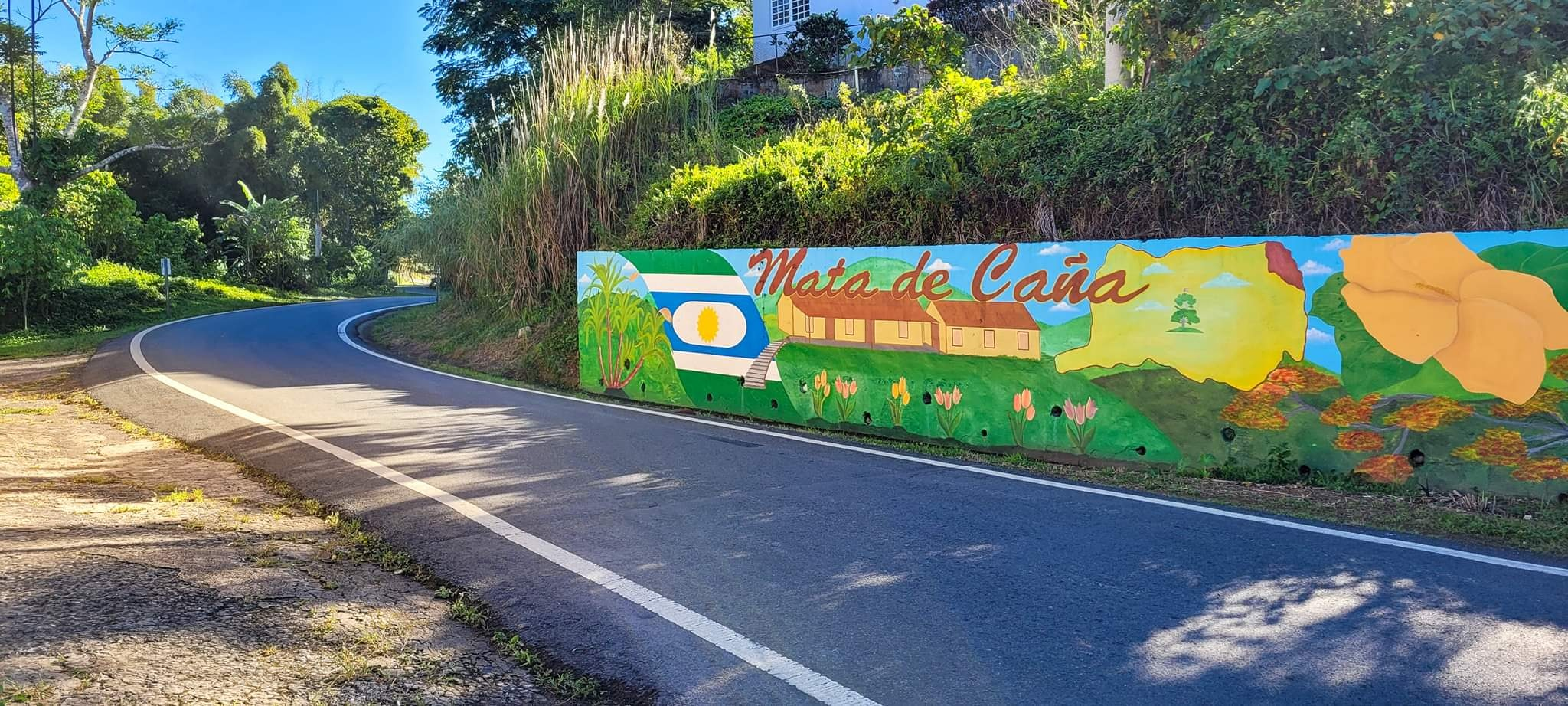
A stretch of Puerto Rico Highway 568 in Mata de Cañas

== See also ==
- List of communities in Puerto Rico
