= Saltos =

Barrio of Orocovis, Puerto Rico

- Barrio
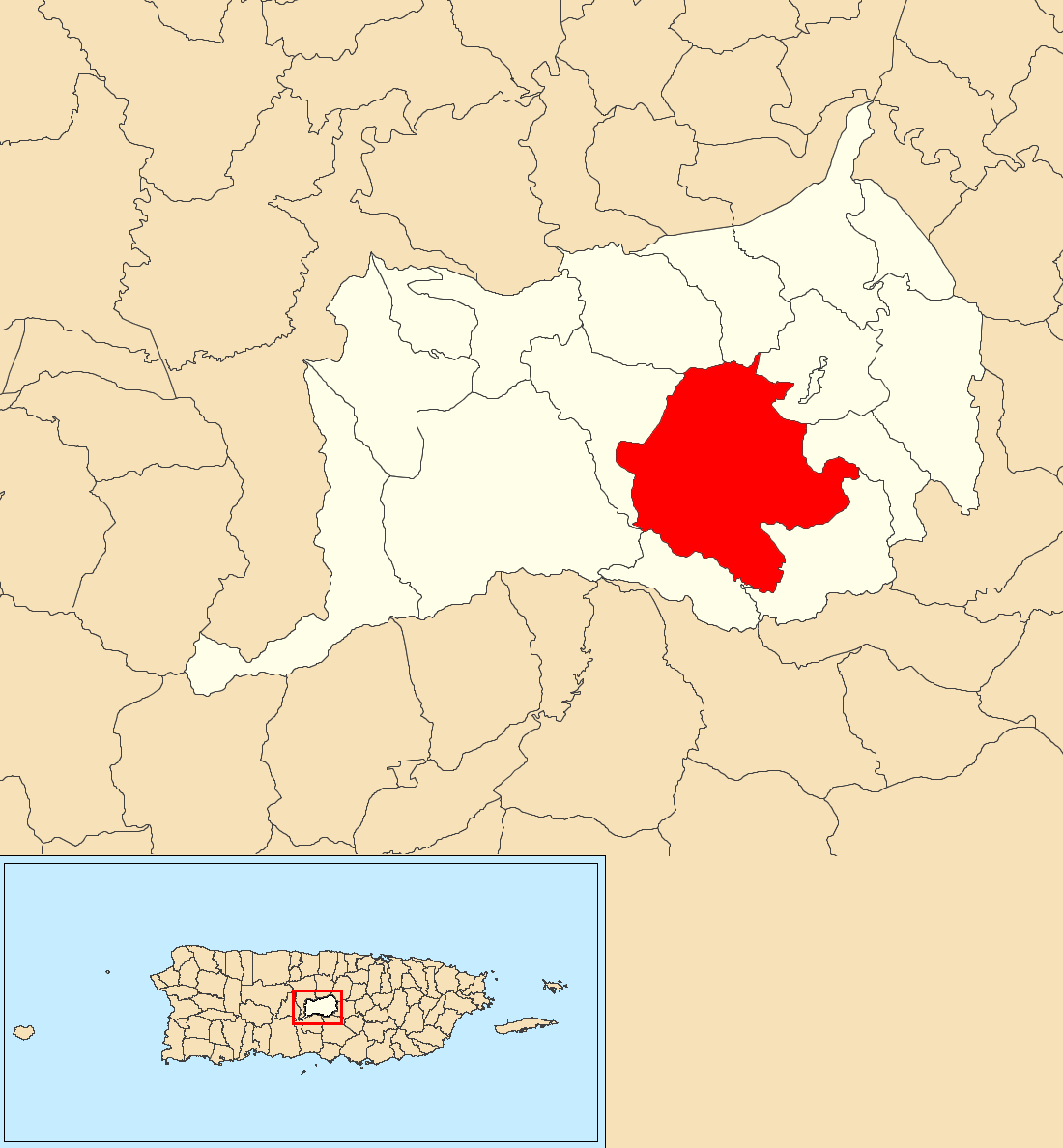
- Location of Saltos within the municipality of Orocovis shown in red

- Location of Puerto Rico
- Coordinates: 18°12′08″N 66°24′46″W
- Commonwealth: Puerto Rico
- Municipality: Orocovis

Area
  - Total: 8.45 sq mi (21.9 km^{2})
  - Land: 8.45 sq mi (21.9 km^{2})
  - Water: 0 sq mi (0 km^{2})
- Elevation: 3,064 ft (934 m)

Population (2010)
  - Total: 3,238
  - Density: 383.2/sq mi (148.0/km^{2})
- Source: 2010 Census
- Time zone: UTC−4 (AST)
- ZIP Code: 00720
- Area code: 787/939

Saltos is a barrio in the municipality of Orocovis, Puerto Rico. Its population in 2010 was 3,238.

== Sectors ==
Barrios (which are, in contemporary times, roughly comparable to minor civil divisions) in turn are further subdivided into smaller local populated place areas/units called sectores (sectors in English). The types of sectores may vary, from normally sector to urbanización to reparto to barriada to residencial, among others.

The following sectors are in Saltos barrio:

Sector Barrio Pellejas I y II, Sector Blandito, Sector Colí, Sector Díaz, Sector El Hoyo, Sector El Jibarito, Sector El Parque,, Sector Felipe Rubero, Sector Félix Medina, Sector Félix Rosado, Sector Gallera, Sector Head Start, Sector La Charca, Sector La Nueva Ola, Sector La Parroquia, Sector La Torrefacción, Sector Las Cabras, Sector Los Alvarado, Sector Los Chorritos, Sector Los Meléndez, Sector Los Mercado, Sector Los Miranda, Sector Los Reyes, Sector Los Suárez, Sector Luis Torres, Sector Luis Sáez, Sector Miraflores, Sector Monchito Colón, Sector Pachín García, Sector Puente Doble, Sector Rafa Colón, Sector Saltos Díaz, Sector Tito Medina, and Sector Vicente Serrano.

== History ==
Saltos was in Spain's gazetteers until Puerto Rico was ceded by Spain in the aftermath of the Spanish–American War under the terms of the Treaty of Paris of 1898 and became an unincorporated territory of the United States. In 1899, the United States Department of War conducted a census of Puerto Rico finding that the population of Saltos barrio was 1,037.

Historical population
Census	Pop.	Note	%±
1900	1,037		—
1910	1,140		9.9%
1920	1,475		29.4%
1930	1,345		−8.8%
1940	1,599		18.9%
1950	1,797		12.4%
1960	2,172		20.9%
1970	2,341		7.8%
1980	2,256		−3.6%
1990	2,646		17.3%
2000	3,293		24.5%
2010	3,238		−1.7%
U.S. Decennial Census; 1899 (shown as 1900) 1910-1930; 1930-1950 1980-2000 2010

== See also ==
- List of communities in Puerto Rico
