= Orocovis, Puerto Rico =

Town and municipality in Puerto Rico

Orocovis Municipio de Orocovis
- Town and Municipality
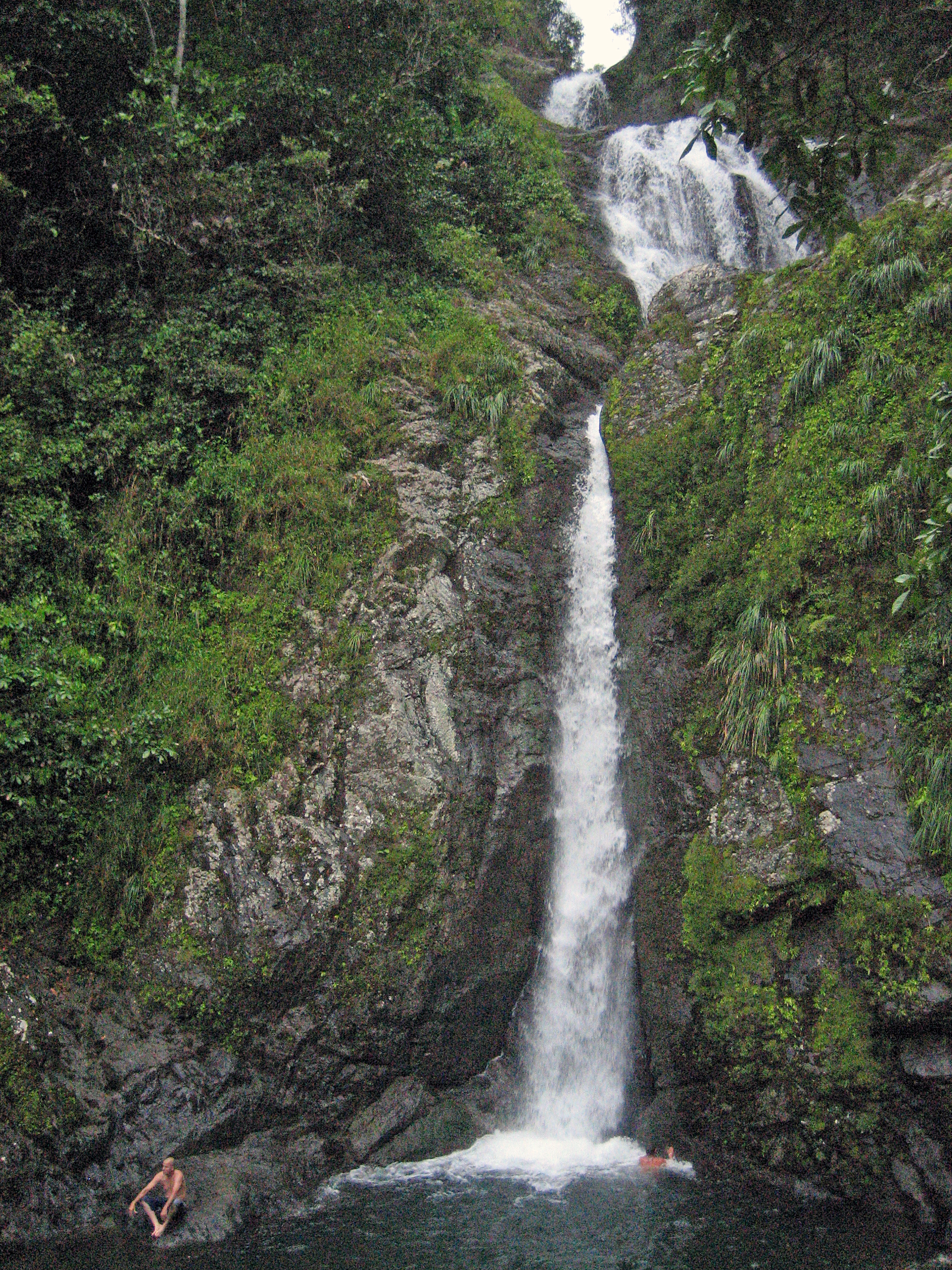
- Salto de Doña Juana waterfall in Orocovis

- Flag Coat of arms
- Nicknames: "Corazón de Puerto Rico", "El Centro Geográfico de Puerto Rico"
- Anthem: "Mi patria es una bella isla"
- Map of Puerto Rico highlighting Orocovis Municipality
- Coordinates: 18°13′37″N 66°23′28″W
- Commonwealth: Puerto Rico
- Founded: November 10, 1825
- Founder: Juan Rivera de Santiago
- Barrios: 17 barrios: Ala de la Piedra; Barros; Bauta Abajo; Bauta Arriba; Bermejales; Botijas; Cacaos; Collores; Damián Abajo; Damián Arriba; Gato; Mata de Cañas; Orocovis; Orocovis barrio-pueblo; Pellejas; Sabana; Saltos

Government
  - Mayor: Jesús E. Colón Berlingeri (PNP)
  - Senatorial dist.: 5 - Ponce
  - Representative dist.: 26

Area
  - Total: 71.11 sq mi (184.17 km^{2})
  - Land: 71 sq mi (184 km^{2})
  - Water: 0.066 sq mi (0.17 km^{2})

Population (2020)
  - Total: 21,434
  - Estimate (2025): 21,329 ▼
  - Rank: 58th in Puerto Rico
  - Density: 302/sq mi (116/km^{2})
- Demonym: Orocoveños
- Time zone: UTC-4 (AST)
- ZIP Code: 00720
- Area code: 787/939
- Website: www.orocovispr.org

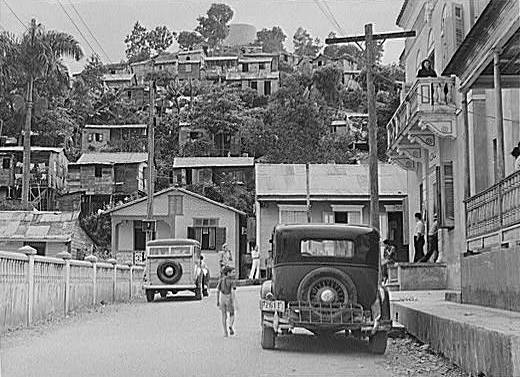
Near the main plaza, 1941

Orocovis (Spanish pronunciation: [oɾoˈkoβis], locally [oɾoˈkoβiʔ]; from the Taino chief Orocovis) is a town and municipality of Puerto Rico located in the center of the island. Founded by Juan Rivera de Santiago in 1825. Orocovis is spread over 17 barrios. It is part of the San Juan-Caguas-Guaynabo Metropolitan Statistical Area. It's located north of Villalba and Coamo; south of Morovis and Corozal; southeast of Ciales; east of Jayuya; and west of Barranquitas

== History ==
Since before the Spanish colonization in the 16th century, the Taíno were already established in the region. They were led by the cacique Orocobix and his tribe known as the Jatibonicu. After Spaniards settled in the island, the region was part of the south of Manatí and the north region of Coamo. By 1823 Orocovis was a barrio of Barranquitas while Morovis (previously part of Manatí) had a barrio called Barros. Both Orocovis and Barros were eventually united to establish a new town.

In early 1825, Juan Rivera de Santiago sought and obtained legal power by the neighbors of the region to request the Governor authorization to found a municipality in the Barros area, where they had bought 14 acres of land from Eulalia (Olaya) de Rivera Melendez, who donated an additional acre to establish several municipal works. However, due to the distance from bodies of water, the settlement was moved to another place where it is today. On November 10, 1825, Governor Miguel de la Torre granted permission to found the new municipality of Barros.

In 1838, the parish of San Juan Bautista de Barros was created and was blessed and inaugurated on October 29 of the same year. However, in 1875, a fire destroyed the church, the King's House, the priest's house and several homes.

Most of Orocovis' nicknames stem from its location in the center of the island. Some of them are: "Corazón de Puerto Rico" (Heart of Puerto Rico) and "Centro Geográfico de Puerto Rico" (Geographical Center of Puerto Rico). Locals say the center of Puerto Rico is in a barrio called Pellejas, on Road 566, Km 5.7 in Orocovis. That the center of Puerto Rico is in front of the Catholic church was determined to be false by engineers from the University of Puerto Rico, Mayagüez Campus.

Puerto Rico was ceded by Spain in the aftermath of the Spanish–American War under the terms of the Treaty of Paris of 1898 and became a territory of the United States. In 1899, the United States Department of War conducted a census of Puerto Rico finding that the population of Barros, as Orocovis was then called, was 14,845.

In 1928, the Legislative Assembly of Puerto Rico approved a resolution to change the name of Barros to Orocovis, to honor the Taíno cacique of the same name, who lived in that region.

== Geography ==
The municipality of Orocovis is mountainous with many valleys. Most of the Orocovis terrain runs through the Cordillera Central of the island. Most of the high peaks are in the southern region of the municipality within the limits of the municipality with Villalba and Coamo. The highest point within the municipality of Orocovis is as unnamed slope of Cerro Maravilla (its peak itself, located outside Orocovis) at 3,396 feet (or 1,200 meters) high, while the highest summit within the municipality is Cerro El Bolo, in the municipal boundary with Villalba. The highest peak in the vicinity of Orocovis Pueblo (the town of Orocovis itself) is Cerro Mogote.

The rivers Toro Negro, Sana Muertos, Orocovis, Matrullas, and Bauta, and the creeks Doña Juana, Palmar and Cacaos are among the water bodies in the town. There are two lakes: El Guineo, a reservoir of the Toro Negro River, and the Matrullas Lake formed by the Bauta River. El Guineo is Puerto Rico's highest lake.

=== Barrios ===
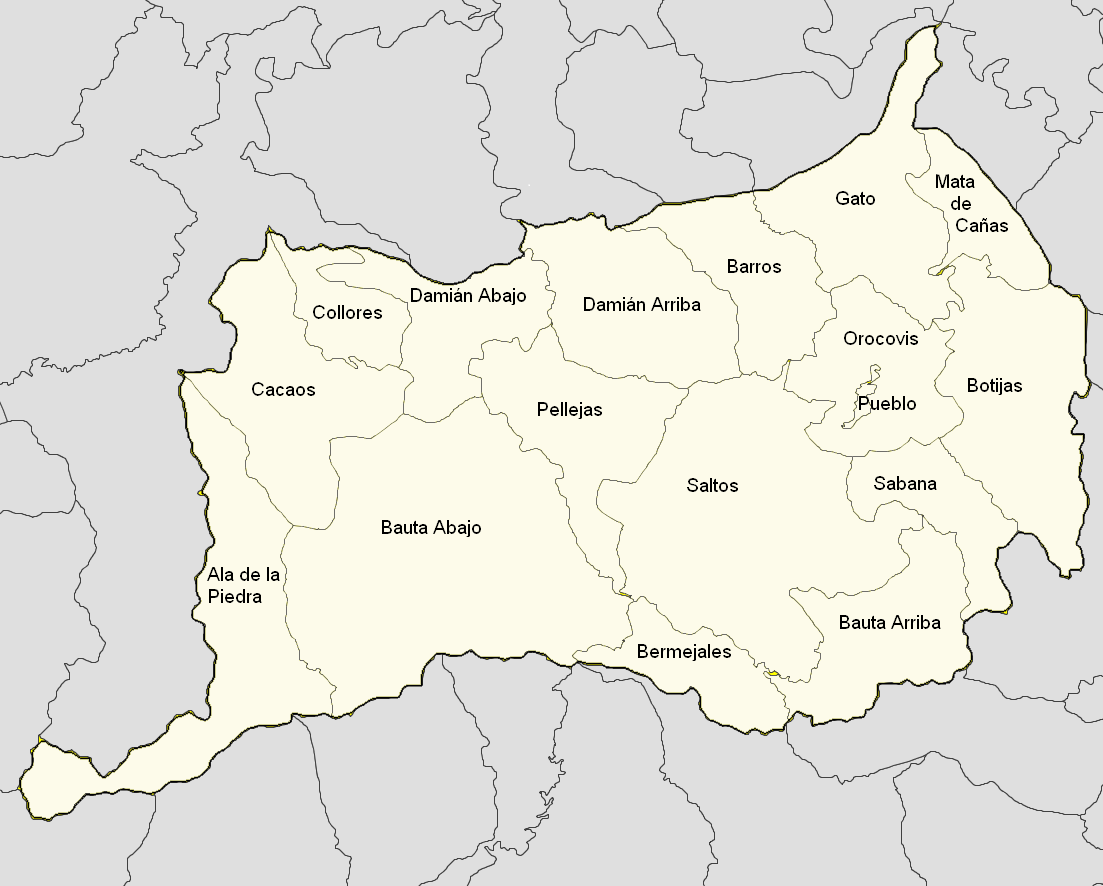
Subdivisions of Orocovis.

Like all municipalities of Puerto Rico, Orocovis is subdivided into barrios. The municipal buildings, central square and large Catholic church are located in a barrio referred to as "el pueblo".

1. Barros
2. Orocovis
3. Pueblo
4. Ala de la Piedra
5. Bauta Abajo
6. Bauta Arriba
7. Bermejales
8. Botijas
9. Cacaos
10. Collores
11. Damián Abajo
12. Damián Arriba
13. Gato
14. Mata de Cañas
15. Pellejas
16. Sabana
17. Saltos

=== Sectors ===
Barrios (which are, in contemporary times, roughly comparable to minor civil divisions) and subbarrios, are further subdivided into smaller areas called sectores (sectors in English). The types of sectores may vary, from normally sector to urbanización to reparto to barriada to residencial, among others.

=== Special Communities ===
Comunidades Especiales de Puerto Rico (Special Communities of Puerto Rico) are marginalized communities whose citizens are experiencing a certain amount of social exclusion. A map shows these communities occur in nearly every municipality of the commonwealth. Of the 742 places that were on the list in 2014, the following barrios, communities, sectors, or neighborhoods were in Orocovis: Ala de la Piedra, Alturas de Orocovis, Cacao, Sector Parcelas in Botijas 1, Botijas II, Comunidad Miraflores and La Pica (Luis M. Alfaro).

== Energy consortium ==
An Energy Consortium was signed in late February, 2019 by Villalba, Orocovis, Morovis, Ciales and Barranquitas municipalities. The consortium is the first of its kind for the island. It is intended to have municipalities work together to safeguard and create resilient, and efficient energy networks, with backups for their communities.

== Culture ==
=== "The Musical Capital of Puerto Rico" ===
Orocovis is sometimes called "The Musical Capital of Puerto Rico" because many major Puerto Rican performers were either born or raised in the town, particularly bandleader Bobby Valentín, folk singer Andrés Jiménez, merengue singer Manny Manuel, salsa legend William "H. Christ" Corchado, and the Colón-Zayas family of musicians, which includes Emma (singer, multi-instrumentalist) and Edwin (a cuatro player).

=== Santo (art figurines) ===
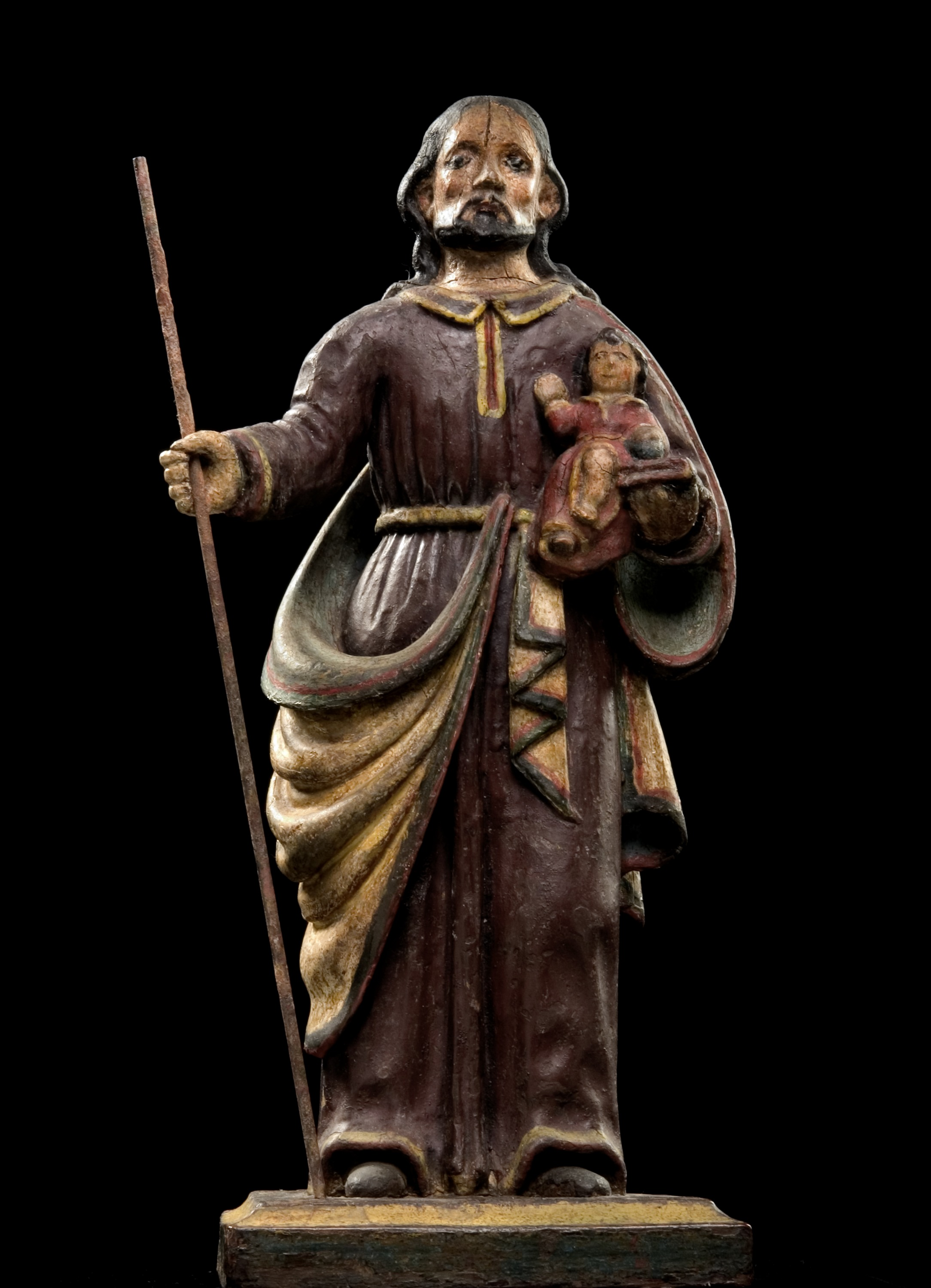
Santo by Tiburcio de la Espada from San Germán, Puerto Rico

Celestino Avilés Meléndez (1925-2004), a santero from Orocovis, saved the dying art from his workshop. Santeros are folk artists who create wooden, religious statuettes called Santos. The folk artists were dispersed around Puerto Rico and were few in number. Avilés' initiative, in 1983, for santeros to meet continues to this day with the Encuentro Nacional de Santeros taking place in Orocovis, the third week in December annually. Also, Avilés' establishing the Museo Orocoveño Familia Avilés Inc. in 1982, a museum for santeros art, revived the culture and art of santeros and santos and by 2019, there were more than 300 santeros making santos in Puerto Rico.

=== Tourism ===
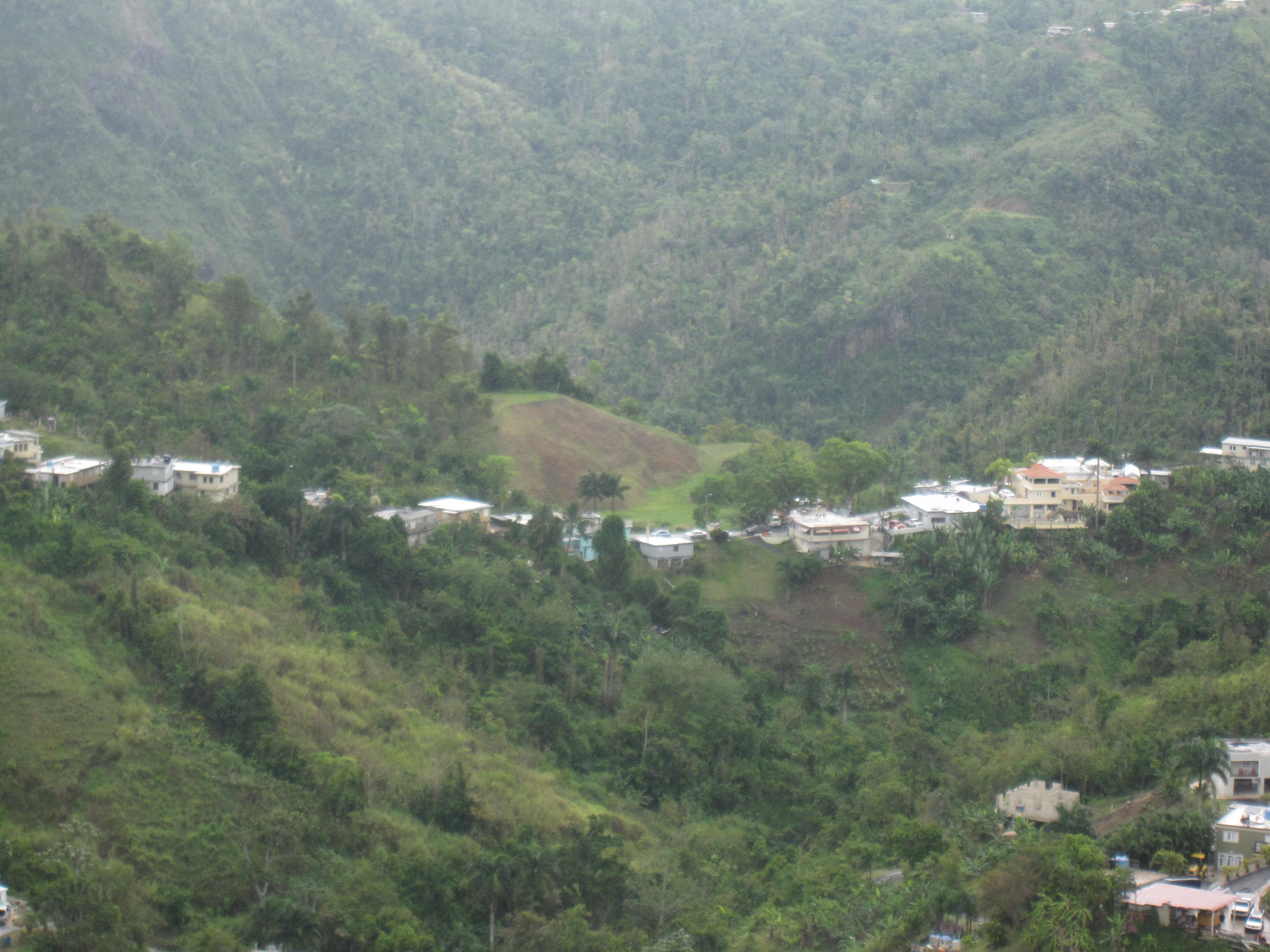
View of Orocovis from lookout in Orocovis

- Bosque Estatal de Toro Negro
- Las Piscinas del Area Recreativa Doña Juana (Doña Juana Pool, Spring Water and Recreative Park)
- Área Recreativa de Damián (Recreative park of Damian)
- Ríos (rivers)
- Vistas Panorámicas (panoramic views)

=== Landmarks and places of interest ===
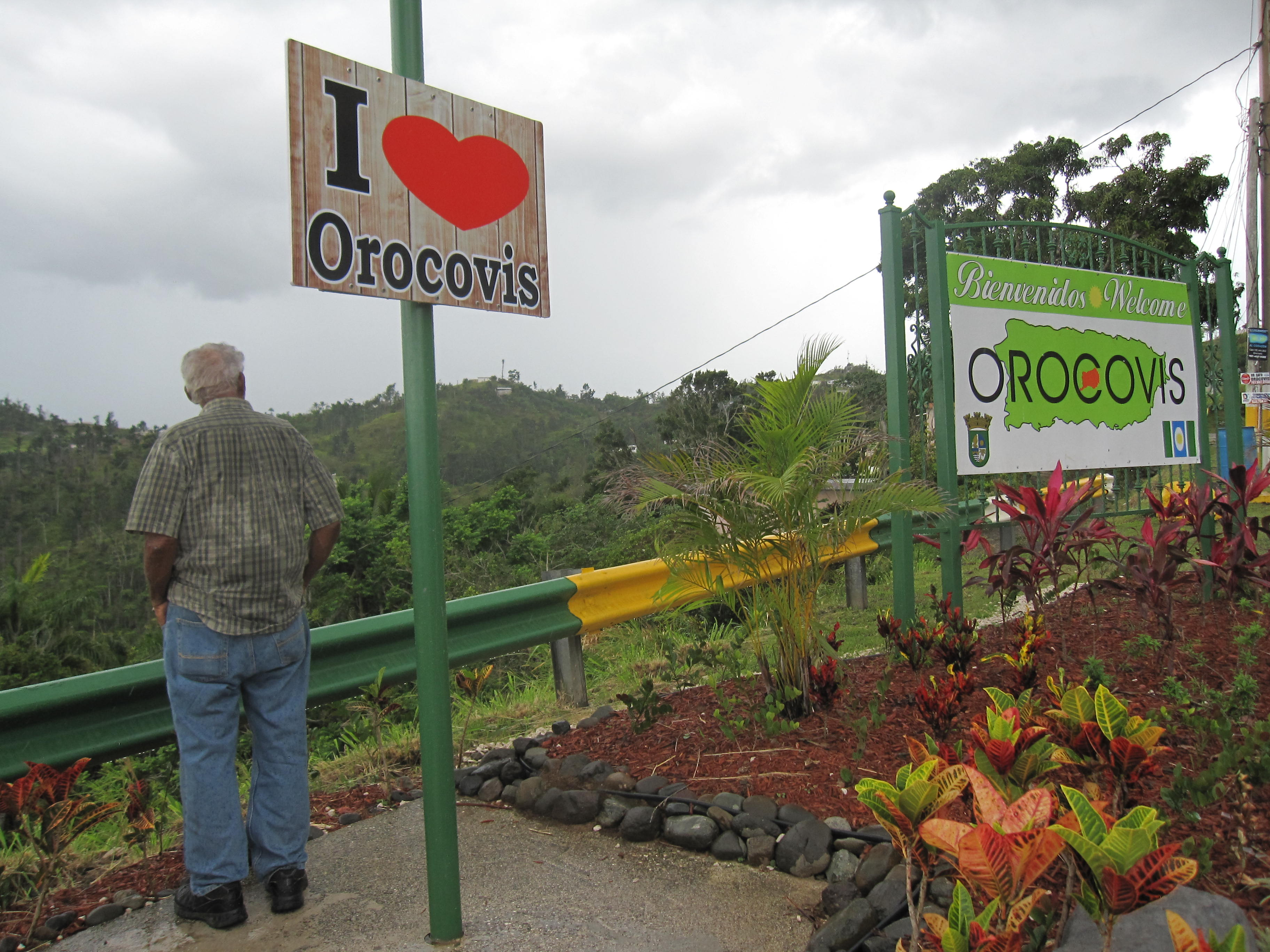
Lookout in Orocovis, Puerto Rico

- Indian Cave
- Matrullas Lake
- El Guineo Lake
- Orocovis Museum
- Taíno Refuge
- Mirador Villalba - Orocovis
- Toro Negro State Forest
- Área Recreativa Cerro La Guaira (Recreative Park)
- Cascada Chorro de Doña Juana

=== Festivals and events ===
Orocovis celebrates its patron saint festival in June. The Fiestas Patronales de San Juan Bautista is a religious and cultural celebration that generally features parades, games, artisans, amusement rides, regional food, and live entertainment.

Other festivals and events celebrated in Orocovis include:

- Children's Theater Festival – April
- Shrimp Festival – July
- Artisan Fair – September
- Youth Festival – October
- Puerto Rican National Meat Pie Festival – November

== Economy ==
=== Agriculture ===
Cattle, coffee, fruits, tobacco, and wheat. A young business growing hydroponics lettuce was in negotiations to be a supplier for Walmart in 2019.

=== Industrial ===
Several small nutritional product industries.

== Demographics ==
Historical population
Census	Pop.	Note	%±
1900	14,845		—
1910	15,028		1.2%
1920	15,758		4.9%
1930	16,115		2.3%
1940	19,770		22.7%
1950	21,181		7.1%
1960	20,362		−3.9%
1970	20,201		−0.8%
1980	19,332		−4.3%
1990	21,158		9.4%
2000	23,844		12.7%
2010	23,423		−1.8%
2020	21,434		−8.5%
2025 (est.)	21,329	▼	−0.5%
U.S. Decennial Census; 1899 (shown as 1900) 1910-1930; 1930-1950 1960-2000 2010 2020

According to the 2000 census, Orocovis has a population of 23,844 with a population density is 378.4 people per square mile (145.5/km^{2}). Although there was a decline in the population during the 1980s, it has steadily increased during the last decades.

Statistics taken from the 2000 census shows that 81.4% of Orocoveños have Spanish or White origin, 4.1% are black, 0.4% are Amerindian etc.

Race - Orocovis, Puerto Rico - 2000 Census
Race	Population	% of Total
White	19,401	81.4%
Black/African American	975	4.1%
American Indian and Alaska Native	87	0.4%
Asian	15	0.1%
Native Hawaiian/Pacific Islander	5	0.0%
Some other race	2,618	11.0%
Two or more races	743	3.1%

== Government ==
All municipalities in Puerto Rico are administered by a mayor, elected every four years. Jesús Colón Berlingeri (of the New Progressive Party) has served as mayor since 1998.

The city belongs to the Puerto Rico Senatorial district VI, which is represented by two Senators. In 2024, Rafael Santos Ortiz and Wilmer Reyes Berríos were elected as District Senators.

== Education ==
Orocovis has several public and private schools and public education is administered by the Puerto Rico Department of Education.

== Transportation ==
There is no direct highway connection to Orocovis. Roads #137 and #155 lead from the north, while roads #138 and #155 lead from the south. Orocovis lies at about an hour and a half from San Juan, the capital of Puerto Rico.

There are 17 bridges in Orocovis.

== Symbols ==
The municipio has an official flag and coat of arms.

=== Flag of Orocovis ===
The Flag of Orocovis is formed by five vertical stripes: Two green stripes at the ends, representing the territories of Aibonito and Barranquitas; and a blue one in the center representing the regional domain of the cacique Orocobix prior to the Spanish colonization. These stripes are divided by two narrower white stripes, representing the territories granted by Barranquitas and Morovis to form the municipality in 1825.

Over the blue portion there's an oval with a Sun. The Sun has seventeen rays that represent the different regions of the town. The Sun, being the center of the Solar System, represents Orocovis as the center of the island of Puerto Rico.

=== Coat of arms ===
The oval is symbol of the letter "O", initial of the name of the town. In each quadrant appear representative elements of the town. In the left superior quadrant a Taíno Indian bust, symbol of the great "Chief Orocobix" and the Indian heritage of the town, silhouetted in gold on a silver-plated background. The Indian bust faces to the star or sun that appears in the superior right quadrant, which is in gold on a blue background and represents the territorial municipality with its seventeen rays or demarcations. In the inferior right quadrant, a plantain plant is observed representing the agriculture, silhouetted in gold on a silver-plated background. A bridge also silhouetted in gold on a blue background, above the river appears in the left inferior quadrant.

== See also ==
- List of Puerto Ricans
- History of Puerto Rico
- Did you know-Puerto Rico?
- Orocovis Sign Language
