= List of barrios and sectors of Orocovis, Puerto Rico =

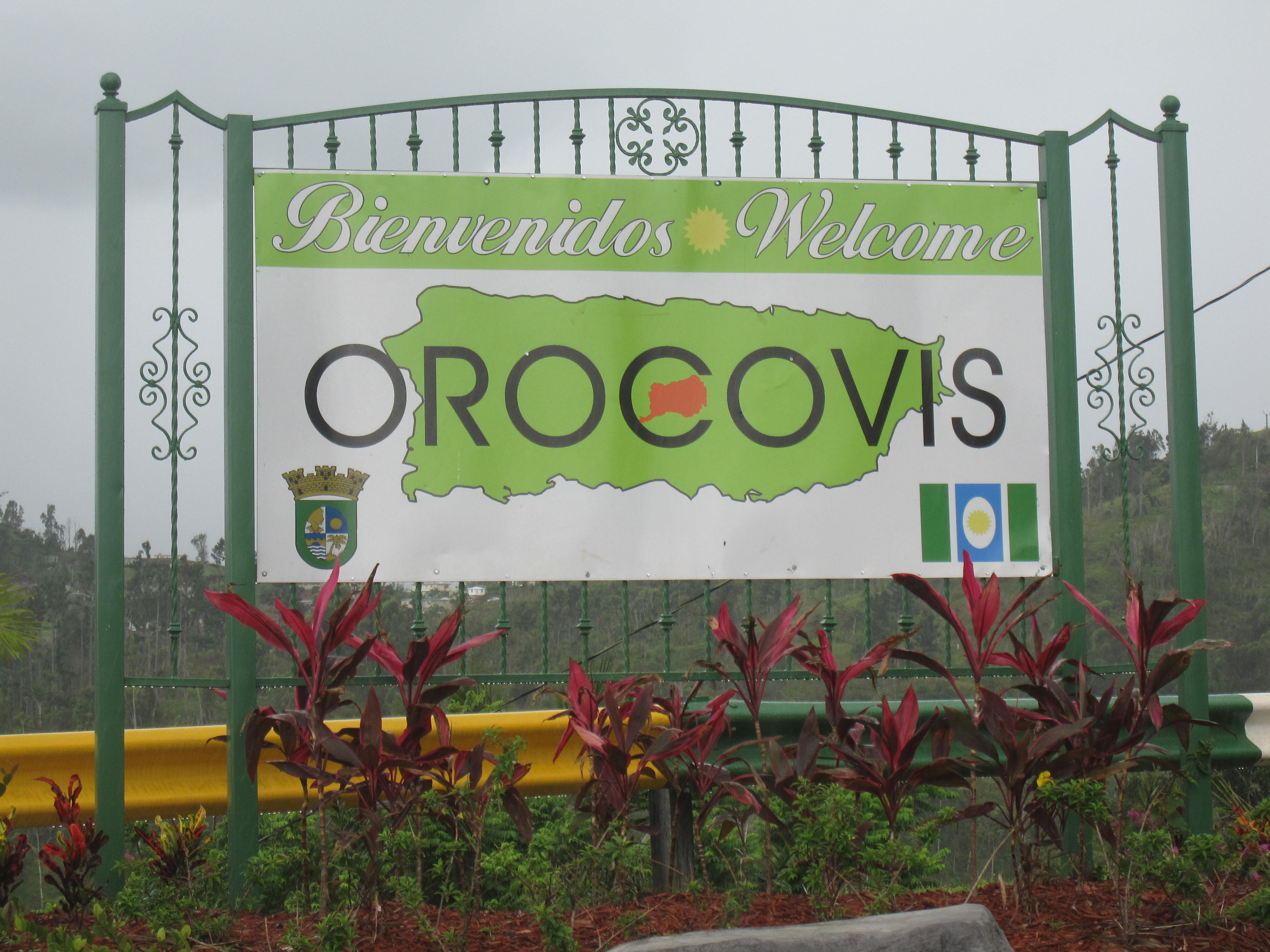
Welcome to Orocovis sign on PR-155

Like all municipalities of Puerto Rico, Orocovis is subdivided into administrative units called barrios, which are, in contemporary times, roughly comparable to minor civil divisions. The barrios and subbarrios, in turn, are further subdivided into smaller local populated place areas/units called sectores (sectors in English). The types of sectores may vary, from normally sector to urbanización to reparto to barriada to residencial, among others. Some sectors appear in two barrios.

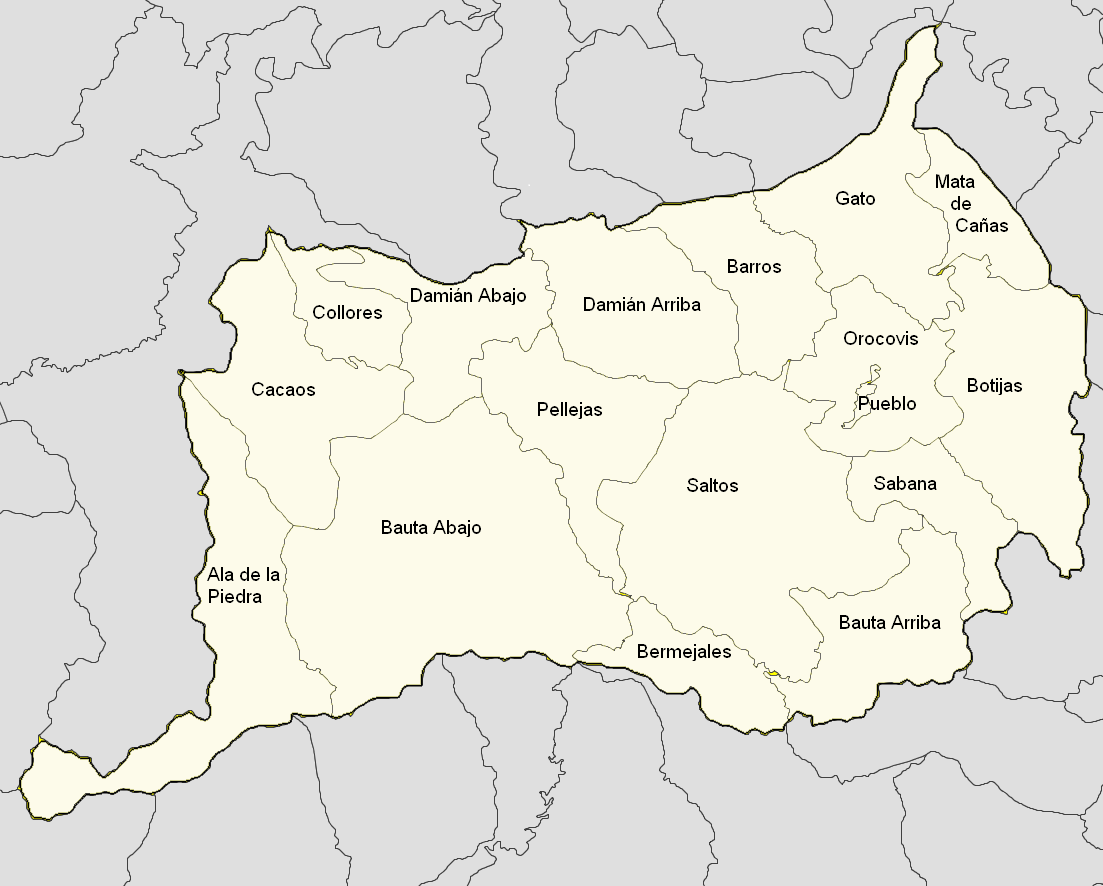
Orocovis map

== List of sectors by barrio ==
=== Ala de la Piedra ===
- Sector Divisoria
- Sector Doña Juana
- Sector El Frío
- Sector El Guineo
- Sector La Torre

=== Barros ===
- Sector Camilo Meléndez
- Sector Doña Lala
- Sector Enrique Pérez
- Sector La Familia
- Sector La Loma
- Sector La Vaquería
- Sector Las Estancias
- Sector Limones
- Sector Los Hernández
- Sector Los Rivera
- Sector Monte Bello
- Sector Sanamuertos

=== Bauta Abajo ===
- Sector El Cementerio
- Sector El Lago
- Sector Guaraguaíto
- Sector La Escuela
- Sector La Francia
- Sector La Muela
- Sector La Sierra
- Sector Matrullas
- Sector San Miguel
- Sector Taita
- Sector Toñingo

=== Bauta Arriba ===
- Sector Bauta Centro
- Sector Don Pei
- Sector Eduino Hernández
- Sector El Tropical
- Sector Garage Diego
- Sector Jesús Meléndez
- Sector La Aldea
- Sector La Escuela
- Sector Los Marrero
- Sector Los Meléndez
- Sector Los Rivas
- Sector Luis Sáez
- Sector Puente Doble
- Sector Sixto Rivera Jr.

=== Bermejales ===
- Sector Buena Vista
- Sector El Aguacate
- Sector El Collao
- Sector El Cometa
- Sector El Mirador
- Sector La Cuchilla
- Sector Tino Torres

=== Botijas ===
Although Botijas officially consists of only one single barrio, it is traditionally subdivided into two areas or sub-barrios:

=== Botijas I ===
- Sector El Puente
- Sector El Quenepo
- Sector La Curva
- Sector La Loma
- Sector La Revés
- Sector Las Parcelas
- Sector Manuel Cartagena

=== Botijas II ===
- Sector Casablanca
- Sector El Cruce de Mayo
- Sector El Molino
- Sector El Puente (La Botija de Oro)
- Sector Guillo Colón
- Sector La Escuela
- Sector La Médica
- Sector La Recta
- Sector Las Marías
- Sector Las Parcelas
- Sector Los Morales
- Sector Los Sandoval
- Sector Manuel Berríos
- Sector Pello Pagán
- Sector Rabanal

=== Cacaos ===
- Sector Cacaos
- Sector Cacaos Alturita
- Sector Cacaos Centro
- Sector Hacienda
- Sector Parcelas Sapia

=== Collores ===
There are no sectors in Collores barrio.

=== Damián Abajo ===
- Sector Área Recreativa
- Sector Camilo Meléndez
- Sector Canta Sapo
- Sector Culebras
- Sector El Granillín
- Sector El Puente
- Sector El Verde
- Sector Gregorio
- Sector La Escuela
- Sector La Frontera
- Sector La Hacienda
- Sector La Luna
- Sector Las Palmas
- Sector Los Muros
- Sector Meseta
- Sector Palma Gorda
- Sector Pedro Morales
- Sector Román Díaz
- Sector Taita
- Sector Vitín Medina

=== Damián Arriba ===
There are no sectors in Damián Arriba barrio.

=== Gato ===
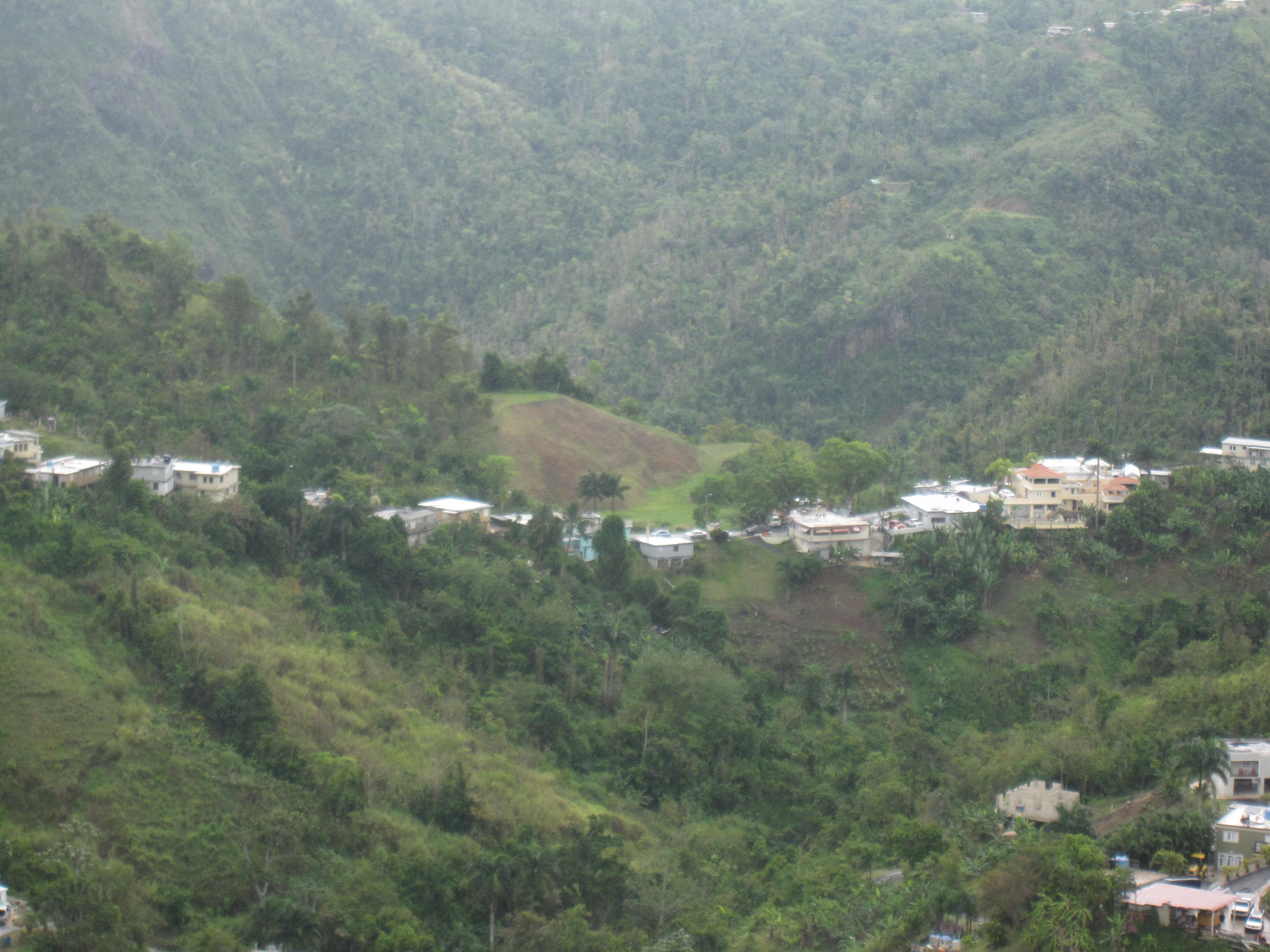
View of Gato

- Sector Bajuras
- Sector Bolívar Pagán
- Sector Doña Ofelia (El Radar)
- Sector El Campesino
- Sector El Naranjo
- Sector El Soldadito
- Sector El Zapato
- Sector Gato I
- Sector Gato II
- Sector La Capilla
- Sector La Loma
- Sector Lile Fortis
- Sector Los López

=== Mata de Cañas ===
- Sector Berto Díaz
- Sector El Jobo
- Sector El Perico
- Sector Sopapo

=== Orocovis ===
- Residencial Orocovix
- Sector A.F.D.A.
- Sector Celso Bonilla
- Sector Colinas del Pueblo
- Sector Cruce de Mayo
- Sector Cruz Aponte
- Sector Doña Celerina
- Sector El Cementerio
- Sector El Flamboyán
- Sector El Pueblito
- Sector El Puente
- Sector Emilio Rivas
- Sector Julio Aponte
- Sector La Fraternidad
- Sector La Pizzería
- Sector La Sombra
- Sector La Vega
- Sector Las Fábricas
- Sector Las Marianas
- Sector Los Dardanelos
- Sector Monte Bello
- Sector Olmo Rodríguez
- Sector Ricos Place
- Sector Salida a Barranquitas
- Sector Salida a Coamo
- Sector Salida a Corozal
- Sector Salida a Morovis
- Sector Tony Montes
- Sector Villas de Orocovis
- Urbanización Alturas de Orocovis
- Urbanización Santa Teresita
- Urbanización Villa Cooperativa

=== Orocovis barrio-pueblo ===
- Calle Dr. Umpierre
- Calle Hospital
- Calle Las Flores
- Calle Luis M. Alfaro
- Calle Martín Barry
- Calle Pedro Arroyo
- Calle 4 de Julio
- Residencial José Ventura Fortis
- Sector El Acueducto Viejo
- Sector Juan de Rivera y Santiago
- Sector La Colecturía
- Sector La Esso
- Sector La Pica
- Sector La Texaco
- Sector Los Duros
- Sector Salida a Barranquitas
- Sector Salida a Coamo
- Sector Salida a Corozal
- Sector Salida a Morovis
- Sector Salsipuedes

=== Pellejas ===
There are no sectors in Pellejas barrio.

=== Sabana ===
- Sector Chu Vázquez
- Sector Cruce de Mayo
- Sector El Árbol Taíno
- Sector La Cuesta
- Sector La Pista
- Sector La Planta de Gas
- Sector La Vega
- Sector Los Cintrón
- Sector Los Figueroa
- Sector Los Mateo
- Sector Los Meléndez
- Sector Los Negrón
- Sector Los Padilla
- Sector Los Rosado
- Sector Sabana Arriba

=== Saltos ===
- Sector Barrio Pellejas I y II
- Sector Blandito
- Sector Colí
- Sector Díaz
- Sector El Hoyo
- Sector El Jibarito
- Sector El Parque
- Sector Felipe Rubero
- Sector Félix Medina
- Sector Félix Rosado
- Sector Gallera
- Sector Head Start
- Sector La Charca
- Sector La Nueva Ola
- Sector La Parroquia
- Sector La Torrefacción
- Sector Las Cabras
- Sector Los Alvarado
- Sector Los Chorritos
- Sector Los Meléndez
- Sector Los Mercado
- Sector Los Miranda
- Sector Los Reyes
- Sector Los Suárez
- Sector Luis Torres
- Sector Luis Sáez
- Sector Miraflores
- Sector Monchito Colón
- Sector Pachín García
- Sector Puente Doble
- Sector Rafa Colón
- Sector Saltos Díaz
- Sector Tito Medina
- Sector Vicente Serrano

== See also ==
- List of communities in Puerto Rico
