= Puerto Rico Highway 157 =

Highway in Puerto Rico

Highway 157
- Ruta 157

Route information
- Maintained by Puerto Rico DTPW
- Length: 24.3 km (15.1 mi)
- Existed: 1953–present

Major junctions
- West end: PR-149 in Toro Negro
- PR-564 in Cacaos; PR-6615 in Damián Abajo–Collores; PR-567 in Barros–Damián Arriba; PR-566 in Barros
- East end: PR-155 in Orocovis

Location
- Country: United States
- Territory: Puerto Rico
- Municipalities: Ciales, Orocovis

Highway system
- Roads in Puerto Rico; List
← PR-156	→ PR-158

Puerto Rico Highway 157 (PR-157) is a rural road in Puerto Rico that travels from Ciales to Orocovis. It begins at its intersection with PR-149 in Toro Negro and ends at its junction with PR-155 near downtown Orocovis.

Puerto Rico Highway 157

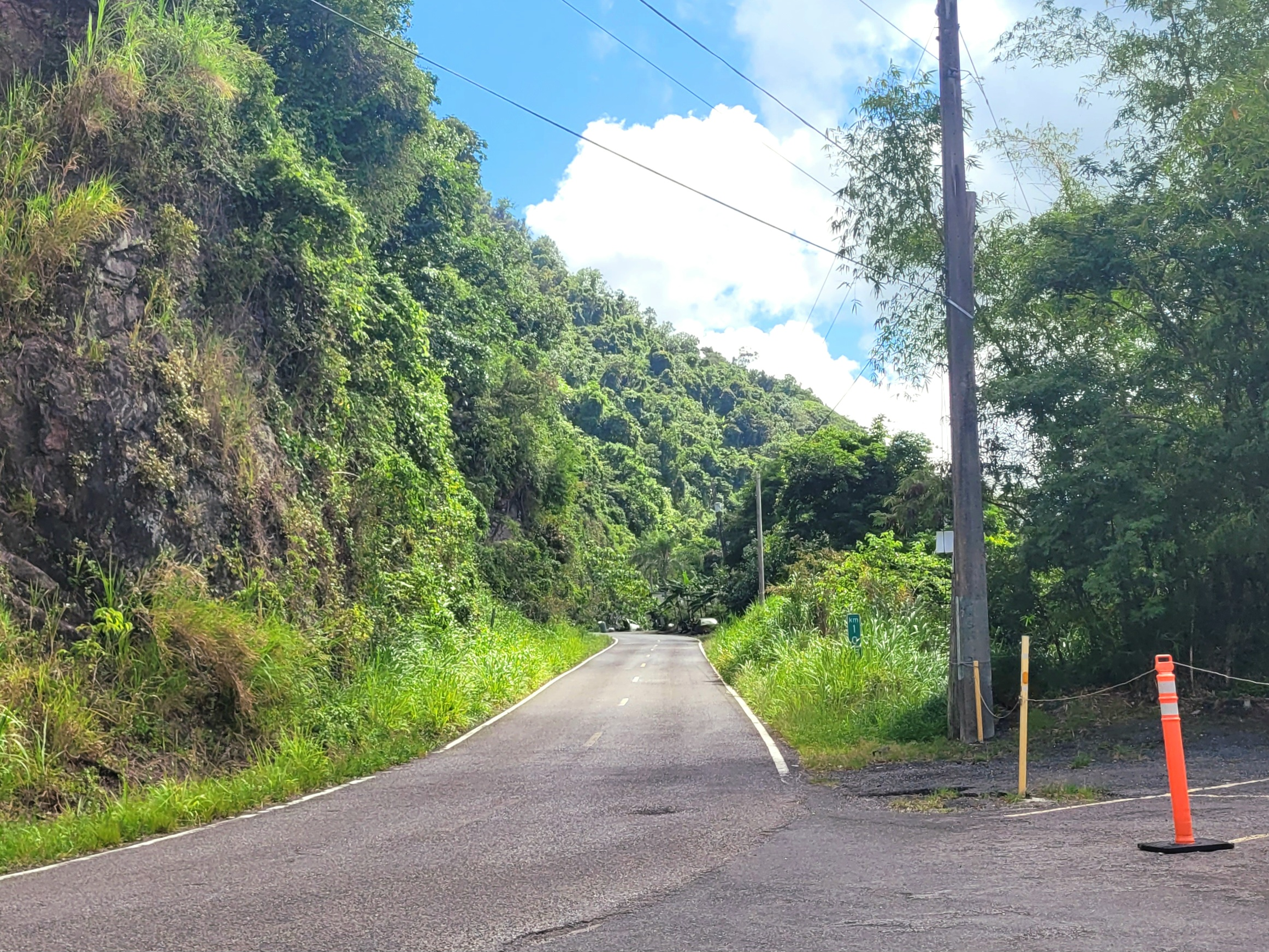
Heading west between Collores and Damián Abajo barrios, Orocovis

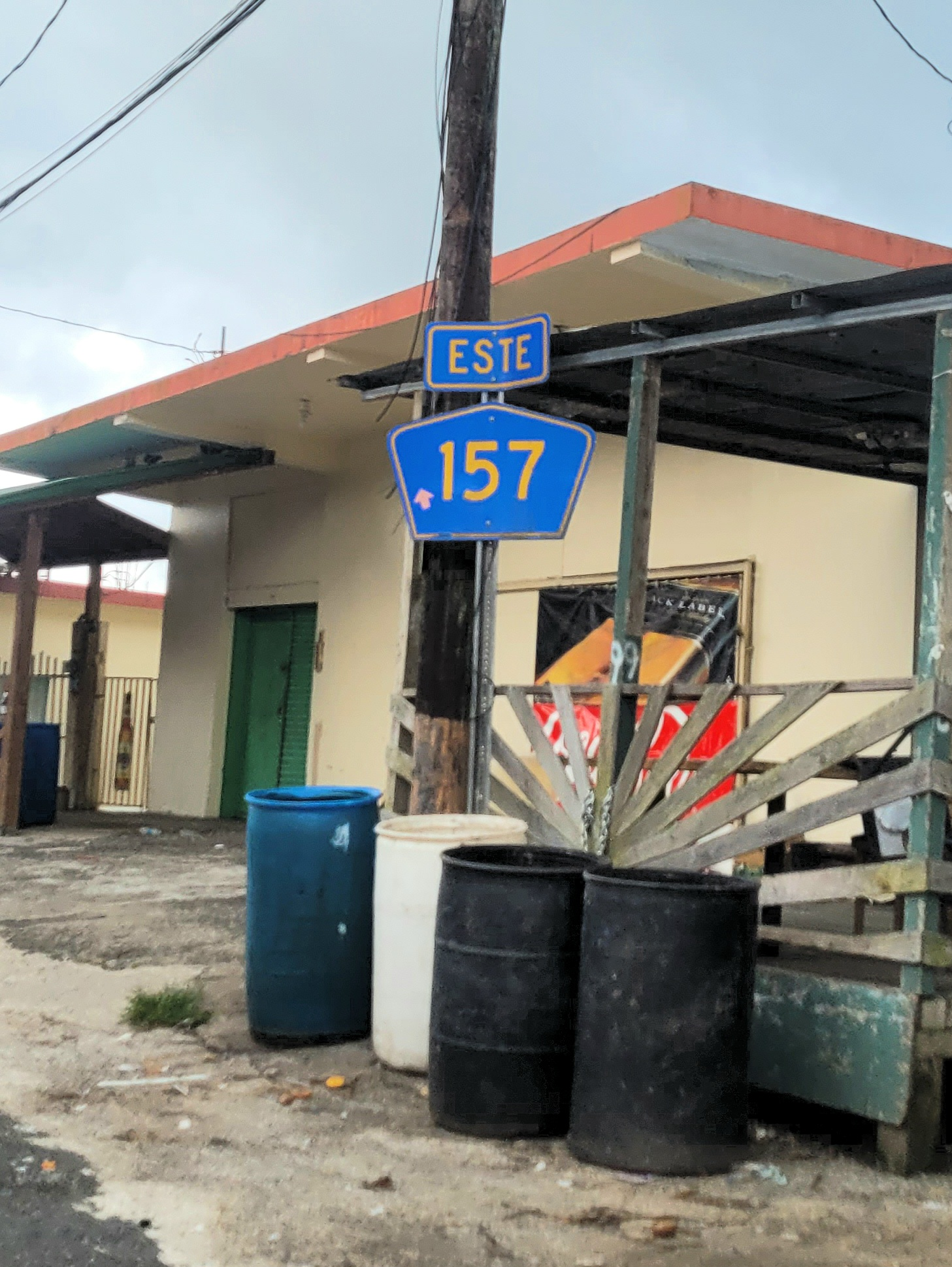
Eastbound sign in Barros, Orocovis

== Major intersections ==
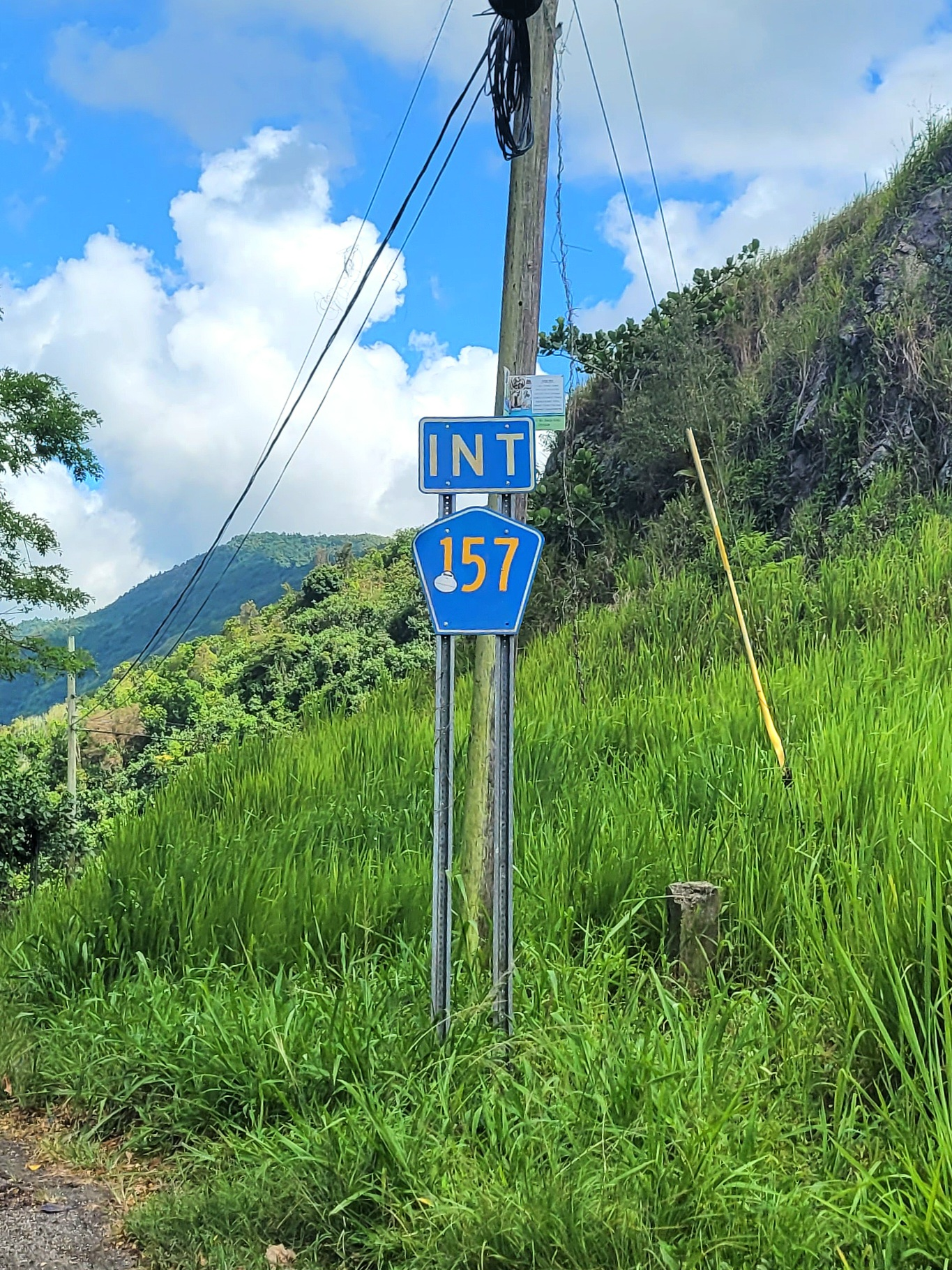
PR-6615 south near PR-157 junction between Collores and Damián Abajo barrios, Orocovis

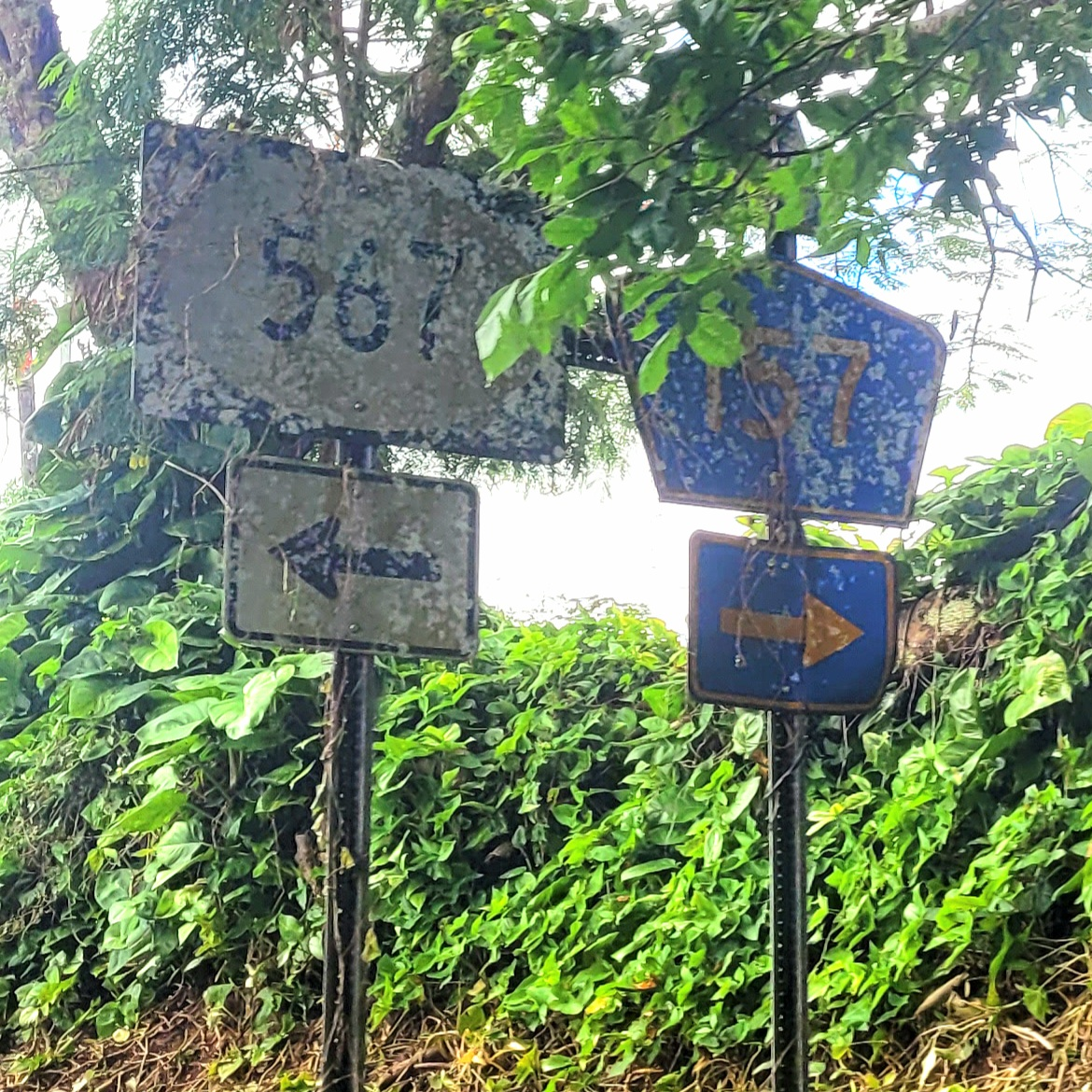
PR-157 east at PR-567 intersection between Damián Arriba and Barros barrios, Orocovis

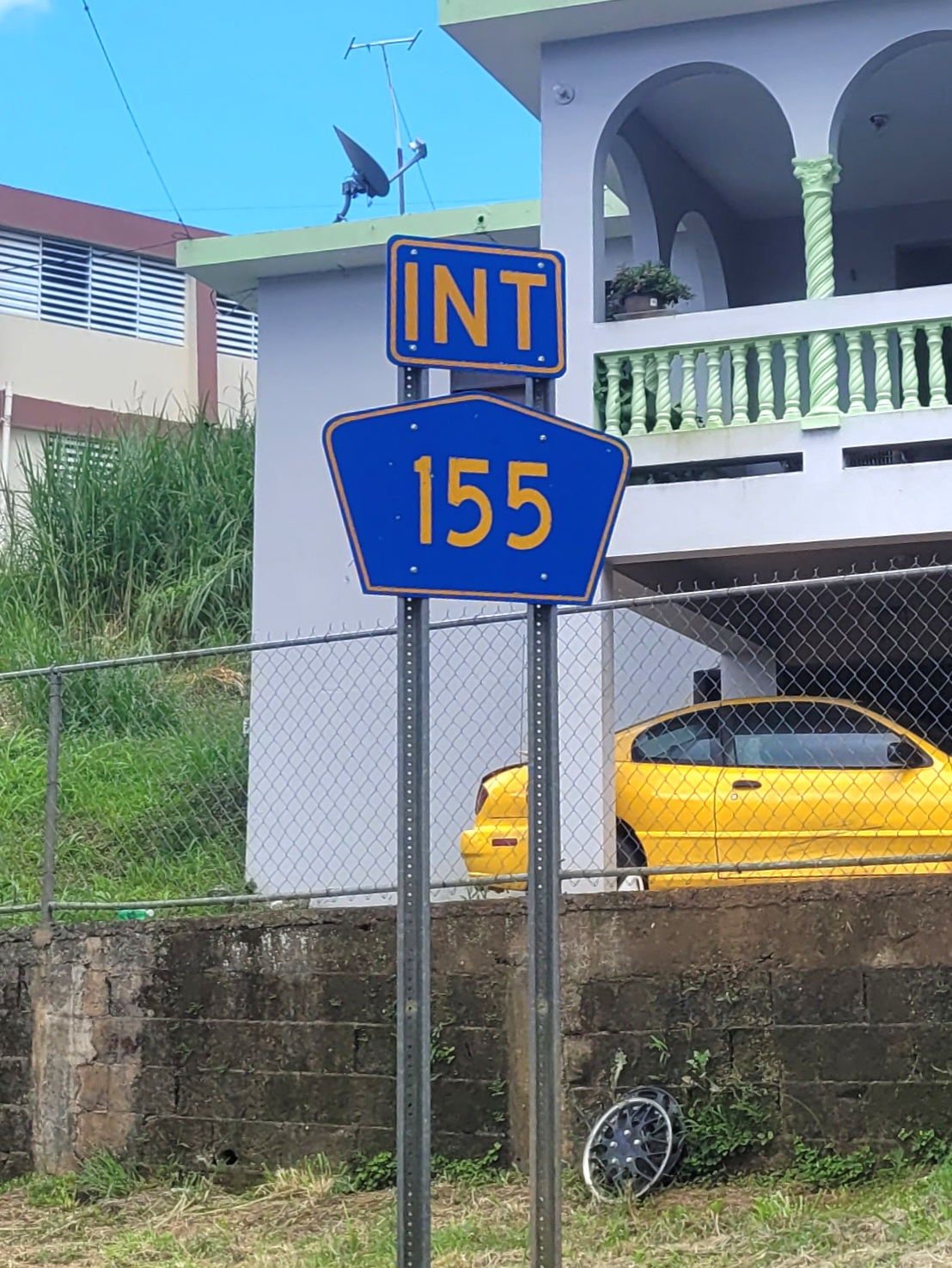
PR-157 east approaching PR-155 junction in Orocovis barrio

Municipality	Location	km	mi	Destinations	Notes
Ciales	Toro Negro	0.0	0.0	PR-149 (Carretera José Joaquín Rodríguez Rodríguez) – Ciales, Jayuya, Villalba	Western terminus of PR-157
Orocovis	Cacaos	7.6	4.7	PR-564 – Bauta Abajo	
Orocovis	Damián Abajo–Collores line	10.6	6.6	PR-6615 – Pozas	
Orocovis	Barros–Damián Arriba line	21.6	13.4	PR-567 – Morovis	
Orocovis	Barros	21.8	13.5	PR-566 – Pellejas	
Orocovis	Orocovis	24.3	15.1	PR-155 – Orocovis, Morovis	Eastern terminus of PR-157
1.000 mi = 1.609 km; 1.000 km = 0.621 mi

== See also ==
- 1953 Puerto Rico highway renumbering
