= Río Culebra =

Río Culebra may refer to:

- Río Culebra (Aguada, Puerto Rico)
- Río Culebra (Orocovis, Puerto Rico)
- Rio Culebra (Colorado), Costilla County, Colorado

== See also ==
- Culebra (disambiguation)
- Culebrinas River
