= Bauta River =

River of Puerto Rico

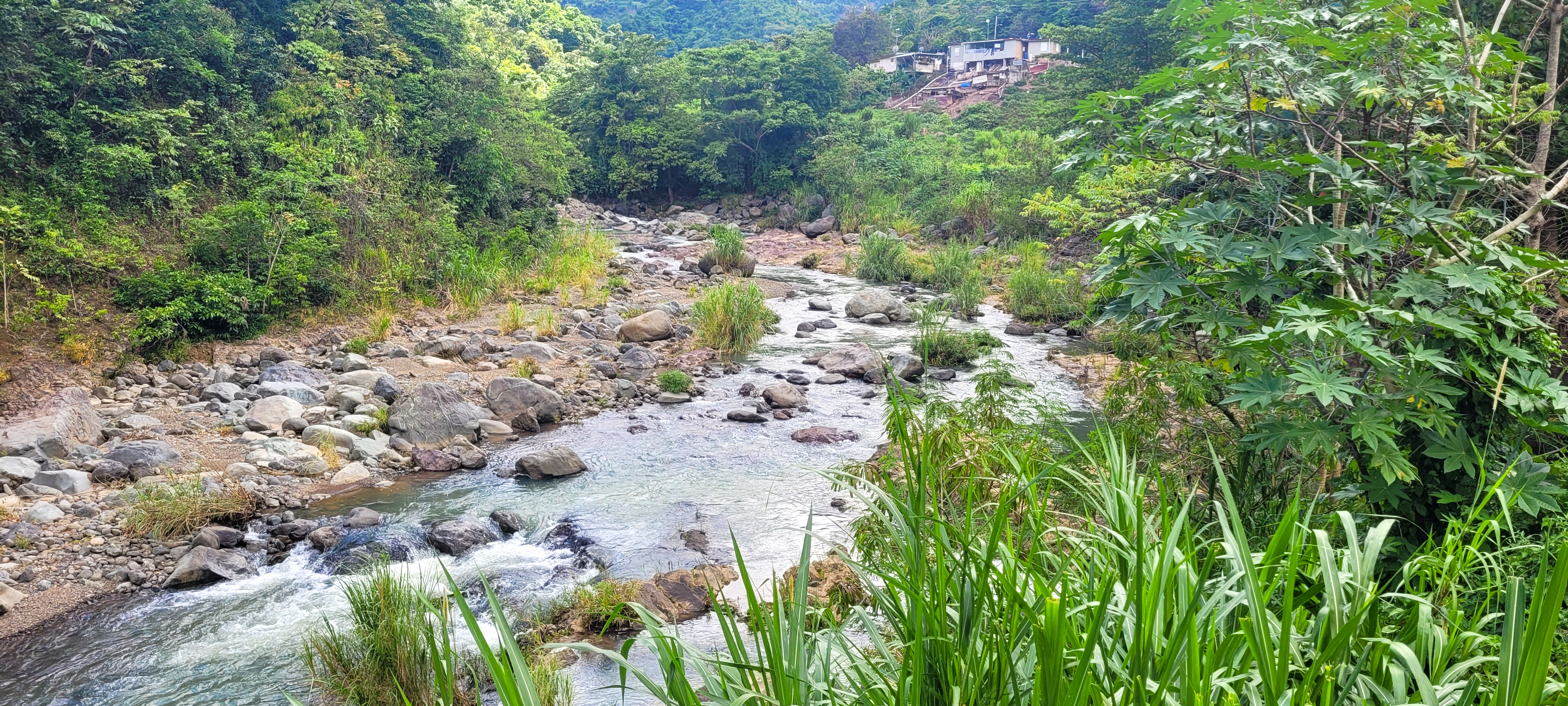
- Río Bauta between Damián Abajo and Pellejas barrios
- Native name: Río Bauta (Spanish)

Location
- Commonwealth: Puerto Rico
- Municipalities: Ciales, Morovis and Orocovis

Physical characteristics
- Source
  - location: Cordillera Central in Bauta Arriba, Orocovis
- Mouth
  - location: Manatí River in Jaguas, Ciales
  - coordinates: 18.3043969°N 66.4565599°W
  - elevation: 217 ft

Basin features
- Tributaries
  - left: Toro Negro
  - right: Culebra
- Waterfalls: Charco La Guitarra, Salto La Plazuela
- Bridges: PR-5567

The Bauta River (Spanish: Río Bauta) is a tributary of the Manatí River (Río Grande de Manatí), flowing through the municipalities of Orocovis, Ciales and Morovis in Puerto Rico. The river has its source in the barrio Bauta Arriba of Orocovis in the Cordillera Central, on the north face of the Atlantic-Caribbean orographic divide of Puerto Rico. It then flows northward into the Northern Karst belt of Puerto Rico, where it meets the Manatí River in the municipal boundary between Ciales and Morovis.

The Bauta River also has tributaries, most notably the Culebra and Toro Negro Rivers, and numerous streams and creeks. One of its most notable landmarks are La Plazuela Falls, which are formed by the Cacao Creek as it falls into the Bauta at a site of numerous plunge pools in an area known as Charco La Guitarra.

== See also ==
- Rivers in Puerto Rico
