= Culebra River =

Culebra River may refer to:

- Culebra River (Aguada, Puerto Rico)
- Culebra River (Orocovis, Puerto Rico)
