= Puerto Rico Highway 567 =

Highway in Puerto Rico

Highway 567
- Ruta 567

Route information
- Maintained by Puerto Rico DTPW
- Length: 16.3 km (10.1 mi)
- Existed: 1953–present

Major junctions
- South end: PR-157 in Barros–Damián Arriba
- PR-5567 in Pasto–Vaga
- North end: PR-145 / PR-6622 in Torrecillas–Morovis Norte

Location
- Country: United States
- Territory: Puerto Rico
- Municipalities: Orocovis, Morovis

Highway system
- Roads in Puerto Rico; List
← PR-549	→ PR-568
← PR-5538	PR-5567	→ PR-5568

Puerto Rico Highway 567 (PR-567) is a north–south rural road located between the municipalities of Orocovis and Morovis, Puerto Rico. It extends from its junction with PR-157 on the Barros–Damián Arriba line in Orocovis, passing through Vaga, Pasto and San Lorenzo barrios until its end at its intersection with PR-145 and PR-6622 in the Torrecillas–Morovis Norte line in Morovis.

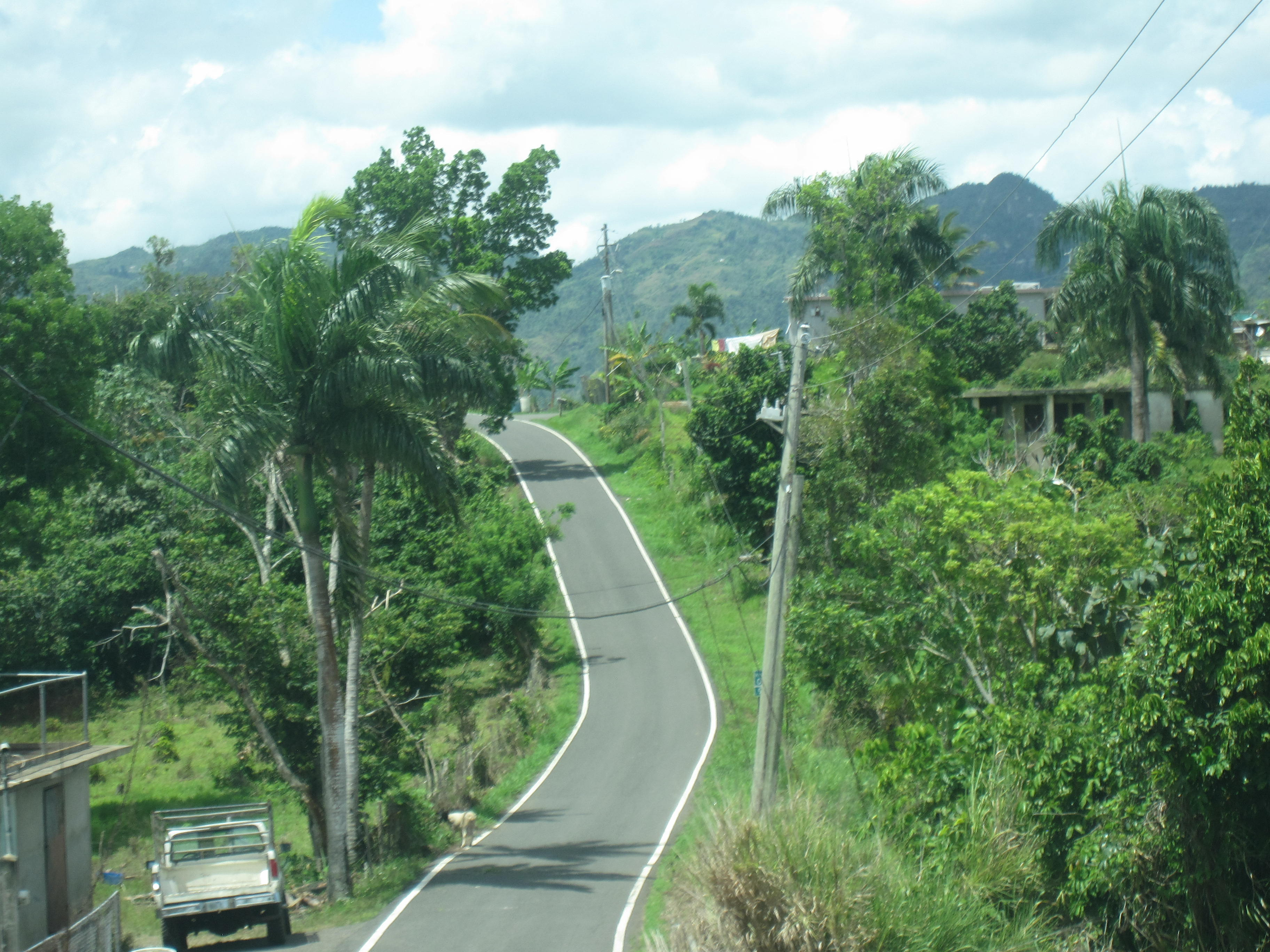
Puerto Rico Highway 567 in Vaga barrio

== Major intersections ==
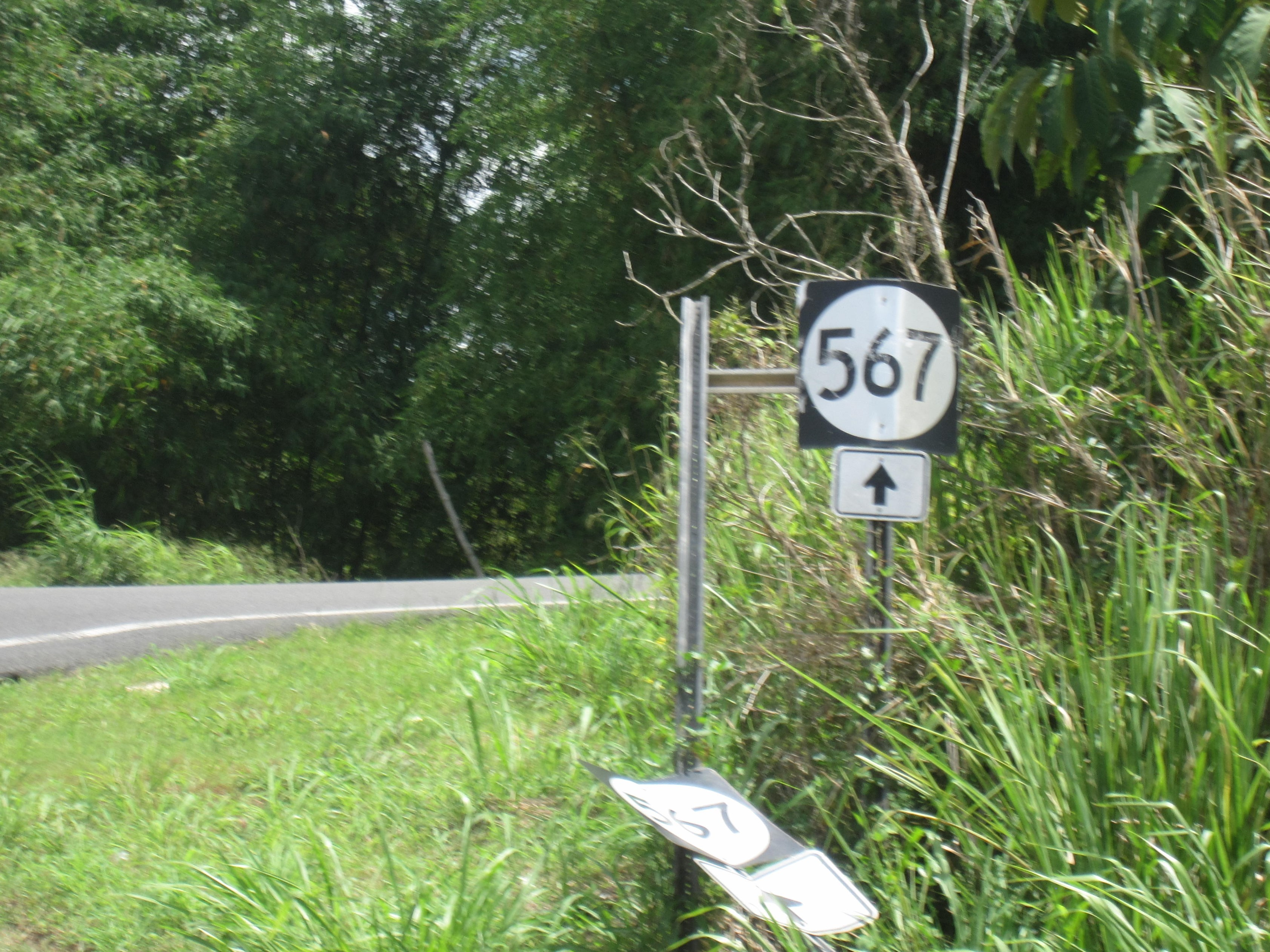
PR-567 at its junction with PR-5567 in Vaga barrio

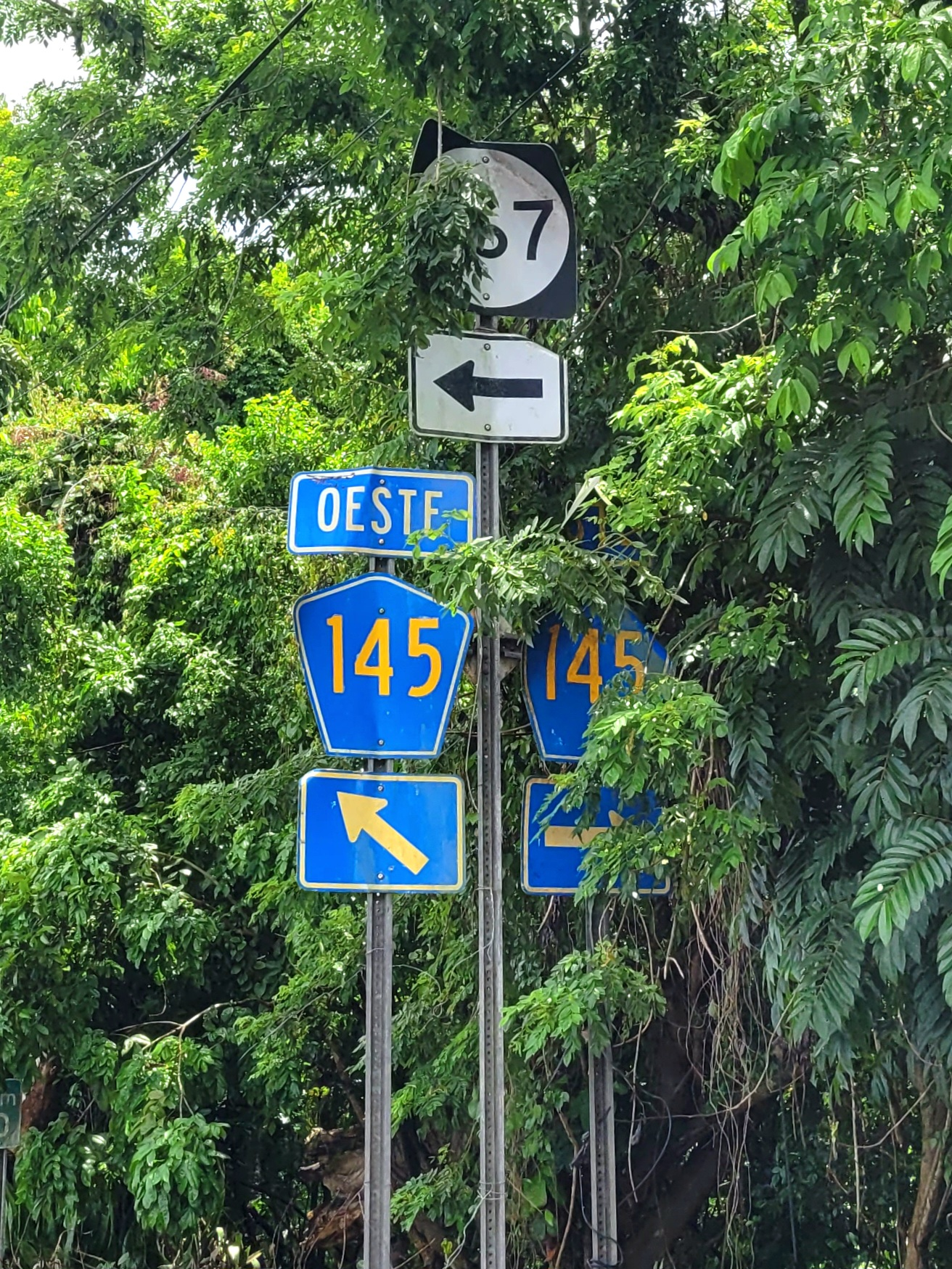
PR-6622 west at its junction with PR-145 and PR-567 south between Morovis Norte and Torrecillas barrios

Municipality	Location	km	mi	Destinations	Notes
Orocovis	Barros–Damián Arriba line	0.0	0.0	PR-157 – Orocovis, Ciales, Jayuya	Southern terminus of PR-567
Morovis	Pasto–Vaga line	4.6	2.9	PR-5567 – Vaga	
Morovis	Torrecillas–Morovis Norte line	16.3	10.1	PR-145 / PR-6622 (Carretera Licenciado Héctor "Chiqui" Russe Martínez) – Morovis, Ciales	Northern terminus of PR-567
1.000 mi = 1.609 km; 1.000 km = 0.621 mi

== Related route ==
Highway 5567
- Location: Morovis
- Length: 2.8 km (1.7 mi)

Puerto Rico Highway 5567 (PR-5567) is a spur route located in Morovis. It extends from PR-567 on the Pasto–Vaga line to Vaga barrio. The entire route is located in Morovis.

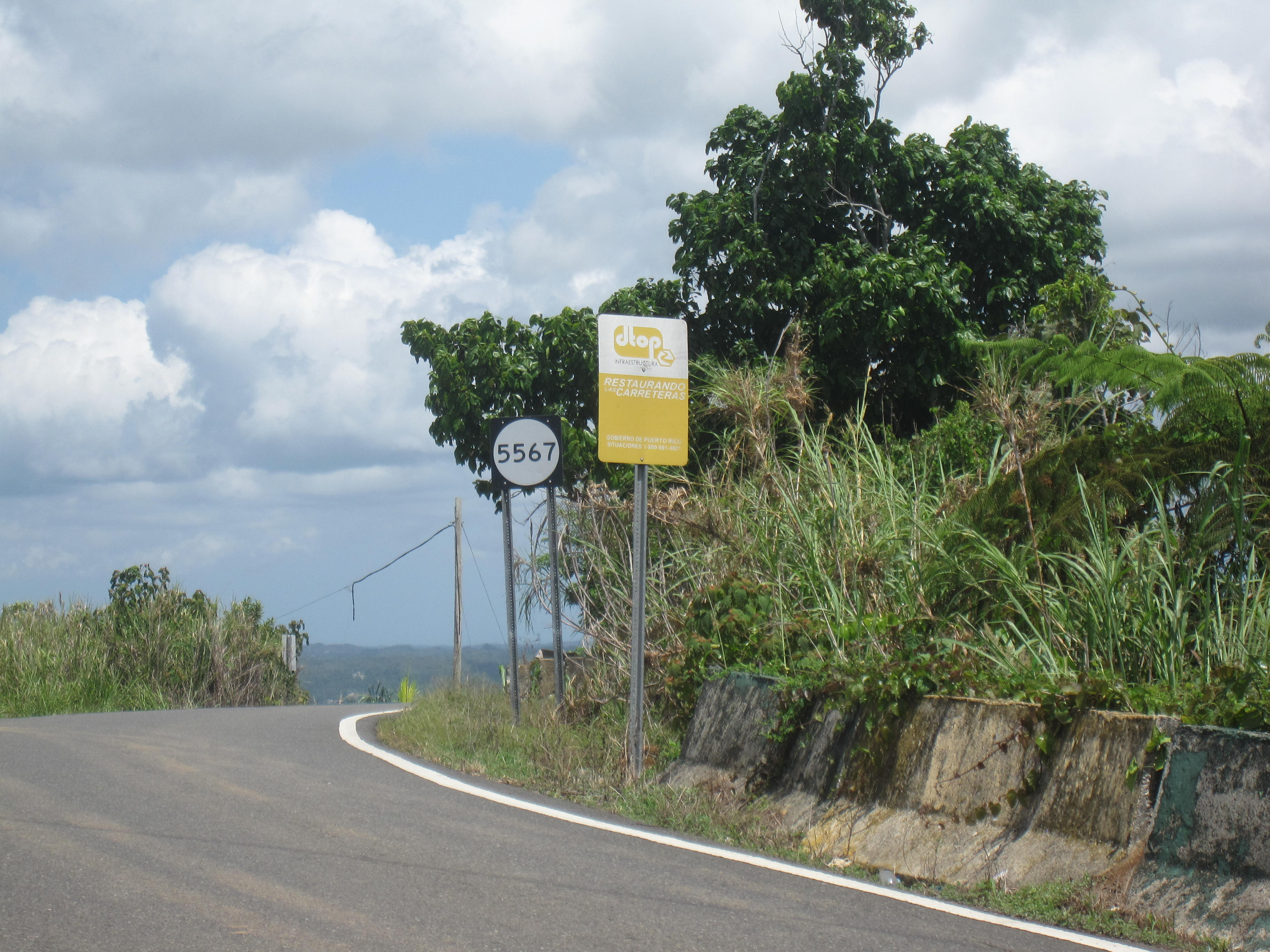
PR-5567 heading north to Vaga barrio

Location	km	mi	Destinations	Notes
Pasto–Vaga line	0.0	0.0	PR-567 – Morovis, Orocovis	Southern terminus of PR-5567
Vaga	2.8	1.7	Northern terminus of PR-5567	
1.000 mi = 1.609 km; 1.000 km = 0.621 mi

== See also ==
- 1953 Puerto Rico highway renumbering
