= Collores, Orocovis, Puerto Rico =

Barrio of Puerto Rico

Collores
- Barrio
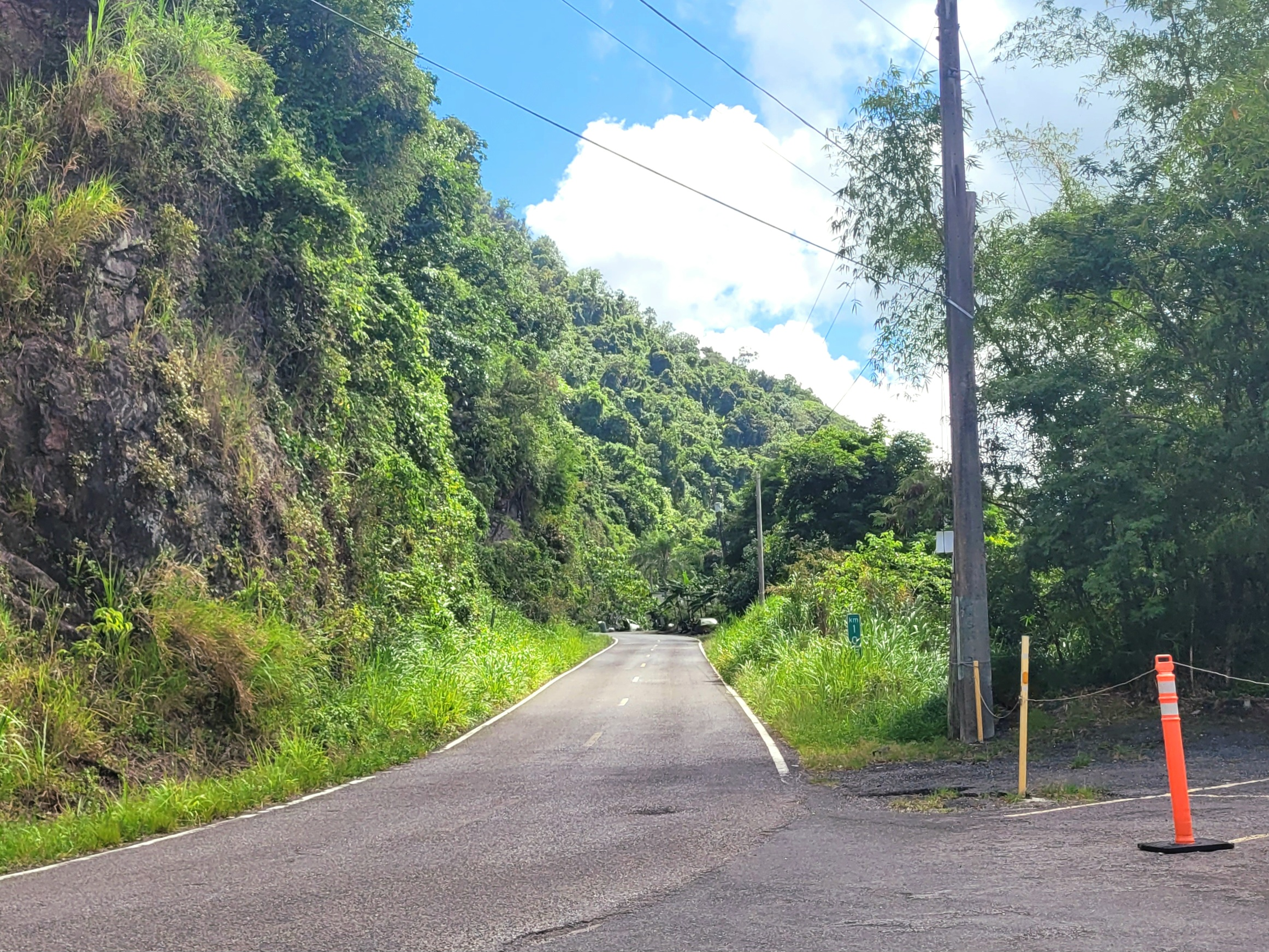
- Puerto Rico Highway 157 between Collores and Damián Abajo barrios

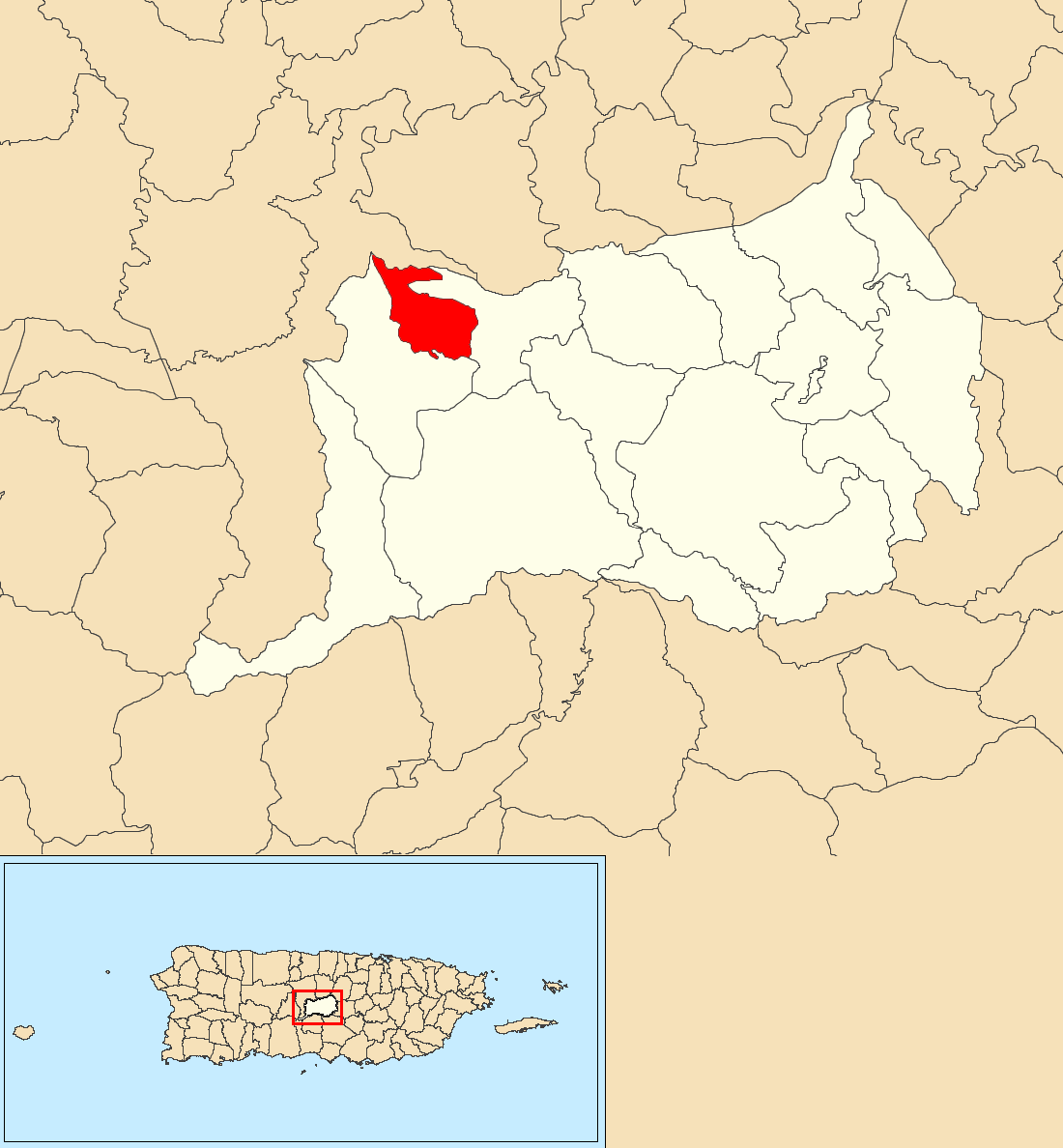
- Location of Collores within the municipality of Orocovis shown in red

- Location of Puerto Rico
- Coordinates: 18°14′29″N 66°29′14″W
- Commonwealth: Puerto Rico
- Municipality: Orocovis

Area
  - Total: 1.49 sq mi (3.9 km^{2})
  - Land: 1.49 sq mi (3.9 km^{2})
  - Water: 0 sq mi (0 km^{2})
- Elevation: 1,247 ft (380 m)

Population (2010)
  - Total: 152
  - Density: 102/sq mi (39/km^{2})
- Source: 2010 Census
- Time zone: UTC−4 (AST)
- ZIP Code: 00720
- Area code: 787/939

Collores is a barrio in the municipality of Orocovis, Puerto Rico. Its population in 2010 was 152.

== Sectors ==
Barrios (which are, in contemporary times, roughly comparable to minor civil divisions) in turn are further subdivided into smaller local populated place areas/units called sectores (sectors in English). The types of sectores may vary, from normally sector to urbanización to reparto to barriada to residencial, among others.

There are no sectors in Collores barrio:

== History ==
Collores was in Spain's gazetteers until Puerto Rico was ceded by Spain in the aftermath of the Spanish–American War under the terms of the Treaty of Paris of 1898 and became an unincorporated territory of the United States. In 1899, the United States Department of War conducted a census of Puerto Rico finding that the combined population of Collores and Cacaos barrios was 1,588.

Historical population
Census	Pop.	Note	%±
1910	462		—
1920	475		2.8%
1930	269		−43.4%
1940	298		10.8%
1950	259		−13.1%
1960	173		−33.2%
1970	110		−36.4%
1980	58		−47.3%
1990	91		56.9%
2000	137		50.5%
2010	152		10.9%
U.S. Decennial Census; 1900 (N/A) 1910-1930; 1930-1950 1980-2000 2010

== See also ==
- List of communities in Puerto Rico
