= Culebra =

Culebra (meaning snake in Spanish) may refer to:

- Culebra, Puerto Rico, an island
- Culebra Cut, an artificial valley in the Panama Canal
- Culebra Peak, in Colorado, United States
- Culebra River (disambiguation)
- Sierra de la Culebra, a mountain range in Castile and León, Spain
- Isla Culebra, the Spanish name of Sedge Island, part of the Falkland archipelago
