= Pellejas, Orocovis, Puerto Rico =

Barrio of Puerto Rico

Pellejas
- Barrio
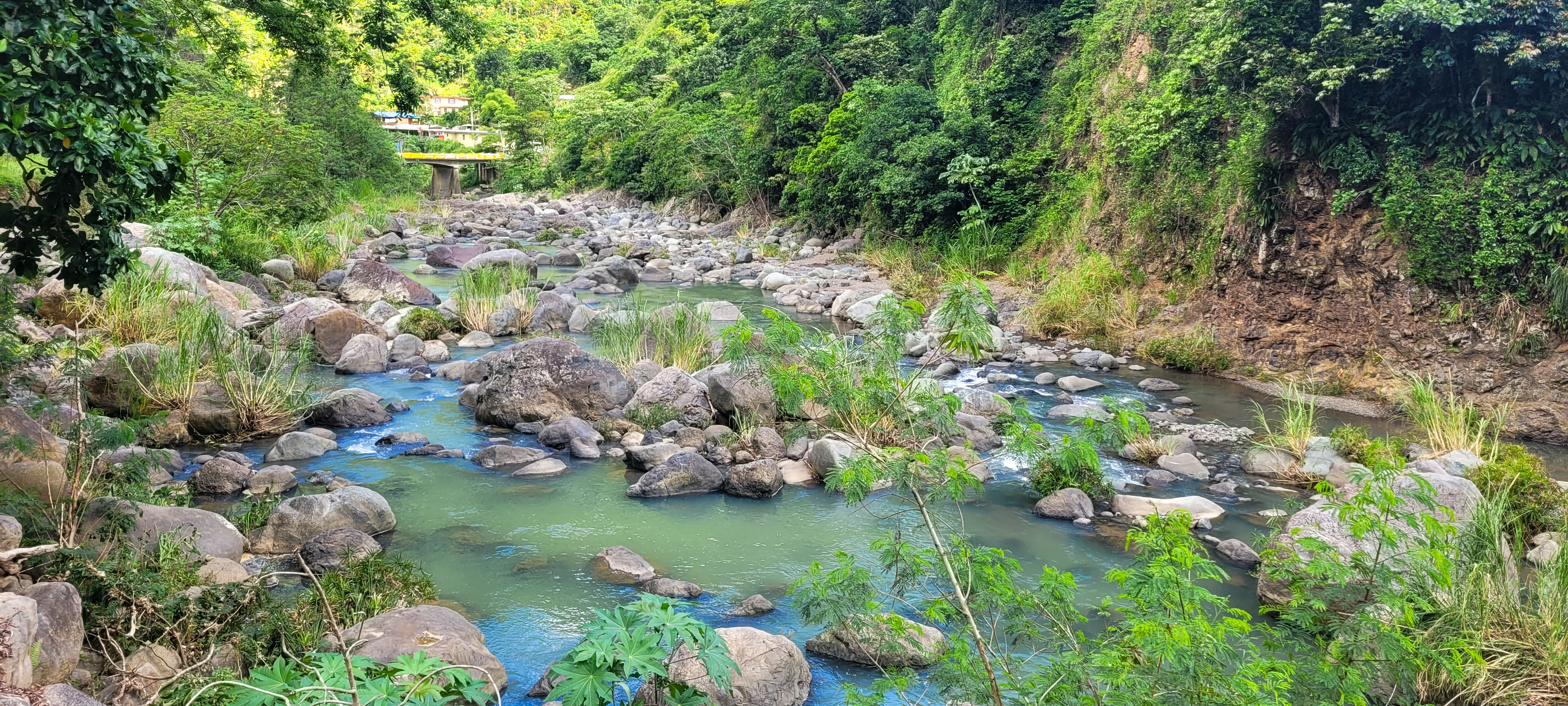
- Bauta River between Pellejas and Damián Abajo barrios

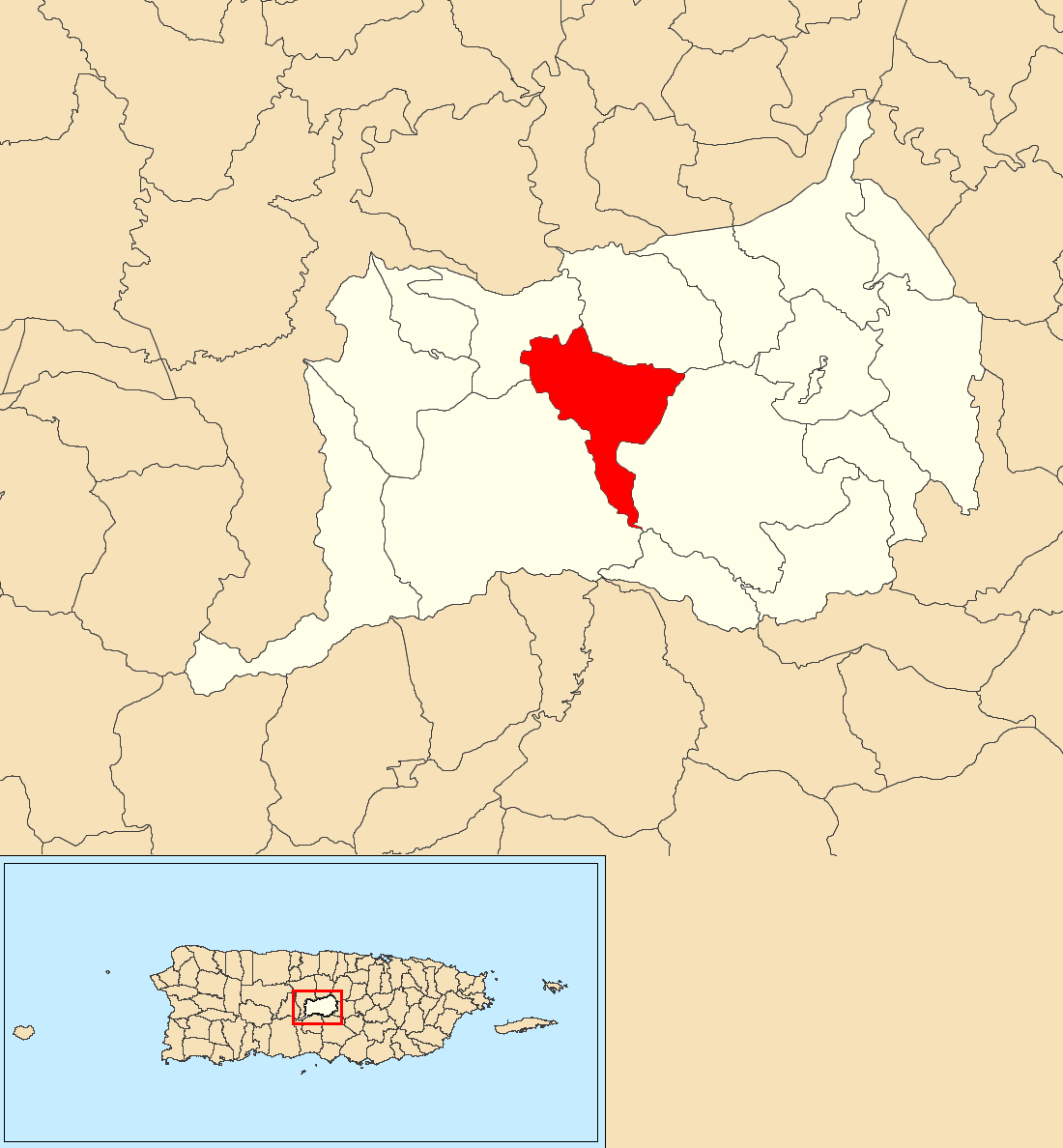
- Location of Pellejas within the municipality of Orocovis shown in red

- Location of Puerto Rico
- Coordinates: 18°13′09″N 66°26′39″W
- Commonwealth: Puerto Rico
- Municipality: Orocovis

Area
  - Total: 3.53 sq mi (9.1 km^{2})
  - Land: 3.53 sq mi (9.1 km^{2})
  - Water: 0 sq mi (0 km^{2})
- Elevation: 2,579 ft (786 m)

Population (2010)
  - Total: 577
  - Density: 163.5/sq mi (63.1/km^{2})
- Source: 2010 Census
- Time zone: UTC−4 (AST)
- ZIP Code: 00720
- Area code: 787/939

Pellejas is a barrio in the municipality of Orocovis, Puerto Rico. Its population in 2010 was 577.

== Sectors ==
Barrios (which are, in contemporary times, roughly comparable to minor civil divisions) in turn are further subdivided into smaller local populated place areas/units called sectores (sectors in English). The types of sectores may vary, from normally sector to urbanización to reparto to barriada to residencial, among others.

There are no sectors in Pellejas barrio.:

== History ==
Pellejas was in Spain's gazetteers until Puerto Rico was ceded by Spain in the aftermath of the Spanish–American War under the terms of the Treaty of Paris of 1898 and became an unincorporated territory of the United States. In 1899, the United States Department of War conducted a census of Puerto Rico finding that the combined population of Bauta Arriba and Pellejas barrios was 1,331.

Historical population
Census	Pop.	Note	%±
1910	705		—
1920	681		−3.4%
1930	587		−13.8%
1940	809		37.8%
1950	854		5.6%
1960	1,061		24.2%
1970	799		−24.7%
1980	651		−18.5%
1990	692		6.3%
2000	436		−37.0%
2010	577		32.3%
U.S. Decennial Census; 1900 (N/A) 1910-1930; 1930-1950 1980-2000 2010

== See also ==
- List of communities in Puerto Rico
