= Culebra River (Aguada, Puerto Rico) =

River in Aguada, Puerto Rico

Coordinates: 18.3816131°N 67.2082365°W

- Native name: Río Culebra (Spanish)

Location
- Commonwealth: Puerto Rico
- Municipality: Aguada

The Culebra River is a river of Aguada, Puerto Rico.

== See also ==
- List of rivers of Puerto Rico
