= Barros, Orocovis, Puerto Rico =

Barrio of Puerto Rico

Barros
- Barrio
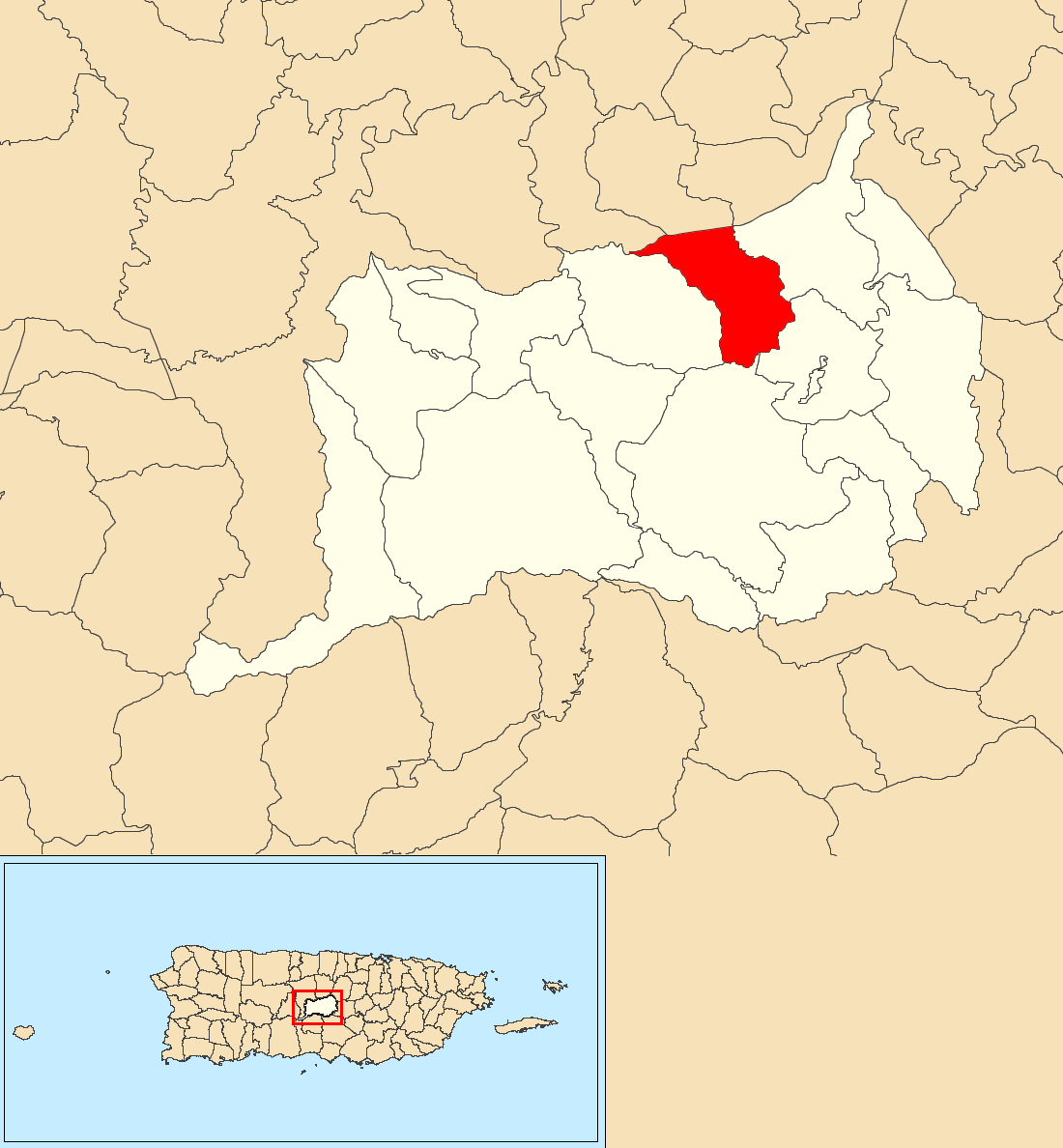
- Location of Barros within the municipality of Orocovis shown in red

- Location of Puerto Rico
- Coordinates: 18°14′51″N 66°24′46″W
- Commonwealth: Puerto Rico
- Municipality: Orocovis

Area
  - Total: 2.74 sq mi (7.1 km^{2})
  - Land: 2.74 sq mi (7.1 km^{2})
  - Water: 0 sq mi (0 km^{2})
- Elevation: 1,906 ft (581 m)

Population (2010)
  - Total: 1,917
  - Density: 699.6/sq mi (270.1/km^{2})
- Source: 2010 Census
- Time zone: UTC−4 (AST)
- ZIP Code: 00720
- Area code: 787/939

Barros is a barrio in the municipality of Orocovis, Puerto Rico. Its population in 2010 was 1,917.

== Sectors ==
Barrios (which are, in contemporary times, roughly comparable to minor civil divisions) in turn are further subdivided into smaller local populated place areas/units called sectores (sectors in English). The types of sectores may vary, from normally sector to urbanización to reparto to barriada to residencial, among others.

The following sectors are in Barros barrio:

Sector Camilo Meléndez, Sector Doña Lala, Sector Enrique Pérez, Sector La Familia, Sector La Loma, Sector La Vaquería, Sector Las Estancias, Sector Limones, Sector Los Hernández, Sector Los Rivera, Sector Monte Bello, and Sector Sanamuertos.

== History ==
Barros was in Spain's gazetteers until Puerto Rico was ceded by Spain in the aftermath of the Spanish–American War under the terms of the Treaty of Paris of 1898 and became an unincorporated territory of the United States. In 1899, the United States Department of War conducted a census of Puerto Rico finding that the population of Barros barrio was 987.

Historical population
Census	Pop.	Note	%±
1900	987		—
1910	845		−14.4%
1920	650		−23.1%
1930	757		16.5%
1940	847		11.9%
1950	1,374		62.2%
1960	1,043		−24.1%
1970	1,325		27.0%
1980	1,591		20.1%
1990	1,753		10.2%
2000	1,862		6.2%
2010	1,917		3.0%
U.S. Decennial Census; 1899 (shown as 1900) 1910-1930; 1930-1950 1980-2000 2010

== See also ==
- List of communities in Puerto Rico
