= Culebra River (Orocovis, Puerto Rico) =

River of Puerto Rico

Coordinates: 18.2577323°N 66.4551712°W

- Native name: Río Culebra (Spanish)

Location
- Commonwealth: Puerto Rico
- Municipality: Orocovis

The Culebra River is a river of Orocovis, Puerto Rico.

== See also ==
- List of rivers of Puerto Rico
