= Damián Abajo =

Barrio in Orocovis, Puerto Rico

- Barrio
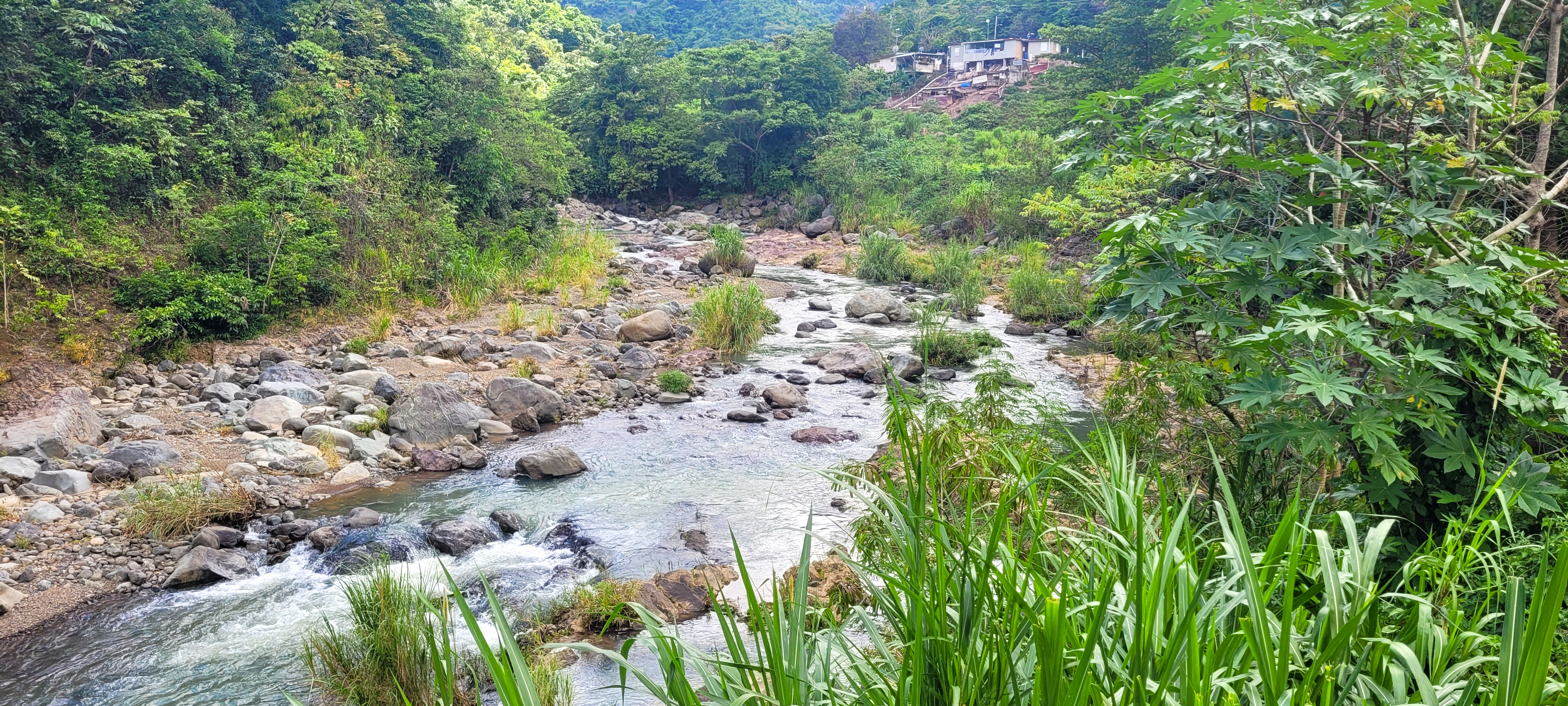
- Bauta River between Damián Abajo and Pellejas barrios

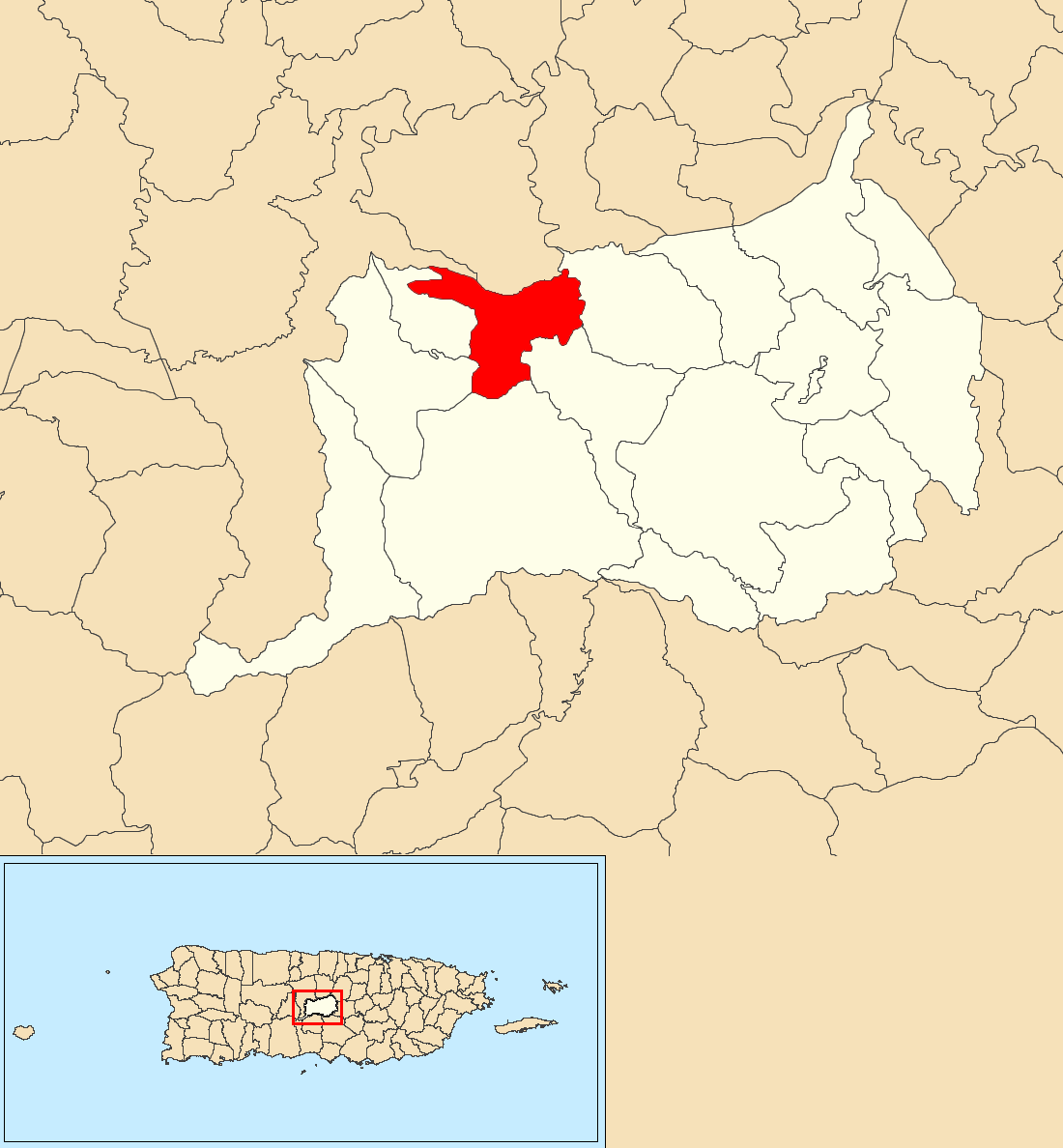
- Location of Damián Abajo within the municipality of Orocovis shown in red

- Location of Puerto Rico
- Coordinates: 18°14′21″N 66°28′02″W
- Commonwealth: Puerto Rico
- Municipality: Orocovis

Area
  - Total: 2.7 sq mi (7.0 km^{2})
  - Land: 2.7 sq mi (7.0 km^{2})
  - Water: 0 sq mi (0 km^{2})
- Elevation: 1,217 ft (371 m)

Population (2010)
  - Total: 754
  - Density: 279.3/sq mi (107.8/km^{2})
- Source: 2010 Census
- Time zone: UTC−4 (AST)
- ZIP Code: 00720
- Area code: 787/939

Damián Abajo is a barrio in the municipality of Orocovis, Puerto Rico. Its population in 2010 was 754.

== Sectors ==
Barrios (which are, in contemporary times, roughly comparable to minor civil divisions) in turn are further subdivided into smaller local populated place areas/units called sectores (sectors in English). The types of sectores may vary, from normally sector to urbanización to reparto to barriada to residencial, among others.

The following sectors are in Damián Abajo barrio:

Sector Área Recreativa, Sector Camilo Meléndez, Sector Canta Sapo, Sector Culebras, Sector El Granillín, Sector El Puente, Sector El Verde, Sector Gregorio, Sector La Escuela, Sector La Frontera, Sector La Hacienda, Sector La Luna, Sector Las Palmas, Sector Los Muros, Sector Meseta, Sector Palma Gorda, Sector Pedro Morales, Sector Román Díaz, Sector Taita, and Sector Vitín Medina.

== History ==
Damián Abajo was in Spain's gazetteers until Puerto Rico was ceded by Spain in the aftermath of the Spanish–American War under the terms of the Treaty of Paris of 1898 and became an unincorporated territory of the United States. In 1899, the United States Department of War conducted a census of Puerto Rico finding that the population of Damián Abajo barrio was 922.

Historical population
Census	Pop.	Note	%±
1900	922		—
1910	798		−13.4%
1920	931		16.7%
1930	900		−3.3%
1940	877		−2.6%
1950	815		−7.1%
1960	778		−4.5%
1970	622		−20.1%
1980	558		−10.3%
1990	613		9.9%
2000	746		21.7%
2010	754		1.1%
U.S. Decennial Census; 1899 (shown as 1900) 1910-1930; 1930-1950 1980-2000 2010

== See also ==
- List of communities in Puerto Rico
