= Damián Arriba =

Barrio of Orocovis, Puerto Rico

- Barrio
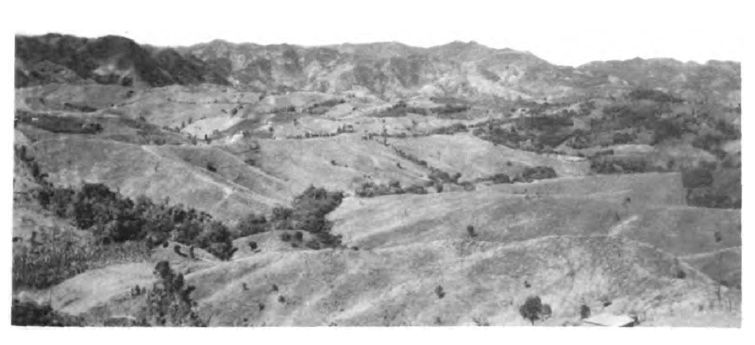
- Damián Arriba in 1949

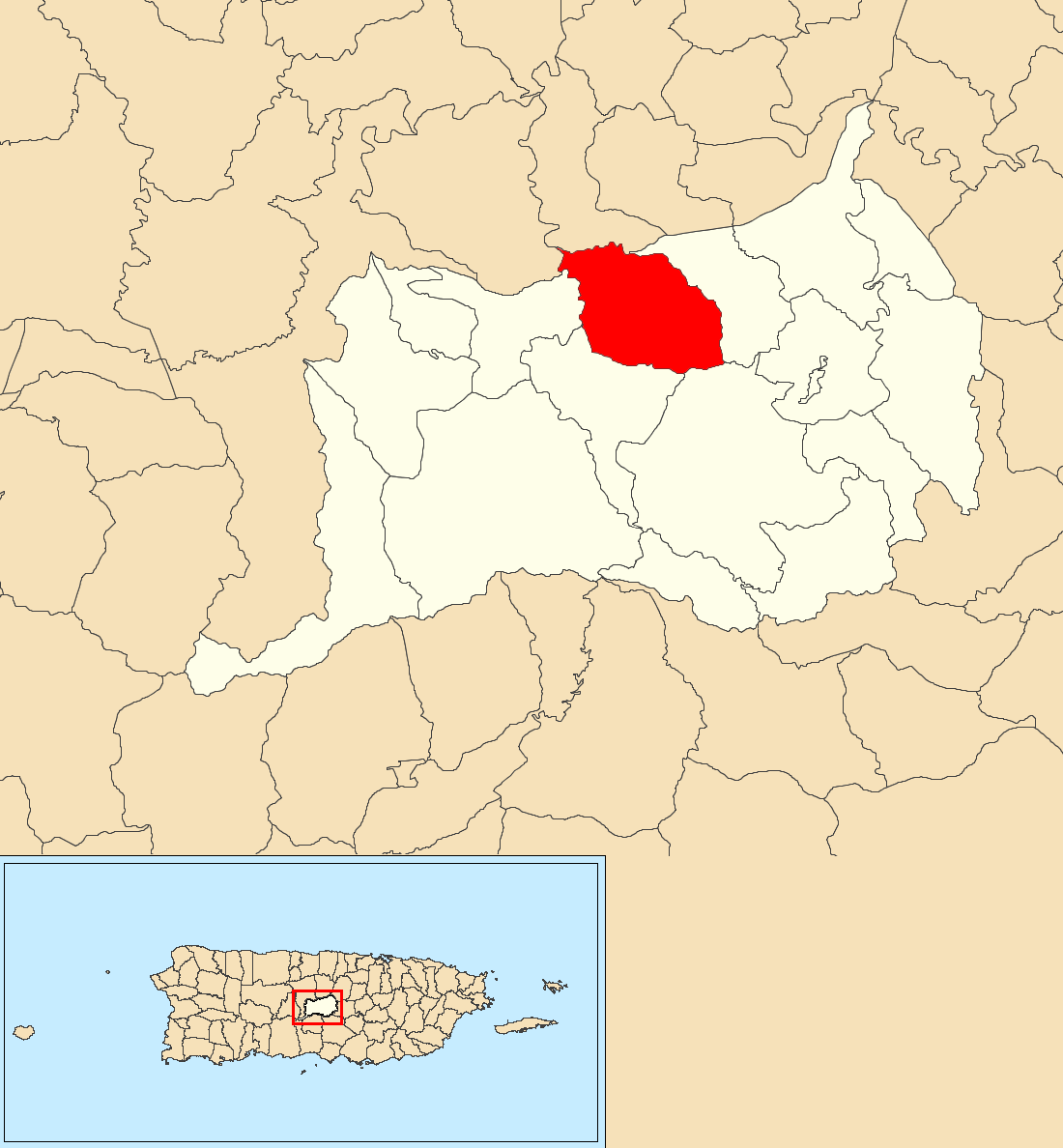
- Location of Damián Arriba within the municipality of Orocovis shown in red

- Location of Puerto Rico
- Coordinates: 18°14′32″N 66°26′02″W
- Commonwealth: Puerto Rico
- Municipality: Orocovis

Area
  - Total: 3.87 sq mi (10.0 km^{2})
  - Land: 3.87 sq mi (10.0 km^{2})
  - Water: 0 sq mi (0 km^{2})
- Elevation: 1,647 ft (502 m)

Population (2010)
  - Total: 913
  - Density: 235.9/sq mi (91.1/km^{2})
- Source: 2010 Census
- Time zone: UTC−4 (AST)
- ZIP Code: 00720
- Area code: 787/939

Damián Arriba is a barrio in the municipality of Orocovis, Puerto Rico. Its population in 2010 was 913.

== Sectors ==
Barrios (which are, in contemporary times, roughly comparable to minor civil divisions) in turn are further subdivided into smaller local populated place areas/units called sectores (sectors in English). The types of sectores may vary, from normally sector to urbanización to reparto to barriada to residencial, among others.

There are no sectors in Damián Arriba barrio.

== History ==
Damián Arriba was in Spain's gazetteers until Puerto Rico was ceded by Spain in the aftermath of the Spanish–American War under the terms of the Treaty of Paris of 1898 and became an unincorporated territory of the United States. In 1899, the United States Department of War conducted a census of Puerto Rico finding that the population of Damián Arriba barrio was 839.

Historical population
Census	Pop.	Note	%±
1900	839		—
1910	901		7.4%
1920	986		9.4%
1930	902		−8.5%
1940	1,383		53.3%
1950	1,267		−8.4%
1960	1,004		−20.8%
1970	1,048		4.4%
1980	826		−21.2%
1990	780		−5.6%
2000	893		14.5%
2010	913		2.2%
U.S. Decennial Census; 1899 (shown as 1900) 1910-1930; 1930-1950 1980-2000 2010

== Damián Arriba fault line ==
The Damián Arriba fault line traverses Damián Arriba barrio from east to west close to route PR-155. It has been studied by geologists over the years.

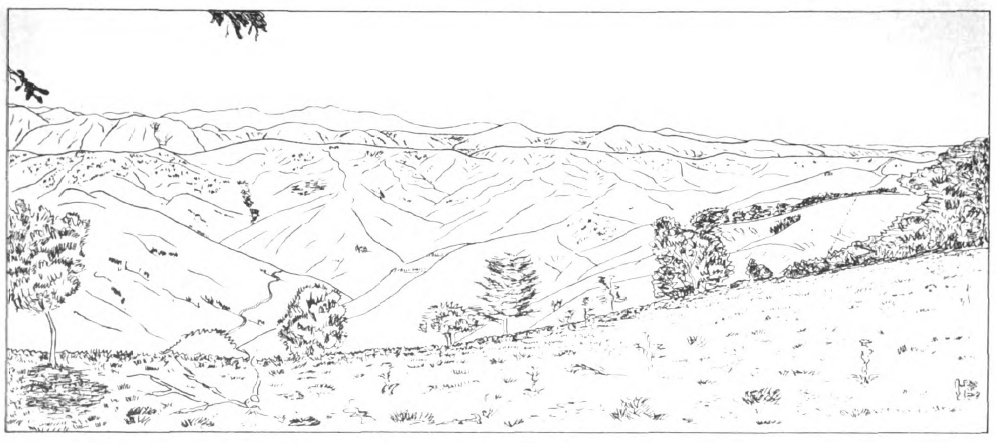
Sketch of the Damián Arriba fault (and the Cordillera Central behind it).

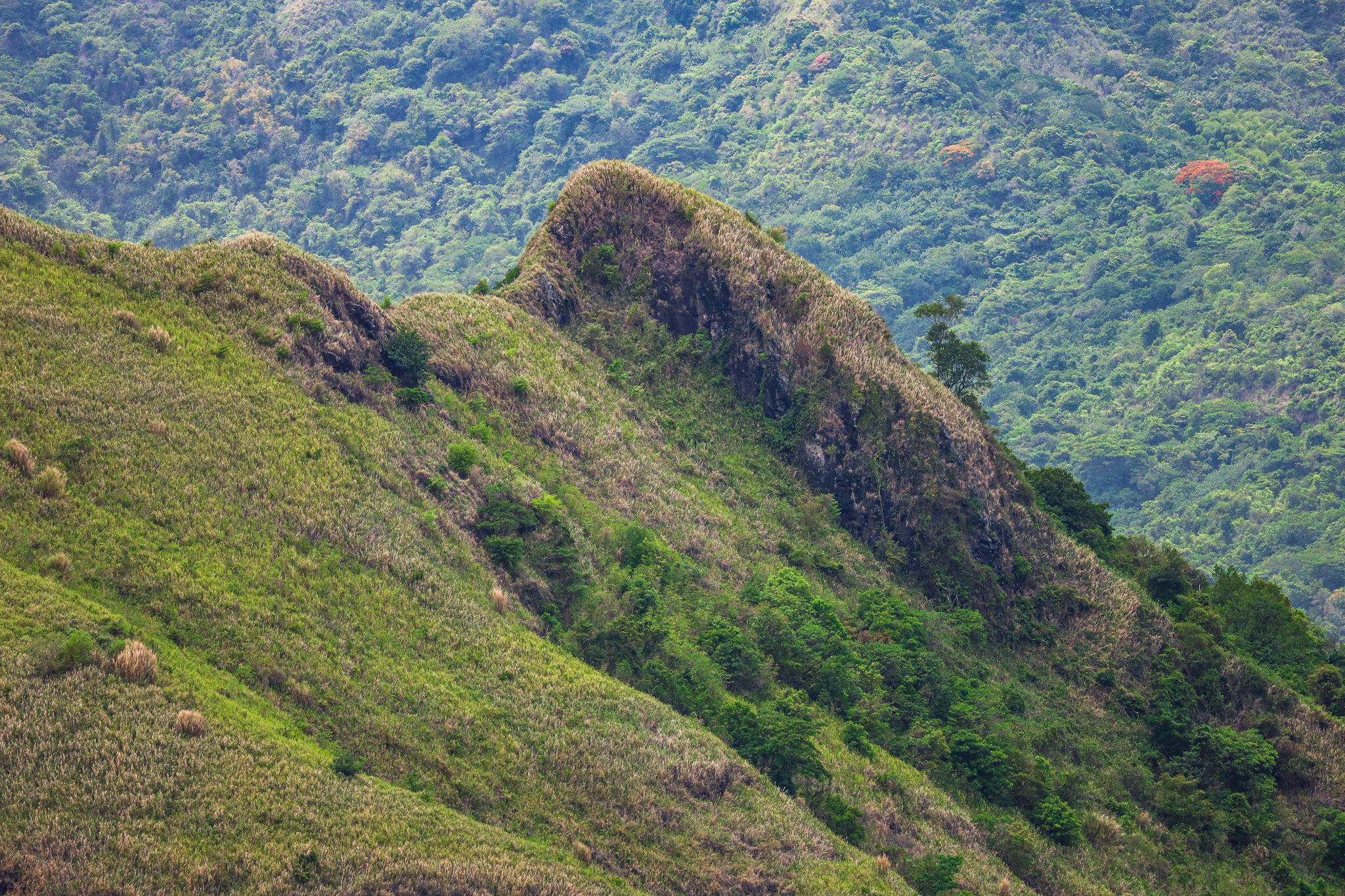
Tectonic uplift in Cerro Mime in Damián Arriba.

== See also ==
- List of communities in Puerto Rico
