= Municipalities of Puerto Rico =

Municipalities of Puerto Rico municipios de Puerto Rico (Spanish)
- Map of Puerto Rico by municipality
- Location: Commonwealth of Puerto Rico
- Number: 78
- Populations: From 1,818 pop. in Culebra to 395,326 pop. in San Juan
- Areas: From 4.84 square miles (12.5 km^{2}) in Cataño to 125.95 square miles (326.2 km^{2}) in Arecibo
- Government: Mayor–council government
- Subdivisions: Barrio

The municipalities of Puerto Rico (Spanish: municipios de Puerto Rico) are second-level administrative divisions defined with geographic boundaries and governmental authority in the archipelago and island of Puerto Rico, an unincorporated territory of the U.S. Amounting to 78 incorporated towns and cities equivalent to U.S. counties, two of which are outside the main island, namely the smaller islands of Vieques and Culebra, the municipalities are governed by a popularly elected strong mayor and unicameral legislature. They are subdivided into 902 barrios, third-level divisions controlled by the municipal government. As a jurisdiction under U.S. sovereignty, Puerto Rico does not have first-level administrative units akin to states or provinces.

The municipalities of Puerto Rico operate under the Municipal Code of Puerto Rico (Law No. 107 of 2020), which superseded the Autonomous Municipalities Act of Puerto Rico (Law No. 81 of 1991), as established by the Legislative Assembly of Puerto Rico, the governmental body responsible for their organization under Section 1, Article VI of the Constitution of Puerto Rico. Electorally, the municipalities are grouped into eight senatorial districts and forty representative districts, representing roughly equal populations in the Legislative Assembly.

== Map ==
The archipelago and island of Puerto Rico is administratively divided into the following 78 municipalities:

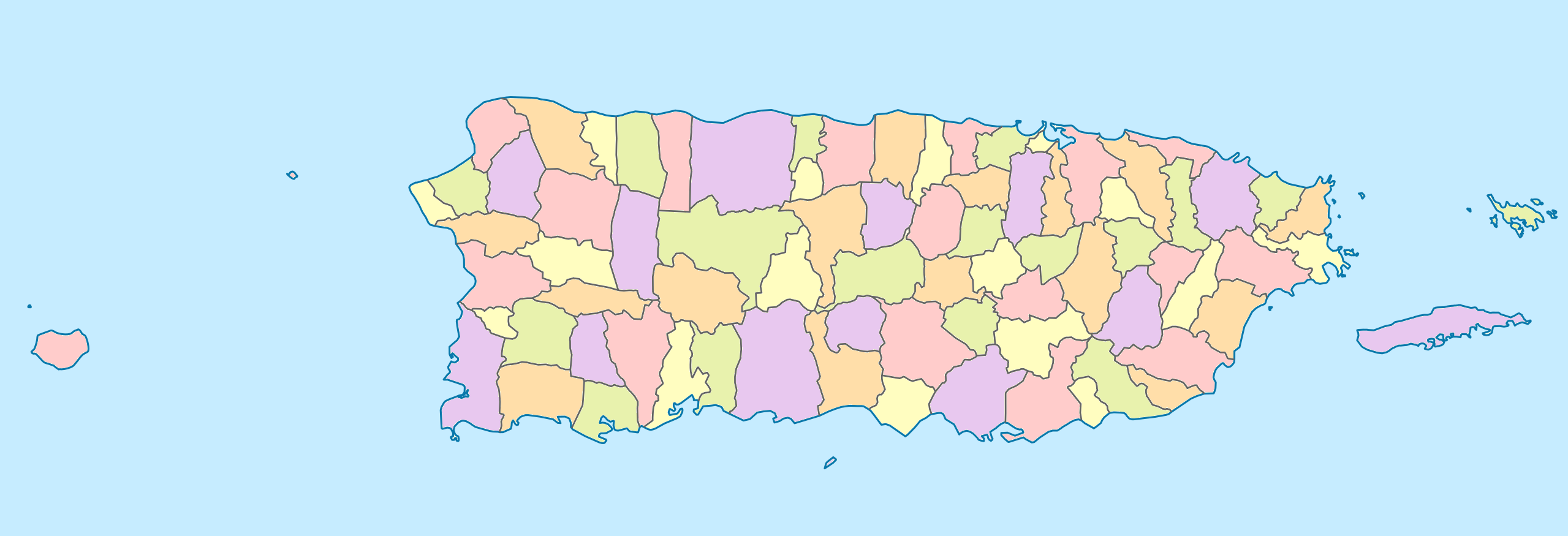

== List ==
The archipelago and island of Puerto Rico is administratively divided into the following 78 municipalities (alphabetically ordered):

Municipalities of Puerto Rico
Name	Location	Flag	Coat of Arms	Title	FIPS code	Population (2020)	Area	Founded	Barrios
Adjuntas				Town	72001	18,020	66.69 sq mi (172.73 sq km)	1815	List
Aguada				Town	72003	38,136	30.85 sq mi (79.90 sq km)	1639	List
Aguadilla				City	72005	55,101	36.53 sq mi (94.61 sq km)	1775	List
Aguas Buenas				Town	72007	24,223	30.08 sq mi (77.92 sq km)	1838	List
Aibonito				Town	72009	24,637	31.31 sq mi (81.10 sq km)	1824	List
Añasco				Town	72011	25,596	39.29 sq mi (101.75 sq km)	1733	List
Arecibo				City	72013	87,754	125.95 sq mi (326.20 sq km)	1616	List
Arroyo				Town	72015	15,843	15.01 sq mi (38.87 sq km)	1855	List
Barceloneta				Town	72017	22,657	18.69 sq mi (48.41 sq km)	1881	List
Barranquitas				Town	72019	28,983	34.25 sq mi (88.71 sq km)	1803	List
Bayamón				City	72021	185,187	44.32 sq mi (114.80 sq km)	1772	List
Cabo Rojo				Town	72023	47,158	70.37 sq mi (182.27 sq km)	1771	List
Caguas				City	72025	127,244	58.60 sq mi (151.77 sq km)	1775	List
Camuy				Town	72027	32,827	46.35 sq mi (120.06 sq km)	1807	List
Canóvanas				Town	72029	42,337	32.87 sq mi (85.12 sq km)	1909	List
Carolina				City	72031	154,815	45.32 sq mi (117.38 sq km)	1816	List
Cataño				Town	72033	23,155	4.84 sq mi (12.55 sq km)	1927	List
Cayey				Town	72035	41,652	51.93 sq mi (134.51 sq km)	1773	List
Ceiba				Town	72037	11,307	29.04 sq mi (75.20 sq km)	1838	List
Ciales				Town	72039	16,984	66.53 sq mi (172.31 sq km)	1820	List
Cidra				Town	72041	39,970	36.02 sq mi (93.29 sq km)	1809	List
Coamo				Town	72043	34,668	78.10 sq mi (202.27 sq km)	1579	List
Comerío				Town	72045	18,883	28.40 sq mi (73.56 sq km)	1826	List
Corozal				Town	72047	34,571	42.57 sq mi (110.26 sq km)	1795	List
Culebra				Town	72049	1,792	11.62 sq mi (30.10 sq km)	1880	List
Dorado				Town	72051	35,879	23.09 sq mi (59.80 sq km)	1842	List
Fajardo				Town	72053	32,124	29.86 sq mi (77.34 sq km)	1772	List
Florida				Town	72054	11,692	15.21 sq mi (39.39 sq km)	1971	List
Guánica				Town	72055	13,787	37.05 sq mi (95.96 sq km)	1914	List
Guayama				Town	72057	36,614	64.99 sq mi (168.32 sq km)	1736	List
Guayanilla				Town	72059	17,784	42.27 sq mi (109.48 sq km)	1833	List
Guaynabo				City	72061	89,780	27.58 sq mi (71.43 sq km)	1769	List
Gurabo				Town	72063	40,622	27.89 sq mi (72.23 sq km)	1815	List
Hatillo				Town	72065	38,486	41.78 sq mi (108.21 sq km)	1823	List
Hormigueros				Town	72067	15,654	11.34 sq mi (29.37 sq km)	1874	List
Humacao				City	72069	50,896	44.75 sq mi (115.90 sq km)	1722	List
Isabela				Town	72071	42,943	55.30 sq mi (143.23 sq km)	1819	List
Jayuya				Town	72073	14,779	44.53 sq mi (115.33 sq km)	1911	List
Juana Díaz				Town	72075	46,538	60.28 sq mi (156.12 sq km)	1798	List
Juncos				Town	72077	37,012	26.49 sq mi (68.61 sq km)	1797	List
Lajas				Town	72079	23,334	59.95 sq mi (159.15 sq km)	1883	List
Lares				Town	72081	28,105	61.45 sq mi (159.15 sq km)	1827	List
Las Marías				Town	72083	8,874	46.36 sq mi (120.07 sq km)	1871	List
Las Piedras				Town	72085	35,180	33.88 sq mi (87.75 sq km)	1773	List
Loíza				Town	72087	23,693	19.37 sq mi (50.17 sq km)	1719	List
Luquillo				Town	72089	17,781	25.81 sq mi (66.85 sq km)	1797	List
Manatí				Town	72091	39,492	46.13 sq mi (119.48 sq km)	1738	List
Maricao				Town	72093	4,755	36.62 sq mi (94.85 sq km)	1874	List
Maunabo				Town	72095	10,589	21.07 sq mi (54.57 sq km)	1799	List
Mayagüez				City	72097	73,077	77.65 sq mi (201.11 sq km)	1760	List
Moca				Town	72099	37,460	50.34 sq mi (130.38 sq km)	1772	List
Morovis				Town	72101	28,727	38.87 sq mi (100.67 sq km)	1818	List
Naguabo				Town	72103	23,386	51.66 sq mi (133.80 sq km)	1821	List
Naranjito				Town	72105	29,241	27.40 sq mi (70.97 sq km)	1824	List
Orocovis				Town	72107	21,434	63.62 sq mi (164.78 sq km)	1825	List
Patillas				Town	72109	15,985	46.7 sq mi (120.95 sq km)	1811	List
Peñuelas				Town	72111	20,399	44.62 sq mi (115.57 sq km)	1793	List
Ponce				City	72113	137,491	114.76 sq mi (297.23 sq km)	1692	List
Quebradillas				Town	72115	23,638	22.68 sq mi (58.74 sq km)	1823	List
Rincón				Town	72117	15,187	14.29 sq mi (37.01 sq km)	1771	List
Río Grande				Town	72119	47,060	60.62 sq mi (157.01 sq km)	1840	List
Sabana Grande				Town	72121	22,729	35.83 sq mi (92.80 sq km)	1813	List
Salinas				Town	72123	25,789	69.37 sq mi (179.67 sq km)	1851	List
San Germán				Town	72125	31,879	54.50 sq mi (141.15 sq km)	1573	List
San Juan				City	72127	342,259	47.85 sq mi (123.93 sq km)	1519	List
San Lorenzo				Town	72129	37,693	53.11 sq mi (137.55 sq km)	1811	List
San Sebastián				Town	72131	39,345	70.42 sq mi (182.39 sq km)	1752	List
Santa Isabel				Town	72133	20,281	34.02 sq mi (88.119 sq km)	1842	List
Toa Alta				City	72135	66,852	27.02 sq mi (69.98 sq km)	1751	List
Toa Baja				City	72137	75,293	23.24 sq mi (60.19 sq km)	1745	List
Trujillo Alto				City	72139	67,740	20.76 sq mi (53.77 sq km)	1801	List
Utuado				Town	72141	28,287	113.53 sq mi (294.04 sq km)	1739	List
Vega Alta				Town	72143	35,395	27.73 sq mi (71.82 sq km)	1775	List
Vega Baja				City	72145	54,414	45.86 sq mi (118.78 sq km)	1776	List
Vieques				Town	72147	8,249	50.77 sq mi (131.49 sq km)	1852	List
Villalba				Town	72149	22,093	35.64 sq mi (92.31 sq km)	1917	List
Yabucoa				Town	72151	30,412	55.21 sq mi (142.99 sq km)	1793	List
Yauco				Town	72153	34,172	68.19 sq mi (176.61 sq km)	1756	List

=== Most populated municipalities ===
Municipalities with more than 100,000 inhabitants

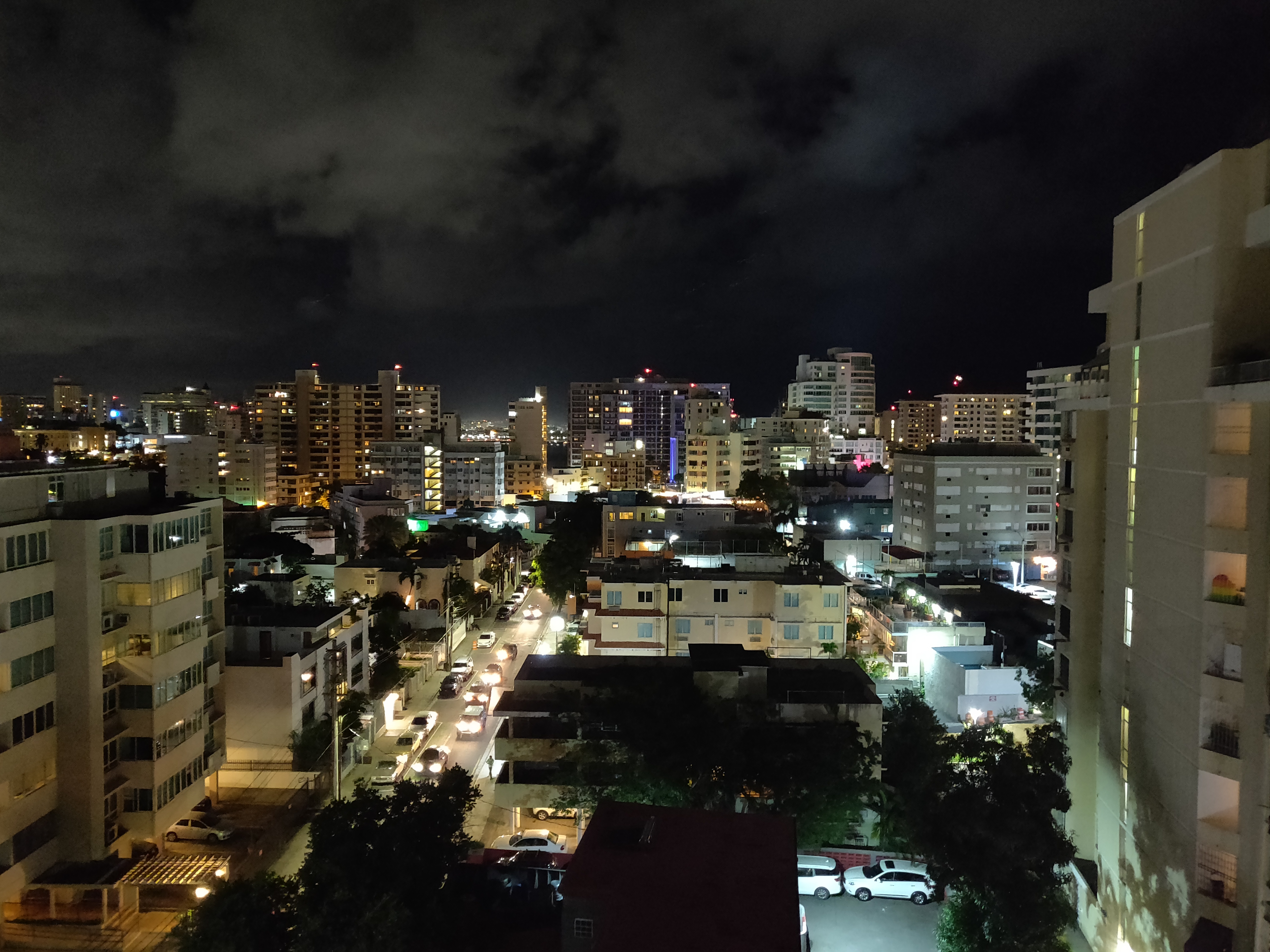
San Juan, the largest municipality and capital of Puerto Rico.

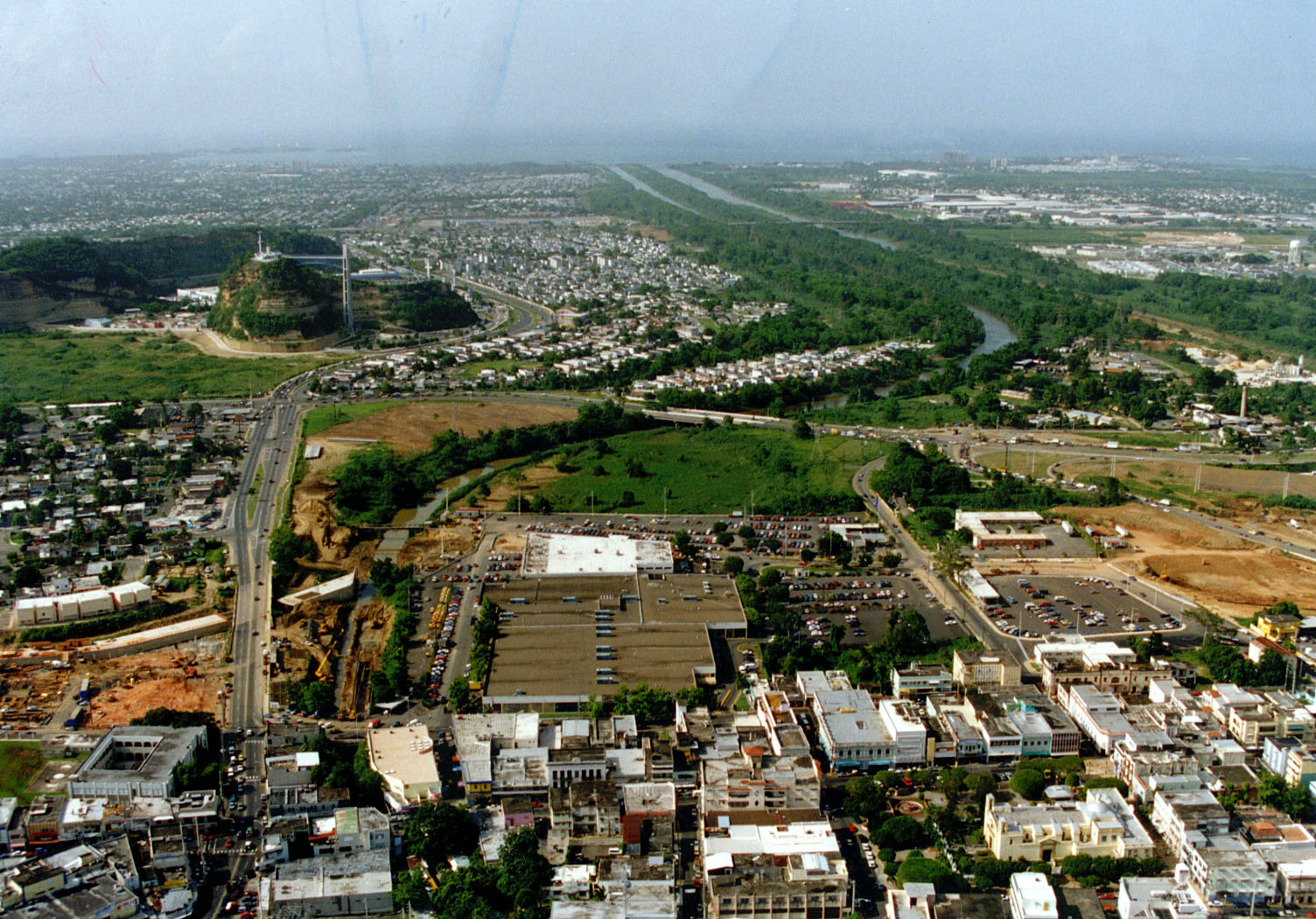
Bayamón, the second largest municipality of Puerto Rico, located just west of San Juan.

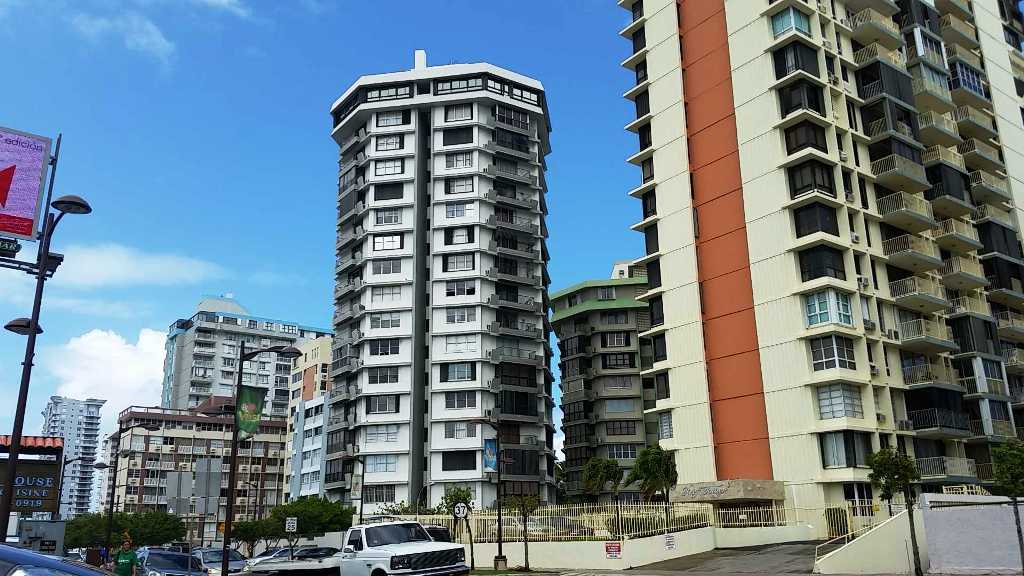
Carolina, the third largest municipality of Puerto Rico, located just east of San Juan.

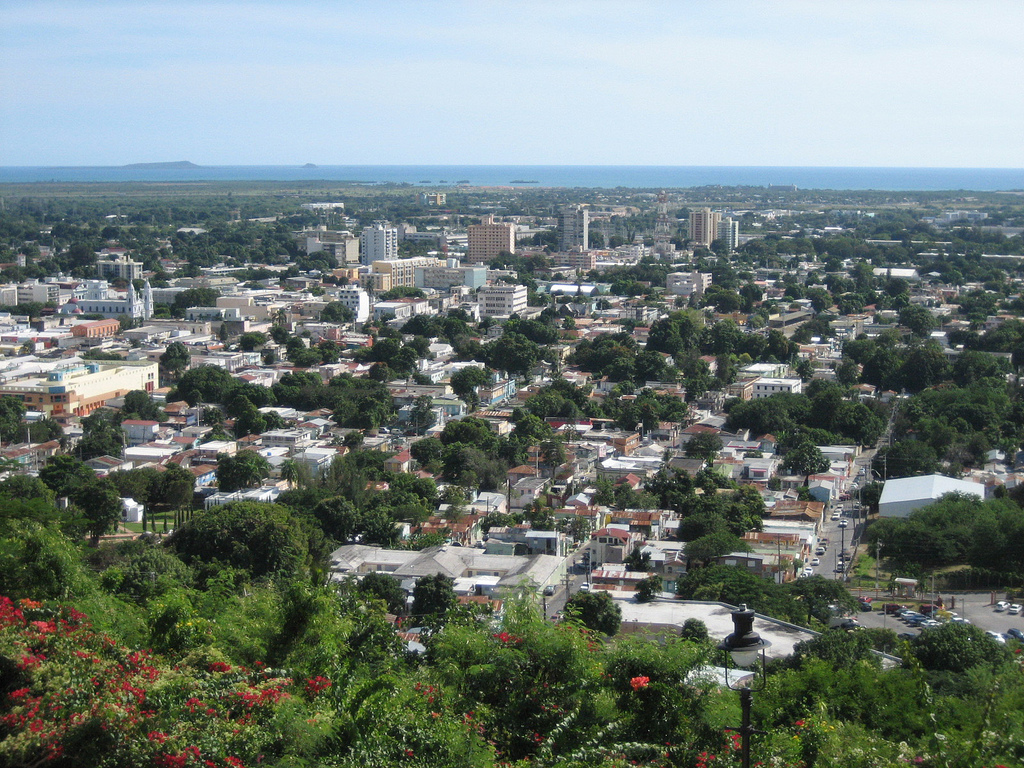
Ponce, the fourth largest municipality of Puerto Rico and the largest municipality outside the San Juan metropolitan area.

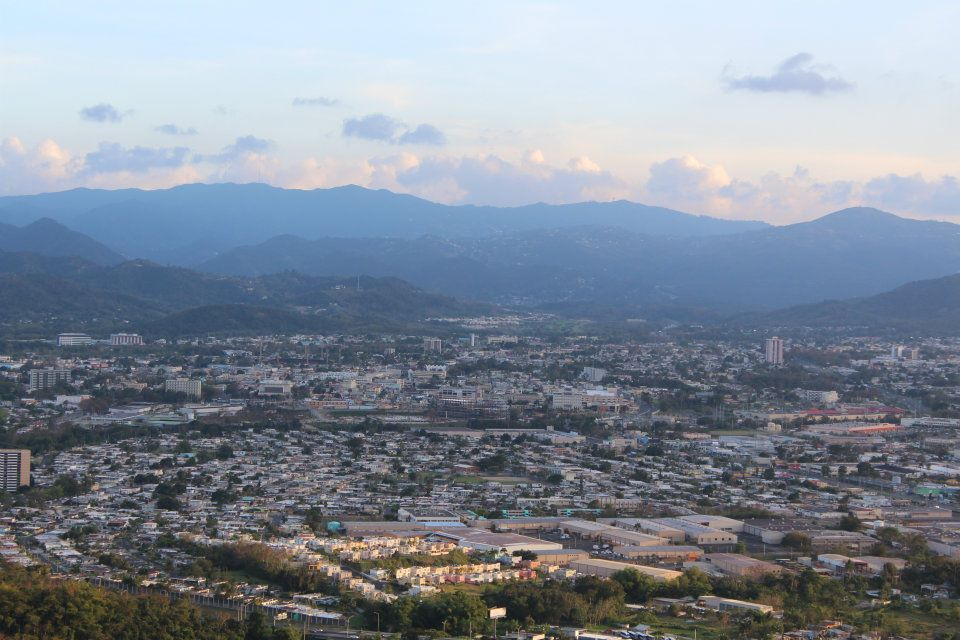
Caguas, the fifth largest municipality of Puerto Rico.

== Administration ==
Since 2020, the municipalities are organized under the Municipal Code of Puerto Rico (Law. No. 107 of 2020). They were previously governed under by the Law of Autonomous Municipalities of Puerto Rico (Law. No. 81 of 1991), which established that every municipality must have an elected strong mayor with a municipal legislature as the form of government. Each legislature must be unicameral, with the number of members related to adequate representation of the total population of the municipality. In contrast to other jurisdictions, both the mayors and the municipal legislators are elected on the same date and for the same term of four years in office.

From a political and ekistic perspective, several differences and similarities exist between municipalities of differing population sizes. For instance, municipalities with 50,000 inhabitants or more are considered incorporated cities, while those with fewer than 50,000 are considered incorporated towns. Size affects the autonomy exercised by the jurisdiction: cities provide and manage their own services, while towns typically depend on nearby cities for certain services. Demographically, municipalities in Puerto Rico are equivalent to counties in the United States, and Puerto Rican municipalities are registered as county subdivisions in the United States census. Statistically, the municipality with the largest number of inhabitants is San Juan, with 342,259, while Culebra is the smallest, with around 1,792. Arecibo is the largest in terms of geography, with around 125 mi^{2}, and Cataño the smallest, with around 4.8 mi^{2}.

Except for San Juan, Ponce, Florida, and Vieques, all municipalities have a barrio equivalent to a downtown area in the U.S. called pueblo, officially known as barrio-pueblo (literally "ward-town"), which typically is the site of the historic Spanish colonial settlement, administrative center, and urban core of the municipality. However, municipalities with large populations, like Ponce, may have an urban core that consist of several barrios.

In Recent Civic Architecture in Porto Rico by Adrian C. Finlayson, architect for the Insular Department of the Interior Architecture, writing for the publication Architectural Record in 1920, the Puerto Rican municipality is accurately described as:

Not merely a city, but something similar to a wide-extending township in New England—like Plymouth, Massachusetts, or Barnstable, on Cape Cod comprising a central town or city with perhaps several outlying districts or barrios, usually rural in character, and occasionally having sizeable concentrated populations in villages, the municipality bearing the name of the central urban portion and all under one local government.

— Recent Civic Architecture in Porto Rico, 1920

== Finances ==
In 2012, 36 of the 78 municipalities (46%) were experiencing a budget deficit. In total, the combined debt carried by the municipalities stands at about US$590 million. (Note: WAPA-TV (2014; in Spanish) "El informe sobre la medida señala que al presente los municipios arrastran una deuda agregada de aproximadamente $590 millones [...]")

Surplus Deficit
Municipality	Mayor's party	Population	Surplus or deficit	Surplus or deficit per capita	Public debt	Public debt per capita
Adjuntas	PNP	19,483	$ / 525,858	$ / 26.99	$	$
Aguada	PPD	41,959	$ / 2,209,807	$ / 52.67	$	$
Aguadilla	PNP	60,949	$ / 10,220,728	$ / 167.69	$	$
Aguas Buenas	PPD	28,659	$ / (1,638,355)	$ / (57.17)	$ / 9,183,000	$ / 320.42
Aibonito	PNP	25,900	$ / 681,875	$ / 26.33	$	$
Añasco	PPD	29,261	$ / 2,074,042	$ / 70.88	$	$
Arecibo	PNP	96,440	$ / (17,784,327)	$ / (184.41)	$ / 63,403,451	$ / 657.44
Arroyo	PPD	19,575	$ / (390,219)	$ / (19.93)	$ / 10,521,000	$ / 537.47
Barceloneta	PPD	24,816	$ / (8,833,426)	$ / (355.96)	$ / 59,354,780	$ / 2,391.79
Barranquitas	PNP	30,318	$ / 6,673,615	$ / 220.12	$	$
Bayamón	PNP	208,116	$ / 4,179,967	$ / 20.08	$ / 243,233,534	$ / 1,168.74
Cabo Rojo	PPD	50,917	$ / (60,841)	$ / (1.19)	$ / 35,561,000	$ / 698.41
Caguas	PPD	142,893	$ / 16,938,668	$ / 118.54	$ / 267,248,251	$ / 1,870.27
Camuy	PNP	35,159	$ / (1,810,542)	$ / (51.50)	$ / 11,603,000	$ / 330.02
Canóvanas	PNP	47,648	$ / 203,324	$ / 4.27	$	$
Carolina	PPD	176,762	$ / 32,757,250	$ / 185.32	$ / 350,605,890	$ / 1,983.49
Cataño	PPD	28,140	$ / (11,320,761)	$ / (402.30)	$ / 47,386,000	$ / 1,683.94
Cayey	PPD	48,119	$ / 7,544,584	$ / 156.79	$	$
Ceiba	PNP	13,631	$ / 1,833,525	$ / 134.51	$	$
Ciales	PPD	18,782	$ / (5,465,145)	$ / (290.98)	$ / 9,829,100	$ / 523.33
Cidra	PNP	43,480	$ / (1,053,391)	$ / (24.23)	$ / 29,445,000	$ / 677.21
Coamo	PPD	40,512	$ / 1,672,291	$ / 41.28	$	$
Comerío	PPD	20,778	$ / 188,417	$ / 9.07	$	$
Corozal	PPD	37,142	$ / 854,163	$ / 23.00	$	$
Culebra	PPD	1,818	$ / 802,707	$ / 441.53	$	$
Dorado	PPD	38,165	$ / 2,620,615	$ / 68.67	$	$
Fajardo	PNP	36,993	$ / 17,821,689	$ / 481.76	$	$
Florida	PNP	12,680	$ / (1,619,740)	$ / (127.74)	$ / 3,702,000	$ / 291.96
Guánica	PNP	19,427	$ / (5,319,384)	$ / (273.81)	$ / 8,815,000	$ / 453.75
Guayama	PPD	45,362	$ / 1,987,097	$ / 43.81	$	$
Guayanilla	PPD	21,581	$ / (2,706,166)	$ / (125.40)	$ / 16,818,000	$ / 779.30
Guaynabo	PNP	97,924	$ / 8,216,448	$ / 83.91	$ / 290,116,691	$ / 2,962.67
Gurabo	PNP	45,369	$ / (5,797,927)	$ / (127.79)	$ / 46,390,045	$ / 1,022.51
Hatillo	PPD	41,953	$ / (1,024,986)	$ / (24.43)	$ / 15,456,830	$ / 368.43
Hormigueros	PPD	17,250	$ / 1,288,509	$ / 74.70	$	$
Humacao	PPD	58,466	$ / 11,360,216	$ / 194.30	$	$
Isabela	PPD	45,631	$ / 24,738,813	$ / 542.15	$ / 16,397,000	$ / 359.34
Jayuya	PPD	16,642	$ / 629,946	$ / 37.85	$	$
Juana Díaz	PPD	79,897	$ / 32,789,400	$ / 97.89	$ / 22,005,000	$ / 433.62
Juncos	PPD	40,290	$ / (2,994,898)	$ / (74.33)	$ / 44,404,819	$ / 1,102.13
Lajas	PPD	25,753	$ / (1,988,168)	$ / (77.20)	$ / 11,075,000	$ / 430.05
Lares	PNP	30,753	$ / (3,361,629)	$ / (109.31)	$ / 5,339,000	$ / 173.61
Las Marías	PPD	9,881	$ / 660,746	$ / 66.87	$	$
Las Piedras	PNP	38,675	$ / 362,063	$ / 9.36	$	$
Loíza	PNP	30,060	$ / (3,171,401)	$ / (105.50)	$ / 9,207,000	$ / 306.29
Luquillo	PPD	20,068	$ / 1,646,739	$ / 82.06	$	$
Manatí	PNP	44,113	$ / (12,622,526)	$ / (286.14)	$ / 52,688,487	$ / 1,194.40
Maricao	PNP	6,276	$ / (1,812,106)	$ / (288.74)	$ / 10,928,300	$ / 1,741.28
Maunabo	PPD	12,225	$ / (2,678,351)	$ / (219.09)	$ / 8,600,000	$ / 703.48
Mayagüez	PPD	89,080	$ / 10,816,117	$ / 121.42	$	$
Moca	PNP	40,109	$ / 632,570	$ / 15.77	$	$
Morovis	PNP	32,610	$ / (3,742,360)	$ / (114.76)	$ / 20,239,020	$ / 620.64
Naguabo	PNP	26,720	$ / (3,737,140)	$ / (139.86)	$ / 7,905,100	$ / 295.85
Naranjito	PNP	30,402	$ / 1,581,161	$ / 52.01	$	$
Orocovis	PNP	23,423	$ / 367,461	$ / 15.69	$	$
Patillas	PPD	19,277	$ / (6,001,248)	$ / (311.32)	$ / 17,179,000	$ / 891.17
Peñuelas	PPD	24,282	$ / 4,106,788	$ / 169.13	$	$
Ponce	PNP	166,327	$ / (18,480,789)	$ / (111.11)	$ / 190,625,905	$ / 1,146.09
Quebradillas	PPD	25,919	$ / 2,327,410	$ / 89.80	$	$
Rincón	PPD	15,200	$ / 1,992,326	$ / 131.07	$	$
Río Grande	PPD	54,304	$ / (4,147,852)	$ / (76.38)	$ / 32,059,000	$ / 590.36
Sabana Grande	PPD	25,265	$ / (2,835,535)	$ / (112.23)	$ / 10,176,423	$ / 402.79
Salinas	PPD	31,078	$ / (8,546,853)	$ / (275.01)	$ / 14,650,000	$ / 471.39
San Germán	PPD	35,527	$ / 760,077	$ / 21.39	$	$
San Juan	PPD	395,326	$ / (45,455,571)	$ / (114.98)	$ / 668,238,329	$ / 1,690.35
San Lorenzo	PPD	41,058	$ / (2,998,994)	$ / (73.04)	$ / 27,034,000	$ / 658.43
San Sebastián	PNP	42,430	$ / 2,296,524	$ / 54.13	$	$
Santa Isabel	PNP	23,274	$ / (3,900,907)	$ / (167.61)	$ / 23,273,736	$ / 999.99
Toa Alta	PPD	74,066	$ / (3,387,399)	$ / (45.73)	$ / 33,140,000	$ / 447.44
Toa Baja	PNP	89,609	$ / (10,543,311)	$ / (117.66)	$ / 116,363,919	$ / 1,298.57
Trujillo Alto	PPD	74,842	$ / (1,736,394)	$ / (23.20)	$ / 55,516,000	$ / 741.78
Utuado	PPD	33,149	$ / (3,007,984)	$ / (90.74)	$ / 8,174,000	$ / 246.58
Vega Alta	PNP	39,951	$ / 3,408,501	$ / 85.32	$	$
Vega Baja	PPD	59,662	$ / (1,849,612)	$ / (31.00)	$ / 44,303,000	$ / 742.57
Vieques	PPD	9,301	$ / (6,672,774)	$ / (717.43)	$ / 12,420,100	$ / 1,335.35
Villalba	PPD	26,073	$ / (2,228,520)	$ / (85.47)	$ / 9,969,216	$ / 382.36
Yabucoa	PPD	37,941	$ / (2,216,509)	$ / (58.42)	$ / 17,394,380	$ / 458.46
Yauco	PNP	42,043	$ / (5,049,263)	$ / (120.10)	$ / 39,904,000	$ / 949.12

== Racial composition ==
The following is an alphabetical list of the municipalities and their population together with a breakdown of their racial composition.

Municipality (2020)	White (both Hispanic and Non-Hispanic)	Black (Both Hispanic and Non-Hispanic)	Amerindian (Both Hispanic and Non-Hispanic)	Asian (Both Hispanic and Non-Hispanic)	Two or more races or some other race (Both Hispanic and Non-Hispanic)	Hispanic (Of any Race)
Adjuntas	22.2	3.4	4.2	0.1	65.1	99.7
Aguada	22.7	4.1	3.0	0.2	63.5	99.3
Aguadilla	21.0	4.1	3.5	0.2	62.9	98.4
Aguas Buenas	14.5	7.2	3.3	0.3	61.4	99.5
Aibonito	19.4	5.4	3.3	0.1	64.8	99.1
Añasco	18.4	5.7	3.4	0.2	63.9	99.0
Arecibo	19.0	4.6	2.2	0.2	66.6	99.3
Arroyo	11.5	12.5	1.9	0.4	60.4	99.1
Barceloneta	15.8	4.1	2.4	0.2	67.4	99.5
Barranquitas	20.8	5.2	2.1	0.1	66.2	99.7
Bayamón	17.9	6.2	3.0	0.3	62.5	99.0
Cabo Rojo	20.3	3.8	2.8	0.2	65.7	98.8
Caguas	15.9	6.3	3.1	0.3	63.9	99.2
Camuy	22.7	3.8	3.0	0.1	64.2	99.1
Canóvanas	13.4	15.1	2.6	0.3	50.3	99.3
Carolina	14.2	11.6	2.6	0.4	55.5	98.5
Cataño	13.0	8.2	2.9	0.3	62.0	99.0
Cayey	17.4	6.3	2.5	0.2	65.3	99.4
Ceiba	16.0	9.8	2.6	0.4	57.2	98.2
Ciales	20.8	2.9	2.1	0.3	69.6	99.5
Cidra	19.5	6.8	2.7	0.1	62.6	99.5
Coamo	20.0	7.4	2.8	0.2	61.6	99.4
Comerío	16.9	6.4	4.1	0.2	63.3	99.6
Corozal	19.8	3.7	2.5	0.2	67.7	99.5
Culebra	17.7	8.0	1.7	1.1	51.8	89.2
Dorado	17.6	7.5	3.1	0.6	58.1	96.6
Fajardo	14.5	9.3	2.5	0.4	61.3	98.2
Florida	13.8	2.1	1.4	0.3	74.9	99.5
Guánica	17.1	5.2	2.7	0.2	67.2	99.1
Guayama	19.0	9.6	2.6	0.2	56.6	99.3
Guayanilla	18.1	5.1	3.6	0.1	64.7	99.6
Guaynabo	17.2	4.8	2.6	0.4	66.2	97.9
Gurabo	15.2	7.1	3.3	0.2	61.8	99.2
Hatillo	21.2	3.5	2.5	0.2	66.1	99.2
Hormigueros	18.8	5.1	2.8	0.2	65.0	99.2
Humacao	13.5	8.8	2.5	0.3	62.4	98.0
Isabela	17.5	4.0	2.4	0.2	67.1	98.7
Jayuya	23.3	2.4	3.3	0.1	65.8	99.5
Juana Díaz	14.5	8.0	2.7	0.2	63.8	99.5
Juncos	13.0	9.3	2.9	0.2	61.0	99.4
Lajas	18.9	4.1	2.6	0.2	67.4	99.3
Lares	20.5	2.2	2.5	0.1	70.1	99.3
Las Marías	17.2	3.5	3.1	0.3	69.4	99.2
Las Piedras	15.6	8.3	2.9	0.2	60.3	99.4
Loíza	5.8	31.8	1.6	0.2	27.7	99.4
Luquillo	17.2	12.1	2.7	0.3	54.1	97.1
Manatí	17.1	4.3	2.2	0.2	67.8	99.3
Maricao	22.2	7.8	3.7	0.5	61.0	99.5
Maunabo	9.1	16.7	2.0	0.2	56.0	99.4
Mayagüez	19.7	4.6	3.0	0.3	63.2	98.7
Moca	17.0	3.1	2.6	0.1	70.8	99.6
Morovis	19.1	3.4	2.5	0.2	69.4	99.6
Naguabo	13.3	9.2	2.4	0.2	63.2	99.2
Naranjito	20.7	6.4	3.3	0.2	61.0	99.6
Orocovis	16.3	5.3	6.4	0.2	62.6	99.6
Patillas	15.9	12.3	2.6	0.2	57.2	99.3
Peñuelas	23.1	6.7	3.8	0.1	57.2	99.5
Ponce	19.0	4.9	3.0	0.3	64.4	99.1
Quebradillas	25.4	3.4	3.2	0.2	62.6	99.2
Rincón	21.4	5.9	4.9	0.2	58.5	94.9
Río Grande	14.7	14.7	2.6	0.3	50.4	98.8
Sabana Grande	19.9	4.0	2.4	0.2	66.6	99.4
Salinas	16.3	9.8	3.8	0.2	57.6	99.2
San Germán	18.5	4.6	3.8	0.3	64.1	99.2
San Juan	14.4	8.2	2.7	0.5	60.2	97.8
San Lorenzo	14.0	6.6	2.7	0.2	66.0	99.5
San Sebastián	19.2	2.1	2.9	0.1	70.4	99.4
Santa Isabel	15.7	8.2	2.6	0.2	60.8	99.4
Toa Alta	16.2	5.8	2.7	0.2	65.8	99.4
Toa Baja	16.3	10.1	2.2	0.3	59.1	99.0
Trujillo Alto	14.2	8.0	2.3	0.2	62.6	99.1
Utuado	21.6	2.4	4.0	0.2	66.3	99.2
Vega Alta	12.4	7.3	2.4	0.3	66.6	98.8
Vega Baja	18.5	6.4	3.5	0.2	61.2	99.3
Vieques	18.8	15.2	2.6	0.4	52.2	92.0
Villalba	15.5	6.2	2.9	0.2	65.4	99.6
Yabucoa	16.5	9.7	2.6	0.2	60.6	99.4
Yauco	21.4	4.7	3.2	0.2	63.5	99.4
Puerto Rico	17.1	7.0	2.8	0.3	62.3	98.9

== Proposed amalgamation ==
Multiple times, politicians have discussed and proposed consolidating Puerto Rico's municipalities but so far no proposals has been adopted. In 1902 the Puerto Rico legislature, under pressure from the U.S.-appointed governor of Puerto Rico, passed a law consolidating the then-76 municipalities of Puerto Rico into 46. The law was repealed three years later. In October 2009, a Puerto Rican legislator proposed a bill that would reduce the current 78 municipalities of Puerto Rico down to 20. The bill called for a referendum to take place on June 13, 2010, which would let the people decide on the matter. However, the bill never made into law. With the Puerto Rican government-debt crisis that emerged in the first half of 2010s, a new plan to consolidate municipalities was again circulated in the legislature in 2017 as a way to alleviate the government debt crisis. In March 2019, then Governor Ricardo Rosselló created an initiative that would preserve the existing municipalities but create regional consolidation by sharing service overhead in the form of counties but he resigned prior to anything coming of his proposal.

== See also ==
- es:Organización territorial de Puerto Rico
