= Puerto Rico Highway 866 =

Highway in Puerto Rico

Highway 866
- Ruta 866

Route information
- Maintained by Puerto Rico DTPW
- Length: 7.8 km (4.8 mi)

Major junctions
- South end: PR-2 in Candelaria
- PR-865 in Candelaria; PR-22 in Sabana Seca; PR-867 in Sabana Seca; PR-872 in Sabana Seca; PR-868 in Sabana Seca
- North end: PR-167 in Sabana Seca

Location
- Country: United States
- Territory: Puerto Rico
- Municipalities: Toa Baja

Highway system
- Roads in Puerto Rico; List
← PR-864	→ PR-869

Puerto Rico Highway 866 (PR-866) is a main highway in the city of Toa Baja, Puerto Rico. It begins at its intersection with PR-2 in Candelaria and ends at PR-167 in Levittown.

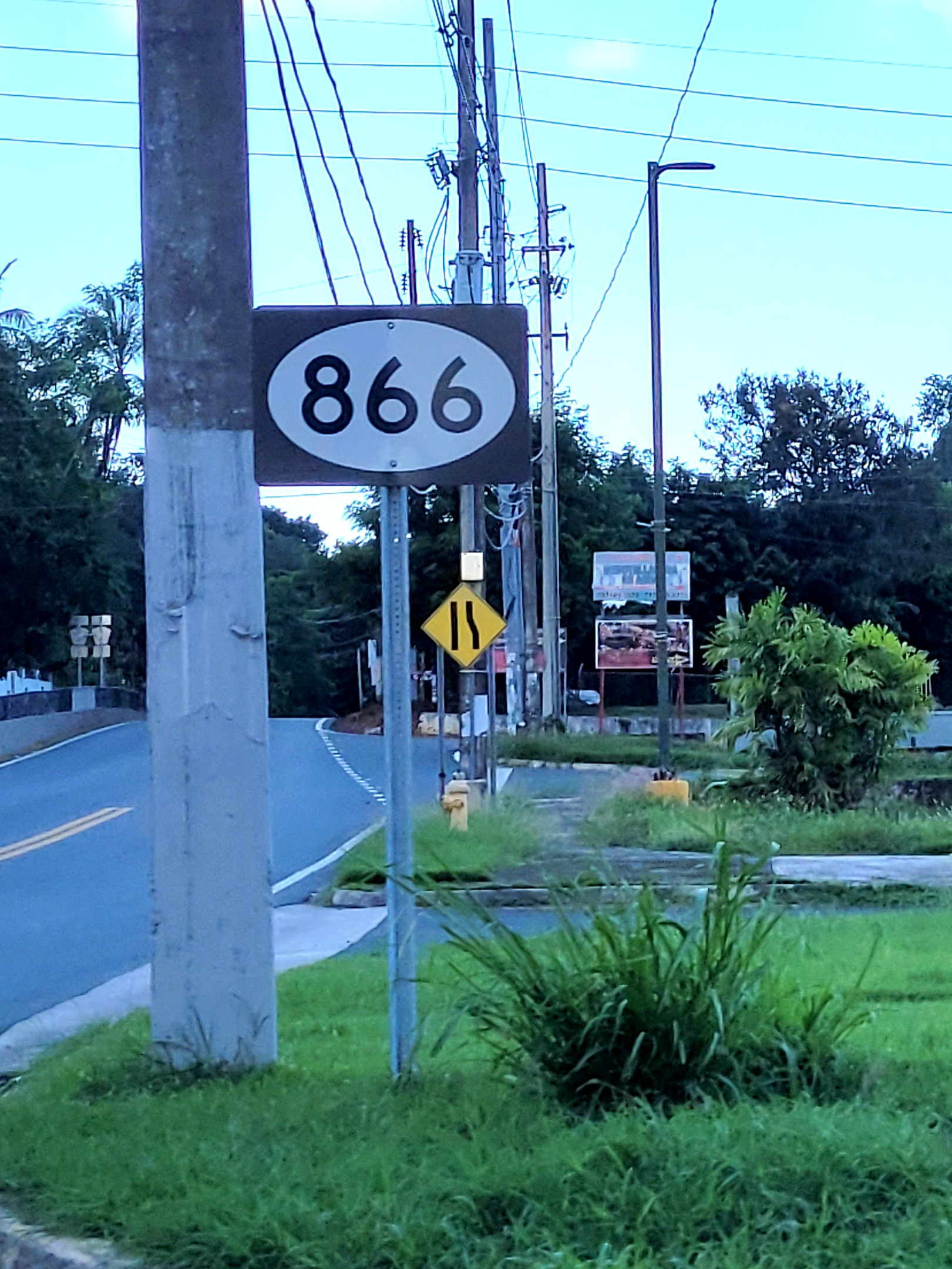
Puerto Rico Highway 866 north in Candelaria barrio

== Major intersections ==
The entire route is located in Toa Baja.

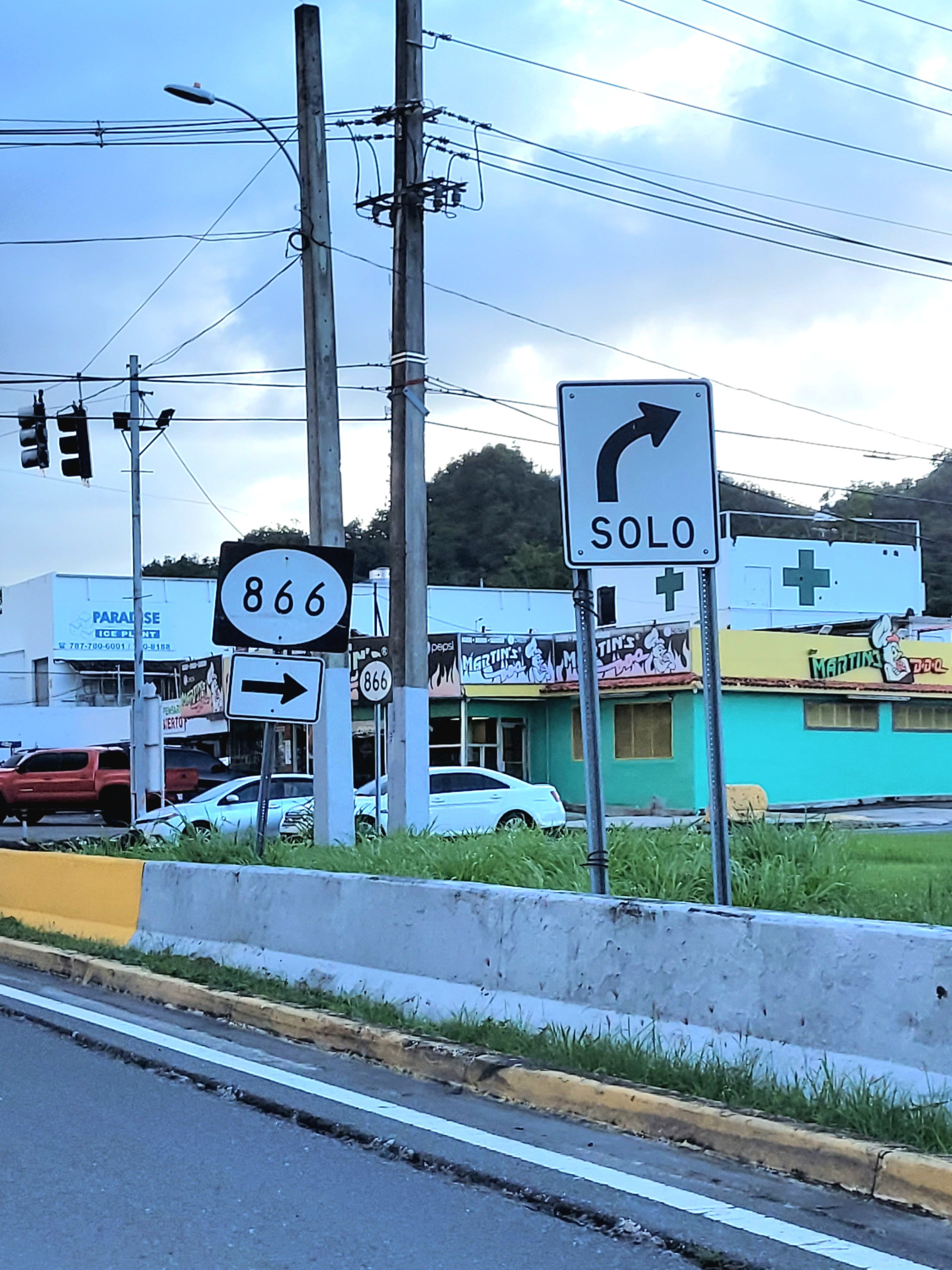
PR-2 west at its junction with PR-866 north in Candelaria barrio

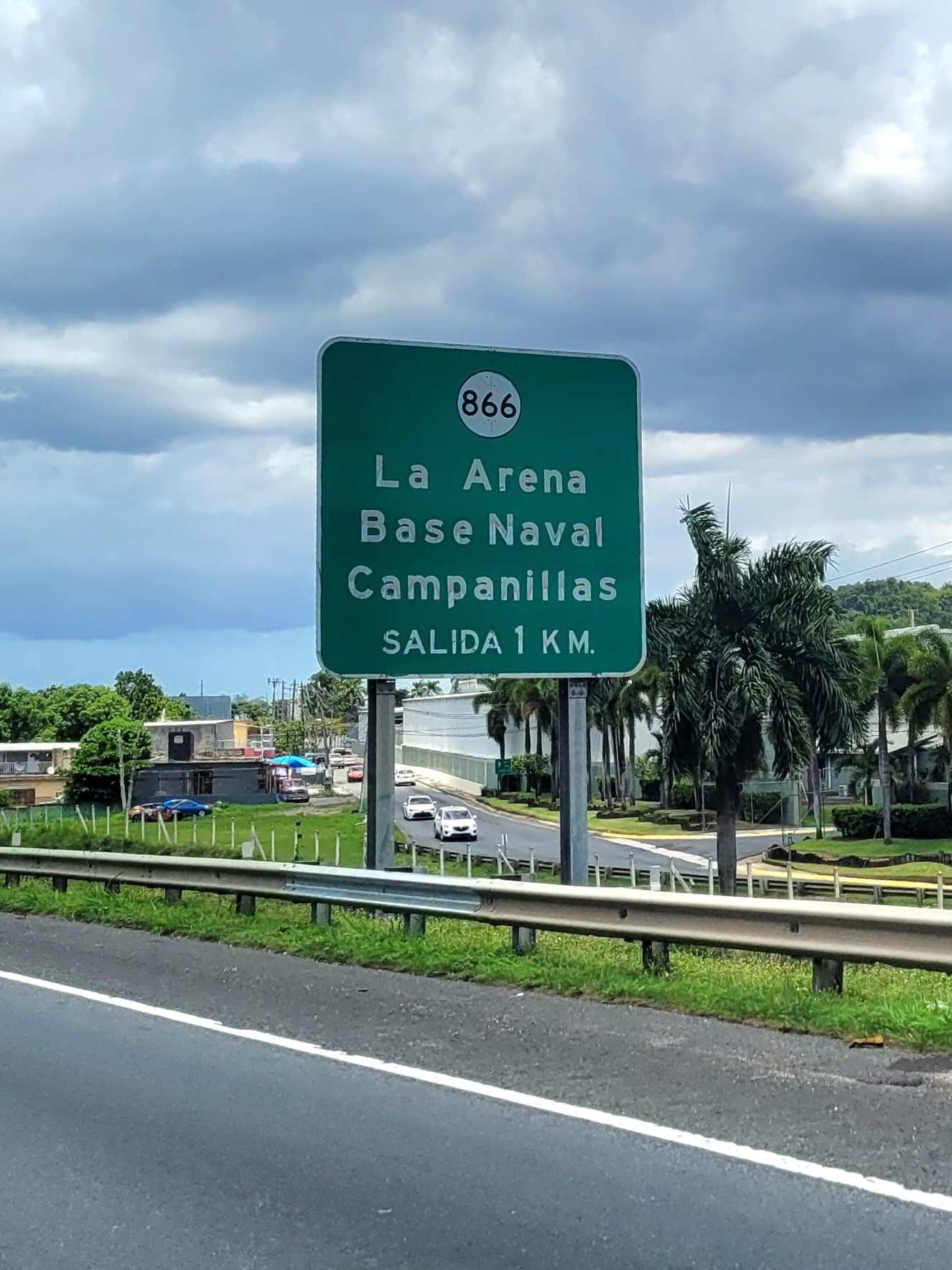
PR-22 east approaching exit 16 to PR-866 in Candelaria barrio

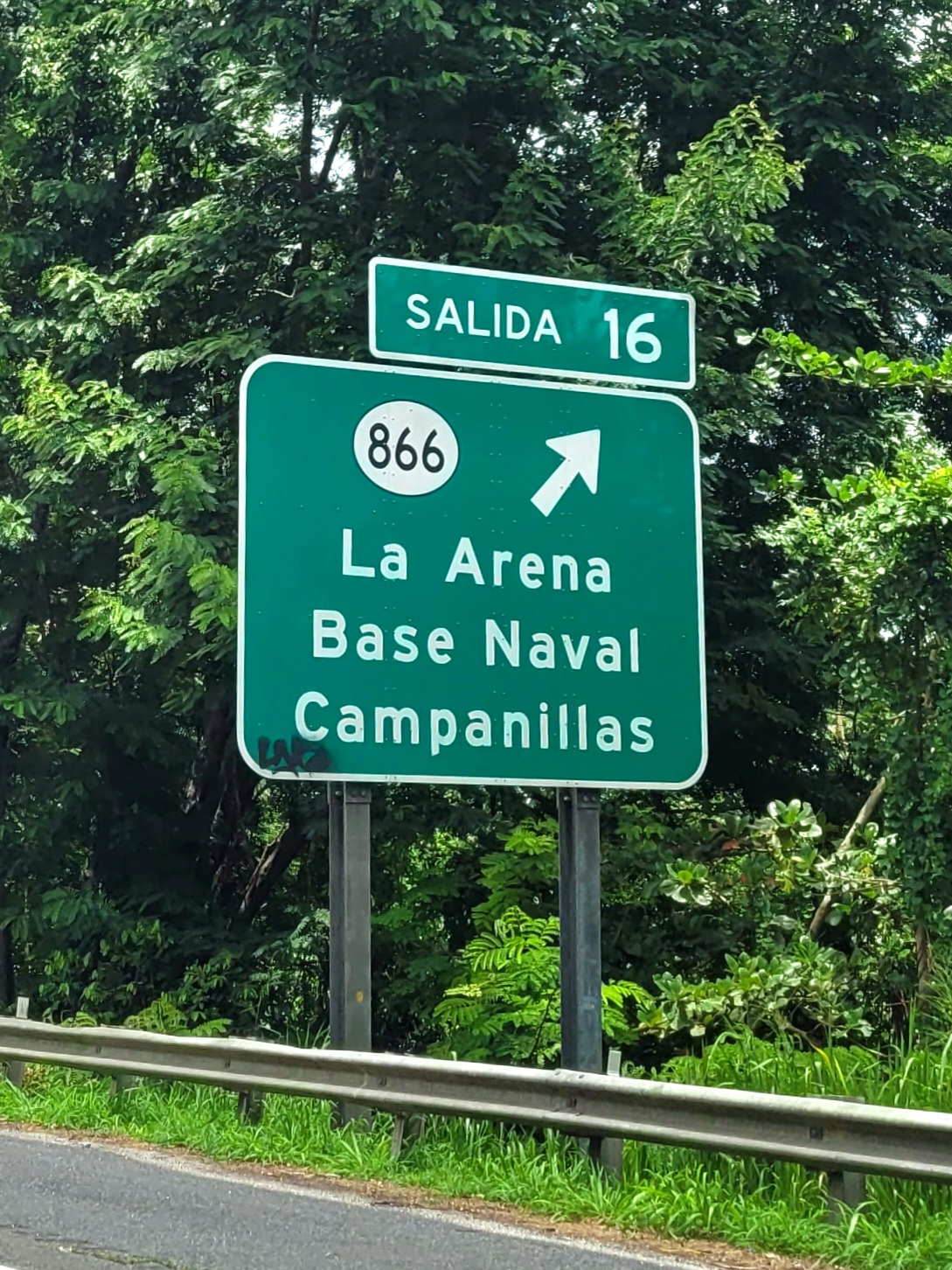
PR-22 east at exit 16 to PR-866 in Sabana Seca barrio

Location	km	mi	Destinations	Notes
Candelaria	0.0	0.0	PR-2 – Bayamón, Arecibo	Southern terminus of PR-866
Candelaria	1.2	0.75	PR-865 – Toa Baja, Candelaria Arenas	
Candelaria–Sabana Seca line	1.8	1.1	To PR-2 – Bayamón	
Sabana Seca	2.5– 2.8	1.6– 1.7	PR-22 (Autopista José de Diego) – San Juan, Arecibo	PR-22 exit 16; partial cloverleaf interchange
Sabana Seca	3.5– 3.6	2.2– 2.2	PR-867 – Toa Baja, Sabana Seca	
Sabana Seca	4.4	2.7	PR-872 – Bayamón	
Sabana Seca	5.8– 5.9	3.6– 3.7	PR-Avenida Juan "Picolino" Hernández Ferrer – Toa Baja, Sabana Seca	
Sabana Seca	6.8	4.2	PR-868 (Avenida Boulevard) – Levittown	Western terminus of PR-866 through Avenida Boulevard
Sabana Seca	7.8	4.8	PR-167 (Avenida Ramón Luis Rivera) – Bayamón, Comerío	Northern terminus of PR-866
1.000 mi = 1.609 km; 1.000 km = 0.621 mi: Route transition
