= Puerto Rico Highway 167 =

Highway in Puerto Rico

Highway 167
- Ruta 167

Route information
- Maintained by Puerto Rico DTPW
- Length: 28.4 km (17.6 mi)
- Existed: 1953–present

Major junctions
- South end: PR-156 / PR-7167 in Doña Elena
- PR-148 / PR-164 in Nuevo; PR-816 in Dajaos; PR-812 in Dajaos; PR-829 in Buena Vista; PR-830 in Buena Vista; PR-199 in Pájaros; PR-2 in Bayamón barrio-pueblo; PR-29 in Hato Tejas; PR-22 in Hato Tejas; PR-866 in Sabana Seca
- North end: PR-165 in Sabana Seca

Location
- Country: United States
- Territory: Puerto Rico
- Municipalities: Comerío, Naranjito, Toa Alta, Bayamón, Cataño, Toa Baja

Highway system
- Roads in Puerto Rico; List
← PR-166	→ PR-168

Puerto Rico Highway 167 (PR-167) is one of the main highways in the San Juan–Caguas–Guaynabo metropolitan area of Puerto Rico. Highway 167 starts at Puerto Rico Highway 165 in Levittown and goes until Puerto Rico Highway 156 in Comerío.

== Route description ==
It is two-lane per direction all through Cataño and a vast area of Bayamón, and becomes rural a couple of kilometers before entering Naranjito. During the rainy season this road is risky as there is chance of rock fall and debris onto the road. This occurs mainly due to an increase in the moisture content of the soil, which loosens the suspended rocks adjacent to the highway. It has been proposed to make this road fully parallel to the future tollway PR-5, which will be extended until Comerío. The future tollway will pass through the only cable-suspended bridge in the island in Bayamón near the border with Naranjito.

The Plata Bridge, a Parker truss bridge built in 1908, was the original connection for route 167 across the Río La Plata, spanning between Bayamón and Naranjito municipalities. It has been replaced by an adjacent modern bridge that now carries PR-167.

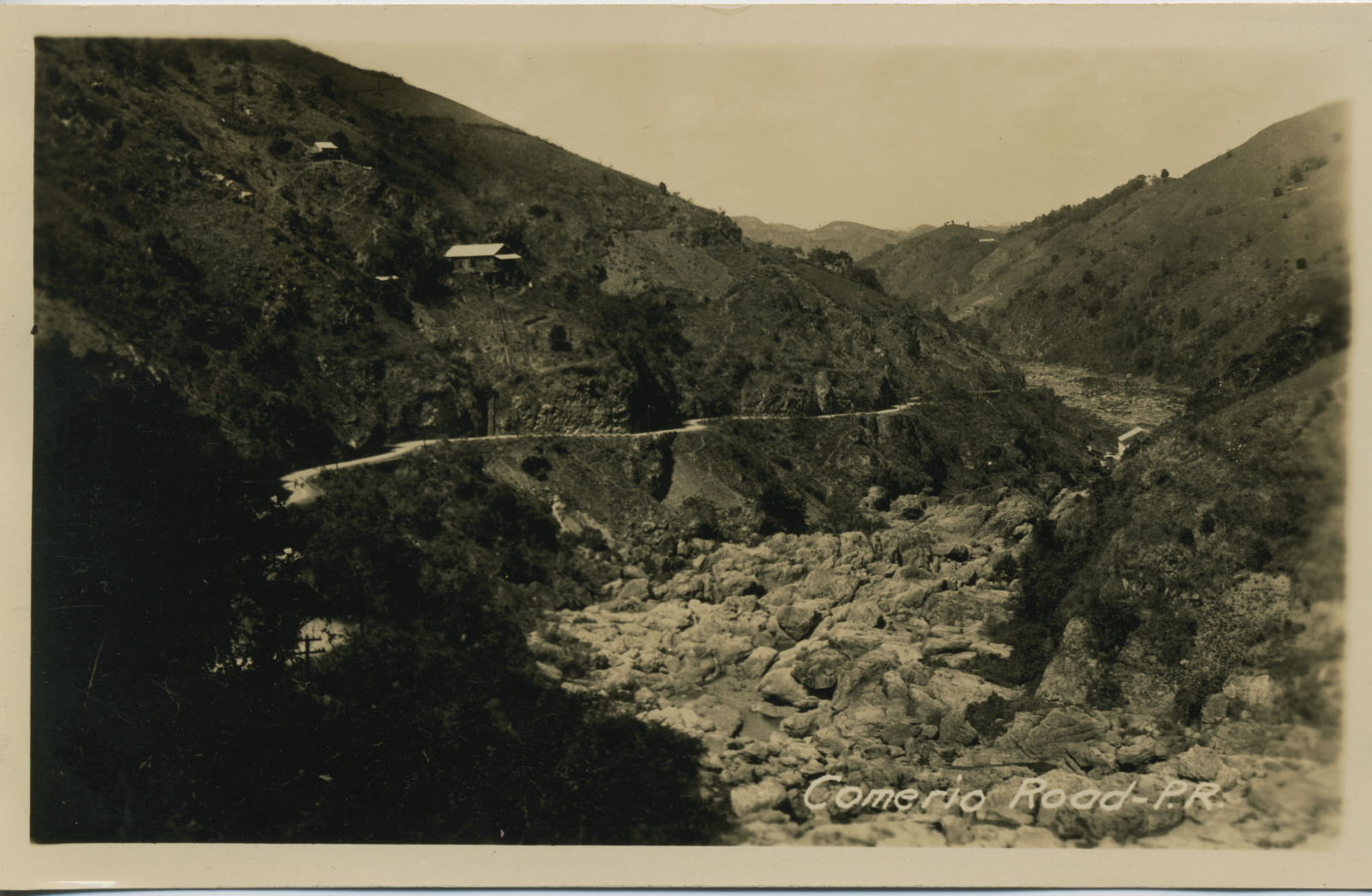
Comerío Road (circa 1900–1917)

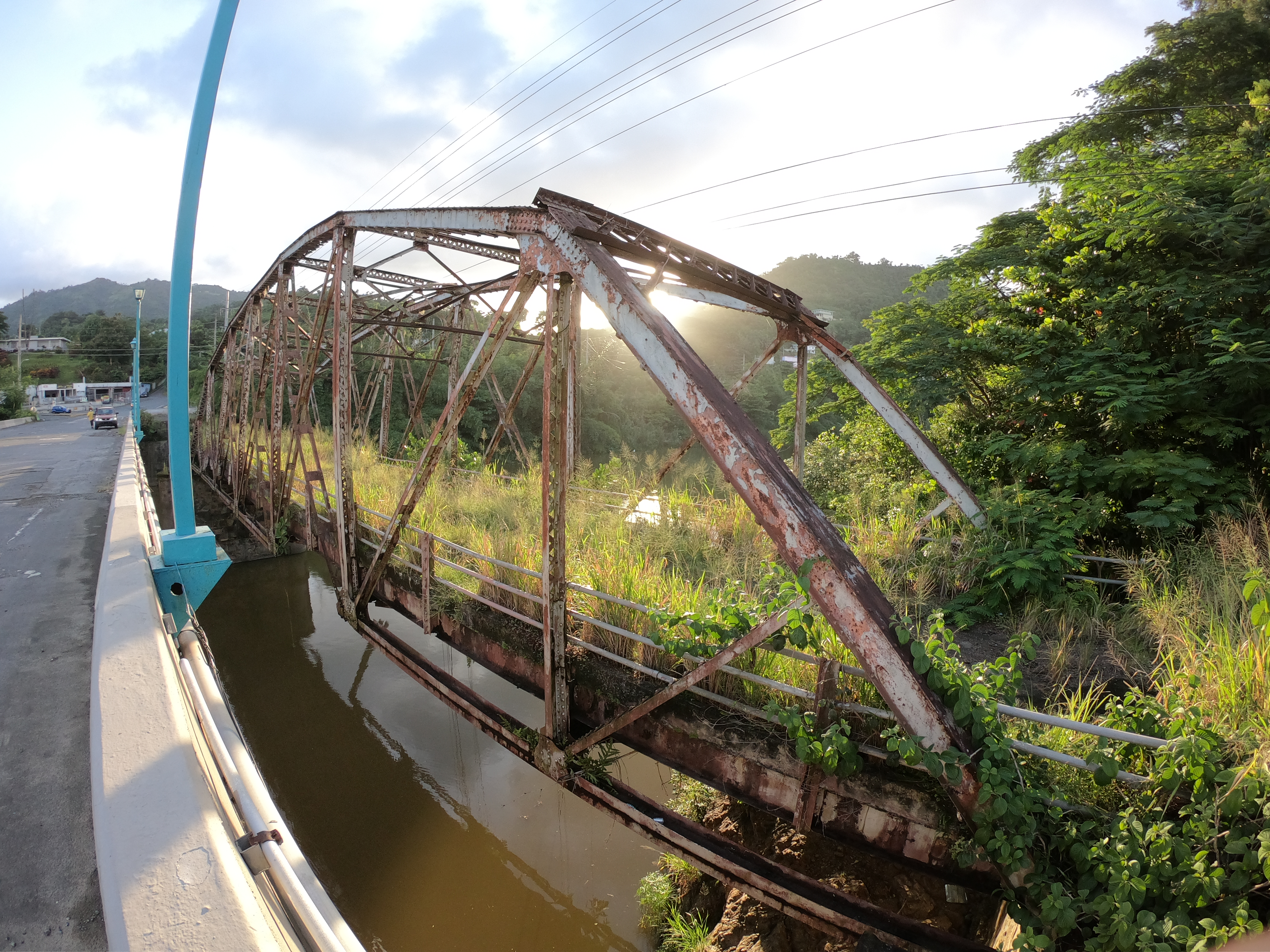
Plata Bridge from PR-167

== Major intersections ==
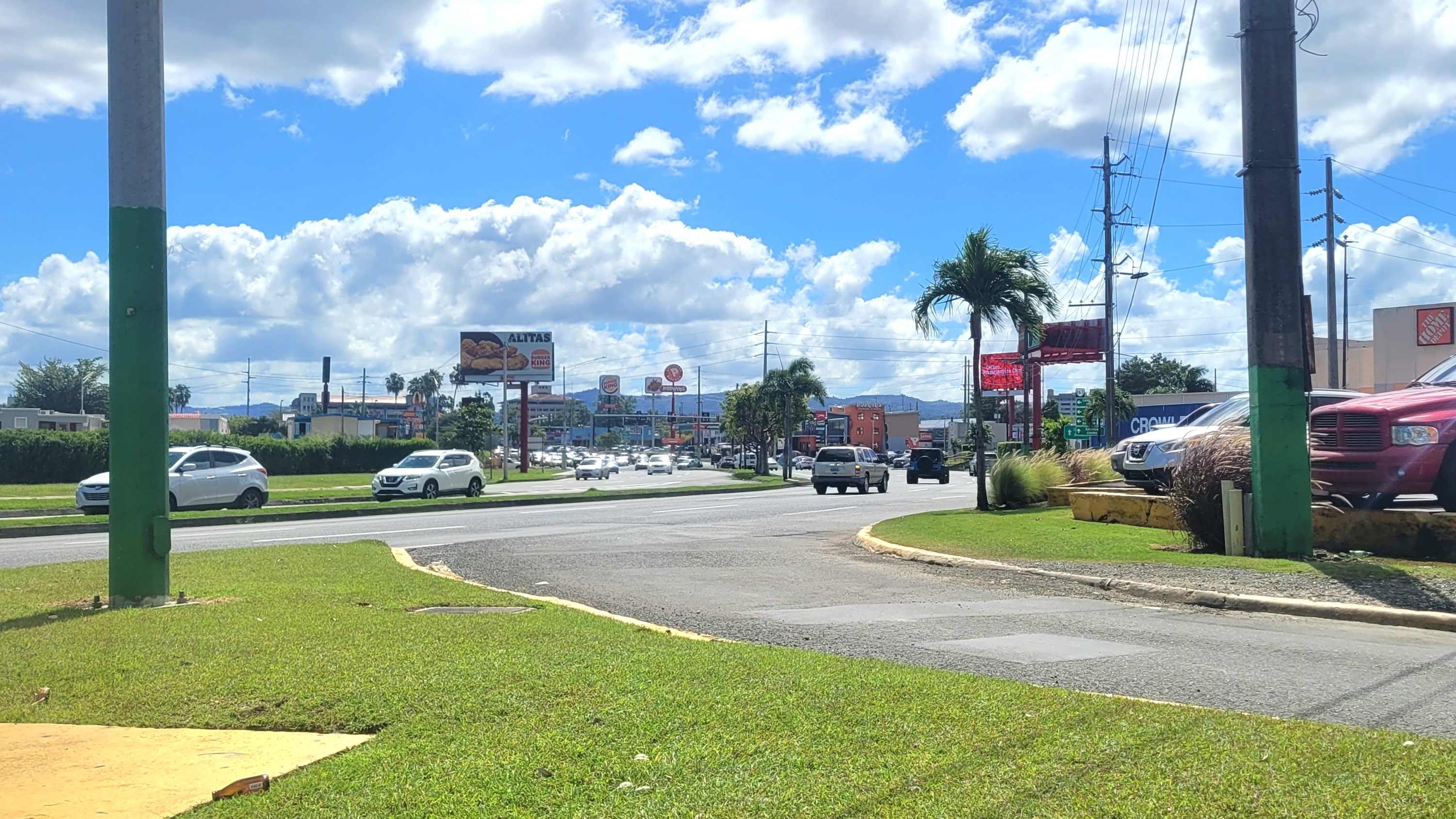
PR-167 south approaching PR-29 junction in Hato Tejas, Bayamón

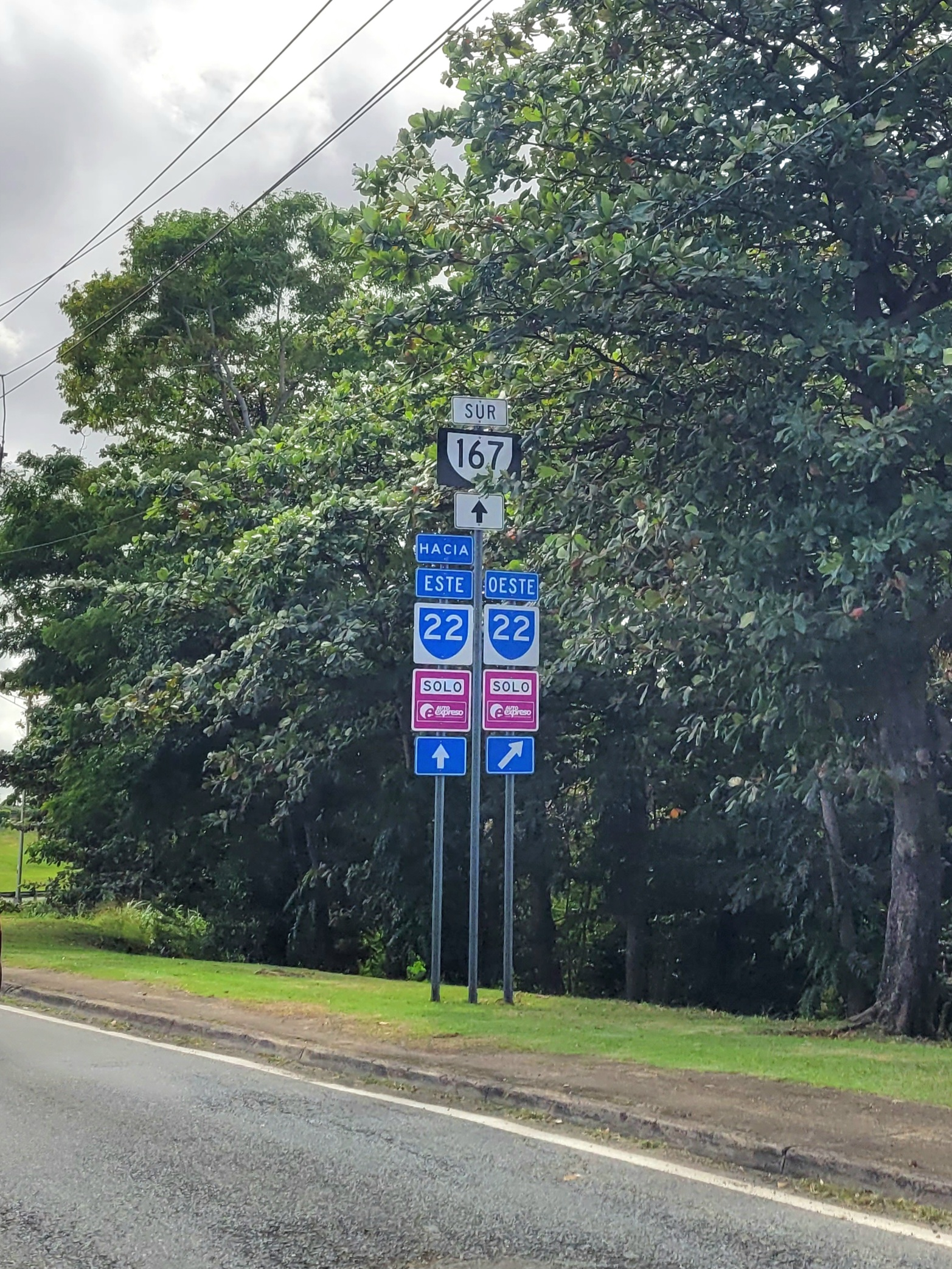
PR-167 south at PR-22 junction in Río Hondo, Bayamón

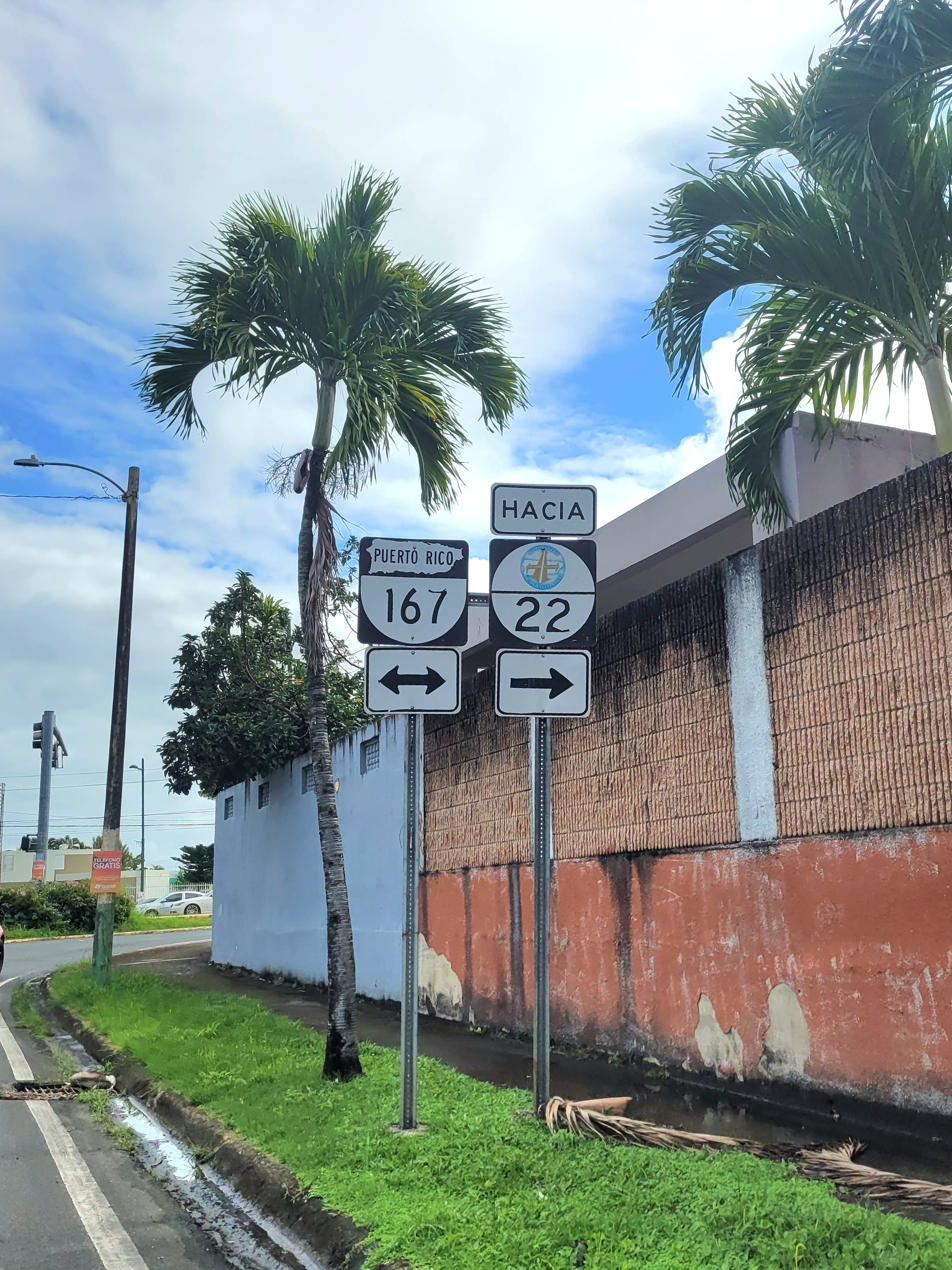
Signs for PR-22 and PR-167 in Levittown, Toa Baja

Municipality	Location	km	mi	Destinations	Notes
Comerío	Doña Elena	0.0	0.0	PR-156 / PR-7167 – Comerío, Aguas Buenas	Southern terminus of PR-167
Comerío	Doña Elena	1.9	1.2	PR-780 – Doña Elena	
Naranjito	Nuevo	5.3– 5.4	3.3– 3.4	PR-167 Spur – Los Martínez	
Naranjito	Nuevo	8.5	5.3	PR-148 north / PR-164 to PR-5 (Desvío Mariano Cotto) / PR-826 / PR-8126 – Naranjito, Bayamón, Guadiana	
Río de la Plata		8.5– 8.6	5.3– 5.3	Puente Plata	
Bayamón	Dajaos	8.9	5.5	PR-816 – Nuevo	
Bayamón	Dajaos	10.1	6.3	PR-812 – Dajaos	
Toa Alta	Ortíz	12.5	7.8	PR-827 – Ortíz	
Bayamón	Buena Vista	13.5	8.4	PR-828 (Avenida Los Palacios) to PR-5 (Desvío Mariano Cotto) – Naranjito, Ortíz	
Toa Alta	No major junctions				
Bayamón	Buena Vista	14.3	8.9	PR-829 (Carretera Luis Mercado Cotto) – Ortíz	Western terminus of PR-829 concurrency
Bayamón	Buena Vista	14.4	8.9	PR-829 (Carretera Luis Mercado Cotto) – Buena Vista	Eastern terminus of PR-829 concurrency
Bayamón	Buena Vista	15.4	9.6	PR-830 (Avenida Doctor John William Harris) – Cerro Gordo	
Bayamón	Pájaros	17.3	10.7	PR-199 (Avenida Las Cumbres) – Toa Alta, San Juan	
Bayamón	Pájaros	19.2	11.9	PR-840 (Camino Aldea) – Aldea	
Bayamón	Cerro Gordo	20.1	12.5	PR-Avenida Magnolia – Bayamón	
Bayamón	Cerro Gordo	21.6	13.4	PR-Avenida Doctor Ramón Luis Rodríguez – Bayamón	
Bayamón	Bayamón barrio-pueblo	22.2	13.8	PR-2 – Guaynabo, Arecibo	
Bayamón	Bayamón barrio-pueblo	22.4– 22.5	13.9– 14.0	PR-855 (Calle Doctor Santiago Veve) – Bayamón	One-way street; westbound access via Calle Ramón Emeterio Betances
Bayamón	Hato Tejas	22.8	14.2	PR-8855 (Avenida Bobby Capó) – Bayamón	
Bayamón	Hato Tejas	23.2	14.4	PR-29 (Avenida Main Oeste) – Bayamón	
Bayamón	Hato Tejas	25.1	15.6	PR-22 (Autopista José de Diego) – Cataño, Guaynabo, San Juan, Dorado, Arecibo, Mayagüez	PR-22 exit 13; diamond interchange
Cataño	No major junctions				
Toa Baja	Sabana Seca	26.9– 27.0	16.7– 16.8	PR-Avenida Juan "Picolino" Hernández Ferrer – Toa Baja	
Toa Baja	Sabana Seca	27.8– 27.9	17.3– 17.3	PR-866 (Avenida Boulevard) – Levittown	
Toa Baja	Sabana Seca	28.4	17.6	PR-165 (Avenida El Caño) – Cataño, Dorado	Northern terminus of PR-167
1.000 mi = 1.609 km; 1.000 km = 0.621 mi: Concurrency terminus; Incomplete access

== In popular culture ==
Puerto Rican rapper and singer Farruko's seventh studio album, La 167, is named after PR-167. Puerto Rico Highway 167 runs near Bayamón, where Farruko grew up.

== See also ==
- 1953 Puerto Rico highway renumbering
