= List of barrios and sectors of Toa Baja, Puerto Rico =

Like all municipalities of Puerto Rico, Toa Baja is subdivided into administrative units called barrios, which are, in contemporary times, roughly comparable to minor civil divisions, (and means wards or boroughs or neighborhoods in English). The barrios and subbarrios, in turn, are further subdivided into smaller local populated place areas/units called sectores (sectors in English). The types of sectores may vary, from normally sector to urbanización to reparto to barriada to residencial, among others. Some sectors appear in two barrios.

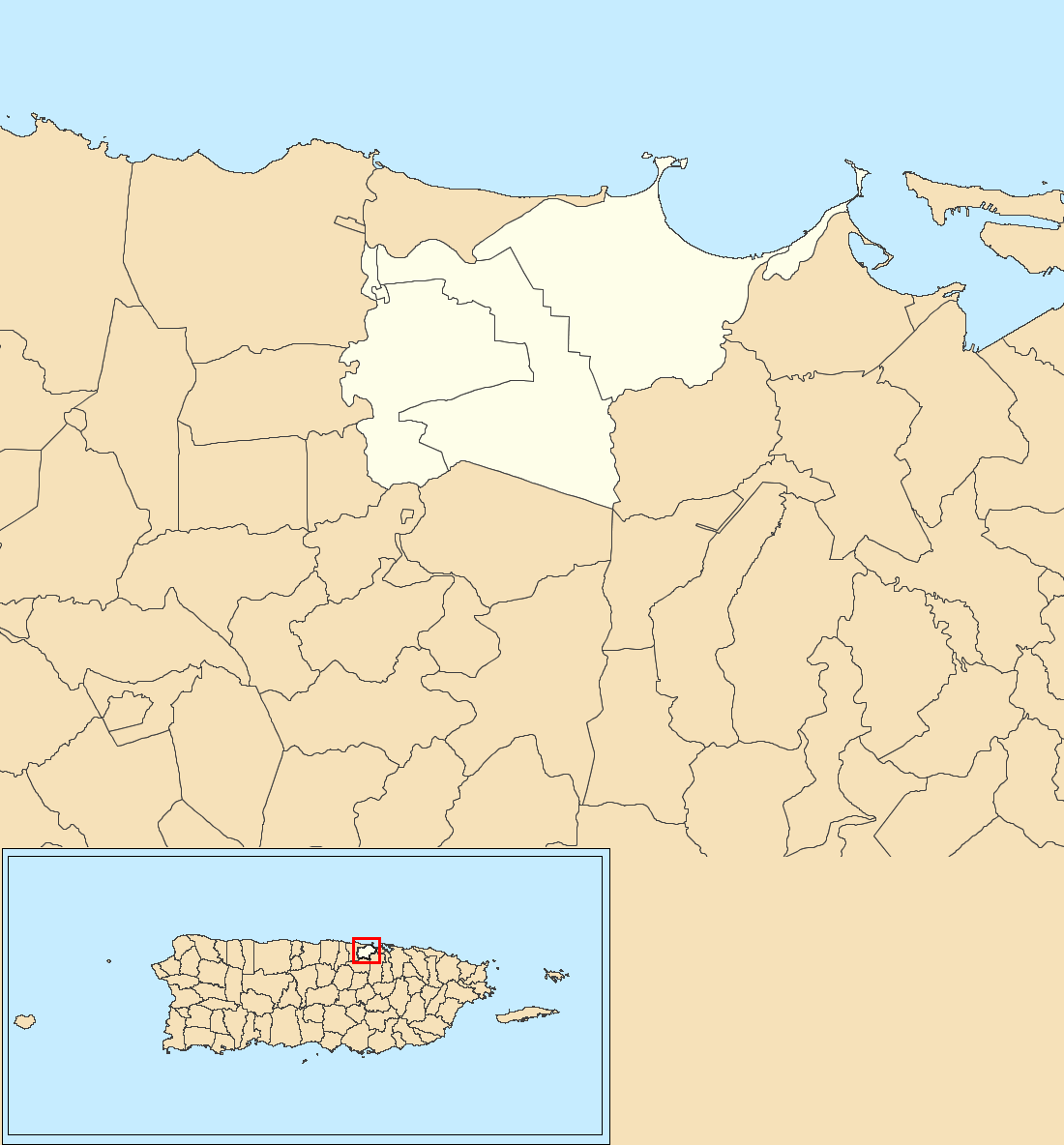
Toa Baja map with barrio subdivisions

== List of sectors by barrio ==
=== Candelaria ===
- Barriada Fidel Torres
- Barriada Márquez
- Barriada Popular
- Barriada Aponte
- Comunidad Candelaria Arenas
- Comunidad Pájaros
- Comunidad Villa Pangola
- Condominio Quinta Real
- Condominio Terrazas de Montecasino
- Proyecto Pájaros
- Reparto Anamar
- Reparto Molina
- Sector Albizu
- Sector Alto El Cabro
- Sector Azucena
- Sector Barriada Rosa
- Sector Buen Vecino
- Sector Capitán
- Sector Dos Abras
- Sector El Guayabal
- Sector Fondo El Saco
- Sector Gutiérrez
- Sector Hoyo Frío
- Sector Juan Chiquito
- Sector La Prá I y II
- Sector Los Díaz
- Sector Los Jiménez
- Sector Macún
- Sector Monte Bello I y II
- Sector Monte Bello
- Sector Paco Dávila
- Sector Villa Clemente
- Sector Villa Dávila
- Sector Villa Gutiérrez
- Sector Villa Kennedy
- Sector Villa Olga
- Tramo Carretera 2
- Ubanización Las Colinas
- Urbanización Altagracia
- Urbanización Altura de Hacienda Dorada
- Urbanización Alturas de Covadonga
- Urbanización Brisas de Montecasino
- Urbanización Covadonga
- Urbanización El Plantío
- Urbanización El Rosario
- Urbanización Estancias de la Fuente (Fuente Imperial, Fuente Condado y Fuente del Valle)
- Urbanización Fuente Royal
- Urbanización Fuentebella
- Urbanización Haciendas del Norte
- Urbanización Mansiones Montecasino I y II
- Urbanización Quintas del Norte
- Urbanización San Pedro
- Urbanización San Rafael Estate
- Urbanización Santa María
- Urbanización y Extensión La Inmaculada

=== Media Luna ===
- Brisas del Campanero II
- Comunidad Las Master
- Residencial Campanilla
- Sector Campanilla
- Sector La Vega
- Sector Los Quintero
- Sector Media Luna
- Sector Parcelas Nuevas
- Sector San José
- Sector Valle Seco
- Sector Villa Esperanza
- Sector Villa Hostos
- Urbanización Brisas del Campanero
- Urbanización Riberas del Plata (Las 21)

=== Palo Seco ===
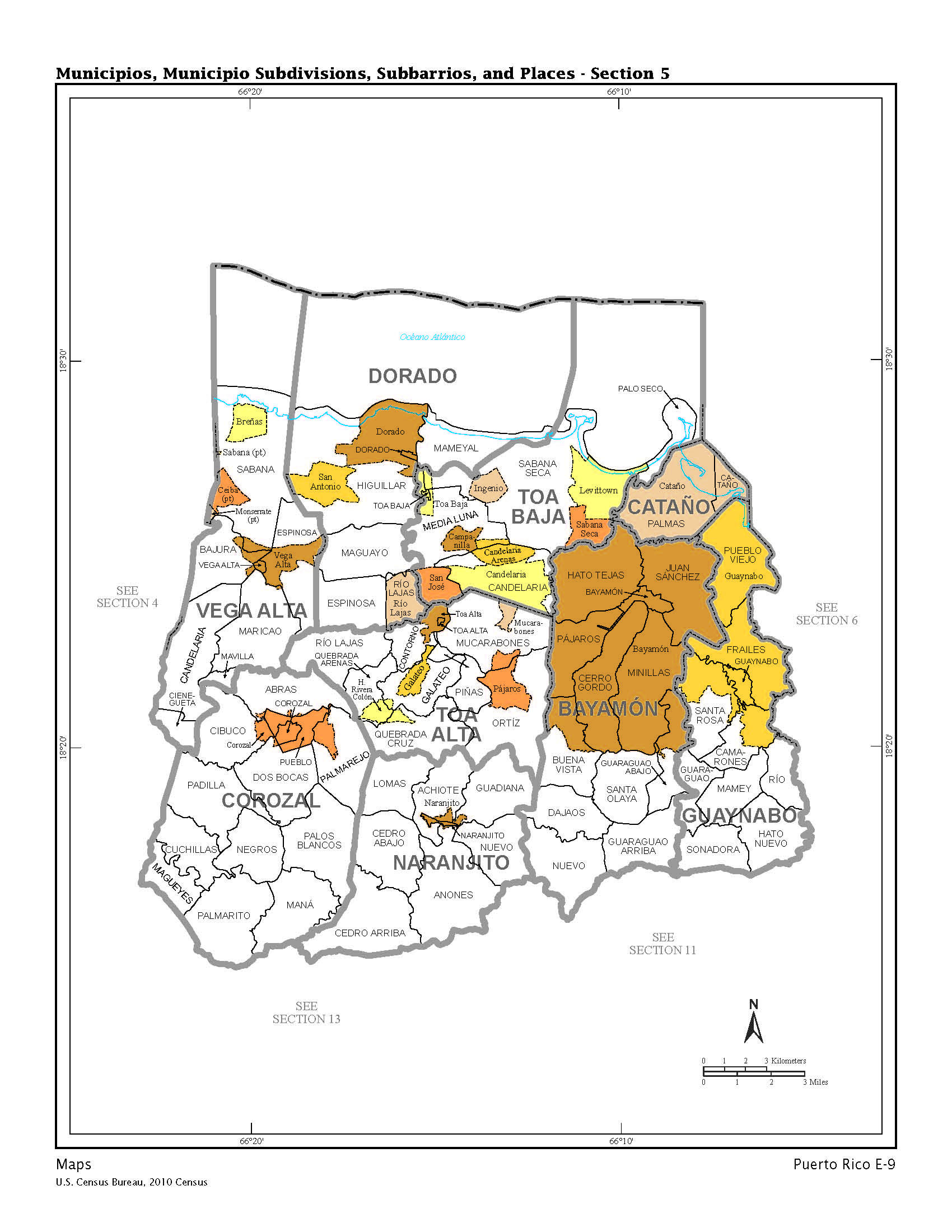
US Census map of Toa Alta, and Toa Baja showing Palo Seco (point)

There are no sectors in Palo Seco barrio.

=== Sabana Seca ===
- Calle Parcelas Nuevas
- Calles: Las Marías, Sarón, Parque Oeste, Parque Norte, Parque Sur, Links, 5A, J. Link, Acueducto, Algarrobo, Higüero, La Milagrosa (Culto), León de Oro, Vargas, Bella Vista, Rejas, -F-, Progreso, Las Palmas, Iglesia Cristiana, Luz, Dolores Cruz, Vieja, Gardenia, Meléndez, Amapola
- Comunidad Villa Kennedy
- Comunidad Villa Marisol
- Condominio Aquaparque
- Condominio Century Garden
- Condominio El Atlántico
- Condominio Lago Vista I y II
- Condominio Lagoplaya
- Condominio Lagos del Norte
- Condominio Parque de Las Gaviotas
- Condominio Parque del Lago
- Condominio Paseo Abril
- Condominio Paseo Río Hondo
- Cuarta Sección de Levittown
- Égida Golden Age Tower
- Parcelas Viejas
- Primera Sección de Levittown
- Quinta Sección de Levittown
- Residencial Villa del Sabana
- Sección Quinta A de Levittown
- Sector Calle Iglesia Cristiana
- Sector Camasey
- Sector Campamento
- Sector Cuatro Cuerdas
- Sector El 26
- Sector Ingenio
- Sector La Franja
- Sector La Furnia
- Sector La Vega
- Sector Los Bravos
- Sector Los Magos
- Sector Monserrate
- Sector Propiedad Privada
- Sector Punta Salinas
- Sector Sabana Seca
- Sector Villa Calma
- Sector Villa Plebiscito
- Segunda Sección de Levittown
- Séptima Sección de Levittown
- Sexta Sección de Levittown
- Tercera Sección de Levittown
- Urbanización Camino del Mar
- Urbanización Campanilla
- Urbanización El Naranjal
- Urbanización Las Gaviotas
- Urbanización Levittville
- Urbanización Mansión del Mar
- Urbanización Mansión del Sol
- Urbanización Mansiones del Lago
- Urbanización Oasis
- Urbanización Pabellones
- Urbanización Pradera del Norte
- Urbanización Punta Salinas Park
- Urbanización Rosaleda I
- Urbanización Rosaleda II
- Urbanización Villas de Levittown
- Urbanización Villas del Naranjal
- Urbanización y Extensión Lagos de Plata

=== Toa Baja barrio-pueblo ===
- Residencial Ángel E. Melecio
- Residencial El Toa
- Urbanización Rochdale
- Urbanización San Pedro
- Urbanización Toa Ville

== See also ==
- List of communities in Puerto Rico
