= Levittown, Puerto Rico =

Suburb of San Juan, Puerto Rico

Levittown
- Unincorporated community
- Bridge on Puerto Rico Highway 165 leaving Levittown

- Location within Puerto Rico
- Coordinates: 18°26′55″N 66°10′49″W
- Commonwealth: Puerto Rico

Area
  - Total: 6.6 km^{2} (2.53 sq mi)
  - Land: 5.9 km^{2} (2.27 sq mi)
  - Water: 0.67 km^{2} (0.26 sq mi)
- Elevation: 1.5 m (5 ft)

Population (2020)
  - Total: 25,591
  - Density: 4,350/km^{2} (11,300/sq mi)
- Time zone: UTC-4 (Atlantic (AST))
- Postal code: 00949
- Area code: 787
- FIPS code: 7250260
- GNIS feature ID: 2414861

Levittown, a suburb in the municipality of Toa Baja, is a planned community, among the largest in Puerto Rico. Per the 2020 census, the population was 25,591. It is divided into eight sections called secciones and several sub-divisions called urbanizaciones. Levittown is known for its 150 foot tall sky blue water tower (now converted into a public library) that was one of the first water towers in Puerto Rico used to provide potable water to residences.

== Geography ==
Levittown is located in the municipalities of Toa Baja and Bayamon (8th Section now known as Fronteras de Bayamon). To the west sits Levittown Lakes or Los Lagos de Levittown, a small man-made lake formed by draining the marshland over which Levittown was built. The drainage canal that feeds the lake is called Caño El Hato, which extends into the center of Levittown. To the east, the Bayamon River divides Levittown from the fishing village of Palo Seco, next to the Cataño municipality. To the north, Highway 165 runs along the coastline, but it has not a single official pedestrian crossing for its entire length west of the Rio Hondo, greatly impeding access to the local beaches from the residential areas.

Levittown's main avenue is known as "Bulevar de Levittown". Los Dominicos Avenue is the second main avenue and connects Levittown to other areas, including Sabana Seca sector and the city of Bayamón. Levittown has more than three shopping centers, including Plaza Davison and Rio Hondo Mall. Highway 165 connects Levittown with the towns of Toa Baja, Cataño and Dorado, Puerto Rico. Punta Salinas' radar domes and El Morro can be seen from this route. At night, El Morro lighthouse and the Palo Seco power plant are visible. The coastal area along the road near the Bayamon River is popular with local surfers and is known as Cochino Beach (Pigs Beach), probably because of the brownish waters caused by the sediments flowing out from the river.

Punta Salinas, the public beach, is home to a Puerto Rico Air National Guard unit, the 140 ADS, that provides air traffic control support to the FAA, military and law enforcement operations. It is also the home of a Civil Air Patrol squadron, one of several in the municipality of Toa Baja.

Levittown has tropical weather all year round. The 150' water tower, also known by pilots as the Levittown Water Tank, provides a visual navigational checkpoint to aircraft flying either to Isla Grande Airport or to Luis Muñoz Marín International Airport. The area around Lago De Plata suffered some flood damages due to the rising water levels during Hurricane Maria.

== History ==
Levittown was developed by Levitt & Sons in 1963. It has a Blue Flag-rated public beach known as Punta Salinas and also one of the bigger public sports centers of the metropolitan area of San Juan with tennis courts and a stadium for track and field meets. Its Olympic-sized pool has been in use since its construction in 1977. Its high school, Dr. Pedro Albizu Campos High School, was built in 1970 and is named after an important political figure on the island. The school's football team, the Levittown Spartans, have been among the top high school football teams on the island. In 1975 they became the co-champions along with the Pirates from Antilles High School, in Fort Buchanan. Also, the Spartans track teams, coached by Wilfredo Meaux (who would later on coach the team from University of Puerto Rico at Bayamon) were perennial powers during the 1970s and 80s. Levittown High's Basketball team has produced several excellent players including Ramon Rivas, who played for the NBA with the Boston Celtics. In 2018, the Levittown baseball team was the world champion of the first ever Colt World Series Championship, beating the Seoul, South Korea team 5-4.

== Transportation ==
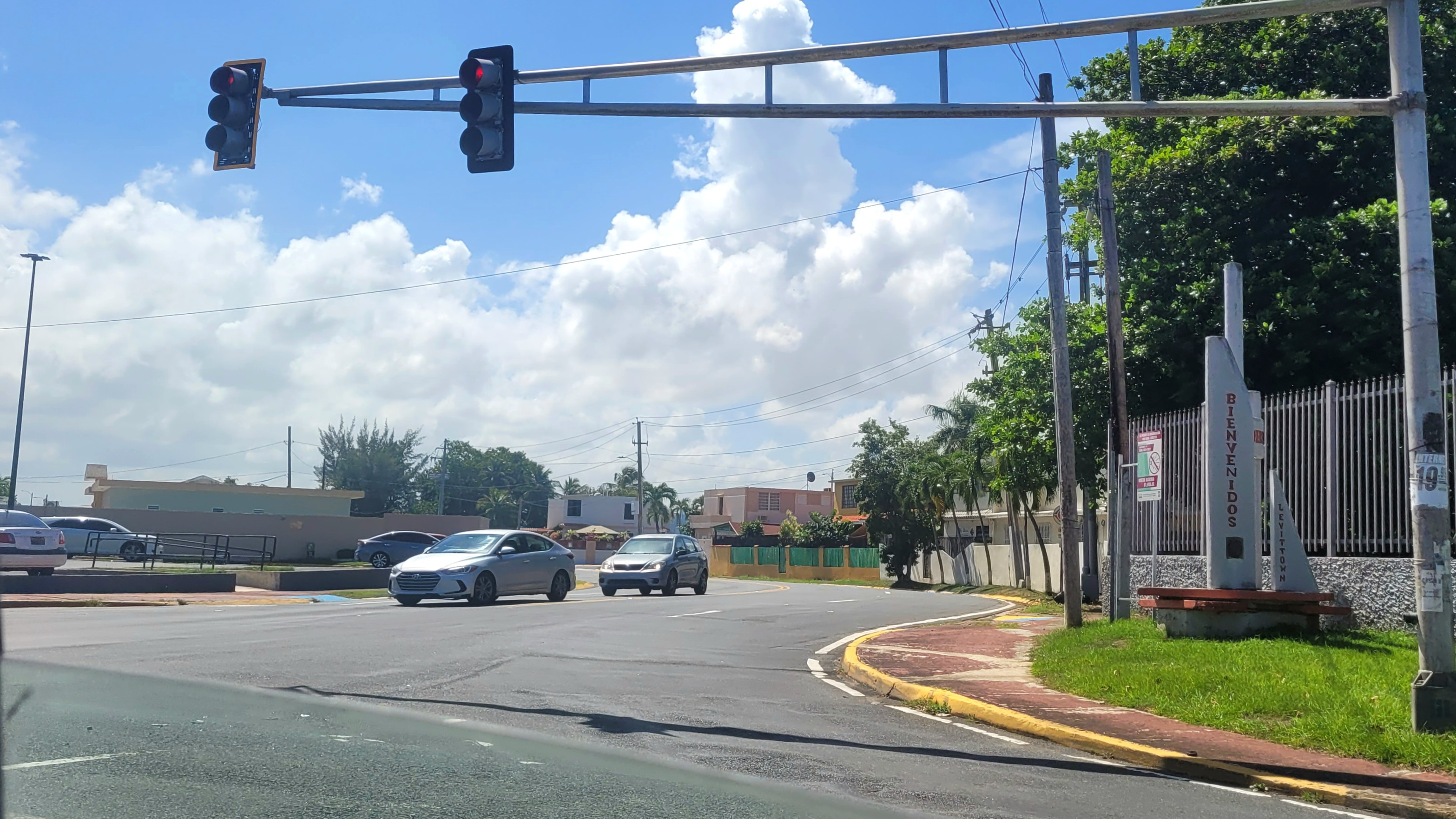
Avenida Boulevard in Levittown

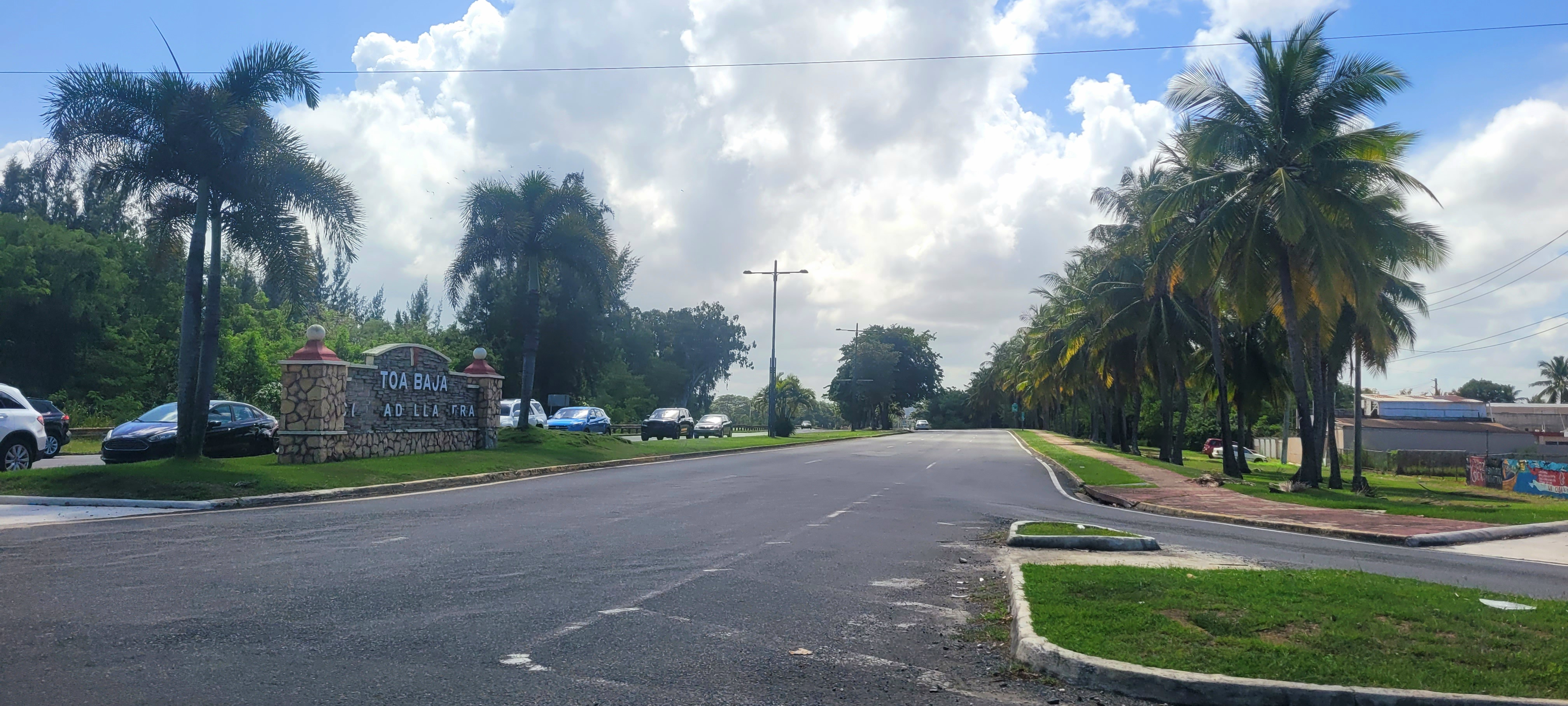
Puerto Rico Highway 167 in Levittown

It is served by Route D37 of the Puerto Rico Metropolitan Bus Authority and private commuter buses connecting the community with Cataño and the Tren Urbano Rapid Transit station in Bayamon. The neighborhood is patrolled by the Toa Baja Municipal Police Department with a precinct in the western part of the neighborhood, and the 271st precinct of the Puerto Rico Police Department located behind the water tank and the high school.

== Demographics ==
Historical population
Census	Pop.	Note	%±
2010	26,960		—
2020	25,591		−5.1%
U.S. Decennial Census; 2010 2020

Prior to the 2020 U.S. census, the United States Census Bureau changed the name of the community from Levittown to Mansión del Mar.

=== 2020 census ===
Mansión del Mar comunidad, Puerto Rico – Demographic Profile (NH = Non-Hispanic)
Race / Ethnicity	Pop 2010	Pop 2020	% 2010	% 2020
White alone (NH)	251	158	0.93%	0.62%
Black or African American alone (NH)	50	73	0.19%	0.17%
Native American or Alaska Native alone (NH)	2	0	0.01%	0.00%
Asian alone (NH)	61	40	0.23%	0.16%
Pacific Islander alone (NH)	0	0	0.00%	0.00%
Some Other Race alone (NH)	7	10	0.03%	0.04%
Mixed Race/Multi-Racial (NH)	12	15	0.04%	0.06%
Hispanic or Latino (any race)	26,577	25,325	98.58%	98.96%
Total	26,960	25,591	100.00%	100.00%

Note: the US Census treats Hispanic/Latino as an ethnic category. This table excludes Latinos from the racial categories and assigns them to a separate category. Hispanics/Latinos can be of any race.

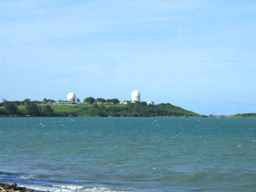
Punta Salinas as seen from Levittown

=== 2010 Census ===
As of the census of 2010, there were 26,960 people living in the community. The average family size was of 3.09. The population density was 13,279/mi^{2}. There were 11,701 housing units. The racial makeup of the area was 73.9% White, 13.7% African American, 7.7% from other races, and 3.7% from two or more races. The majority (98.6%) were of Hispanic ethnicity. Of those, 93.5% were Puerto Rican, 0.5% Cuban, 0.3% Mexican and 4.4% of other Hispanic ethnicity.

In the community the population was 53.5% females and 46.5% males. The median age of the population was 38.4 years. The mean income for a family in the community for 2010 was $36,605. 24.2% of families were below the federal poverty level.

== Notable people ==
- Justo Betancourt - salsa musician, lived in Levittown
- Oscar Cartaya - bass player for Spyro Gyra
- Kany García - singer, songwriter, and musician
- José Huertas "Invader #1" - Professional wrestler
- Sixto Lezcano - Major League Baseball player
- Ray Reyes - Singer and ex-Menudo, raised in Levittown
- Ramón Rivas - NBA Basketball Player, grew up in Levittown
- Jerry Rivera - Salsa musician, raised in Levittown and Sabana Seca
- Edwin "Chapo" Rosario - former World Boxing Champion
- Julita Ross - National Folk Ballad singer, aka "La Dama de la Danza"
- Olga Tañón - Merengue & Latin pop singer

== Gallery ==
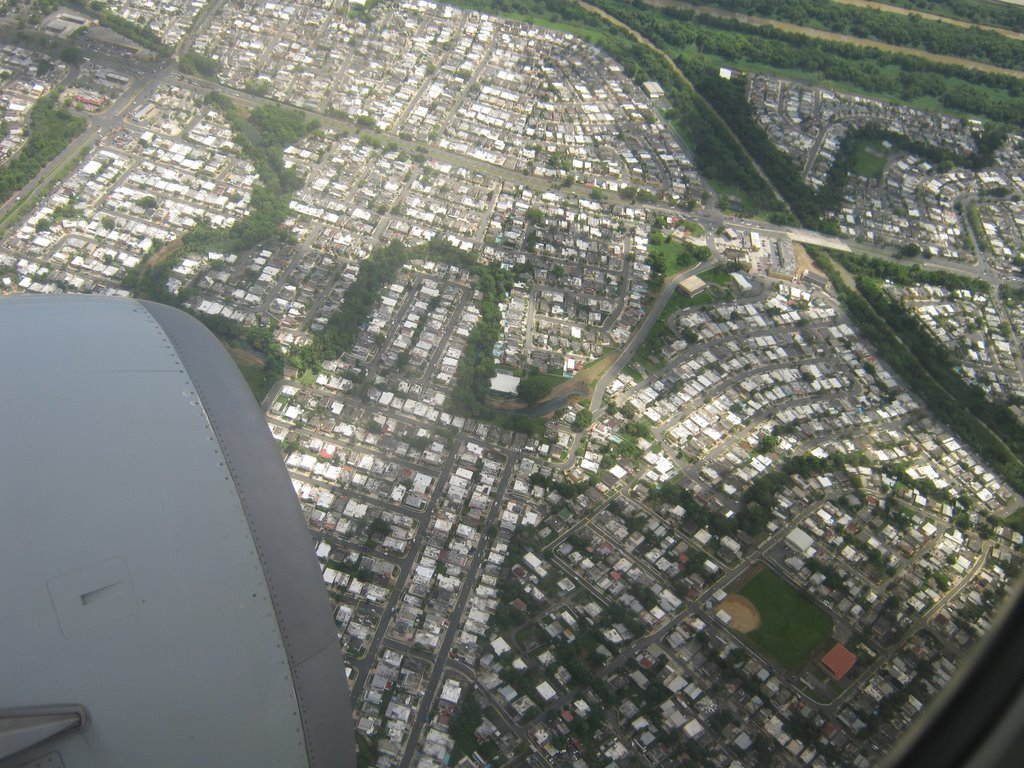

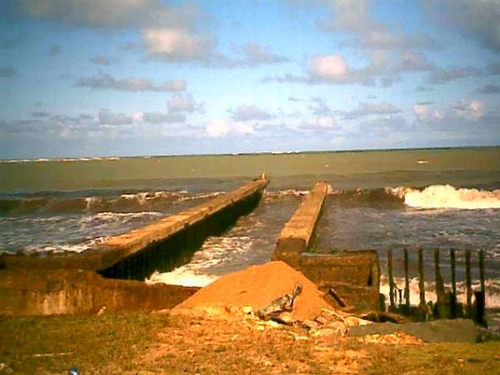
Pier at Cochino Beach

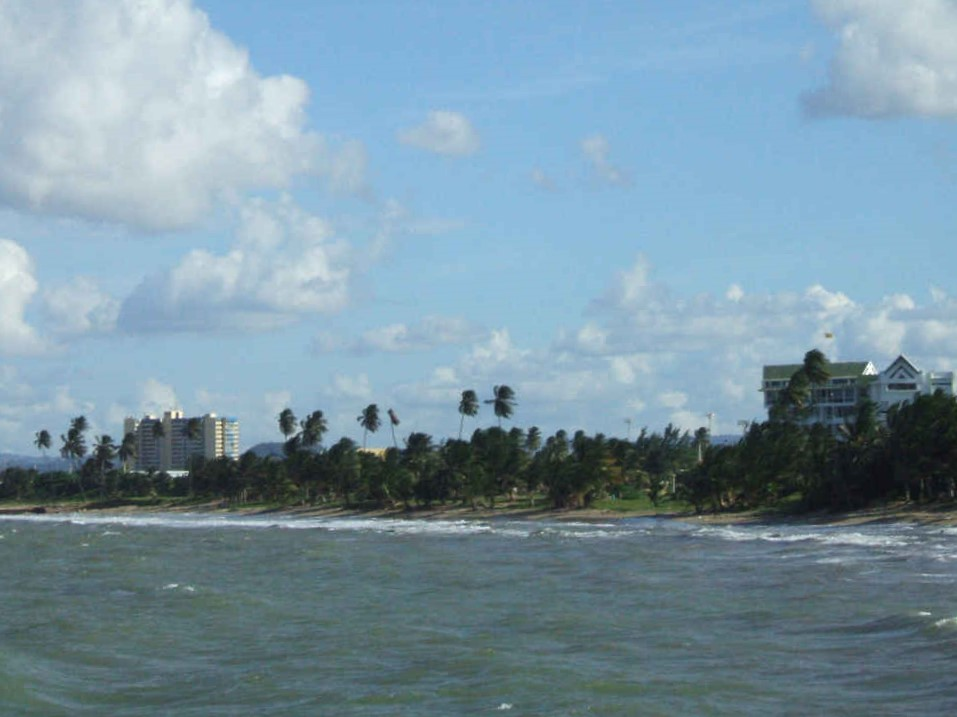
View of the Levittown Comfort Inn Hotel (right)

== See also ==
- List of communities in Puerto Rico
- List of barrios and sectors of Toa Baja, Puerto Rico
