= Buena Vista, Bayamón, Puerto Rico =

Barrio of Puerto Rico

Buena Vista
- Barrio
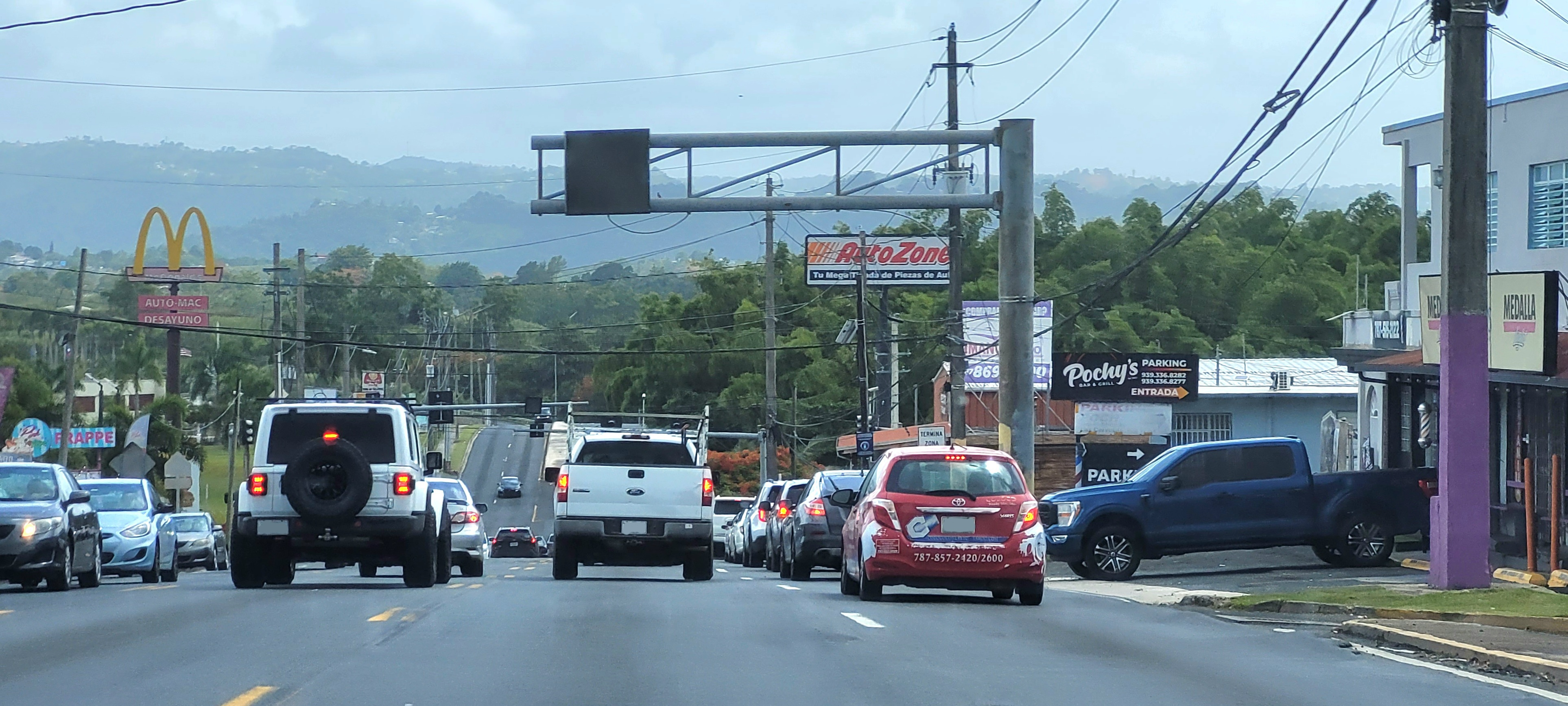
- Puerto Rico Highway 167 in Buena Vista

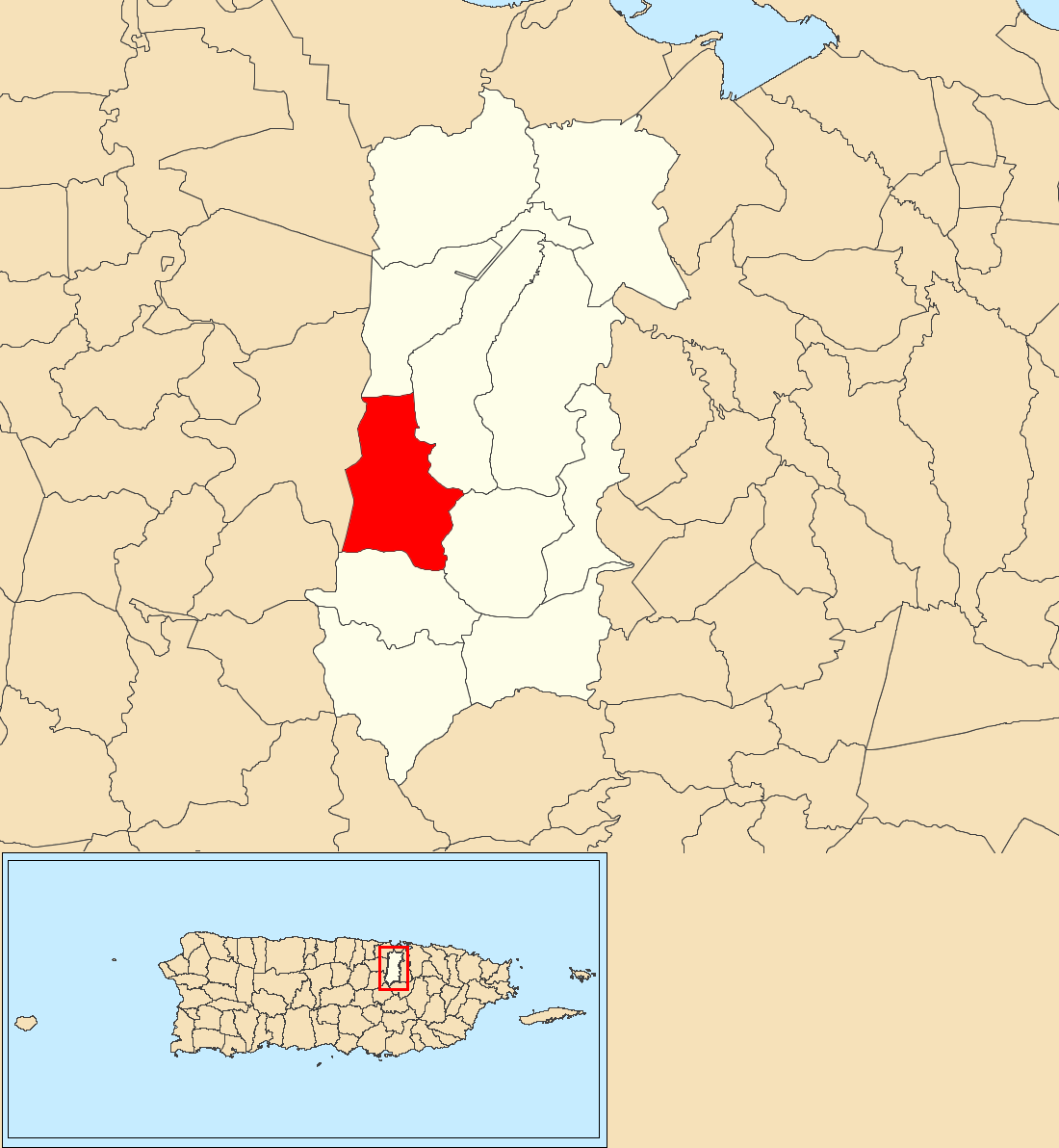
- Location of Buena Vista within the municipality of Bayamón shown in red

- Location of Puerto Rico
- Coordinates: 18°19′59″N 66°11′30″W
- Commonwealth: Puerto Rico
- Municipality: Bayamón

Area
  - Total: 3.62 sq mi (9.4 km^{2})
  - Land: 3.62 sq mi (9.4 km^{2})
  - Water: 0.00 sq mi (0 km^{2})
- Elevation: 423 ft (129 m)

Population (2010)
  - Total: 15,518
  - Density: 1,657.5/sq mi (640.0/km^{2})
- Source: 2010 Census
- Time zone: UTC−4 (AST)

Buena Vista is a barrio in the municipality of Bayamón, Puerto Rico. Its population in 2010 was 15,518.

== History ==
Buena Vista was in Spain's gazetteers until Puerto Rico was ceded by Spain in the aftermath of the Spanish–American War under the terms of the Treaty of Paris of 1898 and became an unincorporated territory of the United States. In 1899, the United States Department of War conducted a census of Puerto Rico finding that the population of Buena Vista barrio was 1,028.

Historical population
Census	Pop.	Note	%±
1900	1,028		—
1910	1,215		18.2%
1920	1,109		−8.7%
1930	1,772		59.8%
1940	2,105		18.8%
1950	3,931		86.7%
1960	4,367		11.1%
1970	0		−100.0%
1980	10,318		—
1990	14,018		35.9%
2000	15,878		13.3%
2010	15,518		−2.3%
U.S. Decennial Census; 1899 (shown as 1900) 1910-1930; 1930-1950 1970(NA) 1980-2000 2010

== See also ==
- List of communities in Puerto Rico
