= Media Luna, Toa Baja, Puerto Rico =

Barrio of Puerto Rico

Media Luna
- Barrio
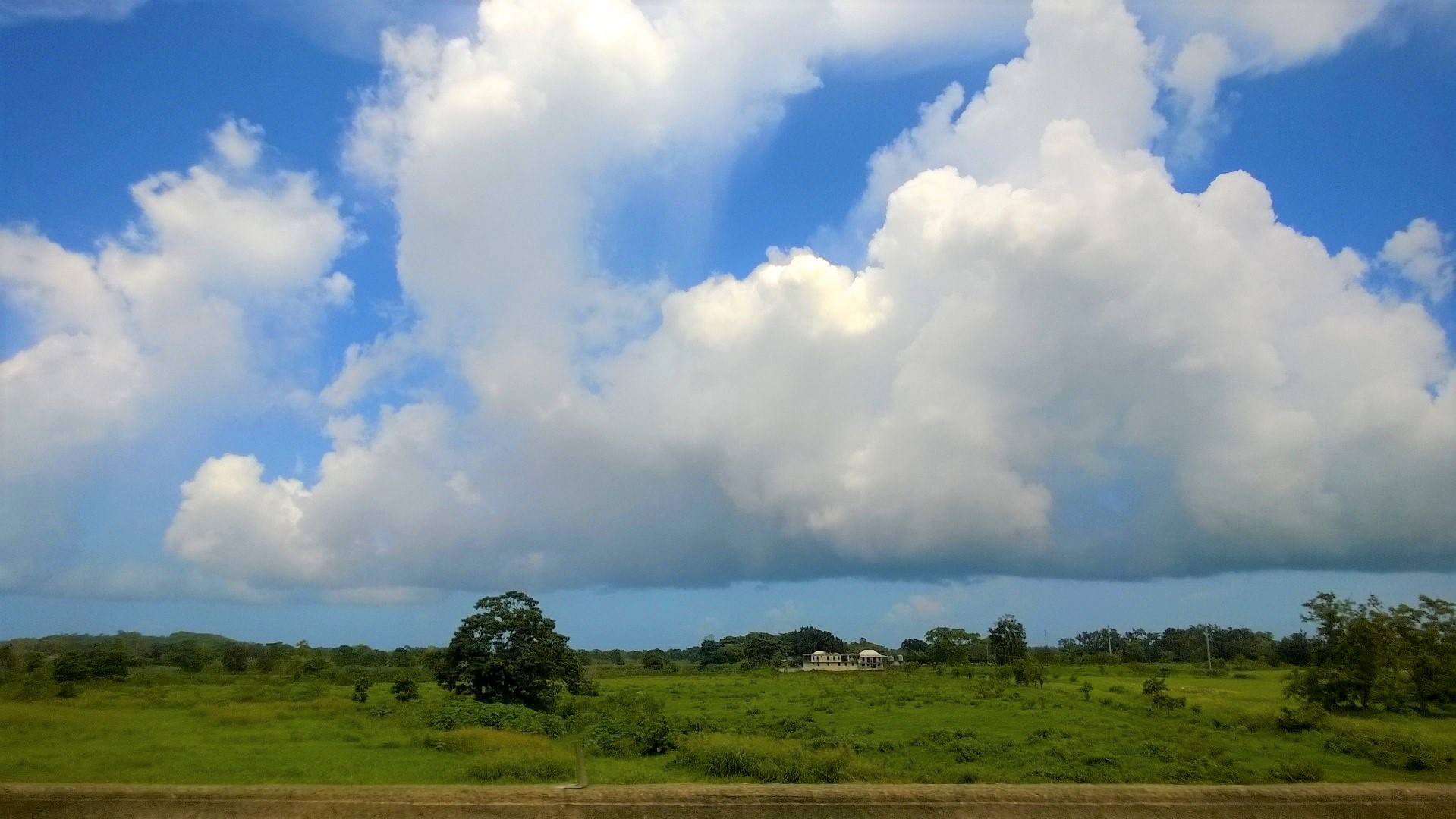
- Flat land in Media Luna

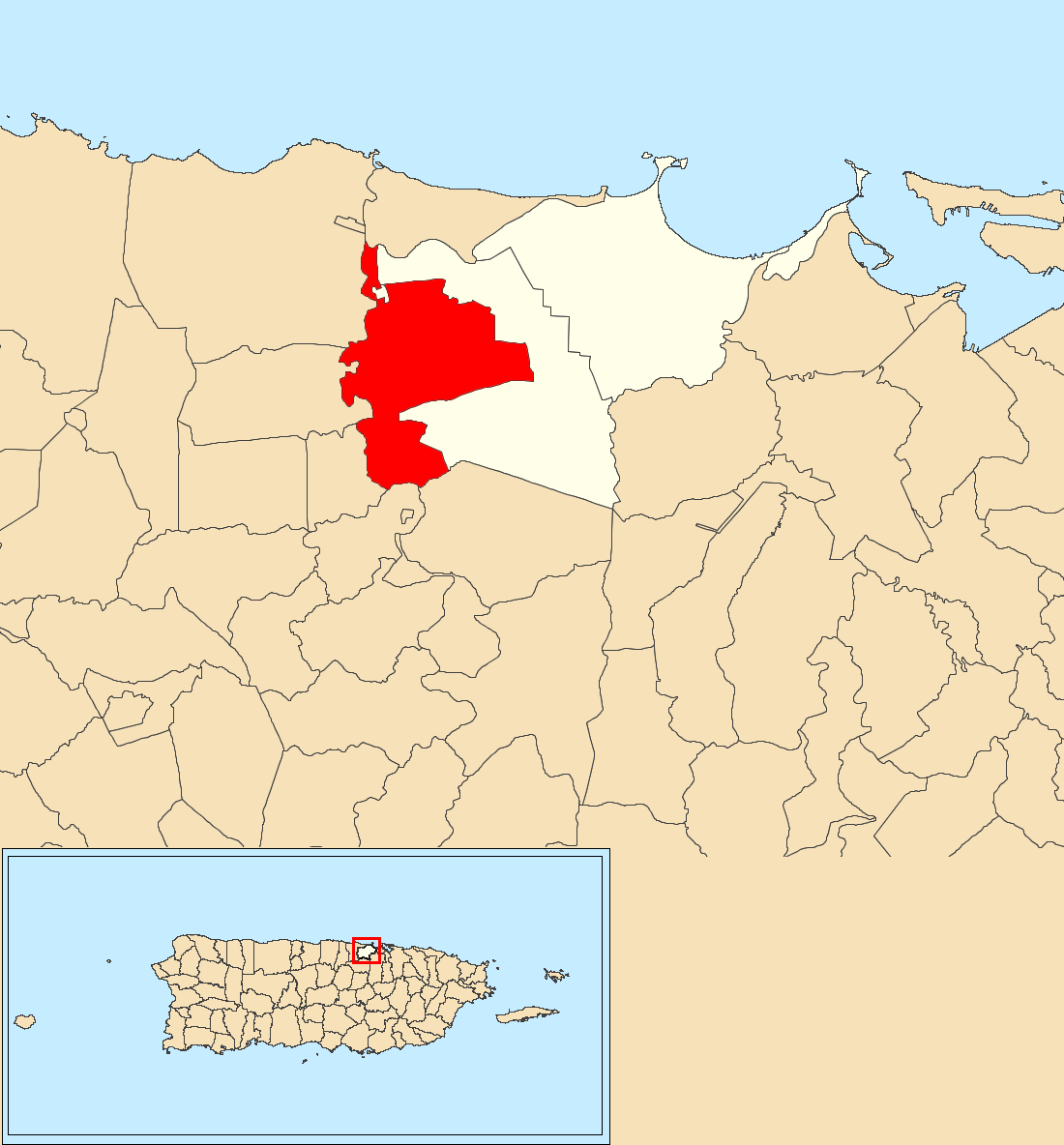
- Location of Media Luna within the municipality of Toa Baja shown in red

- Location of Puerto Rico
- Coordinates: 18°25′27″N 66°14′40″W
- Commonwealth: Puerto Rico
- Municipality: Toa Baja

Area
  - Total: 5.93 sq mi (15.4 km^{2})
  - Land: 5.87 sq mi (15.2 km^{2})
  - Water: 0.06 sq mi (0.16 km^{2})
- Elevation: 26 ft (7.9 m)

Population (2010)
  - Total: 12,221
  - Density: 2,081.9/sq mi (803.8/km^{2})
- Source: 2010 Census
- Time zone: UTC−4 (AST)

Media Luna is a barrio in the municipality of Toa Baja, Puerto Rico. Its population in 2010 was 12,221.

== History ==
Media Luna was in Spain's gazetteers until Puerto Rico was ceded by Spain in the aftermath of the Spanish–American War under the terms of the Treaty of Paris of 1898 and became an unincorporated territory of the United States. In 1899, the United States Department of War conducted a census of Puerto Rico finding that the population of Media Luna barrio was 598.

Historical population
| Census | Pop. | Note | %± |
|---|---|---|---|
| 1900 | 598 | | — |
| 1910 | 910 | | 52.2% |
| 1920 | 1,159 | | 27.4% |
| 1930 | 2,343 | | 102.2% |
| 1940 | 1,366 | | −41.7% |
| 1950 | 2,246 | | 64.4% |
| 1960 | 3,601 | | 60.3% |
| 1970 | 0 | | −100.0% |
| 1980 | 9,255 | | — |
| 1990 | 11,359 | | 22.7% |
| 2000 | 12,712 | | 11.9% |
| 2010 | 12,221 | | −3.9% |
U.S. Decennial Census; 1899 (shown as 1900) 1910-1930; 1930-1950 1980-2000 2010

== Sectors ==
Barrios (which are, in contemporary times, roughly comparable to minor civil divisions) in turn are further subdivided into smaller local populated place areas/units called sectores (sectors in English). The types of sectores may vary, from normally sector to urbanización to reparto to barriada to residencial, among others.

The following sectors are in Media Luna barrio:

Brisas del Campanero II, Comunidad Las Master, Residencial Campanilla, Sector Campanilla, Sector La Vega, Sector Los Quintero, Sector Media Luna, Sector Parcelas Nuevas, Sector San José, Sector Valle Seco, Sector Villa Esperanza, Sector Villa Hostos, Urbanización Brisas del Campanero, and Urbanización Riberas del Plata (Las 21).

== Gallery ==
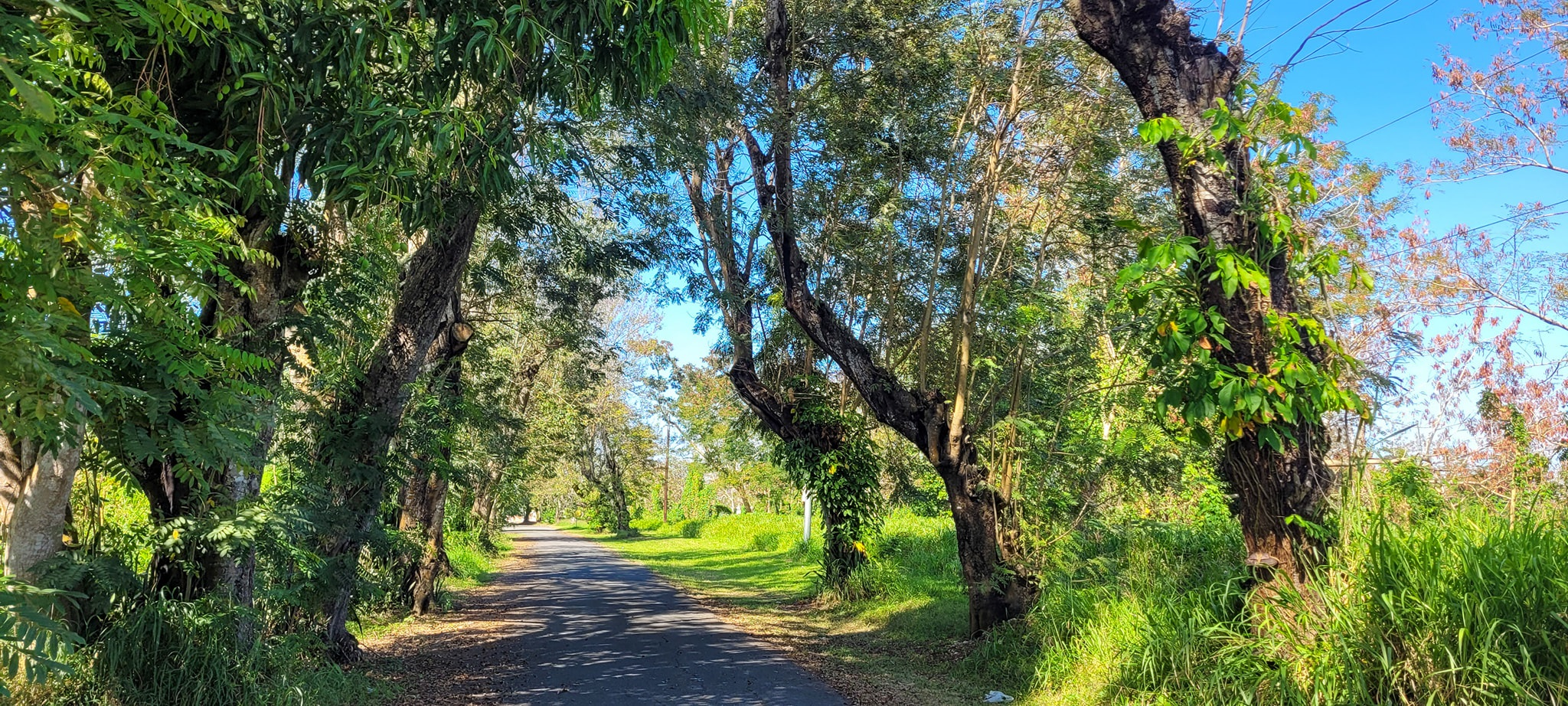
Puerto Rico Highway 854 in Media Luna

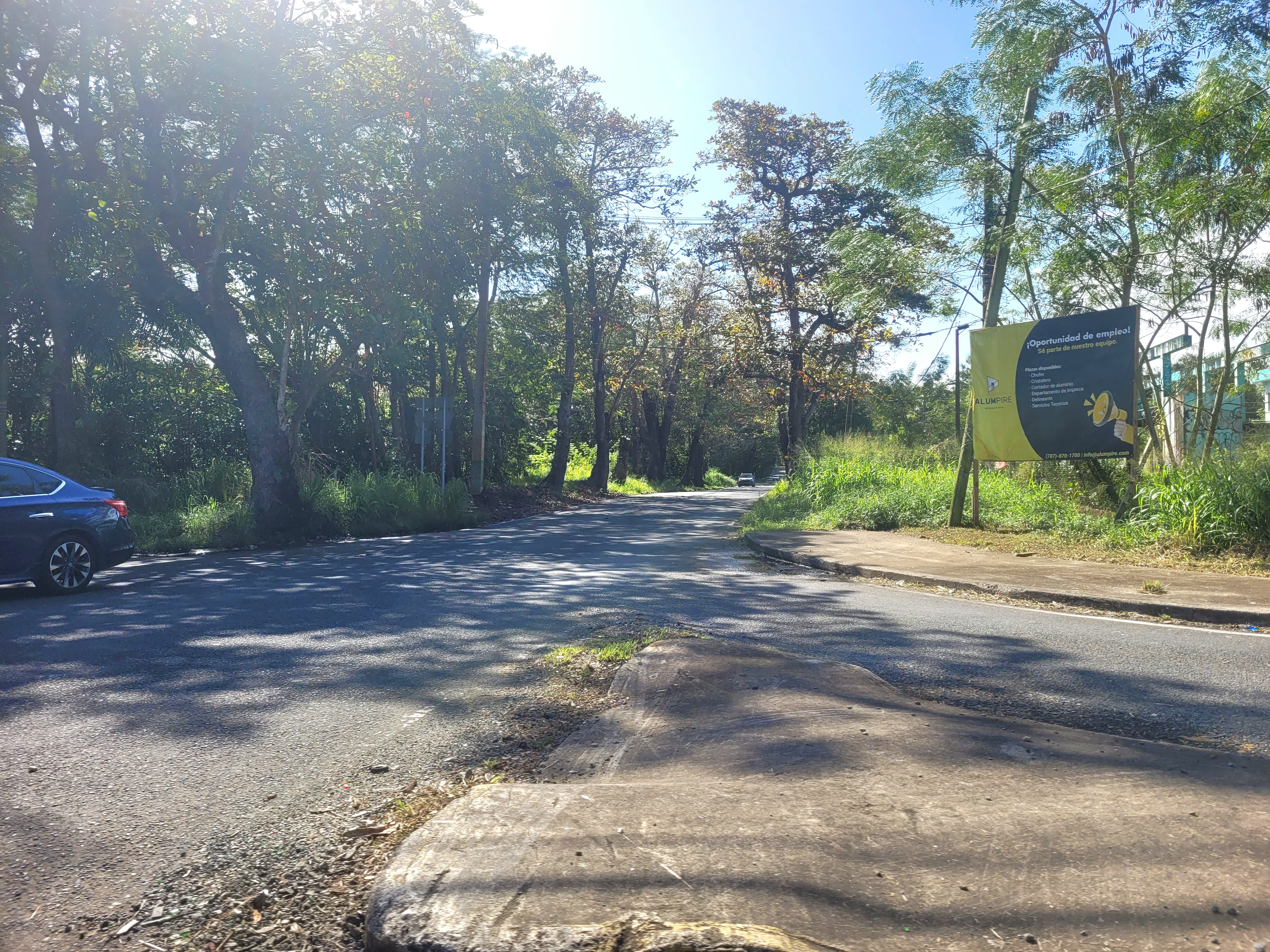
Puerto Rico Highway 8865 in Media Luna

== See also ==
- List of communities in Puerto Rico
- List of barrios and sectors of Toa Baja, Puerto Rico
