= Sabana Seca =

Barrio of Toa Baja, Puerto Rico

- Barrio
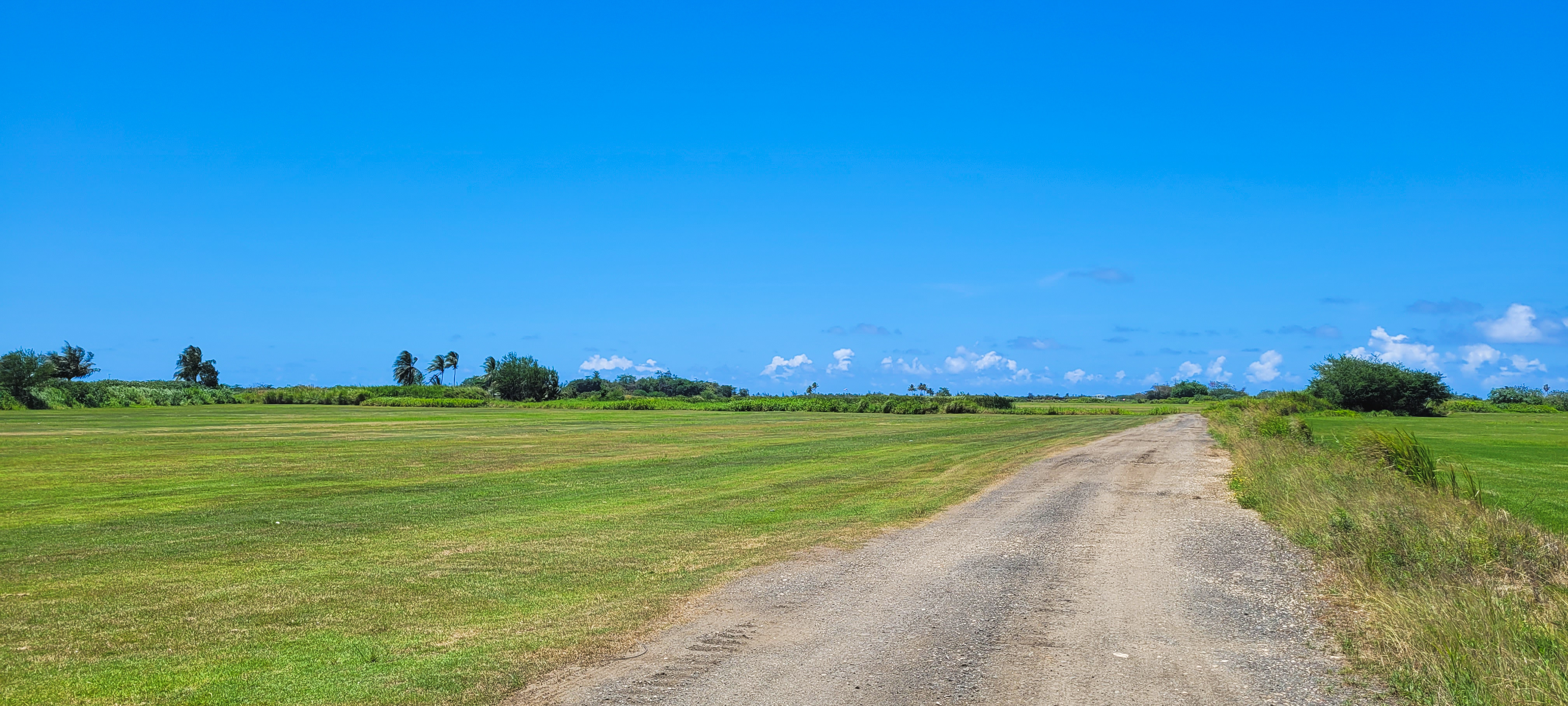
- Flat land in Sabana Seca

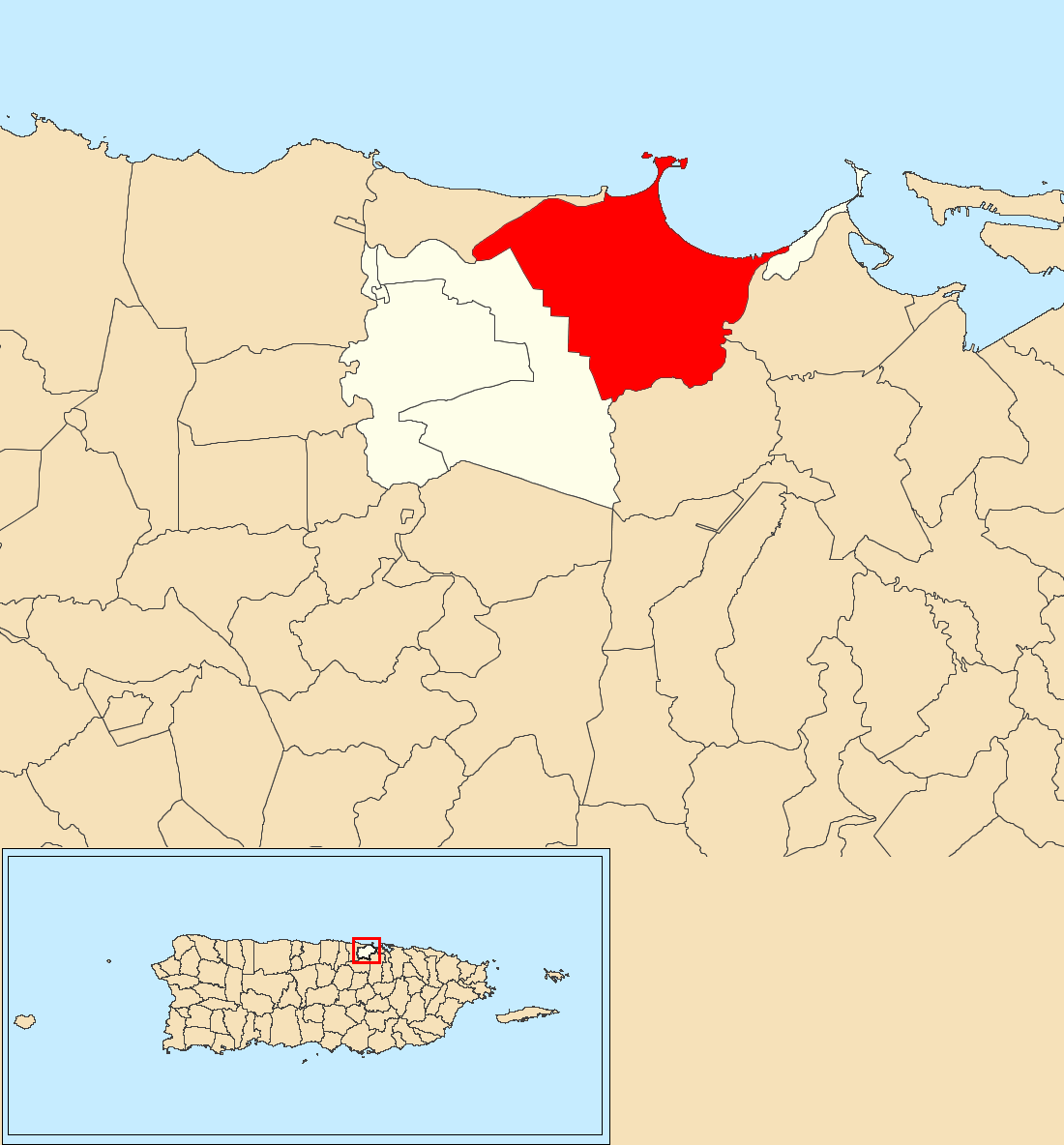
- Location of Sabana Seca within the municipality of Toa Baja shown in red

- Location of Puerto Rico
- Coordinates: 18°26′43″N 66°11′58″W
- Commonwealth: Puerto Rico
- Municipality: Toa Baja

Area
  - Total: 13.18 sq mi (34.1 km^{2})
  - Land: 12.08 sq mi (31.3 km^{2})
  - Water: 1.10 sq mi (2.8 km^{2})
- Elevation: 0 ft (0 m)

Population (2010)
  - Total: 53,192
  - Density: 4,403.3/sq mi (1,700.1/km^{2})
- Source: 2010 Census
- Time zone: UTC−4 (AST)
- ZIP code: 00952

Sabana Seca is a barrio in the municipality of Toa Baja, Puerto Rico. Its population in 2010 was 53,192.

== History ==
Sabana Seca was in Spain's gazetteers until Puerto Rico was ceded by Spain in the aftermath of the Spanish–American War under the terms of the Treaty of Paris of 1898 and became an unincorporated territory of the United States. In 1899, the United States Department of War conducted a census of Puerto Rico finding that the population of Sabana Seca barrio was 737.

Historical population
Census	Pop.	Note	%±
1900	737		—
1910	1,163		57.8%
1920	1,562		34.3%
1930	2,449		56.8%
1940	3,539		44.5%
1950	5,771		63.1%
1960	7,755		34.4%
1970	0		−100.0%
1980	50,368		—
1990	52,553		4.3%
2000	55,103		4.9%
2010	53,192		−3.5%
U.S. Decennial Census; 1899 (shown as 1900) 1910-1930; 1930-1950 1980-2000 2010

== Sectors ==
Barrios (which are, in contemporary times, roughly comparable to minor civil divisions) in turn are further subdivided into smaller local populated place areas/units called sectores (sectors in English). The types of sectores may vary, from normally sector to urbanización to reparto to barriada to residencial, among others.

The following sectors are in Sabana Seca barrio:

Calle Parcelas Nuevas, Calles: Las Marías, Sarón, Parque Oeste, Parque Norte, Parque Sur, Links, 5A, J. Link, Acueducto, Algarrobo, Higüero, La Milagrosa (Culto), León de Oro, Vargas, Bella Vista, Rejas, -F-, Progreso, Las Palmas, Iglesia Cristiana, Luz, Dolores Cruz, Vieja, Gardenia, Meléndez, Amapola, Comunidad Villa Kennedy, Comunidad Villa Marisol (Excepto 1003 Int. LJ-7), Condominio Aquaparque, Condominio Century Garden, Condominio El Atlántico, Condominio Lago Vista I y II, Condominio Lagoplaya, Condominio Lagos del Norte, Condominio Parque de las Gaviotas, Condominio Parque del Lago, Condominio Paseo Abril, Condominio Paseo Río Hondo, Cuarta Sección Levittown, Égida Golden Age Tower, Parcelas Viejas, Primera Sección de Levittown, Quinta Sección Levittown, Residencial Villa del Sabana, Sección Quinta A de Levittown, Sector Calle Iglesia Cristiana, Sector Camasey, Sector Campamento, Sector Cuatro Cuerdas, Sector El 26, Sector Ingenio, Sector La Franja, Sector La Furnia, Sector La Vega, Sector Los Bravos, Sector Los Magos, Sector Monserrate, Sector Propiedad Privada, Sector Punta Salinas, Sector Sabana Seca, Sector Villa Calma, Sector Villa Plebiscito, Segunda Sección de Levittown, Séptima Sección de Levittown, Sexta Sección Levittown, Tercera Sección Levittown, Urbanización Camino del Mar, Urbanización Campanilla, Urbanización El Naranjal, Urbanización Las Gaviotas, Urbanización Levittville Calle Juan Lines Ramos, Bloques JJ-1 al JJ-6, JK-23, 24 y JZ-1, Urbanización Mansión del Mar, Urbanización Mansión del Sol, Urbanización Mansiones del Lago, Urbanización Oasis, Urbanización Pabellones, Urbanización Pradera del Norte (Casas AX- 1 a la AX-14), Urbanización Punta Salinas Park, Urbanización Rosaleda I, Urbanización Rosaleda II, Urbanización Villas de Levittown, Urbanización Villas del Naranjal, and Urbanización y Extensión Lagos de Plata.

== Gallery ==
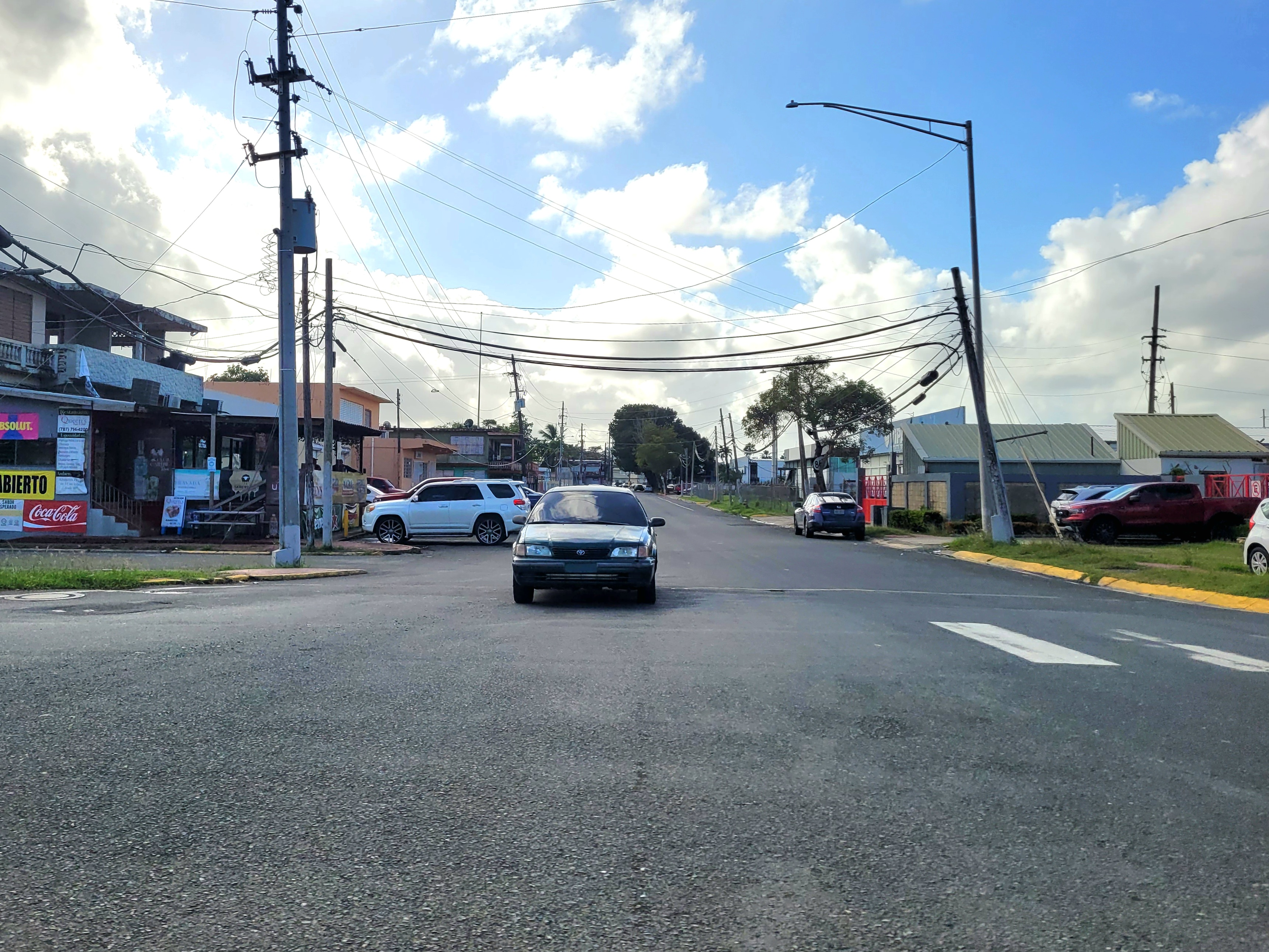
Puerto Rico Highway 867 between Sabana Seca and Media Luna

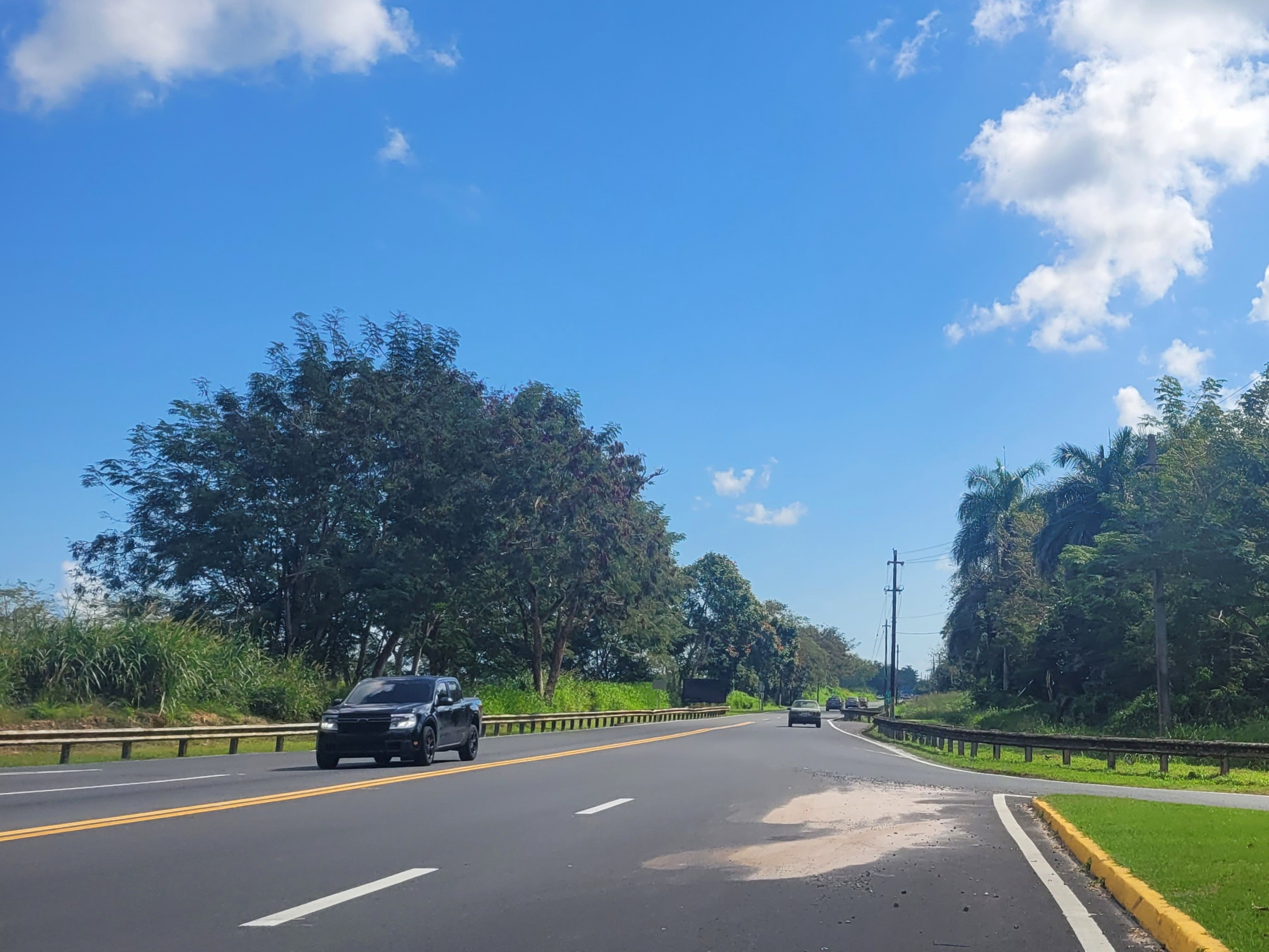
Puerto Rico Highway 867 between Media Luna and Sabana Seca

== See also ==
- 2009 Sabana Seca massacre
- List of communities in Puerto Rico
- List of barrios and sectors of Toa Baja, Puerto Rico
