= Toa Baja, Puerto Rico =

Town and municipality in Puerto Rico

Toa Baja Municipio Autónomo de Toa Baja
- Town and Municipality
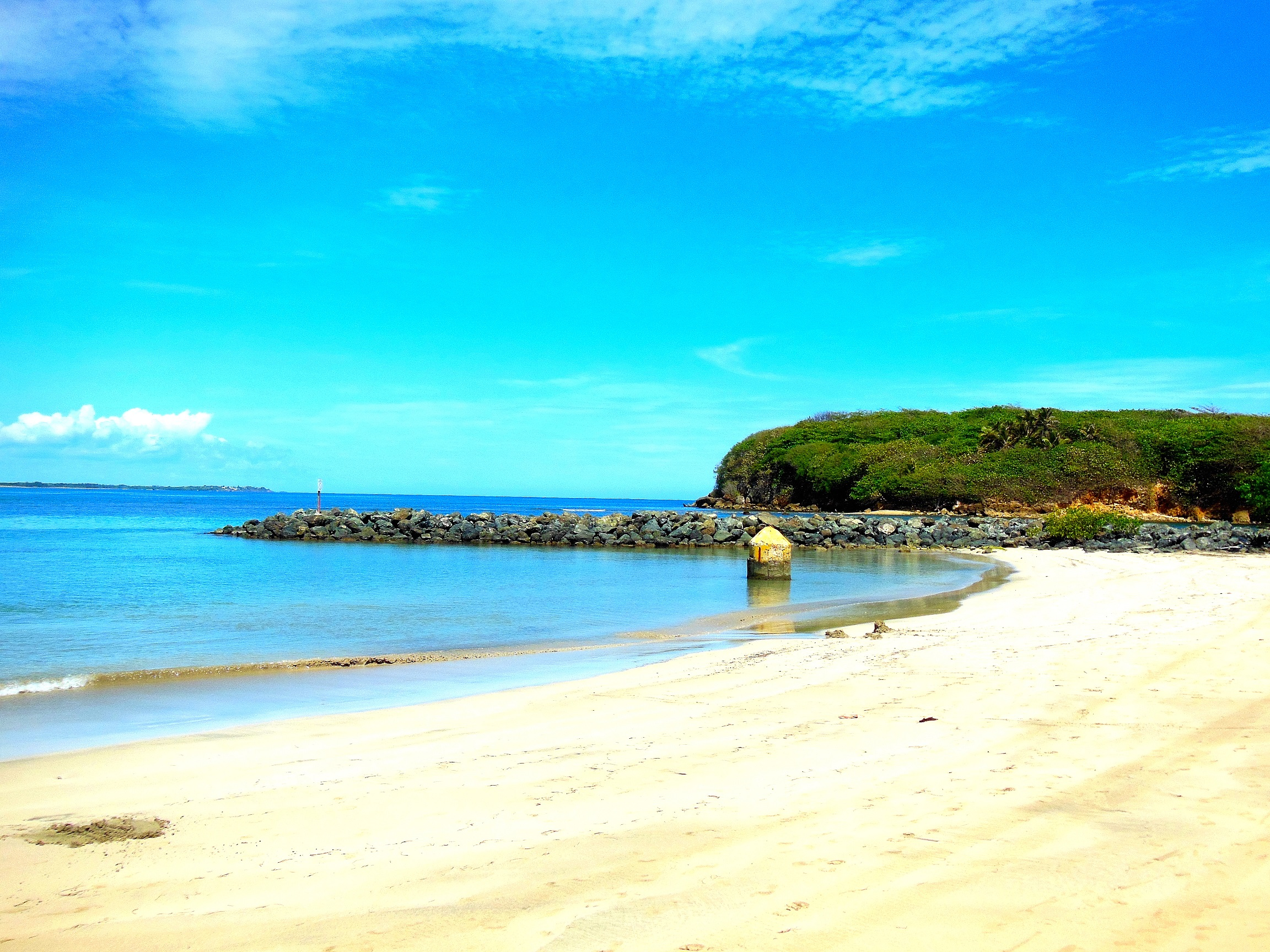
- Punta Salinas Beach in Toa Baja

- Flag Coat of arms
- Nicknames: Ciudad de los Valles del Toa, Ciudad Bajo Aguas, Los Llaneros
- Anthem: "Mi Pueblo Es Toa Baja"
- Map of Puerto Rico highlighting Toa Baja Municipality
- Coordinates: 18°26′38″N 66°15′35″W
- Sovereign state: United States
- Commonwealth: Puerto Rico
- Settled: 1745
- Founded: January 18, 1784
- Barrios: 5 barrios: Candelaria; Media Luna; Palo Seco; Sabana Seca; Toa Baja barrio-pueblo

Government
  - Mayor: Bernardo Márquez García (PNP)
  - Senatorial dist.: 2 - Bayamón
  - Representative dist.: 10

Area
  - Total: 41.7 sq mi (108.0 km^{2})
  - Land: 23.16 sq mi (59.99 km^{2})
  - Water: 18.54 sq mi (48.01 km^{2})

Population (2020)
  - Total: 75,293
  - Estimate (2025): 70,931 ▼
  - Rank: 8th in Puerto Rico
  - Density: 3,251/sq mi (1,255/km^{2})
- Demonym: Toabajeños
- Time zone: UTC−4 (AST)
- ZIP Codes: 00949, 00950, 00951, 00952
- Area code: 787/939
- Website: www.toabaja.com

Toa Baja (Spanish pronunciation: [ˈtoa ˈβaxa]) is a town and municipality of Puerto Rico located in the northern coast, north of Toa Alta and Bayamón; east of Dorado; and west of Cataño. Toa Baja is spread over five barrios, including Toa Baja Pueblo (the downtown area and the administrative center of the city). Toa Baja is part of the San Juan-Caguas-Guaynabo Combined Statistical Area. Toa Baja is located approximately twenty-five minutes by car from San Juan and two hours from Ponce, in non rush hour traffic.

== History ==
The region of what is now Toa Baja belonged to the Taíno region of Toa and Bayamón, which was located on the north coast of Puerto Rico. The regions were led by cacique Aramana and Majagua respectively. During the Spanish colonization, a farm was settled in the region around 1511 where Spanish settlers tried to learn from the Taínos how to grow fruits and vegetables. Some of the families who settled in the region were Marrero, Salgado, and Martínez, from the Canary Islands.

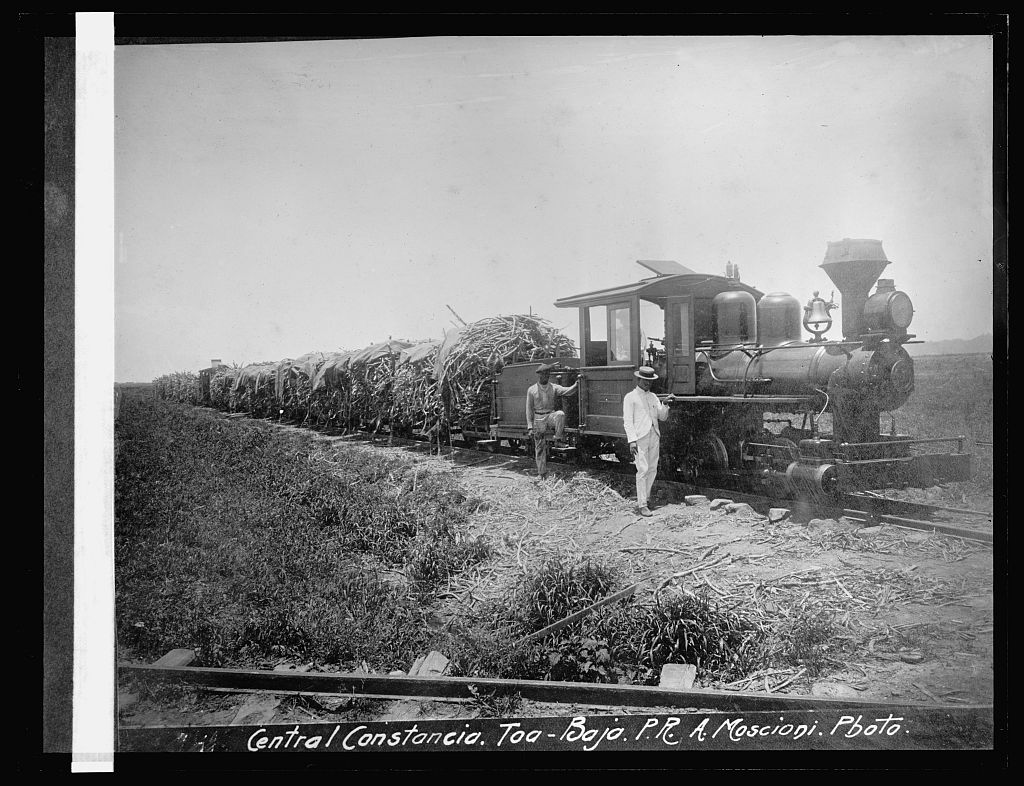
Train at Central Constancia, a 900-acre sugar cane farm in Toa Baja

In 1745, the town was officially organized, with the parish being built in 1749. It was dedicated to Nuestra Señora de la Concepción (Our Lady of the Immaculate Conception). It is said that in 1776 there were six cattle ranches and 12 sugar cane estates in the region. However, rises in the flow of nearby rivers were problematic for the population. Because of this, in 1841 a group of residents requested the settlement to be transferred to what is now Dorado. The municipality of Dorado was officially founded the next year.

Puerto Rico was ceded by Spain in the aftermath of the Spanish–American War under the terms of the Treaty of Paris of 1898 and became a territory of the United States. In 1899, the United States conducted its first census of Puerto Rico, finding that the population of Toa Baja was 4,030.

In 1902, the Legislative Assembly of Puerto Rico approved the consolidation of several municipalities, which resulted in the annexation of Toa Baja to the municipality of Bayamón. However, in 1905 the law was annulled, and Toa Baja regained its status as an independent town.

In 2010, Toa Baja was among the top ten municipalities in Puerto Rico, in terms of population, with 89,609 residents.

The La Plata River rose more than 11 feet on September 20, 2017 as a result of Hurricane Maria and caused major infrastructure damage in Toa Baja.

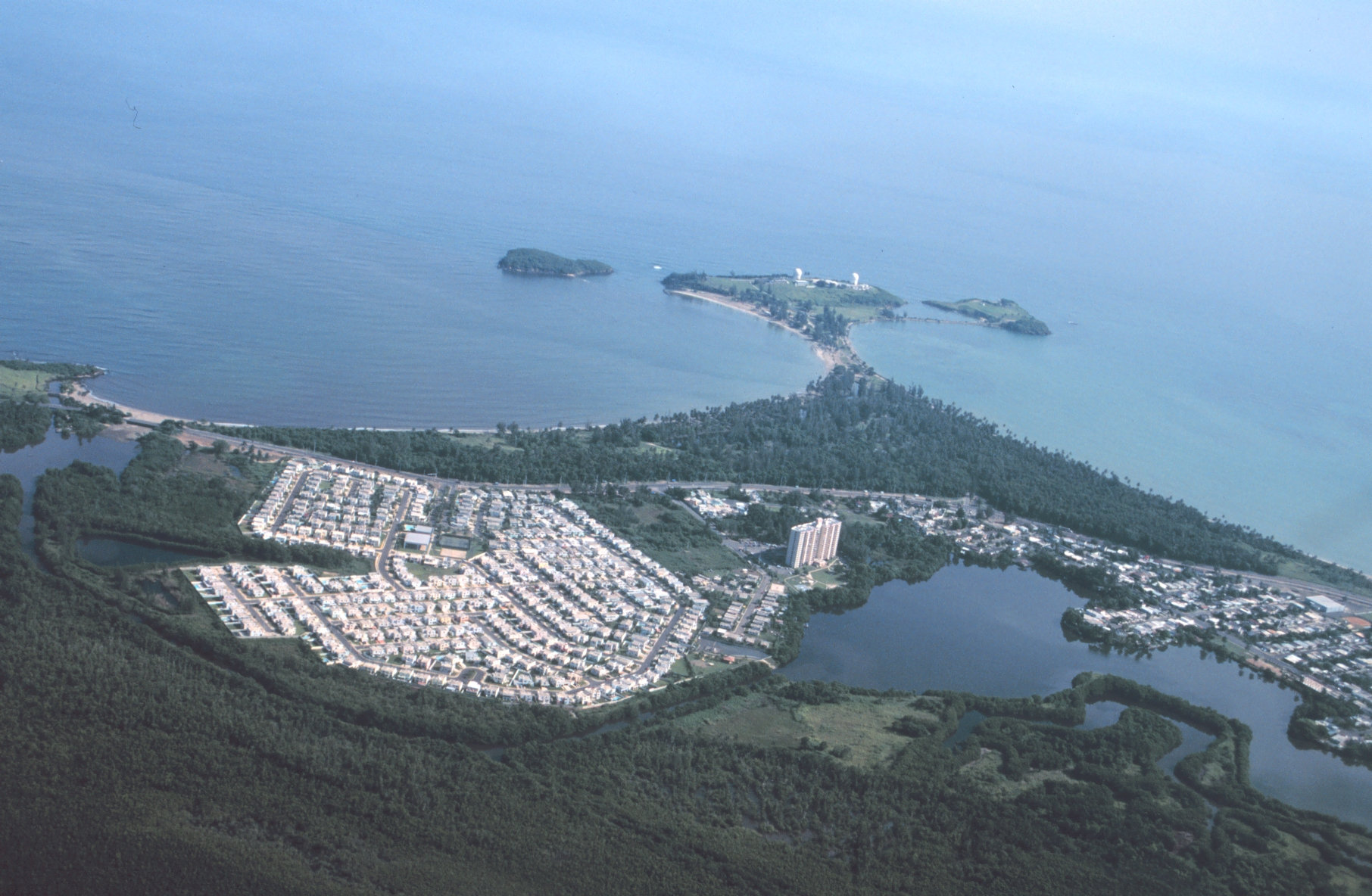
Radar installation at Punta Salinas in Toa Baja

The four radar systems used by the Federal Aviation Administration in Puerto Rico were broken and took almost two weeks to restore. One of the radar systems is located at Punta Salinas in Toa Baja.

=== Flood control project ===
In mid 2018, the United States Army Corps of Engineers announced it would be undertaking a major flood control project of the Río de la Plata river, which often causes flooding in Toa Baja.

== Geography ==
Toa Baja is located in the Northern Coastal Plains of the island, in the Northern Karst zone. It has an area of 24.0 miles^{2} (62.4 km^{2}). The terrain consists mostly of alluvial deposits and clay-like surface as a result of the surrounding waters.

The elevations range from 200 to 490 feet (60 to 150 meters) above sea level, with most of its highest parts located in the south. The rest of the area is mostly plain. The northern part of Toa Baja is characterized for its mangroves and marshes, while the southern part is classified as typical karst area.

Updated flood zone maps (as of 2019) show that Toa Baja is extremely vulnerable to flooding, along with Humacao, Rincón, Barceloneta, and Corozal. For its many rivers, almost the entire municipality of Toa Baja is in the flood zone area. Homes in Toa Baja have historically been built a few feet above ground level to account for flooding. After Hurricane Maria, architects from the University of Puerto Rico and Polytechnic University of Puerto Rico provided residents of Toa Baja with ideas on how to mitigate flooding.

=== Water features ===
There are three main rivers in Toa Baja: Río de la Plata, Río Cocal, and Río Hondo. La Plata is the longest river on the island and crosses Toa Baja in the east. Cocal is the natural boundary between Toa Baja and Dorado. Boca Vieja Bay (Spanish: Ensenada Boca Vieja) is a bay located in Toa Baja.

=== Barrios ===
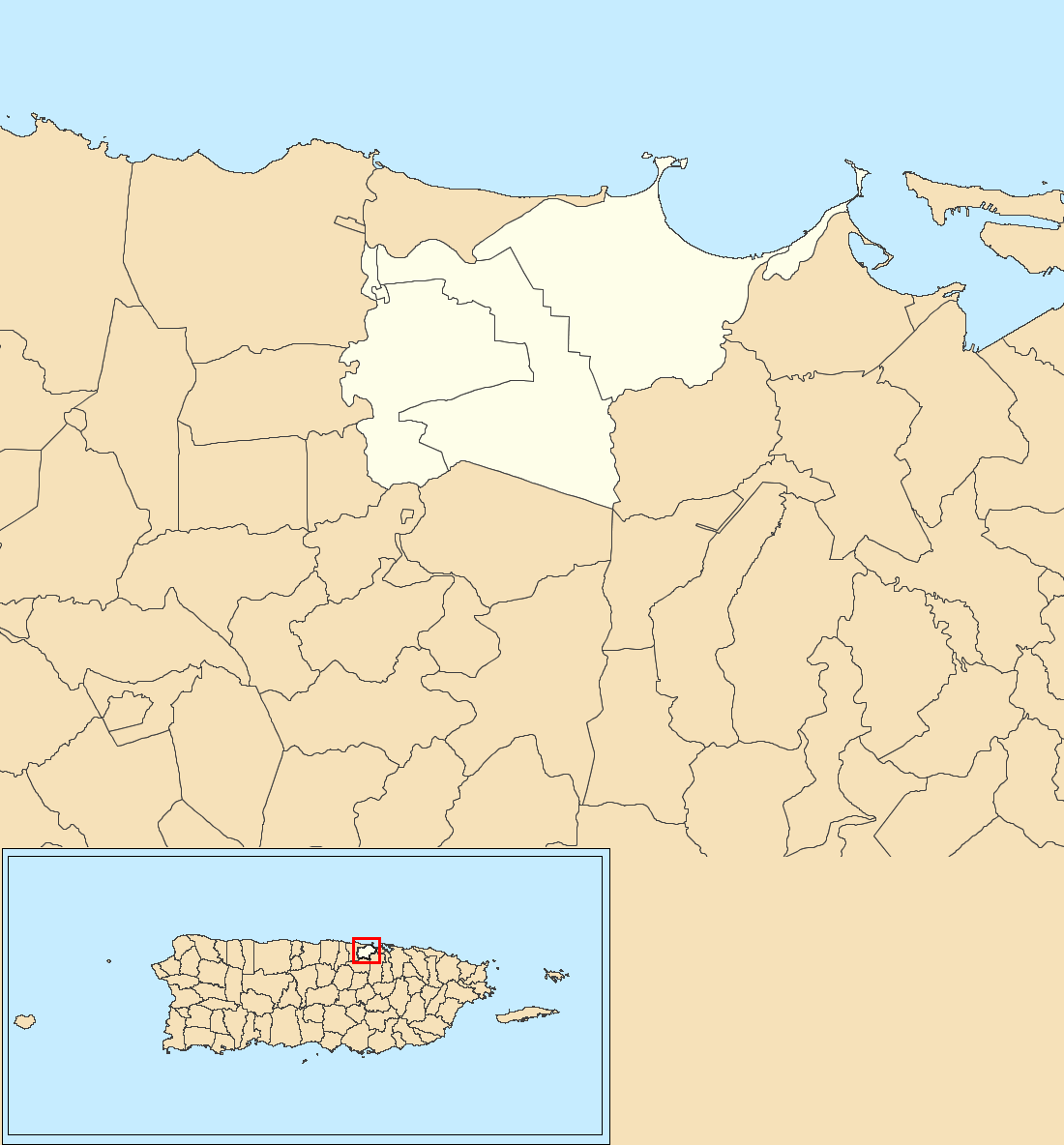
Subdivisions of Toa Baja

Like all municipalities of Puerto Rico, Toa Baja is subdivided into barrios. The municipal buildings, central square and large Catholic church are located in a barrio referred to as "el pueblo".

1. Candelaria
2. Media Luna
3. Palo Seco
4. Sabana Seca
5. Toa Baja barrio-pueblo

Although not a barrio, Levittown is the most populated community in the municipality of Toa Baja.

=== Sectors ===
Barrios (which are, in contemporary times, roughly comparable to minor civil divisions) are further subdivided into smaller areas called sectores (sectors in English). The types of sectores may vary, from normally sector to urbanización to reparto to barriada to residencial, among others.

=== Special Communities ===
Comunidades Especiales de Puerto Rico (Special Communities of Puerto Rico) are marginalized communities whose citizens are experiencing a certain amount of social exclusion. A map shows these communities occur in nearly every municipality of the commonwealth. Of the 742 places that were on the list in 2014, the following barrios, communities, sectors, or neighborhoods were in Toa Baja: Sector Villa Hostos (Campanillas), San José, Sector El 26, Toa Ville, Villa Albizu in Candelaria, Villa Calma, Villa del Sol, Villa Esperanza, Villa Marisol, and Villa Quintero.

In 2009, an order was given by Governor Luis G. Fortuño to shut off essential services, such as water and electricity, to Villas del Sol, a "Special Community", which consisted of homes built illegally on flood-prone, state land. The Federal Emergency Management Agency bought these homes from the Puerto Rican government in order to keep the land from being used further. In January 2010, the Puerto Rican government began demolishing some of the homes. The village had a large population of Dominicans, including undocumented immigrants. In 2013, the mayor and the community continued to argue about how to construct in Villas del Sol. By 2016, six years after the community had been promised, by the government of Toa Baja, that it would receive permits for the building of critical infrastructure, it had not. Some families had dispersed, others had constructed humble homes on land obtained from a private donor.

== Demographics ==
Historical population
Census	Pop.	Note	%±
1900	4,030		—
1910	6,254		55.2%
1920	7,121		13.9%
1930	9,865		38.5%
1940	11,410		15.7%
1950	15,761		38.1%
1960	19,698		25.0%
1970	46,384		135.5%
1980	78,246		68.7%
1990	89,454		14.3%
2000	94,085		5.2%
2010	89,609		−4.8%
2020	75,293		−16.0%
2025 (est.)	70,931	▼	−5.8%
U.S. Decennial Census; 1899 (shown as 1900) 1910-1930; 1930-1950 1960-2000 2010 2020

Race (self-defined) Toa Baja, Puerto Rico – 2010 Census
Race	Population	% of Total
White	62,920	70.2%
Black/African American	15,074	16.8%
American Indian and Alaska Native	522	0.6%
Asian	228	0.3%
Some other race	7,787	8.7%
Two or more races	3,076	3.4%

In 2020, Toa Baja had a population of 75,293. This represents a decrease of 16% since 2010, when the population was 89,609. In 2000, the population was 94,085. The population in Toa Baja had steadily increased from 1899, when it had 4,030.

== Tourism ==
=== Landmarks and places of interest ===
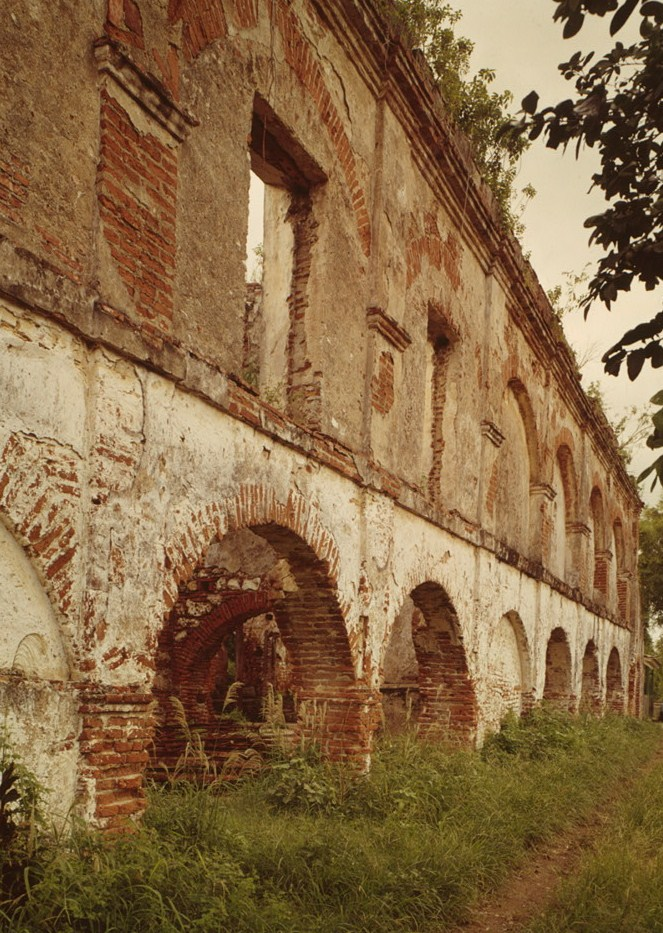
Sugar Mill ruins of the Santa Elena Hacienda

There are 22 beaches in Toa Baja. Some main attractions of Toa Baja include:

- Cañuelo Fortress
- Central Constancia (sugar mill)
- Isla de Cabras
- Hacienda Santa Elena
- Hermana Island
- Nuestra Señora del Carmen Church
- Palo Seco Thermoelectrical Power Station
- Punta Salinas Beach
- San Pedro Apostle Church
- Coliseo Antonio R. Barceló

== Culture ==
=== Festivals and events ===
Toa Baja celebrates its patron saint festival in June. The Fiestas Patronales de San Pedro Apostol is a religious and cultural celebration in honor of Saint Peter and generally features parades, games, artisans, amusement rides, regional food, and live entertainment.

Fiestas de la Santa Cruz is celebrated in May with the participation of various churches and cultural groups. It is dedicated to the Holy Cross, and lasts nine nights.

In October, the town celebrates the Festival de la Zafra with musical groups of bomba and plena.

Other festivals and events celebrated in Toa Baja include:

- Artisans Festival (Feria de Artesanías) – March
- Beach Festival – July
- Musical Bands Festival – August
- Christmas Festival – December

=== Sports ===
Toa Baja doesn't have a team in the island's main male sports leagues. They do have a female volleyball team from the Liga de Voleibol Superior Femenino, the Llaneras de Toa Baja.

Each year, Toa Baja hosts both the Pee Wee Reese World Series (for baseball players of ages 12 and under) and the Willie Mays World Series (for baseball players of ages 10 and under). The town has a team, the Llaneros de Levittown, in the PeeWee Reese Category baseball team from the Pro-Deportes/American Amateur Baseball Congress.

== Economy ==
For many years, Toa Baja's economy relied in agriculture, particularly sugar cane and cattle. Because of this, the municipality was the site of many important haciendas like Santa Elena (founded in 1790), Central Constancia (founded in 1867), and Media Luna. In the middle of the 18th century, fishing also became a primary source of Toa Baja's economy. Cattle ranches were also among the best in the island, processing large amounts of milk. The growth of small fruits also continues to be one of Toa Baja's main products.

After the 1950s, manufacturing started replacing agriculture as the main economic source. Currently, the industrial sector continues to be one of the most important factors of economic growth in the region. Some of the products manufactured in Toa Baja are metal, plastic, concrete, textile, electrical and electronic machinery, and rum.

== Government ==
All municipalities in Puerto Rico are administered by a mayor, elected every four years. The current mayor of Toa Baja is Bernardo "Betito" Márquez García, of the New Progressive Party (PNP). He was first elected at the 2016 general elections.

The city belongs to the Puerto Rico Senatorial district II, which is represented by two Senators. Migdalia Padilla and Carmelo Ríos Santiago have served as District Senators since 2005.

== Symbols ==
The municipio has an official flag and coat of arms.

=== Flag ===
Toa Baja's official flag features two vertical bands: the left side is green and the right side is gold. The green band represents the plains of the Toa River (now known as La Plata), and the golden band represents the sun. The green band features two keys, one across the other. One is gold and the other silver, symbolizing the Apostle Saint Peter, the patron saint of the city.

=== Coat of arms ===
Toa Baja's coat of arms

Toa Baja's coat of arms features a green waving stripe, representing the Toa River, one of the first mentioned in the history of Puerto Rico. Like the flag, it features two keys, one across the other, symbolizing Saint Peter, patron saint of the town. The coat has the letters "F" and "J" to each side of the keys, representing Ferdinand II of Aragon and V of Castile, and his daughter, Joanna of Castile, sovereign of Castile and León.

The gold fields above and below the green stripe represent the wealth of the city. It also feature handfuls of yucca, one of the main crops of this area. It constitutes a symbol of the Taínos who cultivated it, and whose main food was cassava or bread of yucca. Two sugar cane stems surround the shield, representing the cultivation and industry of sugar cane, which was the main source of Toa Baja's economy.

== Transportation ==
Toa Baja is approximately 25 minutes in non-rush hour from San Juan by car, however, it may take up to 90 minutes in rush hour. The main road to the city is the PR-22 and PR-165.

A new bus rapid transit (BRT) system called Metro Urbano operates in the center of José de Diego Expressway (PR-22) in high-occupancy vehicle lanes (HOV) from Candelaria in Toa Baja to the Bayamón Station of the Tren Urbano metro system.

There are 29 bridges in Toa Baja.

== Notable people ==
- Susana Centeno, nurse
- Edwin Rosario (1963–1997) - professional boxer. 4 time world champion. Inducted to IBHOF in 2006
- Madison Anderson - Miss Universe Puerto Rico 2019 and Miss Universe 2019 1st Runner-Up

== Gallery ==
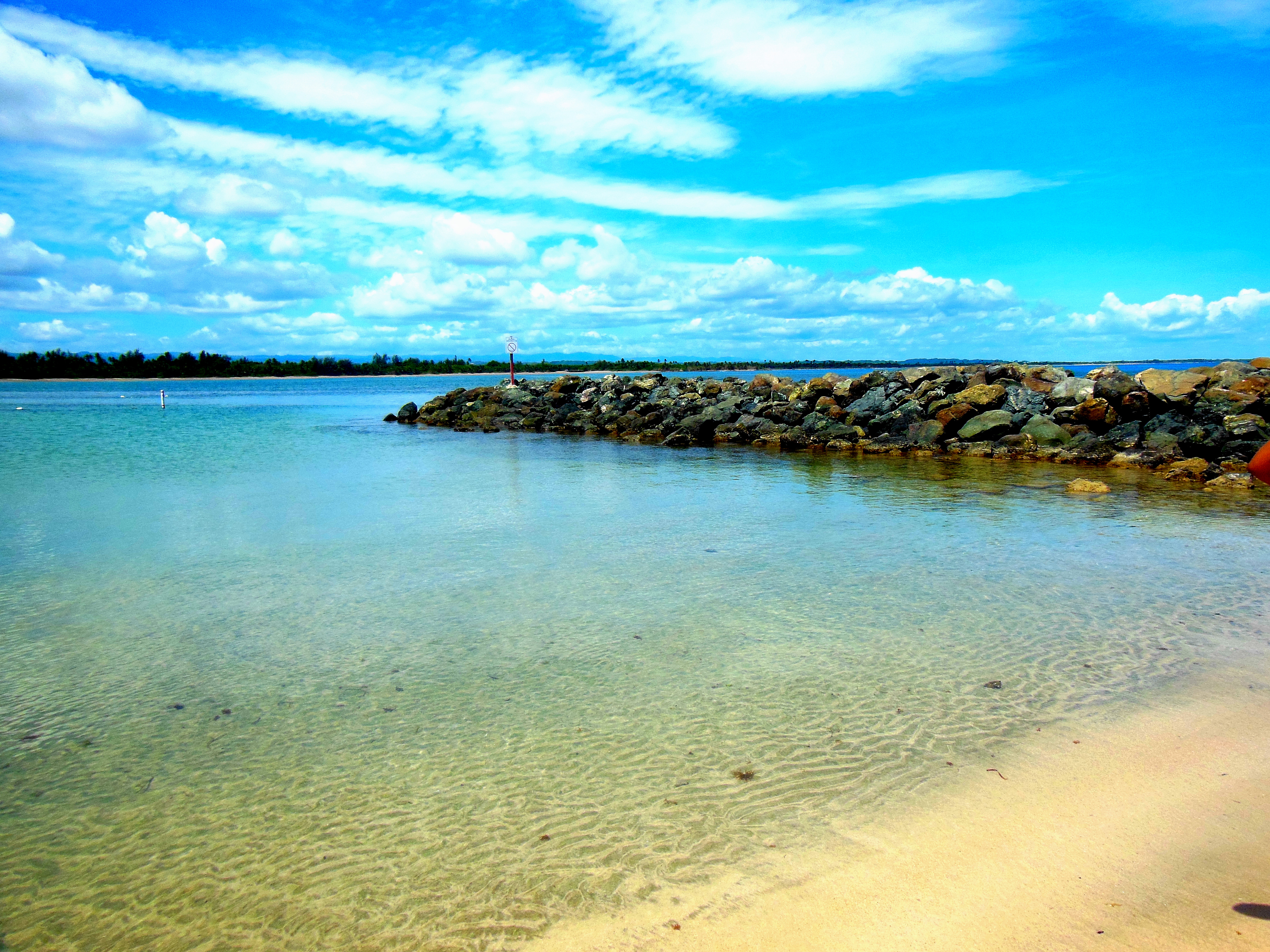
Beach in Sabana Seca barrio

== See also ==
- List of Puerto Ricans
- History of Puerto Rico
- Did you know-Puerto Rico?
- 2009 Sabana Seca massacre, Sabana Seca area of Toa Baja
