= Puerto Rico Highway 863 =

Highway in Puerto Rico

Highway 863
- Ruta 863
- Carretera José "Manrique" Rivera Torres

Route information
- Maintained by Puerto Rico DTPW
- Length: 2.5 km (1.6 mi)

Major junctions
- West end: PR-2 in Candelaria
- PR-819 in Candelaria
- East end: PR-862 in Mucarabones–Candelaria–Pájaros–Hato Tejas

Location
- Country: United States
- Territory: Puerto Rico
- Municipalities: Toa Baja

Highway system
- Roads in Puerto Rico; List
← PR-862	→ PR-864

Puerto Rico Highway 863 (PR-863) is a road located in the municipality of Toa Baja in Puerto Rico. With a length of 2.5 kilometers (1.6 mi), it begins at its intersection with PR-2 in Candelaria barrio and ends at its junction with PR-862 on the Toa Baja–Toa Alta–Bayamón municipal tripoint.

== Route description ==
This highway has a single lane per direction in the entire length and provides access to several communities and neighborhood developments between Candelaria, Mucarabones and Hato Tejas barrios. Located within Candelaria barrio, PR-863 extends to the south from PR-2 junction to PR-819 intersection. Then, it turns to the southeast through southeastern Candelaria until its terminus at PR-862 junction on the Toa Baja's southernmost point.

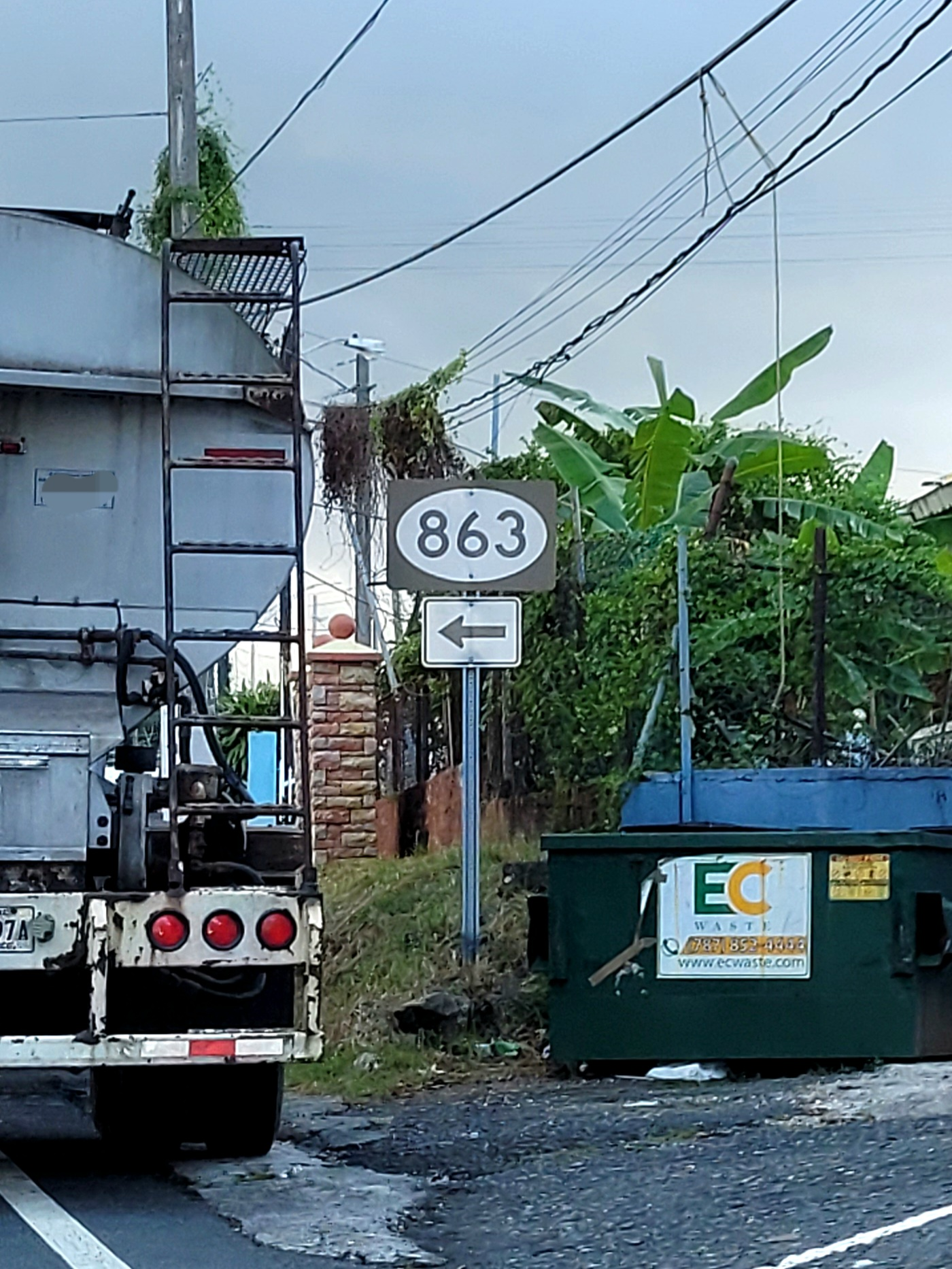
PR-2 west at PR-863 intersection in Candelaria barrio

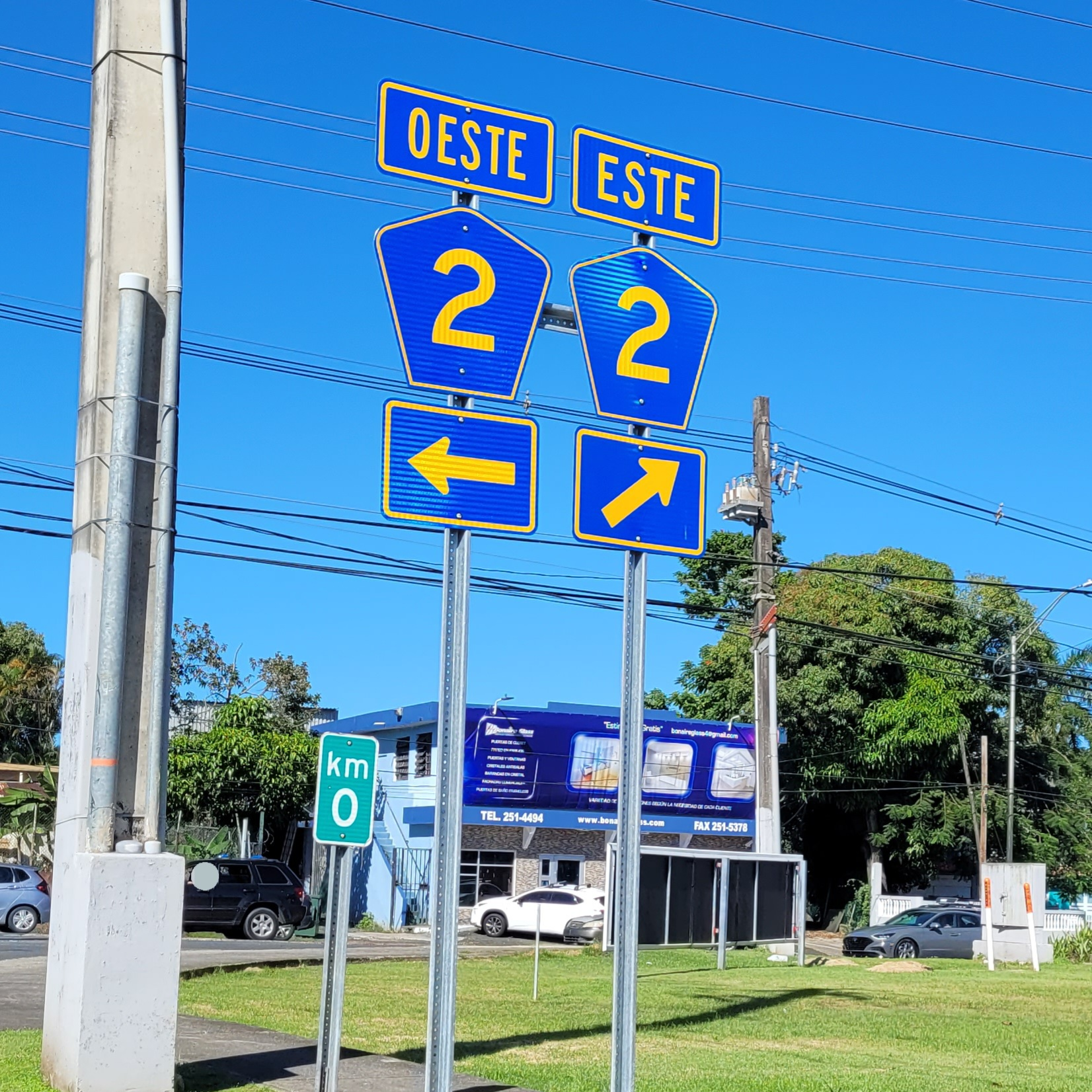
Signs for PR-2 at the western terminus of PR-863 in Candelaria barrio

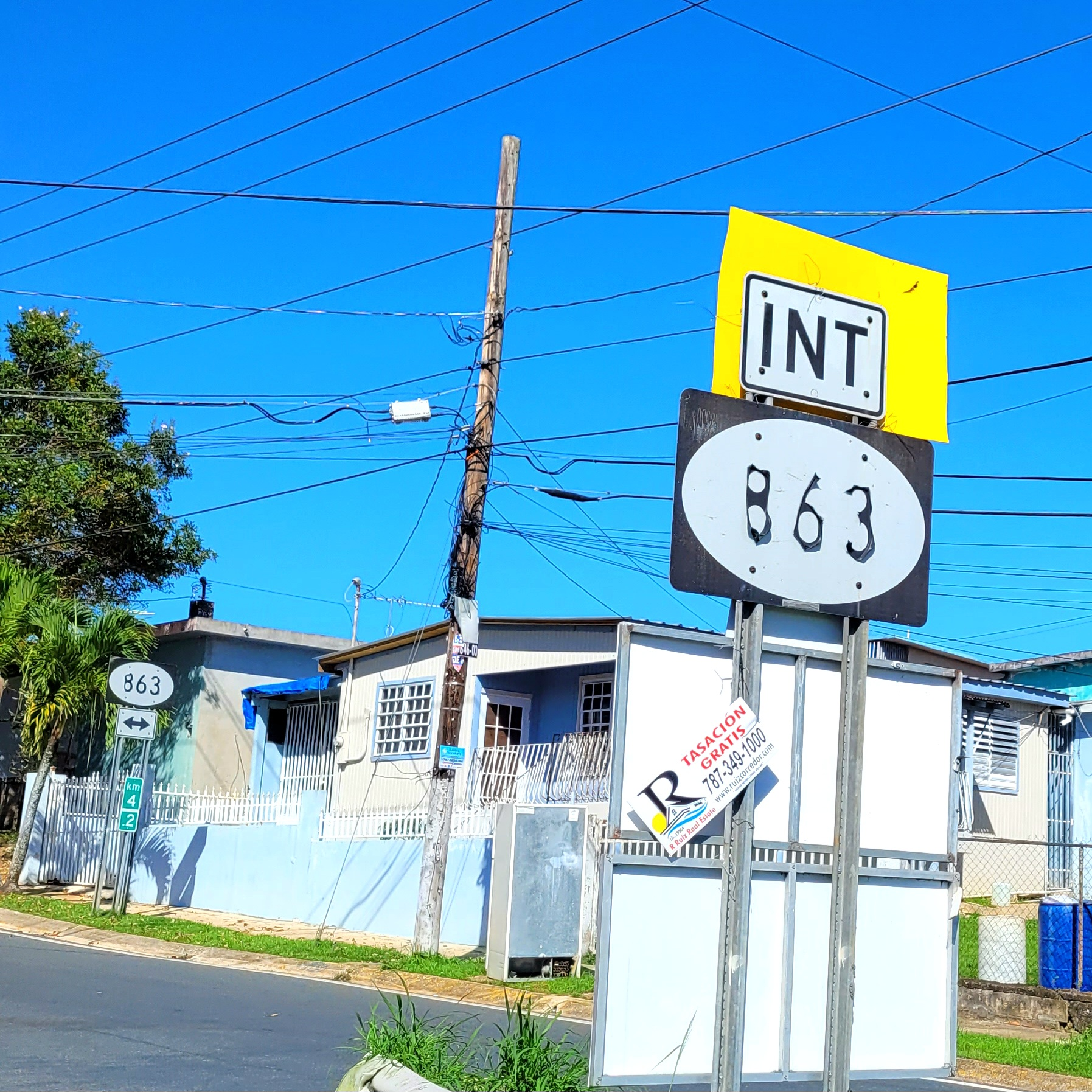
Northern terminus of PR-819 at PR-863 junction in Candelaria barrio

== History ==
Prior to its numerical designation, PR-863 was only known as Camino Frailes. The current numerical designation corresponds to the 1953 Puerto Rico highway renumbering, a process implemented by the Puerto Rico Department of Transportation and Public Works (Spanish: Departamento de Transportación y Obras Públicas) that increased the insular highway network to connect existing routes with different locations around Puerto Rico.

== Major intersections ==
Municipality	Location	km	mi	Destinations	Notes
Toa Baja	Candelaria	0.0	0.0	PR-2 – Bayamón, Arecibo	Western terminus of PR-863
Toa Baja	Candelaria	0.6– 0.7	0.37– 0.43	PR-819 – Toa Alta	
Toa Alta–Toa Baja– Bayamón municipal tripoint	Mucarabones–Candelaria– Pájaros–Hato Tejas quadripoint	2.5	1.6	PR-862 – Toa Alta, Bayamón	Eastern terminus of PR-863
1.000 mi = 1.609 km; 1.000 km = 0.621 mi
