= La Candelaria =

La Candelaria may refer to:

- La Candelaria, Catamarca, a village and rural municipality in Catamarca Province, Argentina
- La Candelaria, Salta, a village and rural municipality in Salta Province, Argentina
- La Candelaria Department, Salta Province, Argentina
- La Candelaria, Bogotá, Colombia
- La Candelaria Parish, Caracas, Venezuela

== See also ==
- Candelaria (disambiguation)
