= Candelaria =

Candelaria or Candelária may refer to:

== People ==
- Jacob Candelaria (born 1987), American politician and attorney
- John Candelaria (born 1953), American baseball pitcher
- Luis Candelaria (1892–1963), Argentine military aviator, who completed the first air crossing of the Andes in 1918
- Nash Candelaria (1928–2016), American author
- Richard G. Candelaria (1922–2024), American WWII fighter ace

== Places ==
=== Argentina ===
- Candelaria, Misiones, Misiones Province
- Candelaria, San Luis, a village and municipality in San Luis Province
- La Candelaria, Catamarca, a village and municipality in Catamarca Province
- La Candelaria, Salta, a village and rural municipality in Salta Province

=== Brazil ===
- Candelária Church, a historical church in Rio de Janeiro
- Candelária, Rio Grande do Sul

=== Chile ===
- Candelaria mine, a copper deposit in Atacama Region

=== Colombia ===
- Candelaria, Valle del Cauca
- Candelaria, Atlántico
- La Candelaria, Bogotá, a historic neighborhood in Bogotá

=== Cuba ===
- Candelaria, Cuba, Artemisa Province

=== El Salvador ===
- Candelaria, Cuscatlán
- Candelaria de la Frontera

=== Guatemala ===
- Candelaria Caves, a natural cave system in the municipalities of Chisec and Raxruha

=== Honduras ===
- Candelaria, Lempira

=== Mexico ===
- Candelaria Municipality, Campeche
  - Candelaria railway station, a Tren Maya station
- Candelaria Loxicha
- Candelaria metro station, a station on the Mexico City Metro

=== Philippines ===
- Candelaria, Quezon
  - Candelaria station (PNR), a railway station that is part of the PNR South Long Haul project
- Candelaria, Zambales

=== Portugal ===
- Candelária (Madalena), a civil parish in the municipality of Madalena, island of Pico, Azores
- Candelária (Ponta Delgada), a civil parish in the municipality of Ponta Delgada, island of São Miguel, Azores

=== Puerto Rico ===
- Mayagüez, Puerto Rico, founded as Nuestra Señora de la Candelaria
- Candelaria, Lajas, Puerto Rico, a barrio
- Candelaria, Toa Baja, Puerto Rico, a barrio
- Candelaria, Vega Alta, Puerto Rico, a barrio

=== Spain ===
- Candelaria, Tenerife, a municipality in the island of Tenerife, Santa Cruz de Tenerife, Canary Islands

=== United States ===
- Candelaria, Texas, Presidio County
- Candelaria, Nevada, a mining ghost town

== Religion ==
- Fiesta de la Candelaria or Candlemas
- Virgin of Candelaria, an apparition of the Virgin Mary

== Other ==
- Candelaria (lichen), a genus of yellow lichens
- Candelaria (reptile), an extinct genus of owenettid parareptiles
- Candelaria (film), a 2017 romantic drama film
- Candelária massacre, a 1993 massacre in Rio de Janeiro, Brazil
- Candelária Sport Clube, a roller hockey team from the civil parish of Candelária
- Club Atlético Candelaria, an Argentine football club from Misiones Province

== See also ==
- Candelario (disambiguation)
- La Candelaria (disambiguation)
