= Puerto Rico Highway 862 =

Highway in Puerto Rico

Highway 862
- Ruta 862

Route information
- Maintained by Puerto Rico DTPW
- Length: 3.6 km (2.2 mi)

Major junctions
- South end: PR-861 in Pájaros
- PR-863 in Pájaros–Hato Tejas–Candelaria–Mucarabones
- North end: PR-864 in Hato Tejas

Location
- Country: United States
- Territory: Puerto Rico
- Municipalities: Bayamón, Toa Alta, Toa Baja

Highway system
- Roads in Puerto Rico; List
← PR-823	→ PR-863

Puerto Rico Highway 862 (PR-862) is a north–south road located between the municipalities of Bayamón and Toa Alta in Puerto Rico. With a length of 3.6 kilometers (2.2 mi), it begins at its intersection with PR-861 in Pájaros barrio and ends at its junction with PR-864 in Hato Tejas area.

== Route description ==
This highway has a single lane per direction in the entire length and provides access to several communities and neighborhood developments between Pájaros, Mucarabones, Candelaria and Hato Tejas barrios. In Bayamón, PR-862 has two segments separated by the one located within Toa Alta. The southern section in Bayamón is located in Pájaros barrio, extending from its southern terminus at PR-861 junction to the Toa Alta municipal limit. In Toa Alta, it has a short length though Mucarabones barrio, extending from the Bayamón municipal limit to its intersection with PR-863 on the Toa Alta–Toa Baja–Bayamón municipal tripoint. Then, PR-862 continues to the north through Hato Tejas barrio as the northern section in Bayamón until its end at PR-864.

Puerto Rico Highway 862

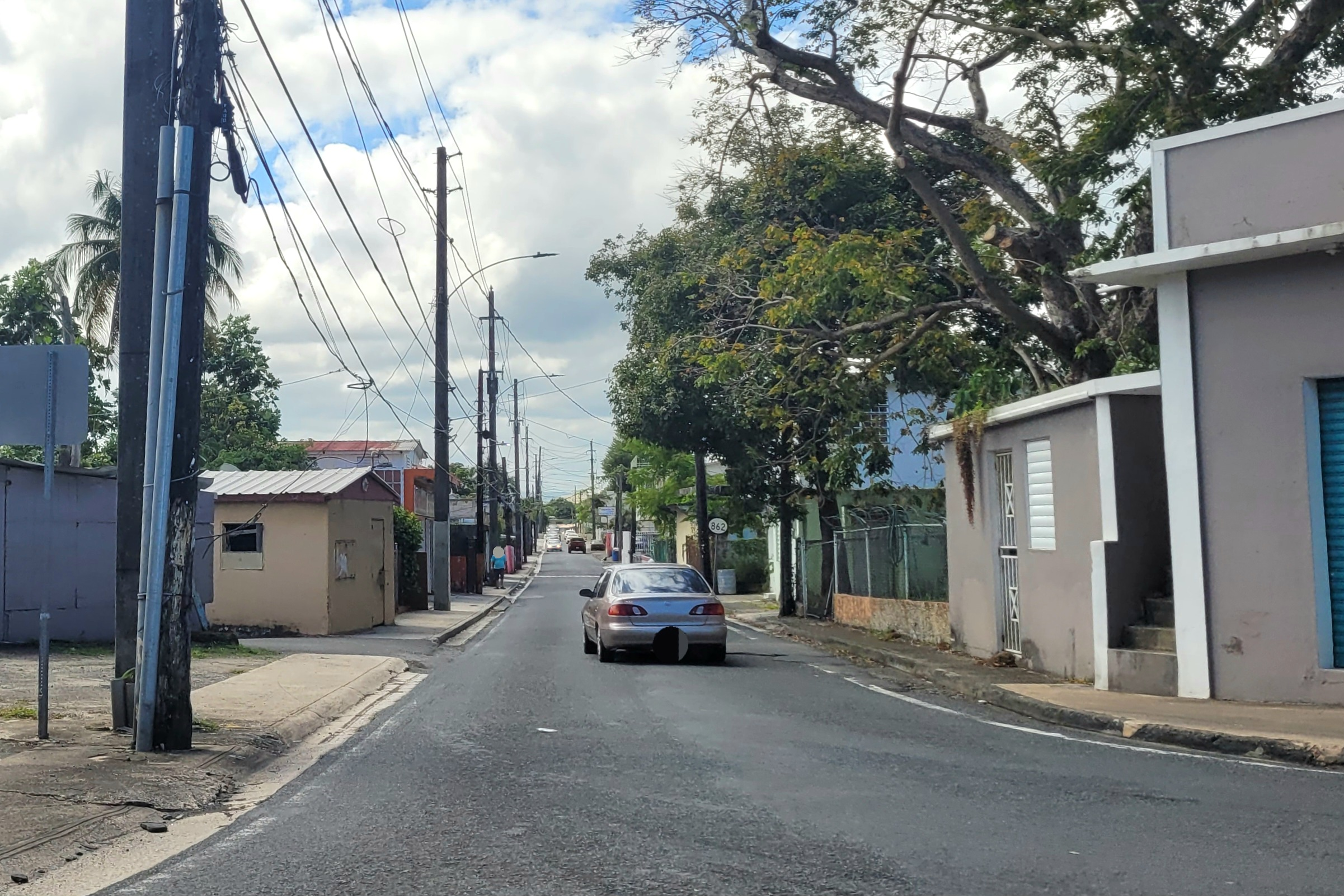
Northern terminus at PR-864 junction in Hato Tejas, Bayamón, looking south

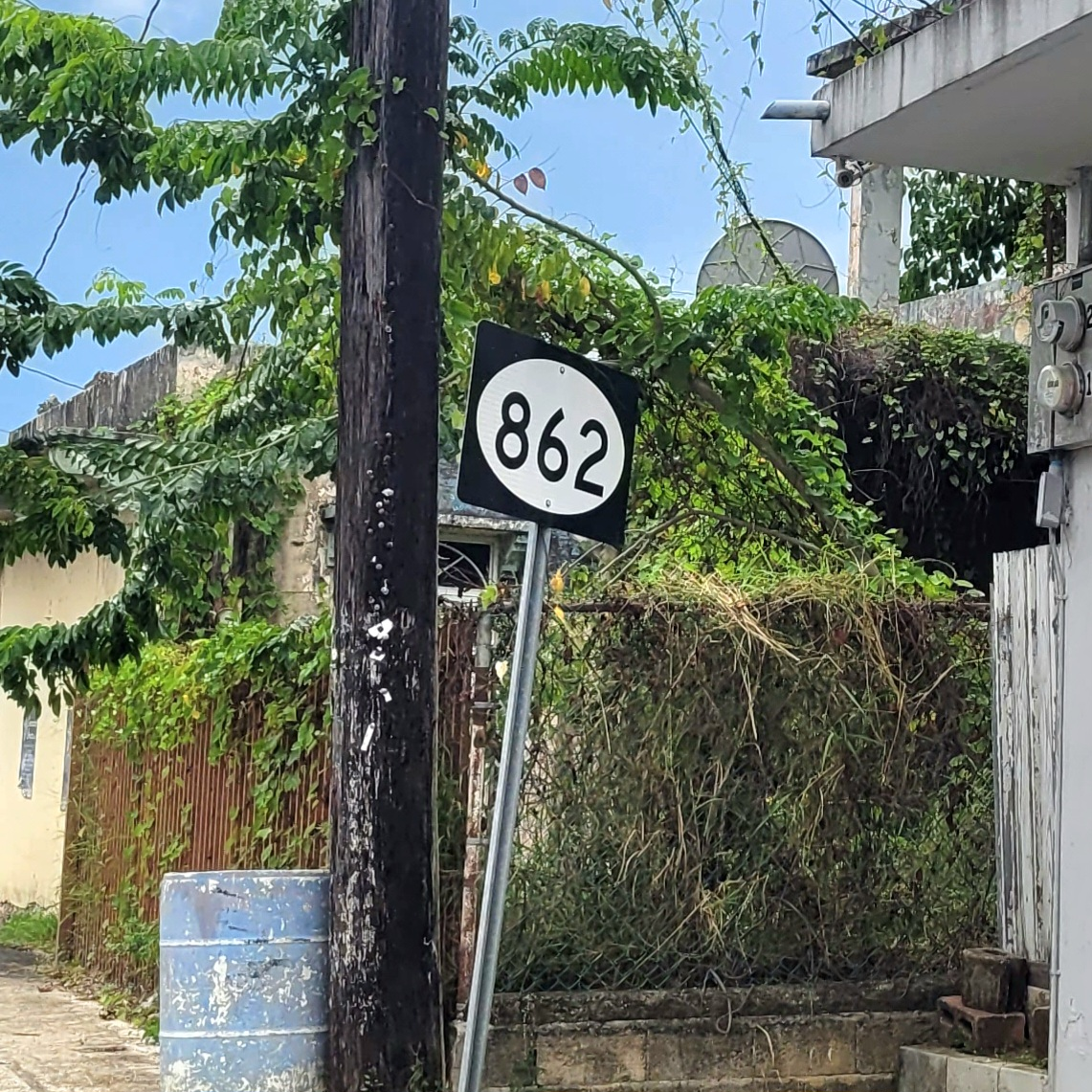
Southbound sign in Hato Tejas, Bayamón

== History ==
Prior to its numerical designation, PR-862 was only known as Camino Pájaros. The current numerical designation corresponds to the 1953 Puerto Rico highway renumbering, a process implemented by the Puerto Rico Department of Transportation and Public Works (Spanish: Departamento de Transportación y Obras Públicas) that increased the insular highway network to connect existing routes with different locations around Puerto Rico.

== Major intersections ==
Municipality	Location	km	mi	Destinations	Notes
Bayamón	Pájaros	0.0	0.0	PR-861 (Avenida Vista Alta) – Bayamón, Toa Alta	Southern terminus of PR-862
Toa Alta	No major junctions				
Bayamón–Toa Baja– Toa Alta municipal tripoint	Pájaros–Hato Tejas– Candelaria–Mucarabones quadripoint	1.3	0.81	PR-863 – Toa Baja	
Bayamón	Hato Tejas	3.6	2.2	PR-864 – Bayamón	Northern terminus of PR-862
1.000 mi = 1.609 km; 1.000 km = 0.621 mi
