= La Candelaria Department =

La Candelaria
- Department
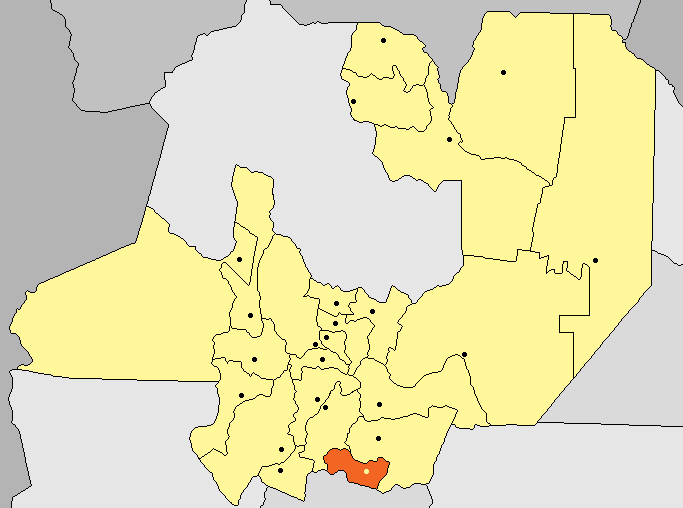
- Coordinates: 26°00′00″S 65°00′00″W
- Country: Argentina
- Province: Salta

Area
  - Total: 1,525 km^{2} (589 sq mi)

Population (2010)
  - Total: 5,704
  - Density: 3.740/km^{2} (9.687/sq mi)

La Candelaria is a department located in Salta Province, Argentina.

With an area of 1,525 km^{2} (589 sq mi) it borders to the north and east with Bolivia, to the east with Rosario de la Frontera Department, to the west with Guachipas Department, and to the south with Tucumán Province.

== Towns and municipalities ==
- El Jardín
- El Tala
- La Candelaria
