= Puerto Rico Highway 819 =

Highway in Puerto Rico

Highway 819
- Ruta 819

Route information
- Maintained by Puerto Rico DTPW
- Length: 4.2 km (2.6 mi)

Major junctions
- South end: PR-861 in Ortíz–Mucarabones
- North end: PR-863 in Candelaria

Location
- Country: United States
- Territory: Puerto Rico
- Municipalities: Toa Alta, Toa Baja

Highway system
- Roads in Puerto Rico; List
← PR-818	→ PR-820

Puerto Rico Highway 819 (PR-819) is a north–south rural road located between the municipalities of Toa Alta and Toa Baja in Puerto Rico. With a length of 4.2 kilometers (2.6 mi), it begins at PR-861 on the Ortiz–Mucarabones line in Toa Alta, and ends at PR-863 in Candelaria barrio in Toa Baja.

== Route description ==
Due to its rural characteristics, PR-819 has a single lane per direction in the entire length. In Toa Alta, this highway extends from its southern terminus at PR-861 junction between Ortiz and Mucarabones barrios to the Toa Baja municipal limit, passing through several neighborhoods and crossing the Río Bucarabones in Mucarabones. In Toa Baja, the road continues to the north through Candelaria barrio, where it also serves as the main access to several neighborhoods, extending from the Toa Alta municipal limit to the northern terminus at PR-863 junction.

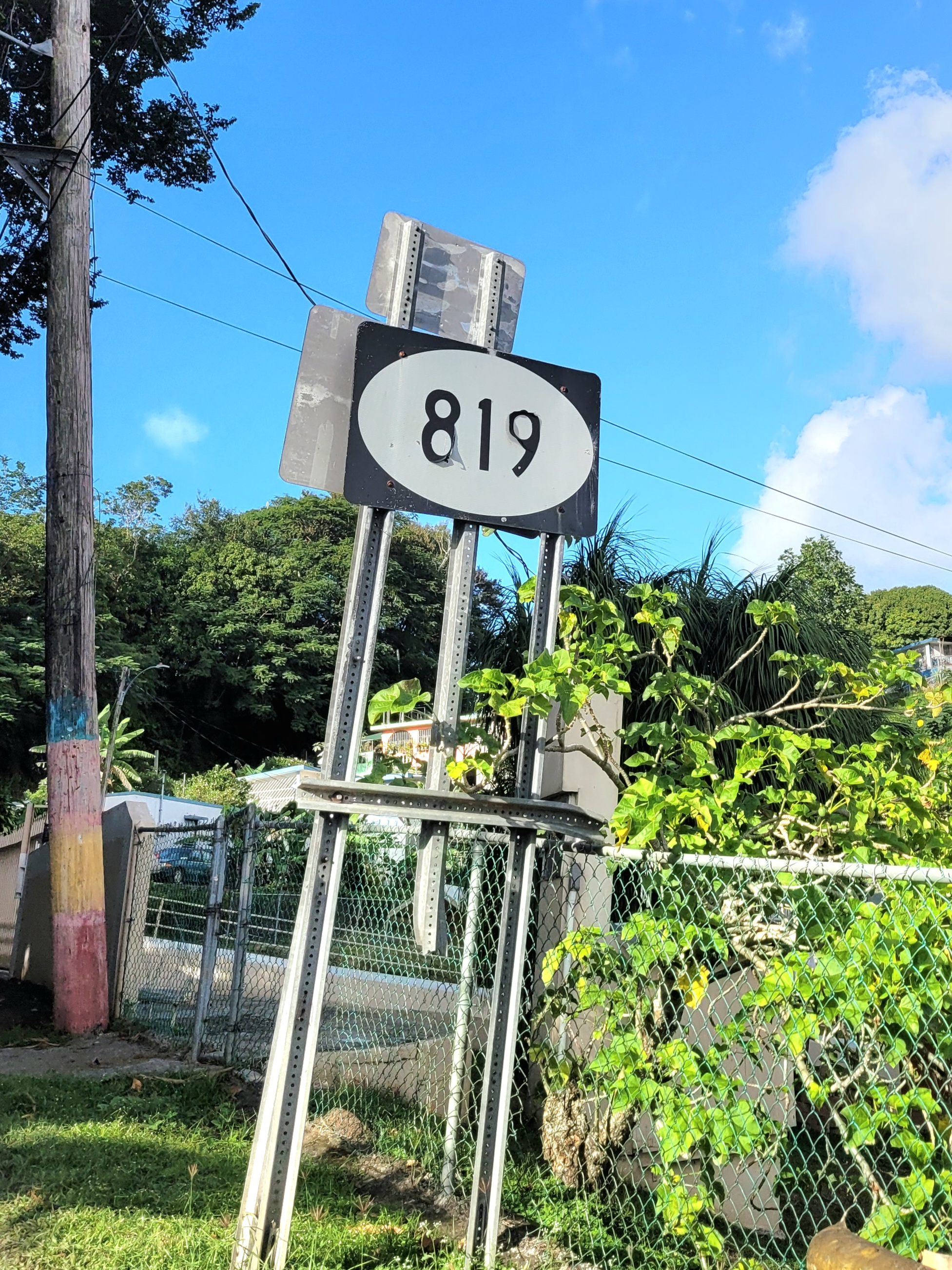
Sign for PR-819 in Mucarabones, Toa Alta, looking north

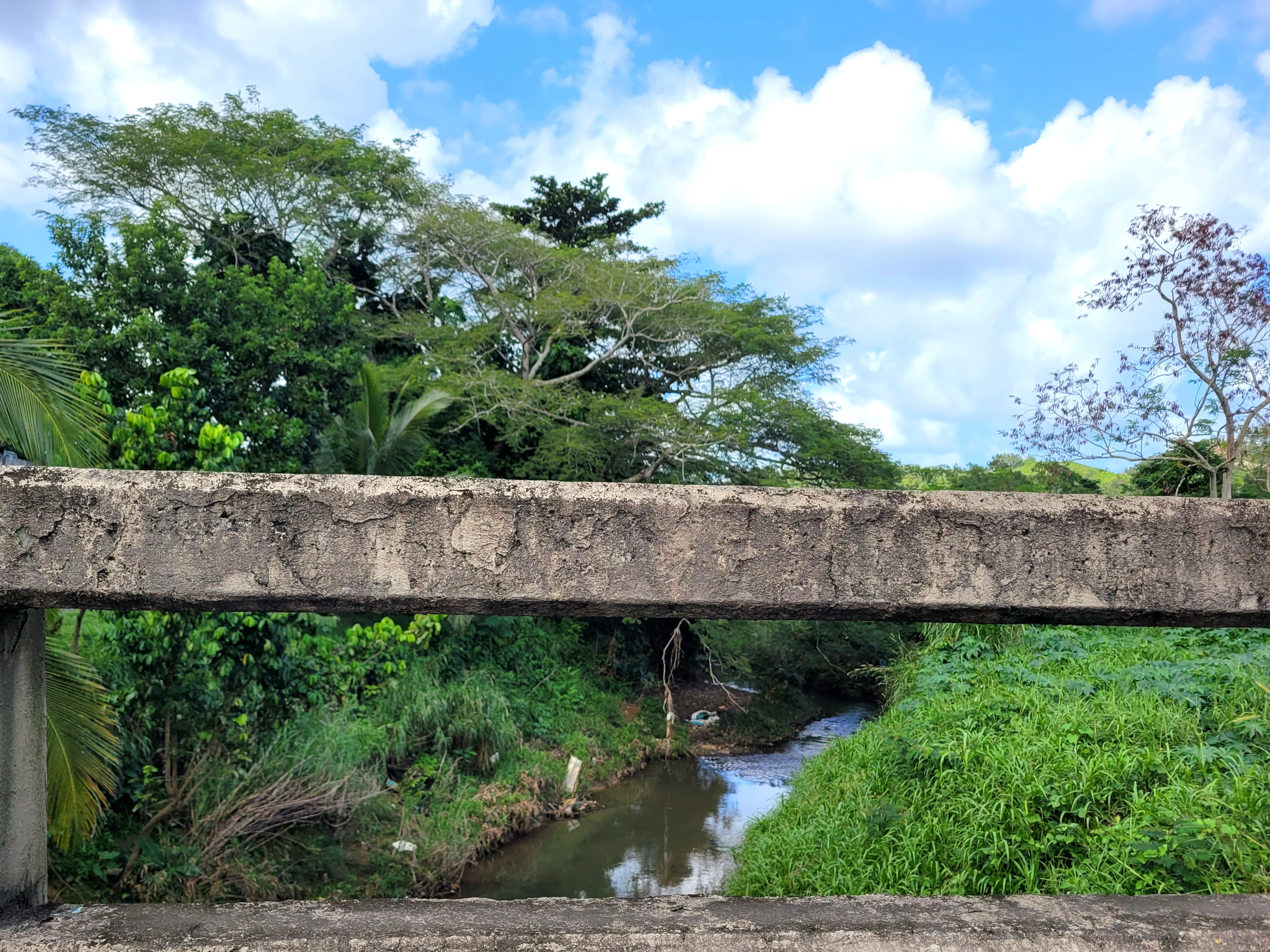
Bucarabones River from PR-819 bridge

== Major intersections ==
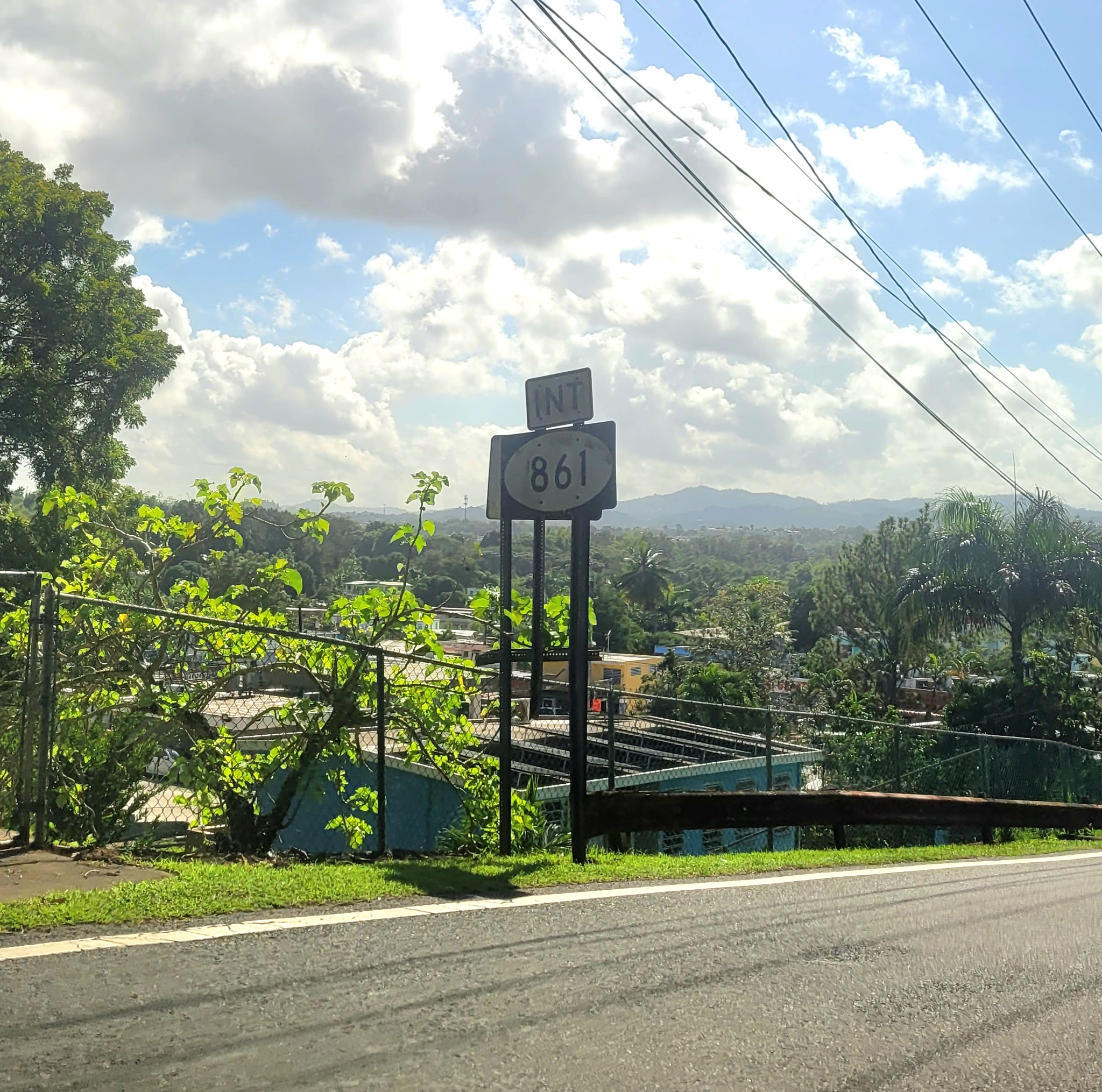
PR-819 south near PR-861 junction in Mucarabones, Toa Alta

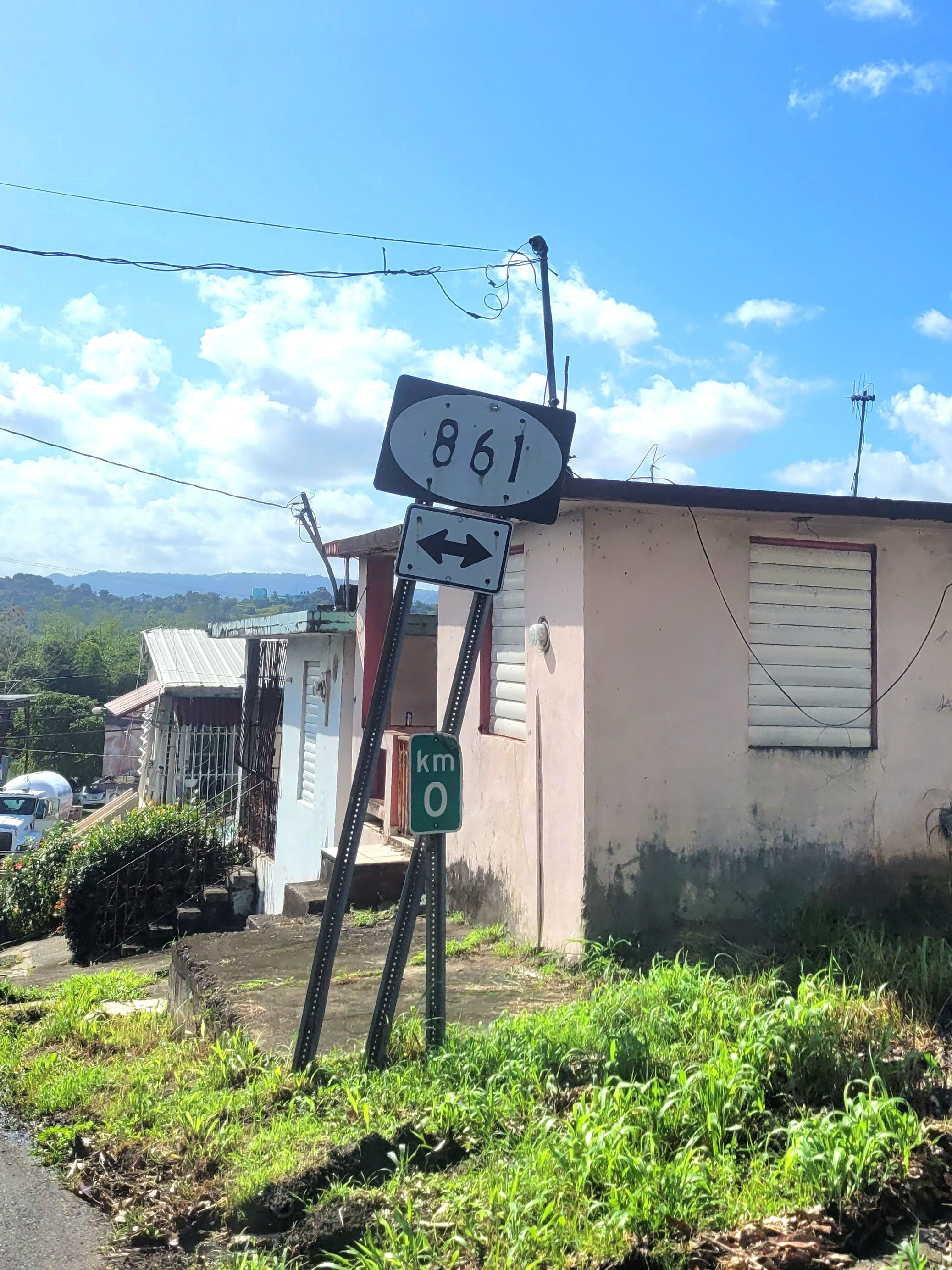
PR-819 south at PR-861 junction in Toa Alta

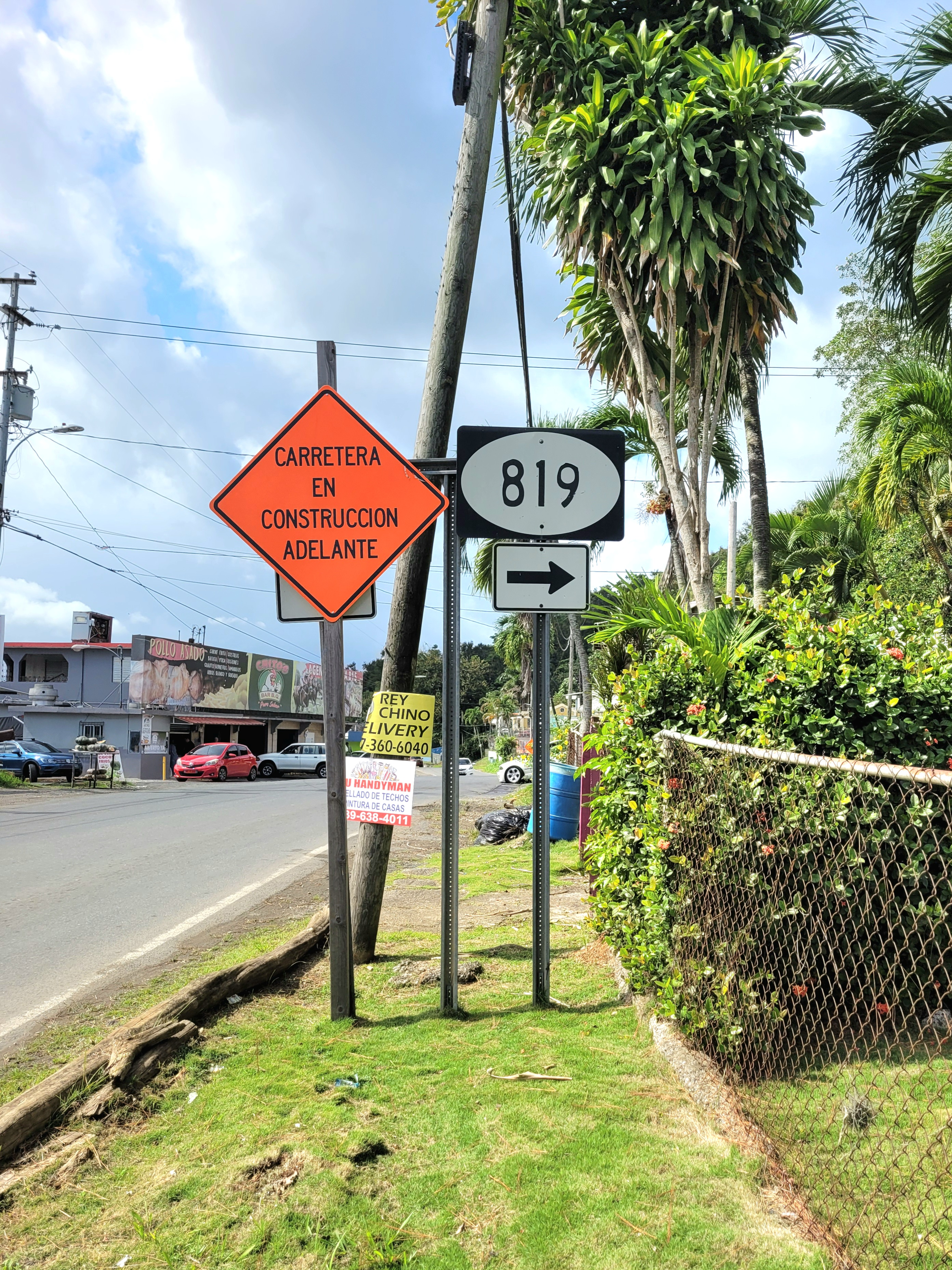
PR-861 west at PR-819 junction in Toa Alta

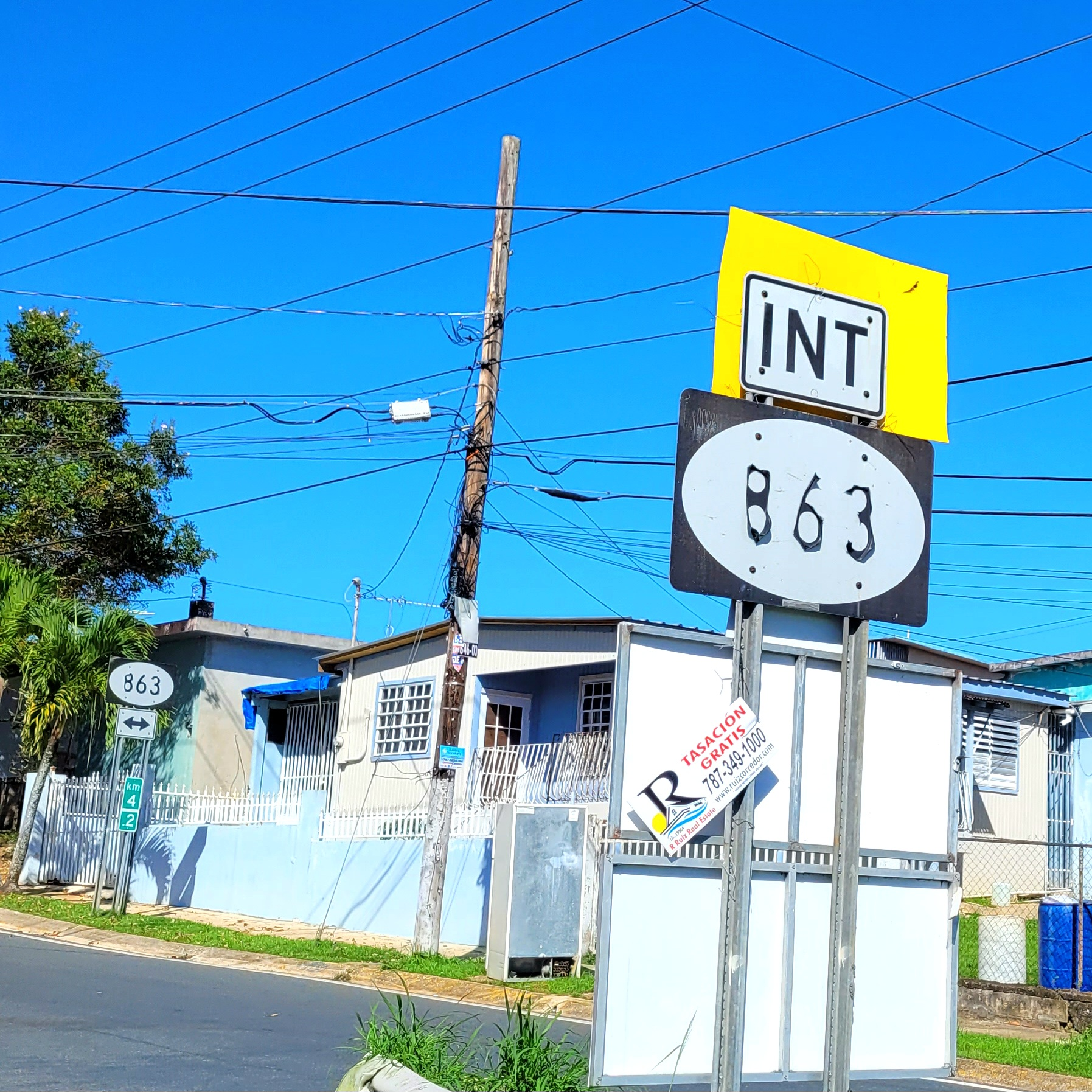
Signs for PR-863 at the northern terminus of PR-819 in Candelaria, Toa Baja

Municipality	Location	km	mi	Destinations	Notes
Toa Alta	Ortíz–Mucarabones line	0.0	0.0	PR-861	Southern terminus of PR-819; access to Toa Alta and Bayamón
Toa Baja	Candelaria	4.2	2.6	PR-863	Northern terminus of PR-819; access to Toa Baja and Bayamón
1.000 mi = 1.609 km; 1.000 km = 0.621 mi
