= Tuzcu =

Tuzcu is a surname. Notable people with the surname include:

- Alper Tuzcu (born 1990), Turkish musician
- Sinan Tuzcu (born 1977), Turkish actor
