= Guachipas Department =

Guachipas
- Department
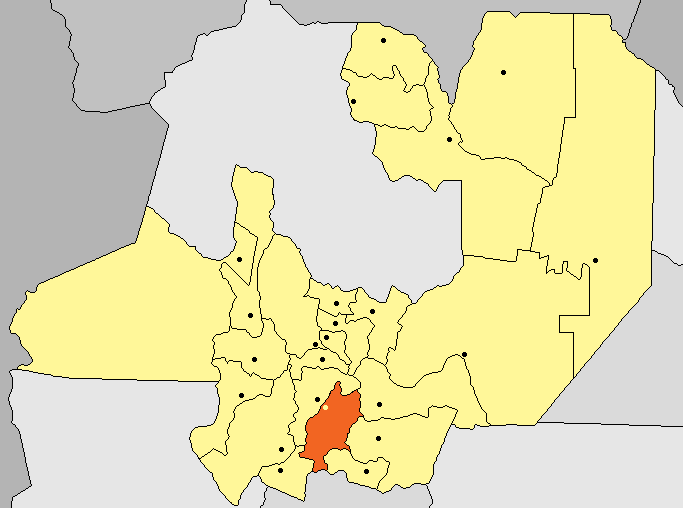
- Country: Argentina
- Province: Salta

Area
  - Total: 2,785 km^{2} (1,075 sq mi)

Population (2010)
  - Total: 3,193
  - Density: 1.146/km^{2} (2.969/sq mi)

Guachipas is a department located in Salta Province, Argentina.

With an area of 2,785 km^{2} (1,075 sq mi) it borders to the north and northeast with Metán Department, to the east with the Departments of La Candelaria and Rosario de la Frontera, to the south with Cafayate and Tucumán Province, and to the west with La Viña Department.

== Towns and municipalities ==
- Guachipas
- Alemania
- Cebilar
- Pampa Grande
- Las Juntas
