= Alper Tuzcu =

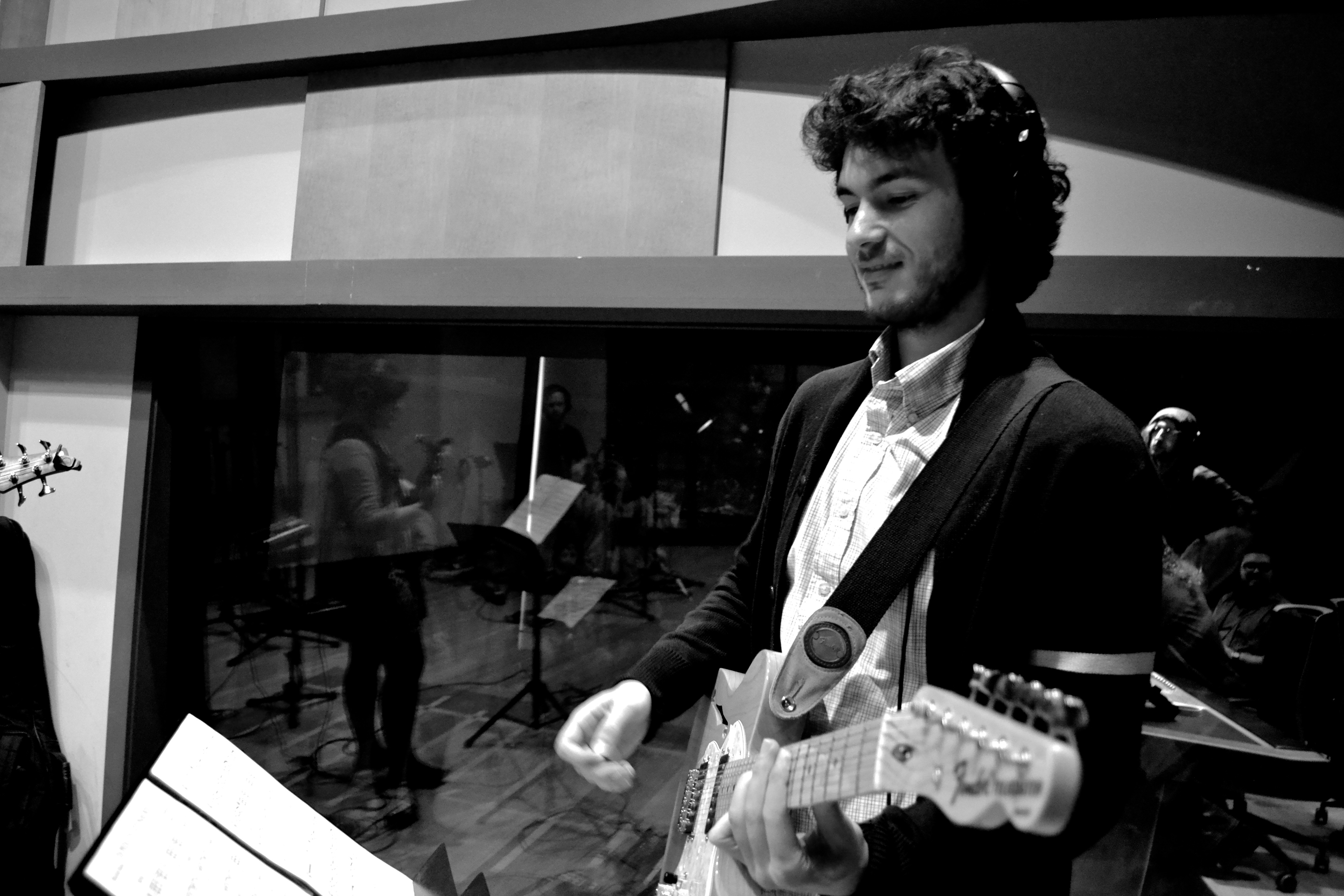
- Alper Tuzcu in València (2014)

Background information
- Born: 1990 (age 35–36); Istanbul, Turkey
- Genres: World music; ethnic electronica; lo-fi; folk; instrumental; Latin jazz; bossa nova; cumbia
- Occupations: Composer; music producer; songwriter; musician; guitarist; educator
- Instruments: Guitar; vocals; bağlama
- Years active: 2014-present
- Website: www.alpertuzcu.com

Alper Tuzcu is a composer, music producer, and guitarist originally from Turkey. Tuzcu has released four albums: El Jardín (2025), Macondo (2021), Aurora (2018), and Between 12 Waters (2016). His music has been featured on NPR, BBC Radio, RTVE, and various international media channels.

Tuzcu is a graduate of Berklee College of Music, where he is currently an assistant professor.

== Career ==
In 2012, Tuzcu performed at Umbria Jazz Festival, where he won the Berklee On The Road scholarship to study full-time at Berklee College of Music in Boston.

In 2014, Tuzcu formed the Brazil-Mediterranean fusion music duo “Aigua” with Brazilian singer Bruna Lucchesi in València, Spain. Between 2014 and 2015, he also recorded twice with Grammy-winner producer Javier Limón (Paco de Lucía, Buika, Chucho Valdés, Bebo Valdés, Mariza, Aynur) in Spain.

In late 2015, he started a duo project called “Ark” with singer and composer Danielle Angeloni. The duo performed at YouBloom Festival in Los Angeles, Sidewalk in New York, and Hard Rock Cafe in Boston. The duo released their first EP, Lately, in 2016. With “Ark,” Tuzcu was featured on "502 Sessions" by Emmy-nominated Dedham TV and WEMF FM, as well as various international media.

Tuzcu's first album, Between 12 Waters, was published by Palma Records in 2016, featuring songs inspired from 12 different cultures around the world. This work features collaborations with vocalists Ganavya and Pia Salvia, among others.

In 2017, Tuzcu released his first EP titled Lines and in 2018, he released his second solo album Aurora, featuring vocalists LASYA, Micaella Cattani, and Kat Kennedy, among other musicians.

The following year, Tuzcu composed and recorded a bossa nova song titled "Felicidade".

In 2020, he released several singles, including a lo-fi song titled "Uzaklarda," which made it to Spotify’s editorial playlist “Turkey Viral 50.” That same year, Tuzcu also released two EPs, Migrante and Imagina, which were the first two parts of a larger project consisting in an EP trilogy. On his 2020 EP, Migrante, Tuzcu composed music for a poem by Chilean poet Pablo Neruda, called "Con Ella."

Tuzcu's EP Raíz, the final part of the trilogy, came out in 2021, featuring a collaboration with the percussionist of Snarky Puppy, Marcelo Woloski. This EP was selected as one of the Top 10 EPs of 2021 by NPR-affiliate Latin Alt HD3, and one of the songs on this EP, "Afortunado," was selected for the NPR show World Cafe’s Best of 2021 LatinX playlist. A full length album compiling all three EPs, titled Macondo, was released the same year.

Between 2022 and 2023, Tuzcu released several singles, including a collaboration with Uruguayan-Canadian singer Gisun, "Tramuntana" featuring LASYA on bansuri and Tuzcu himself on bağlama, a lo-fi track with South American folkloric influences titled "La Cordillera," and "Espírito," which mixes Brazilian samba and Uruguayan candombe rhythms.

In 2025, Tuzcu has released his fourth album El Jardín featuring collaborators such as Maria Rodés and Ana Rossi. The album got featured in editorial Spotify playlists such as "Cancioneros" and "New Music Friday Spain".

== Discography ==
=== Albums and EPs ===
- El Jardín (2025) (Morning View Music)
- Macondo (2021) (Palma Records)
- Raíz (2021) (Palma Records)
- Imagina (2020) (Palma Records)
- Migrante (2020) (Palma Records)
- Aurora (2018) (Palma Records)
- Lines (2017) (Palma Records)
- Between 12 Waters (2016) (Palma Records)

=== Singles ===
- "Déjame al Mar" (2025)
- "Recuerdo de Jacarandas" (2024)
- "Şehir Akşam ve Sen" (2023)
- "La Cordillera" (2023)
- "Espírito" (2023)
- "Tramuntana" (2022)
- "Azul" (2021)
- "Uç" (2020)
- "My Life Is Going On" (2020)
- "Uzaklarda" (2020)
- "Felicidade" (2019)
- "Morning View" (2019)
- "Guide Me Away (Instrumental)" (2019)
- "Joga" (2018)

=== Collaborations ===
- "Ancla" with Gisun (2022)
- "Singing In My Own Key" with Valerie Giglio (2017) (Forza Press)
- "Lately" by Ark (Alper Tuzcu and Danielle Angeloni) (2016)
