= Puerto Rico Highway 864 =

Highway in Puerto Rico

Highway 864
- Ruta 864

Route information
- Maintained by Puerto Rico DTPW
- Length: 2.1 km (1.3 mi)

Major junctions
- West end: PR-2 in Hato Tejas
- PR-862 in Hato Tejas
- East end: PR-2 in Hato Tejas

Location
- Country: United States
- Territory: Puerto Rico
- Municipalities: Bayamón

Highway system
- Roads in Puerto Rico; List
← PR-863	→ PR-866

Puerto Rico Highway 864 (PR-864) is an east–west road located in the municipality of Bayamón in Puerto Rico. Located south of PR-2, the entire road is located in Hato Tejas barrio and is 2.1 km (1.3 mi) in length. This route intersects with PR-2 at its eastern and western termini.

== Route description ==
Puerto Rico Highway 864 has a single lane per direction in the entire length and provides access to several neighborhoods of the western area of Bayamón. It begins at PR-2 in western Hato Tejas barrio and heads to the east, where meets with PR-862. After PR-862 intersection, PR-864 continues to the east, passing through few neighborhoods until its end at PR-2 in eastern Hato Tejas.

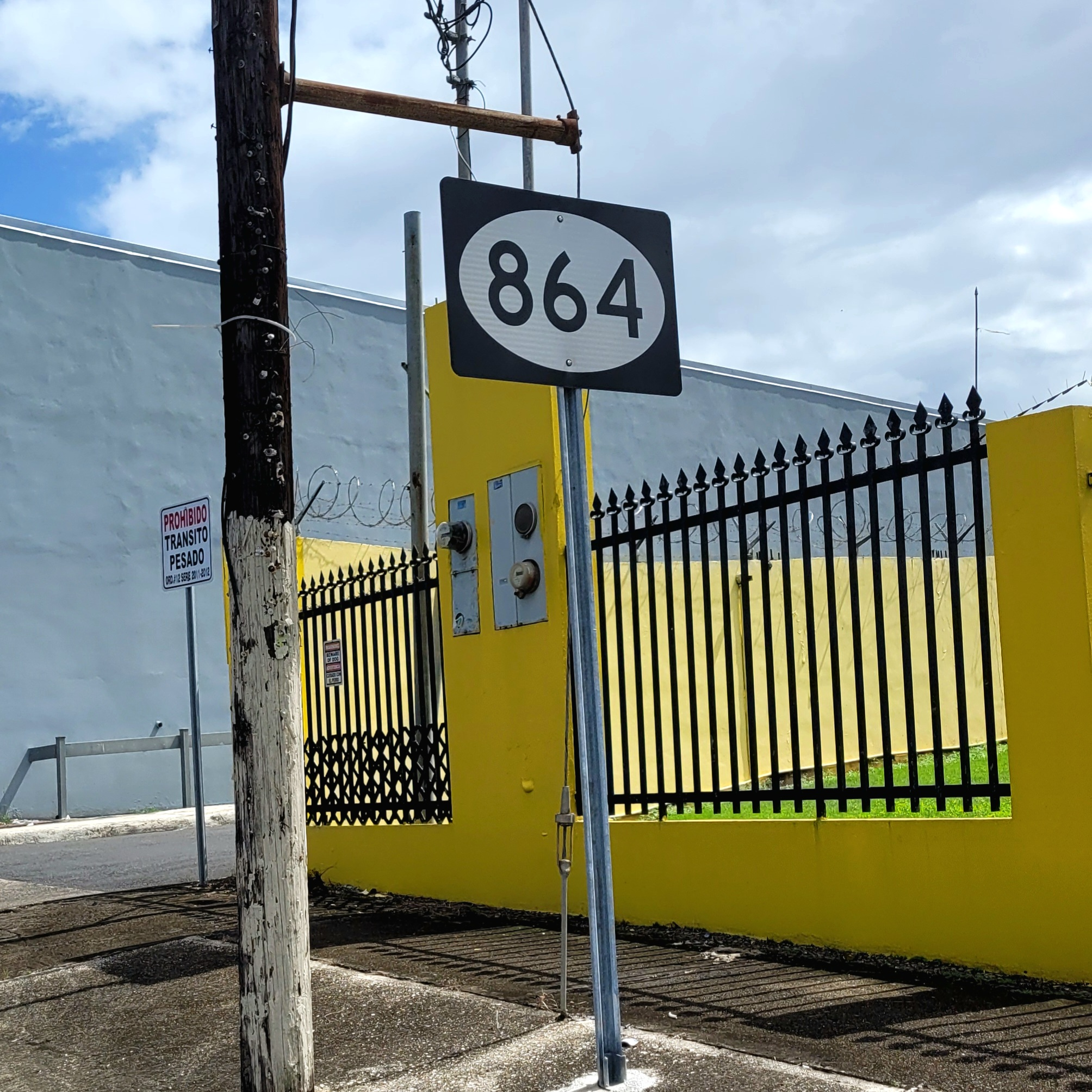
Sign for PR-864 in Hato Tejas barrio, looking east

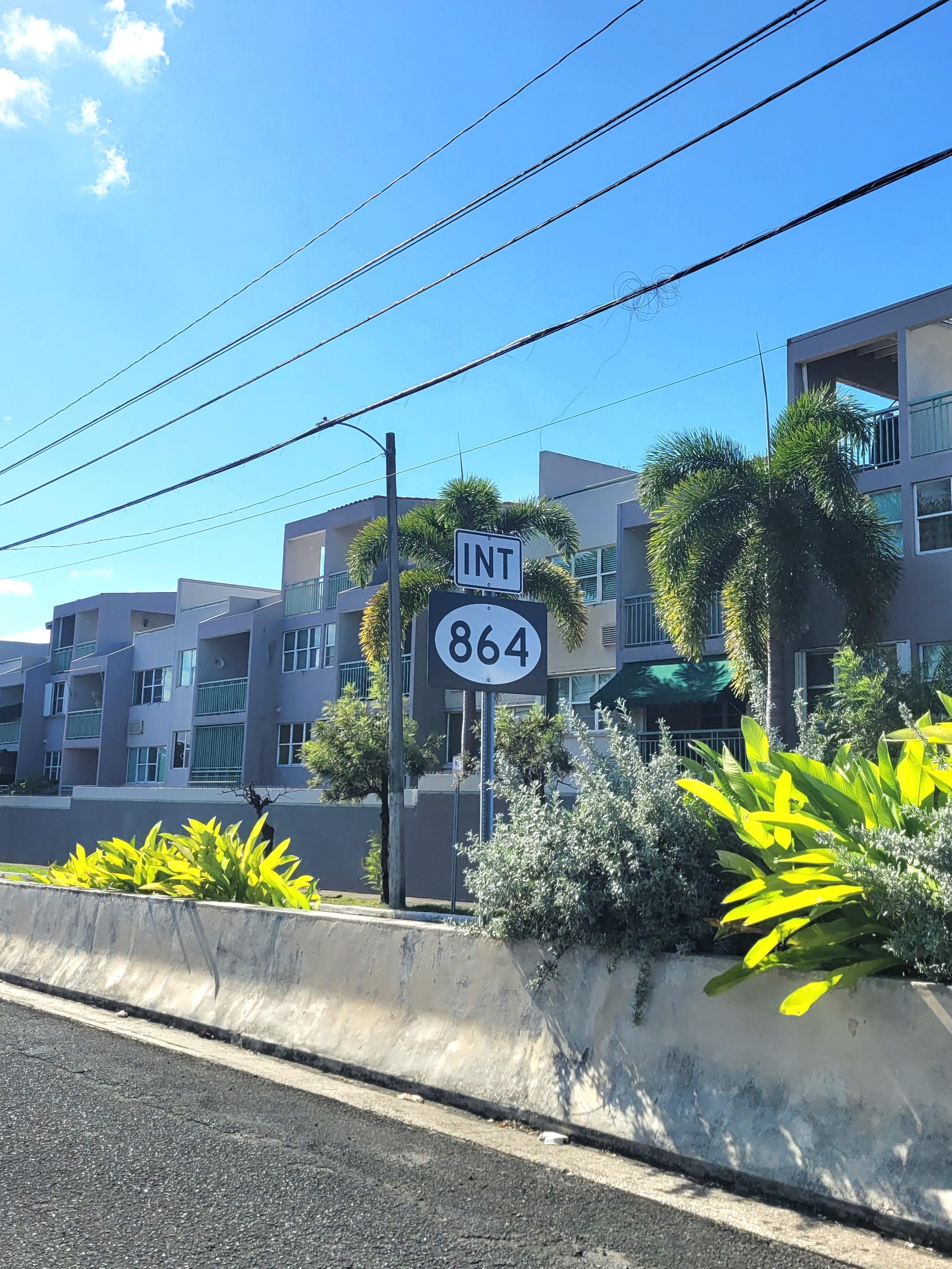
PR-2 west near PR-864 intersection in Hato Tejas barrio

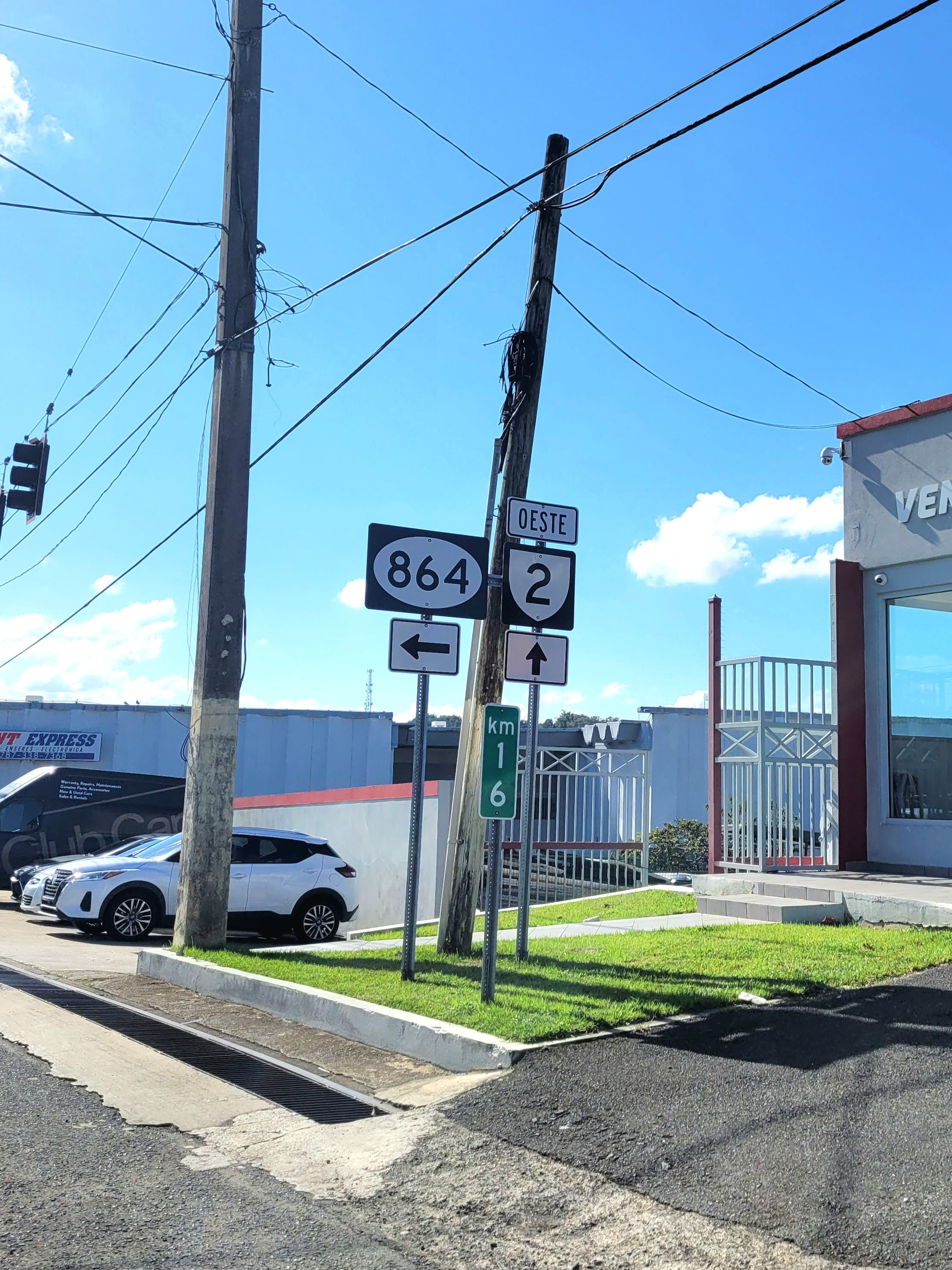
PR-2 west at PR-864 intersection in Hato Tejas barrio

== History ==
Before its current numerical designation, the entire length of PR-864 belonged to an original segment of PR-2 prior to its current deviation and widening. The current numerical designation corresponds to the 1953 Puerto Rico highway renumbering, a process implemented by the Puerto Rico Department of Transportation and Public Works (Spanish: Departamento de Transportación y Obras Públicas) that increased the insular highway network to connect existing routes with different locations around Puerto Rico.

== Major intersections ==
The entire route is located in Hato Tejas, Bayamón.

km	mi	Destinations	Notes
0.0	0.0	PR-2	Western terminus of PR-864; access to Toa Baja, Arecibo and San Juan
0.4	0.25	PR-862	Northern terminus of PR-862
2.1	1.3	PR-2 east	Eastern terminus of PR-864; PR-2 east exit and entrance; access to Bayamón and San Juan
1.000 mi = 1.609 km; 1.000 km = 0.621 mi: Incomplete access
