= When I Was Puerto Rican =

1993 autobiography by Esmeralda Santiago

- First edition
- Author: Esmeralda Santiago
- Language: English
- Genre: Autobiography, Biography
- Publisher: Da Capo Press
- Publication date: 1993
- Publication place: United States
- Media type: Print (Paperback)
- Pages: 278 pp
- ISBN: 0679756760

When I Was Puerto Rican is a 1993 autobiography written by Puerto Rican native Esmeralda Santiago. It is the first of three installments, followed by Almost a Woman and The Turkish Lover. This first book begins by describing Santiago's life in Macún, a sector of Candelaria barrio in Toa Baja, Puerto Rico. It details the circumstances that led to her mother bringing her and her siblings to New York. The second part of the book describes Santiago's initial adjustment to life in America. The memoir closes with Santiago's audition to New York's Performing Arts High School.

== Plot summary ==
Esmeralda Santiago is the oldest child her parents have together, although her father has an older daughter she doesn't know about. Her parents' relationship is damaged as her mother suspects her father is having an affair. Amid the drama, one of Esmeralda's siblings, Raymond, gets badly injured in a bicycle accident. Esmeralda's mother decides to move to New York, where she believes the doctors can provide better care for Raymond. In New York, which is filled with challenges for a new family to live easily, Santiago experiences the difficulties of racism and learning a new language. She feels humiliated when her mother, who speaks very little English, brings her to the welfare center to help fill out forms and speak with the social workers. Although life at school is difficult for the siblings, their mother insists that they study so they do not have to work in a factory like she does. The first installment in Santiago's biography closes with her audition to Performing Arts High School, an institution offering specialized instruction in dance, theater and cinema.

== Critical reception ==
When I Was Puerto Rican was positively reviewed, with Kirkus Reviews calling it "epic in its own way" and Publishers Weekly describing it as "artful".

== Relevance ==
According to the 2010 United States census, there are 4,623,716 Puerto Rican Americans. The United States Census Bureau website states that in 2011 there were around 52 million Hispanic and Latino Americans. Santiago's autobiographies describe the complex process of finding an identity as a member of two different cultures.

== Editions ==
Santiago's book is available in paperback, ebook, audiobook, Spanish paperback, and Spanish audiobook editions.
