= Guachipas =

- Municipality and village
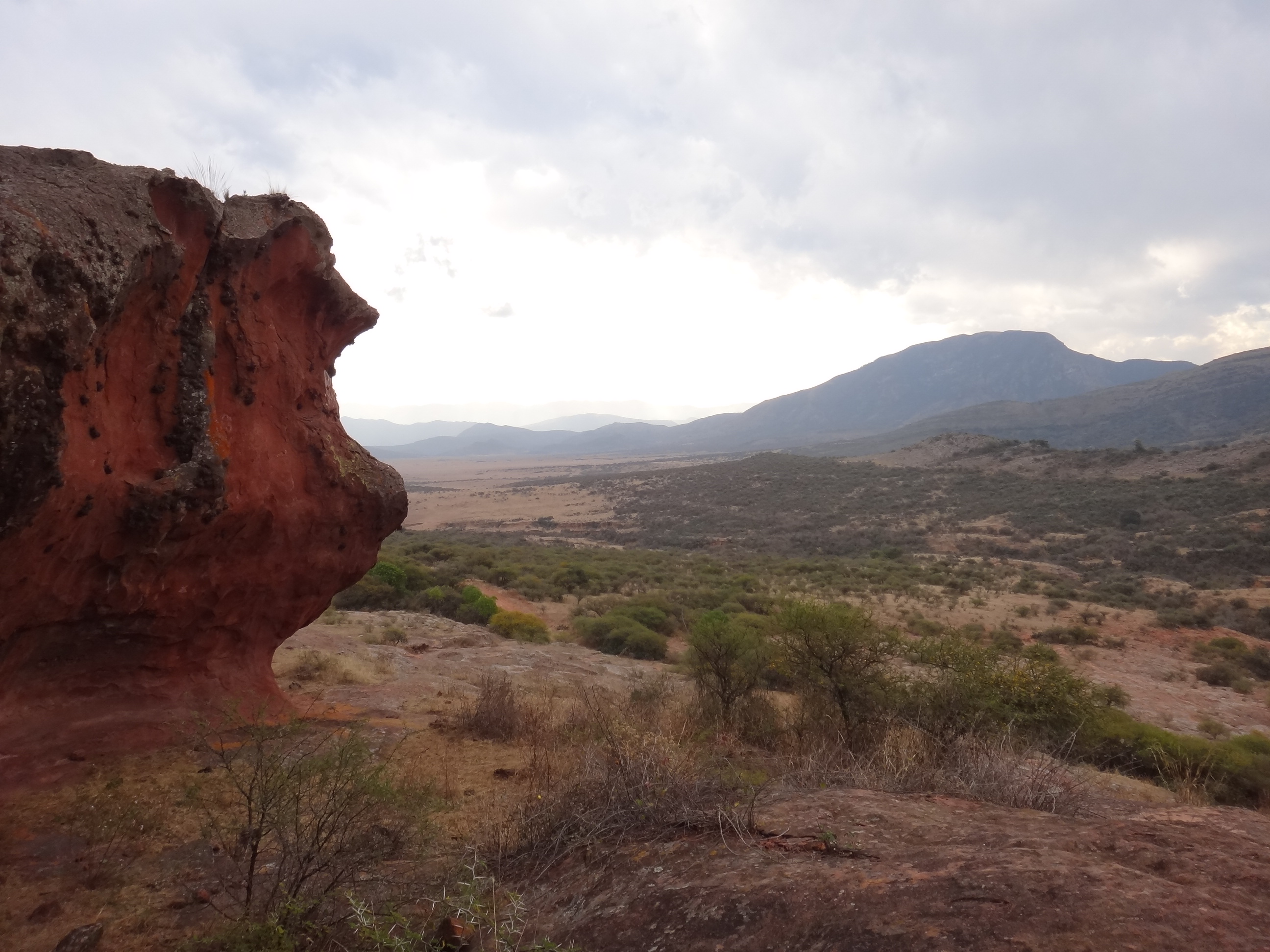

- Location within Salta Province Location within Argentina
- Country: Argentina
- Province: Salta
- Department: Guachipas
- Time zone: UTC−3 (ART)
- Climate: BSk

Guachipas is a village and rural municipality in Salta Province in northwestern Argentina.
