= Candelario (disambiguation) =

Candelario is a municipality in the province of Salamanca, Castile and León, Spain.

Candelario may also refer to:

== Surname ==
- Alex Candelario (born 1975), American cyclist
- Alexis Candelario Santana (born 1972), Puerto Rican convicted criminal and former leader of a drug cartel
- Claro Candelario (fl. 1940s – 1960s), Filipino labor leader
- Felicia Candelario (born 1961), Dominican Republic sprinter
- Guillermina Candelario (born 1979), female weightlifter from the Dominican Republic
- Jeimer Candelario (born 1993), American MLB player
- Kevin Candelario (born 1994), American drag queen
- Moisés Candelario (born 1978), Ecuadorian footballer

== Given name ==
- Candelario Duvergel (1963–2016), amateur boxer from Cuba
- Candelario Garcia (1944–2013), recipient of the U.S. Medal of Honor
- Candelario Huízar (1882–1970), Mexican composer and music teacher

== Places ==
- Candelario Mancilla, a small settlement in the Aysén Region of southern Chile

== See also ==
- Candelaria (disambiguation)
