= Hato Tejas, Bayamón, Puerto Rico =

Barrio of Puerto Rico

Hato Tejas
- Barrio
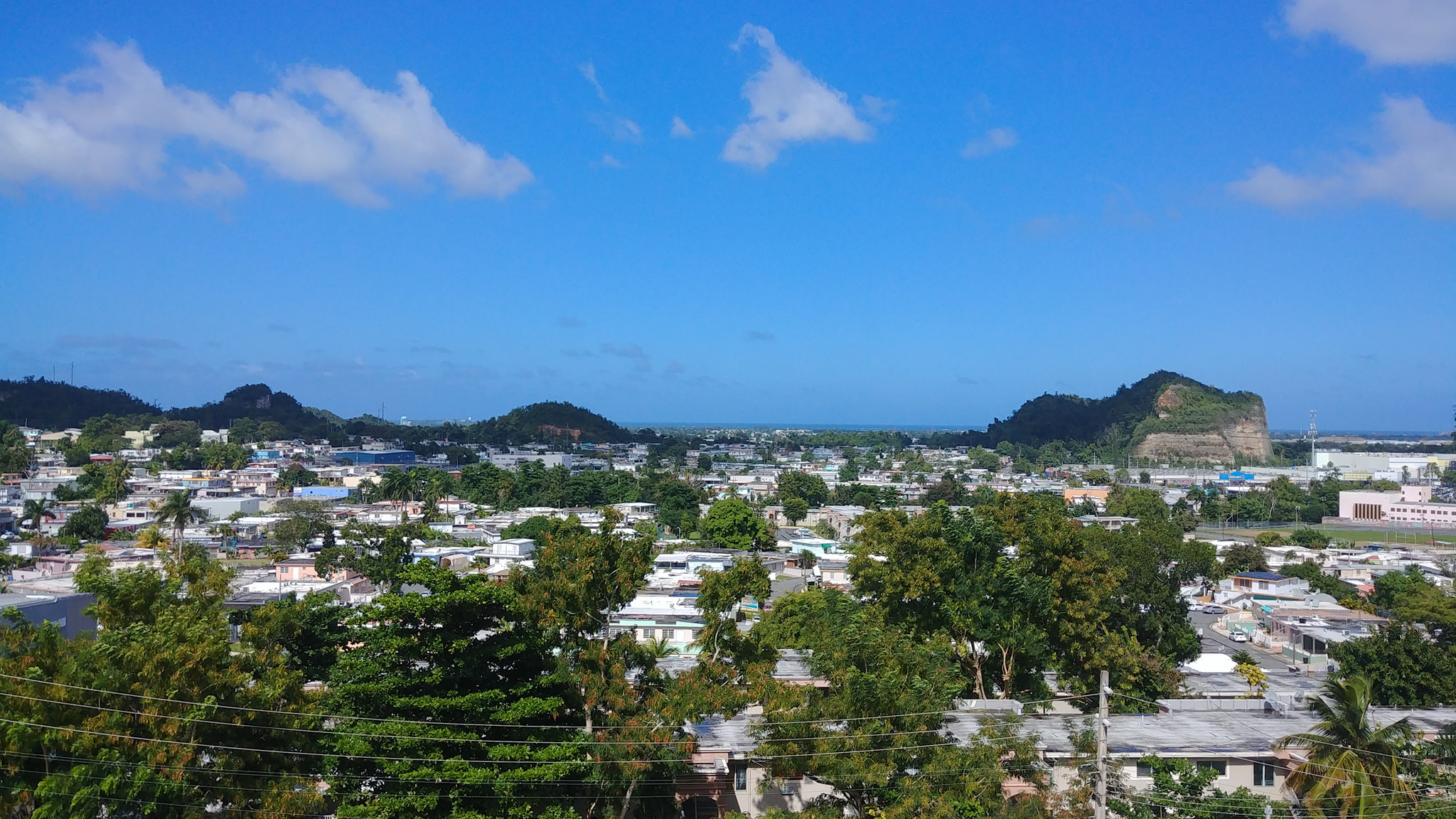
- Looking north from Hato Tejas

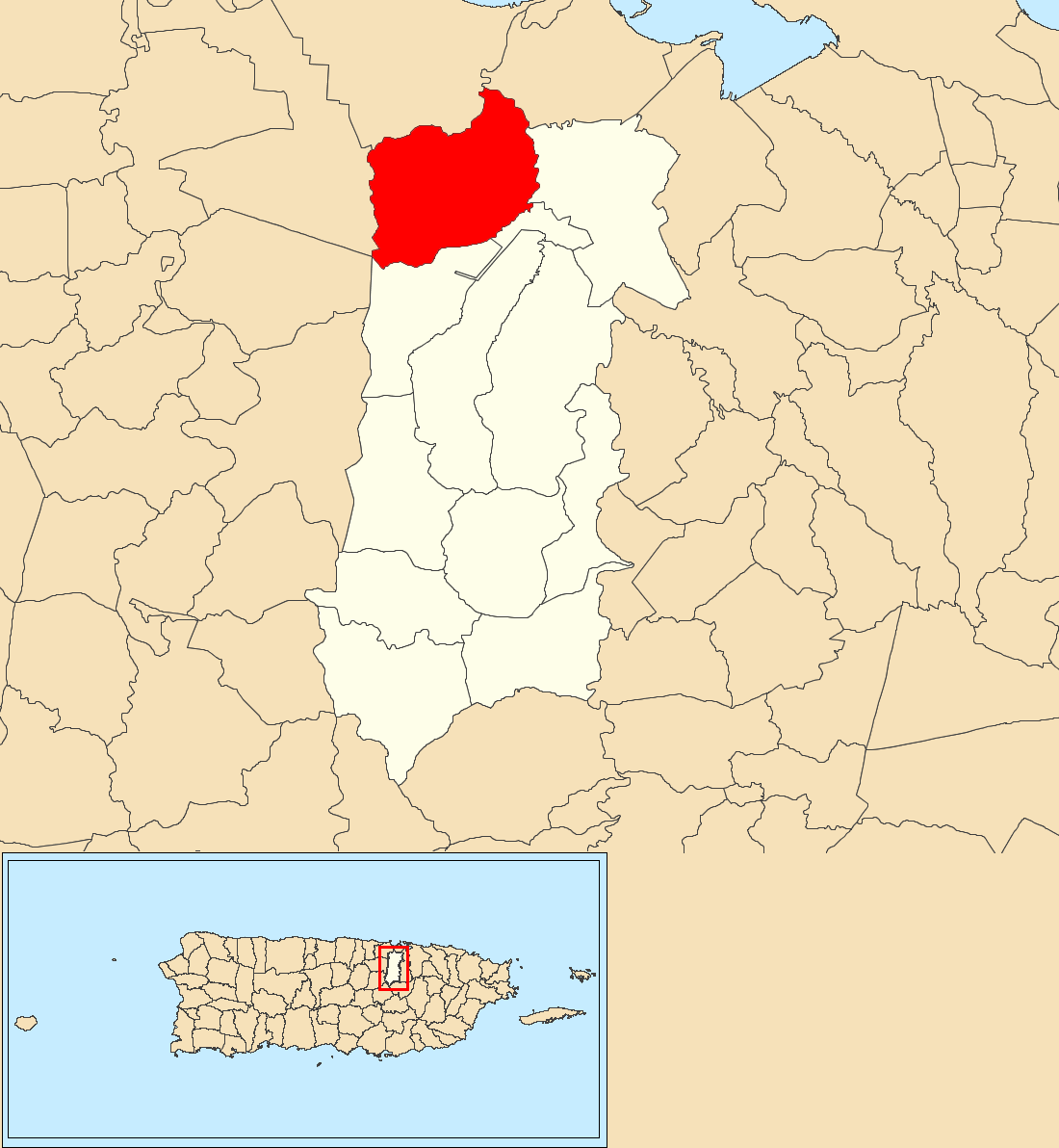
- Location of Hato Tejas within the municipality of Bayamón shown in red

- Location of Puerto Rico
- Coordinates: 18°24′31″N 66°10′40″W
- Commonwealth: Puerto Rico
- Municipality: Bayamón

Area
  - Total: 5.46 sq mi (14.1 km^{2})
  - Land: 5.46 sq mi (14.1 km^{2})
  - Water: 0.00 sq mi (0 km^{2})
- Elevation: 226 ft (69 m)

Population (2010)
  - Total: 41,851
  - Density: 3,211.7/sq mi (1,240.0/km^{2})
- Source: 2010 Census
- Time zone: UTC−4 (AST)

Hato Tejas is a barrio in the municipality of Bayamón, Puerto Rico. Its population in 2010 was 41,851.

== History ==
Hato Tejas was in Spain's gazetteers until Puerto Rico was ceded by Spain in the aftermath of the Spanish–American War under the terms of the Treaty of Paris of 1898 and became an unincorporated territory of the United States. In 1899, the United States Department of War conducted a census of Puerto Rico finding that the population of Hato Tejas barrio was 1,358.

Historical population
Census	Pop.	Note	%±
1900	1,358		—
1910	1,904		40.2%
1920	2,169		13.9%
1930	3,092		42.6%
1940	4,758		53.9%
1950	6,514		36.9%
1960	11,427		75.4%
1970	0		−100.0%
1980	44,079		—
1990	47,051		6.7%
2000	46,528		−1.1%
2010	41,851		−10.1%
U.S. Decennial Census; 1899 (shown as 1900) 1910-1930; 1930-1950 1980-2000 2010

== Gallery ==
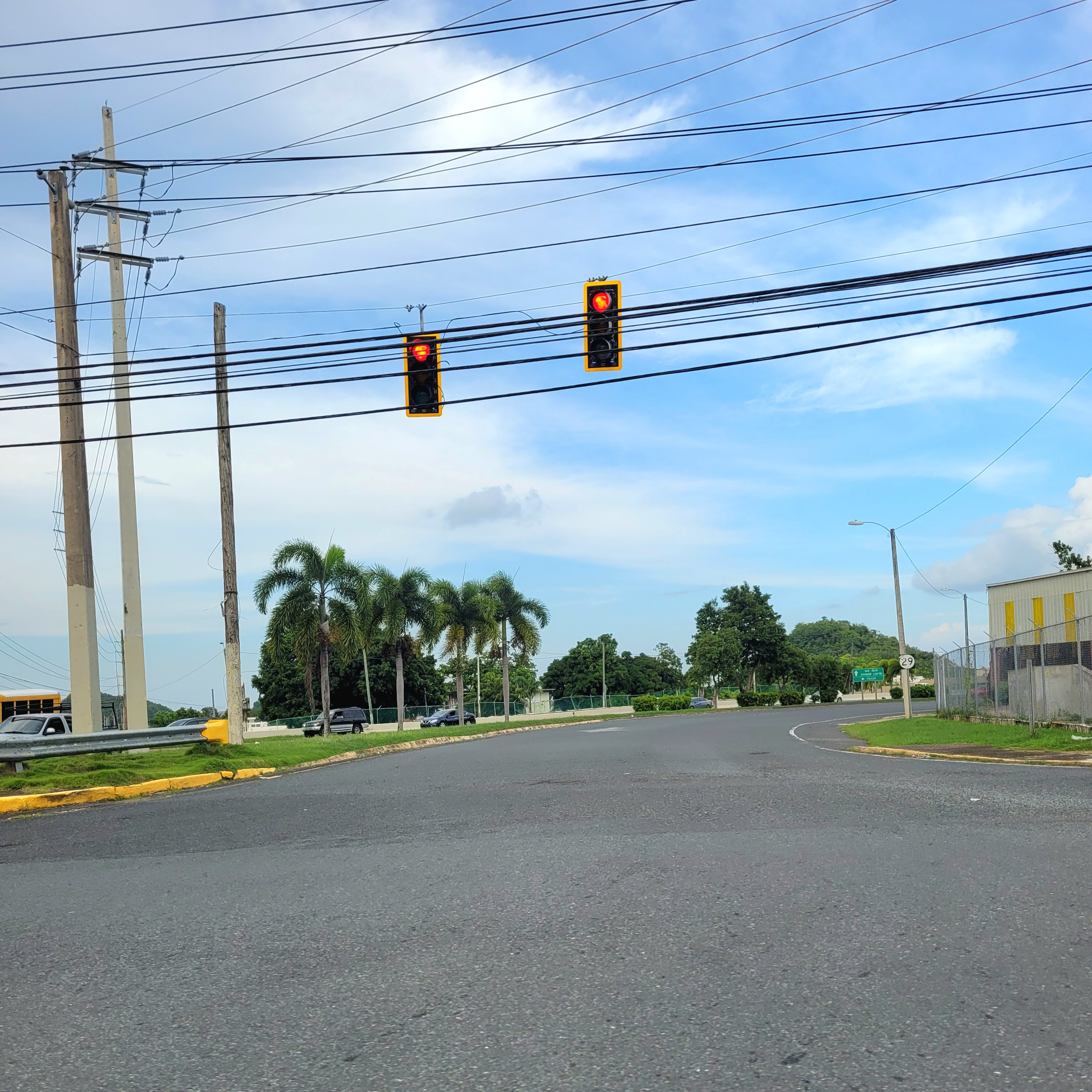
Puerto Rico Highway 29 in Hato Tejas

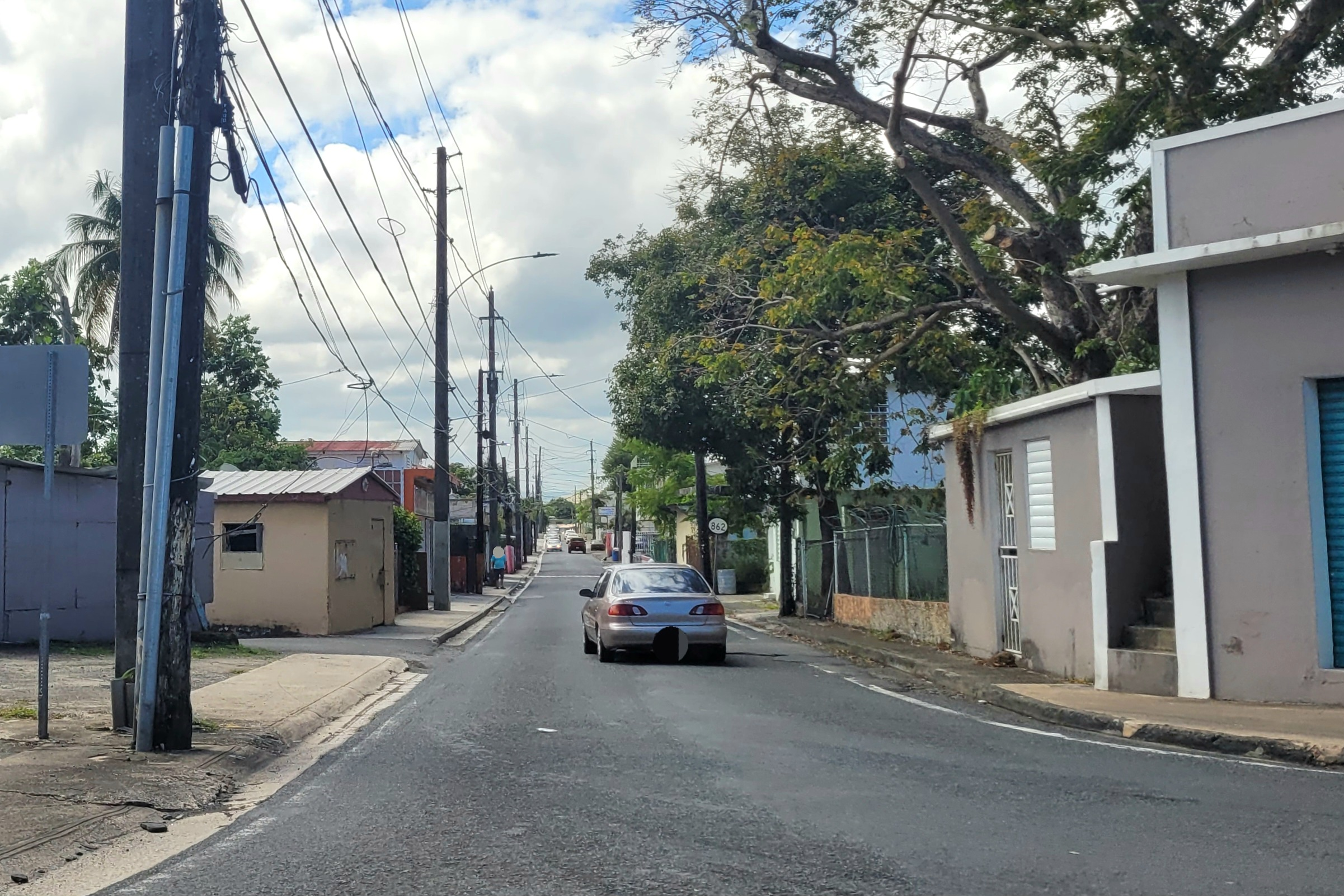
Puerto Rico Highway 862 in Hato Tejas

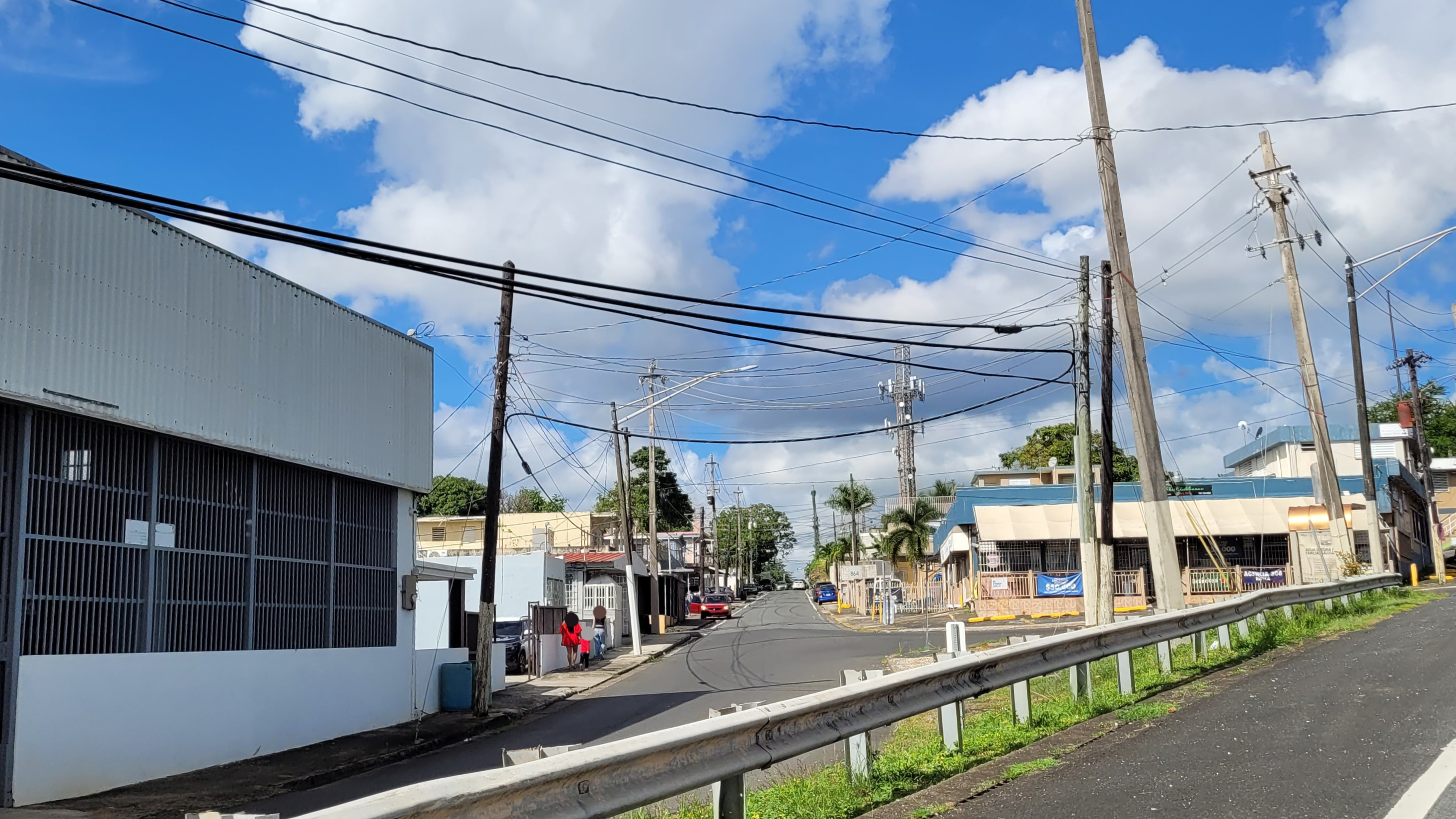
Puerto Rico Highway 864 in Hato Tejas

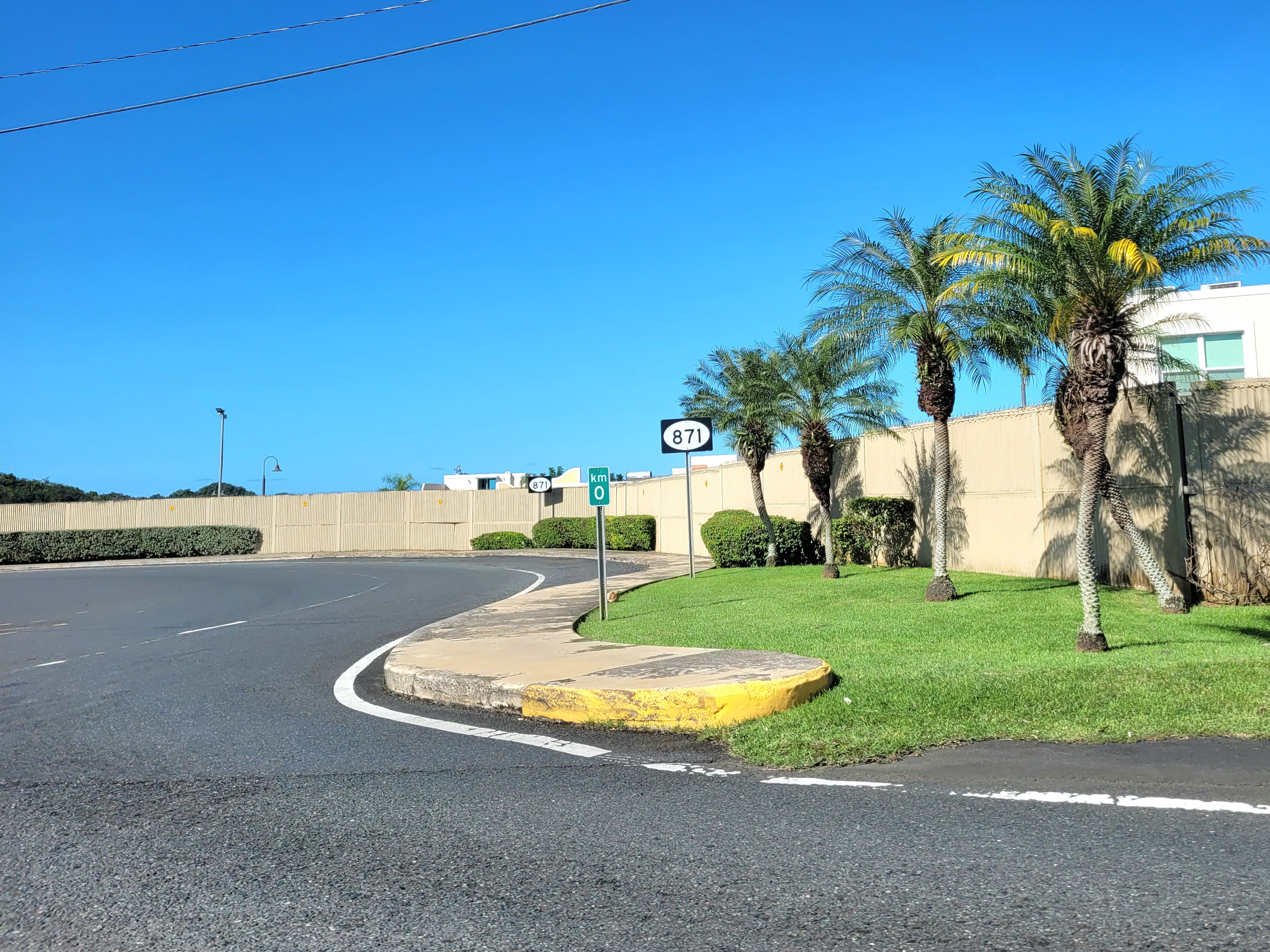
Puerto Rico Highway 871 in Hato Tejas

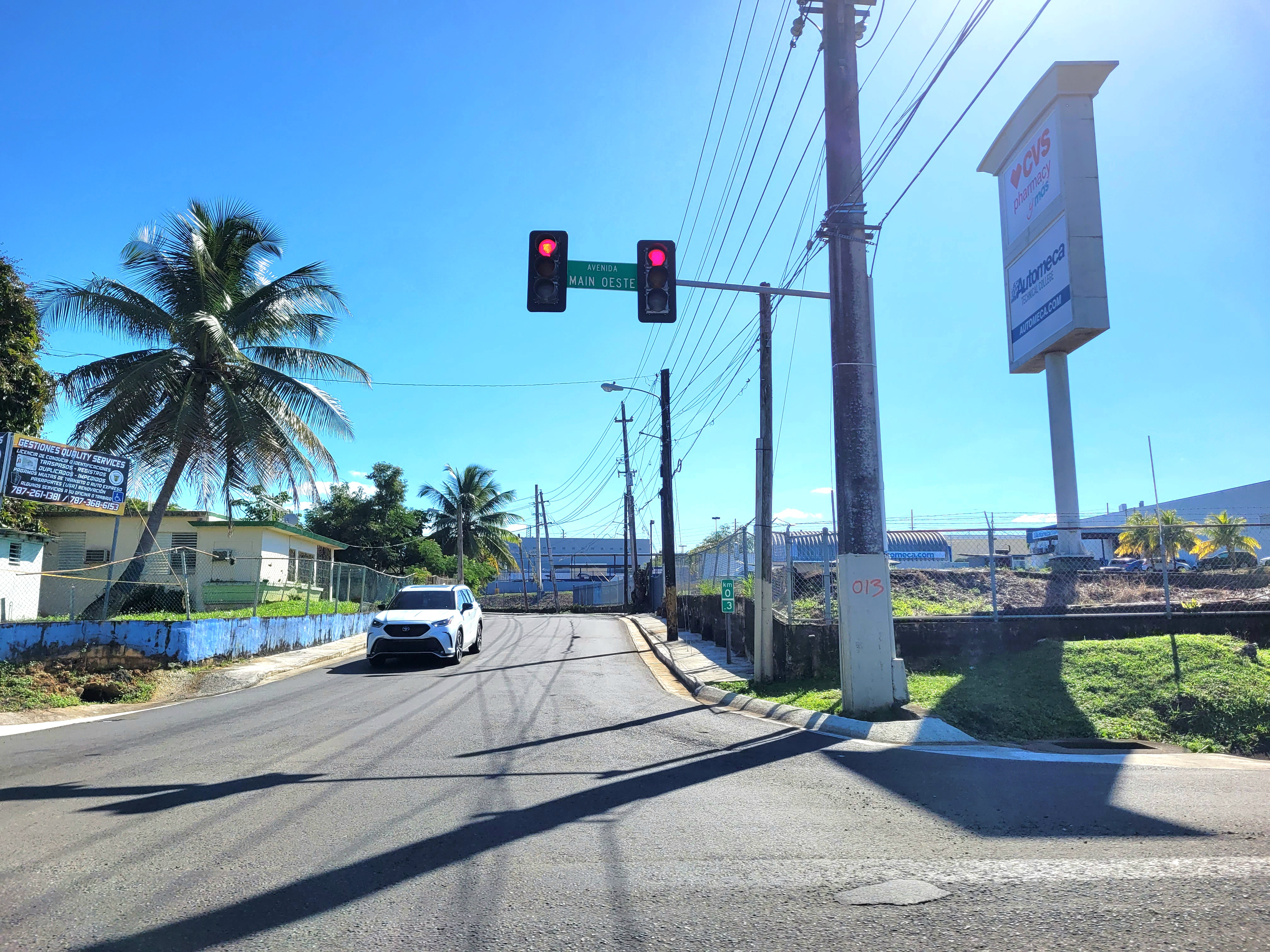
Puerto Rico Highway 872 in Hato Tejas

== See also ==
- List of communities in Puerto Rico
