= El Tala =

Coordinates: 26°07′S 65°17′W

- Municipality and town
- Interactive map of El Tala
- Country: Argentina
- Province: Salta Province
- Time zone: UTC−3 (ART)

El Tala is a town and municipality in Salta Province in northwestern Argentina.
