= Pájaros, Bayamón, Puerto Rico =

Barrio of Puerto Rico

Pájaros
- Barrio
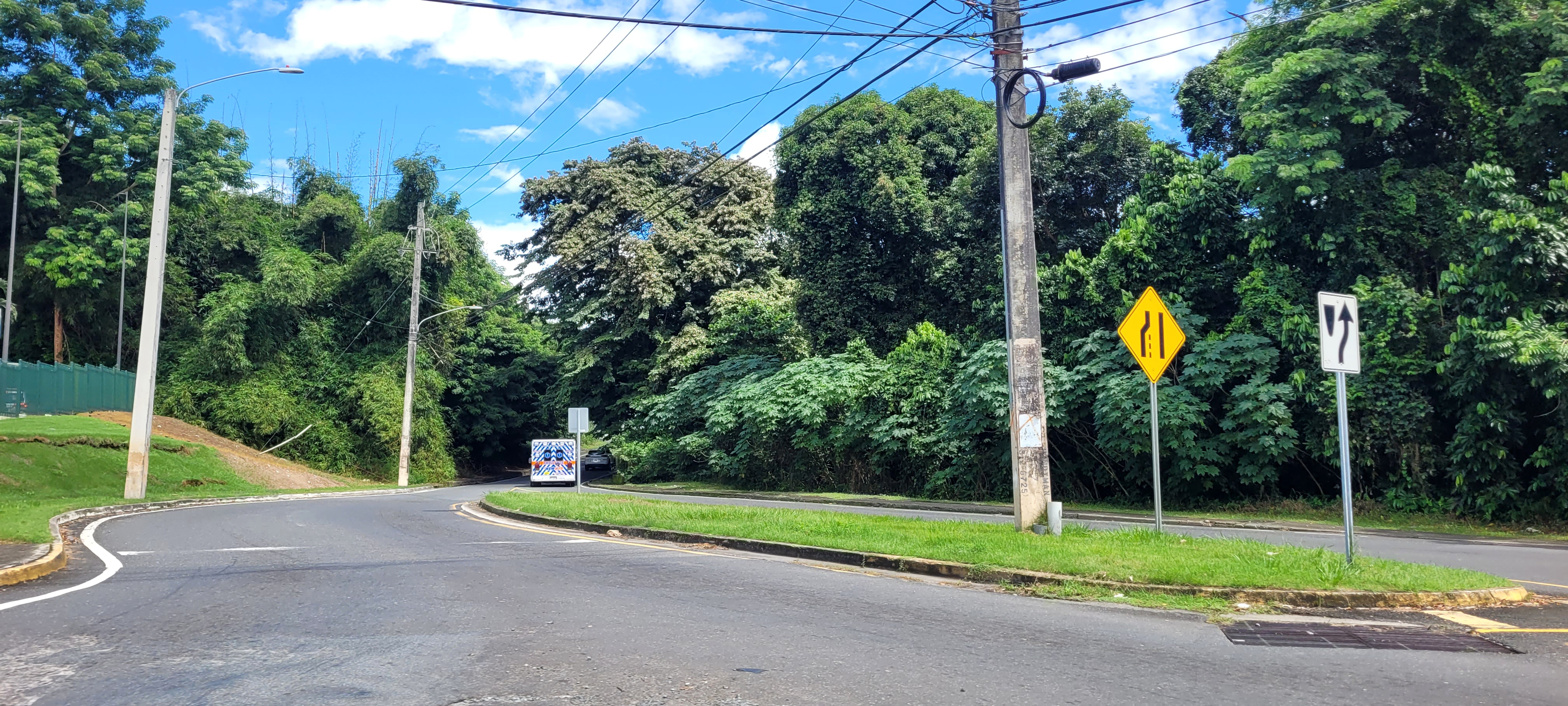
- Puerto Rico Highway 861 in Pájaros

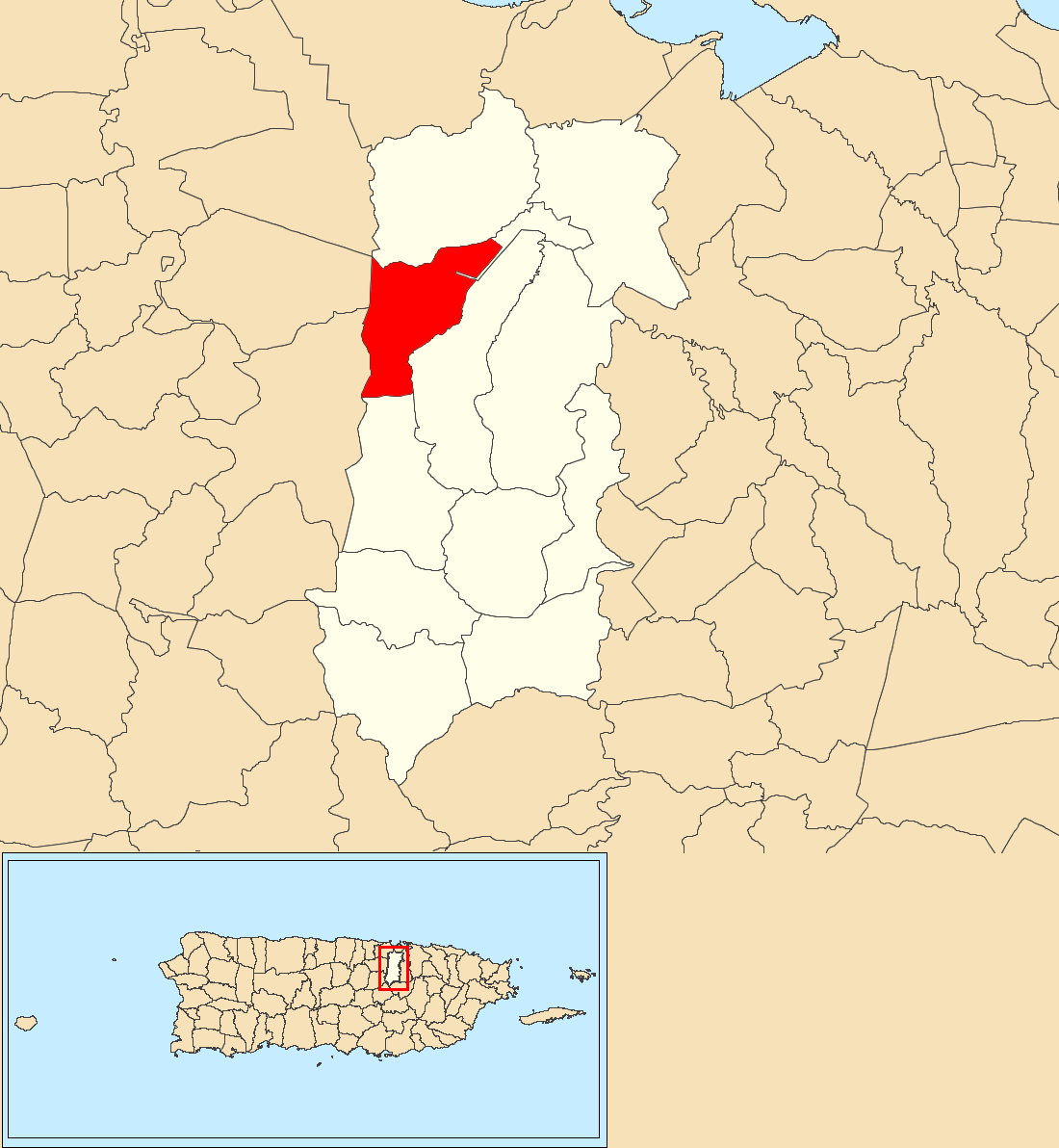
- Location of Pájaros within the municipality of Bayamón shown in red

- Location of Puerto Rico
- Coordinates: 18°22′35″N 66°11′11″W
- Commonwealth: Puerto Rico
- Municipality: Bayamón

Area
  - Total: 3.02 sq mi (7.8 km^{2})
  - Land: 3.02 sq mi (7.8 km^{2})
  - Water: 0.00 sq mi (0 km^{2})
- Elevation: 98 ft (30 m)

Population (2010)
  - Total: 30,194
  - Density: 4,048.3/sq mi (1,563.1/km^{2})
- Source: 2010 Census
- Time zone: UTC−4 (AST)

Pájaros is a barrio in the municipality of Bayamón, Puerto Rico. Its population in 2010 was 30,194.

== History ==
Pájaros was in Spain's gazetteers until Puerto Rico was ceded by Spain in the aftermath of the Spanish–American War under the terms of the Treaty of Paris of 1898 and became an unincorporated territory of the United States. In 1899, the United States Department of War conducted a census of Puerto Rico finding that the population of Pájaros barrio was 1,492.

Historical population
Census	Pop.	Note	%±
1900	1,492		—
1910	4,050		171.4%
1920	1,487		−63.3%
1930	1,745		17.4%
1940	2,869		64.4%
1950	2,813		−2.0%
1960	8,340		196.5%
1970	0		−100.0%
1980	35,611		—
1990	34,168		−4.1%
2000	32,855		−3.8%
2010	30,194		−8.1%
U.S. Decennial Census; 1899 (shown as 1900) 1910-1930; 1930-1950 1980-2000 2010

== See also ==
- List of communities in Puerto Rico
