= El Jardín =

Coordinates: 26°05′S 65°23′W

- Municipality and village
- Interactive map of El Jardín
- Country: Argentina
- Province: Salta Province
- Time zone: UTC−3 (ART)

El Jardín is a village and rural municipality in Salta Province in northwestern Argentina.
