= La Candelaria, Catamarca =

Coordinates: 28°42′S 65°27′W

La Candelaria (Catamarca)
- Municipality and village
- Interactive map of La Candelaria (Catamarca)
- Country: Argentina
- Province: Catamarca Province
- Department: Ancasti
- Time zone: UTC−3 (ART)

La Candelaria (Catamarca) is a village and municipality in Catamarca Province in northwestern Argentina.
