= Mucarabones =

Barrio of Toa Alta, Puerto Rico

- Barrio
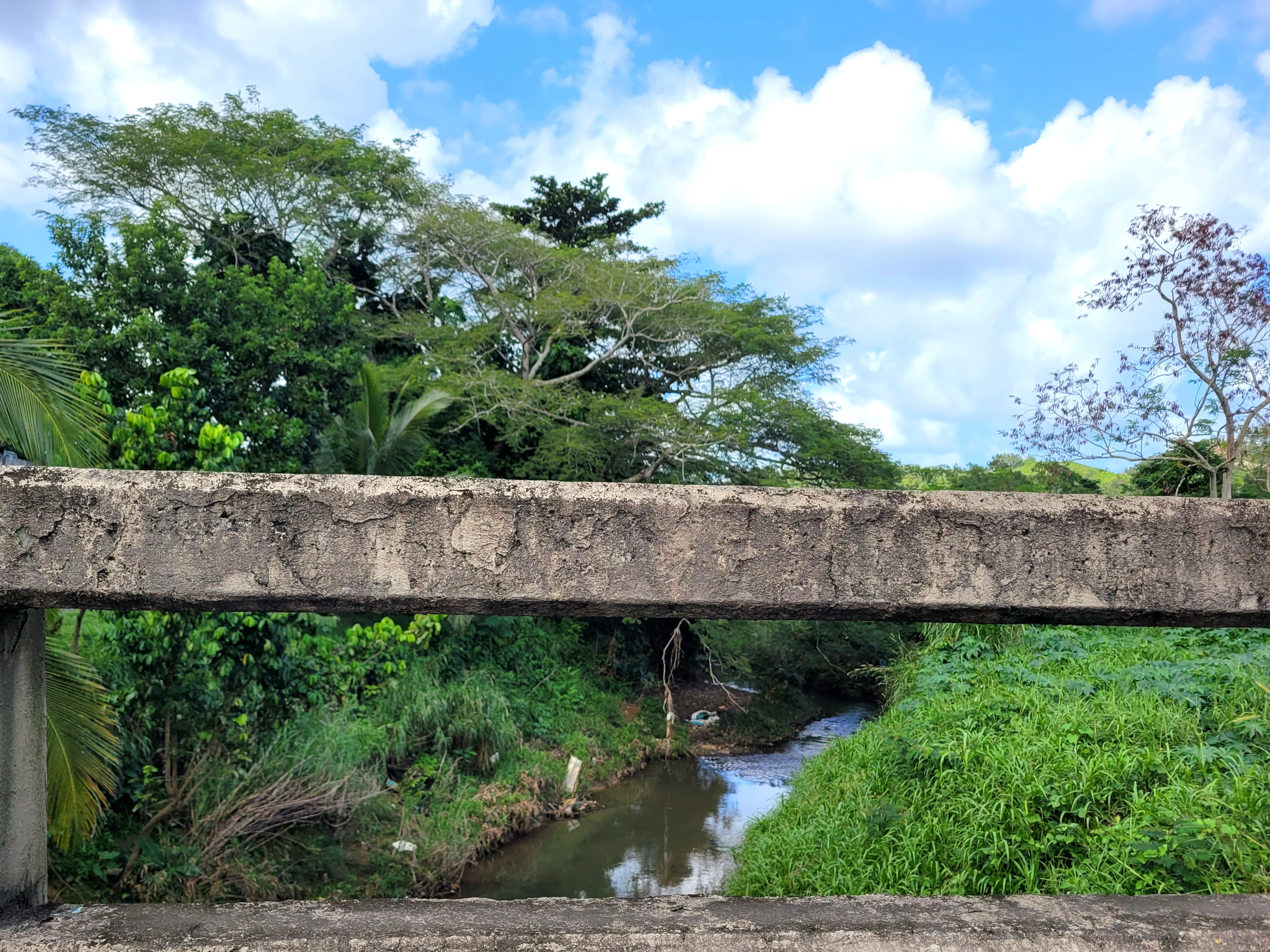
- Bucarabones River in Mucarabones

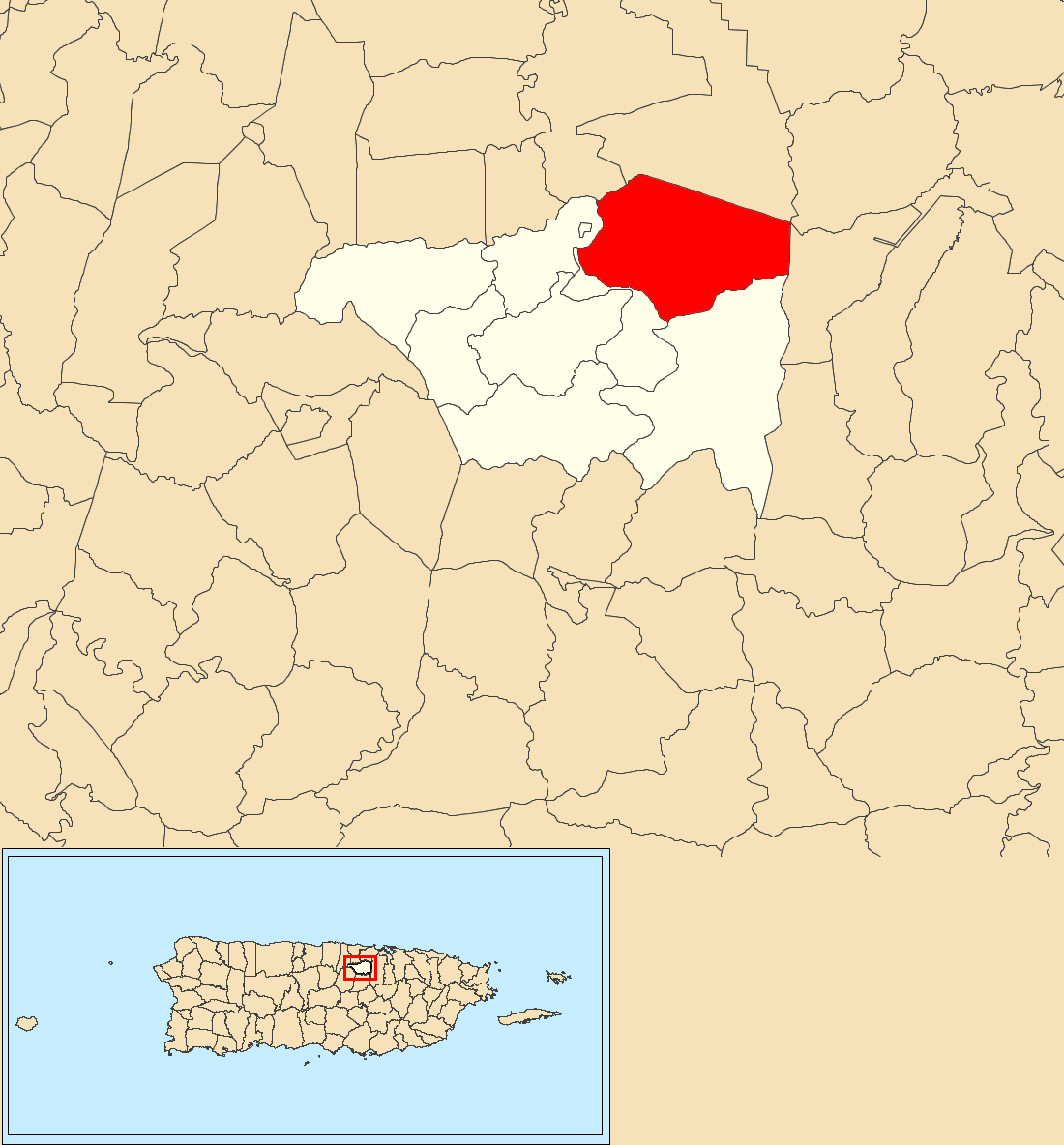
- Location of Mucarabones within the municipality of Toa Alta shown in red

- Location of Puerto Rico
- Coordinates: 18°23′00″N 66°13′22″W
- Commonwealth: Puerto Rico
- Municipality: Toa Alta

Area
  - Total: 5.33 sq mi (13.8 km^{2})
  - Land: 5.32 sq mi (13.8 km^{2})
  - Water: 0.01 sq mi (0.026 km^{2})
- Elevation: 66 ft (20 m)

Population (2010)
  - Total: 23,221
  - Density: 4,364.8/sq mi (1,685.3/km^{2})
- Source: 2010 Census
- Time zone: UTC−4 (AST)

Mucarabones is a barrio in the municipality of Toa Alta, Puerto Rico. Its population in 2010 was 23,221.

Historical population
Census	Pop.	Note	%±
1900	954		—
1910	873		−8.5%
1920	995		14.0%
1930	1,407		41.4%
1940	2,056		46.1%
1950	2,138		4.0%
1960	2,675		25.1%
1970	3,440		28.6%
1980	7,682		123.3%
1990	9,099		18.4%
2000	19,174		110.7%
2010	23,221		21.1%
U.S. Decennial Census; 1899 (shown as 1900) 1910-1930; 1930-1950 1980-2000 2010

== History ==
Mucarabones was in Spain's gazetteers until Puerto Rico was ceded by Spain in the aftermath of the Spanish–American War under the terms of the Treaty of Paris of 1898 and became an unincorporated territory of the United States. In 1899, the United States Department of War conducted a census of Puerto Rico finding that the population of Mucarabones barrio was 954.

== Sectors ==
Barrios (which are, in contemporary times, roughly comparable to minor civil divisions) in turn are further subdivided into smaller local populated place areas/units called sectores (sectors in English). The types of sectores may vary, from normally sector to urbanización to reparto to barriada to residencial, among others.

The following sectors are in Mucarabones barrio:

Calle #2 (casas 7, 8,9 y 10, Bloque B, casas 1 y 13 a la 16, Bloque C, y casas 1 a la 3, Bloque D, son tocadas), Calle 3 completa, Comunidad Acerola, Condominio Alturas de Monte Verde, Condominio Brisas II, Condominio Terrazas de Montecasino, Condominio Vistas de Montecasino, Parcelas Barrio Mucarabones, Parcelas Piñas, Reparto Doraida, Sector Arenas, Sector Brisas del Este, Sector El Turpial, Sector Jiménez, Sector La Cuerda, Sector Las Torres, Sector Los Frailes, Sector Morales, Sector Villa del Río, Sector Villa Juventud, Urbanización Alturas de Montecasino, Urbanización Aventura, Urbanización Brisas de Montecasino, Urbanización Casitas de la Fuente, Urbanización El Rosario, Urbanización Estancias de La Fuente (Fuente Imperial, Fuente del Valle, Fuente del Condado), Urbanización Estancias de San Miguel, Urbanización Estancias del Plata, Urbanización Fuente Bella, Urbanización Hacienda de Boriquén, Urbanización Haciendas del Caribe, Urbanización Jardines Casablanca, Urbanización Jardines de Escorial, Urbanización Jardines de Mediterráneo, Urbanización La Inmaculada, Urbanización Las Cascadas I y II, Urbanización Madelaine, Urbanización Mansiones Montecasino I y II, Urbanización Monte Sol, Urbanización Monte Verde, Urbanización Montecasino Heights, Urbanización Montecasino, Urbanización Parque San Miguel, Calle #1, Bloque A, casa 1 a la 18 (casa 19, Bloque A, es tocada), Urbanización Plaza de la Fuente, Urbanización Pradera del Río, Urbanización San Pedro (Calle 7, 8, 9), Urbanización Villa del Monte, and Urbanización Villas del Toa.

== See also ==
- List of communities in Puerto Rico
- List of barrios and sectors of Toa Alta, Puerto Rico
