= La Candelaria, Salta =

Coordinates: 26°06′S 65°06′W

La Candelaria (Salta)
- Municipality and village
- Interactive map of La Candelaria (Salta)
- Country: Argentina
- Province: Salta Province
- Time zone: UTC−3 (ART)
- Climate: BSh

La Candelaria (Salta) is a village and rural municipality in Salta Province in northwestern Argentina.
