= Candelaria, Toa Baja, Puerto Rico =

Barrio of Puerto Rico

Candelaria
- Barrio
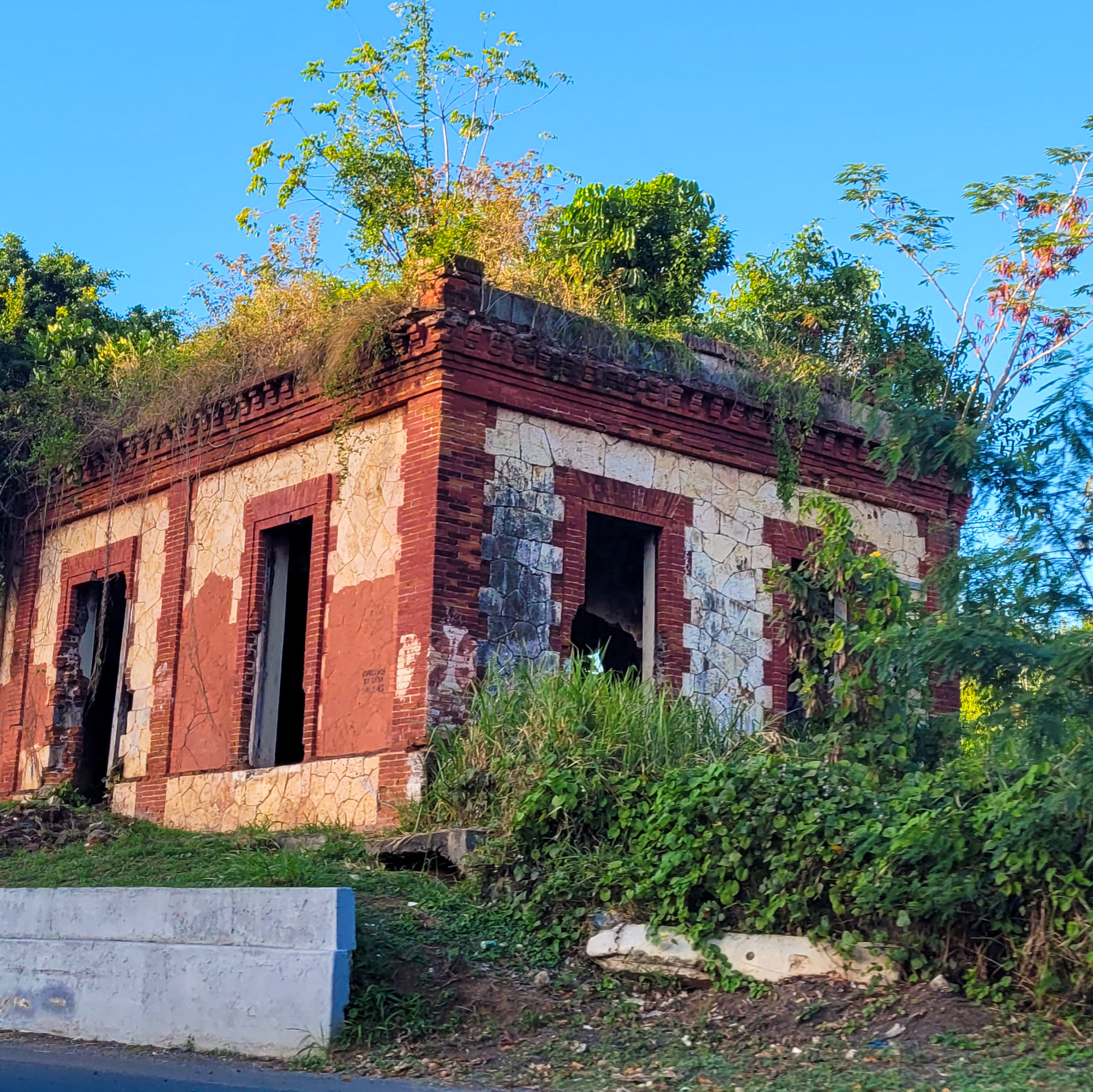
- Casilla de camineros, (historic road maintenance workers' station), in Candelaria

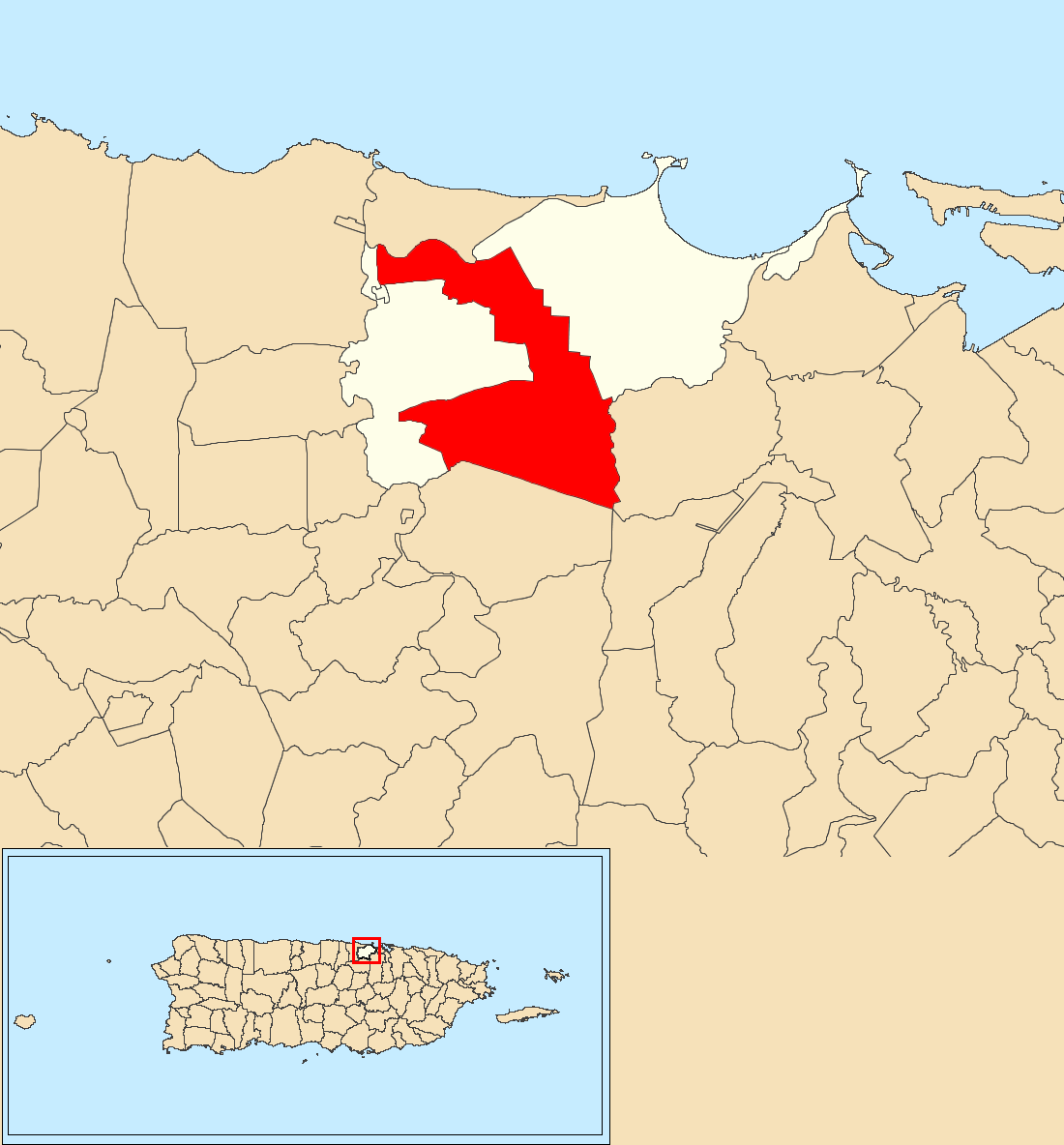
- Location of Candelaria within the municipality of Toa Baja shown in red

- Location of Puerto Rico
- Coordinates: 18°24′23″N 66°13′05″W
- Commonwealth: Puerto Rico
- Municipality: Toa Baja

Area
  - Total: 4.76 sq mi (12.3 km^{2})
  - Land: 4.76 sq mi (12.3 km^{2})
  - Water: 0 sq mi (0 km^{2})
- Elevation: 312 ft (95 m)

Population (2010)
  - Total: 23,343
  - Density: 4,904/sq mi (1,893/km^{2})
- Source: 2010 Census
- Time zone: UTC−4 (AST)
- Website: www.toabaja.com

Candelaria is a barrio in the municipality of Toa Baja, Puerto Rico. Its population in 2010 was 23,343.

== History ==
Candelaria was in Spain's gazetteers until Puerto Rico was ceded by Spain in the aftermath of the Spanish–American War under the terms of the Treaty of Paris of 1898 and became an unincorporated territory of the United States. In 1899, the United States Department of War conducted a census of Puerto Rico finding that the population of Candelaria barrio was 1,395.

Historical population
Census	Pop.	Note	%±
1900	1,395		—
1910	1,730		24.0%
1920	2,025		17.1%
1930	2,352		16.1%
1940	3,586		52.5%
1950	5,080		41.7%
1960	6,549		28.9%
1970	9,059		38.3%
1980	17,292		90.9%
1990	24,058		39.1%
2000	25,223		4.8%
2010	23,343		−7.5%
U.S. Decennial Census; 1899 (shown as 1900) 1910-1930; 1930-1950 1980-2000 2010

== Sectors ==
Barrios (which are, in contemporary times, roughly comparable to minor civil divisions) in turn are further subdivided into smaller local populated place areas/units called sectores (sectors in English). The types of sectores may vary, from normally sector to urbanización to reparto to barriada to residencial, among others.

The following sectors are in Candelaria barrio:

Barriada Fidel Torres, Barriada Márquez, Barriada Popular, Barriada Aponte, Comunidad Candelaria Arenas, Comunidad Pájaros, Comunidad Villa Pangola, Condominio Quinta Real, Condominio Terrazas de Montecasino, Proyecto Pájaros, Reparto Anamar, Reparto Molina, Sector Albizu, Sector Alto El Cabro, Sector Azucena, Sector Barriada Rosa, Sector Buen Vecino, Sector Capitán, Sector Dos Abras, Sector El Guayabal, Sector Fondo El Saco, Sector Gutiérrez, Sector Hoyo Frío, Sector Juan Chiquito, Sector La Prá I y II, Sector Los Díaz, Sector Los Jiménez, Sector Macún, Sector Monte Bello I y II, Sector Monte Bello, Sector Paco Dávila, Sector Villa Clemente, Sector Villa Dávila, Sector Villa Gutiérrez, Sector Villa Kennedy, Sector Villa Olga, Tramo Carretera 2, Ubanización Las Colinas, Urbanización Altagracia, Urbanización Altura de Hacienda Dorada, Urbanización Alturas de Covadonga, Urbanización Brisas de Montecasino, Urbanización Covadonga, Urbanización El Plantío, Urbanización El Rosario, Urbanización Estancias de la Fuente (Fuente Imperial, Fuente Condado y Fuente del Valle), Urbanización Fuente Royal, Urbanización Fuentebella, Urbanización Haciendas del Norte, Urbanización Mansiones Montecasino I y II, Urbanización Quintas del Norte Calle 4 (Casas C-25, E-14, E-15, E-16, E-26), Urbanización San Pedro, Urbanización San Rafael Estate, Urbanización Santa María, and Urbanización y Extensión La Inmaculada.

== Notable people of Candelaria ==
- Esmeralda Santiago, author of autobiography "When I Was Puerto Rican"

== Gallery ==
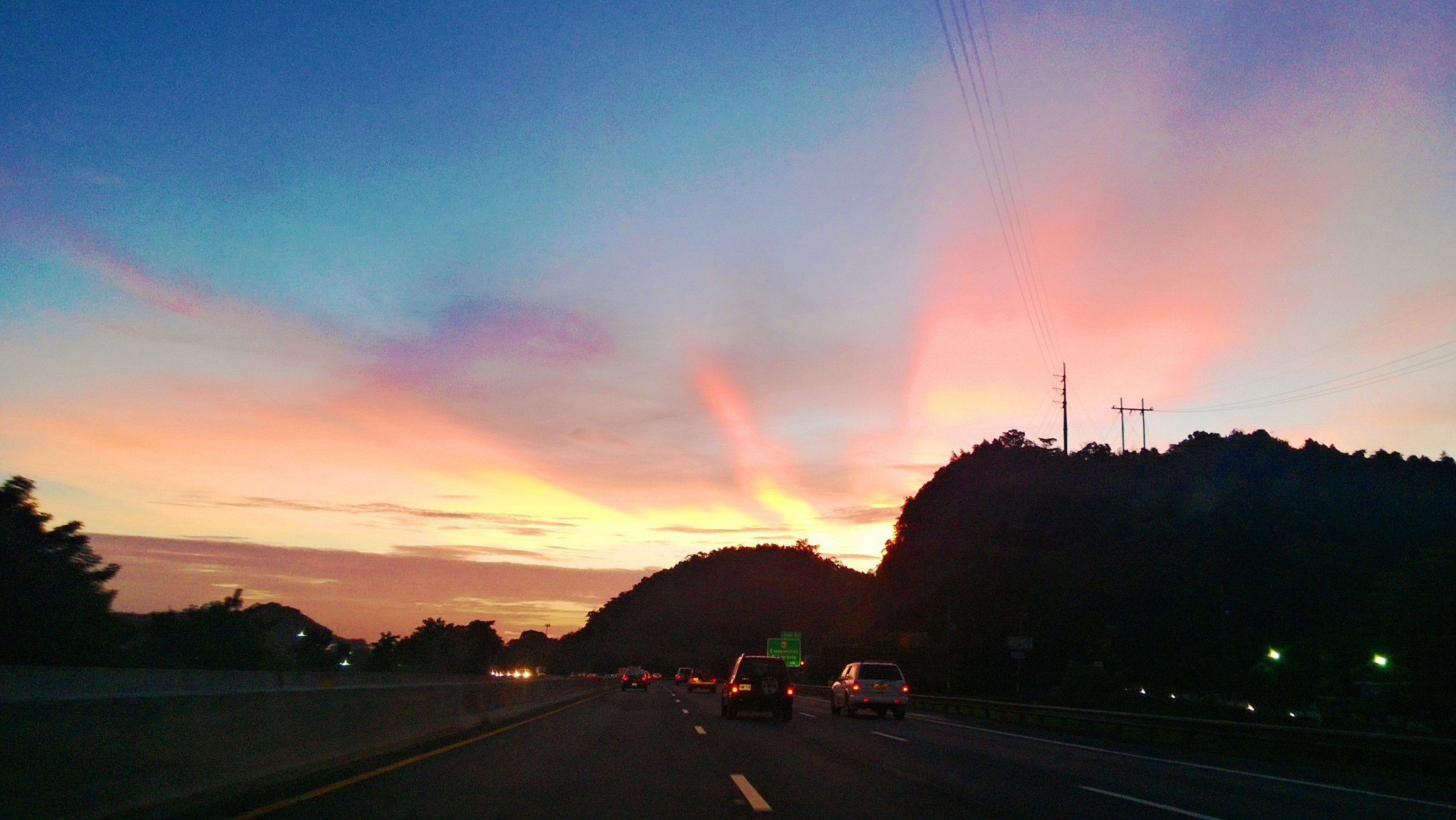
Puerto Rico Highway 22 in Candelaria at dawn

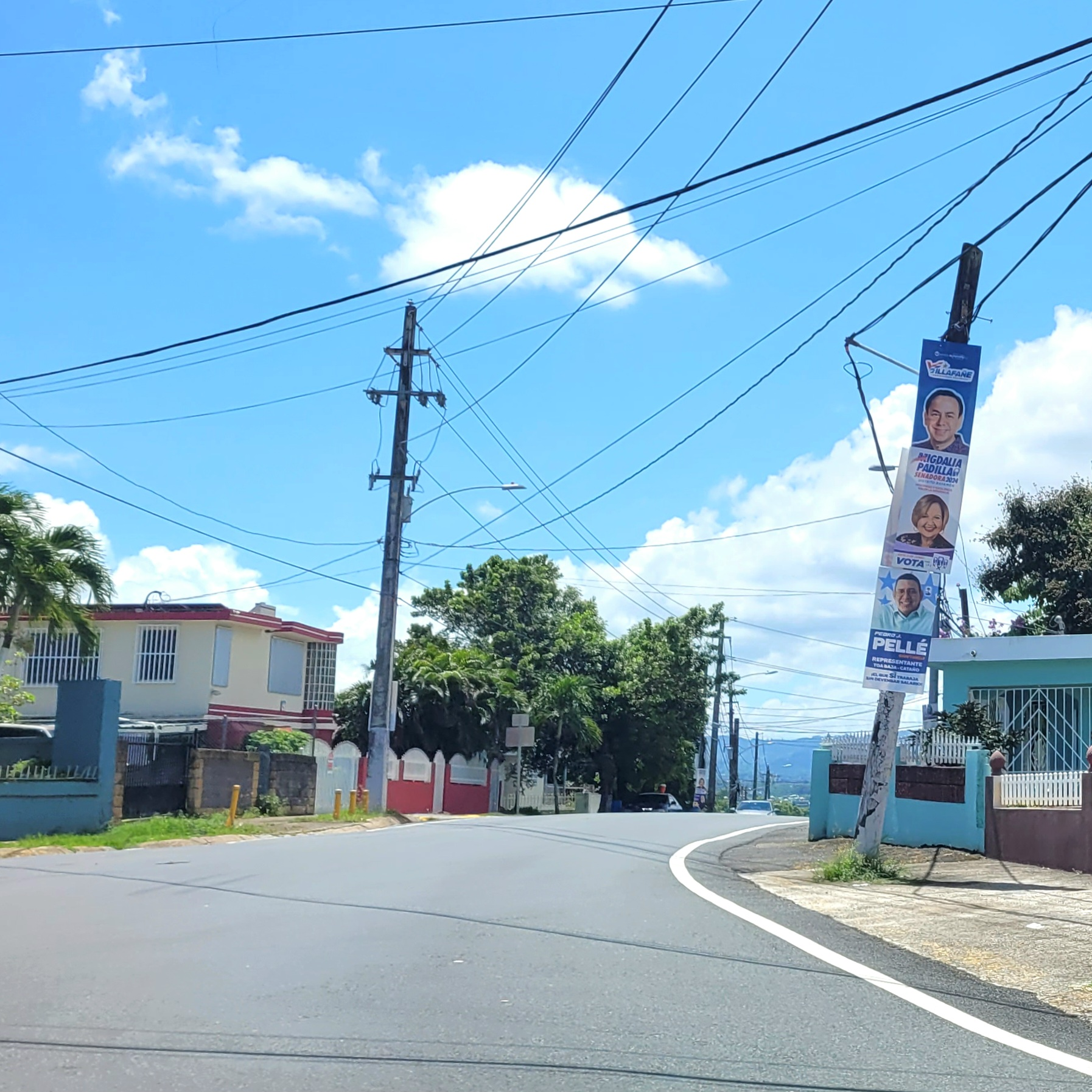
Puerto Rico Highway 819 in Candelaria

== See also ==
- List of communities in Puerto Rico
- List of barrios and sectors of Toa Baja, Puerto Rico
