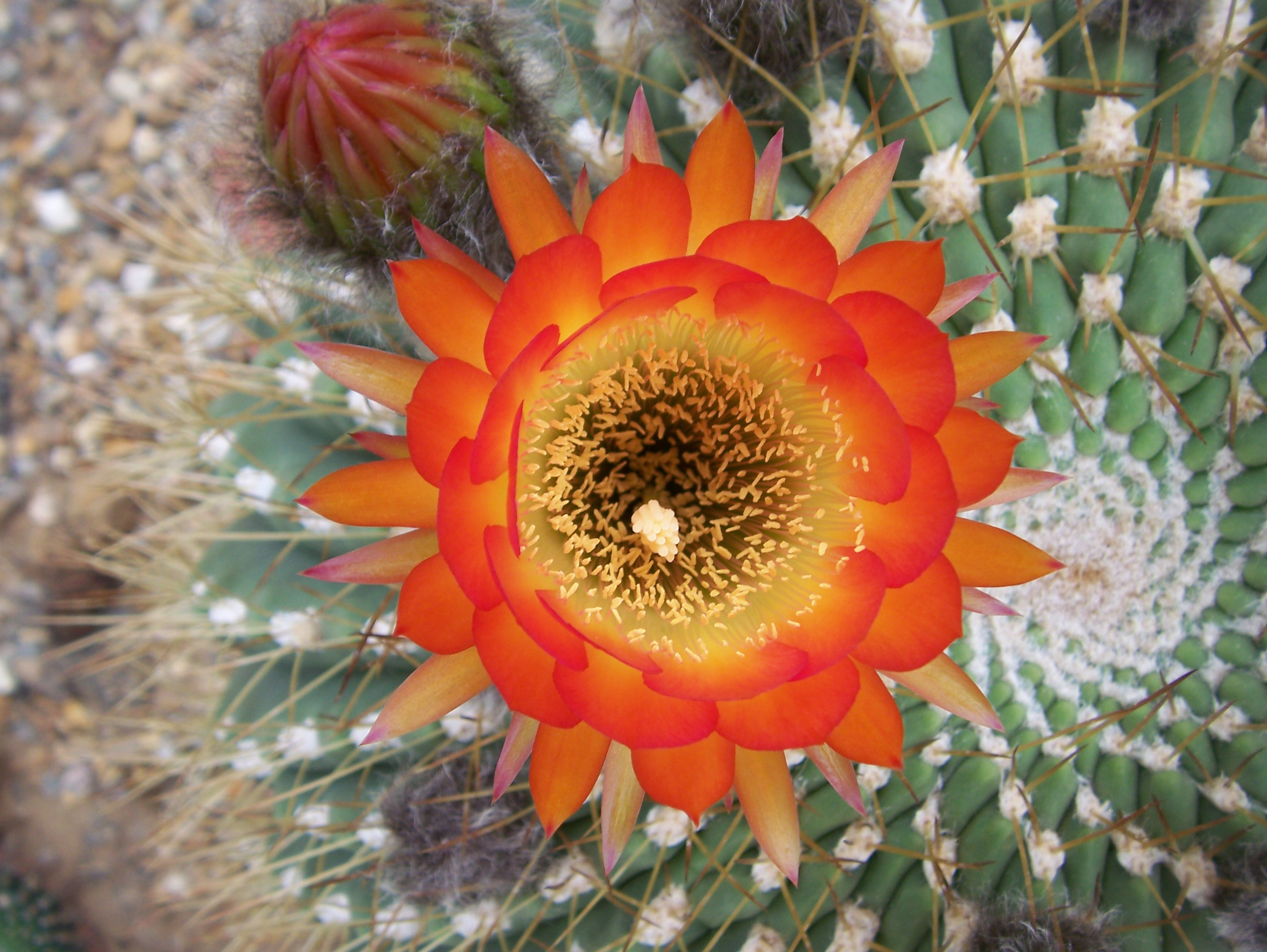
- Soehrensia bruchii, synonym of Echinopsis bruchii

Scientific classification
- Kingdom: Plantae
- Clade: Embryophytes
- Clade: Tracheophytes
- Clade: Angiosperms
- Clade: Eudicots
- Order: Caryophyllales
- Family: Cactaceae
- Subfamily: Cactoideae
- Tribe: Cereeae
- Subtribe: Trichocereinae
- Genus: Soehrensia; Backeb.

Type species
- Soehrensia bruchii (Britton & Rose) Backeb. ≡ Echinopsis bruchii

Species
- Formerly around 24, see text.

= Soehrensia =

Genus of cacti

Soehrensia is a formerly accepted genus of cacti native to South America. It is now included within Echinopsis. Its former species are native to northern Argentina, Bolivia, northern Chile, Paraguay and Peru, and have been introduced elsewhere, including Mexico, southern Africa and Spain.

== Taxonomy ==
The genus was established by Curt Backeberg in 1938. The genus name Soehrensia is in honour of Johannes Soehrens (died 1934), who was a Dutch botanist and Professor and Director of the Botanical Garden in Santiago de Chile. He was an authority on cacti.

Studies in the 1970s and 1980s resulted in several formerly separate genera being absorbed into Echinopsis, including Soehrensia. In the 2016 edition of the CITES Cactaceae Checklist, it was restored as an independent genus, the position of the World Flora Online as of November 2025. A major 2025 classification of the family Cactaceae returned Soehrensia to a synonym of Echinopsis, the position accepted by Plants of the World Online as of November 2025.

=== Species ===
Species previously placed in the genus Soehrensia that Plants of the World Online places in Echinopsis include:

Flower	Plant	Scientific Name	Distribution
		Soehrensia angelesiae (R.Kiesling) Schlumpb. → Echinopsis angelesiae	Argentina (Salta)
		Soehrensia arboricola (Kimnach) Schlumpb. → Echinopsis arboricola	Argentina (Salta), Bolivia
		Soehrensia bruchii (Britton & Rose) Backeb. → Echinopsis bruchii	Argentina (Tucumán)
		Soehrensia camarguensis (Cárdenas) Schlumpb. → Echinopsis camarguensis	Bolivia
		Soehrensia candicans (Gillies ex Salm-Dyck) Schlumpb. → Echinopsis candicans	Argentina
		Soehrensia caulescens (F.Ritter) Schlumpb. → Echinopsis caulescens	Bolivia
		Soehrensia formosa (Pfeiff.) Backeb. → Echinopsis formosa	Argentina, Bolivia, Chile
		Soehrensia grandiflora (Britton & Rose) Schlumpb. → Echinopsis crassicaulis	Argentina
		Soehrensia hahniana (Backeb.) Schlumpb. → Echinopsis hahniana	Paraguay (Rio Apa)
		Soehrensia huascha (F.A.C.Weber) Schlumpb. → Echinopsis huascha	Argentina
		Soehrensia quadratiumbonata (F.Ritter) Schlumpb. → Echinopsis quadratiumbonata	Bolivia.
		Soehrensia sandiensis (Hoxey) Schlumpb. → Echinopsis sandiensis	Peru
		Soehrensia schickendantzii (F.A.C.Weber) Schlumpb. → Echinopsis schickendantzii	Argentina.
		Soehrensia serpentina (M.Lowry & M.Mend.) Schlumpb. → Echinopsis serpentina	Bolivia, Peru
		Soehrensia shaferi (Britton & Rose) Schlumpb. → Echinopsis friedrichii	Argentina
		Soehrensia smrziana (Backeb.) Backeb. → Echinopsis smrziana	Argentina
		Soehrensia spachiana (Lem.) Schlumpb. → Echinopsis spachiana	Argentina, Bolivia
		Soehrensia strigosa (Salm-Dyck) Schlumpb. → Echinopsis strigosa	Argentina
		Soehrensia tarijensis (Vaupel) Schlumpb. → Echinopsis tarijensis	Bolivia, Argentina (Jujuy)
		Soehrensia thelegona (F.A.C.Weber) Schlumpb. → Echinopsis thelegona	Argentina
		Soehrensia thelegonoides (Speg.) Schlumpb. → Echinopsis thelegonoides	Argentina (Jujuy)
		Soehrensia vasquezii (Rausch) Schlumpb. → Echinopsis vasquezii	Bolivia
		Soehrensia volliana (Backeb.) Schlumpb. → Echinopsis volliana	Bolivia
		Soehrensia walteri (R.Kiesling) Schlumpb. → Echinopsis walteri	Argentina (Salta)

A hybrid originally named Trichocereus × mendocinus in 2000 was placed in Soehrensia as Soehrensia × mendocina in 2021. As of February 2026, Plants of the World Online regarded this as "unplaced". It is considered to be a hybrid between Soehrensia candicans (=Echinopsis candicans) and S. strigosa (=E. strigosa).

== Bibliography ==
- Edward F. Anderson, The Cactus Family (Timber Press, 2001) ISBN 0-88192-498-9, pp. 255–286
