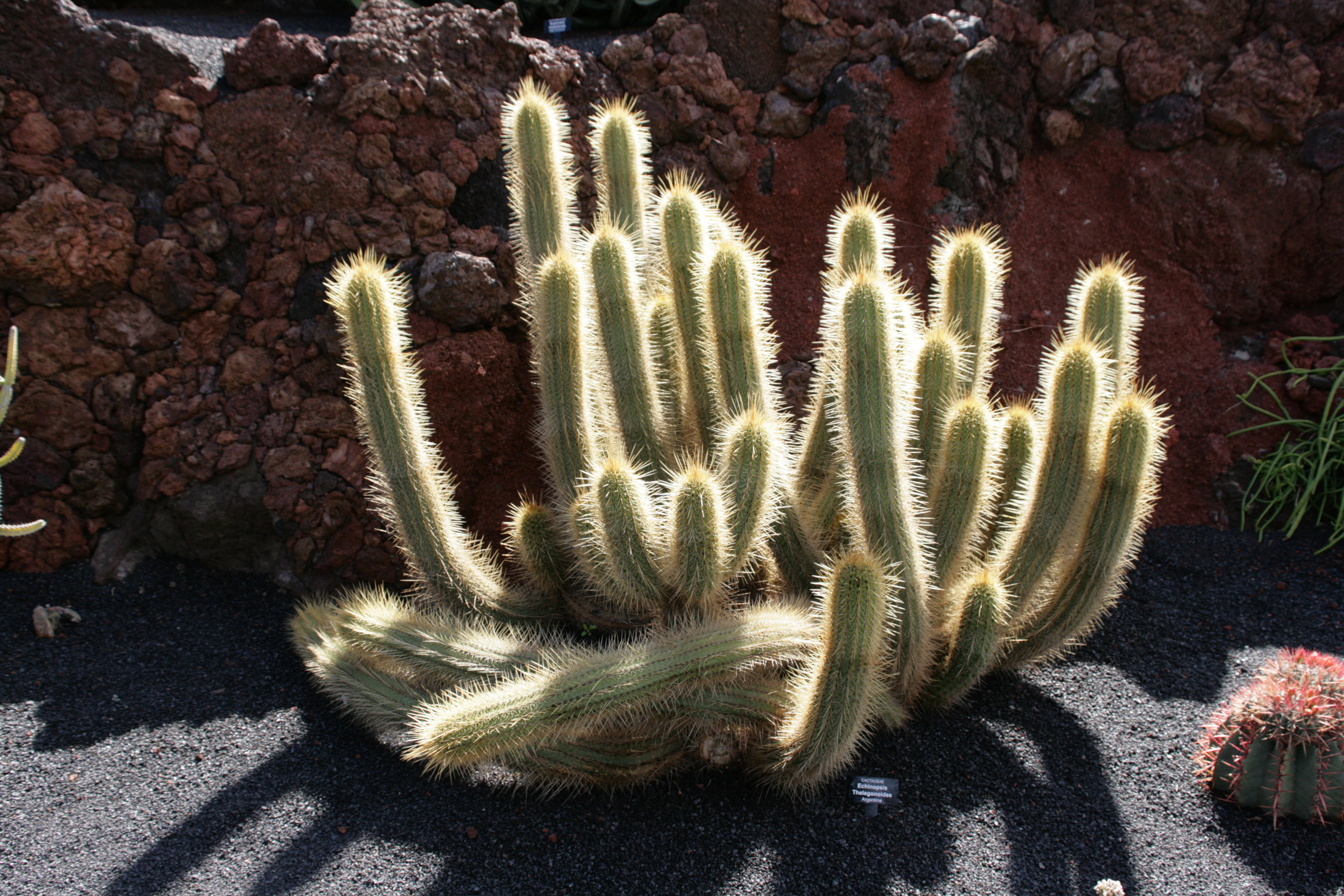

Conservation status
- Vulnerable (IUCN 3.1)

Scientific classification
- Kingdom: Plantae
- Clade: Tracheophytes
- Clade: Angiosperms
- Clade: Eudicots
- Order: Caryophyllales
- Family: Cactaceae
- Subfamily: Cactoideae
- Genus: Echinopsis
- Species: E. thelegonoides

Binomial name
- Echinopsis thelegonoides (Speg.) H.Friedrich & G.D.Rowley

Synonyms
- Cereus thelegonoides Speg.; Echinopsis rubinghiana (Backeb.) H.Friedrich & G.D.Rowley; Soehrensia thelegonoides (Speg.) Schlumpb.; Trichocereus rubinghianus Backeb.; Trichocereus thelegonoides (Speg.) Britton & Rose

= Echinopsis thelegonoides =

Species of cactus

Echinopsis thelegonoides, synonym Soehrensia thelegonoides, is a species of Echinopsis found in Argentina.

== Description ==
Echinopsis thelegonoides grows as a shrub with prostrate, upright, 3 to 6 m (10 to 20 ft) long shoots. Prostrate parts of the shoots are very thick, upright parts of the shoots grow up to 1 meter high and have a diameter of 5 to 8 cm (2.0 to 3.1 in). There are 15 to 16 low and blunt ribs, which are slightly notched but not tuberculated. There is a clear furrow between the small, circular areoles. Yellow to brownish, bristle-like thorns emerge from the areoles and turn gray with age. The four central spines are 0.7 to 1.5 cm (0.3 to 0.6 in). The approximately eleven marginal spines are 0.5 to 0.7 cm (0.2 to 0.3 in) long.

The funnel-shaped, white, fragrant flowers appear on the sides or near the tips of the shoots and open at night. They are 20 to 24 cm (8 to 9 in) long. The spherical to ellipsoidal fruits have a diameter of 4 to 6 cm (1.6 to 2.4 in).

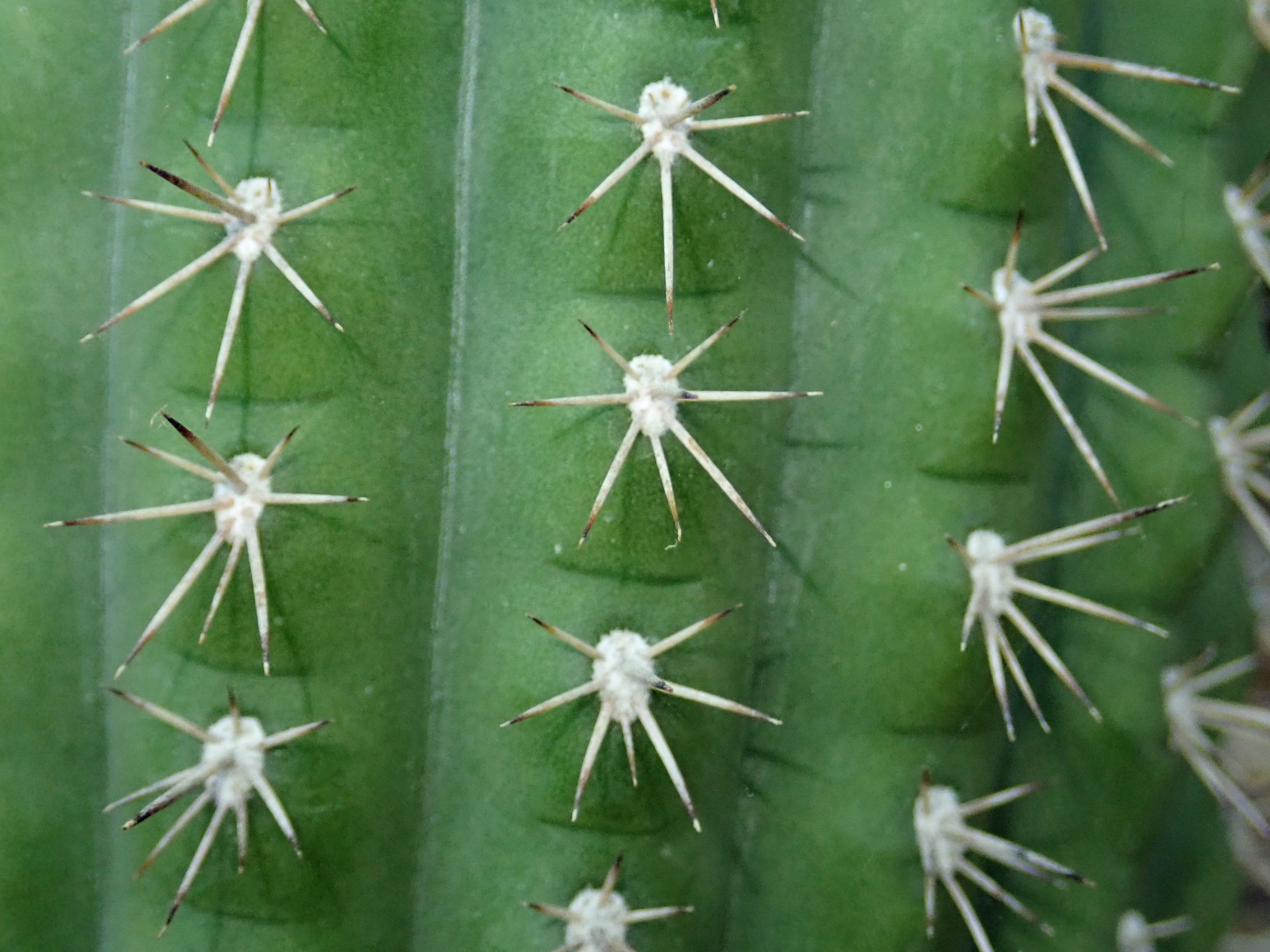
Spines

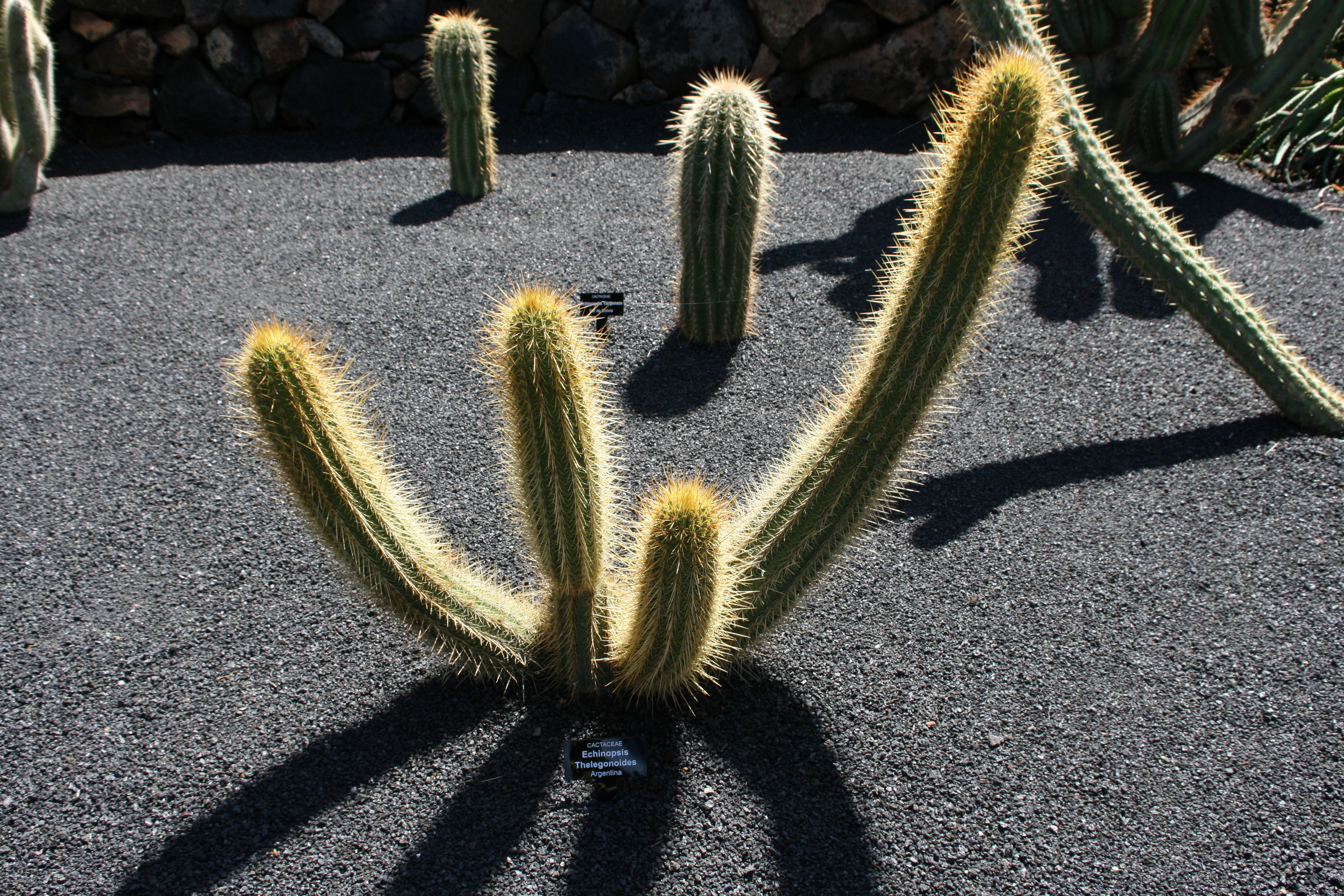
Plant

== Taxonomy ==
The first description as Cereus thelegonoides by Carlos Luis Spegazzini was published in 1905. The specific epithet thelegonoides is derived from the Greek word -oides for 'resemble' and refers to the similarity of the species to Cereus thelegonus (now Echinopsis thelegona). Boris O. Schlumpberger placed the species in the genus Soehrensia in 2012. As of February 2026, Plants of the World Online placed it in the genus Echinopsis.

== Distribution ==
Echinopsis thelegonoides is native to northwest Argentina. It is common in the Argentine province of Jujuy on dry slopes at altitudes of 500 to 2,000 m (1,640 to 6,562 ft).
