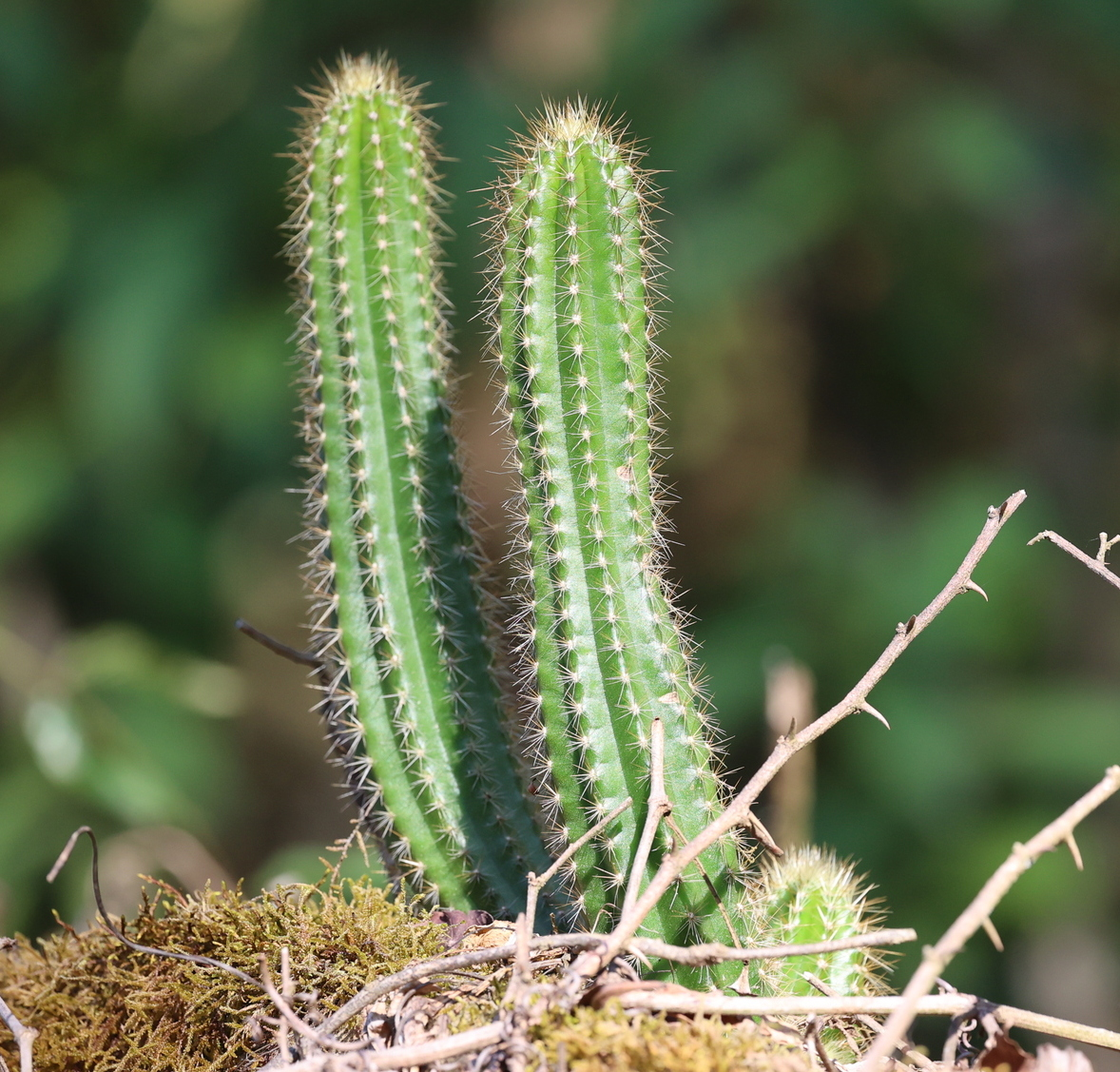

Scientific classification
- Kingdom: Plantae
- Clade: Tracheophytes
- Clade: Angiosperms
- Clade: Eudicots
- Order: Caryophyllales
- Family: Cactaceae
- Subfamily: Cactoideae
- Genus: Echinopsis
- Species: E. arboricola

Binomial name
- Echinopsis arboricola (Kimnach) Mottram

Synonyms
- Soehrensia arboricola (Kimnach) Schlumpb.; Trichocereus arboricola Kimnach

= Echinopsis arboricola =

Species of cacti

Echinopsis arboricola, synonym Soehrensia arboricola, is a species of Soehrensia found in northwest Argentina and Bolivia.

== Description ==
Echinopsis arboricola is a shrubby plant that starts upright but later becomes drooping. Its slender, cylindrical, dark green stems can grow over 120 cm (47 in) long, with a diameter of 2.5 to 4 cm (0.98 to 1.57 in), and develop aerial roots. The stems have nine to eleven ribs with almost cube-shaped or conical humps up to 3 mm (0.12 in) high, topped with wooly white areoles. From these areoles, nine to 15 needle-like thorns radiate, one of which is longer, ranging from 0.1 to 2.3 cm (0.039 to 0.906 in) in length and yellowish to brownish in color. The bell-shaped, white flowers bloom near the top of the shoot, opening at night. They measure 12 to 13 cm (4.7 to 5.1 in) long and 13 to 15 cm (5.1 to 5.9 in) in diameter.

== Taxonomy ==
Originally described as Trichocereus arboricola by Myron William Kimnach in 1990, the species was named for its epiphytic habitat, with "arboricola" derived from the Latin "arbor" (tree) and "-cola" (dweller). In 2012, Boris O. Schlumpberger reclassified the species into the genus Soehrensia. As of February 2026, Plants of the World Online placed it in the genus Echinopsis.

== Distribution ==
Echinopsis arboricola is found in southern Bolivia and the Salta province of Argentina, at altitudes of 500 to 1,000 m (1,600 to 3,300 ft).
