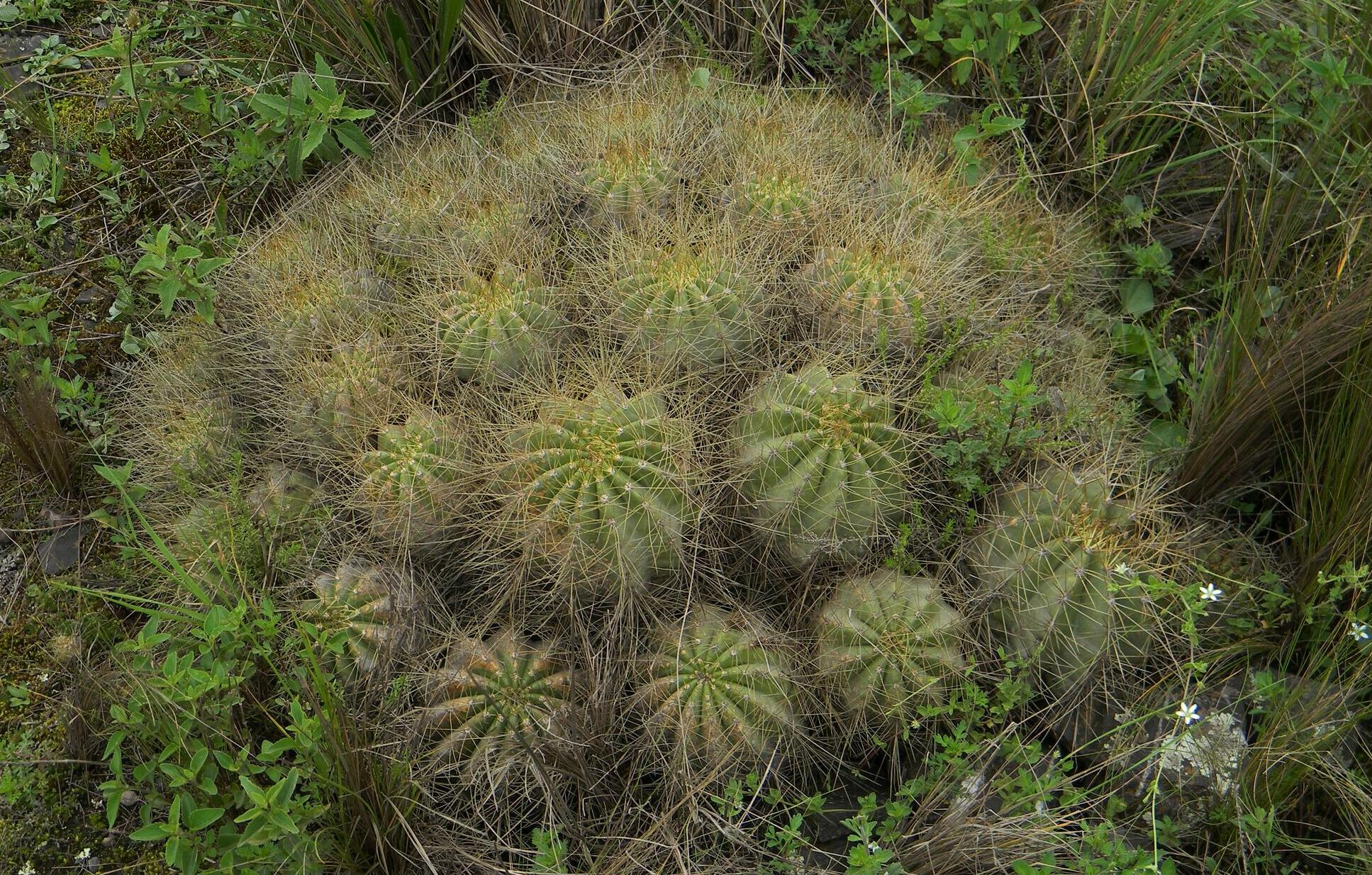

Conservation status
- Critically Endangered (IUCN 3.1)

Scientific classification
- Kingdom: Plantae
- Clade: Tracheophytes
- Clade: Angiosperms
- Clade: Eudicots
- Order: Caryophyllales
- Family: Cactaceae
- Subfamily: Cactoideae
- Genus: Echinopsis
- Species: E. walteri

Binomial name
- Echinopsis walteri (R.Kiesling) H.Friedrich & Glaetzle

Synonyms
- Lobivia huascha var. walteri (R.Kiesling) Rausch; Lobivia walteri R.Kiesling; Soehrensia walteri (R.Kiesling) Schlumpb.; Trichocereus walteri (R.Kiesling) J.G.Lamb.

= Echinopsis walteri =

Species of cacti

Echinopsis walteri, synonym Soehrensia walteri, is a species of Echinopsis found in northwest Argentina.

== Description ==
Echinopsis walteri typically forms groups of spherical, green shoots, each up to 16 cm in diameter and height. It has about eleven ribs, each 1.5 to 2.5 cm wide, with whitish areoles. From these areoles, 5 to 15 flexible, needle-like yellow spines emerge, each 1 to 2.5 cm long.

The bell-shaped, yellow flowers are slightly fragrant and appear from the youngest areoles near the shoot apex, opening during the day. They are 7.5 to 9 cm long and up to 9 cm in diameter. The spherical, greenish-yellow fruits are 1.7 to 2 cm long and 2 to 2.5 cm in diameter.

== Taxonomy ==
First described as Lobivia walteri by Roberto Kiesling in 1976, the species name honors Austrian cactus specialist Walter Rausch. Boris O. Schlumpberger reclassified it into the genus Soehrensia in 2012. As of February 2026, Plants of the World Online placed it in the genus Echinopsis.

== Distribution ==
Echinopsis walteri is found in the Argentine province of Salta, specifically in the Quebrada de Escoipe, at altitudes of 2,000 to 2,500 m (6,600 to 8,200 ft).
