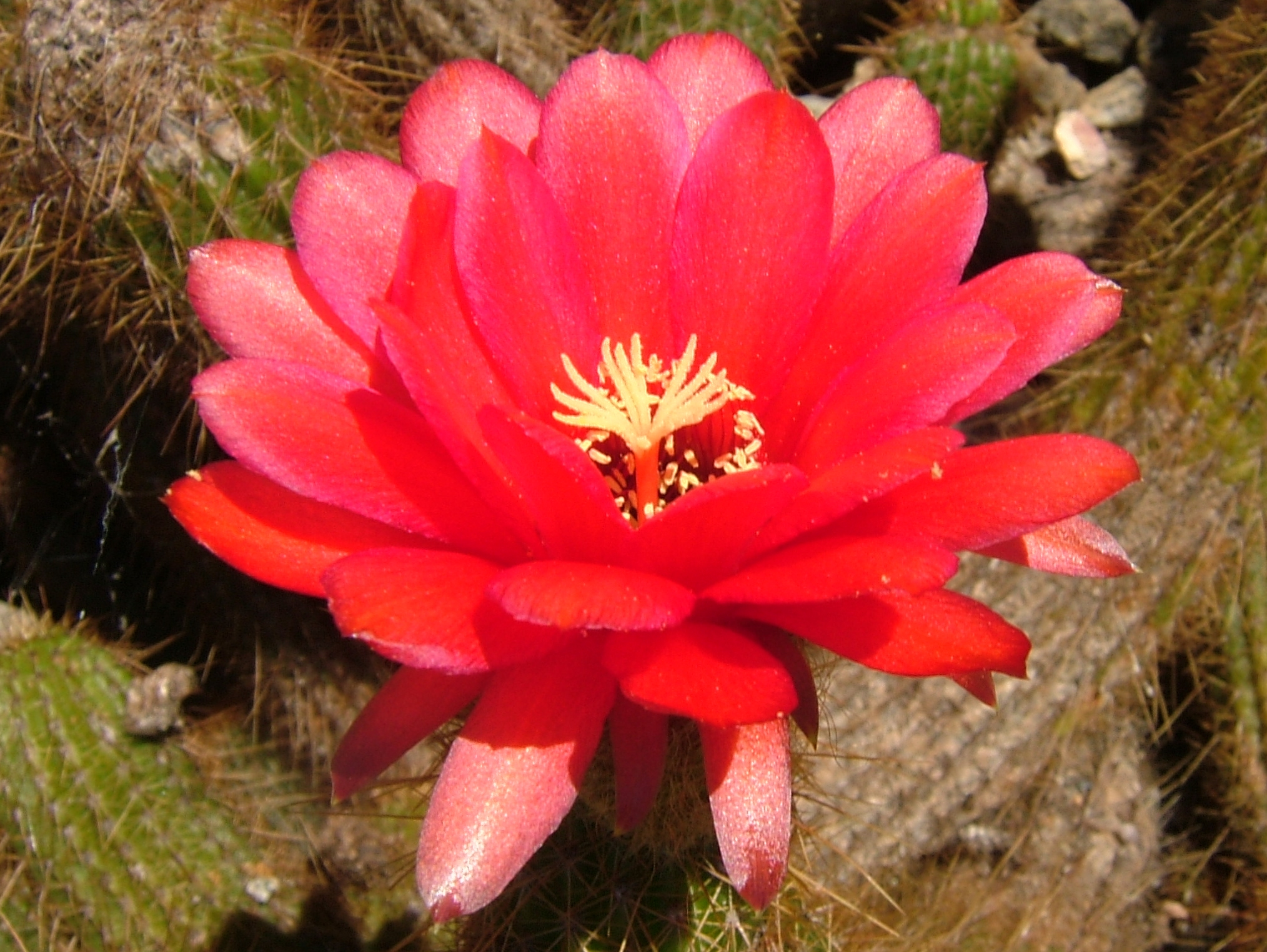

Conservation status
- Least Concern (IUCN 3.1)

Scientific classification
- Kingdom: Plantae
- Clade: Tracheophytes
- Clade: Angiosperms
- Clade: Eudicots
- Order: Caryophyllales
- Family: Cactaceae
- Subfamily: Cactoideae
- Genus: Echinopsis
- Species: E. huascha

Binomial name
- Echinopsis huascha (F.A.C.Weber) H.Friedrich & G.D.Rowley

Synonyms
- Of the species: Cereus huascha F.A.C.Weber; Helianthocereus huascha (F.A.C.Weber) Backeb.; Lobivia huascha (F.A.C.Weber) W.T.Marshall; Salpingolobivia huascha (F.A.C.Weber) Y.Itô; Soehrensia huascha (F.A.C.Weber) Schlumpb.; Trichocereus huascha (F.A.C.Weber) Britton & Rose; Trichocereus crassicaulis (R.Kiesling) Lodé; Of subspecies huascha: List: Acanthocalycium hyalacanthum (Speg.) Backeb.; Cereus andalgalensis F.A.C.Weber ex K.Schum.; Cereus huascha var. rubriflorus F.A.C.Weber; Echinopsis huascha var. auricolor (Backeb.) H.Friedrich & G.D.Rowley; Echinopsis huascha var. rubriflora (F.A.C.Weber) H.Friedrich & G.D.Rowley; Echinopsis hyalacantha (Speg.) Werderm.; Echinopsis pecheretiana (Backeb.) H.Friedrich & G.D.Rowley; Echinopsis vatteri (R.Kiesling) G.D.Rowley; Helianthocereus andalgalensis (F.A.C.Weber ex K.Schum.) Backeb.; Helianthocereus huascha var. auricolor (Backeb.) Backeb.; Helianthocereus huascha var. macranthus Backeb.; Helianthocereus huascha var. rubriflorus (F.A.C.Weber) Backeb.; Helianthocereus hyalacanthus (Speg.) Backeb.; Helianthocereus pecheretianus Backeb.; Helianthocereus pecheretianus var. viridior Backeb.; Lobivia andalgalensis Britton & Rose; Lobivia formosa var. hyalacantha (Speg.) Rausch; Lobivia grandiflora Werderm., nom. illeg. homonym. post.; Lobivia grandiflora var. lobivioides (F.Ritter) Rausch; Lobivia huascha var. andalgalensis (F.A.C.Weber ex K.Schum.) Rausch; Lobivia huascha var. calliantha (F.Ritter) Rausch; Lobivia huascha var. purpureominiata (F.Ritter) Rausch, without basionym ref.; Lobivia huascha var. rubriflora (F.A.C.Weber) G.D.Rowley; Lobivia hyalacantha Speg.; Lobivia purpureominiata F.Ritter; Salpingolobivia andalgalensis (F.A.C.Weber ex K.Schum.) Y.Itô; Soehrensia huascha var. rosiflora Y.Itô; Soehrensia lobivioides (F.Ritter) Schlumpb.; Soehrensia vatteri (R.Kiesling) Lodé; Trichocereus andalgalensis (F.A.C.Weber ex K.Schum.) Hosseus; Trichocereus andalgalensis var. auricolor (Backeb.) F.Ritter, without basionym page; Trichocereus auricolor Backeb.; Trichocereus callianthus F.Ritter; Trichocereus catamarcensis F.Ritter; Trichocereus grandiflorus Backeb.; Trichocereus huascha var. flaviflora Hosseus; Trichocereus huascha var. pecheretianus (Backeb.) R.Kiesling; Trichocereus lobivioides F.Ritter; Trichocereus vatteri R.Kiesling; Of subsp. robusta: Lobivia huascha var. robusta Rausch; Soehrensia huascha subsp. robusta (Rausch) Schlumpb.; Trichocereus huascha subsp. robustus (Rausch) Guiggi

= Echinopsis huascha =

Species of cactus

Echinopsis huascha, synonym Soehrensia huascha, is a species of Echinopsis in the family Cactaceae, found in north western Argentina.

== Description ==
The plants usually branch at the base and form low groups with heights of up to 1 m (3.3 ft). The cylindrical, fresh green, upright or creeping trunks with an erect shoot tip have 14 to 17 ribs and reach about 5 cm (2.0 in) in diameter. The areoles, from which the yellowish to brownish, needle-like spines arise, reach a diameter of up to 1 cm (0.39 in). The 1 to 3 central spines are slightly thicker than the radial spines and are 2 to 7 cm (0.79 to 2.76 in) long. The 9 to 11 radial spines are up to 1.5 in long.

The funnel-shaped to bell-shaped flowers that appear near the apex are very variable. They open during the day and are up to 10 cm (3.9 in) long and up to 7 cm (2.8 in) in diameter. The olive green, 4.5 cm (1.8 in) long flower cup is covered with 4 to 6 mm (0.16 to 0.24 in) long, brownish to black hair.

The spherical to egg-shaped fruits are yellowish green or reddish and reach a diameter of up to 3 cm (1.2 in).

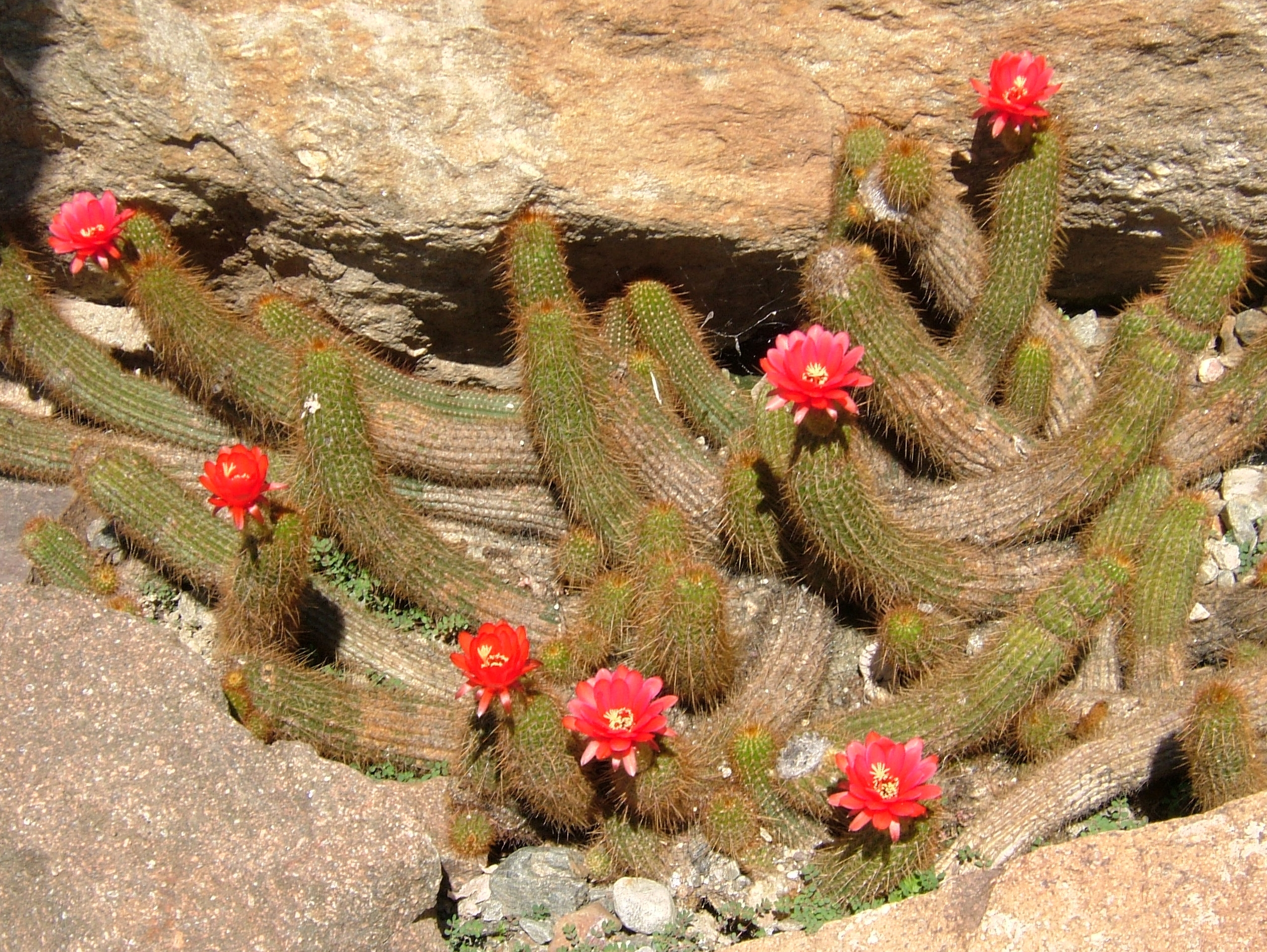
Plant

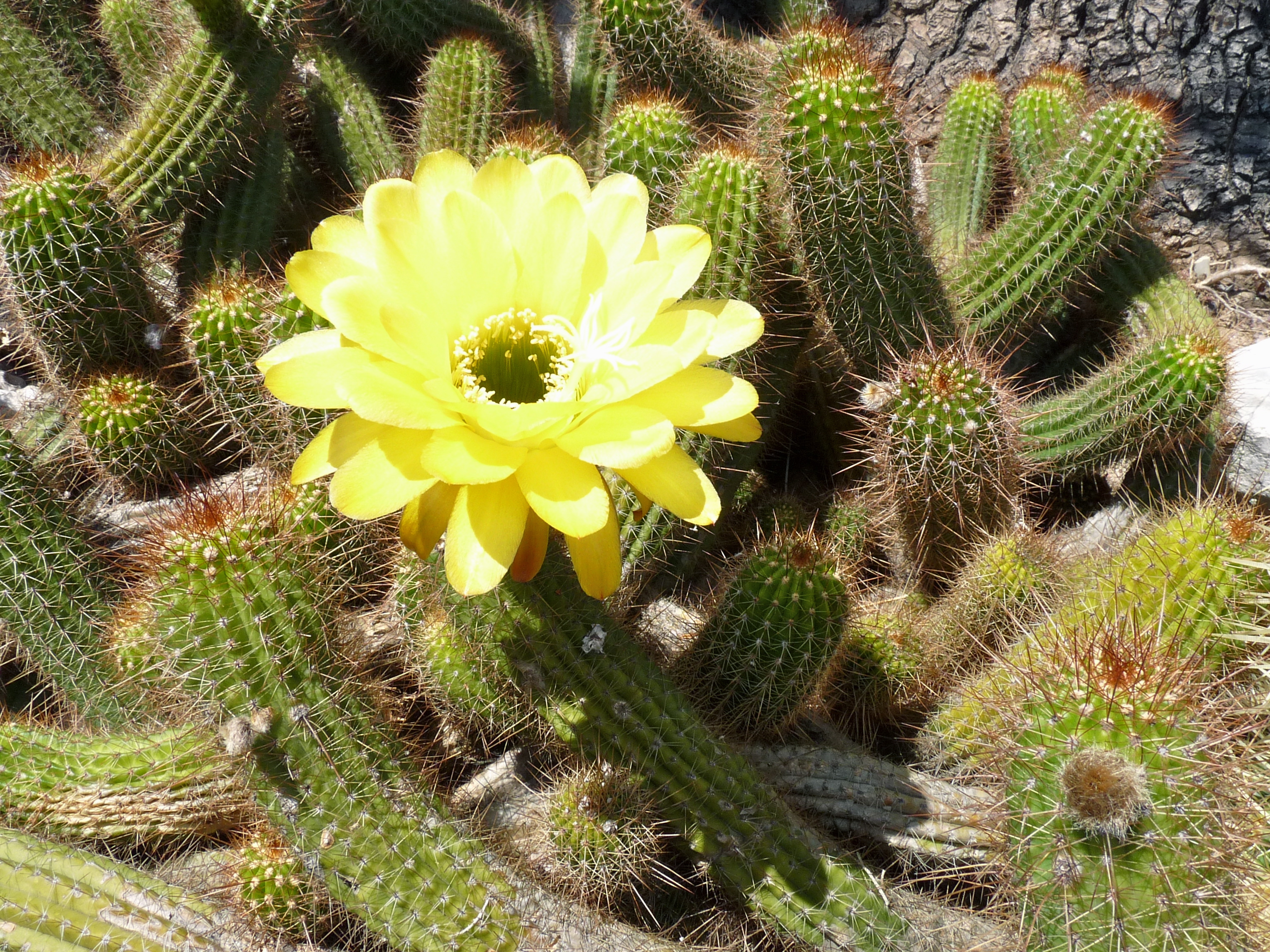
Yellow Flower

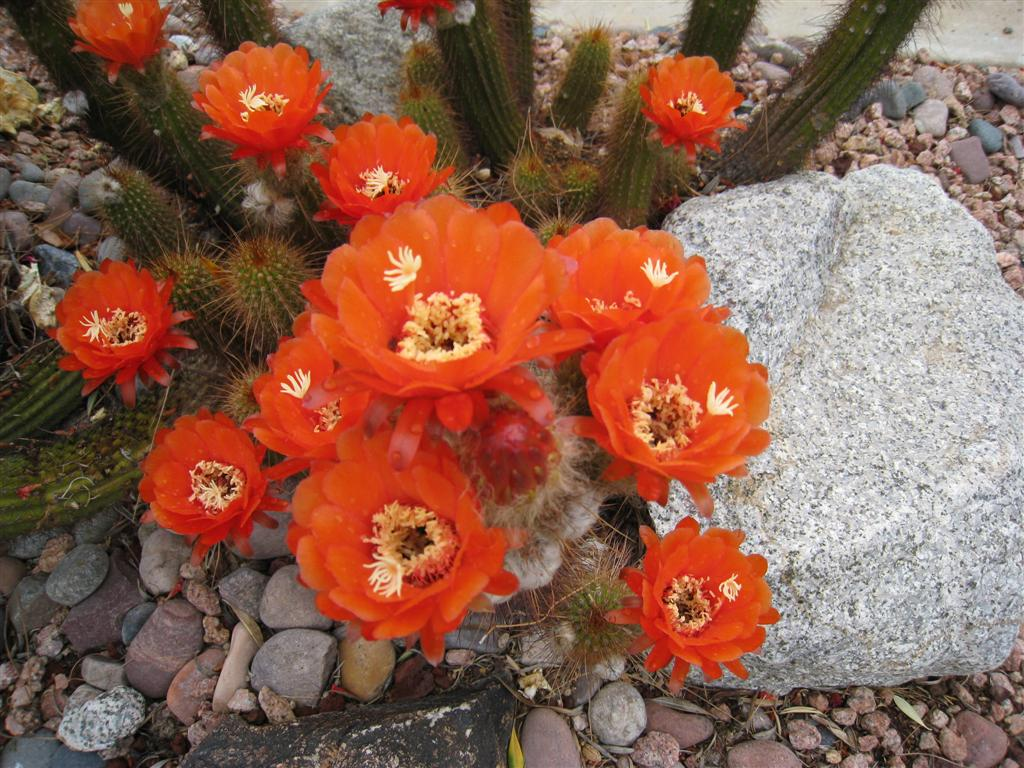
Orange flower

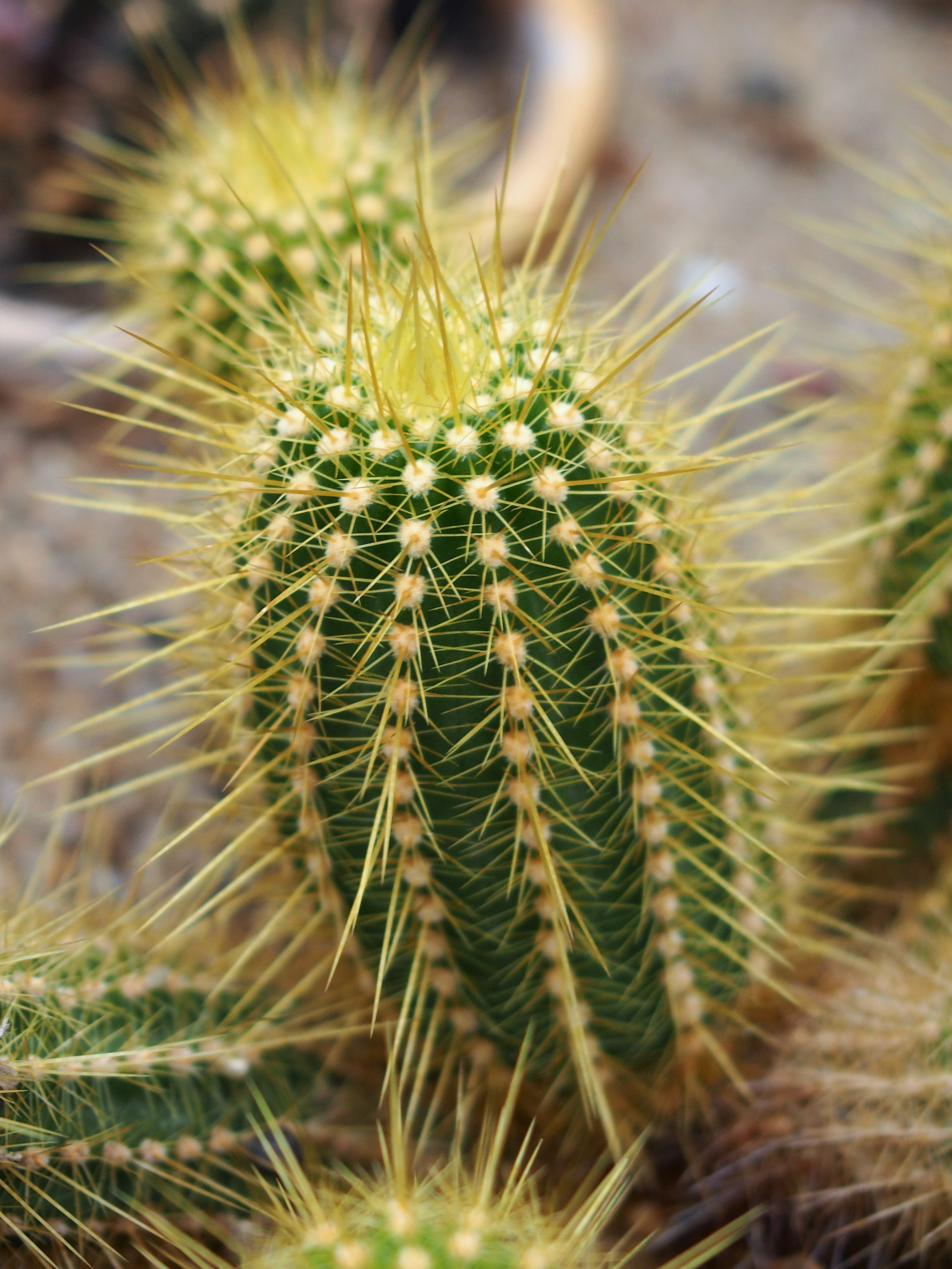
Plant closeup

== Taxonomy ==
The first description of the species was as Cereus huascha in 1893 by Frédéric Albert Constantin Weber. The specific epithet huascha is derived from a local Argentine word meaning 'orphan'. It was transferred to the genus Echinopsis in 1974. Boris O. Schlumpberger placed the species in the genus Soehrensia in 2013. As of February 2026, this placement was not accepted by Plants of the World Online, which retained it in Echinopsis.

=== Subspecies ===
It has 2 accepted subspecies:

- Echinopsis huascha subsp. huascha
- Echinopsis huascha subsp. robusta (Rausch) Schlumpb.

== Distribution ==
Echinopsis huascha is widespread in the northwest of Argentina in the provinces of Catamarca and La Rioja and grows at altitudes of 500 to 2,000 m (1,600 to 6,600 ft).
