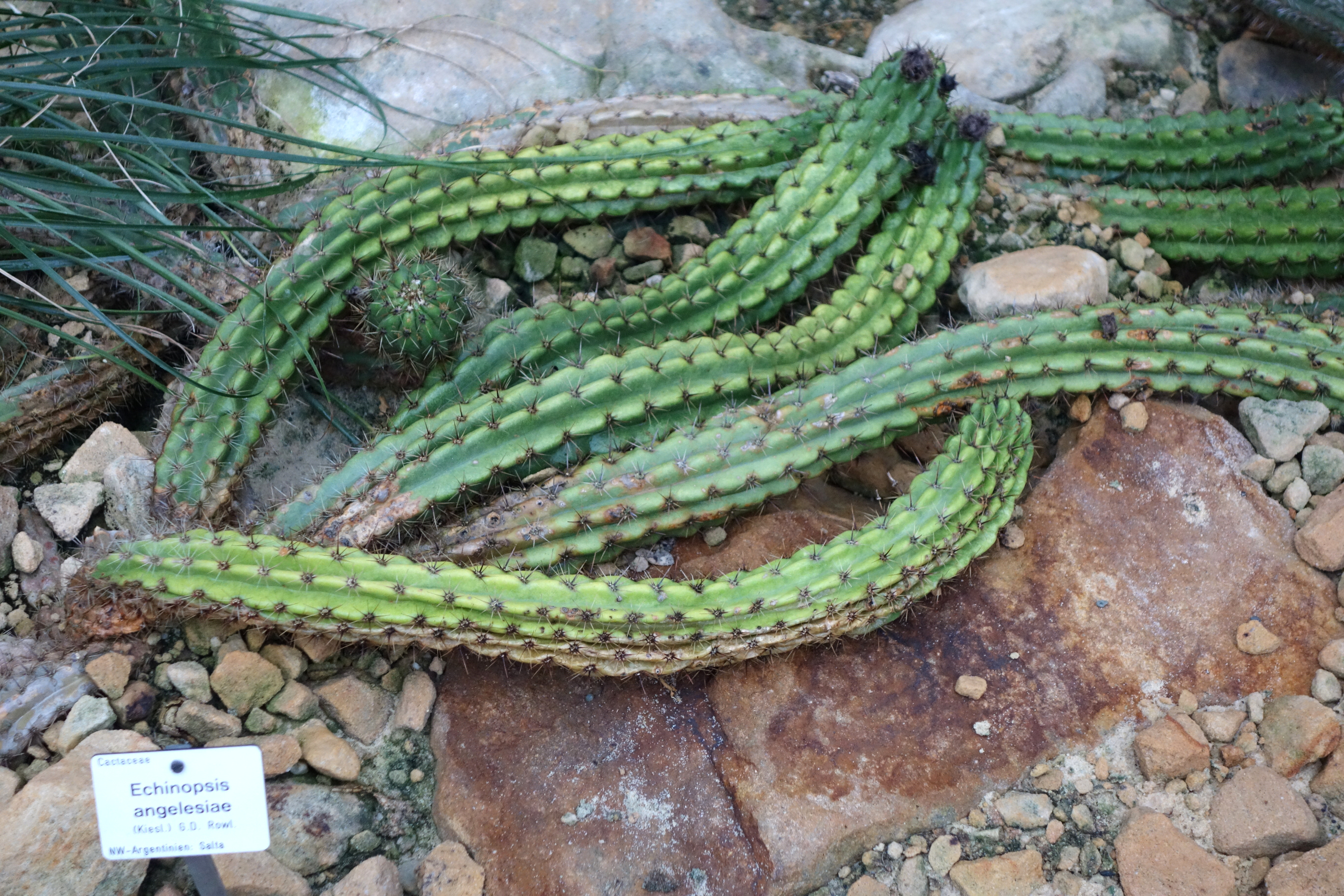

Conservation status
- Endangered (IUCN 3.1)

Scientific classification
- Kingdom: Plantae
- Clade: Tracheophytes
- Clade: Angiosperms
- Clade: Eudicots
- Order: Caryophyllales
- Family: Cactaceae
- Subfamily: Cactoideae
- Genus: Echinopsis
- Species: E. angelesiae

Binomial name
- Echinopsis angelesiae (R.Kiesling) G.D.Rowley

Synonyms
- Soehrensia angelesiae (R.Kiesling) Schlumpb.; Trichocereus angelesiae R.Kiesling

= Echinopsis angelesiae =

Species of cactus

Echinopsis angelesiae, synonym Soehrensia angelesiae, is a species of cactus native to Argentina.

== Description ==
Echinopsis angelesiae grows as a shrub. It numerously from the base and forms low thickets up to 1 m (3 ft) high. The ascending, cylindrical, light green shoots are opaque and reach a diameter of 6 to 6.5 cm (2.4 to 2.6 in). There are about twelve sharp-edged, low, blunt ribs that are notched. The oval areoles on it are sparsely woolly. Stiff, prickly thorns emerge from them and are enlarged at their base. The individual central spine is up to 2 cm (0.79 in) long. The twelve marginal spines are arranged in pairs on the sides. The lowest marginal spine is longer than the others. The marginal spines are up to 1.5 cm (0.59 in) long.

The bell-shaped, tubular white flowers appear near the tips of the shoots. They grow up to 20 cm (7.9 in) long and have a diameter of 14 cm (5.5 in).

== Taxonomy ==
The first description as Trichocereus angelesiae by Roberto Kiesling was published in 1931. The specific epithet angelesiae honors Angeles G. Lopez de Kiesling, who was married to the Argentine botanist Roberto Kiesling. Boris O. Schlumpberger placed the species in the genus Soehrensia in 2012. As of February 2026, Plants of the World Online placed it in the genus Echinopsis.

== Distribution ==
Echinopsis angelesiae is native to northwest Argentina. It is widespread in the Argentine department of Guachipas at altitudes of 1,400 m (4,600 ft).
