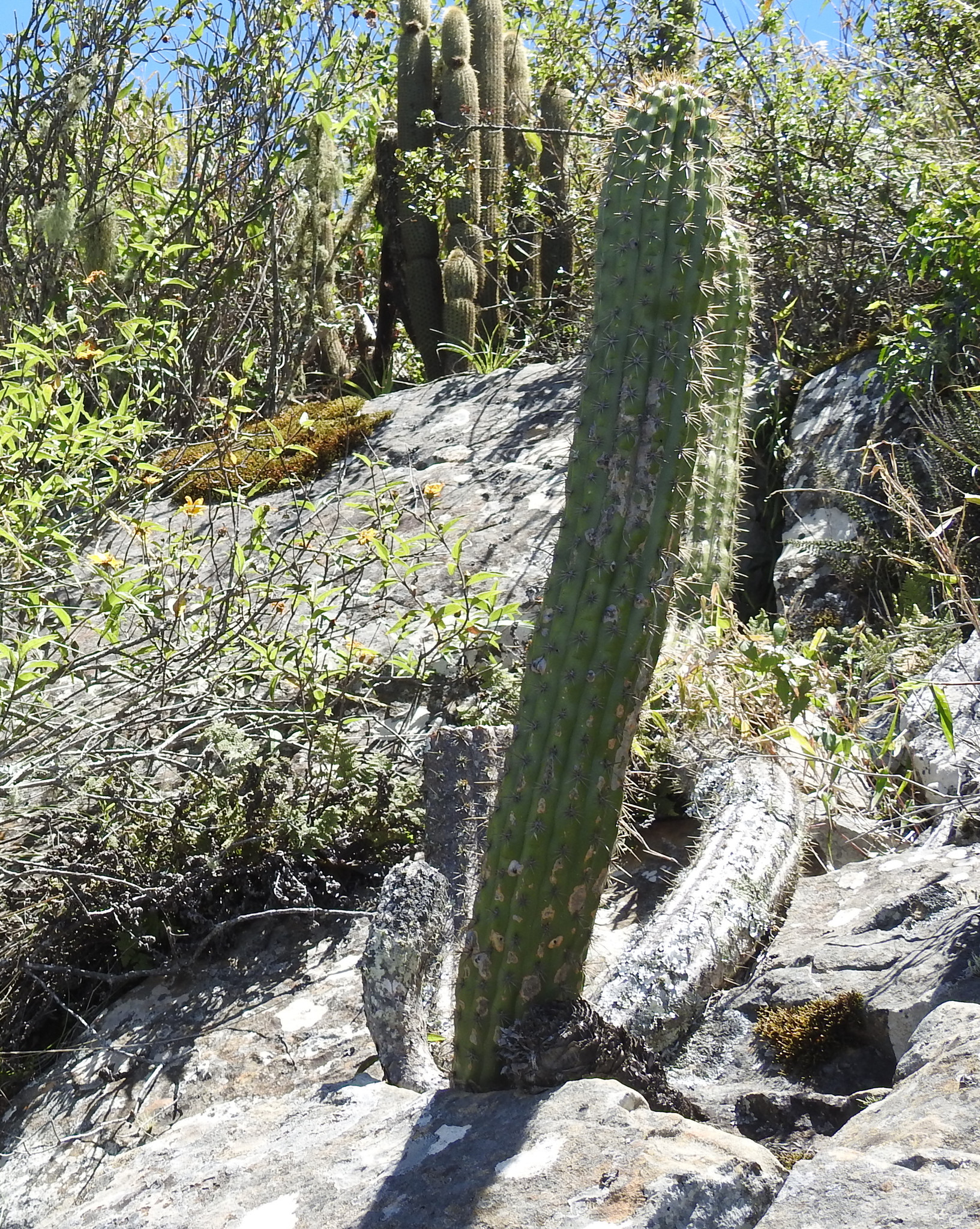

Conservation status
- Least Concern (IUCN 3.1)

Scientific classification
- Kingdom: Plantae
- Clade: Tracheophytes
- Clade: Angiosperms
- Clade: Eudicots
- Order: Caryophyllales
- Family: Cactaceae
- Subfamily: Cactoideae
- Genus: Echinopsis
- Species: E. quadratiumbonata

Binomial name
- Echinopsis quadratiumbonata (F.Ritter) D.R.Hunt

Synonyms
- Soehrensia quadratiumbonata (F.Ritter) Schlumpb.; Trichocereus quadratiumbonatus F.Ritter

= Echinopsis quadratiumbonata =

Species of cacti

Echinopsis quadratiumbonata, synonym Soehrensia quadratiumbonata, is a species of Echinopsis found in Bolivia.

== Description ==
Echinopsis quadratiumbonata grows as a shrub with several upright branches emerging from the base, reaching heights of up to 1 m (3 ft). The cylindrical green stems are 4 to 5 cm (1.6 to 2.0 in) in diameter. There are nine to twelve ribs with cross-grooves. The round, brown areoles on the ribs are about 1 cm (0.39 in) apart, from which white, needle-like spines with brown tips emerge. Typically, there is a single robust central spine, 1 to 4 cm (0.39 to 1.57 in) long, and seven to ten radial spines measuring 0.4 to 1 cm (0.16 to 0.39 in) in length.

The long, funnel-shaped white flowers open at night, but not fully. The dark green fruits are up to 3.5 cm (1.4 in) long and wide.

== Taxonomy ==
First described as Trichocereus quadratiumbonatus by Friedrich Ritter in 1980, the species epithet derives from the Latin words quadratus (four-sided) and umbonatus (navel-like), referring to the almost rectangular ribs of the plant. Boris O. Schlumpberger reclassified the species into the genus Soehrensia in 2012. As of February 2026, Plants of the World Online placed it in the genus Echinopsis.

== Distribution ==
Echinopsis quadratiumbonata is native to Bolivia. It is found in the departments of Chuquisaca and Santa Cruz at elevations of 1,000 to 1,900 m (3,300 to 6,200 ft).
