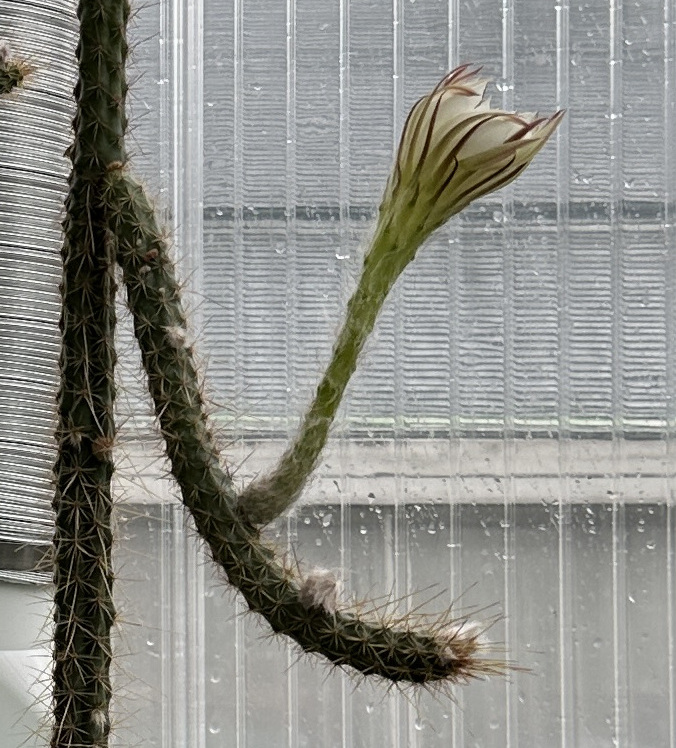

Scientific classification
- Kingdom: Plantae
- Clade: Tracheophytes
- Clade: Angiosperms
- Clade: Eudicots
- Order: Caryophyllales
- Family: Cactaceae
- Subfamily: Cactoideae
- Genus: Echinopsis
- Species: E. hahniana

Binomial name
- Echinopsis hahniana (Backeb.) R.S.Wallace

Synonyms
- Harrisia hahniana (Backeb.) Kimnach & Hutchison; Mediocactus hahnianus Backeb.; Soehrensia hahniana (Backeb.) Schlumpb.; Trichocereus hahnianus (Backeb.) Guiggi

= Echinopsis hahniana =

Species of cacti

Echinopsis hahniana, synonym Soehrensia hahniana, is a species of Echinopsis found in Paraguay. It has a perennial life cycle.

== Description ==
Echinopsis hahniana grows with creeping, prostrate or hanging, laterally branching shoots. The spherical to cylindrical, light green to dark-green shoots reach heights of up to 1 m (3.3 ft) with a diameter of 1.5–3.0 cm (0.59–1.18 in). There are eight low ribs that are notched and tuberous with areoles at the edge. The areoles have 8-14 whitish yellow to light brown spines. The 1-3 central spines are 0.5 to 0.8 cm (0.20 to 0.31 in) long. The radial spines are 0.5 cm (0.20 in) long. The broad, funnel-shaped woolly buds with creamy white flowers appear near the top of the shoot and are open during the day. They are 15.5 to 17 cm (6.1 to 6.7 in) long and 11.5–12 cm (4.5–4.7 in) in diameter. The ovoid shiny green fruits are 32 mm (1.3 in) long and 23 cm (9.1 in) in diameter and are covered with scales. The plant has black brown seeds.

== Taxonomy ==
This species was first described by Curt Backeberg as Mediocactus hahnianus in 1957 based on a plant found in Hahn's nursery. The plant was rediscovered in the Chaco Basin, Paraguay in 2009 by Lidia Pérez de Molas. Boris O. Schlumpberger placed the species in the genus Soehrensia in 2012. As of February 2026, Plants of the World Online placed it in the genus Echinopsis.

== Distribution ==
Echinopsis hahniana is native to Paraguay. Plants are found growing in the shade in dry woodland forest in alkaline clay soil in Rio Apa, Presidente Hayes Department, at elevations of 200 to 500 meters.
