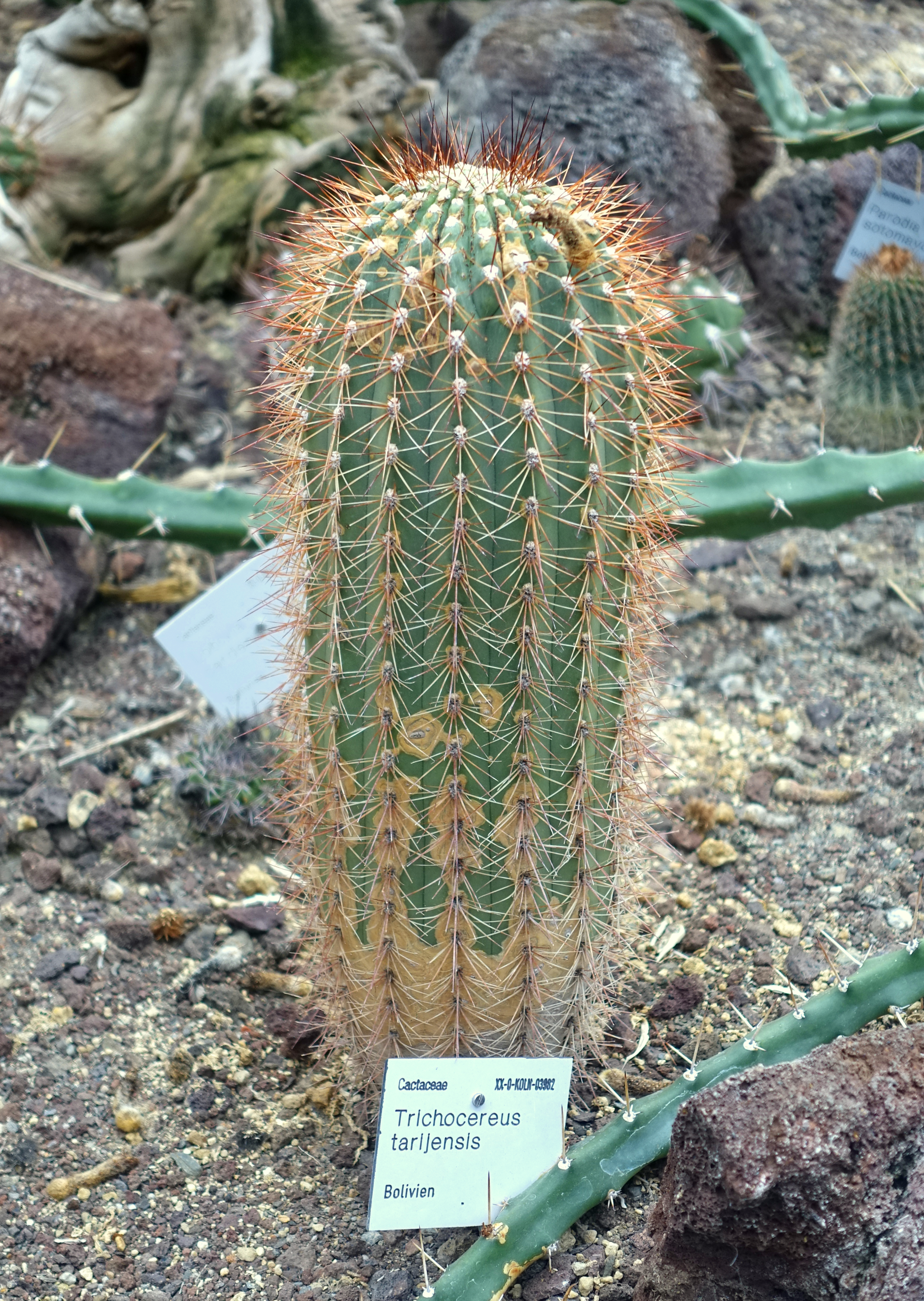

Conservation status
- Least Concern (IUCN 3.1)

Scientific classification
- Kingdom: Plantae
- Clade: Tracheophytes
- Clade: Angiosperms
- Clade: Eudicots
- Order: Caryophyllales
- Family: Cactaceae
- Subfamily: Cactoideae
- Genus: Echinopsis
- Species: E. tarijensis

Binomial name
- Echinopsis tarijensis (Vaupel) H.Friedrich & G.D.Rowley

Synonyms
- Cereus tarijensis Vaupel; Helianthocereus tarijensis (Vaupel) Backeb.; Lobivia formosa subsp. tarijensis (Vaupel) Rausch; Lobivia formosa var. tarijensis (Vaupel) Rausch; Soehrensia tarijensis (Vaupel) Schlumpb.; Trichocereus tarijensis (Vaupel) Werderm.

= Echinopsis tarijensis =

Species of cactus

Echinopsis tarijensis, synonym Soehrensia tarijensis, is a species of Echinopsis, in the cactus family Cactaceae. It is native to Bolivia and northwestern Argentina.

== Description ==
Echinopsis tarijensis initially grows individually, later becoming a shrub with few side branches and reaching heights of growth of up to 5 m (16 ft). The strong, cylindrical, dark green shoots reach a diameter of up to 35 cm (14 in). There are 15 to 21 ribs. The large, clear areoles located on them are covered with gray felt and are close together. Light brown to whitish, unequal spines emerges from them. The stiff, stinging spines are slightly curved and thickened at their base. They have a length of 1 to 8 cm (0.4 to 3.1 in). One to four central spines and 50 or more radial spines are formed.

The funnel-shaped flowers are red to pink to creamy white. They appear near the top of the shoot. The flowers are up to 12 cm (5 in) long and have a diameter of 9 cm (3.5 in). The egg-shaped, green fruits are 3.5 to 5 cm (1.4 to 2.0 in) long and have a diameter of 2 to 3 cm (0.8 to 1.2 in).

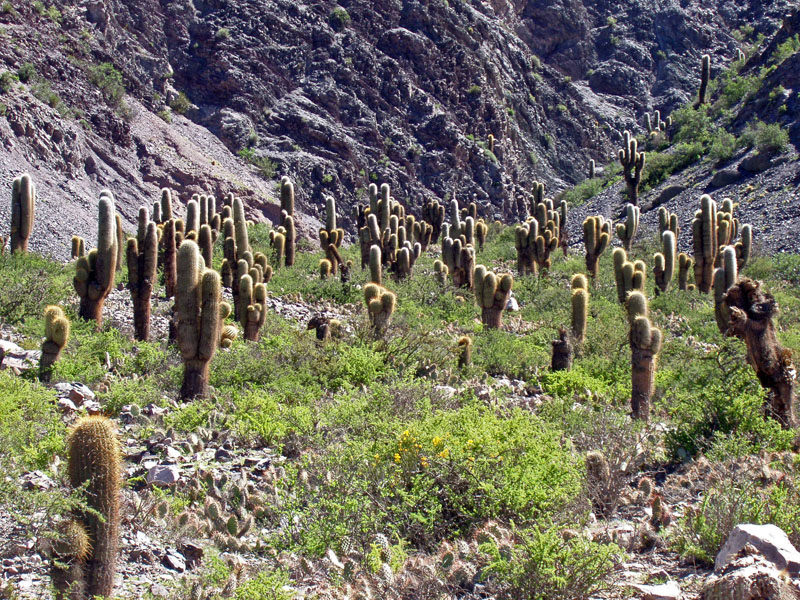
Habitat in Jujuy, Argentina

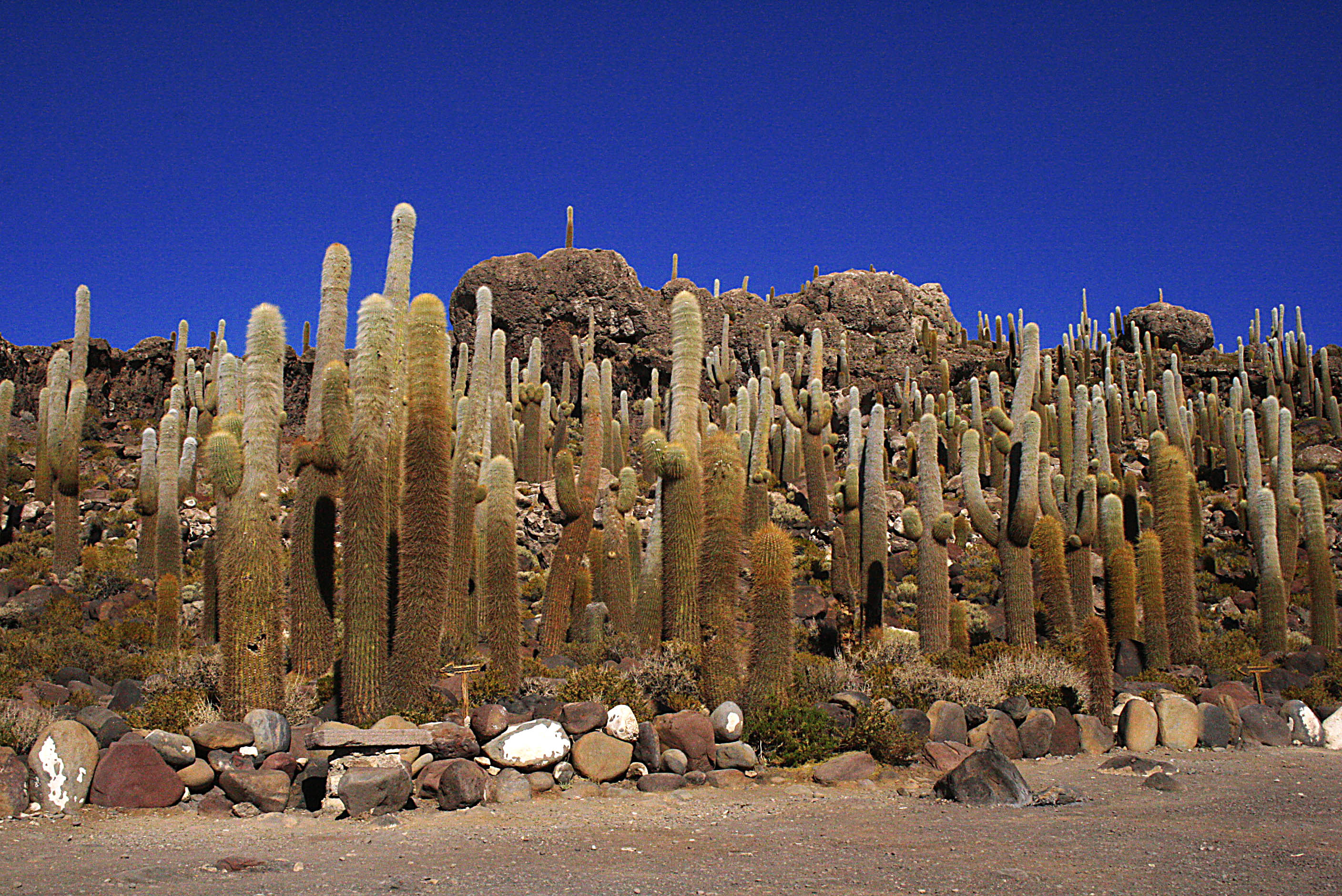
Habitat in Salar de Uyuni, Bolivia

== Taxonomy ==
The first description as Cereus tarijensis by Friedrich Vaupel was published in 1916. The specific epithet tarijensis refers to the occurrence of the species near Tarija in the Bolivian Department of Tarija. Spanish common names are "poco", "poco-poco", "achuma" and "cardón". The fruits are called "pasacana". In 1974, it was transferred to the genus Echinopsis. Boris O. Schlumpberger placed the species in the genus Soehrensia in 2012. As of February 2026, this placement was not accepted by Plants of the World Online, which retained it in Echinopsis.

=== Subspecies ===
It has 2 accepted subspecies:

Image	Subspecies	Description	Distribution
	Echinopsis tarijensis subsp. bertramiana (Backeb.) Schlumpb.	Plants are 2 meters tall with pink to magenta flowers.	Bolivia
	Echinopsis tarijensis subsp. tarijensis	Plants have white flowers	Bolivia to Argentina

== Distribution ==
Echinopsis tarijensis is widespread in the southwest and south of Bolivia and the Argentine province of Jujuy in the Andes at altitudes of 3,000 to 4,500 m (9,800 to 14,800 ft).
