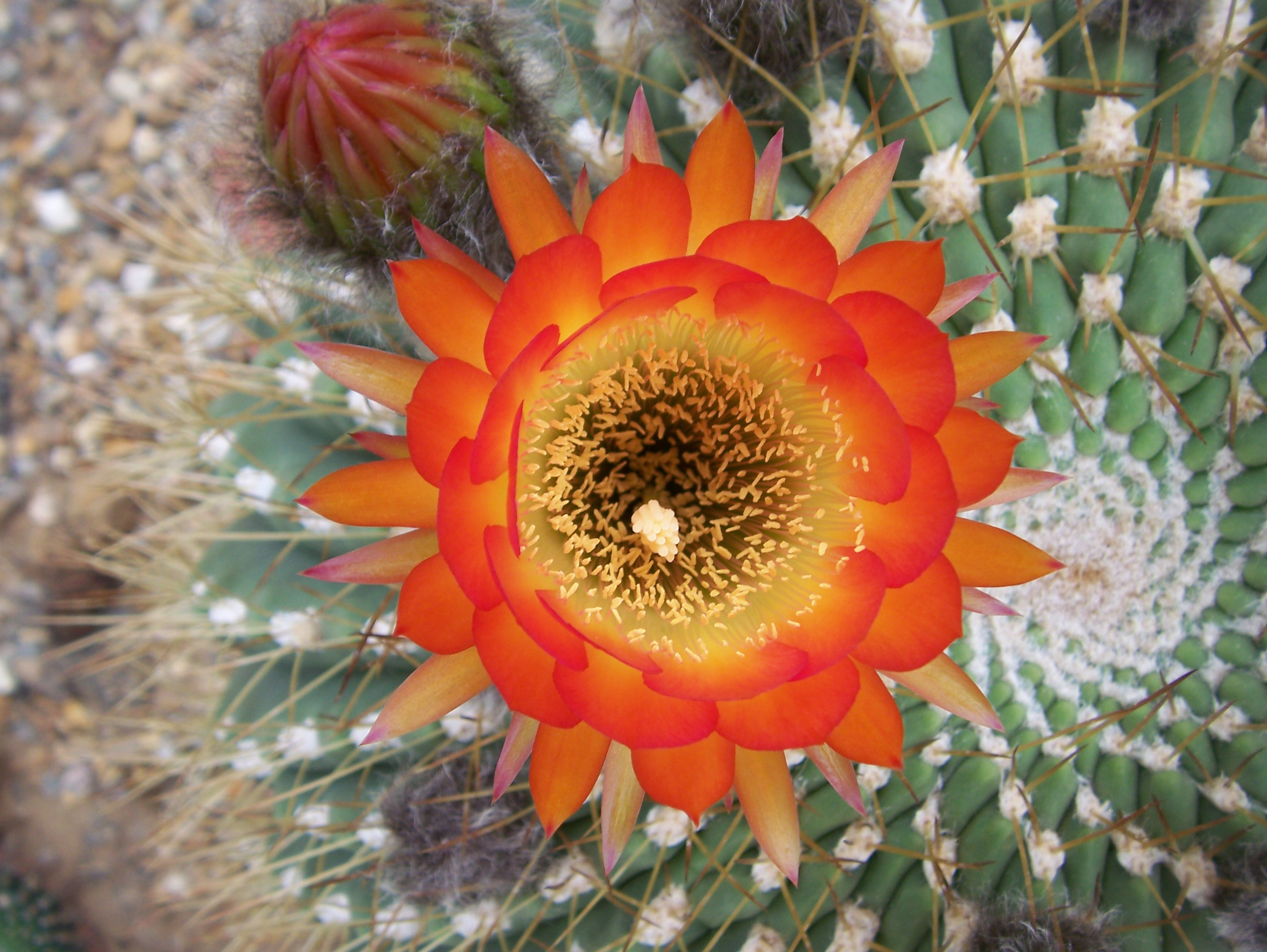

Scientific classification
- Kingdom: Plantae
- Clade: Tracheophytes
- Clade: Angiosperms
- Clade: Eudicots
- Order: Caryophyllales
- Family: Cactaceae
- Subfamily: Cactoideae
- Genus: Echinopsis
- Species: E. bruchii

Binomial name
- Echinopsis bruchii (Britton & Rose) H.Friedrich & Glaetzle

Synonyms
- List: Echinopsis formosa subsp. bruchii (Britton & Rose) M.Lowry; Echinopsis grandis (Britton & Rose) H.Friedrich & G.D.Rowley; Echinopsis ingens (Backeb.) H.Friedrich & G.D.Rowley; Eriosyce bruchii (Britton & Rose) Backeb.; Lobivia bruchii Britton & Rose; Lobivia bruchii var. nivalis Frič; Lobivia formosa subsp. bruchii (Britton & Rose) Rausch; Lobivia formosa subsp. grandis (Britton & Rose) Rausch; Lobivia formosa var. bruchii (Britton & Rose) Rausch; Lobivia formosa var. grandis (Britton & Rose) Rausch; Lobivia formosa var. nivalis (Frič) Rausch; Lobivia grandis Britton & Rose; Pseudolobivia grandis (Britton & Rose) Krainz; Soehrensia bruchii (Britton & Rose) Backeb.; Soehrensia bruchii var. albiflora Y.Itô, without type.; Soehrensia bruchii var. atropurpureiflora Y.Itô, without type.; Soehrensia bruchii var. aurantiiflora Y.Itô, without type.; Soehrensia bruchii var. aureorubriflora Y.Itô; Soehrensia bruchii var. roseiflora Y.Itô, without type.; Soehrensia bruchii var. roseorubriflora Y.Itô, without type.; Soehrensia grandis (Britton & Rose) Backeb.; Soehrensia ingens Backeb.; Trichocereus bruchii (Britton & Rose) F.Ritter; Trichocereus bruchii var. brevispinus F.Ritter; Trichocereus formosus subsp. bruchii (Britton & Rose) Guiggi; Trichocereus grandis (Britton & Rose) F.Ritter; Trichocereus ingens (Backeb.) F.Ritter

= Echinopsis bruchii =

Species of cactus

Echinopsis bruchii, synonym Soehrensia bruchii, is a species of Echinopsis found in Argentina.

== Description ==
Echinopsis bruchii usually grows solitary. The depressed globular shoots are dark green reach a diameter of 20-30 (50) cm and 50–70 cm (20–28 in) tall. There are 15-50 low, distinct ribs that are somewhat inflated or bumpy between the areoles. The areoles on it are white with 2-4 central spines and 8-10 radial spines that are yellowish or brown. The deep red flowers appear near the top of the shoots and open during the day. They are 4 to 5 cm (1.6 to 2.0 in) long and have the same diameter.

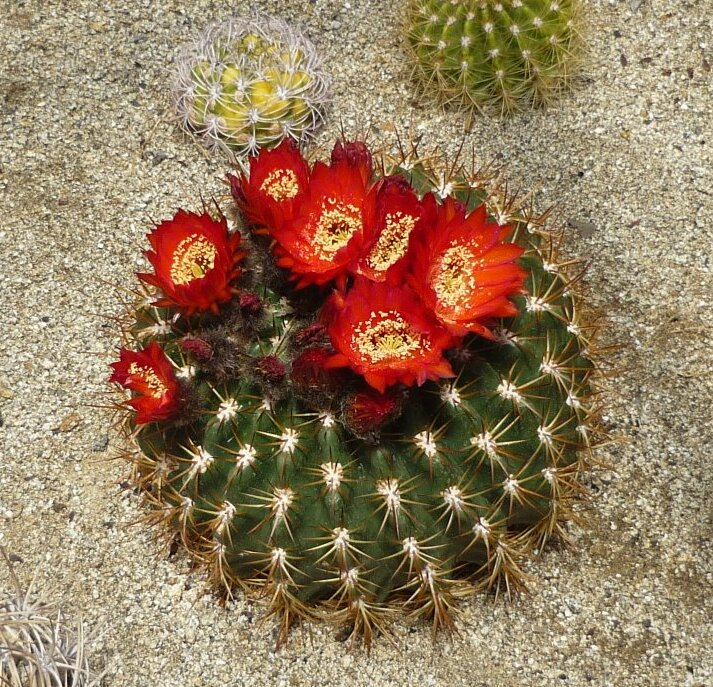

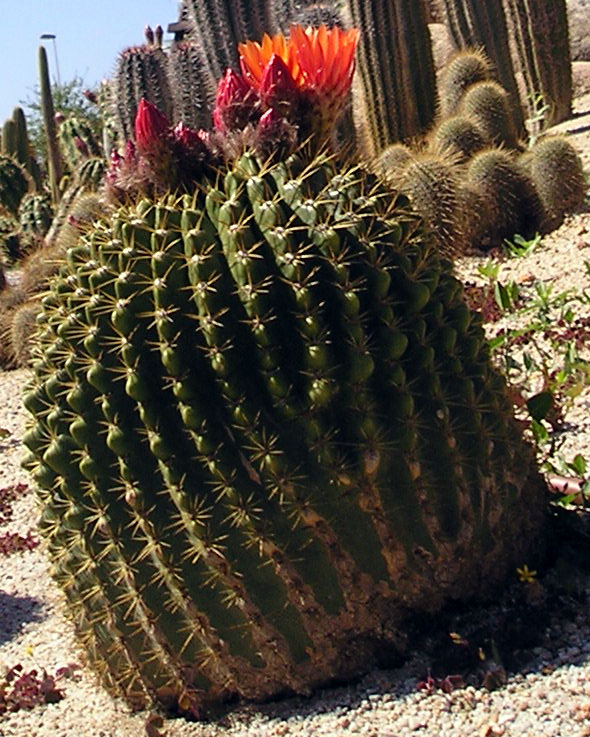

== Distribution ==
Plants are found growing in northwest Argentina, in Catamarca, Jujuy, La Rioja, Mendoza, Salta, and San Juan at elevations of 1,700 to 3,500 m (5,600 to 11,500 ft).
