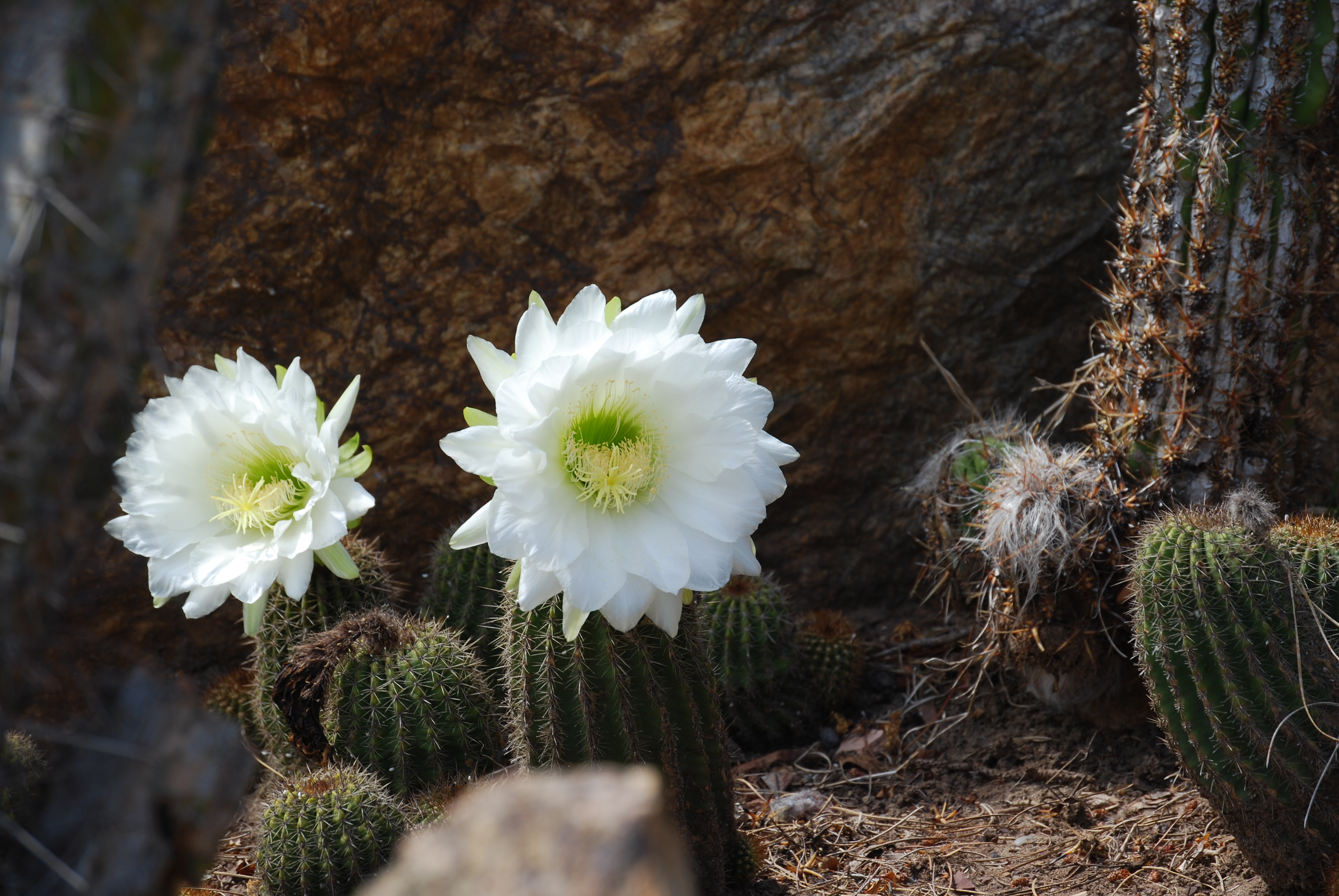

Conservation status
- Least Concern (IUCN 3.1)

Scientific classification
- Kingdom: Plantae
- Clade: Embryophytes
- Clade: Tracheophytes
- Clade: Spermatophytes
- Clade: Angiosperms
- Clade: Eudicots
- Order: Caryophyllales
- Family: Cactaceae
- Subfamily: Cactoideae
- Genus: Echinopsis
- Species: E. schickendantzii

Binomial name
- Echinopsis schickendantzii F.A.C.Weber

Synonyms
- Cereus schickendantzii (F.A.C.Weber) F.A.C.Weber ex K.Schum.; Echinopsis fabrisii (R.Kiesling) G.D.Rowley; Echinopsis manguinii (Backb.) H.Friedrich & G.D.Rowley; Soehrensia fabrisii (R.Kiesling) Schlumpb.; Soehrensia schickendantzii (F.A.C.Weber) Schlumpb.; Trichocereus fabrisii R.Kiesling; Trichocereus manguinii Backeb.; Trichocereus tenuispinus F.Ritter; Trichocereus schickendantzii (F.A.C. Weber) Britton & Rose; Trichocereus shaferi Britton & Rose; Trichocereus volcanensis F.Ritter

= Echinopsis schickendantzii =

Species of cactus

Echinopsis schickendantzii, synonyms including Soehrensia schickendantzii, is a cactus found in northwestern Argentina.

== Description ==
Echinopsis schickendantzii grows as a shrub, occasionally solitary, but usually branching out from the base and formin clumps. The cylindrical to elongated, shiny light green shoots are 15 to 25 cm (5.9 to 9.8 in) long and have diameters of up to 6 cm (2.4 in). There are 14 to 18 low and somewhat sharp ribs that are notched. The areoles on it are very close together and occasionally even touch. The yellowish thorns originating from the areoles are flexible and up to 1 cm (0.39 in) long. Four central spines are formed. Occasionally the number increases with age. There are nine marginal spines.

The hypanthium is tubular to funnel-shaped. White, unscented flowers appear near the top of the shoot and open at night. They are 20 to 22 cm (7.9 to 8.7 in) long. The flower tube is densely hairy black. The spherical, dark green fruits are sweet and tear open. They have a length of up to 6 cm (2.4 in) and a diameter of 5 cm (2.0 in).

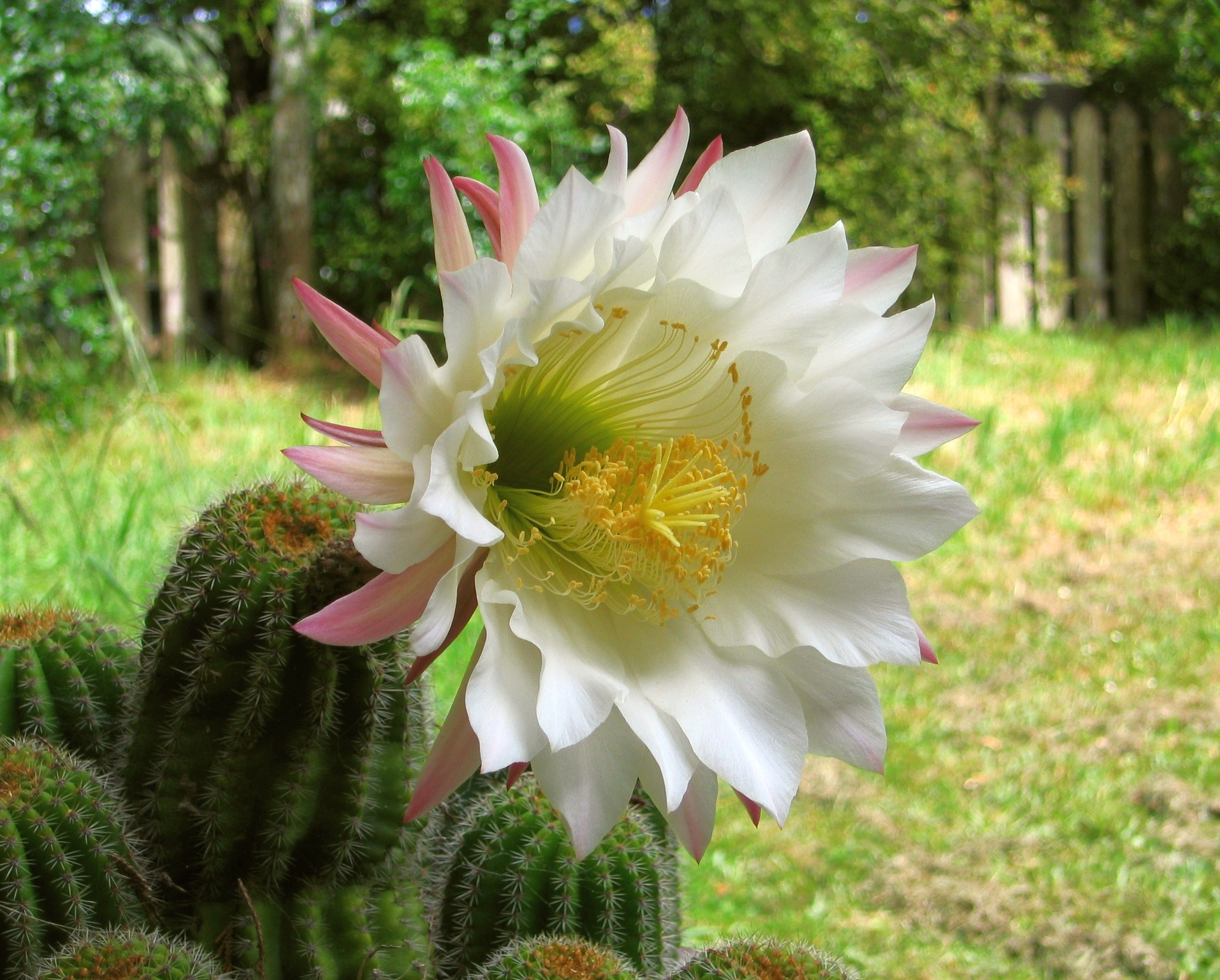
Flower

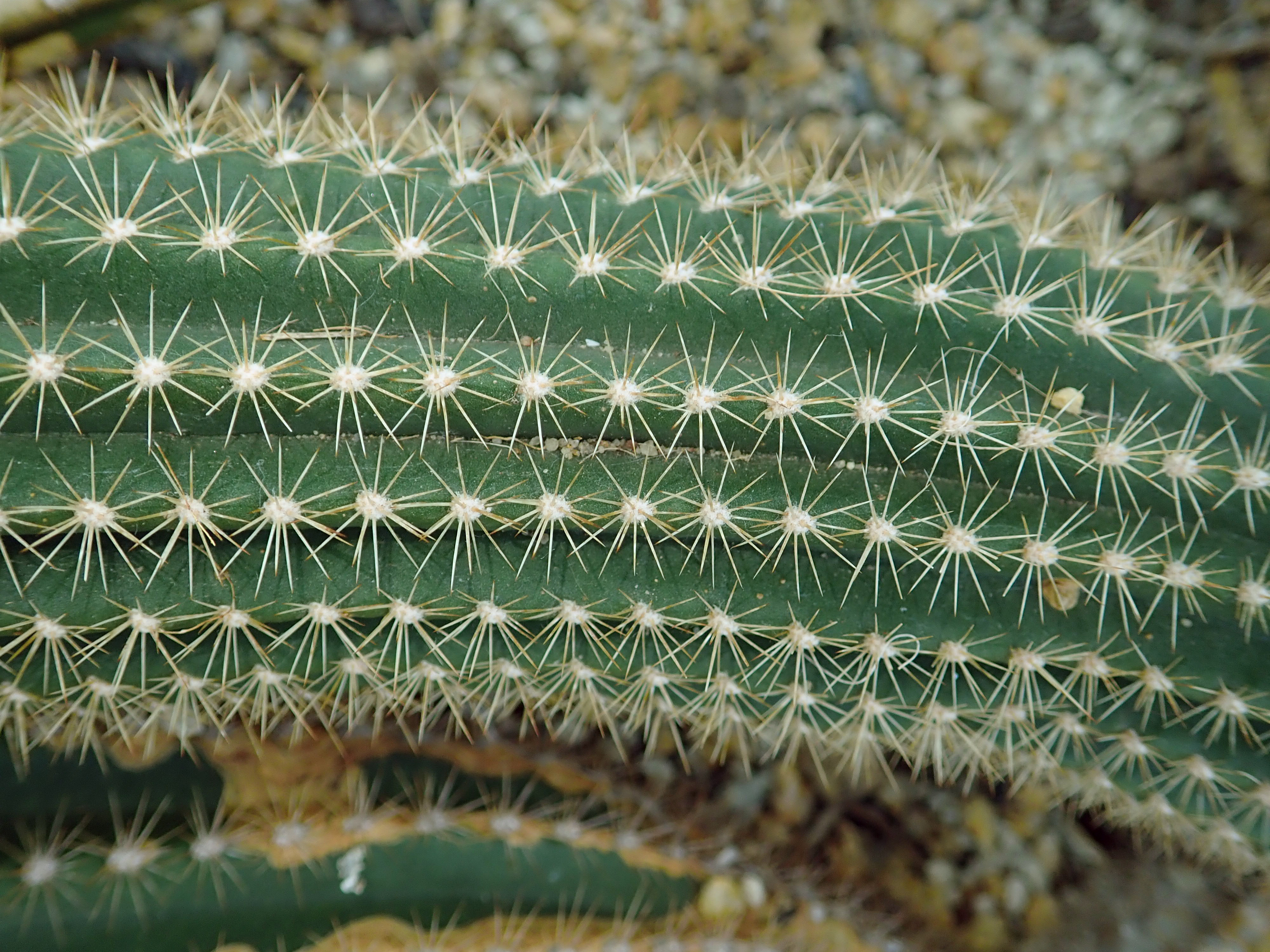
Spines

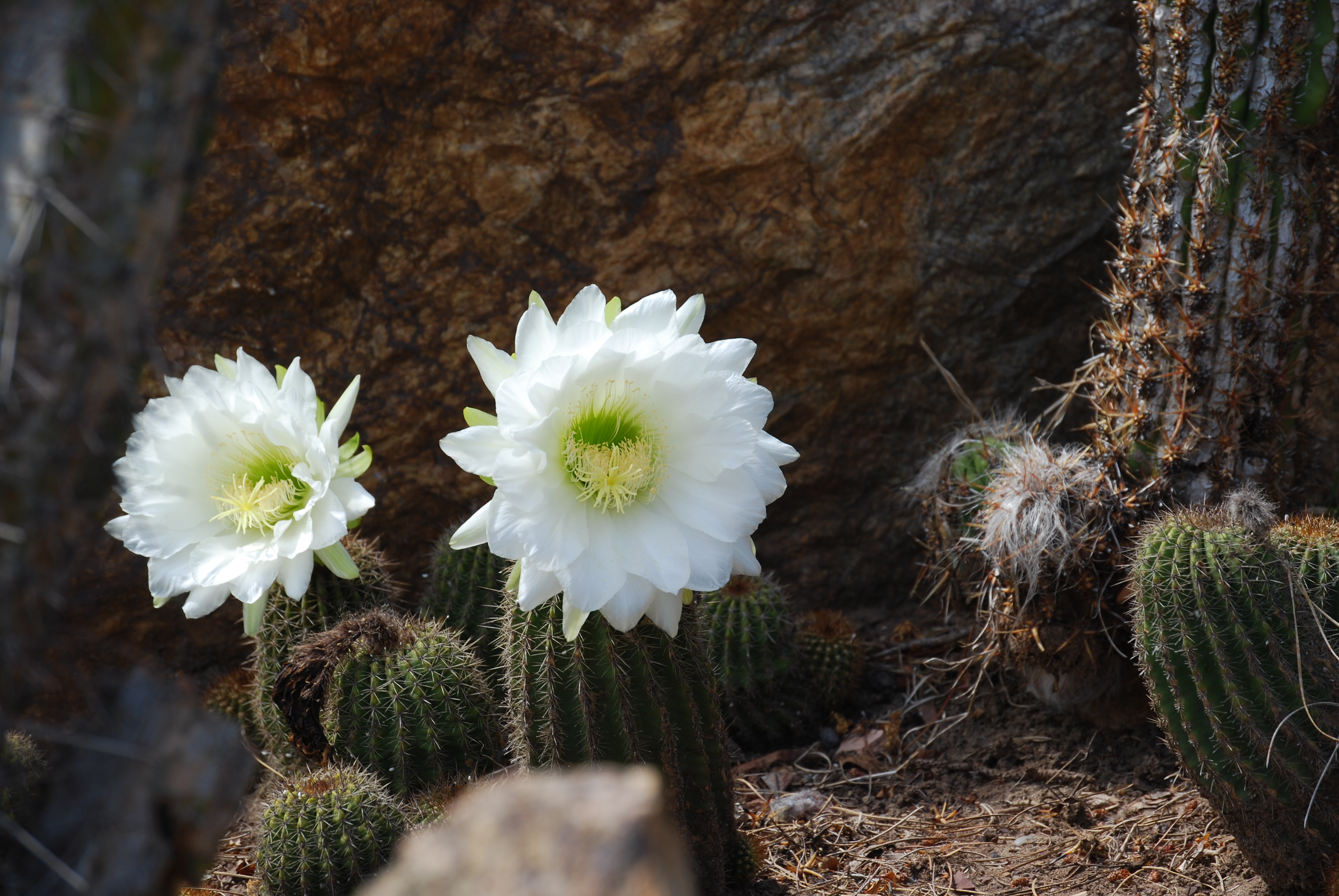
Plant

== Taxonomy ==
The plant was first described by Frédéric Albert Constantin Weber in 1896 as Echinopsis schickendantzii. Boris Oliver Schlumpberger transferred it to the genus Soehrensia in 2012. The Latin epithet schickendantzii honors the German chemist Friedrich Schickendantz (1837–1896), who emigrated to Argentina in 1861. As of February 2026, Plants of the World Online retained the species in the genus Echinopsis.

== Distribution ==
Echinopsis schickendantzii is native to northwestern Argentina. Plants are found in the provinces of Salta, Catamarca, Jujuy and Tucumán. Some sources also state that it occurs in Bolivia in the departments of Tarija, Chuquisaca and Santa Cruz at elevations of 1,600 to 3,200 m (5,200 to 10,500 ft). Plants are found growing in high elevation grassland and Yungas forest.
