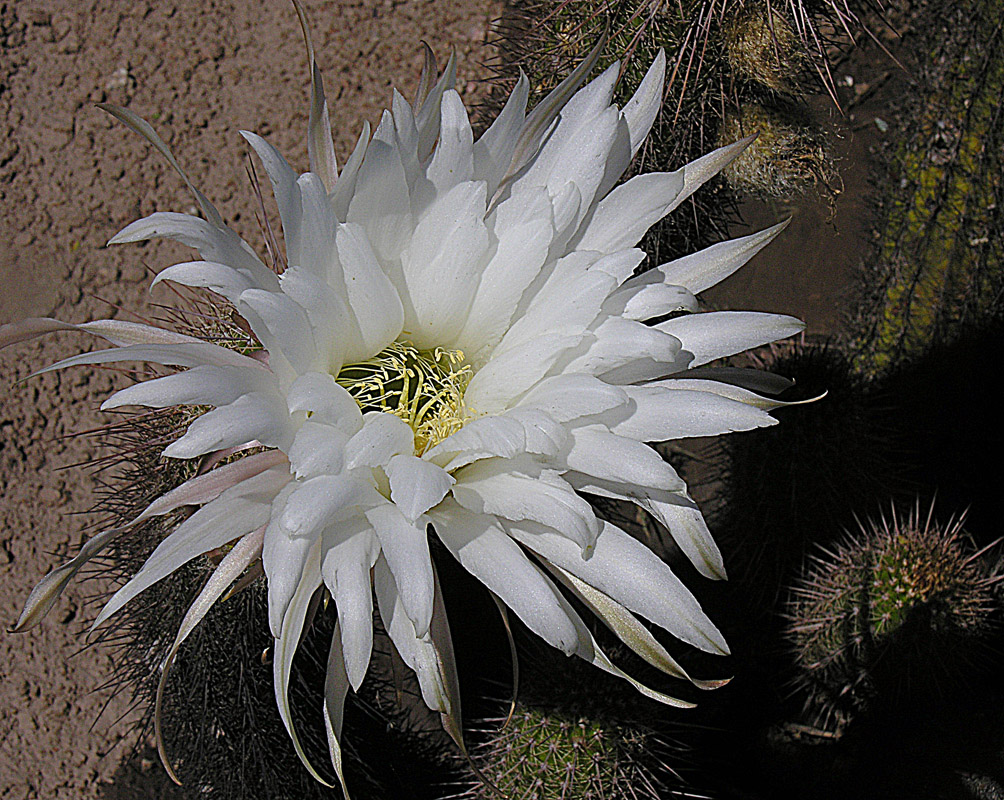

Conservation status
- Least Concern (IUCN 3.1)

Scientific classification
- Kingdom: Plantae
- Clade: Tracheophytes
- Clade: Angiosperms
- Clade: Eudicots
- Order: Caryophyllales
- Family: Cactaceae
- Subfamily: Cactoideae
- Genus: Echinopsis
- Species: E. strigosa

Binomial name
- Echinopsis strigosa (Salm-Dyck) H.Friedrich & G.D.Rowley

Synonyms
- Cereus intricatus Salm-Dyck; Cereus myriophyllus Gillies ex Otto; Cereus strigosus Salm-Dyck; Cereus strigosus var. intricatus (Salm-Dyck) F.A.C.Weber ex K.Schum.; Cereus strigosus var. longispinus W.Maass; Cereus strigosus var. rufispinus Hook.f.; Echinocereus intricatus (Salm-Dyck) Sencke ex Haage; Echinocereus strigosus (Salm-Dyck) Haage; Echinocereus strigosus var. rufispinus Rümpler; Echinocereus strigosus var. spinosior Rümpler; Soehrensia strigosa (Salm-Dyck) Schlumpb.; Trichocereus strigosus (Salm-Dyck) Britton & Rose; Trichocereus strigosus var. flaviflorus F.Ritter; Trichocereus strigosus var. longispinus (C.A.Maass) Borg

= Echinopsis strigosa =

Species of cactus

Echinopsis strigosa, synonym Soehrensia strigosa, is a species of Echinopsis in the cactus family. It is native to northwestern Argentina.

== Description ==
Echinopsis strigosa grows shrubby, branching out from the base and forming dense clumps up to 1 m (3.3 ft) in diameter. The cylindrical, erect or ascending shoots have a diameter of 5 to 6 cm (2.0 to 2.4 in) and are up to 60 cm (24 in) long. There are 15 to 18 very low and blunt ribs. The circular, large areoles located on them are initially white and are up to 0.8 cm (0.3 in) apart. The numerous, finely needle-like, whitish to yellowish to reddish-brown spines that emerge from them are occasionally darker-tipped. The approximately four central spines are up to 7 cm (2.8 in) long. The nine to 16 radial spines are slightly shorter.

The funnel-shaped, white flowers open at dusk and stay open most of the following day. They are up to 20 cm (8 in) long and have a diameter of 15 cm (6 in). The spherical, yellow to orange fruits are fleshy and 4 to 6.5 cm (1.6 to 2.6 in) long.

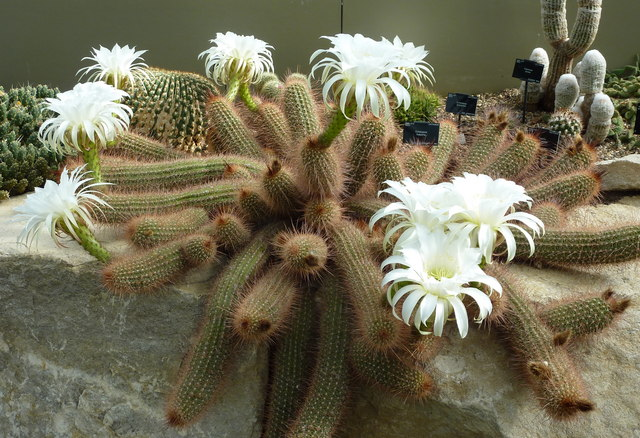
habit

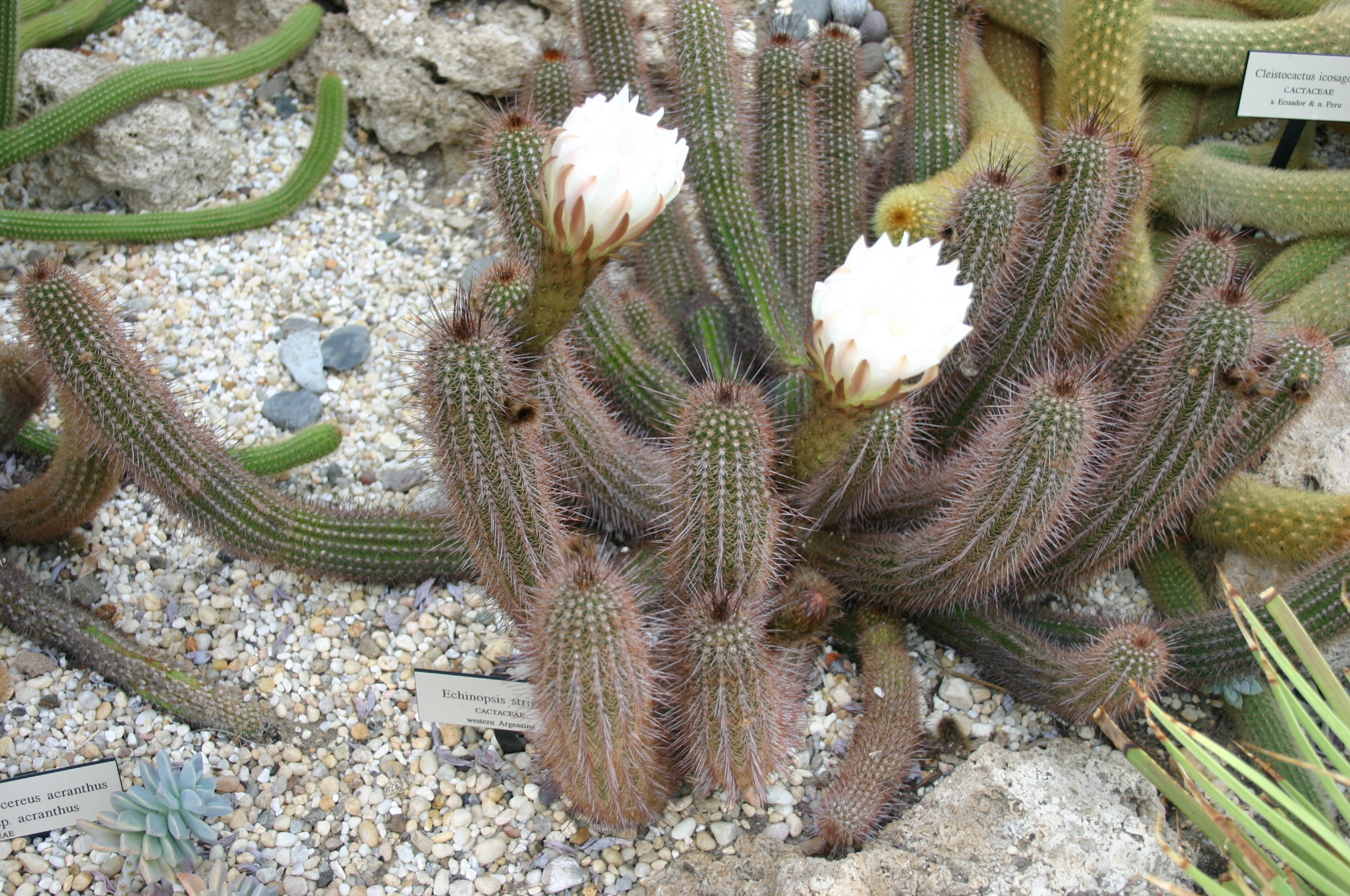

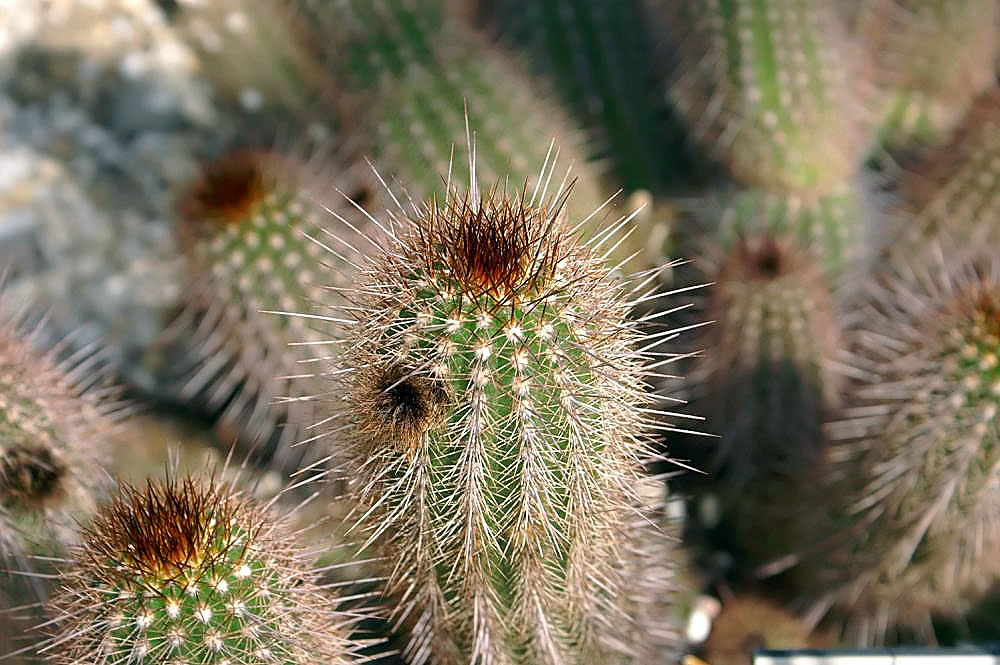

== Taxonomy ==
The first description as Cereus strigosus by Joseph zu Salm-Reifferscheidt-Dyck was published in 1834. In 1974, it was transferred to the genus Echinopsis. In 2012, Boris O. Schlumpberger placed the species in the genus Soehrensia. As of February 2026, Plants of the World Online retained it in Echinopsis.

== Distribution ==
Echinopsis strigosa is native to northwestern Argentina. It is widespread in the provinces of Salta, Tucumán, Catamarca, La Rioja, San Juan and Mendoza in the montane vegetation at lower altitudes from 700 to 2000 meters.
