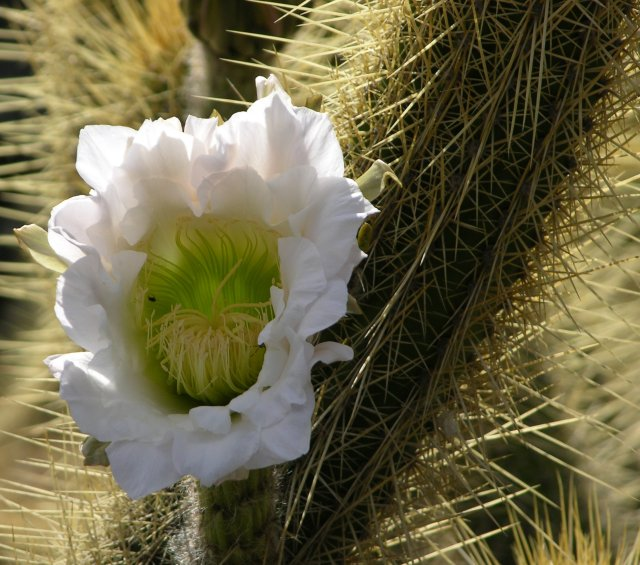

Conservation status
- Least Concern (IUCN 3.1)

Scientific classification
- Kingdom: Plantae
- Clade: Tracheophytes
- Clade: Angiosperms
- Clade: Eudicots
- Order: Caryophyllales
- Family: Cactaceae
- Subfamily: Cactoideae
- Genus: Echinopsis
- Species: E. camarguensis

Binomial name
- Echinopsis camarguensis (Cárdenas) H.Friedrich & G.D.Rowley

Synonyms
- Soehrensia camarguensis (Cárdenas) Schlumpb.; Trichocereus camarguensis Cárdenas

= Echinopsis camarguensis =

Species of cactus

Echinopsis camarguensis, synonym Soehrensia camarguensis, is a species of Echinopsis found in Bolivia.

== Description ==
Echinopsis camarguensis grows as a shrub with columnar, cylindrical and light green shoots, which often consist of several curved, ascending branches and are up to 50 cm (20 in) high. There are eleven to 15 very low ribs present. The needle-like thorns emerging from the areoles are yellow to greyish. The two to three (rarely up to five) central spines have a length of up to 5 cm (2.0 in). The twelve to 13 radiating radial spines are up to 3 cm (1.2 in) long.

The funnel-shaped, white flowers open at night, and can grow 18 to 20 cm (7.1 to 7.9 in) long. The spherical to ovoid fruits have a diameter of up to 2 cm (0.79 in).

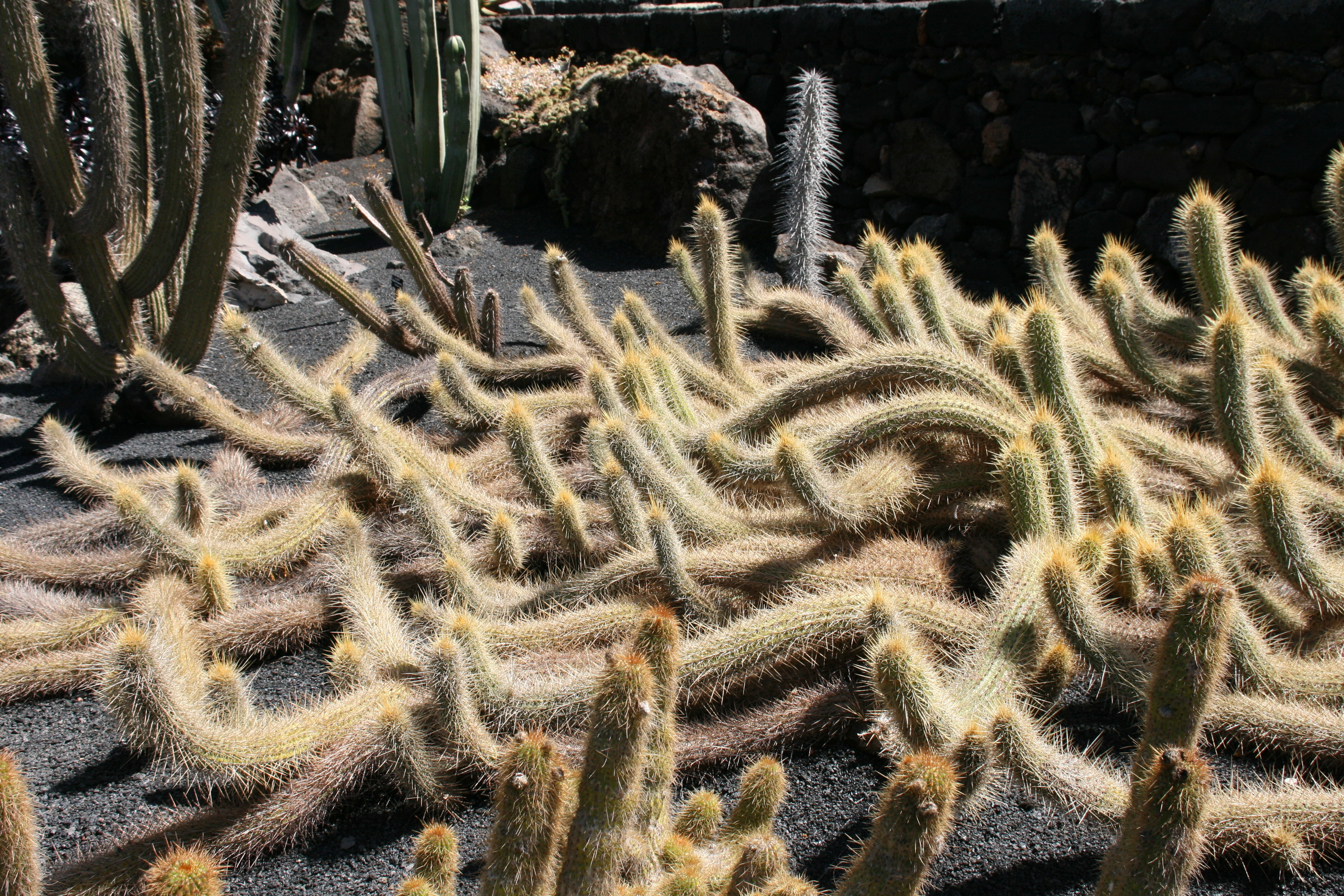

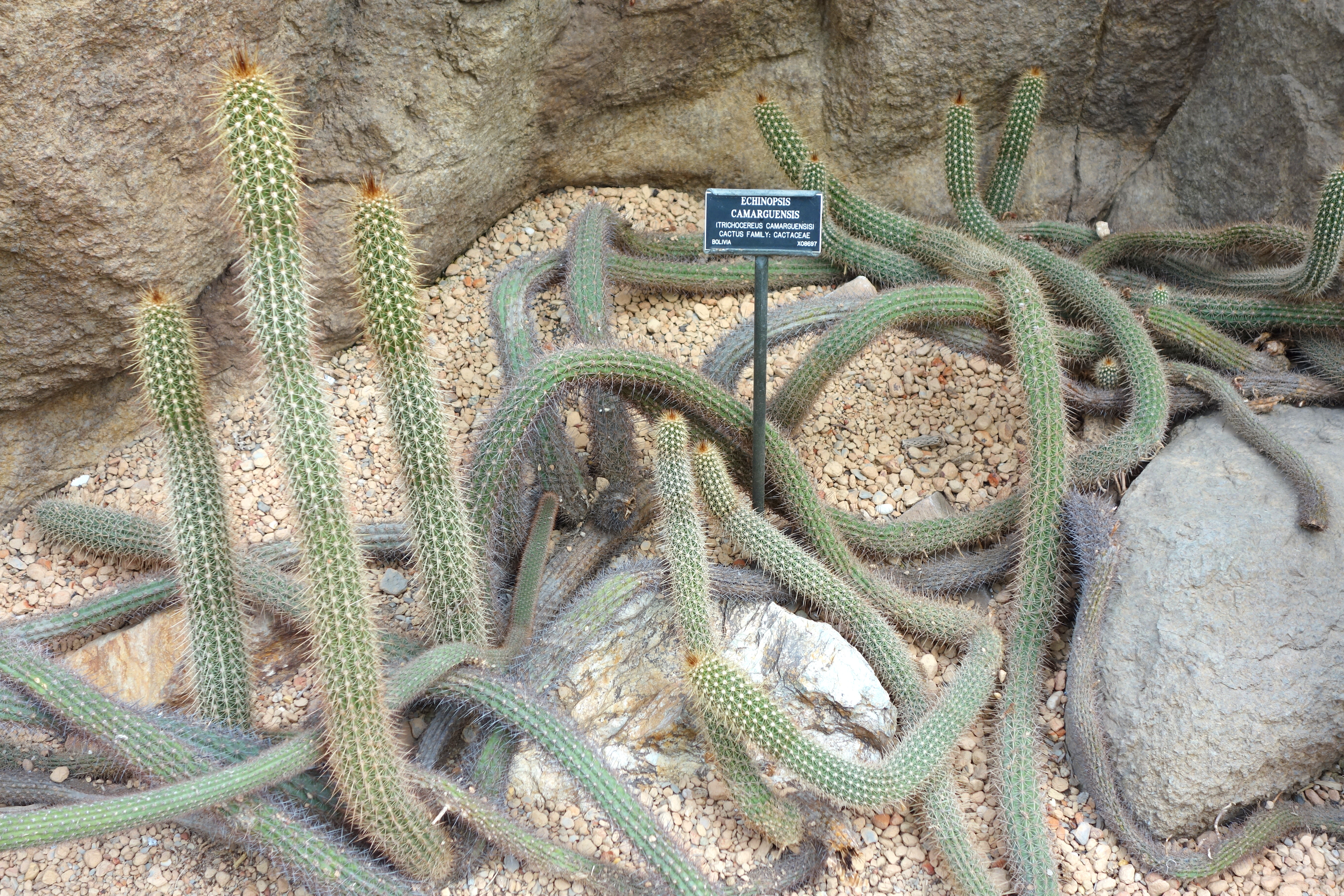

== Taxonomy ==
The plant was first described as Trichocereus camarguensis by Martín Cárdenas in 1953. It has also been placed in the genus Soehrensia. As of February 2026, Plants of the World Online placed it in the genus Echinopsis.

== Distribution ==
Echinopsis camarguensis is native to Bolivia. It is distributed in the Bolivian departments of Chuquisaca, Potosí and Tarija at altitudes of 2,700 m (8,900 ft).
