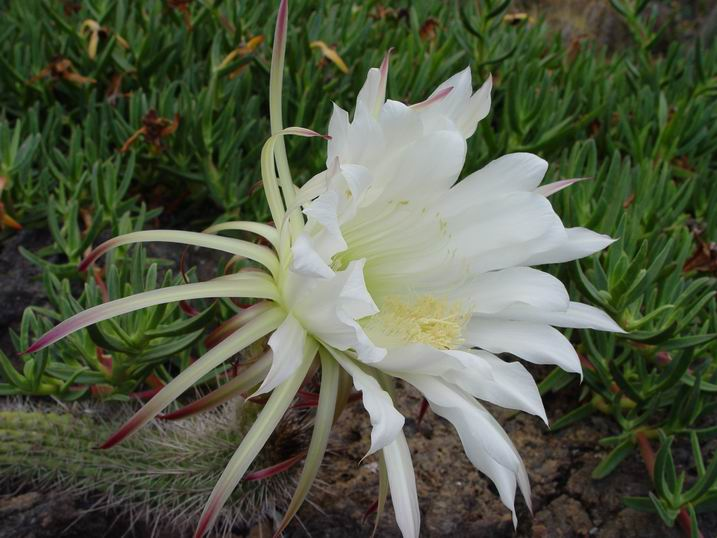

Conservation status
- Vulnerable (IUCN 3.1)

Scientific classification
- Kingdom: Plantae
- Clade: Tracheophytes
- Clade: Angiosperms
- Clade: Eudicots
- Order: Caryophyllales
- Family: Cactaceae
- Subfamily: Cactoideae
- Genus: Echinopsis
- Species: E. thelegona

Binomial name
- Echinopsis thelegona (F.A.C.Weber) H.Friedrich & G.D.Rowley

Synonyms
- Cereus thelegonus F.A.C.Weber; Soehrensia thelegona (F.A.C.Weber) Schlumpb.; Trichocereus thelegonus (F.A.C.Weber) Britton & Rose

= Echinopsis thelegona =

Species of cactus

Echinopsis thelegona is a species of cactus in the Echinopsis genus.

== Description ==
Echinopsis thelegona grows as a shrub with few branches. The tips of the prostrate to creeping shoots are slightly raised or erect. The cylindrical, dark green shoots have a diameter of 7 to 8 cm (2.8 to 3.1 in) and are up to 2 m (7 ft) long. There are about 12 low ribs, which are resolved into conspicuous hexagonal cusps. The areoles on the tips of the humps are circular. Light yellow thorns emerge from them, which turn gray with age and often have a darker tip. The individual central spine protrudes and is 2 to 4 cm (0.8 to 1.6 in) long. The six to seven needle-like marginal spines are spread out and are 1 to 2 cm (0.4 to 0.8 in) long. The lowest marginal spines are the longest.

The funnel-shaped, white flowers open at night. They are up to 20 cm (8 in) long and have a diameter of 15 cm (6 in). Its flower tube is covered with reddish bristles and hairs. The spherical to egg-shaped, yellowish to reddish fruits are tuberous and tear open. They have a diameter of up to 5 cm (2.0 in).

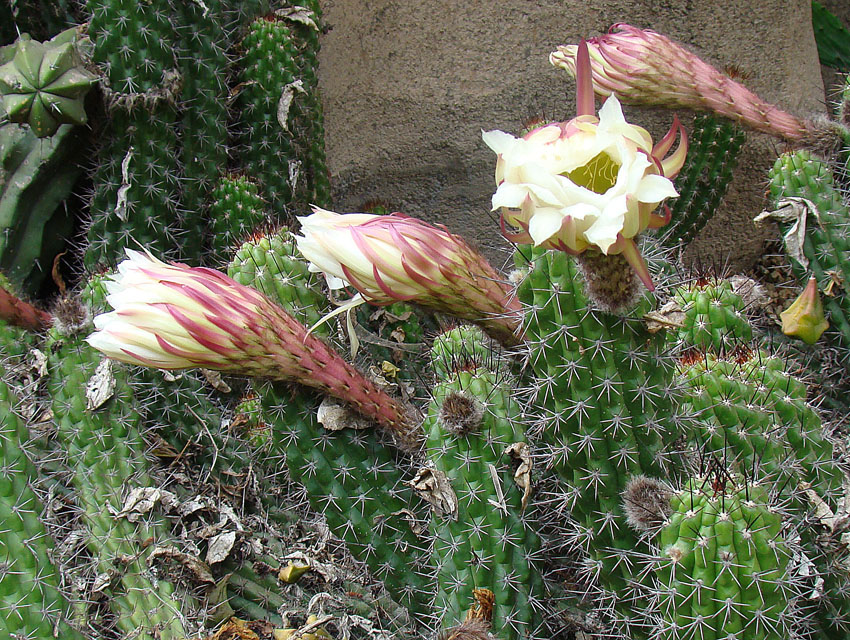
Blooming plant

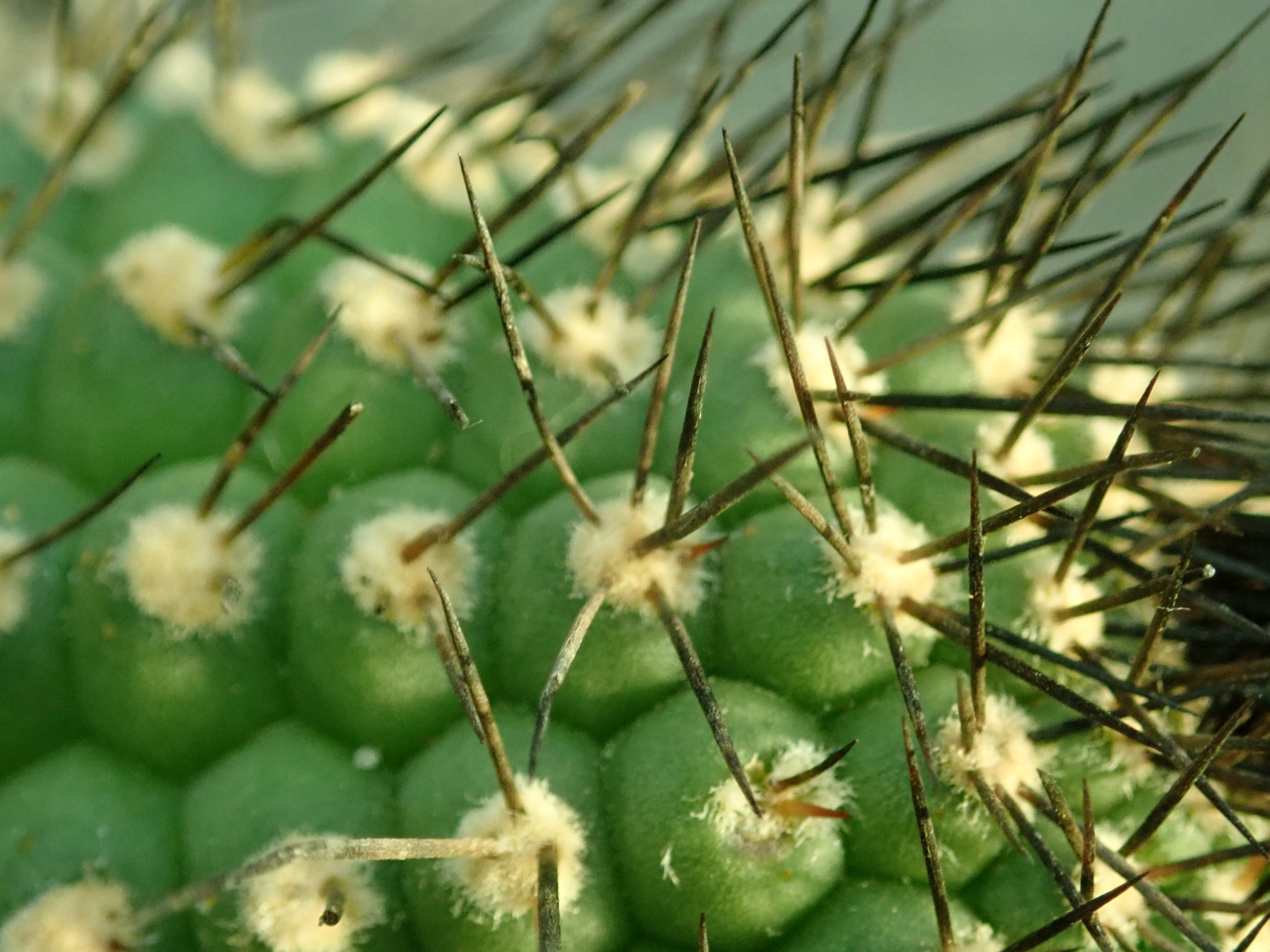
Spines

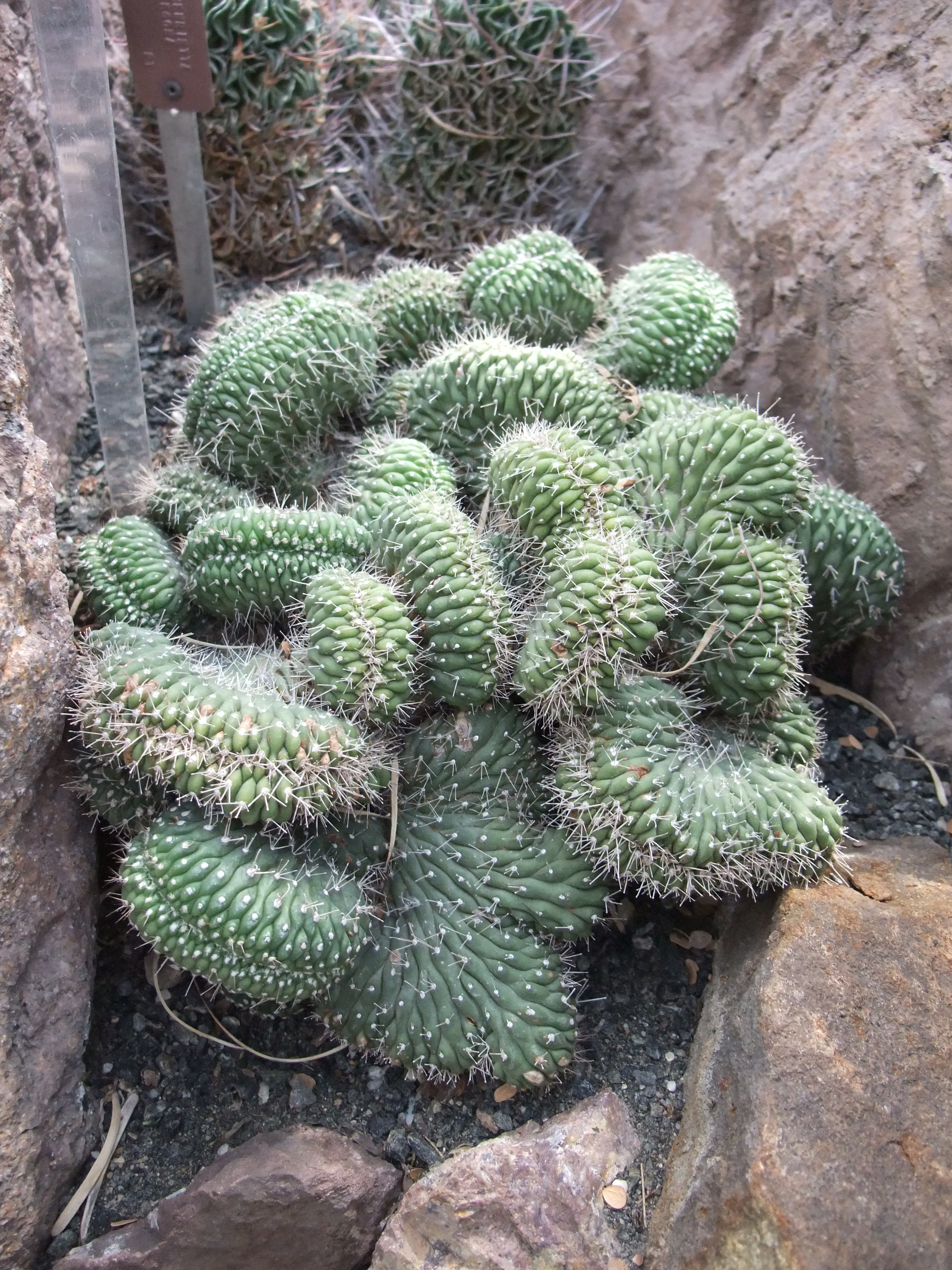
Crested plant

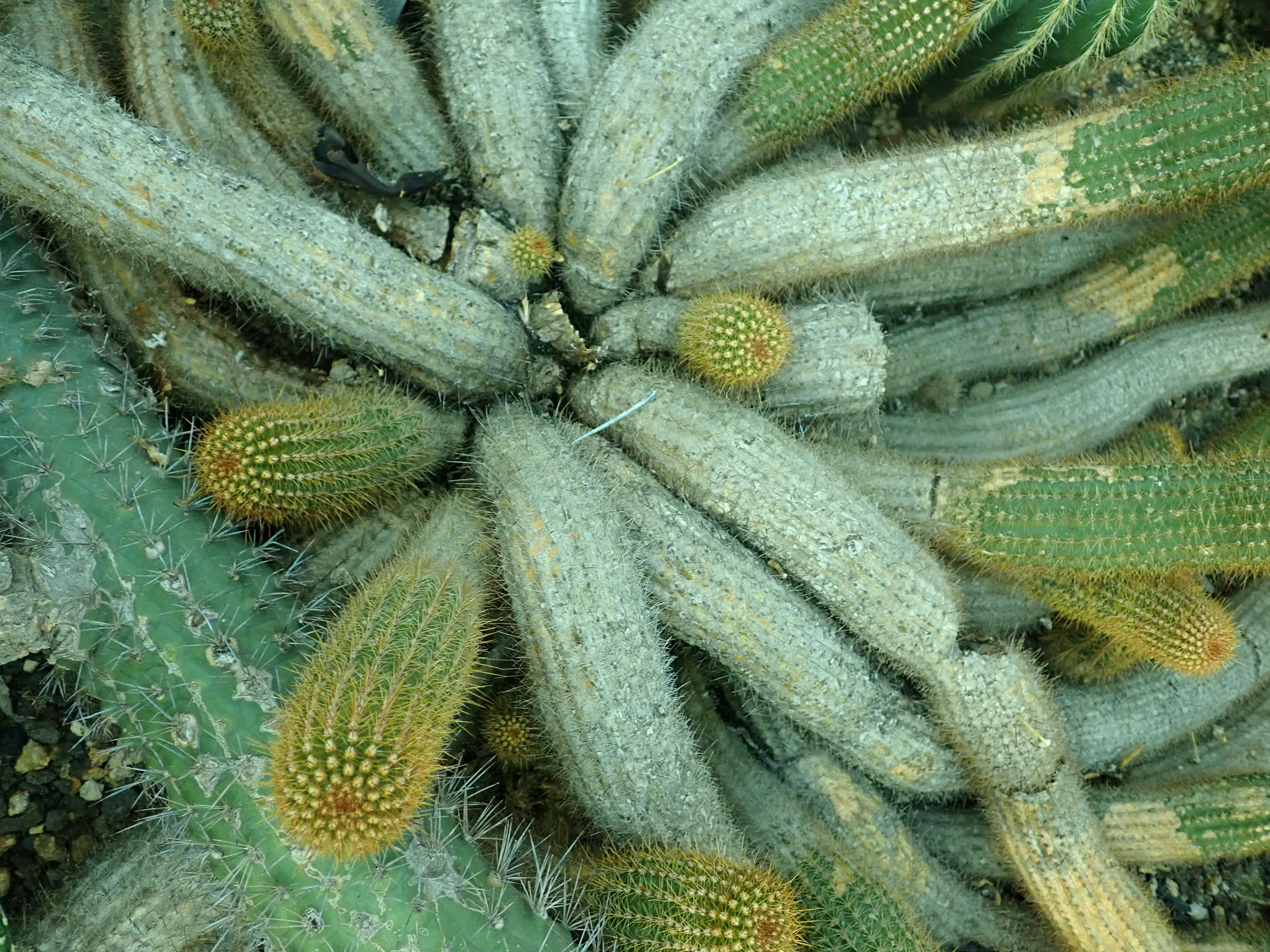
Plant

== Taxonomy ==
The first description as Cereus thelegonus by Frédéric Albert Constantin Weber was published in 1897. The specific epithet thelegona is derived from the Greek words thele for 'wart' and gonia for 'edge' and refers to the tuberous ribs of the species. It was transferred to Soehrensia as Soehrensia thelegona in 2012 by Boris O. Schlumpberger. As of February 2026, Plants of the World Online placed it in the genus Echinopsis.

== Distribution ==
It is native to northwestern Argentina, and can be found in a small range that occurs in the provinces of Tucumán, Salta and Jujuy at altitudes of 500 to 1000 meters.
