= Crime in Puerto Rico =

Puerto Rico
- Crime rates* (2020)

Violent crimes
- Homicide: 16.7
- Rape: 4.7
- Robbery: 37.3
- Aggravated assault: 105.8

Property crimes
- Burglary: 93.4
- Larceny-theft: 263.1
- Motor vehicle theft: 62.6
- Note: Reported crimes per 100,000 population Source: FBI Crime Data Explorer

Crime in Puerto Rico describes acts of violent and non-violent crime that take place within the Commonwealth of Puerto Rico. Among all territories of the United States, Puerto Rico has one of the highest crime rates.

To combat crime, the government of Puerto Rico adopted a broad anti-crime policy referred to as the "iron fist against crime" (locally mano dura contra el crimen) – or simply the "iron fist" (mano dura). In 1993, Governor Pedro Rosselló summed up government efforts by remarking, "They have asked for war, and war they shall have. Let every criminal know: Our patience has ended". However, even after adopting the multiple anti-crime measures, violent crime stayed too high. In 2006, for instance, the island reported 736 murders.

In the early twenty-first century police corruption facilitated drug related crimes; it resulted in the arrest of over thirty Puerto Rico law enforcement agents. It came at a time when Puerto Rico ranked sixth worldwide in murders per capita. To counteract, federal law enforcement agencies, including the U.S. Coast Guard and the Drug Enforcement Administration (DEA), coordinated efforts with the Puerto Rico Police Department (PRPD) and other local agencies. The increased law enforcement efforts and tactics and equipment used led to popular criticism about a fundamental militarization of the police in the island.

== Crimes by decade ==
=== Crime before the 1980s ===
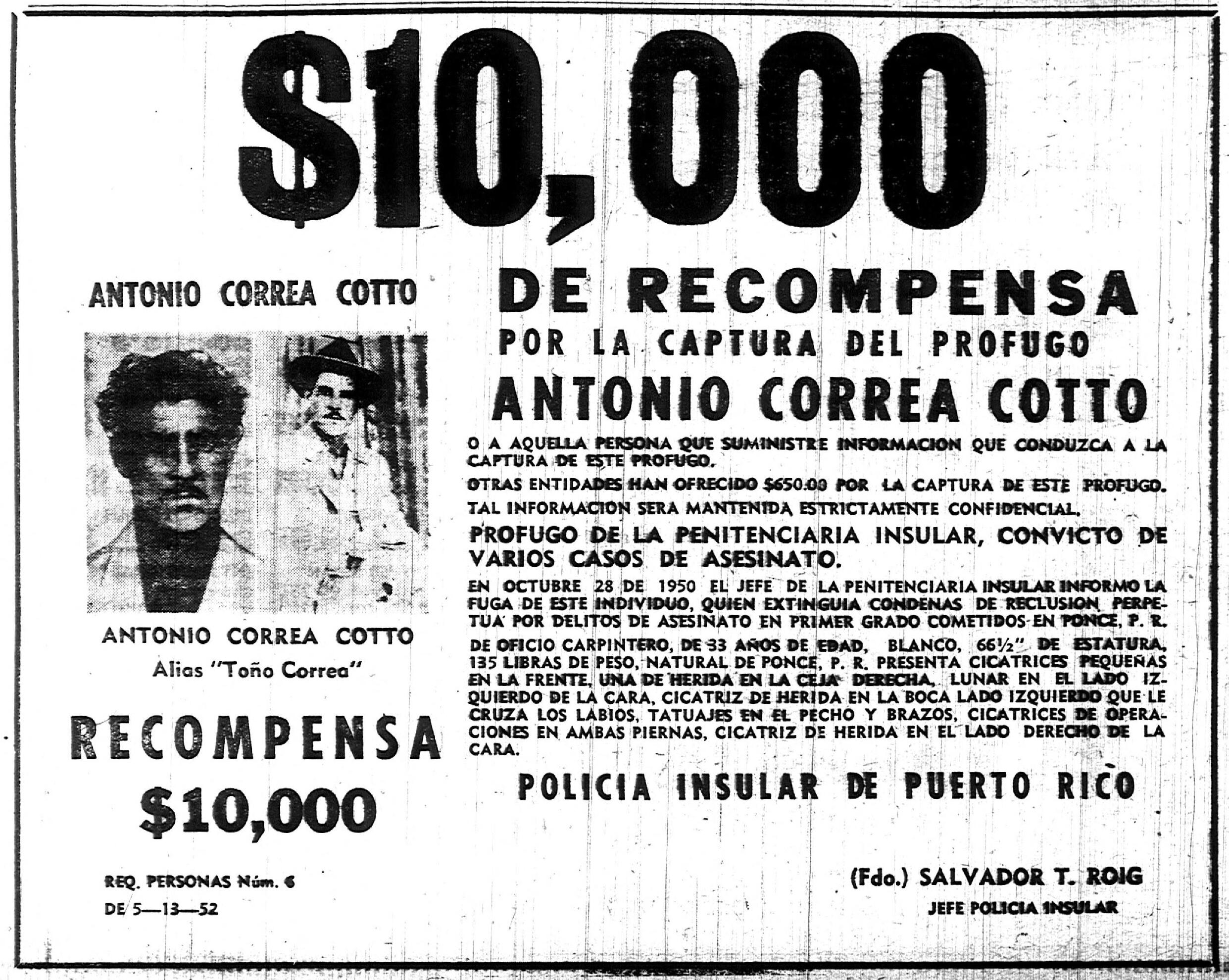
The $10,000 Correa Cotto bounty reward (equivalent to $120,000 in 2025) advertised in a May 1952 issue of El Imparcial

Antonio Correa Cotto was a notorious 1950s Puerto Rican criminal. On January 25, 1950, he murdered two people in Machuelo Abajo, Ponce, Puerto Rico. After being caught, prosecuted and sentenced to prison, he managed to escape and returned to Ponce where he killed 10 more people. Correa Coto was killed shortly after in a shootout with police. At least one significant robbery also took place after the 1950s ended.

More recently, the Government of Puerto Rico has combated the illegal drug trade and the resulting crime since the mid-1970s, with increasing law enforcement efforts over multiple decades contributing to a cycle of violence in which both demand and supply of illegal substances remain considerable.

Though recreational drug use was uncommon in Puerto Rico in the 1950s, it markedly increased in the 1960s. By the following decade, said increase in usage, particularly among those under the age of 25, became a major concern in Puerto Rican society. Estimates found that up to seventy thousand islanders were substance abusers. A number of drug cartels discovered that Puerto Rico functioned as an efficient transfer point while trafficking contraband such as cocaine to the mainland United States, and has been a magnet for organized crime for several decades.

A major focus on crime and, specifically, drug-related problems arose in Puerto Rican politics out of those events. A 1975 survey found that 87% of respondents believed that violence had recently increased to a serious extent. Beside mentioning "vice", however, inflation and lack of employment attracted notice as causes of Puerto Rican crime as well.

=== Crime in the 1980s ===
The existence of apparent 'no man's land' areas, in which all manner of criminal activity could take place without any sort of police control, among particularly lower-class communities caused widespread concern. The use of automatic weapons and other arms to directly fight back against law enforcement became a particular problem as well. From 1993 to 1996, the government confiscated a total of 10,017 illegal firearms during their efforts. As well, the total number of murders in Puerto Rico nearly doubled from 1987 to 1994— increasing from 509 to 995, respectively. These trends received massive interest in the island's news media.

=== Crime in the 1990s ===
Perceptions about widespread crime triggered political turmoil and sustained pressure for the authorities to change their approaches, often involving a doubling-down of anti-drug crackdowns. In the early 1990s, notably, law enforcement began specifically targeting white collar drug users. A government chief of staff remarked that the police had witnessed "housewives who go to these [drug distribution] spots with their children in the car" and vowed to send a strong message.

The broad, strict approach of the island's government has been known as the "iron fist" (Spanish: mano dura contra el crimen or simply mano dura). In 1993, Governor Pedro Rosselló summed up government efforts by remarking, "They have asked us for war and war is what they will get. Let the criminal know: our pateince has run out." (Spanish: Nos han pedido guerra y guerra tendrán. Que lo sepa el criminal: nuestra paciencia se acabó.). During the first month of that year alone, a total of 104 murders took place. Specific changes in the anti-crime efforts have included assigning police officers with more weapons and targeted intervention of the National Guard in certain places.

However, Puerto Rican efforts generally proved inadequate in stopping widespread drug trafficking in the latter part of the 20th century. The government had not just expanded employment levels and general funding for jailing and policing but also undergone a kind of militarization in its organization. Specific strategies included longer sentences for criminals, increased funding for officer equipment, and the construction of new prisons. From 1992 to 1998, the island's budget for policing approximately doubled. Yet progress remained mostly elusive. Public opinion viewed the island's law enforcement situation in critical terms. In 1997, a major national poll found that a 68% majority believed that crime had gotten "much worse" over the previous five years.

In response to pervasive crime, local law enforcement attempted to integrate their efforts with U.S. federal agencies, especially with fighting trafficking in mind. The U.S. Coast Guard and Drug Enforcement Administration (DEA) both reinforced their presence on the island during the 1990s, setting up connections that remained years later. Nonetheless, challenges such as police corruption have frequently complicated matters as different groups attempt to work with each other. The Puerto Rico Police Department (PRPD), the territory's primary law enforcement agency, has been tarnished by multiple scandals over officer misconduct up to and including outright criminal activity.

=== Crime in the 2000s ===
One of the biggest law enforcement corruption busts in U.S. history took place in 2001 on the island. Twenty-nine police officers were caught on videotape drug trafficking thanks to an undercover operation initiated by the Federal Bureau of Investigation (FBI). Coming after authorities suspected local police of direct involvement in drug dealing, some officers even being bold enough to sell heroin from their squad cars, the bust additionally aimed to stop the illicit protection provided to certain cocaine dealers who shipped their contraband throughout the island. Known as Operation Lost Honor, a total of thirty-two individuals were arrested in the case. Orlando Sentinel journalist Ivan Roman stated that the bust "stunned a department already reeling from a series of" previous scandals.

As well, four Puerto Rican officers were arrested in 2008 by the FBI, including the director of the island's Extradition Division, for extortion as well as the distribution of both cocaine and heroin. The EFE World News Service stated in a report that the arrested "took advantage of the authority of their uniforms". Between 1993 and 2000, the PRPD kicked out a full one thousand officers due to a variety of criminal charges. Between 2003 and 2007, a hundred officers had been under investigation, with seventy-five others convicted under the jurisdiction of the U.S. federal court system.

Then Police Superintendent Pedro Toledo said in 2007, "We have had officers using police cars to escort drug dealers, and we have arrested officers selling weapons to undercover agents". He stressed that many officers did their best even while some had chosen to "violate their oath". The previous year, the violent death of trafficking kingpin Jose "Coquito" Lopez Rosario had spawned an investigation into the upper levels of the territory's government. The late kingpin's ties to three local senators extended to the point that one of the officials had brought him along during prison inspections.

=== Crime in the 2010s ===
Officers of the Puerto Rico Police (PRP) using military-type firearms outdoors in 2010

Operation Guard Shack, the culmination of a two-year FBI investigation into law enforcement corruption in the territory, came to a head on October 6, 2010, with a series of pre-dawn raids. These led to over a hundred arrests, with those taken in including members of the PRPD, the Puerto Rico Corrections Department (PRCD), and even U.S. Army soldiers. The corrupt individuals had gone beyond providing security for drug traffickers to actively taking part in the deals. Officials charged a total of 133 individuals in the operation, which generated international media coverage, with publications such as the American CNN and the British Daily Telegraph reporting on it.

The operation began at 3 a.m. as sixty-five tactical groups spread across the territory, with Hostage Rescue Teams (HRT) and Special Weapons and Tactics Teams (SWAT) making the surprise arrests. Over one thousand agents of the FBI, many of them flown into the island secretly, conducted the massive raid. The organization labeled the operation as "likely the largest police corruption case in the FBI's history." "The people of Puerto Rico deserve better," stated then U.S. Attorney General Eric Holder.

Causes of police corruption include the relatively low wages paid to regular officers. Then Police Association President Jose Rodriguez reported in 2007 that Puerto Ricans patrolling the streets made about $26,000 a year (equivalent to $40,000 in 2025). Rodriguez additionally pointed out how local sergeants supervised thirty to thirty-five officers— in contrast to the average of ten in the continental U.S.

Puerto Rico's murder rate dropped somewhat from the 1990s into the 2000s, yet violent crime remained significantly higher not just at a regional but also on an international scale. In the mid-2000s, the territory's troubles ranked it sixth worldwide in murders per capita. In 2006, a total of 736 individuals were murdered in Puerto Rico.

In terms of the 2010s, the cycle of violence between criminals and law enforcement remained a severe challenge as conditions on the island evolved. A 2011 report by the Civil Rights Division of the U.S. Department of Justice into the Puerto Rican police concluded that the department was "broken in a number of critical and fundamental respects". While stating that many "hard working and dedicated" officers "serve the public with distinction under often challenging conditions", the investigators declared that the violations "uncovered are pervasive and plague all levels of" the department. At the conclusion of that year, Puerto Rico's experienced a spike in violent crime, with over a thousand people having been killed.

The Puerto Rican debt crisis of the mid-2010s has challenged the territory's civil society and resulted in hundreds of thousands of residents becoming unemployed. A subsequent wave of migration to the mainland from the island took place as well. A U.S. federal oversight board agreed to supervise the local government's financial administration in 2016, with some $74 billion of debt on the line (equivalent to $97 billion in 2025). A Miami Herald article from 2017 stated that the crisis has left Puerto Rican "institutions in shambles".

During a weekend in December 2018, there were seven killings. The extent to which such violence will cycle as the rebuilding takes place remains uncertain. Police Superintendent Hector Pesquera remarked in 2017 that Puerto Rico's crime problem had been mostly "out of sight, out of mind" to mainland Americans before the hurricane and no longer was.

Nonetheless, individuals such as former Police Superintendent Miguel Pereira have observed that the large profit margins associated with illegal drugs in Puerto Rico, the high demand being driven by multiple social problems, will foster criminal acts no matter what law enforcement tries to do. Pereira provided a specific example in 2013 with how cocaine sold for about $15,000 a kilo on Puerto Rican streets while wholesale producer in areas of Colombia produced the substance for only $400 per kilo or so (equivalent to $21,000 and $600 in 2025). Thus, Pereira publicly lamented, criminals could even lose a full 90% of their supply through anti-drug efforts and still receive significant returns; for instance, a mobster cleaned out of all but 100 of his initial 1,000 kilos could still manage to become a millionaire from those leftovers alone.

=== Crime in the 2020s ===
There were 529 homicides in 2020 and 614 in 2019.

Illegal drugs are routed from Venezuela and the Dominican Republic, continue through Puerto Rico and on to Newark, New Jersey, Philadelphia and Orlando, Florida. Multiple law enforcement agencies have worked to arrest members of drug gangs. La Lorenzana is a violent gang that operates in Aguas Buenas, Cidra, Juncos, Cayey, San Lorenzo and other municipalities. That gang's members kill and dismember victims after assassination and are led by Nelson Torres Delgado, (aka: El Burro), who was arrested in 2019, and was arrested again in October 2024.

== Debates and discussions ==
Commentators that have questioned the effectiveness of government anti-crime policy altogether include Gary Gutierrez, a criminal justice professor at the University of Turabo, and Jorge Rodriguez Beruff, an academic and historian associated with the University of Puerto Rico (UPR).

In 2013, the former secretary of the Puerto Rico Department of Corrections and Rehabilitation Zoé Laboy remarked publicly that "in general terms we have failed" (Spanish: en términos generales hemos fracasado) while arguing that some initiatives had resulted in good outcomes.

In the aftermath of 2017's Hurricane Maria, Miami Herald journalist David Ovalle wrote,

[T]he future for law enforcement on the island is bleak. The department has lost about 4,000 officers in the past five years and, because of the island's economic crisis, cannot count on fresh recruits anytime soon. Hundreds of U.S. Army soldiers, outside law-enforcement officers and private security guards are helping— temporarily— but robberies, murders and drug dealing have resumed at levels that would seem outrageous in mainland states but are tragically normal here.

== Crime against women ==
Domestic violence was criminalized in Puerto Rico under Law 54 of 1989. The law includes a rehabilitation program as an alternative to prison for convicted offenders but according to the Centro de Periodismo Investigativo (Center of Investigative Reporting) this program lacks supervision, which undermines its credibility.

From 2009 to 2021 at least 196 women on the island were killed in acts of gender-based violence according to the Oficina de la Procuradora de la Mujer (Office of the Woman's Rights Advocate) of the government of Puerto Rico. On January 26, 2021, governor Pedro Pierluisi declared a state of emergency after several women were murdered. The epidemic of violence against women in Puerto Rico reached a high when in two unrelated cases women were murdered at the end of April, 2021. According to the FBI Félix Verdejo murdered Keishla Rodríguez Ortiz, his pregnant lover, on April 30, 2021. The 27-year-old was punched, injected with drugs, tied to heavy stones, thrown over a bridge into a river and then shot at. The other murder victim, Andrea C. Ruiz Costas, had requested a restraining order against her violent partner but had been denied. These murders attracted large media and public attention which increased demands from women seeking assistance in cases of gender based violence. On May 5 the Financial Oversight and Management Board for Puerto Rico which is managing Puerto Rico's debt crisis approved $7 million in funding after initially rejecting this amount. The money was approved so that the Puerto Rico police can address the epidemic of gender violence. On August 27, 2021, governor Pedro Pierluisi signed into law a measure that turned femicides and transfemicides into separate categories of crimes. The new law designated these crimes as first degree murders and as a result raised the punishment for committing them to a maximum of 99 years.

== In popular culture ==
- Crime in Puerto Rico is featured in a film and accompanying soundtrack by Daddy Yankee called Talento de Barrio.
- "Calle Luna, Calle Sol", a salsa song by Willie Colón and Héctor Lavoe, is about crime in Puerto Rico. (Calle Luna and Calle Sol are streets in San Juan, Puerto Rico and also in Ponce, Puerto Rico.)

== See also ==
- Crime in the United States
- Government of Puerto Rico
  - Puerto Rico Department of Justice
  - Puerto Rico Police Department
- Martinez Familia Sangeros
- Illegal drugs in Puerto Rico
- Puerto Rican people
- Social culture of Puerto Rico
- Tony Tursi (criminal)
- Edsel Torres Gomez
- Papo Cachete
- Tomas de Jesus Mangual - well known Puerto Rican crime reporter
- Jaime Dávila Reyes
