= Illegal drug trade in Puerto Rico =

Puerto Rico
- Crime rates* (2008)

Violent crimes
- Homicide: 26.2(2011)
- Rape: 2.4
- Robbery: 138.3
- Aggravated assault: 78.8
- Total violent crime: 239.9

Property crimes
- Burglary: 484
- Larceny-theft: 837.4
- Motor vehicle theft: 177.1
- Total property crime: 1,498.5
- Note: Reported crimes per 100,000 population Source: FBI 2008 UCR data

The Illegal drug trade in Puerto Rico is a problem from a criminal, social, and medical perspective. Located in the Caribbean, Puerto Rico has become a major transshipment point for drugs into the United States. Violent and property crimes have increased due in part to dealers trying to keep their drug business afloat, using guns and violence to protect themselves, their turfs, and drug habits.

Crimes related to drugs are not the only crimes plaguing the island. Along with gang violence the island has also been victim to Police and political corruption.

== Chronology ==
=== 1970–2008 ===
The Government of Puerto Rico has struggled to combat illegal drug use and the resulting crime since the mid-1970s. Their efforts have been referred to as a "war on drugs". Though drug use was uncommon in Puerto Rico in the 1950s, it markedly increased in the late 1960s. In the 1970s the increase in drug use, particularly among those under the age of 25, became a major concern in Puerto Rico. During this era, a person named Rafy Dones surfaced as one of the first, alleged major drug traffickers operating in Puerto Rico; he was sentenced to a jail term on 30 September 1977. A number of drug cartels have used Puerto Rico as a transfer point for trafficking cocaine to the mainland United States.

Many Puerto Ricans have attributed the increase in crime to the drug trade. This led to a major focus on crime and drugs in Puerto Rican politics. In response, federal and local law enforcement agencies have attempted to integrate their efforts to fight drug crime.

Strategies used by the government of Puerto Rico include long sentences for criminals, increased funding for law enforcement equipment, and the construction of new prisons. At times, however, the DEA and the Puerto Rican police have struggled to work together and some commentators have questioned the effectiveness of government drug policy.

In the early 1990s, law enforcement began targeting white collar drug users.

=== 2009–present ===
The start of the "drug wars" in Puerto Rico was in 2009 in a conflict between Police and drug dealers which police wounded and killed two men in the rural town of Naranjito. In the house they found AK-47, M9 pistols and the drugs. Also they found that they were working with corrupt politicians to approve marijuana legalization and the export of exotic animals. In 2010 police captured 16 drug dealer "clans" that had the same information and they worked together to defeat opposing dealers. They also started to "clean house" in 2010, when they killed about 44 men attached to some drug dealers or those that were compromising the dealer. In 2011 the death toll was 1,266 at one point, due to many big drug arrests different gangs went into war with each other for the control of drugs in the island. In 2011 it was discovered that many of the killings were to cover up some corrupt politicians. In 2012, around 1,000 murders were reported. Also in Bayamon, a major city of Puerto Rico, many drug cartels started to defend their dealers by getting snipers and attackers on rooftops. "Sikarios" would be put on the rooftops to defend their drug turf in different housing projects due to wars against rival gangs that would try to take over the drug turf. Police captured a sniper in late 2011, the sniper had a Dragunov Caliber Sniper Rifle and was arrested with 5 other drug dealers. In early 2012, two assassinations occurred in Humacao involving the Carteli.

The FBI, with its field office in San Juan, along with the Department of Homeland Security, and the DEA have multiple task forces working on the illegal drug trade in Puerto Rico.

== Drug trafficking ==
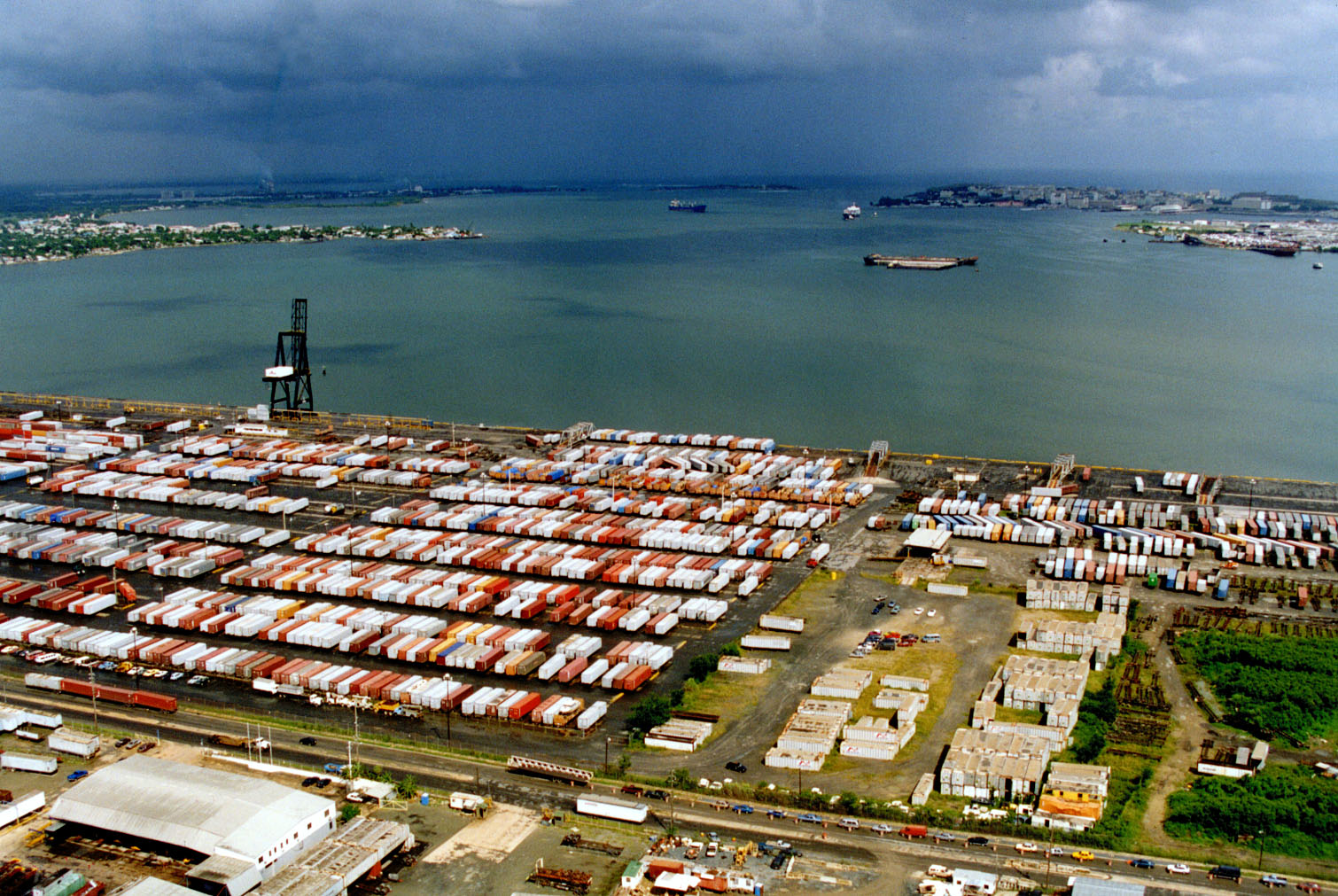
The Port of San Juan is one of the busiest ports in the Caribbean and Latin America.

As early as 1978, Puerto Rico had already become a transshipment point for illegal drugs that are smuggled from source countries like Colombia, Venezuela, and Peru into the U.S. mainland. Most of it is transported to and through the island from drug trafficking organizations in the Dominican Republic and Colombia, and criminal organizations in Puerto Rico.

=== Cocaine ===
U.S. Customs and Border Protection (CBP) seized 1,176.74 pounds of cocaine in 2001 from commercial maritime vessels and 14, 932.53 pounds of cocaine from private maritime vessels in Puerto Rico. Go-fast boats are the most favorable, as they are fast and stealthy, and have been used to intercept drug shipments that have been dropped off into the open water from other larger ships or airdropped from aircraft.

In June 2012, 36 people were arrested in Puerto Rico and the U.S. mainland for smuggling 61,000 pounds of cocaine into the U.S through Puerto Rico's Luis Muñoz Marín International Airport aboard flights operated by American Airlines. The smuggling had been taking place since 1999.

In 1996, a group of researchers from Puerto Rico's Mental Health and Anti Addiction Services Administration, published the results of a study involving 849 out-of-treatment drug users in the San Juan area. Their study found that 36.5% of the drug users in the study were crack cocaine users only, 42.4% were drug injectors only and 21.1% were both drug injectors and crack users.

In April 2021, a shipment of cocaine with an estimated value of $50 million was intercepted in Yabucoa.

=== Heroin ===
In 2001, U.S. Customs and Border Protection in Puerto Rico seized 56 kilograms of heroin from commercial aircraft at airports and 28 kilograms of heroin from commercial maritime vessels in Puerto Rico. That same year, government officials arrested seven individuals in Puerto Rico, for swallowing between 36 and 98 condoms full of heroin, when they arrived from Aruba on a cruise ship. In June 2002, drug detecting dogs detected and CBP seized 24 kilograms of heroin in a cargo storage area on a pier in San Juan. That same year federal law enforcement officials in San Juan seized 1.4 kilograms of heroin from a passenger arriving from Aruba on a cruise ship.

Addicts "shooting up" with dirty needles has created a public health emergency in Puerto Rico with an HIV positive rate that is 4 times higher than the U.S. national average. Hogares CREA is one of the few organizations offering addicts rehabilitation services.

=== Marijuana ===
In 2001, CBP confiscated 205 kilos of marijuana at airports throughout Puerto Rico. In 2002, a resident of San Juan was arrested at the airport, when government officials found 12.7 kilograms of marijuana hidden in his luggage.

== Police corruption ==
In 2008, four police officers in Puerto Rico were arrested by the Federal Bureau of Investigation (FBI), including a Lieutenant with 33 years on the force, for extortion and distribution of cocaine and heroin. In 2007, 9 police officers and their lieutenant were arrested for planting drug evidence, including cocaine, heroin, and crack, on people living in the city's low-income housing projects, prompting Puerto Rico's attorney general's office to review previous cases, making sure no innocent people were put in prison. Between 2003 and 2007, 100 officers had been under investigation and 75 others convicted under federal court for police corruption.

In 2001, one of the biggest police corruption busts in U.S. history took place in Puerto Rico, when 28 state police officers in Puerto Rico were arrested for drug-running charges. The yearlong undercover operation was initiated by the FBI, after authorities got a tip about the police possibly being involved in drug dealing, and protecting cocaine dealers and shipments and movement throughout the island. Between 1993 and 2000, 1,000 police officers in Puerto Rico lost their jobs from the department due to criminal charges. Police corruption in Puerto Rico stems from the fact that police officers make small wages and are so close to the cocaine trafficking.

Operation Guard Shack was a two-year FBI investigation into law enforcement corruption in Puerto Rico. The operation came to a conclusion on 6 October 2010 with a series of pre-dawn raids that led to over 130 arrests of members of the Puerto Rico Police Department, various municipal departments, and the Puerto Rico Corrections Department. The operation began at 3 a.m., when 65 tactical teams, including FBI SWAT and the Hostage Rescue Team (HRT), fanned out across the island in a series of sneak attack arrests. On hand were a range of Bureau personnel—crisis negotiators, evidence response team members, canines and their handlers, and 80 medical personnel from first responders and nurses to a trauma surgeon and a veterinarian. The central thread of the corruption was law enforcement officers providing protection and other services to drug traffickers. Over 1,000 agents of the FBI conducted the raids. Many of them were flown in secretly. The agency characterized the action as, "likely the largest police corruption case in the FBI's history."

== Gangs ==
It is cheap and easy to buy and deal to the public in housing projects in Puerto Rico, leading to the second highest homicide rates in the United States or its territories. New gangs like La ONU and Rompe ONU are also prominent in Puerto Rico. They are in the illegal drug trade.

== Crime reduction ==
The Puerto Rican government has implemented a series of law enforcement operations in relation to the federal "war on drugs" in order to minimize drug-related crimes and trafficking on the island. In 1985, the government started Operation Greenback, an investigation by the FBI, Internal Revenue Service (IRS), the Department of Justice (DOJ), and the Drug Enforcement Administration (DEA), into the inconsistencies between the drastic increase of cash flow into the Puerto Rican economy and the double digit unemployment rate and bad economy in the 70s and early 1980s. The operation uncovered money laundering schemes from within financial institutions and from the sale of illegal lottery tickets. Federal agents raided 10 banks and arrested 17 people on money laundering charges.

In 1990, Operation Lucky Strike was put in motion by the FBI and local law enforcement officials, when residents of Vega Baja unearthed $20 million on a nearby farm. They tried to stop the circulation of the illegal money and mobilized to arrest the individuals connected to the money.

== See also ==
- Puerto Rican people
- Organizacion de Narcotraficantes Unidos-"La ONU"
- Edsel Torres Gomez
  - Cayey Massacre
- Wes Solano
- Alexis Candelario Santana
  - 2009 Sabana Seca massacre
- Alex Trujillo
- Papo Cachete

Regional:

- Mexican drug war, an armed conflict between the Mexican government and drug trafficking cartels
- Colombian War on Drugs, an ongoing armed conflict involving the Colombian government, Colombian Drug gangs, narco-paramilitary groups and guerrillas (the guerrillas are known to use drug trafficking to finance their operations).
