= Rafael Dones =

Puerto Rican drug dealer

Rafael "Rafy" Dones Arroyo (1944-1984) was a Puerto Rican alleged drug dealer and independence advocate. He was known for allegedly being one of the first "bichotes"- or drug lords-in Puerto Rico. Dones was friends with Filiberto Ojeda Rios, and was alleged to have connections to Los Macheteros, a clandestine militant and insurgent organization that advocates for Puerto Rico's independence from the United States.

== Accusations ==
Dones was charged with drug dealing in 1974. Prosecution witness Pablo Padilla was murdered on December 14 of that year, three days before Dones' trial.

In 1977, Dones was accused of being the intellectual author of Padilla's murder. The Padilla murder case received substantial attention in Puerto Rican press, to the point that Dones' lawyers asked for a mistrial based on their belief that the jurors were allowed to read articles about it in newspapers such as El Vocero. The motion was denied.

== Death ==
Dones was gunned down in 1984 as he was leaving a hospital rehab center, where he had gone for treatment for methadone addiction.

== See also ==
- List of Puerto Ricans
- Alex Trujillo
- Edsel Torres Gomez
- Papo Cachete
- Jaime Davila Reyes
- Illegal drug trade in Puerto Rico
