= Jorge Solano Moreta =

Puerto Rican drug trafficker

Jorge Solano Moreta (born c. 1970), also commonly known as Wes Solano, is an admitted drug seller from Puerto Rico. He gained infamy during the early 1990s, when newspapers such as El Nuevo Dia and El Vocero documented his alleged gang activities.

== Biography ==
Jorge Solano Moreta is a native of the Dominican Republic but he grew up in Bayamon. He came into the Puerto Rican public eye during the late 1980s and early 1990s, as many violent events took place in the Bayamón area. The newspapers commonly pointed Solano Moreta and his gang as the perpetrators of many criminal acts, and linked Solano Moreta with the Puerto Rican mafia. It was during that era that he became widely known as Wes by the general Puerto Rican public.

According to United States law records, Solano Moreta controlled drug trafficking at the Virgilio Dávila residential area since 1992. This caused a drug war between his gang and other gangs in Puerto Rico's metropolitan area. From 1992 to 1995, Solano Moreta was featured in many articles in the crime section of Puerto Rico's newspapers.

=== Arrest and Trial ===
Solano Moreta was declared a fugitive in 1995 and on June 7 of the same year was surprised and arrested by law enforcement, while living in a friend's apartment.

Solano Moreta pled guilty to engaging in a continuing criminal enterprise on May 29, 1996. What ensued was a legal battle, however, because Solano Moreta alleged, among other things, that an agreement outside the bounds of his plea bargain had made him convinced to plead guilty of the charge, and also, that his legal counsel did not properly challenge some tapes of him allegedly talking to other people, which were used as evidence. Another of Solano Moreta's alleged associates, Luis Alicea Cardona, alias Burbuja, was also convicted and fought his conviction, alleging the only evidence used against Burbuja were some beeper messages. Burbuja's conviction was upheld by the court.

Solano Moreta was sentenced to 45 years in prison in December 1997. On July 1, 2005, he made the news pages in Puerto Rico again, when he asked judge Salvador Casellas for his sentence of 45 years to be either suspended or modified so he could leave jail at an earlier time.

== See also ==
- List of Puerto Ricans
- Edsel Torres Gomez
- Alex Trujillo
