= Martinez Familia Sangeros =

Puerto Rican mafia and a cartel

The Puerto Rican Mob/The Puerto Rican mafia
- Founded: 1980s
- Founded by: Quitoni Martinez
- Founding location: Aguada, Puerto Rico
- Years active: 1980–present
- Territory: United States (New York, Massachusetts, Florida, Connecticut, Pennsylvania, Illinois, New Jersey), Mexico, Spain (Specifically the canary islands), Panama, Puerto Rico
- Ethnicity: Puerto Ricans, Afro–Puerto Ricans, Cubans, Afro-Cubans
- Membership (est.): 6 crime families with 1200 to 1500 strong soldiers ( took an oath and committed murder) and affiliates
- Criminal activities: Racketeering, Corporate crime, Police corruption, Loan sharking, Counterfeiting, Arms trafficking, Drug Trafficking, Extortion, Illegal Gambling, Blackmailing, Money Laundering, Contract Killing, Bribery, Robbery, Tax Evasion, Mass Murder, Assault
- Allies: Ñetas; American Mafia; Cali Cartel (defunct); Guadalajara Cartel (defunct); Latin Kings; Russian mafia Los Pepes (defunct); La ONU
- Rivals: La Rompe ONU; The Corporation; Paulino Castillo Organization (conflict with some families); Mau Maus (defunct); Medellín Cartel (defunct); Gulf Cartel; Grupo 27

The Puerto Rican Mob/The Puerto Rican mafia, consists of 6 crime families , in the northwestern coast of Puerto Rico around the cities of San Juan, Aguadilla, Añasco and Isabela. The family was founded by Quitoni Martinez, José "Coquito" López Rosario whom later split from the Family to form his own which became a family within the Puerto Rican mafia, Henry Vega, Iván Vega, and Luis Albertos Rodríguez. They had strong connections with The Cali Cartel and small connections with Los Pepes, Paulino Castillo Organization, Gulf Cartel and the Puerto Rican street gang Ñetas.

== Foundation ==
The Martínez Familia Aka Estrella Family has been called the Puerto Rican mafia and a cartel. Quitoni and Julio García, who were very good friends, started the Puerto Rican mafia to reportedly bring their family out of poverty. They started making money selling marijuana and cocaine, making $250,000 every week from their sells. They used the money earned from their drug sales to start their mafia.

In the early 1980s, the mafia started recruiting members offering $1,000 for joining. By 1984 they had more than 30 members in their family. By 1986 they started building their empire by buying $20 million worth of coke from the Colombian cartel known as . This helped them forge connections with other cartels and mafia around the Caribbean and even Europe. The Puerto Rican mafia started buying boats near the Port of San Juan. They began shipping coke overseas and into the United States to Colorado They even started transporting weapons to Spain and Texas . They had over 100 members in their family and grew larger through the years.

The Family started loan sharking and extorting. They invested in small business and threatened business, as well as blackmailed other gangs into paying them lump sums of money. This counted for only 23% of their net worth.

== Organization ==
The Family became very organized, establishing different ranks within the Family. These ranks determined how much money a member was earning and what was expected out of them. The ranks consisted of 6 parts:

El Gran: Pablo Estrella Quito held this rank as the Don of the mafia. He resolved all issues between capos and castas within the family, and he ultimately developed and approved large business deals. In some cases, he decided whether someone was to be killed or not. The El Gran received a cut of every operation taken on by each member of his family. Quitoni was the mafia's most prized possession and his safety was always a priority. The only people that could meet with him were El Copas or El Castas as well as the Contador. Quitoni controlled the whole Family and anything he ordered said was to be carried out or the dissenter was killed. Typically, the El Gran put layers of insulation between himself and any acts. Whenever he gave orders, he gave them in private they never spoke overy the phone they send messages to Copas who would in turn pass them down the line.

El Copa: The most successful Copa of the Puerto Rican mafia was Quitoni's son Peter Estrella Sr who earned a grand total of $20 million for the family in one business deal. He went from a soldier to a Copa quickly because of how much he made for the family after he became a made man. El Copas were second in command in the Puerto Rican mafia; they organized business deal with other countries and gangs and presented them to El Gran. They examined everything the El Gran said to make sure that there were no holes in any of his plans. They made sure that whoever was sentenced to death was dead, and they had command over the castas and soldiers. They were in training to be El Gran one day. Peter Estrella alone had over 10 males training to be small bosses who commanded their portion of the mafia in different parts of the island and even in the United States. If there were any problems they were taken to them before they were taken to El Gran. They were able to send out hits and could really do almost anything except kill a fellow boss. Pete the greatest Copa of the mafia had 400 cartel soldados killed and would kill anyone he felt that he could not trust; this ensured that the mafia would not be infiltrated.

Él Contador: This was Maloo Estrella known as counters, there was one Contador for each Copa; they were responsible for counting the family's money. They made receipts after drug deals and made sure that the family was not being cheated and that no one within the family was stealing money from El Gran. They consulted The Copas or Quitoni whenever something didn't seem right. They were sometimes called by members of the families "chotas", a Spanish word meaning whistle blower (also known in America as a snitch).

El Casta: Castas were simply made men, or leaders of the Soldados. There were only allowed to be 2-4 castas and they had to be of full Puerto Rican descent. These men were able to work their way up to be a Copa. These men were appointed by El Copas and were usually made body guards and money collectors. They kept 40% of the money they made from their operations. 60% was given to the El Gran and deposited into a bank account which only the El Gran and Copa had access to.

Soldados: Soldados were the ones responsible for killing, robbing, collecting, driving, and making small sales on the streets. They operated the boats and made shipments to other countries and parts of the island. They had to find ways to make money for the Family and could become a made man in the Puerto Rican mafia. Soldiers could be of any nationality, but ultimately only full blooded Puerto Ricans could be made men. Being a made man did not always mean they were becoming a casta. It could simply mean they were officially a Sangero, a member of the family with certain rights and a chance to make more and get better jobs. Estrella family had 30 males no females

The lowest rank were Hombrecitos: These were the men who took the fall for most of the crimes and would also help hide coke and other illegal drugs and stolen merchandise. They were referred to as Zanganos and didn't make much money. These men usually consisted of whites and blacks whom the mafia felt were not good enough to become made men or soldiers. They were often paid as little as $800 for their services. The mafia promised them protection and money. These were sometimes business owners that the mafia would blackmail.

The members were also paid through a process called "Sueldo".

In the early 1990s, the Family started grossing a reported $754 million from investments and drug sales. These numbers got picked up by the police in Puerto Rico and soon the Mafia was being watched by the FBI.

Estrella called a meeting in 1994 which called all Copas and Castas. They met at one of his houses located in Spain. He stated that they were being watched by police and FBI and that no more recruiting was to be done by the family and that all drug dealing was to be stopped except for small street deals. This would help keep them under the radar for a little while. In 1996, Manny Garcia had been reportedly murdered by the Mafia and hidden. His body was never found by police and no evidence pointed to the mafia except rumors that stated that Manny was seen reportedly talking a cop. One of the Soldados passed the message to the Copa known as Garland Rodriguez who told Quitoni. Quitoni had placed a contract hit on Manny worth $50,000. Manny's tongue was cut out of his mouth and was replaced by a rose. This was a sign that El Gran called the hit. Manny helped make money for the mafia and was very close to Quitoni, making Quitoni the godfather of his children.

Accusations were made about (El Copa) Estrella: he supposedly hired 5 spies and 3 men to infiltrate the police district and 2 men to infiltrate the FBI. The mafia had reportedly had their files destroyed from police records and were soon being called "Los Silencios" because of them being able to get away with most of their crimes. This helped keep them under the radar and out of police view. Quitoni fled the island and moved to Spain where he would stay until the birth of his first grandson Rolando Martinez Williams in March 1997. In June 2012, 36 people were arrested in Puerto Rico and the U.S. mainland for smuggling 61,000 pounds of cocaine into the U.S through Puerto Rico's Luis Muñoz Marín International Airport aboard flights operated by American Airlines. The smuggling had been taking place since 1999. This was linked to the Martinez Familia.

== Growth and death of El Gran ==
The Martinez Familia, who started off selling marijuana and cocaine, started shipping drugs around Latin America, North America and Europe as early as 1985, with the help of Cali Cartel. They would use the Port of San Juan and buy ships to transport their merchandise to Caribbean islands and other countries. They supplied drug dealers such as Frank Lucas, Ñetas, Latin Kings, Ismael Zambada Garcia, and Zoe Pound as well as many others. They started becoming a supplier when Cali Cartel cut their ties with them in the 1990s. The mafia then hired a chemist from Spain to start making coke for them. They reportedly started making $750 million - $1.billion from international drug deals, extortion and loan sharking. They soon began having issues with the Mexican cartel known as Gulf Cartel who asked for $35 million for their help in making deals in Mexico. The Gulf Cartel soon started blackmailing the Puerto Rican mafia, which resulted in the kidnapping and killing of several members of the Gulf Cartel.

According to reports and testimonies from supposed ex-members of the Sangeros, the family owned several homes and apartments within Puerto Rico, the United States and Spain. They had grossed a total of $500 million from a deal made with the Gulf Cartel.

The Puerto Rican mafia made a reported total of $10 million from loan sharking, extortion and renting properties. The mafia would extort small businesses, street gangs and judges. They promised these people protection and would have them pay the mafia a sueldo as high as $10,000-$4.9 million. They would blackmail businesses and ask owners to pay them for protection every week. They gave out loans to people around the island and New York, to lawyers, business owners and ordinary people. Carlos Martine gave a loan of $48,627 to an illegal Colombian immigrant by the name of Javier Alvarez, living in Florida. Alvarez refused to pay back the loan with interest and returned only $13,000 back to the mafia. Carlos (El Copa) had him kidnapped, brought to Puerto Rico and buried alive somewhere on the island. Carlos was responsible for earning more than $385 million for the Family through international deals and investments. He was responsible for several kidnappings and the murder of the Quiñones family in 2007, in which he was sentenced to 5 years in prison due to his close ties with the judge. Upon his release in 2011, he was stabbed in the Rio Piedras Penitentiary (also known in Puerto Rico as "Oso Blanco"). Carlos was rushed to the Hospital San Francisco where he died four hours later. Quitoni had a Venganza placed for $1 million for whoever killed the man responsible; the inmate was murdered a week after Carlos's death.

In 2003, the mafia was grossing $956 million in revenue from the United States and Japan alone and they invested in U.S stocks. They made $500 million through the pharmaceutical business that they also invested in; the family even donated $5 million to charities in Africa and Latin American countries to help fight AIDS and provide education.

== Quitoni ==
Quitoni "El Gran", leader of one of the crime families, he made over $56 million for the mafia from extortion, money laundering, loan sharking, and drug trafficking. Coming from a poor background, he built a drug empire that brought in millions. He killed more than 15000 people to reach his goal, including some of the members of his mafia. QuitonI had several children who were affiliated with the mafia, except his son Carlos who became the most successful Copa. Carlos raked in millions for the family until his death in 2011. Quitoni's 3rd eldest grandson Rolando is believed to have been made El Copa and Quitoni's brother is believed to be El Gran now. Since Rolando was made El Copa before his grandfather's death in 2013, this would mean he has inherited over $130 million worth of money, property and deals. This rumor has been discovered as true The rumored Copa was seen at his grandfather's funeral which was held privately and was also seen leaving the funeral with two men who are believed to be Soldados. After the funeral he was seen boarding a private plane heading to the United States. Over 100 people attended the funeral of Quitoni who died of lung cancer they say

There were several cases linked to the family in the 1990s; the most creditable was the case where several men were arrested in the Port of San Juan for supposed drug trafficking. Quitoni had several grandchildren. Quitoni lost his grandson Luis in a 2011 car accident, a year before his own deat After the death of Quitoni's family would inherit a total of $24.6 million which would be split evenly between blood relatives. This is hard to believe because some sources say that the family was going broke around the time of Quitoni's death because of excessive spending and health issues within the family, some sources say the family only has $8 million to split between the blood relatives. The crime family is still around and living although not as strong as they were in the early days they are still running the streets thanks to El Gran Mateo who has taken Quitoni's place as Don of the family. Quitoni's grandchildren's have a net worth of $4 Million dollars while Quitoni had a networth of about $320 million before his decline in 2000. The mafia leader was said to have been going broke and had 10 million dollars left in his accounts, this was eventually said to be split between the mafia as well as the children and grandchildren of the mafia leader. Rolando Martinez as well Rosalita Martinez had been spotted in 2012 attending school in Puerto Rico. In April 2014 the Rosalita, Quitoni's eldest Granddaughter was murder along with an uncle in their home located in Arecibo Puerto Rico. No one was charged. In 2015 Don Gonzalez head of the Vega family was taken to trial and is in the process of being sentenced. Puerto Rican police have been cracking down on its Gangs and on criminals because of its reputation of being hazardous in many places in Puerto Rico.

== See also ==
- Illegal immigration to the United States and crime
- Tony Tursi
