= Masacre de Cayey =

Killings on March 13, 1994 in Puerto Rico

The Masacre de Cayey or Cayey Massacre, was the murder of four people on March 13, 1994, at various locations in Puerto Rico. Because three of the four victims were killed in Cayey the local press called it the Masacre de Cayey (Cayey Massacre).

== Murders ==
Angel Castro Alifonso was suspected of stealing between $4.2 and $7 million dollars from a gang allegedly led by Edsel Torres Gomez. On March 13, 1994, he and three other people were intercepted by minions and Castro Alifonso was murdered on the spot by multiple gun shots. The three others, identified by authorities as Edison Marrero Vazquez, Jose Manuel Alamo Diaz and Carlos Enrique Ortiz Feliciano, were then driven to Caguas, where they were tortured and interrogated. They were allegedly made to drink gasoline, and then driven to Cayey, where they were shot and set on fire. The three burnt bodies were found inside a car.

The three victims who were murdered in Cayey were innocent bystanders; Castro-Alifonso had met with them to discuss buying real estate property. Puerto Rican newspaper El Vocero ran a series of articles about the massacre during 1998.

Luís Rivera Newton was sentenced to life in prison for the killings. Another man, identified as Hector Ayala Adorno, who had been living in the United States since 1994 under the name of "Miguel Velez", was arrested in 1998 as a suspect of having actively participated in the massacre.

== See also ==
- Crime in Puerto Rico
- 2023 Carolina, Puerto Rico, massacre
