= Residencial Luis Lloréns Torres =

Apartments complex in Puerto Rico

Coordinates: 18°26′55″N 66°2′34″W

Residencial Luis Lloréns Torres, also commonly known as Lloréns Torres, is a public housing complex in the district of Shanghai in the northeast of Santurce barrio in San Juan, the capital municipality of Puerto Rico. It is located a few minutes driving distance from both the tourist and hotels areas of the Condado and Isla Verde neighborhoods, and from Luis Munoz Marin International Airport. It is also minutes away from the neighboring city of Carolina. Named after Puerto Rican poet Luis Lloréns Torres, the complex is the largest housing and apartments complex in Puerto Rico, with some 2,600 residents accounted during the 2000 census. Other sources, such as Univision, say there are as many as 30,000 residents in the residencial. These residents occupy 2,000 apartments.

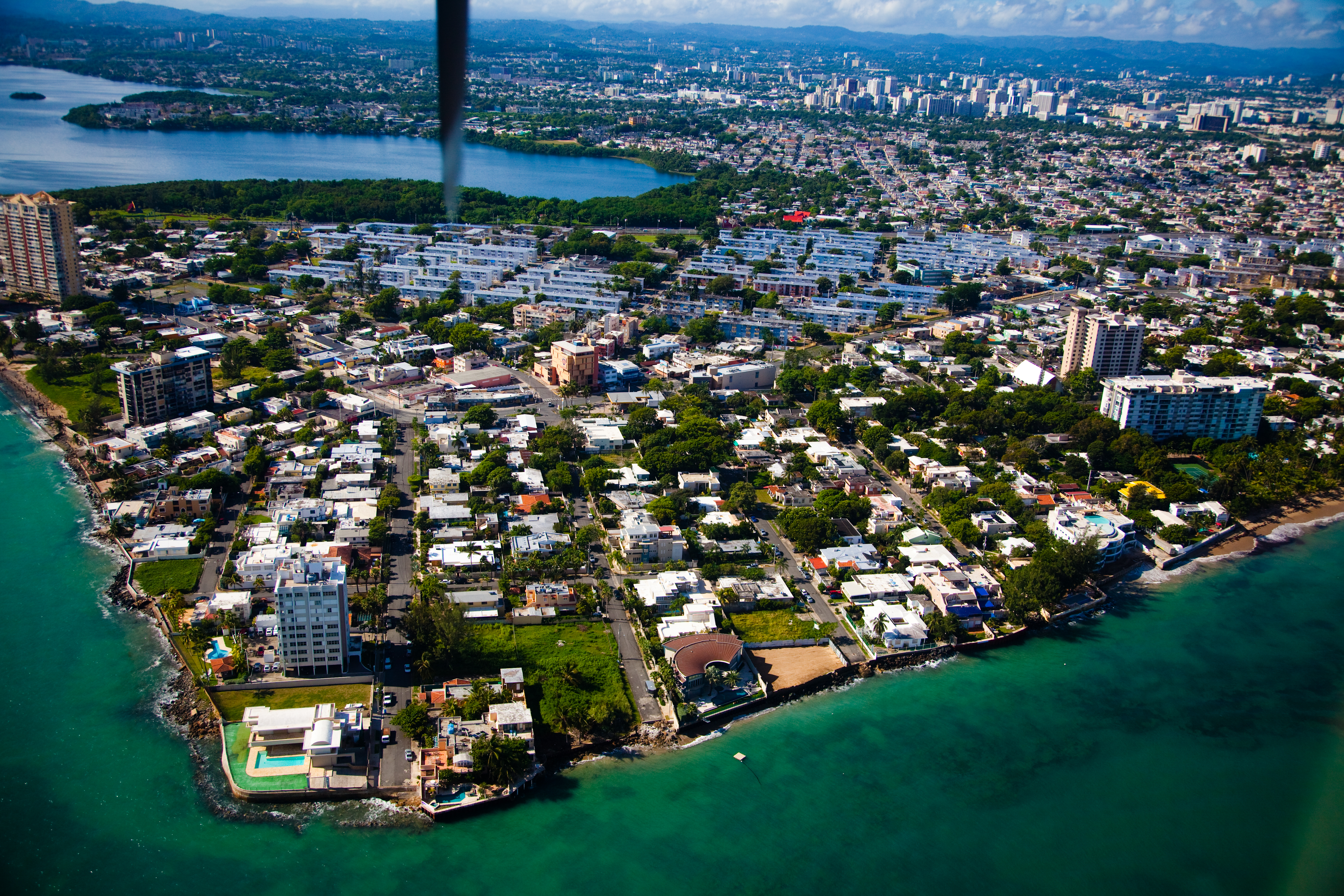
Aerial view of eastern Santurce barrio in San Juan with Residencial Luis Lloréns Torres visible (gray rectangular structures in center), 2010

The complex is also known for its long standing drug trafficking situation. For decades, the residencial, along with others such as Residencial Nemesio Canales and Torres de Sabana, for example, has been a focus of the illegal drug trade in Puerto Rico, and there have been periodic rivalries between cartels operating at Luis Lloréns Torres and those other residenciales, as well as with cartels from other areas of the island.

== History ==
Construction of the residencial began early in the 1950s. By 1953, construction was completed and the residencial opened its doors to new residents. The residencial was inaugurated on July 27 of 1953.

By the late 1980s, the residencial had begun suffering from drug gang activity. The situation has been a long-standing one, and by 2022, police interventions and arrests continued.

There have been attempts at improving the quality of life at the Residencial. During 2011, Puerto Rico Islanders association football players Marco Velez, Alexis Rivera and Noah Delgado visited to teach children of the residencial association football skills. And, in 2013, members of rival drug gangs that operate in the residencial held a meeting to agree to a peace accord.

== Notable residents ==
- Bizcocho – comedian, lived there 16 years
- Yovngchimi - Rapper

== See also ==
- Residencial Las Casas – a nearby residencial and former commercial airport
- Public housing in Puerto Rico
