= Maritza Medina =

Puerto Rican actress

Maritza Medina Rivera
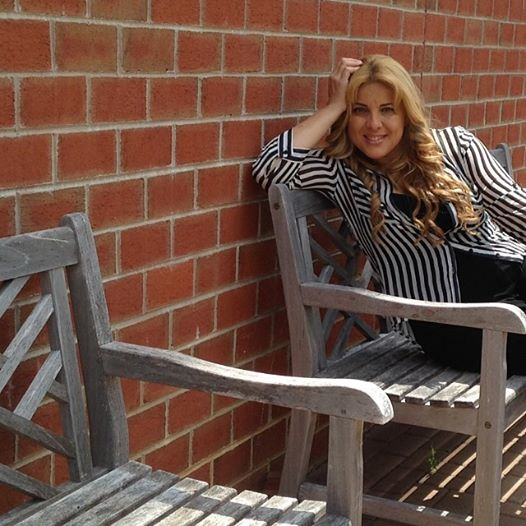
- Maritza on Washington 2014
- Born: June 12, 1967 (age 59); Illinois, US

Maritza Medina (born in Illinois, June 12, 1967) is a Puerto Rican actress, model, doula and radio host. She was raised in Jayuya, Puerto Rico.

Maritza's career began in 1989, acting some characters on Telemundo Fantasy, 'La Pension de Doña Tere ", "A Toda Maquina". "Musicomedia", "Show de las 12" among others. After the birth of her twins, she started on the TV program "Anda Pal 'Cara!" on Univision" and "Desde mi Pueblo on WIPR (Channel 6 on Puerto Rico)

After pausing in her career, she devoted herself to raising their three daughters.

Medina used for quiet time as a main stage the Hospital Hima San Pablo with EGO'S group. She still educating women on TV about breastfeeding, appearing weekly on the TV program 'Dia a Dia' (Day by Day) on Telemundo, also a weekly section on the Puerto Ricans' newspaper El Vocero. Maritza is currently the host of a radio program "In God's Time" (Al Tiempo de Dios) on 90.5 fm (Cadena Radio Vida) and as a collaborator on Dia Dia by Telemundo. Starting in 2014 was part of the play "Learned Behavior" (Conducta aprendida) presented in all theaters in Puerto Rico. 2016 she also began a weekly program "Buena Tarde" in Univision.
