= Martin Gonzalez =

Martin Gonzalez or Martín González may refer to:

- Martín González (musician), Argentinian musician
- Martín González (footballer) (born 1994), Uruguayan footballer
- Martín González, Carolina, Puerto Rico, a barrio
