= Mangual =

Mangual is a surname. Notable people with the surname include:

- Ángel Mangual (1947–2021), Puerto Rican baseball player
- Iván Mangual
- Pepe Mangual (born 1952), Puerto Rican baseball player
- Tomás de Jesús Mangual (1944–2011), Puerto Rican journalist

A mangual is a type of Flail (weapon).
