= Organizacion de Narcotraficantes Unidos =

Puerto Rican criminal organization

La ONU
- Years active: 1999 - present
- Territory: Puerto Rico
- Ethnicity: Puerto Ricans
- Membership: 3 families , several hundred members
- Activities: drug trafficking, arms trafficking, murders, contract killings
- Rivals: La Rompe ONU

The Organizacion de Narcotraficantes Unidos (ONU, or La ONU) (in English: United Drug Traffickers), is a Puerto Rican criminal organization based in Bayamón, Puerto Rico. It is an organization dedicated to drug dealing and unifying various well-known dealers under one umbrella group. Established in 1995, by 2009, when 37 members of the organization were arrested, it had become the most powerful drug trafficking organizations in Puerto Rico. $100 million dollars were forfeited during the siege by the Bayamón Task Force and other authorities. It began with the purposes of unifying criminal elements but often ended in turf wars and revenge killings.

== History ==
Copying the way the United Nations is named which is Organizacion de Naciones Unidas in Spanish, and commonly abbreviated to "ONU", the group calls itself Organizacion de Narcotraficantes Unidos (ONU) and (in English: United Narcotraffickers Organization).

The criminal organization was originally formed by José "Coquito" López Rosario, also known as "Coco Blin Blin" (a reference to his Blin Blin music). From there Angel Ayala Vazquez (known as "Angelo Millones", "El Negro" and "El Buster") and "Pito Paz" had joined. Their idea was for all drug traffickers to stop their turf wars and work together, with a set of rules and regulations, in order to form a powerful empire that could not be overthrown by the Puerto Rico Police.

La ONU was divided into local gangs such as Bin Laden Records, los Extranjeros, los Anormales, among others. According to police records, at some time Ayala Vazquez decided to let a man named Jose Colon run the drug trade at the Virgilio Davila public housing, near downtown Bayamón , and Colon's brother, Christopher Colon the drug trade at the Rafael Torrech public housing.

By 2004, La ONU had many members controlling the drug trafficking trade in all of Puerto Rico. ONU helped transport shipments from Colombia, Puerto Rico, Venezuela and other Latin American countries to the United States.

In 2009, Ayala Vazquez was arrested by the FBI and 65 members of his organization were indicted. Jose Colon was arrested in 2010. By then the gang was involved in distributing heroin, cocaine, marijuana, crack, Xanax and Percocet.

Even after original members of the organization were murdered or arrested, arrests and murders of kin continued. On July 29, 2013, four years after "Chino Valencia" was murdered, his son was murdered while at a gas station one morning in Bayamón. In 2018, eight years after Ayala Vazquez ("Angelo Millones") was arrested, his twin sons were arrested on drug and weapons charges.

== Decline ==
On July 28, 2006, La ONU member López Rosario died six days after being shot and on August 3, 2006, the FBI became involved in Lopez Rosario's homicide case, looking for records pertaining to him and his activities. His alleged killer had been shot and killed on July 29.

On August 24, 2007, La ONU again suffered a loss when "Pito Paz" was murdered in the Monte Hatillo Public Housing Project in San Juan, Puerto Rico.

On April 29, 2009, La ONU suffered one of its most significant losses when Wilfredo Maldonado Rosario (aka "Chino Valencia"), a childhood friend of "Angelo Millones", and an important member of La ONU, was killed on Puerto Rico Highway 863 in Toa Baja. The murder occurred as part of an internal war that had broken out earlier in the year in the Bayamón region.

A revenge order was fulfilled a week later, on May 5, and became the second massacre of 2009. The objective was 25-year-old Alexis Olivo Marrero (aka "Alexis El Loco"), who lived in Toa Alta and had been named as "Chino Valencia's" killer. "El Loco" was ambushed by 10 gunmen at 4:15 p.m. at a shopping center near the Plaza Pharmacy in the Pájaros neighborhood of Toa Baja. There, Alexis "El Loco", his two-year-old daughter, Arielys Olivo Ortiz, and his sixteen-year-old son, Angel Vargas Soto, were killed. His wife, Claribel Ortiz, and their other son, Alex Adriel, were injured. The gunmen arrived in five vehicles and fired with nine rifles and eight guns, which left 280 caps on the ground as proof of the cruelty of the incident. The massacre brought federal and local accusations against the 10 gunmen, and profoundly altered the leadership within the organization. On September 18 of the same year, "Angelo Millones" was arrested by a contingent of agents of the Federal Drug Administration (DEA), of the Federal Bureau of Investigation (FBI) and of the Bayamón Strike Force, who had been watching him for months.

In 2012, a contingent of agents broke into several communities in Río Piedras and Carolina in search of some ONU members and made two arrests, but 18 of the defendants were already detained in criminal institutions in Puerto Rico and the United States. Members were charged with a series of murders, including the death of agent Blanca De Los Santos Barbosa in recorded events of July 7, 2010 and the pilot Jesús Quiñones Santiago on May 4 of the same year. Governor Luis Fortuño declared three days of mourning after the death of De Los Santos Barbosa.

La Rompe ONU
- Territory: Puerto Rico
- Ethnicity: Puerto Ricans
- Membership: c.150 members
- Activities: drug trafficking, arms trafficking, murders, contract killings
- Rivals: La ONU

== La Rompe ONU ==
La Rompe ONU ("ONU Breakers") is a rival organization which is also devoted to the drug trade in Puerto Rico. Rompe ONU was first organized by several former ONU members and has been involved in a violent war against ONU members. In 2015, 105 persons linked to Rompe ONU were arrested by the ATF and the Puerto Rico Police.

== In music ==
In early 2019, a Latin trap song called La calle está en fuego (transl. The streets are on fire) was released by El Enmascarao (transl. The Masked One). The song seems to include a spoken message from "Angel Millones", in a telephone call from prison, where he says "I'm not dead, I'm in jail" and "atentamente" (transl. "sincerely"), "El Negro", "Angel Millones", "El Buster" and "however you want to remember me" - referring to his various nicknames. He also says, "the same people are still running the streets".

== See also ==
- Illegal drugs in Puerto Rico
