= Residencial Nemesio R. Canales =

Apartments complex in Puerto Rico

Coordinates: 18°25′16″N 66°4′45″W

Residencial Nemesio R. Canales is an apartment complex in San Juan, Puerto Rico. One of the largest residenciales in Puerto Rico with 1,500 apartments, the complex is adjacent to the Caribbean's largest mall and second largest in Latin America, Plaza Las Americas. It is also steps away from both Roberto Clemente Coliseum and the Hiram Bithorn Stadium. The place is named after Nemesio Canales, a well known Puerto Rican essayist, writer, journalist and politician.

The residencial features a public school and a Pentecostal church, the "Iglesia de Dios Pentecostal M.I. del Residencial Nemesio R. Canales".

== History ==
For decades, residencial Nemesio R. Canales has seen illegal drug trade activity. The residencial has sometimes been embattled in drug wars between cartels operating there and those operating at Residencial Luis Lloréns Torres and other areas of the country.

This problem continued well into the 21st century, with arrests and murders, at both residenciales, being commonplace.

== See also ==
- Residencial Las Casas – a nearby residencial and former commercial airport
- Public housing in Puerto Rico
