= José Juan García =

Puerto Rican businessman (1940–2002)

- Born: October 22, 1940; Rio Piedras, Puerto Rico
- Died: December 17, 2002 (aged 62); San Juan, Puerto Rico
- Other name: "CheJuan"
- Known for: Founder of Hogar CREA
- Spouse(s): Flora Rosario Johnson, Ramonita "Monín" Beltrán-Rivera
- Children: José Javier García Beltrán

José Juan García a.k.a. CheJuan (October 22, 1940 – December 17, 2002) was the founder of the international drug-rehabilitation institution called Hogar CREA.

== Early years ==
García was born in Río Piedras, Puerto Rico, where he was raised by his parents. He had a difficult childhood and was first imprisoned at the age of 15. At a young age, he became addicted to drugs and stole to pay for his habit. He was imprisoned more than once because of his drug problems. However, he later met people who had a positive influence on his life and contributed to his change, among them the educator Ana G. Méndez. He also attributed his acceptance of "Christ" as a reason for his change.

== Hogar CREA ==
In 1968, García founded in Puerto Rico a drug-rehabilitiation organization named Hogar CREA (plural Hogares CREA). The acronym "CREA" stands for the 're-education of the addict'. Those who enter the program do not have to pay a fee, but must agree to the program's strict rules and engage in community service.

Doctors, psychologists and others donate their time. Expenses are covered by the volunteer board of each home. Each home has enough beds for 15 people. 28 thousand people have successfully completed the program, out of 51 thousand addicts who have been treated in 36 years. In is estimated that 92% of those who have completed the program started by García, have completely stayed out of drugs.

García's Hogares CREA have over 152 facilities worldwide, including in the United States, Dominican Republic, Costa Rica, Venezuela, Colombia, Panama, El Salvador, Honduras and Nicaragua.

== Awards and recognitions ==
Among the awards and recognitions he received are:

- The Citizen of the Year in 1974, granted by the Puerto Rico Manufacturers Association
- Citizen of the Year 1976, by the Puerto Rico Chamber of Commerce
- An award from President Ronald Reagan and others for the exemplary community service offered by Hogar CREA in the United States.
- The Government of Puerto Rico named a plaza in Rio Piedras "Plaza José Juan 'Cheguan' García".

== Later years ==
José Juan García died on December 22, 2002, in San Juan, Puerto Rico from cancer. His son Javier García and his widow Flora Rosario Johnson were involved in a dispute over the control of the organization. The organizations current director is Benjamin Pintor Miranda.

== See also ==
- List of Puerto Ricans
