= Gaspar Roca =

Puerto Rican journalist and economist (1926–2007)

Gaspar Roca Bacó
- Born: October 1, 1926; Yauco, Puerto Rico
- Died: April 8, 2007 (aged 80); Hato Rey, Puerto Rico
- Occupations: journalist, economist, editor
- Spouse: Maria Luis Roca
- Children: Gaspar Luis Roca Stefani, Miguel Roca, Diana Roca, Anne Marie Roca, Carlos Roca

Gaspar Roca (October 1, 1926 – April 8, 2007) was a Puerto Rican journalist and economist. He attended and graduated from the Valley Forge Military Academy He was educated at Wharton School, University of Pennsylvania, and held prominent positions in government and the private sector, including the presidency of the Puerto Rico Industrial Development Company (PRIDCO).

== Journalism ==
Roca was the founder and editor of the Puerto Rican newspaper El Vocero, filling a market niche for a crime-oriented tabloid, left by the closing of El Imparcial. Under his editorship, El Vocero evolved into a mainstream newspaper with legitimate news articles, a well-known set of columnists and journalists, including Luis Dávila Colón, Obed Betancourt, Julio Víctor Ramírez, Sr., José Luis Purcell, Tomás De Jesús Mangual, Miguel Rivera Puig, Roberto García López, Luis Colón, Cruz Roqué Vicens, Maggie Bobb, José Arsenio Torres, Roberto Rexach Benítez, Eudaldo Báez Galib and Juan Manuel García Passalacqua, and a wide variety of sections and supplements.

=== Press freedom ===
One of his contributions to journalism was his willingness to bankroll freedom of information lawsuits, that have opened government to intense press and public scrutiny. An example is the United States Supreme Court decision declaring unconstitutional the Puerto Rico judiciary's rule barring the press from over 30,000 yearly closed-door preliminary hearings where probable-cause was determined in criminal proceedings (El Vocero de Puerto Rico vs Puerto Rico, 508 US 147 (1993)). Other examples include the 1992 lawsuit that forced political candidates to make public their personal finances, and the case declaring unconstitutional Puerto Rico's "criminal defamation" law, that had a limiting effect on the exercise of press freedom right in Puerto Rico.

Journalism in Puerto Rico, and in the United States, has benefitted from these judicial victories. For example, many freedom of the press court cases and lawsuits filed before state and federal courts cite the holding in El Vocero's 1993 US Supreme Court case.

== See also ==
- List of Puerto Ricans
