= Quirino Paulino =

Dominican drug boss (born 1976)

Paulino Organization
- La Organizacion
- Years active: 2001 -2004
- Territory: Dominican Republic, Haiti, Puerto Rico, New York City, Florida
- Ethnicity: Dominicans, Dominican Americans
- Membership: over 60 members
- Criminal activities: drug trafficking, corruption, money laundering
- Allies: La Oficina de Envigado, Clan del Golfo, Trinitarios, corrupt military oficers and politicians
- Rivals: Martinez Familia Sangeros

Quirino Ernesto Paulino Castillo, a.k.a. "El Don" (July 12th 1976 -) in Comendador, Elías Piña Province) is an ex-captain of the army of the Dominican Republic, and alleged boss of a drug-trafficking organization responsible for importing tons of cocaine into the United States since September 2003. Paulino's personal fortune was estimated at $2 billion dollars.

== Background of the Paulino Organization ==
Paulino was raised in the Elías Piña province of the Dominican Republic. He began his military career in the National Army in 2001 and soon after, he discovered the profits to be made in illegal trading over the border with Haiti. Under civilian and military protection, Paulino increased his wealth and assets, and immersed himself in politics, commerce, banking, agriculture, and military activities. Since September 2003, Paulino headed a cocaine trafficking organization that transferred cocaine from South America (primarily from Colombia and Venezuela) via the Dominican Republic en route to the United States. The organization used a variety of routes to send the cocaine from the Dominican Republic and/or Haiti towards Puerto Rico to the U.S. mainland, including New York City. After the drug was received and distributed in the United States, the profits were returned to several bank accounts in the Dominican Republic.

== Arrest and Controversy ==
Paulino was arrested by DEA special agent Erik Pepen following the confiscation of 1,387 kilos of cocaine linked to him on December 19, 2004. The confiscated cocaine had an estimated value of RD$900 million (approx. US$26,400,000). Paulino was extradited to the United States for hearings of a drug-smuggling case pending in New Jersey. Paulino's extradition is the first under a newly adopted criminal code in the Dominican Republic, and was the result of a joint investigation involving cooperation between the U.S. Drug Enforcement Administration (DEA) and the Dominican Government's National Direction for Drug Control (Dirección Nacional de Control de Drogas, or DNCD). The investigation was sponsored by the U.S. Organized Crime Drug Enforcement Task Force (OCDETF).

=== Political and Military Links ===
The depth of Paulino's links to the highest levels of Dominican political parties and military have been of primary concern to law enforcement. Paulino entered the National Army with the rank of 'Sergeant Major' on March 9, 2002. Five months later, former Army Chief General, fired him on August 1, 2002. One year later, on September 10, 2003, after Jorge Radhamés Zorrilla Ozuna replaced Polanco, Paulino was reinstated into the Army, being promoted to First Lieutenant of the National Army by memorandum 32070 signed by former Secretary of the Dominican Armed Forces, Major General General Soto Jiménez following instructions from former president Hipólito Mejía. Paulino's Army record indicates that Zorrilla recommended that he be readmitted into the National Army and promoted. Former Secretary General of the Dominican Armed Forces Major General Soto has since told prosecutors that he did not personally know Paulino.

The Dominican newspaper El Listín Diario published a report in which claimed that in addition to the RD$2 million Paulino donated to the Dominican Revolutionary Party (Partido Revolucionario Dominicano) for the construction of the gate of the elementary and high schools in Comendador, capital of Elías Piña Province, he also donated a vehicle to the Municipal Committee of the Dominican Liberation Party Partido de la Liberacion Dominicana and is also known to have made donations to the Christian Social Reformist Party Partido Reformista Social Cristiano politicians in the area. The report points out that Paulino employed engineer Henry Duval, a PLD director, who was director of the INDRHI in San Juan de la Maguana during the 1996-2000 Fernández Administration as chief of irrigation in one of his farms in 2000 when the latter was fired from his government post with the change of government. Duval, after working four years for Paulino, was appointed again to his previous government post by the present government. The newspaper also mentions that Paulino appointed as chief of his veterinarian staff Rafael A. Svelti Hermon, another PLD activist and former director of cattle ranching for the government in San Juan de la Maguana, once he was fired with the change of government in 2000. Hermon was reinstated in his former post when Fernández returned to government on August 16, 2004. He was sworn in as a member of the PRD before the 2004 elections by the brother-in-law of the candidate and then president Hipolito Mejia.

In April 2004, Major General Furcy Castellanos, chief of Army Intelligence (J2) revealed that the armed forces alerted former president Mejía that the U.S. Drug Enforcement Administration was on Paulino's trail. He explained that Mejía did not adhere to the recommendations of removing him reportedly because of the proximity of the May elections.

== Trial Complications ==
In February 2005, District Attorney José Manuel Hernández Peguero said that Doris Pujols Ortiz, the judge in charge of the Paulino case in the Dominican Republic has extended the investigative process term given the complexity of the case. The trial against Paulino and other 20 defendants charged with drug trafficking in New York, could begin in September 2006.

After Paulino's arrest, more than 60 other Dominicans considered an important part of the network were arrested and later extradited, including Lidio Nin Terrero, Eduardo Rodríguez (Eduardito), Bladimir Garcia Jimenez, José Ramón Ortega, Erwin Mendez, César Bueno, and Tirso Cuevas Nin. Most of the group is in prison, some have not contracted attorneys and a few have been released on bail, although with severe restrictions. The U.S. vs Paulino criminal case is being heard in New York’s South District Court by judge Kimba Wood. Among the reasons why the judges have denied releasing the majority of the suspects on bail is that they do not have properties in United States which can be presented as guarantee, that they have guarantees in other countries or their country of origin, and that they could possibly escape and become fugitives.

== See also ==
- Military of the Dominican Republic
- Vladimir Pujols
- Los Zayayines
- Baninter
