= José López Rosario =

Puerto Rican criminal

- Born: José L. López Rosario; September 18, 1976; Carolina, Puerto Rico
- Died: July 28, 2006 (aged 29); Río Piedras, Puerto Rico
- Other name: Coquito Coco blin blin
- Occupation: Drug dealer

José "Coquito" López Rosario (September 18, 1976 – July 28, 2006 ) was a Puerto Rican drug dealer and kingpin as well as a mafia boss. Lopez Rosario's death caused a scandal in Puerto Rico because of his alleged ties to prominent politicians. José was the boss of one of the 3 families that compose the Puerto Rican mafia. He was actually the founder of the López Rosario family named after him. There was also Quitoni a.k.a. El Gran who was the Top Boss of the Puerto Rican mafia. As well as the leader of the Vega Family named after its leader Ivan Vega. These men formed the Puerto Rican mafia that José was a part of.

== Biography ==
López Rosario was born on September 18, 1976, and grew up in the Torres de Sabana Housing Project in Carolina, Puerto Rico. He enjoyed baseball and became known for his ability to play that sport as a teenager

According to police records, López Rosario rose to prominence in the underworld after the alleged former Puerto Rican mafia bosses were sent to jail or killed. He lived in Villa Carolina, a neighborhood in the city of Carolina, but supposedly set up his drug dealing business in Torres de Sabana, where he was from. It is there where he noticed Junior Nunie Mendez Santiago, a kid allegedly known by locals for his violent temper and street smarts.Jose Lopez Rosario and Junior Mendez Santiago had a brotherly bond that lasted to the end of Coquito's life.

== Musical career ==
López Rosario started a career as a producer of reggaeton music. He was the owner of Blin Blin Music and managed artists like Plan B. López was also known for organizing huge parties and musical events for his community. During his musical career, he had ties with artists such as Daddy Yankee, Don Omar, Tito El Bambino, Tego Calderón, Zion & Lennox, and others. He had a participation in the movie Talento de barrio played by Daddy Yankee in which he performed the character Juan de Dios the movie was released in 2008 two years after his death.Before the premiere of the film, Daddy Yankee said the following:Reggaeton is not financed by peoples of the underworld, the participation of Coquito and the crossroads faced by the character of Yankee ("Edgar Dinero") should not be conceived as an endorsement subtle to criminal activity. “It's in the movie. He was my lifelong brother and I respect him a lot. I never knew that life of Coco (the one that is the object of investigation). I met a guy from music who was dedicated to his business. And what I can say is that the man did an amazing acting role. He auditioned and ate everybody there,” said Yankee, who had known him since childhood. “Coco is in the movie and he was my lifelong brother” The role of Coquito corresponds to that of a partner of "Edgar Dinero", a young man who must decide between whether to abandon life in the underworld and dedicate himself to music. “When I meet Coco and he auditions, I discover that the guy has tremendous talent as well. I feel happy, because I supported someone who is a talent from the neighborhood and I was able to get the best out of the guy, "explained Yankee, recalling the characterization of López, who, however, does not appear in the credits of the film. Yankee does not consider that Coquito's intervention reinforces the perception that urban music is sponsored by the underworld. “No, because I speak of living examples. I, Daddy Yankee, have supported my projects out of my own pocket. I know all the people in the neighborhood. And Coco was an athlete, a baseball player and a positive guy.”

== Murder and political scandal ==
López Rosario died six days later at Centro Medico in Río Piedras, Puerto Rico after being shot. His alleged killer, Wilfredo, was shot one day after López' death. Wilfredo was rumored to have been shot by one of the men that was in the Puerto Rican mafia as a revenge sent out by Quitoni Martinez.

It was later revealed that López Rosario had been part of PNP senator Héctor Martínez's entourage as part of the Public Safety Commission and the Parole Commission, even making visits with Martínez to prisons. The residents of Torres de Sabana made a mural in his honor that was later erased by the Puerto Rico police.

== See also ==
- Crime in Puerto Rico
- Illegal drugs in Puerto Rico
