= 2023 Carolina, Puerto Rico, massacre =

2023 massacre in Carolina, Puerto Rico

On July 25, 2023, five children, four of them teenagers from the southern city of Guayama, were murdered and had their bodies were found in barrio Martín González, in the northern city of Carolina and in neighboring Loíza. The people who were found murdered in Carolina were identified by Puerto Rico's police as 27-year-old Eric Johan Batista Trinidad Navarro, 18-year-old Dartaneon Pablo Figueroa Navarro, and 15-year-old Iván Alfonso Morales Rivera, while the two young women found dead in Loíza were identified as 13-year-old Nahia Paola Ramos López and her best friend, 15-year-old Tanaisha Michelle De Jesús Curet. Police believe that, while the five bodies were found in different cities, the murders are related.

== Before the murders ==
Nahia Ramos went to visit her friend Tanaisha De Jesús on July 24 and to stay at her friend's house. Sometime after Tanaisha's adoptive mom, Maribel Curet, went to sleep, the two girls left the house. Tanaisha De Jesús had recently composed a poster which she gave Nahia, asking her on it to be her best friend. Nahia was about to turn 14 years old on Friday, July 28th. Nahia wrote "yes" as an answer on the poster and circled her answer with a heart drawing. This happened the day before their murders.

Meanwhile, Iván Morales was a suspect of and had been interrogated as part of an investigation concerning an earlier massacre that had taken place at El Campesino, a local business in Guayama, where three people had died. He was also suspected of four carjackings that had taken place recently in the southern city of Ponce.

The previous Sunday, a Toyota Tacoma vehicle was stolen from a businessman in Ponce. Police identified the vehicle in which the two young girls were found as the one that was reported stolen.

== Murders ==
The three males were murdered in Carolina, while the two females were taken to the Loíza area of Piñones, near Luis Muñoz Marín International Airport, and were killed there. The two females were found inside the stolen Toyota Tacoma.

Police have linked the males' murders with those of the females, because Tanaisha's mom contacted her son and asked him to call Tanaisha. When Tanaisha's phone rang, it was answered by a man who said he was in Carolina, and the police found the three males' bodies very close to where the call was answered.

== Investigation ==
Coronel Roberto Rivera of the Puerto Rico police declared that the five deaths were related. Agent Torres of the Carolina homicides division and prosecutor José Carrasquillo were placed in charge of the investigation. The FBI joined the investigation by way of agent Joseph Gonzalez, special agent in charge of the FBI's San Juan field office.

Meanwhile, a year after the tragic events, the mothers of the two murdered teenage girls declared they do not want the death penalty for whoever murdered them.

== Reactions ==
Pedro Pierluisi, the then governor of Puerto Rico, (who lost a brother to murder) made a statement about the crimes saying that many issues need to be addressed to get to the root of the problem of crime in Puerto Rico.

== Suspects ==
Puerto Rico police arrested Jose Martinez Serrano and Edwin Yadiel Flores Tavares in relation with the murders of the two young girls. According to the U.S. Attorney for the District of Puerto Rico, W. Stephen Muldrow, they have been indicted by a federal grand jury.

== See also ==
- Crime in Puerto Rico
- Cayey Massacre
