= Escuela Industrial para Mujeres Vega Alta =

Women's prison in Vega Alta, Puerto Rico

Coordinates: 18°24′44″N 66°18′49″W

Escuela Industrial para Mujeres (Industrial School for Women)
- Interactive map of Escuela Industrial para Mujeres (Industrial School for Women)
- Location: Vega Alta, Puerto Rico
- Status: Operational
- Capacity: 471
- Opened: 1954
- Managed by: Puerto Rico Department of Corrections and Rehabilitation

The Escuela Industrial para Mujeres (Industrial School for Women) is a women's prison in Vega Alta, Puerto Rico. The facility has an official capacity of 471 inmates, and opened in 1954.

There were 420 women incarcerated in 2015; 97 were imprisoned for controlled substances violations and another 97 for property crimes. At least 257 inmates had no criminal record prior to the conviction for which they were incarcerated.

In 2012 federal judge Daniel R. Domínguez for the United States District Court for the District of Puerto Rico allowed an inmates' suit to go forward. The inmates sought damages from an incident where more masculine prisoners were segregated, herded into a visitation area, and taunted and threatened for days.

In a 2009 paper, researchers interviewed inmates and found that the hospital facilities lacked hot water and air conditioning, and provided one bathroom for between 20 and 25 inmates. Inmates with diverse conditions, including mental illness, hepatitis, and HIV could not access treatment. The prison was failing to offer court-ordered programs, leaving some inmates in technical violation of the requirements of their sentences.
