= Cimarron Correctional Facility =

Prison in Oklahoma, United States

Coordinates: 35°56′34″N 96°47′03″W

- Interactive map of Cimarron Correctional Facility
- Location: 3200 S. Kings Highway, Cushing, Oklahoma
- Status: Closed
- Security class: Federal
- Capacity: 1650
- Opened: 1997
- Closed: 2020
- Managed by: CoreCivic

Cimarron Correctional Facility was a medium security prison in unincorporated Payne County, Oklahoma, located 3 miles (4.8 km) southwest of the city of Cushing. It is owned and operated by CoreCivic, formerly Corrections Corporation of America, under contract with the United States Marshals Service.

The prison was built in 1997, and as of 2015 had a "contracted capacity" for 1,650 inmates, 1,470 medium-security and 180 maximum-security.

CCA has also imported prisoners for detention here. In 2012, the Puerto Rico Department of Corrections and Rehabilitation agreed to send as many as 480 inmates to Cimarron, to alleviate overcrowded prisons on the island. The three-year contract was ended prematurely in June 2013 after unit-wide fights and "disruptive events", and the inmates were sent back to Puerto Rico.

In June 2015 a fight among inmates sent eleven of them to the hospital. The fight involved up to 300 people. In September 2015, another fight took the lives of four inmates, all stabbed to death, and left another three wounded; this was the worst such incident in state history.

On May 16, 2017, a guard deployed pepper spray on an inmate. Other inmates attacked the guard, and in the melee, an additional four guards were injured. All personnel involved required hospital treatment.

Due to reductions by the Oklahoma Department of Corrections in the number of inmates put in private prisons because of budgetary issues, CoreCivic announced closure of the facility in July 2020, with inmates transferred to two other prisons it owned in Oklahoma.

== See also ==
- Oklahoma Department of Corrections
