= Alex Trujillo (drug dealer) =

Puerto Rican former drug dealer

Alexander Capó Carrillo (born April 23, 1983), better known as Alex Trujillo is a Puerto Rican former drug dealer. Reformed from his days in crime, Trujillo is a born again Christian.

Alexander Capó Carillo known as Alex Trujillo is the son of Luis Alberto Capó, a liquor store owner who was once arrested and charged with illegal gun ownership, and Carmen Aida Carrillo. He began his life in crime at age 14, dealing drugs at Residencial Manuel A. Perez in Hato Rey, an area of San Juan. Trujillo later expanded his operations to Residencial Nemesio Canales.

According to the case, "United States vs. Rodriguez", soon after the murder of two drug dealers, one nicknamed "Bebe" and another nicknamed "Trumpi", at Residencial Covadonga and the run-out from the area of another one nicknamed "Casi", Trujillo joined "Bebe"s brother in law in running the drug trade from that area, including sales of cocaine.

When Trujillo was 16, his older brother, Polanski Capó was murdered at age 21 on May 18, 2000, in retaliation for Trujillo's profession.

Trujillo evaded justice and was among the most wanted, but he was arrested on December 5, 2006, and sentenced to 20 years in prison on June 28, 2007, after declaring himself guilty during March of the same year, for drug trafficking. Trujillo was arrested again in February 2007, when he allegedly controlled 15 drug sales points in San Juan. According to the Orlando Sentinel, a drug war between competing factions arose after his capture, with newer gangs trying to break into Trujillo's former dealing spots. Some time after his arrest, police arrested six members of his gang who were apparently trying to cause a massacre of rival gang members.

== Life in jail ==
Trujillo's attorneys in 2019 asked for a reduction in his sentence.

Trujillo became a newborn Christian in jail. He had a Bible with him the day he was arrested, and immediately after being jailed asked for a meeting with a religious leader, pastor Edgardo Aubray. He began weekly meetings with the religious leader and found out that among other inmates near him there was the Puerto Rican politician, Jorge de Castro Font. The two began meeting every night for prayer.

Later on, Trujillo was moved to Federal Correctional Institution, Jesup in Jesup, Georgia, where he ran into the man sentenced for his brother Polanki's 2000 murder. The two embraced and Trujillo allegedly asked him for forgiveness in case he ever attempted against the man's life and told him he forgave him for the murder of Polanski.

Trujillo has written letters to Puerto Rican schools to advise students to stay off the drug business and drugs in general and to ask for forgiveness for crimes against the community. He is a preacher whose Christian testimony has appeared on various media outlets, including YouTube.

Trujillo was paroled on November 2, 2021.

== See also ==
- List of Puerto Ricans
- Edsel Torres Gomez
- Jose Garcia Cosme
- Jaime Dávila Reyes
