= 2009 Sabana Seca massacre =

Mass shooting in Puerto Rico

The 2009 Sabana Seca massacre, also referred to as La Masacre de La Tómbola, was an incident that occurred on October 17, 2009, in Puerto Rico related to drug trafficking. Eight people were killed by gunmen in a car, who shot randomly in a bar in the Sabana Seca barrio of Toa Baja, 15 miles from San Juan. Twenty people, some related to two different bands between drug dealers, were wounded in the shooting. The two gunmen, Alexis Candelario Santana, 42, and David Oquendo Rivas, were convicted by a federal jury on March 8, 2013, and sentenced to life in prison without the possibility of parole.

== The shooting ==
On October 17, 2009, at approximately 11:50 pm, Alexis Candelario Santana and David Oquendo-Rivas arrived at the grand opening of the La Tómbola pub. Armed with several types of semi-automatic pistols and semi-automatic sporting rifles including .9mm semi-automatic pistols, 40 caliber semi-automatic pistols, 45 caliber semi-automatic pistols, AK-47 and AR-15 type rifles, the pair opened fire on the patrons congregating outside of the pub. They soon entered the building and continued to fire rounds throughout the establishment. Among those deceased included six men (three of which were Candelario-Santana's godson, Rondón-Feliciano's stepson and Candelario-Santana's cousin) one pregnant woman, and her unborn child. Another 19 pub patrons were injured and taken to Rio Piedras Medical Center where three of those injured underwent surgery for their wounds.

== The trial ==
This incident was investigated by the FBI alongside the Puerto Rico Police Department. Documents spanning from 1993 to 2003 which were used as evidence to convict Candelario-Santana showed that he controlled a drug trafficking organization centered in the Sabana Seca area of Toa Baja, Puerto Rico. Candelario-Santana's organization sold numerous drugs bought from several sellers including crack, cocaine, heroin, and marijuana. The trial also introduced evidence that Candelario-Santana either orchestrated or committed the murders himself of 13 people he thought posed a threat to his operation between 1995 and 2001. The assailants, Alexis Candelario-Santana and David Oquendo-Rivas, faced life in prison after being convicted on March 8, 2013, for the murders of eight individuals, an unborn child, and the attempted murder of the other twenty injured people. Both were brought up on the following charges; 28 counts of violent crime in aid of criminal activity, one count of criminal conspiracy, nine counts firearm possession and use during a crime of violence, one count of drug trafficking, and one count of possession of a firearm with a prior conviction as Candelario-Santana previously been incarcerated. On August 23, 2017, the federal court ordered a new trial seeking death sentences for both defendants starting with jury selection on August 1, 2018. The government later decided to only seek a death sentence for Candelario-Santana. Both men were found guilty, albeit the jury spared Candelario-Santana's life. They were sentenced to life in prison without parole.

== See also ==
- 2023 Carolina, Puerto Rico massacre
