= Alexis Candelario Santana =

Puerto Rican convicted criminal

Alexis Candelario Santana (born 1972) is a Puerto Rican convicted criminal and former leader of a drug cartel. In March 2013, he was sentenced for the 2009 deaths of nine persons, including an unborn girl, and the attempted murders of 19 others during the 2009 Sabana Seca massacre. The Court of Appeals for the First Circuit later ordered a retrial. On July 21, 2023, he was found guilty following a retrial.

== Biography ==
Candelario Santana's criminal record links him to multiple crimes committed since about 1991. Starting in 1996, the organization he led allegedly trafficked marijuana, cocaine, heroin and crack drugs.

Together with Braulio "Menor" Rodriguez, Candelario Santana formed a cartel known as the Palo de Goma drug point. The cartel controlled much of the drug sales in the area, until Candelario Santana flew to Michigan in order to avoid arrest by the Puerto Rican police, leaving Carmelo Rondon Feliciano and Candelario Santana's cousin, Wilfredo Semprit Santana, as the cartel's figureheads.

Candelario Santana was eventually arrested, flown back to Puerto Rico and convicted in 2003 of ordering or committing himself twelve murders, for which he was jailed until 2009.

== Massacre ==
A few months after Candelario Santana was released, the 2009 La Tombola massacre occurred in Toa Baja, Puerto Rico. Following Candelario Santana's 2003 jailing, control of the drug trade in Toa Baja went to other people, and Candelario Santana suspected the owners of La Tombola, a new bar about to open in the city of Toa Baja, to be among the persons now in charge of his old business. Allegedly Candelario Santana planned executing them before he left prison.

La Tombola was a bar in Toa Baja which had been closed, then re-opened under ownership of Wilfredo Semprit Santana, some two weeks before the shooting took place.

On Saturday, October 17, 2009, about 11:45 PM, there were some 100 people at and around La Tombola, celebrating the bar's inauguration and re-opening, including those inside the bar as well as many who were lined up in front of a vending cart to buy food just outside La Tombola, as well as a nine-year-old girl who was at an unspecified spot outside the bar and three members of a girl music group named Bomba Swing, who had come as paid entertainment to the inauguration.

Nine people died during the violent act, including an unborn baby girl, her mother, a singer and member of Bomba Swing and Candelario Santana's godson, who was allegedly shot by Candelario Santana himself. 19 others, including the young girl outside the bar, were injured but survived.

== Arrest and trial ==
Candelario Santana went into hiding immediately and the Puerto Rican police initially had difficulty finding him. He had gone to St. Thomas island in the United States Virgin Islands, where he was arrested on the night of November 16 and then flown back to Puerto Rico.

On March 8, 2013, Candelario Santana and David Oquendo Rivas were convicted by a federal judge; in Candelario Santana's case, he was convicted of a total of 40 counts in various crimes, all committed during the La Tombola massacre. He was eligible for the death penalty, but on March 23, a jury viewing his case did not reach a unanimity in voting for the death penalty for Candelario Santana, therefore, he was sentenced to life in prison. On August 23, 2017 the federal court ordered a new trial seeking the death penalty for both defendants starting with jury selection on August 1, 2018. On July 21, 2023, Candelario Santana was found guilty following a retrial. He is given BOP# 53550-424 and incarcerated at USP Marion
