= Hogar CREA =

Drug rehab center founded in Puerto Rico

- Founded: 1968
- Founder: José Juan García
- Headquarters: Puerto Rico
- Number of locations: 152 facilities worldwide
- Website: www.hogar-crea.org

Hogar CREA is an international drug rehabilitation institution founded in Puerto Rico. It is often referred to in the plural, Hogares CREA.

== History ==
In 1968, José Juan García founded Hogar CREA. The acronym is for a Spanish phrase, comunidad de reeducación para adictos meaning 'community for the re-education of addicts'; crea is also a word meaning 'creates', and Hogar Crea translates to 'Home Creates'.

Participants were required to attend church services on Sundays until a court ruling changed that. Participants are known for selling desserts such as caramel custards. They also wash cars and do community service. The program is funded by both the United States federal government and the Puerto Rican government.

Hogares CREA has over 152 facilities worldwide. Besides Puerto Rico, facilities are also established in Florida, Costa Rica, Venezuela, Colombia, Dominican Republic, Panama, El Salvador, Honduras, and Nicaragua.
