= Operation Lost Honor =

FBI investigation into law enforcement corruption in Puerto Rico

Operation Lost Honor was the English translation of the name of a prominent investigation, "Honor Perdido." The investigation targeted police corruption in Puerto Rico that took place in August 2001. Organized by the US Federal Bureau of Investigation (FBI) and led by Special Agent Jeffrey Pelaez,Puerto Rico Police Officer Elvin Quinones, and undercover agent Arturo Ortiz (EXPO), the investigation was initiated in response to multiple reports about illegal activity within the Puerto Rico Police Department (PRPD). The twelve-month-long undercover operation targeted law enforcement officials suspected of involvement with the drug trade on the island. At the time it was the biggest case of officer corruption that the FBI had ever dealt with.

== Chain of events ==
Thirty-two police officers were caught on videotape trafficking drugs in the undercover operation by the elite FBI Special Operations Group (SOG). Initiated after receiving multiple reports of police officers involved directly in drug trafficking, police officers were videotaped unloading boats carrying cocaine, transporting cocaine in their squad cars, providing advice on the best way to dispose of homicide victims, and offering to commit murder. The operation additionally aimed to stop the illicit protection provided to some cocaine dealers who shipped their contraband throughout the island. Thirty-four individuals were arrested in the case. Criminal activities offered by the targeted officers include one individual's agreement to kill a drug dealer for US$20,000 in cash. An evidence technician provided help on how to dispose of a homicide victim. Rogelio Guevara, special agent in charge of the DEA's Caribbean Field Division, commented that those arrested "don't deserve the honor of being called police officers".

== Aftermath ==
Operation Lost Honor was the biggest case of officer corruption that the FBI had ever dealt with. Orlando Sentinel journalist Ivan Roman said that the bust "stunned a department already reeling from a series of" previous scandals.

Continuing issues regarding police misconduct and other problems dogged the PRPD years after Operation Lost Honor.

== See also ==
- Operation Guard Shack
