= Tony Tursi =

Italian-American criminal (1901–1989)

Anthony Tursi
- Born: February 16, 1901
- Died: April 22, 1989 (aged 88)
- Occupations: Organized crime figure, Nightclub owner
- Known for: Owning the La Riviera nightclub in San Juan, Puerto Rico, associated with organized crime.
- Conviction: Guilty plea
- Criminal charges: Possession of stolen blank airline tickets
- Penalty: $5,000 fine and five years' imprisonment
- Accomplice: Philip Tursi (son)

Tursi family
- Years active: 1950s - 1976
- Territory: Puerto Rico
- Ethnicity: Italian Americans
- Criminal activities: gambling, money laundering, corruption, pimping, usury, fencing of stolen goods
- Allies: Tampa crime family

Anthony Tursi (February 16, 1901 – April 22, 1989) was an Italian-American organized crime figure associated with San Juan, Puerto Rico from the 1950s to the 1970s. Within the history of crime in Puerto Rico, he attracted notice primarily for owning the notable nightclub La Riviera.

While his operations faced frequent interruptions by the Puerto Rican government, he managed to achieve success in the territory's underworld for many years. One particular raid, he later recalled, had involved the arrest of over 300 women by anti-vice officers. The "farce", as he called it, of police raids wound up frightening prostitutes off of the streets and rebounding things in his favor, with Tursi controlling his own established locations. Historian Stan Steiner labeled him as a "night-club impresario".

== La Riviera ==
Tursi gained fame as the owner of the La Riviera, a nightclub in San Juan, Puerto Rico well known for its association with easy prostitution. A popular attraction for not only locals but also expatriates and tourists, La Riveria faced the danger of constant raids by the police, though this didn't phase Tursi.

== Politics ==
Tursi also took interest in civic affairs. He ran unsuccessfully for Mayor of San Juan as a political independent in 1968. His write-in campaign used the simple slogan "Vota Por Tursi".

== Imprisonment ==
In 1976, Tursi and his son Philip Tursi pleaded guilty to possessing 2,400 stolen blank tickets for Eastern Airlines. Part of the plea bargain deal involved granting youthful offender status and probation to Philip. On February 20, 1976, the court fined Anthony Tursi $5,000 and sentenced him to five years' imprisonment, to be served consecutively to a sentence in Puerto Rico. The court also sentenced fined Philip Tursi $5,000 and sentenced him to imprisonment of one year and one day. Anthony Tursi later appealed the verdict based on Philip's sentence, but the appeal was denied.

== Death ==
He was released on November 30, 1979. Tursi then retired to Nevada, where he died on April 22, 1989.

== See also ==
- List of Puerto Ricans
- List of crime bosses
