= Río Piedras State Penitentiary =

Correctional facility in Puerto Rico (demolished)

- Puerto Rico Island Penitentiary
- U.S. National Register of Historic Places
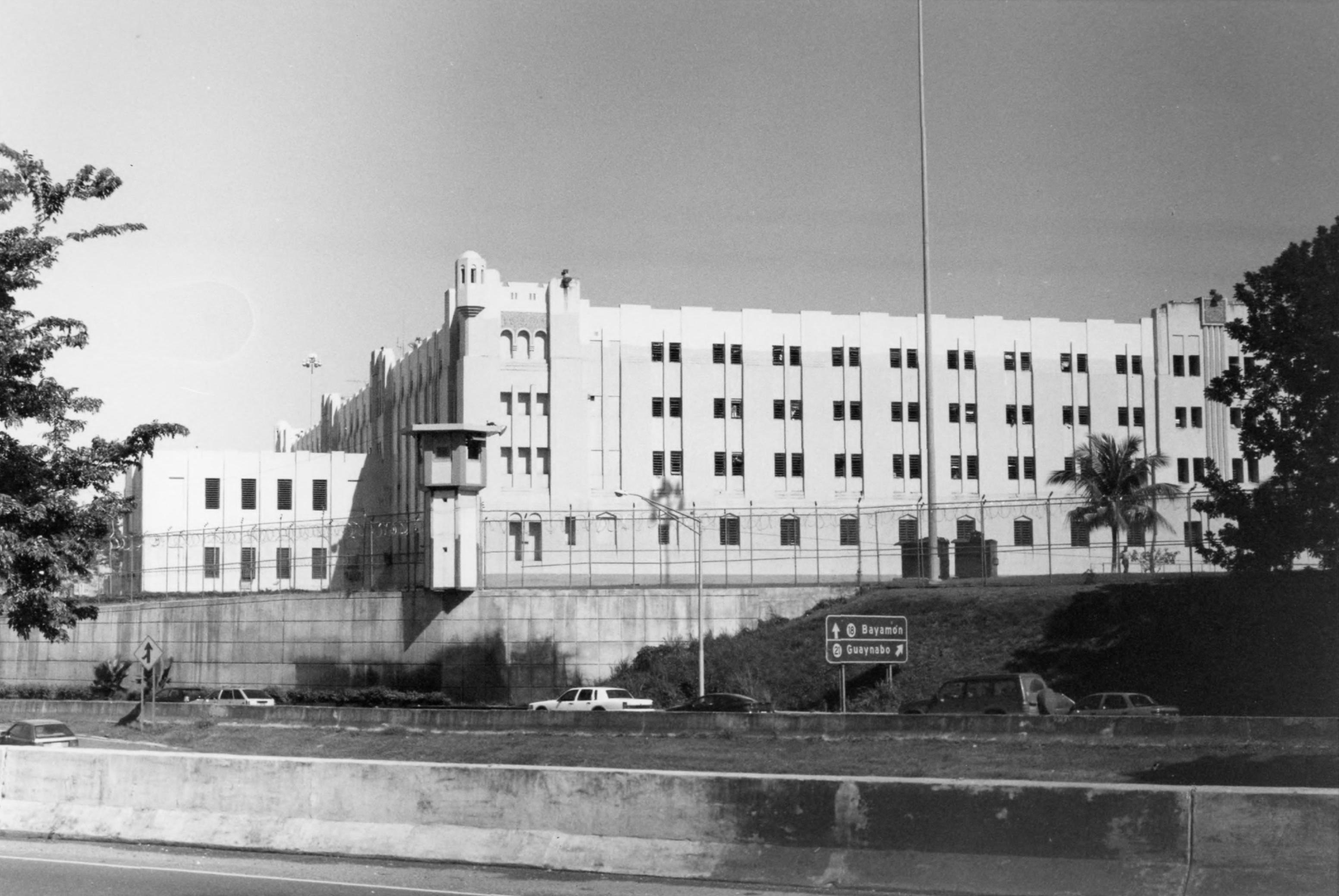

- Location within Puerto Rico
- Location: Monacillo Urbano, San Juan, Puerto Rico
- Coordinates: 18°23′19″N 66°4′15″W
- Built: 1933
- Architect: Roldan, Francisco; Higuera, Antonio
- Architectural style: Art Deco, Mission/Spanish Revival
- Demolished: 2015
- NRHP reference No.: 03000100
- Added to NRHP: March 07, 2003

The Río Piedras State Penitentiary, also known as Puerto Rico Island Penitentiary or Oso Blanco (or White Bear in English), was a correctional facility located in Río Piedras, San Juan, Puerto Rico (Now located in Monacillo Urbano, San Juan, Puerto Rico).

== History ==
The institution opened in 1933 under the government of James R. Beverley, and came to substitute the Puerto Rico Prison established by Spaniards in the 19th century.

On April 17, 1991, a spectacular escape occurred which involved landing a helicopter in the prison, and some inmates escaped. Authorities blamed the infamous Papo Cachete as the mastermind behind the escape.

In 2004, the Government of Puerto Rico ordered the eviction of the state prison because it was deemed too expensive to readjust the structure to newer and modern facility standards.

In 2014, the government ordered the demolition of the property to make room for a scientific park, "Ciudad de la Ciencias" of the Puerto Rico Science Technology and Research Trust. The College of Architects of Puerto Rico (CAAPPR) expressed their opposition to the demolition. The building was demolished in 2015.

== Building ==
In 1926, the Federal Government hired the architect, Francisco Roldán, to design the structure. In a new approach to rehabilitation policies, Roldán added a softer design in contrast to the harsh structures that used to be the prisons of the era.

The construction began officially in 1927 with the overview of a professional contracting agency and the use of prisoner workforce. The total cost of the project was $779,822. The prisoners were also used to cultivate the surrounding grounds in an effort to promote their contribution in the economy of the island.

The building bears a neo-moorish architectural style with touches of art deco accentuated by the main entrance to the complex. There, two female statues guard it from both sides, with a detailed arch that reads above a quote from the known Spanish feminist and sociologist Concepción Arenal that reads "Hate the crime and pity the criminal".

The complex featured 332 cells and 12 pavilions, a clinic, a psychiatric hall, a library, classrooms, workshops, a mess hall with capacity for 500 inmates, a kitchen and restrooms, all organized around an interior patio.

The structure also features guerites in the outer facade with bland-colored tiles to contrast its look with its austere appearance.

It was listed on the U.S. National Register of Historic Places in 2003.
