= Martín González, Carolina, Puerto Rico =

Barrio of Puerto Rico

Martín González
- Barrio
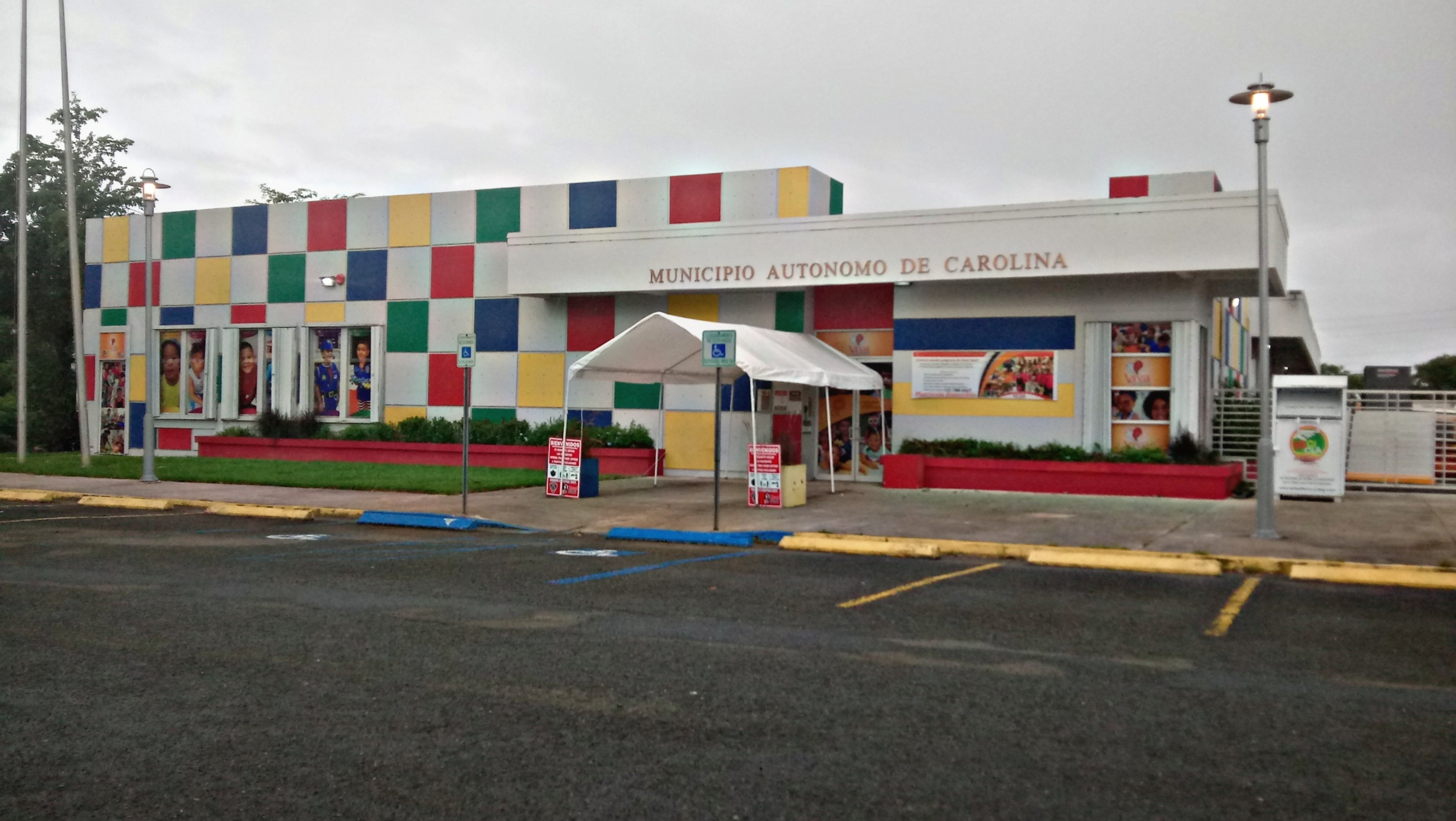
- Building in Martín González occupied by Head Start and Early Head Start in 2020

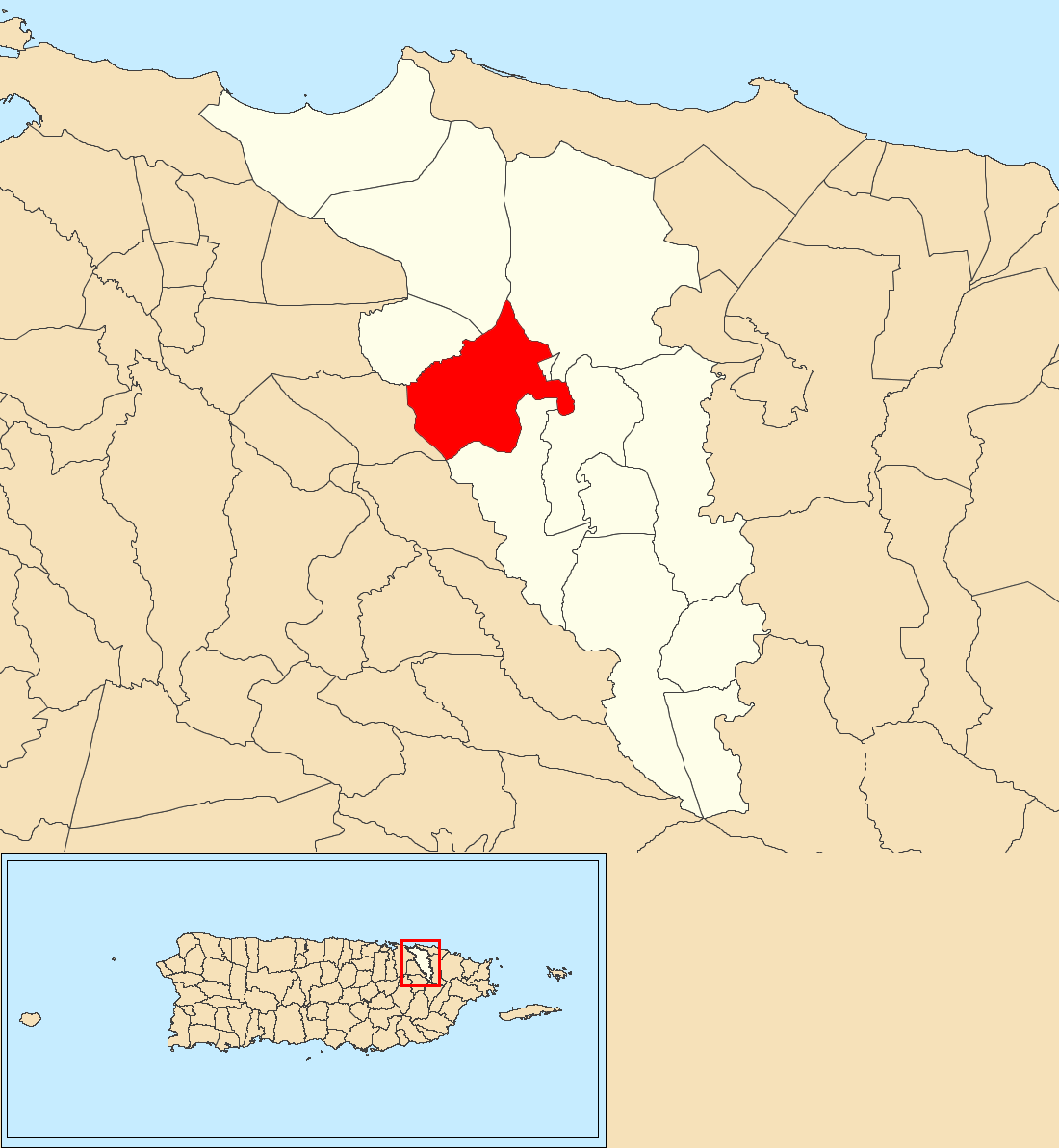
- Location of Martín González within the municipality of Carolina shown in red

- Location of Puerto Rico
- Coordinates: 18°22′34″N 65°58′22″W
- Commonwealth: Puerto Rico
- Municipality: Carolina

Area
  - Total: 3.64 sq mi (9.4 km^{2})
  - Land: 3.55 sq mi (9.2 km^{2})
  - Water: 0.09 sq mi (0.23 km^{2})
- Elevation: 85 ft (26 m)

Population (2010)
  - Total: 24,662
  - Density: 6,966.7/sq mi (2,689.9/km^{2})
- Source: 2010 Census
- Time zone: UTC−4 (AST)

Martín González is a barrio in the municipality of Carolina, Puerto Rico. Its population in 2010 was 24,662.

== History ==
Martín González was in Spain's gazetteers until Puerto Rico was ceded by Spain in the aftermath of the Spanish–American War under the terms of the Treaty of Paris of 1898 and became an unincorporated territory of the United States. In 1899, the United States Department of War conducted a census of Puerto Rico finding that the population of Martín González barrio was 708.

Historical population
Census	Pop.	Note	%±
1900	708		—
1910	813		14.8%
1920	770		−5.3%
1930	1,169		51.8%
1940	1,906		63.0%
1950	3,232		69.6%
1960	4,903		51.7%
1970	0		−100.0%
1980	19,514		—
1990	24,175		23.9%
2000	24,656		2.0%
2010	24,662		0.0%
U.S. Decennial Census; 1899 (shown as 1900) 1910-1930; 1930-1950 1980-2000 2010

== See also ==
- List of communities in Puerto Rico
- 2023 Carolina, Puerto Rico, massacre
