= Operation Guard Shack =

FBI investigation into law enforcement corruption in Puerto Rico

Operation Guard Shack was a two-year Federal Bureau of Investigation (FBI) investigation into corruption within the law enforcement of Puerto Rico. The operation came to a conclusion on 6 October 2010, with a series of pre-dawn raids that led to over 130 arrests of members of the Puerto Rico Police Department and the Puerto Rico Department of Corrections and Rehabilitation as well as other individuals.

The operation began at 3 a.m., when 65 tactical teams, including SWAT and the Hostage Rescue Team (HRT), fanned out across the island in a series of sneak attack arrests. On hand were a range of FBI personnel—crisis negotiators, evidence response team members, canines and their handlers, and 80 medical personnel from first responders and nurses to a trauma surgeon and a veterinarian.

The central thread of the corruption was law enforcement officers providing protection and other services to drug traffickers. Over 1,000 agents of the FBI conducted the raids. Many of them were flown in secretly. The agency characterized the action as, "likely the largest police corruption case in the FBI’s history."

Indictments announced on 6 October included:

1. 61 officers from the Puerto Rico Police Department
2. 16 officers from various municipal police departments
3. 12 officers from the Puerto Rico Department of Corrections
4. 44 others associated with agencies including the US Army, Puerto Rico National Guard, and the Social Security Administration

The accused officers faced a maximum sentence of 15 years in prison.

== See also ==
- Operation Lost Honor
