= Tomás de Jesús Mangual =

Puerto Rican investigative reporter

- Born: 5 October 1944; Ponce, Puerto Rico
- Died: 31 October 2011 (aged 67); Mayagüez, Puerto Rico
- Occupation: Journalist
- Notable credit: Investigative reporter (El Vocero)

Tomás de Jesús Mangual (5 October 1944 – 31 October 2011) was a Puerto Rican investigative reporter who worked for El Vocero, a well-known newspaper in Puerto Rico.

== Career ==
Mangual served in the United States Army during the Vietnam War era. Joined El Vocero, a well-known Puerto Rican newspaper, during the 1970s. While he was not the only reporter covering crime stories for El Vocero, his name was the most recognizable. His trademark was the usage of Puerto Rican slang terms, such as Corrió como alma que lleva al Diablo (The person ran like a soul possessed by the Devil). Another one of his stories began with "A well-aimed stab to the heart..." His writing style earned him awards, but also criticism.

== Criminal libel laws of Puerto Rico lawsuit ==
For many years, Mangual investigated crimes committed by politicians and police officers and was told he would be sued for libel by those he was investigating. In response, in 2003 Mangual became party to a lawsuit that said Puerto Rico's criminal libel laws were against Freedom of the Press. The lawsuit resulted in the criminal libel laws of Puerto Rico being struck down for being unconstitutional. This was on the grounds that the court ruled that the law failed to protect freedom of the press on three grounds. They were that actual malice needs to be proved in libel cases, the law did not allow for the truth to be a valid defence and that the law's requirement that reporting be "fair" as well as accurate was too restrictive under the First Amendment.

Mangual died on 31 October 2011 at the age of 67 at an elderly home in Mayaguez and was interred at the Las Mercedes Cemetery in Ponce, Puerto Rico.

== See also ==
- List of Puerto Ricans
