= Edsel Torres Gómez =

Puerto Rican criminal

Edsel Torres Gomez
- Born: 1962 (approx.); Caguas, Puerto Rico
- Other name: "Negri"
- Occupation: drug dealer
- Known for: Puerto Rico's most-wanted man
- Height: 1.68 m (5 ft 6 in)
- Criminal charges: murder, kidnapping
- Capture status: captured
- Wanted by: The FBI, the Puerto Rican police
- Wanted since: 1994
- Escaped: 1994
- Escape end: 1998

Edsel Torres Gomez a.k.a. "Negri" (born c. 1962) is a Puerto Rican alleged former drug dealer who was on the FBI most wanted list for four years and is now serving prison time in Mississippi.

== Criminal career ==
Torres Gomez was born in Caguas and resided at the public housing complex known as "Residencial Jose Gautier Benitez."

He was on the FBI most wanted list for four years and was also the most wanted Puerto Rican fugitive. He allegedly was the mastermind of the Cayey Massacre, in which four men were kidnapped and murdered over stolen drugs valued at about $7 million dollars (in 1994 money). One of the men, Angel Castro-Alifonso, was the main intended kidnap victim, while three other men were innocent bystanders and were showing Castro-Alifonso realty property when he was shot and they were taken.

Torres Gomez was a fugitive for four years, from 1994 to 1998, when he was captured in San Juan on April 8 of that year, by the U.S. Marshals fugitive task force. His trial was given massive coverage by Puerto Rican media, especially by El Vocero newspaper.

On April 21, 1998, the Grand Jury for the District of Puerto Rico charged Torres Gomez with 21 violations of the U.S.C. codes 841, 846 and 848. The United States sought the death penalty against Torres Gomez; Torres Gomez and his attorneys fought against it. As of 2023, Edsel Torres Gomez was incarcerated at Federal Correctional Institution in Yazoo City, Mississippi. He was scheduled to be released in 2024. His federal Inmate register Number is: 16156-069.

== See also ==
- List of Puerto Ricans
- Alex Trujillo
- Wes Solano
- Papo Cachete
- Jaime Dávila Reyes
