= Puerto Rico Department of Corrections and Rehabilitation =

Government agency of Puerto Rico

- Departamento de Corrección y Rehabilitación de Puerto Rico
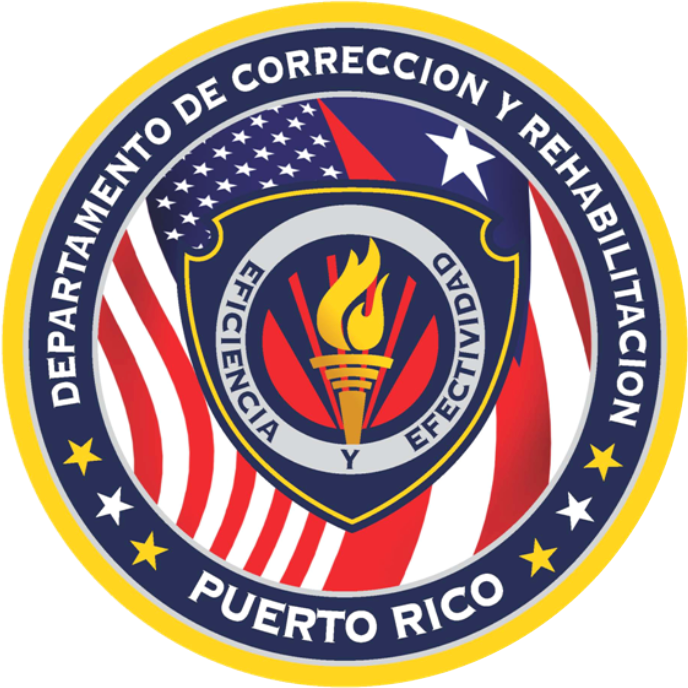

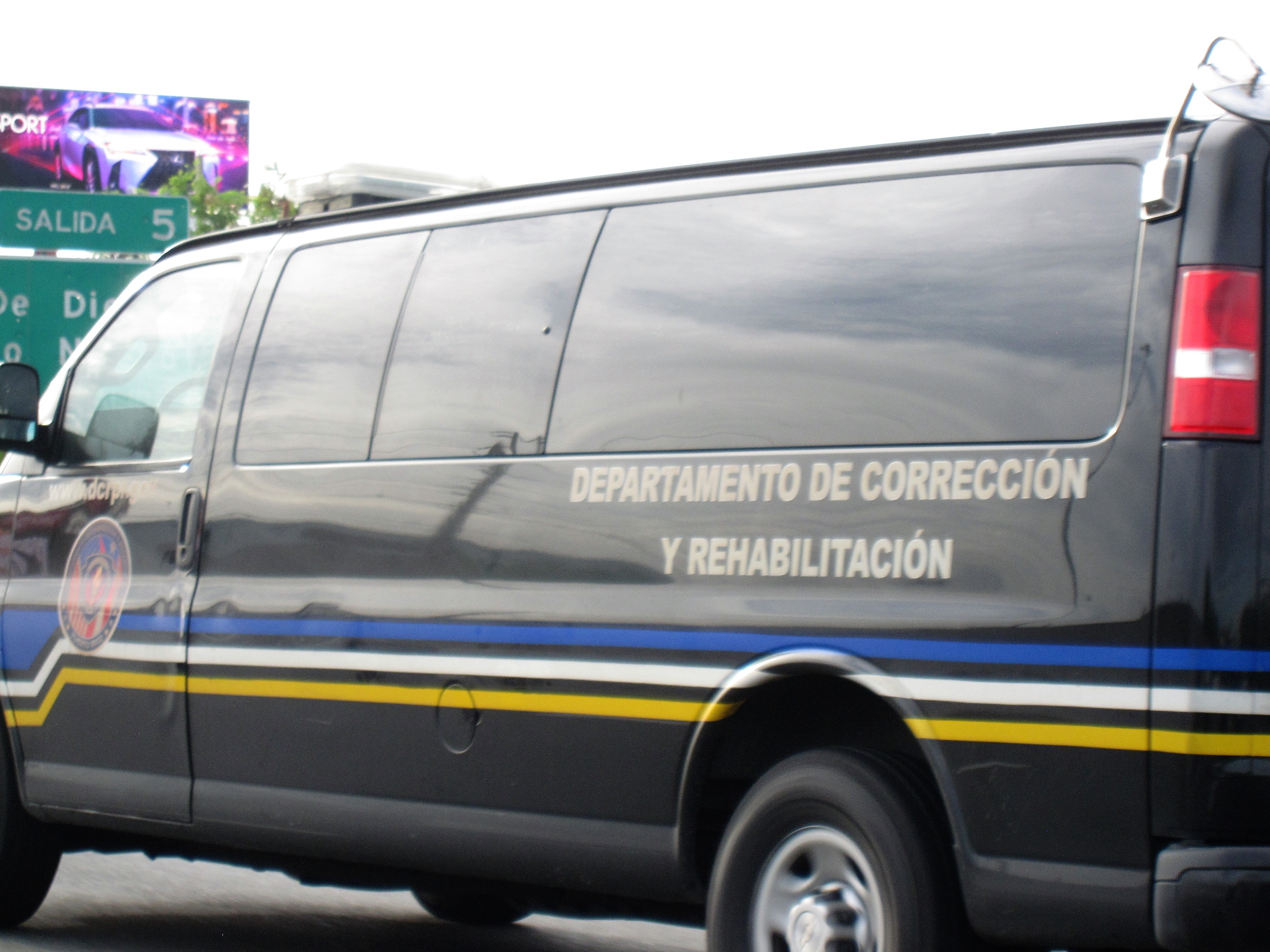
- Puerto Rico Department of Corrections and Rehabilitation vehicle on highway

Department overview
- Formed: December 9, 1993; 32 years ago
- Jurisdiction: executive branch
- Headquarters: San Juan, PR
- Motto: Security, Rehabilitation
- Employees: 6,647
- Department executive: Francisco Quiñones Rivera, Secretary
- Key documents: Article VI of the Constitution of Puerto Rico; Reorganization Plan No. 3 of 1993
- Website: dcr.pr.gov

The Puerto Rico Department of Correction and Rehabilitation (Spanish: Departamento de Corrección y Rehabilitación de Puerto Rico) is the law enforcement executive department of the government responsible for structuring, developing, and coordinating the public policies in Puerto Rico, an unincorporated territory of the U.S. The department has authority over its correctional system and the rehabilitation of its adult and young population who have broken the law.

== History ==
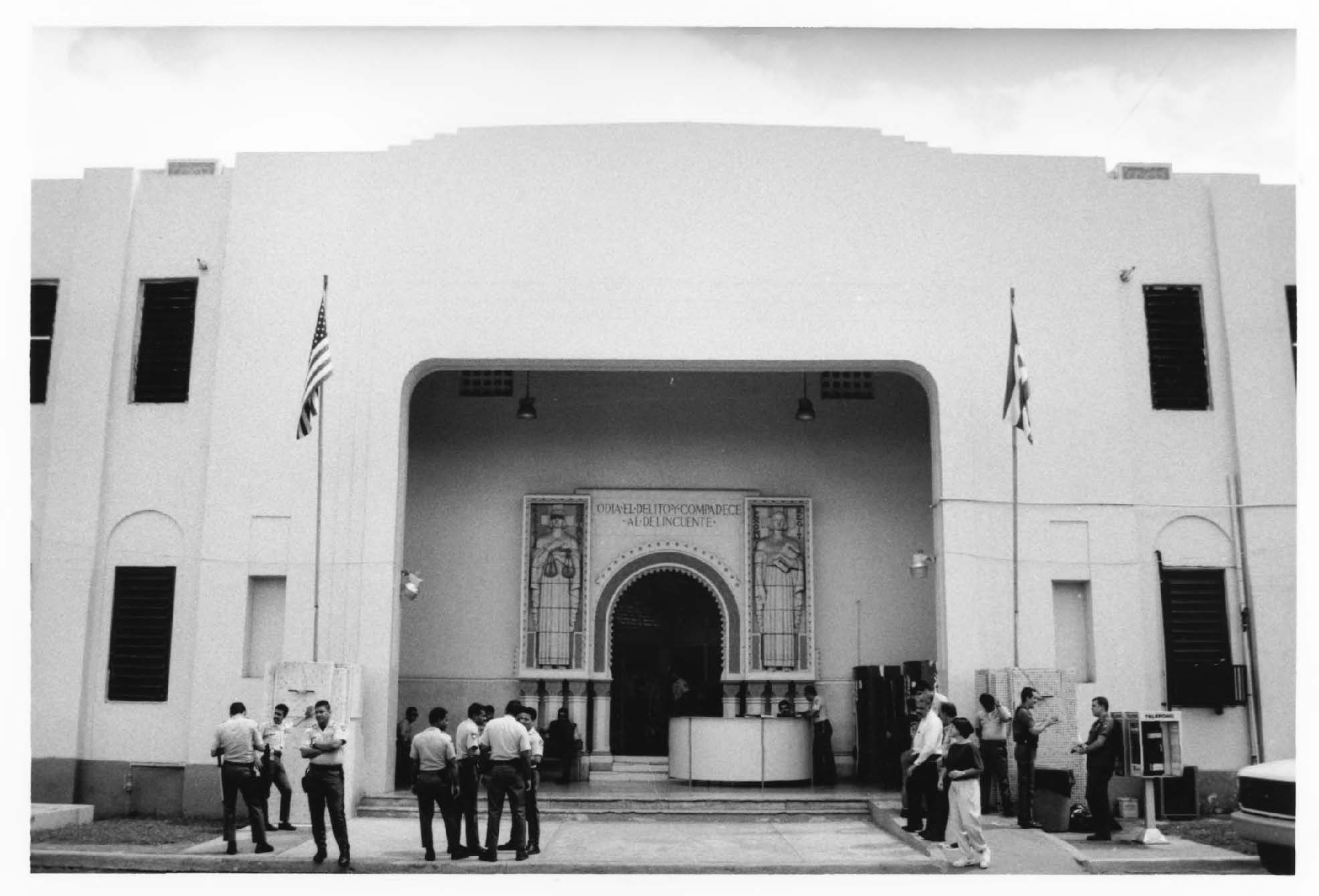
Río Piedras State Penitentiary (Oso Blanco), built 1933, closed 2004

In August 2015, the department was one of eight identified by the Department of Justice as "high-risk" recipients of federal money, based on audits showing "irregular spending and lax internal controls".

In January 2016, $10 million of delayed payments to the department's vendor, Trinity Services Group, threatened to interrupt the food supply to all of its 12,500 inmates.

In 2018 the department under secretary planned to transfer as many as 1,200 inmates outside the island with the intention of transferring 30% of all inmates. The program intended to save millions and close six prisons. The program received criticism from families of inmates concerned about keeping in contact with their relatives and the negative effects the plan could have on rehabilitating inmates. The program remained on hold a year later due to lack of funds and contract issues for the transfers.

In February 2021 the Juvenile Institutions Administrations reported an increase in mental health incidents among juvenile inmates.

== Secretary ==
The Secretary of Corrections and Rehabilitation (Spanish: Secretario de Corrección y Rehabilitación) is the appointed official responsible for setting the public policy of Puerto Rico for its corrections, rehabilitation and parole systems.

In 2021 Ana I. Escobar Pabón was confirmed as secretary of the department.

== Agencies ==
- Corrections Administration
- Juvenile Institutions Administration (Negociado de Instituciones Juveniles NIJ)
- Labor and Training Enterprises Corporation
- Office of Pretrial Services
- Parole Board

== Prisons ==
There are no private prisons in Puerto Rico.

In March 1993 the government made a three-year agreement with city officials in Appleton, Minnesota to fill all 516 beds of their Prairie Correctional Facility with Puerto Rican inmates. The prison had been built by the city and was sitting empty.

In March 2012, Puerto Rico contracted with Corrections Corporation of America to send as many as 480 inmates to CCA's Cimarron Correctional Facility near Cushing, Oklahoma. The three-year contract was brought to a premature close in June 2013 after unit-wide fights and "disruptive events", with the inmates sent home.

=== Current ===
Following is a list of Puerto Rico's 33 state prisons. This list does not include federal prisons (such as the Metropolitan Detention Center, Guaynabo) or jails of other jurisdictions.

- Institución Correccional Guerrero, Aguadilla, stated capacity 1000
- Centro de Detención del Oeste, Mayagüez, Puerto Rico, capacity 546
- Anexo Sabana Hoyos 384, Arecibo, Puerto Rico, capacity 384
- Centro de Tratamiento Residencial, Arecibo, capacity 75
- Institución Correccional Sabana Hoyos 728, Arecibo, capacity 728
- Institución Correccional Sabana Hoyos 216, Arecibo, capacity 216
- Programa Agrícola de la Montaña-La Pica, Jayuya, capacity 50
- Anexo Custodia Mínima, Ponce, capacity 192
- Centro de Clasificacion Fase III, Ponce, capacity 280
- Centro de Ingresos del Sur Ponce 676, Ponce, capacity 676
- Institución Adults Ponce 1000, Ponce, capacity 831
- Institución Correccional Juvenes Adultes, Ponce, capacity 304
- Facilidad Medica Correccional, Ponce, capacity 486
- Institución Máxima Seguridad, Ponce, capacity 420
- Institución Correccional Ponce Juvenes Adultes 224, Ponce, capacity 224
- Institución Correccional Ponce Principal, Ponce, capacity 534
- Vivienda alterna Anexo 246, Ponce, capacity 246
- Modular Detention Unit (MDU), Ponce, capacity 224
- Centro con Libertad Para Trabajar, Ponce, capacity 112
- Escuela Industrial para Mujeres Vega Alta, Vega Alta, capacity 471
- Anexo Seguridad Máxima, Bayamón, capacity 292
- Institución Correccional Bayamón 308/488, Bayamón, capacity 563
- Centro de Ingresos Metropolitano, Bayamón, capacity 705
- Institución Correccional Bayamón 501, Bayamón, capacity 516
- Centro Detencion Bayamón 1072, Bayamón, capacity 1428
- Hogar Intermedio para Mujeres, San Juan, capacity 38
- Campamento Zarzal Dirección, Río Grande, capacity 500
- Institución Correccional Zarzal, Río Grande, capacity 450
- Anexo Guayama 296, Guayama, capacity 296
- Institución Correccional Guayama 945, Guayama, capacity 320
- Institución Correccional Guayama 500, Guayama, capacity 516
- Institución Correccional Guayama Máxima Seguridad 1000, Guayama, capacity 529

The main women's prison, Escuela Industrial para Mujeres Vega Alta, opened in 1954, replacing a prison in Areceibo. Work began on the facility in 1952. Puerto Rico also operates the Hogar de Adaptación Social en Vega Alta, which opened in 1987, and the Hogar Intermedio para Mujeres in Río Piedras, which opened in 1996.

=== Former ===
Puerto Rico's former prison facilities include:

- Río Piedras State Penitentiary (opened 1933, closed 2004, demolished 2015)
- Hogar de Adaptación Social, Fajardo
