= Jose Garcia Cosme =

Puerto Rican criminal (1957–2019)

José García Cosme
- Born: José A. García Cosme; 1957; Caguas, Puerto Rico
- Died: September 2, 2019 (aged 61 or 62); Gurabo, Puerto Rico
- Other name: Papo Cachete
- Occupation: Drug dealer

José A. García Cosme (1957–September 2, 2019), better known as Papo Cachete, was a Puerto Rican convicted drug dealer. He was one of the leaders of the illegal drug trade in Caguas, Puerto Rico from the late 1970s to the late 1980s.

== Biography ==
García Cosme was the leader of a drug trafficking organization in Caguas and is considered to be the precursor of the era of the 90s in drug dealing in the area, the person who led to the rise of other well known Puerto Rican alleged drug dealers from Caguas such as Edsel Torres Gomez, as well as Miguel Rivera Newton ("Cano Newton"), Jaime Dávila Reyes, ("Peluche"), Cano Navarro, ("Gordo Fen"/"Jumbo") and others.

Authorities believe that García Cosme was the mastermind behind an escape that occurred on April 17, 1991, at the Oso Blanco prison in San Juan, where a helicopter landed inside the prison, allowing some prisoners to escape.

García Cosme had a long criminal history dating back to the 1980s. He was arrested during 2013, convicted of drug dealing and sent to a federal prison in the United States.

Garcia Cosme said the Puerto Rican government bore some responsibility for the drug problems Puerto Rico has faced.

His sister, Luz García Cosme, was arrested during 2015 at the Residencial Bonneville Heights apartment complex.

== Death ==
Garcia Cosme was released during 2019 and was beginning to live out a sentence of eight years in supervised liberty when he was assassinated on September 2, 2019, as he was driving towards an exit to Caguas in the nearby city of Gurabo. The assailant or assailants fired multiple shots at the compact car, a Suzuki SX-4, that García Cosme was driving. Four hours after his death, his accountant, 35-year-old Javier Vazquez García (no relation), was also murdered of multiple shots at Vazquez García's home in Carolina, Puerto Rico.

== See also ==
- List of Puerto Ricans
- Rafy Dones
