= Jaime Dávila Reyes =

Puerto Rican alleged drug dealer (born 1990)

Jaime Dávila Reyes (born in 1980), a.k.a. "peluche" ("teddy bear") is a Puerto Rican alleged former drug dealer and capo. According to reports, he controlled the sales of narcotics at places like Naguabo and Caguas, specifically, Barriada Morales and the Jose Gautier Bentez housing complex in the latter city's case.

== Early life ==
According to some reports, Dávila Reyes is the son of the infamous Sonia Reyes Camarena, a.k.a. "Sonia la Pata" ("Sonia the Lesbian"), who was suspected of being the leader of a drug dealing organization.

== Career ==
Davila Reyes began in drug trafficking in the mid-90s, with the help of his stepfather, Miguel Rivera Newton a.k.a. "Cano Newton", who was the right hand man of drug trafficker Edsel Torres Gomez a.k.a. "Negri" who controlled the Caguas area from 1992 until his arrest in 1998. During this time, Davila Reyes played the role of contract killer

Dávila Reyes featured as the most wanted fugitive in the list of top ten fugitives by both the Caguas and the Ponce police departments. He was also on the Federal Bureau of Investigation's list of most wanted fugitives.

According to the F.B.I., Dávila Reyes was the leader of a gang or cartel, which operated since 2005 and sold narcotics from Caguas to other drug dealers at the Ignacio Morales Dávila housing project in Naguabo, who (the Naguabo dealers) would then re-sell the drugs.

During Dávila's leadership, a turf war between his organization and that led by another Caguas man, Carlos Ruben Morales Dávila (no relation), a.k.a. "Cano Navarro", broke out, This war claimed the lives of many members of both organizations. "Cano Navarro" was arrested in 2011.

Dávila Reyes' organization, reports indicate, distributed cocaine, heroin and marihuana.

== Arrest ==
He was arrested on 30 June 2015 at a house located at Urbanizacion Santa Monica, in Bayamon. On 2 July of the same year, he was driven to the FBI's Puerto Rico headquarters and was booked there.

Dávila Reyes was given four different criminal charges; he declared himself guilty of one of those.

== Sentence ==
He was sentenced to 21 years in jail by judge Aida Delgado Colón.

== Brother's arrest ==
His brother, Jason Dávila Reyes, was arrested in 2011 and sentenced to seven years in jail for various charges.

== See also ==
- Edsel Torres Gomez - another Caguas and Jose Gautier Benitez alleged former drug dealer
- Papo Cachete - another Caguas alleged former drug dealer
- List of Puerto Ricans
