= El Vocero =

Puerto Rican newspaper

- La Verdad No Tiene Precio
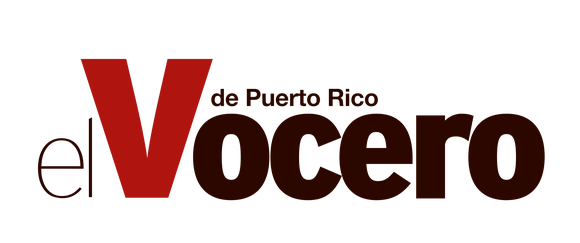
- Type: Daily newspaper
- Format: Tabloid
- Owner(s): Publi-Inversiones
- President: Salvador Hasbún
- Founded: 1974 (reestablished 2014)
- Political alignment: Conservative
- Language: Spanish
- Headquarters: 1064 Ponce de León Avenue, San Juan, Puerto Rico 00901
- Website: www.elvocero.com

El Vocero de Puerto Rico is a Puerto Rican free newspaper that is published in San Juan. Published since 1974, El Vocero was at first the third of the four largest Puerto Rico newspapers, trailing El Mundo and El Nuevo Día and leading El Reportero and The San Juan Star in sales. With the temporary demise in the late 1980s of El Mundo, El Vocero became even more popular, becoming the island's largest newspaper by 1994. From 1985 to 2013 it was owned by Caribbean International News Corp. The owners of Caribbean International News Corp, and therefore owners of El Vocero, were Elliot Stein, I. Martin Pompadur and The Henry Crown Co.

In the beginning, El Vocero was known as a sensationalist tabloid that dramatized all the violent news, including graphic cover photos of murders. Writers included Tomas De Jesus Mangual, Julio Víctor Ramírez Torres, José A. Purcell, Miguel Rivera Puig, Maggie Bobb and others. However, in the early 2000s, the newspaper changed its direction, becoming a mainstream newspaper, adding a much broader coverage of entertainment as well as business related news, and carrying more political news, as in the situation in Vieques.

In addition to its regular news section, El Vocero also has business, entertainment, sports, and travel sections.

On April 8, 2007, Gaspar Roca, the paper's founding publisher and editor in chief, died due to a respiratory arrest. He was replaced by his son Miguel Roca. As of January 2011, Miguel Roca was no longer working at the newspaper, and was replaced by a San Juan-based construction lawyer named Peter Miller. Due to financial difficulties, in December 2013 El Vocero went bankrupt (Chapter 7). The new owner and publisher is Publi-Inversiones, formed by a group of local entrepreneurs.

== First free newspaper ==
On July 31, 2012, El Vocero changed its format, becoming the first free daily circulation newspaper in Puerto Rico. Later on other free daily newspapers were introduced, including the Swedish-owned Metro newspaper as well as the GFR Media-owned Indice. Vocero was well received by its readers, and its circulation grew.

As soon as Vocero went free, a newspaper war ensued. First, the San Juan Star, which is distributed by Vocero’s competitors, GFR Media, accused Vocero of being financed by the government. At the same time, another GFR Media paper, Primera Hora, launched a media campaign squarely directed at Vocero, titled “El Que No Tiene La Voz del Pueblo No Vale Na’”. A couple of months later, however, GFR Media launched its own free paper, Indice. In October 2012, GFR's flagship newspaper, El Nuevo Dia, published an investigation in which it claimed that El Vocero was financed by the government. At the same time, El Vocero published its own series of articles demonstrating how the Ferre family had used the government to obtain financing for its own enterprises.

== Controversial financing by the government ==
The newspaper has been characterized as propaganda for the New Progressive Party since El Vocero allegedly received funds from the 2009 to 2013 NPP-controlled central government. According to an investigation by El Vocero's main competitor, the newspaper El Nuevo Día, the company has received more than $24.9 million, even when it had a debt of $21,141,200 in taxes. El Vocero's editor-in-chief responded by stating that neither the newspaper nor its parent company have received government funds through any means, and dismissed El Nuevo Día's allegations as part of a series of attacks driven by the newspaper's new-found success as a free publication.

== Ownership change ==
In 2013, a group of businessmen from Puerto Rico acquired the rights to the name of the publication EL VOCERO and took it upon themselves to keep the publication alive. On the first of December of that same year, the newspaper was re-launched with a new editorial philosophy and a new design. The daily newspaper EL VOCERO was originally founded in 1974 and, due to it being part of a foreign investment fund, was managed under a different structure.

It is published in San Juan, Monday through Friday, and it is distributed completely free across 4,500 establishments and 100 traffic light intersections in the 78 municipalities. Apart from the printed version being available five days a week, there is a digital daily newspaper published every day, including Saturdays and Sundays.

According to Gaither International, a market research firm, and its MBP analysis of 18+ readership, EL VOCERO is the most read newspaper in Puerto Rico, Mondays through Fridays. EL VOCERO of Puerto Rico has maintained its domain in the news industry by being the newspaper with the biggest circulation on the island, with more than 154 thousand printed copies audited by the Certified Audit Circulation (CAC). On Thursdays, the number of copies increases to 215 thousand. In addition to the printed copies, there are 100,000 digital subscribers who receive the newspaper through their email every morning.

Since 2013, EL VOCERO and its employees have been managed by Publi-Inversiones Puerto Rico, Inc. Under the direction of experienced managers, EL VOCERO has solidified its honest and responsible editorial policy, and it has strengthened its compromise with the well-being of Puerto Rican families. Through its journalistic investigations that have uncovered improper actions and schemes of fraud, the publication is characterized by its role as an oversight body of the Government and public finances. Its investigation of the “Petroleum Cartel," for example, revealed how members of The Puerto Rico Electric Power Authority had been taking advantage of the fuel business and enriching themselves through commissions and bribes for over a decade.

The newspaper is staffed with a robust team of journalists experts in politics, law and order, government, economics, sports, entertainment, gastronomy, travel and more, making EL VOCERO a publication with complete and objective coverage of the news on the island.

It is available to readers for free through its printed copy and digital replica, its webpage elvocero.com, its mobile app, and its social media pages. Aside from the daily newspaper, the publication also produces three magazines. Zona, which is marketed for men, and Mírame Siempre, which covers social events, fashion, and philanthropy, are sold monthly at a cost of $2.50. Bienestar Total, dedicated to health and lifestyle, is distributed for free on a quarterly basis in medical offices, hospitals, gymnasiums, and in other points of interests.

El VOCERO's central offices are located on 1064, Avenida Ponce de León, San Juan, Puerto Rico.
