= Trichocereus =

Former genus of cacti

Trichocereus is a formerly recognized genus of cacti native to South America (Bolivia, northern Chile, Ecuador and Peru). As of November 2025, it was considered by Plants of the World Online to be a synonym of the genus Echinopsis.

== Species ==
Species previously placed in the genus Trichocereus include:

- Trichocereus macrogonus (Salm-Dyck) Riccob. → Echinopsis macrogona
- Trichocereus spinibarbis (Otto ex Pfeiff.) F.Ritter → Echinopsis spinibarbis
- Trichocereus uyupampensis Backeb. → Echinopsis uyupampensis
