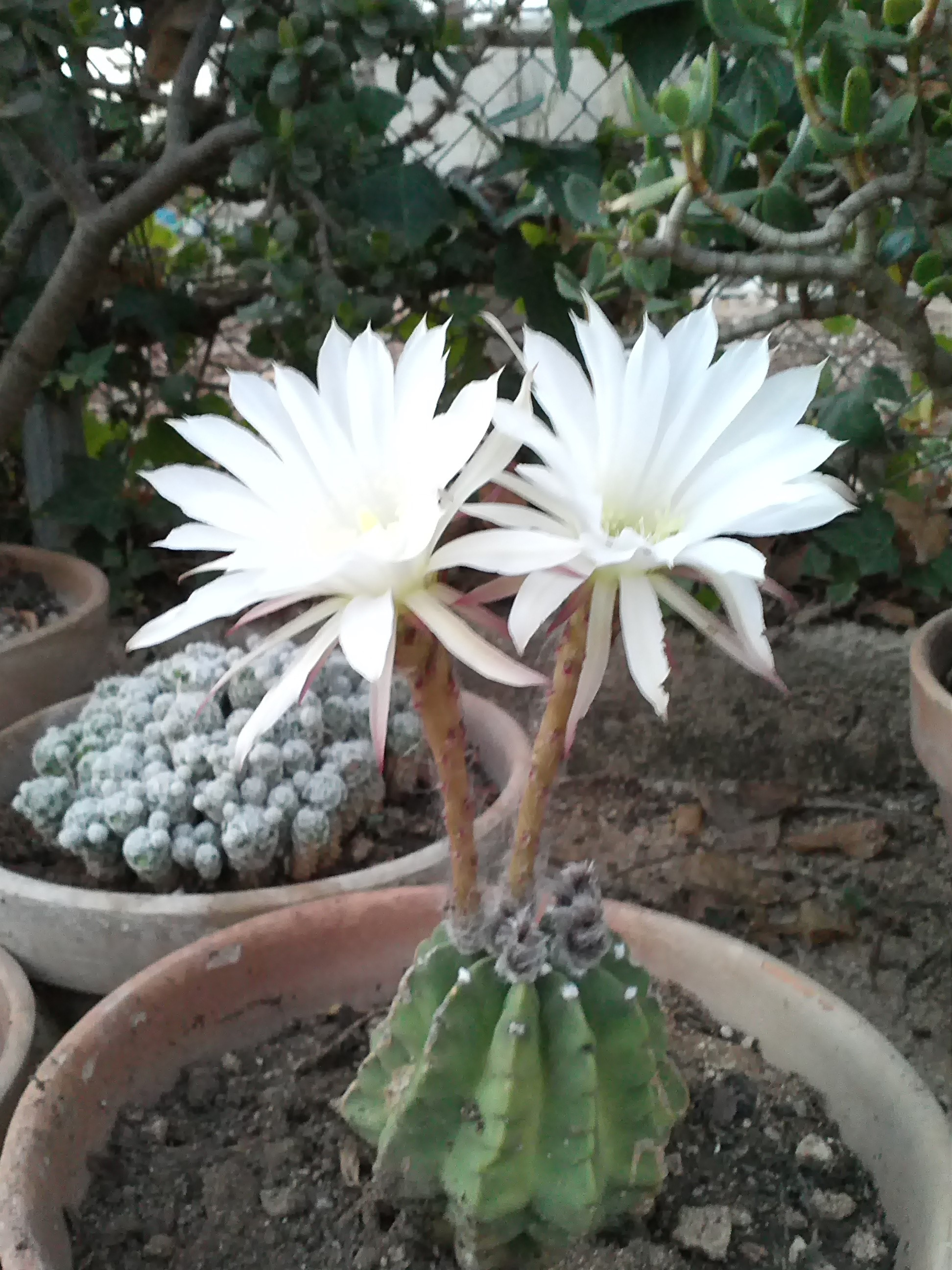

Conservation status
- Least Concern (IUCN 3.1)

Scientific classification
- Kingdom: Plantae
- Clade: Tracheophytes
- Clade: Angiosperms
- Clade: Eudicots
- Order: Caryophyllales
- Family: Cactaceae
- Subfamily: Cactoideae
- Genus: Echinopsis
- Species: E. calochlora

Binomial name
- Echinopsis calochlora K.Schum.

Synonyms
- Lobivia calochlora (K.Schum.) Schlumpb. 2012; Echinopsis calochlora var. claviformis Rud.Mey. 1920; Echinopsis calochlora subsp. glaetzleana P.J.Braun & Esteves 1994; Echinopsis grandiflora Linke 1857; Echinopsis hammerschmidii Cárdenas 1956

= Echinopsis calochlora =

Species of cactus

Echinopsis calochlora, is a species of Echinopsis cactus found in Bolivia.

== Description ==
Echinopsis calochlora grows singly or in groups. The spherical to short cylindrical, dark green shoots reach heights of growth of 6 to 10 cm (2.4 to 3.9 in) with a diameter of 7 to 9 cm (2.8 to 3.5 in). The shoot apex is slightly depressed. There are about 15 sharp-edged ribs up to 1.5 cm (0.59 in) high that are notched. The circular, gray areoles located on them are up to 1 cm (0.39 in) apart. Dark grey, needle-like spines emerge from them, which are thickened at their base. The single, horizontally protruding central spine is 1.5 to 2 cm (0.59 to 0.79 in) long. The eight to nine slightly unequal radial spines have a length of 0.6 to 1.2 cm (0.24 to 0.47 in).

The narrow, funnel-shaped, long tubular, white flowers open at night. They are up to 18 cm (7.1 in) long and have a diameter of 7 cm (2.8 in). The spherical to ellipsoidal, dark green fruits tear open.

== Distribution ==
Echinopsis calochlora is distributed in the Bolivian department of Santa Cruz in the lowlands around 600 meters.

== Taxonomy ==
The first description by Martín Cárdenas was published in 1956.
