= Echinopsis pereziensis =

Scientific classification
- Kingdom: Plantae
- Clade: Tracheophytes
- Clade: Angiosperms
- Clade: Eudicots
- Order: Caryophyllales
- Family: Cactaceae
- Subfamily: Cactoideae
- Genus: Echinopsis
- Species: E. pereziensis

Binomial name
- Echinopsis pereziensis Cárdenas

Synonyms
- Lobivia pereziensis (Cárdenas) Lodé

Species of cactus

Echinopsis pereziensis, synonym Lobivia pereziensis, is a species of flowering plant in the cactus family Cactaceae, native to Bolivia. It was first described by Martin Cárdenas in 1963.
