= Echinopsis sucrensis =

Scientific classification
- Kingdom: Plantae
- Clade: Tracheophytes
- Clade: Angiosperms
- Clade: Eudicots
- Order: Caryophyllales
- Family: Cactaceae
- Subfamily: Cactoideae
- Genus: Echinopsis
- Species: E. sucrensis

Binomial name
- Echinopsis sucrensis Cárdenas

Synonyms
- Lobivia sucrensis (Cárdenas) Lodé

Species of cactus

Echinopsis sucrensis, synonym Lobivia sucrensis, is a species of flowering plant in the cactus family Cactaceae, native to Bolivia. It was first described by Martin Cárdenas in 1963. It was transferred to Lobivia in Cárdenas, but as of November 2024, Plants of the World Online accepted the earlier placement in Echinopsis.
