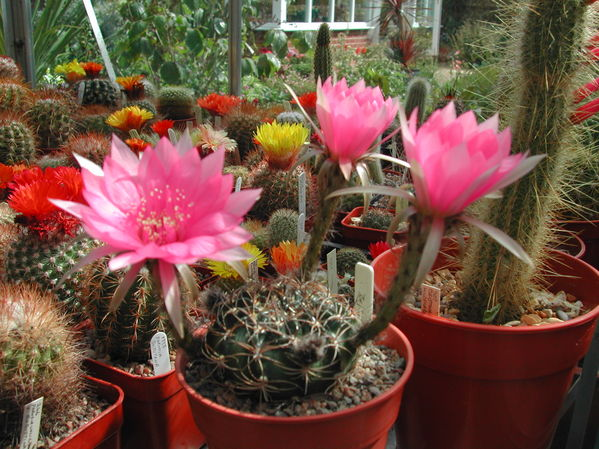

Scientific classification
- Kingdom: Plantae
- Clade: Tracheophytes
- Clade: Angiosperms
- Clade: Eudicots
- Order: Caryophyllales
- Family: Cactaceae
- Subfamily: Cactoideae
- Genus: Echinopsis
- Species: E. cardenasiana

Binomial name
- Echinopsis cardenasiana (Rausch) Friedrich

Synonyms
- Echinopsis ancistrophora subsp. cardenasiana (Rausch) Rausch; Lobivia cardenasiana Rausch Rausch

= Echinopsis cardenasiana =

Species of cactus

Echinopsis cardenasiana, synonym Lobivia cardenasiana, is a species of Echinopsis found in Bolivia.

== Distribution ==
Lobivia cardenasiana is distributed in the Bolivian departments of Tarija at altitudes of 2250 to 3150 meters.
