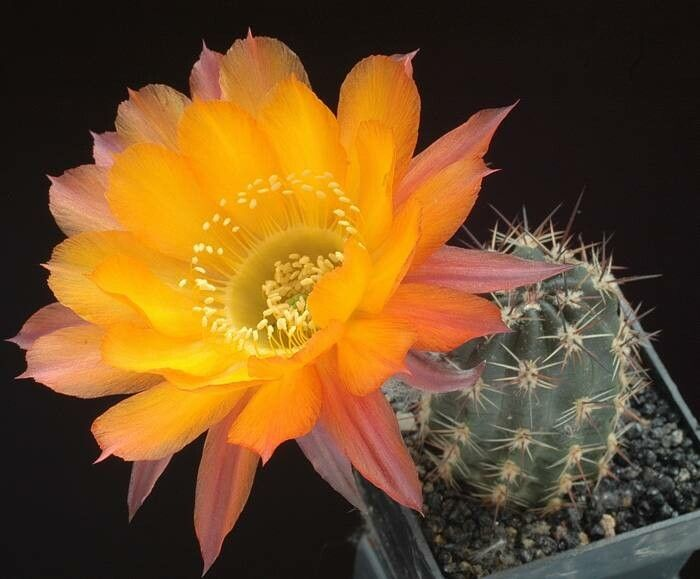

Conservation status
- Least Concern (IUCN 3.1)

Scientific classification
- Kingdom: Plantae
- Clade: Tracheophytes
- Clade: Angiosperms
- Clade: Eudicots
- Order: Caryophyllales
- Family: Cactaceae
- Subfamily: Cactoideae
- Genus: Echinopsis
- Species: E. haematantha

Binomial name
- Echinopsis haematantha (Speg.) D.R. Hunt

Synonyms
- List: Echinocactus haematanthus Speg. 1905; Lobivia haematantha (Speg.) Britton & Rose 1922; Echinocactus cachensis (Speg.) Speg. 1905; Echinopsis albispina Roth 1903; Echinopsis amblayensis (Rausch) Friedrich 1974; Echinopsis amblayensis var. albispina (Rausch) Friedrich 1974; Echinopsis cachensis Speg. 1905; Echinopsis densispina var. amblayensis (Rausch) J.G.Lamb. 1998; Echinopsis elongata (Backeb.) Friedrich 1974; Echinopsis haematantha var. chorrillosensis (Rausch) J.G.Lamb. 1998; Echinopsis haematantha var. elongata (Backeb.) 1998; Echinopsis haematantha var. hualfinensis (Rausch) 1998; Echinopsis haematantha var. jasimanensis (Rausch) 1998; Echinopsis haematantha var. kuehnrichii (Frič) J.G.Lamb. 1998; Echinopsis hualfinensis (Rausch) H.Friedrich & Glaetzle 1983; Echinopsis kuehnrichii (Frič) H.Friedrich & Glaetzle 1983; Hymenorebutia drijverana (Backeb.) F.Ritter 1980; Hymenorebutia kuehnrichii (Frič) F.Ritter 1980; Lobivia amblayensis Rausch 1972; Lobivia amblayensis var. albispina Rausch 1972; Lobivia chorillosensis Rausch 1974; Lobivia chorrillosensis Rausch 1974; Lobivia cincero Frič 1930; Lobivia drijveriana Backeb. 1933; Lobivia drijveriana var. astranthema Backeb. 1934; Lobivia drijveriana var. aurantiaca Backeb. 1934; Lobivia drijveriana var. nobilis Backeb. 1934; Lobivia elongata Backeb. 1956 publ. 1957; Lobivia haematantha var. amblayensis (Rausch) Rausch 1982; Lobivia haematantha subvar. amblayensis (Rausch) Rausch 1975; Lobivia haematantha var. cachensis (Speg.) J.Ullmann 1992; Lobivia haematantha subsp. chorrillosensis (Rausch) Rausch 1982; Lobivia haematantha var. chorrillosensis (Rausch) Rausch 1985-1986 publ. 1987; Lobivia haematantha subsp. chorrillosensis (Rausch) Rausch 1977; Lobivia haematantha subvar. chorrillosensis (Rausch) Rausch 1975; Lobivia haematantha f. drijveriana (Backeb.) M.H.J.van der Meer 2020; Lobivia haematantha var. drijveriana (Backeb.) G.D.Rowley 1982; Lobivia haematantha var. elongata (Backeb.) Rausch 1982; Lobivia haematantha subvar. elongata (Backeb.) Rausch (1975; Lobivia haematantha var. fechseri (Rausch) Rausch 1982; Lobivia haematantha subvar. fechseri (Rausch) Rausch 1975; Lobivia haematantha var. hualfinensis (Rausch) Rausch 1982; Lobivia haematantha subvar. hualfinensis (Rausch) Rausch 1975; Lobivia haematantha var. jasimanensis Rausch 1985-1986 publ. 1987; Lobivia haematantha var. kuehnrichii (Frič) Rausch 1975; Lobivia haematantha subsp. kuehnrichii (Frič) Rausch 1982; Lobivia haematantha var. viridis Rausch 1985-1986 publ. 1987; Lobivia hualfinensis Rausch 1968; Lobivia hualfinensis var. fechseri Rausch 1972; Lobivia kuehnrichii Frič 1931; Lobivia kuehnrichii var. antennifera Rausch 2010; Lobivia mirabunda Backeb. 1956 publ. 1957

= Echinopsis haematantha =

Species of cactus

Echinopsis haematantha, is a species of Echinopsis found in Argentina and Bolivia.

== Description ==
Echinopsis haematantha grows singly or branching, and then forms small groups, with a large carrot-like taproot. The flattened spherical to short cylindrical, olive green to brownish green to gray-green shoots reach heights of up to 12 cm (4.7 in) with diameters of 5 to 8 cm (2.0 to 3.1 in). There are twelve to 15 low and narrow ribs arranged in a spiral. The circular areoles on them are white. Yellow to dark brown or black spines emerge from them. There are one to four central spines are unequal, strong are often hooked and up to 6 cm (2.4 in) long and ten to twelve radial spines that are thin, needle-like, and interwoven, to 1.2 cm (0.47 in) long.

The short, funnel-shaped, yellow to orange to slightly purple flowers open during the day. They have a diameter of 3 to 4 cm (1.2 to 1.6 in). The spherical to egg-shaped, green to purple-brown fruits are semi-dry and tear open.

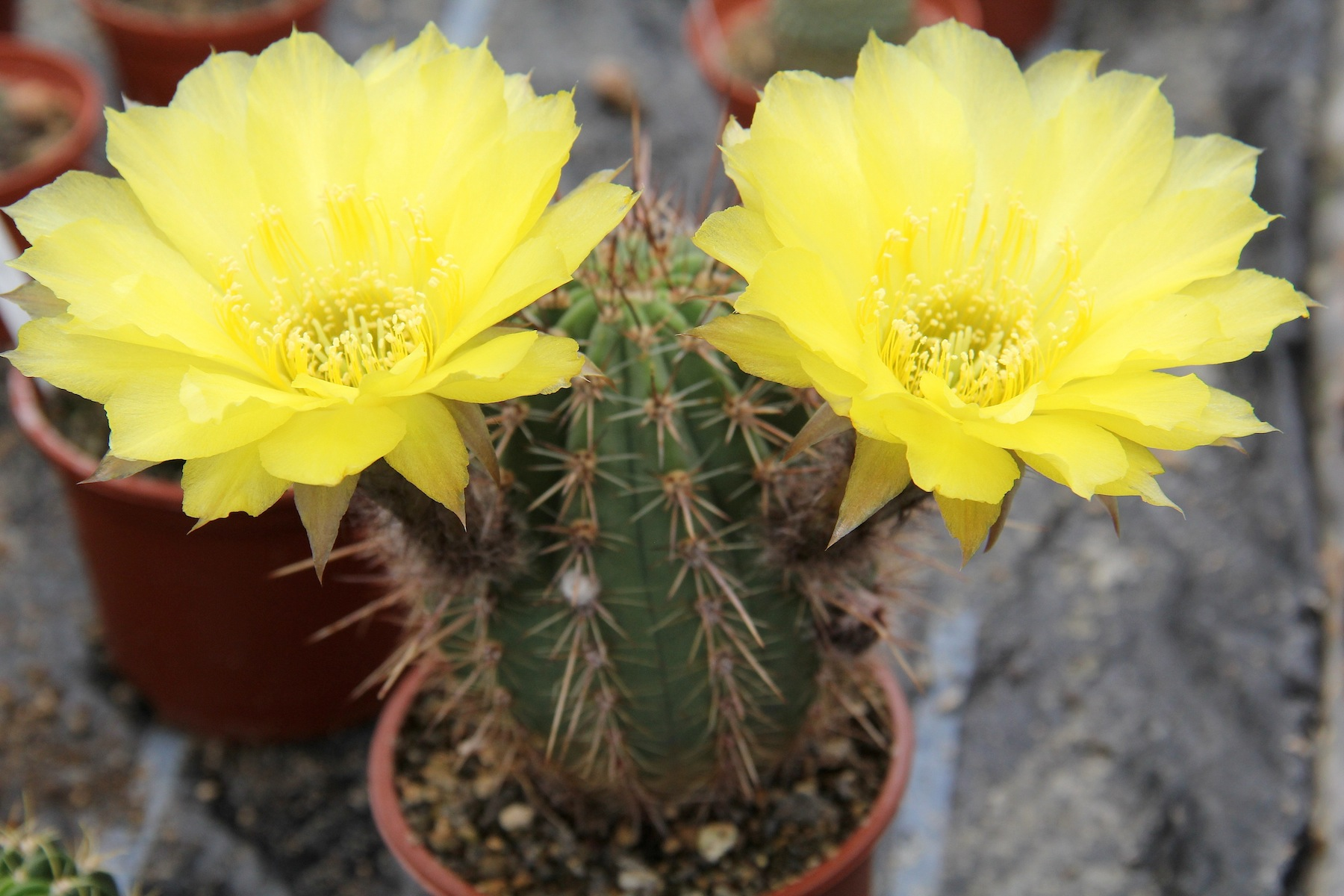

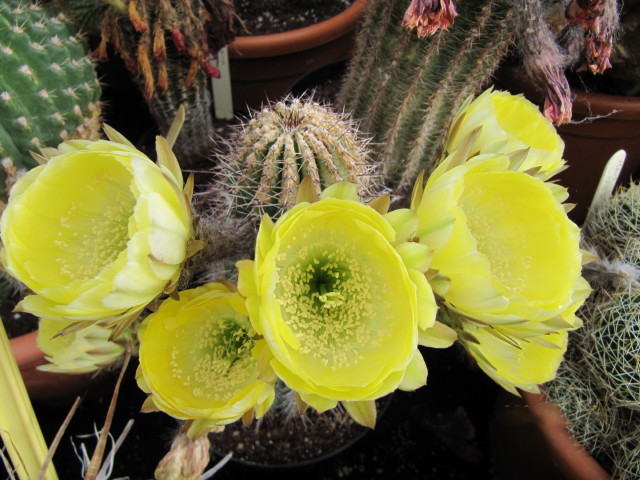

== Distribution ==
Echinopsis haematantha is widespread in the Argentine provinces of Salta, Tucumán and Catamarca at altitudes of 2000 to 3000 meters.

== Taxonomy ==
The first description as Echinocactus haematanthus by Carlos Luis Spegazzini was published in 1905. The specific epithet haematantha is derived from the Greek words haima for 'blood' and anthos for 'flower' and refers to the dark red flowers of the species. David Richard Hunt placed the species in the genus Echinopsis in 1991. Another nomenclature synonym is Lobivia haematantha (Speg.) Britton & Rose (1922).
