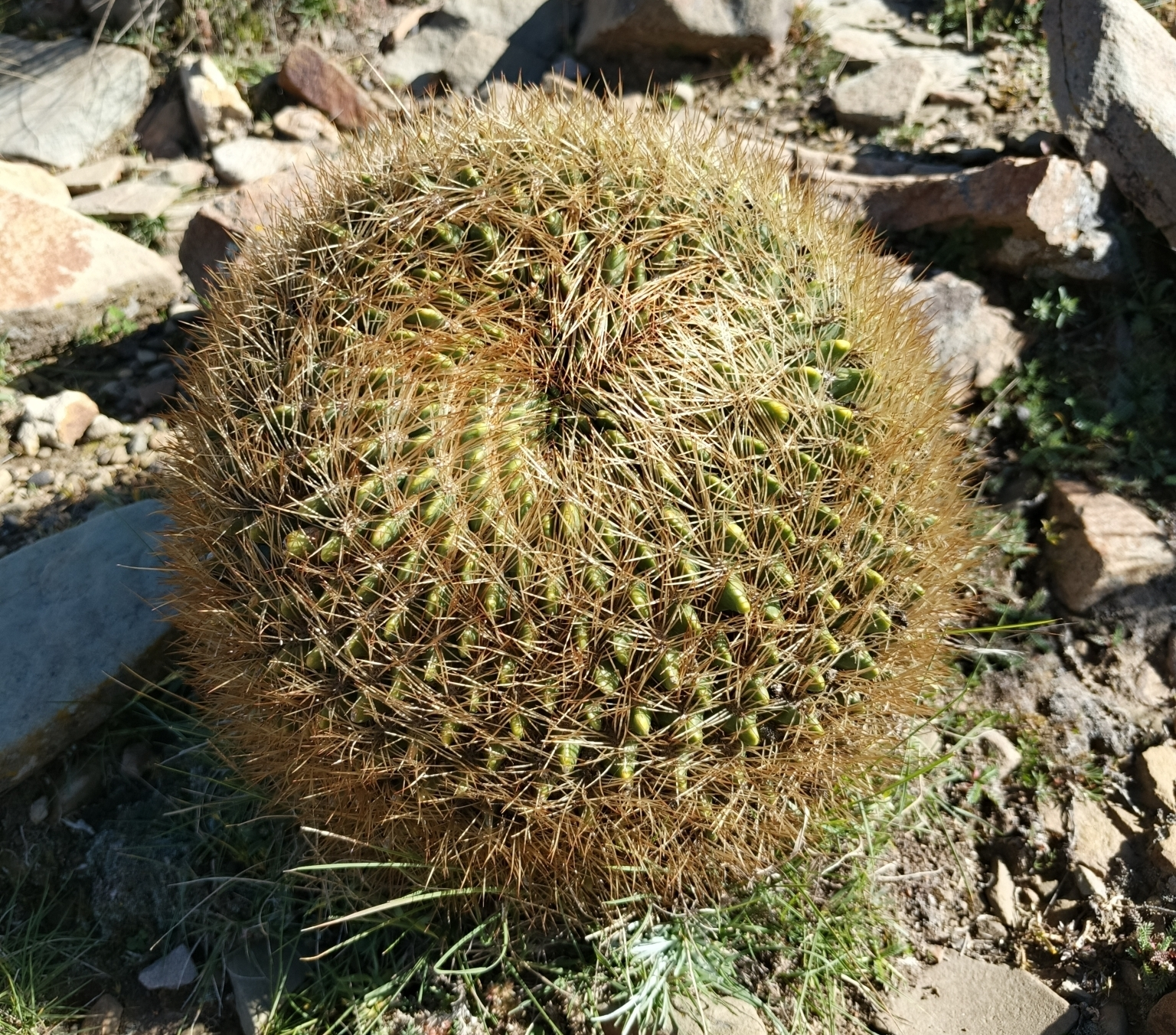

Scientific classification
- Kingdom: Plantae
- Clade: Tracheophytes
- Clade: Angiosperms
- Clade: Eudicots
- Order: Caryophyllales
- Family: Cactaceae
- Subfamily: Cactoideae
- Genus: Echinopsis
- Species: E. minutiflora

Binomial name
- Echinopsis minutiflora (Rausch) M.Lowry

Synonyms
- Lobivia chrysochete var. minutiflora Rausch; Lobivia minutiflora (Rausch) Schlumpb. & M.Lowry

= Echinopsis minutiflora =

Species of cactus

Echinopsis minutiflora is a species of flowering plant in the cactus family Cactaceae, native to northwest Argentina and Bolivia. It was first described by Walter Rausch in 1977 as Lobivia chrysochete var. minutiflora, and first raised to a full species in 2012 as Lobivia minutiflora.
