= Echinopsis breviflora =

Scientific classification
- Kingdom: Plantae
- Clade: Tracheophytes
- Clade: Angiosperms
- Clade: Eudicots
- Order: Caryophyllales
- Family: Cactaceae
- Subfamily: Cactoideae
- Genus: Echinopsis
- Species: E. breviflora

Binomial name
- Echinopsis breviflora (Backeb.) M.Lowry

Synonyms
- Lobivia breviflora Backeb.; Lobivia sanguiniflora var. breviflora (Backeb.) Rausch

Species of cactus

Echinopsis breviflora is a species of flowering plant in the cactus family Cactaceae, native to northwest Argentina. It was first described by Curt Backeberg in 1936 as Lobivia breviflora.
