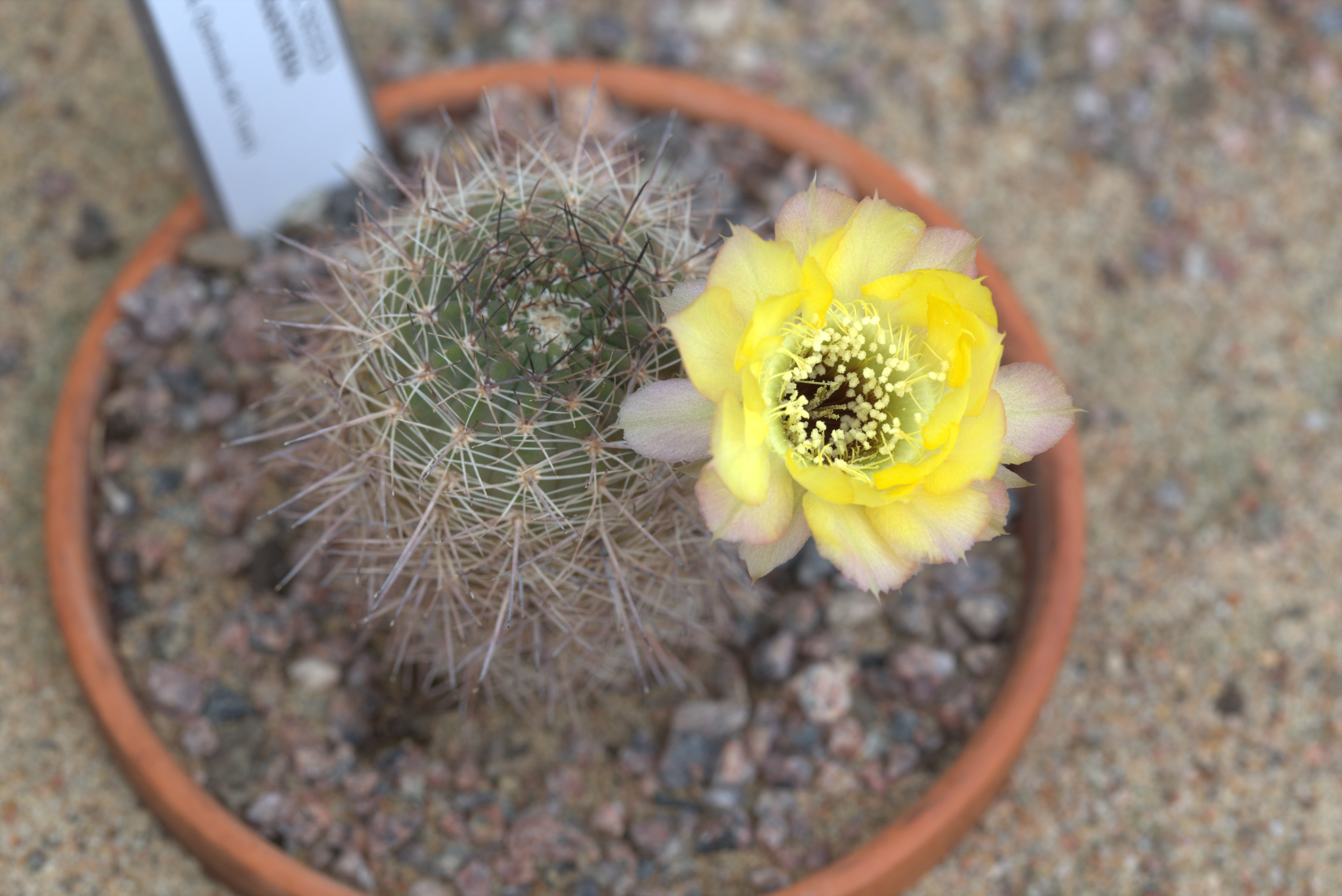

Conservation status
- Vulnerable (IUCN 3.1)

Scientific classification
- Kingdom: Plantae
- Clade: Tracheophytes
- Clade: Angiosperms
- Clade: Eudicots
- Order: Caryophyllales
- Family: Cactaceae
- Subfamily: Cactoideae
- Genus: Echinopsis
- Species: E. chrysantha

Binomial name
- Echinopsis chrysantha Werderm.

Synonyms
- Hymenorebutia chrysantha (Werderm.) F.Ritter 1980; Lobivia chrysantha (Werderm.) Backeb. in C.Backeberg & F.M.Knuth 1936; Andenea staffenii (Frič) Frič 1935; Echinopsis hossei Werderm. 1931; Lobivia chrysantha var. hossei (Werderm.) Backeb. 1942; Lobivia chrysantha var. hypocyrta Rausch 1972; Lobivia chrysantha subvar. hypocyrta (Rausch) Rausch 1975; Lobivia chrysantha var. janseniana Backeb. 1942; Lobivia chrysantha var. klusacekii (Frič) Rausch 1982; Lobivia chrysantha subvar. klusacekii (Frič) Rausch 1975; Lobivia chrysantha var. leucacantha Backeb. 1942; Lobivia hossei (Werderm.) Backeb. 1936; Lobivia klusacekii Frič 1931; Lobivia polaskiana Backeb. 1948; Lobivia staffenii Frič 1931

= Echinopsis chrysantha =

Species of cactus

Echinopsis chrysantha, is a species of Echinopsis cactus found in Argentina.

== Description ==
Echinopsis chrysantha grows solitary. The depressed spherical to short cylindrical, dull grey-green shoots have a diameter of 6 to 7 cm (2.4 to 2.8 in) and a growth height of 4 to 6 cm (1.6 to 2.4 in). The shoots form an enlarged, carrot-like taproot. There are eight to twelve (rarely up to 26) straight or slightly oblique ribs that are slightly bumpy. The areoles on it are about 1.5 cm (0.59 in) apart. Reddish-brown spines emerge from them, which turn gray with age. Central spines are not formed. The five to seven (rarely from three) laterally radiating radial spines have a length of up to 2 cm (0.79 in).

The broad, funnel-shaped flowers appear laterally on the shoots and open during the day. They are yellow to orange with a darker reddish purple throat. The flowers are up to 5 cm (2.0 in) long.

== Distribution ==
Echinopsis chrysantha is widespread in the Argentine province of Salta in the Quebrada del Toro at altitudes of 2000 to 3000 meters.

== Taxonomy ==
The first description by Erich Werdermann was published in 1931. The specific epithet chrysantha comes from Greek and means 'with (golden) yellow flowers'. Nomenclature synonyms are Lobivia chrysantha (Werderm.) Backeb. (1935) and Hymenorebutia chrysantha (Werderm.) F.Ritter (1980).
