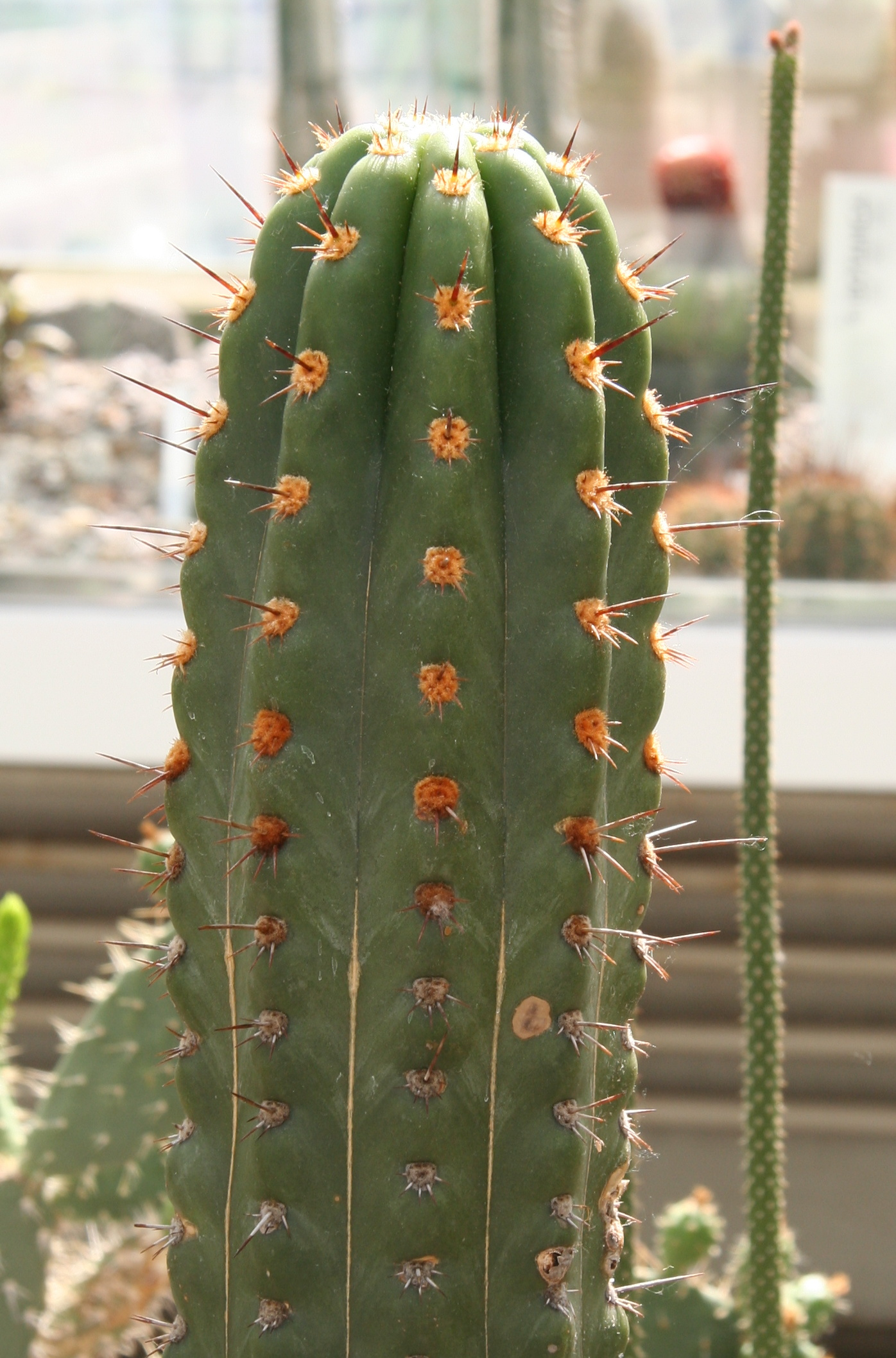

Scientific classification
- Kingdom: Plantae
- Clade: Tracheophytes
- Clade: Angiosperms
- Clade: Eudicots
- Order: Caryophyllales
- Family: Cactaceae
- Subfamily: Cactoideae
- Genus: Echinopsis
- Species: E. clavata

Binomial name
- Echinopsis clavata (F.Ritter) D.R.Hunt 1997

Synonyms
- Trichocereus clavatus F.Ritter 1980

= Echinopsis clavata =

Species of cactus

Echinopsis clavata, is a species of Echinopsis cactus found in Bolivia.

== Description ==
Echinopsis clavatus grows shrubby, branches from the base and is more or less prostrate and creeping. The club-shaped, dark green shoots are 1 to 2 meters long and have a diameter of 7 to 15 cm (2.8 to 5.9 in) with seven to ten blunt ribs that are notched. The round areoles are densely covered with orange-brown wool and are 1.5 to 2.2 cm (0.59 to 0.87 in) apart. Dark brown, needle-like, mostly straight spines emerge from them. The usually single, very strong central spine is 2 to 9 cm (0.79 to 3.54 in) long and four to eight slightly spread out radial spines are 0.5 to 3 cm (0.20 to 1.18 in) long. The funnel-shaped, white flowers reach a length of up to 18 cm (7.1 in).

== Distribution ==
Echinopsis clavatus is widespread in the Bolivian department of La Paz at altitudes of 2500 to 3000 meters.

== Taxonomy ==
The first description by Friedrich Ritter was published in 1980 as Trichocereus clavatus. The specific epithet clavatus comes from Latin, means 'club-shaped' and refers to the shape of the shoots.
