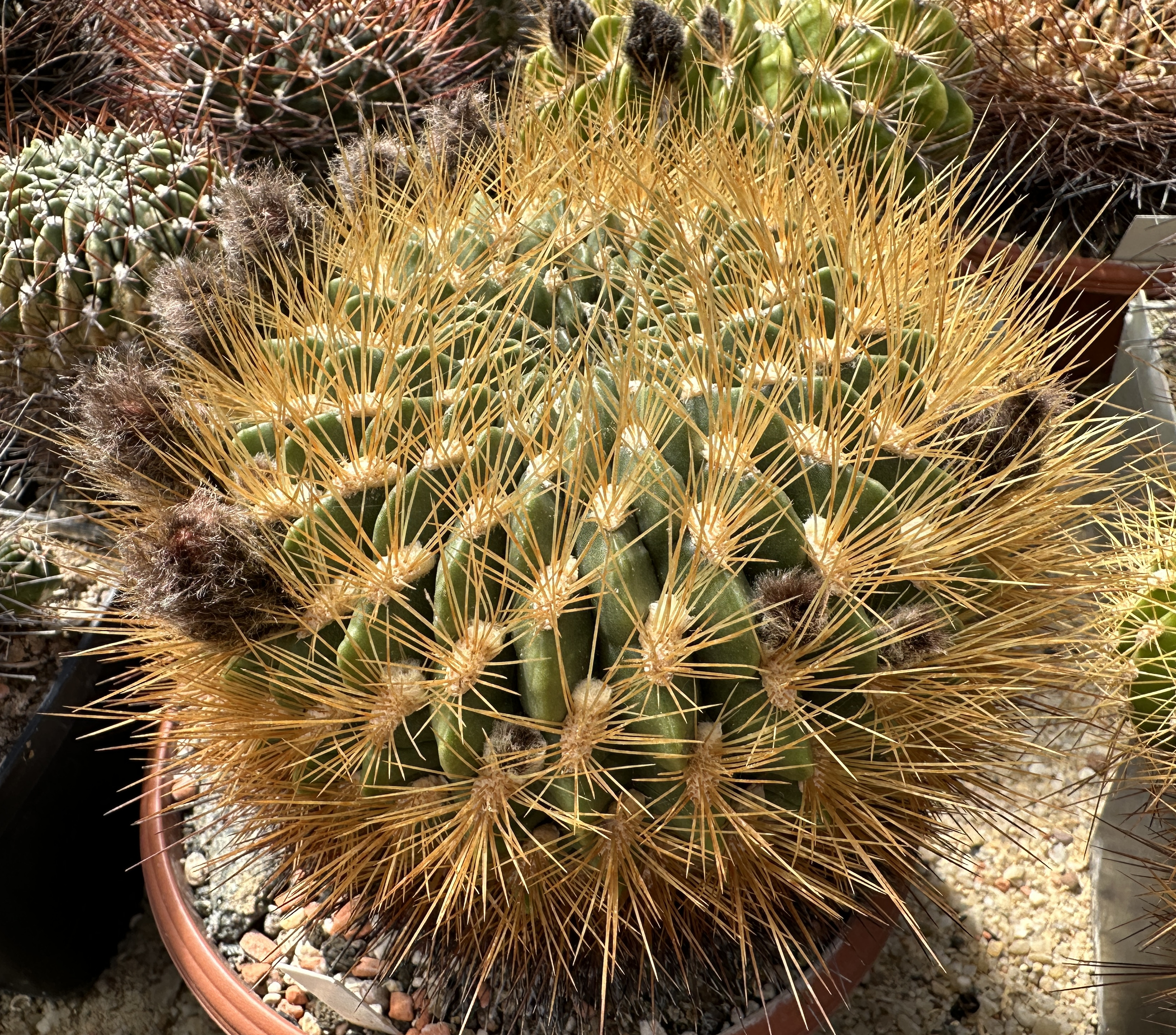

Conservation status
- Least Concern (IUCN 3.1)

Scientific classification
- Kingdom: Plantae
- Clade: Tracheophytes
- Clade: Angiosperms
- Clade: Eudicots
- Order: Caryophyllales
- Family: Cactaceae
- Subfamily: Cactoideae
- Genus: Echinopsis
- Species: E. chrysochete

Binomial name
- Echinopsis chrysochete Werderm.

Synonyms
- Lobivia chrysochete (Werderm.) Wessner; Lobivia chrysochete var. hystrix (F.Ritter) J.Ullmann; Lobivia chrysochete var. markusii (Rausch) Rausch, with incorrect basionym citation; Lobivia chrysochete var. subtilis Rausch; Lobivia chrysochete var. tenuispina (F.Ritter) Rausch; Lobivia hystrix F.Ritter; Lobivia markusii Rausch; Lobivia tenuispina F.Ritter

= Echinopsis chrysochete =

Species of cactus

Echinopsis chrysochete, synonyms including Lobivia chrysochete, is a species of Echinopsis found in Bolivia and northwest Argentina.

== Description ==
Echinopsis chrysochete grows singly or forms groups. The flattened, spherical to spherical, green shoots have a diameter of up to 25 centimeters. There are around 20 slightly crooked ribs that are humps. The yellow to brownish thorns that emerge from the areoles are thin and bristle-like. The three to five central spines are up to 8 centimeters long. The number of marginal spines is up to approximately 30.

The broad and short funnel-shaped flowers are shiny orange to red and have a whitish throat. The flowers reach a diameter of 2.5 to 4 centimeters.

== Taxonomy ==
The first description by Erich Werdermann was published in 1936. The specific epithet chrysochete is derived from the Greek words chrysos for 'gold' and chaite for 'long hair' and refers to the yellow, bristly thorns of the species. Wilhelm Wessner placed the species in the genus Lobivia in 1938. It has since been returned to Echinopsis.

== Distribution ==
Echinopsis chrysochete is distributed in the Bolivian departments of Chuquisaca, Tarija and possibly Potosí as well as the Argentine provinces of Jujuy and Salta at altitudes of 2500 to 4000 meters.
