= Echinopsis chalaensis =

Scientific classification
- Kingdom: Plantae
- Clade: Tracheophytes
- Clade: Angiosperms
- Clade: Eudicots
- Order: Caryophyllales
- Family: Cactaceae
- Subfamily: Cactoideae
- Genus: Echinopsis
- Species: E. chalaensis

Binomial name
- Echinopsis chalaensis (Rauh & Backeb.) Friedrich & G.D. Rowley 1974

Species of cactus

Echinopsis chalaensis, is a species of Echinopsis cactus found in Peru.

== Description ==
Echinopsis chalaensis grows as a shrub with several upright branches and reaches heights of up to 4 meters. The cylindrical shoots have a diameter of up to 15 cm (5.9 in). There are eight broad ribs that are furrowed transversely above the areoles. The areoles on it stand in the notches. Dark brown spines emerge from them and become lighter with age. The two to three central spines are up to 5 cm (2.0 in) long with six to ten radial spines are up to 1 cm (0.39 in) long.

The funnel-shaped, white flowers open at night. They grow up to 17 cm (6.7 in) long and have a diameter of 10 cm (3.9 in).

== Distribution ==
Echinopsis chalaensis is common in the Arequipa region of Peru on coastal hills, where it is often found hanging from rocks.

== Taxonomy ==
The first description by Werner Rauh and Curt Backeberg was published in 1957. The specific epithet chalaensis refers to the occurrence of the species near Chala in the Arequipa region of Peru. A nomenclature synonym is Echinopsis chalaensis (Rauh & Backeb.) H.Friedrich & G.D.Rowley (1974) and Trichocereus chalaensis Rauh & Backeb. (1956 publ. 1957).
