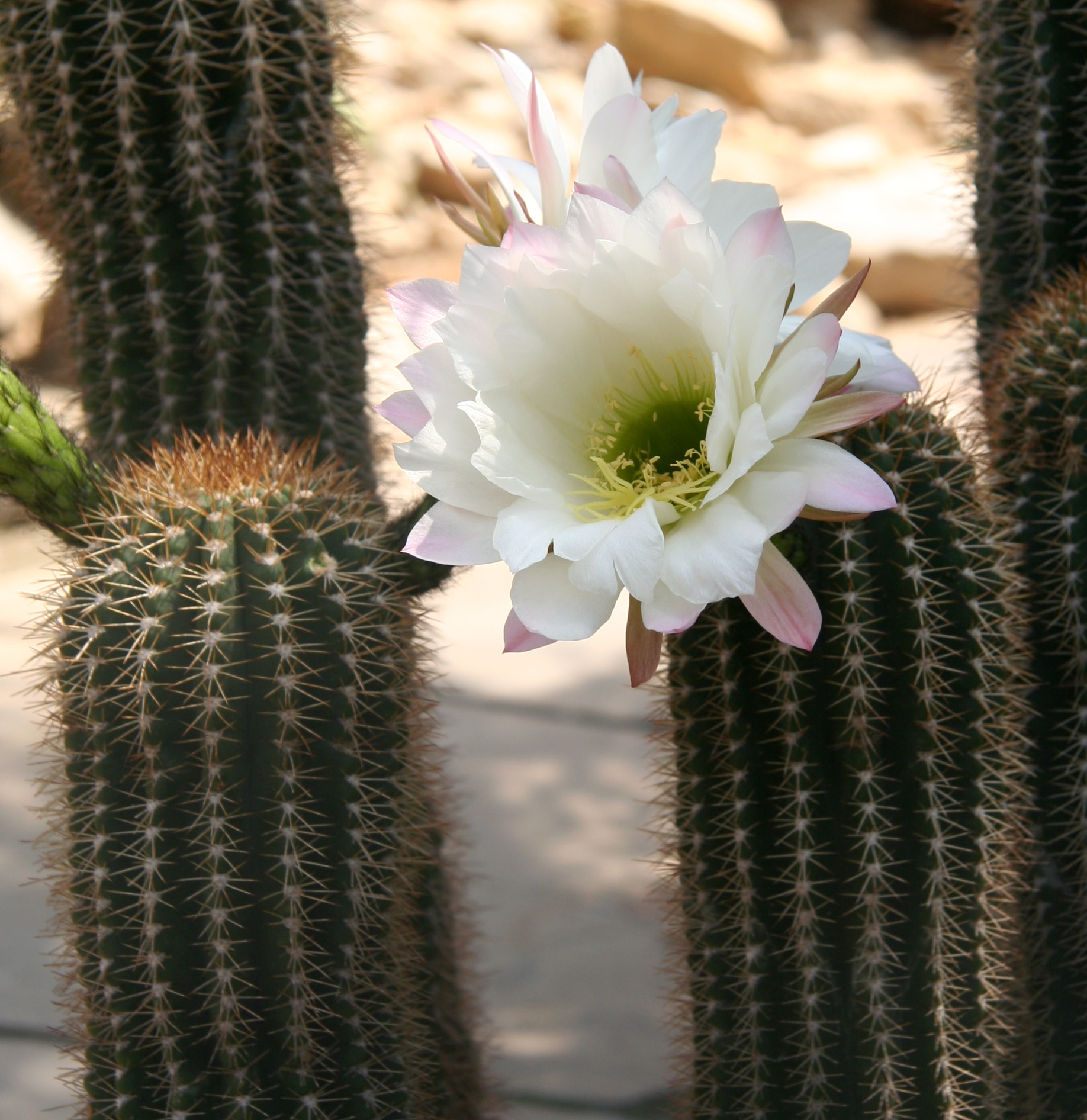

Conservation status
- Endangered (IUCN 3.1)

Scientific classification
- Kingdom: Plantae
- Clade: Tracheophytes
- Clade: Angiosperms
- Clade: Eudicots
- Order: Caryophyllales
- Family: Cactaceae
- Subfamily: Cactoideae
- Genus: Echinopsis
- Species: E. smrziana

Binomial name
- Echinopsis smrziana Backeb.

Synonyms
- Soehrensia smrziana (Backeb.) Backeb.; Trichocereus smrzianus (Backeb.) Backeb.

= Echinopsis smrziana =

Species of cacti

Echinopsis smrziana, synonym Soehrensia smrziana, is a species of Echinopsis found in northwest Argentina.

== Description ==
Echinopsis smrziana grows solitary or often forms clumps, reaching up to 0.5 m (1.6 ft) in height and 1.5 m (4.9 ft) in diameter. Its shoots are spherical to cylindrical or columnar, fresh green to gray-green, and initially prostrate before becoming upright. They can be up to 40 cm (16 in) long and 20 cm (8 in) in diameter. The plant has eleven to 13 broad ribs. It has seven to 14 spines that are whitish to golden brown, thin, piercing, and needle-like to bristly. The central spine is usually single and up to 3 cm (1.2 in) long, while the radial spines are 1 to 2.5 cm (0.4 to 1.0 in) long.

White flowers appear near the top of the shoot and are 13 to 17 cm (5 to 7 in) long. The spherical, green-yellow fruits are very juicy and tear vertically, with a diameter of 2.5 to 4 cm (1.0 to 1.6 in).

== Taxonomy ==
Curt Backeberg first described the species as Echinopsis smrziana in 1936, naming it after Czech gardener and cactus enthusiast Oskar Smrz. In 1959, the species was reclassified into the genus Soehrensia. As of February 2026, Plants of the World Online placed it in the genus Echinopsis.

== Distribution ==
Echinopsis smrziana is native to northwest Argentina. It is found in the Argentine province of Salta at altitudes of 1,500 to 2,500 m (4,900 to 8,200 ft).
