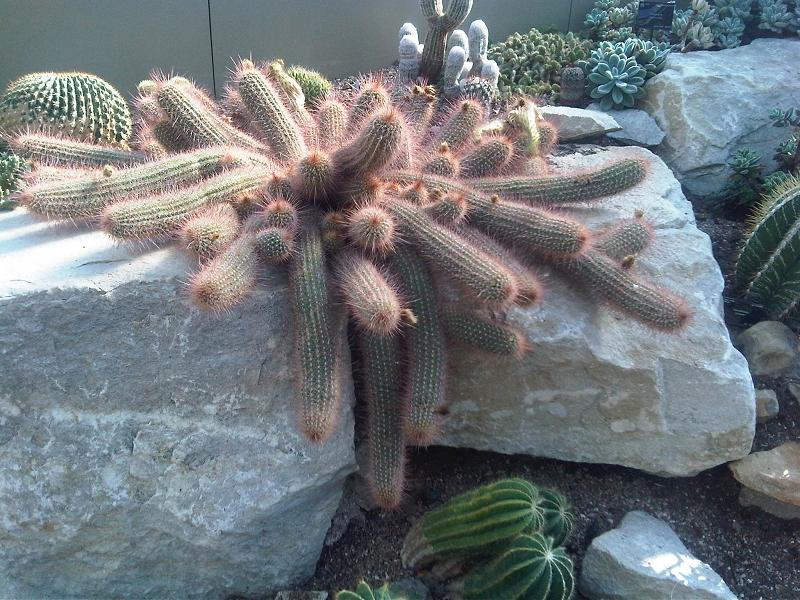

Conservation status
- Vulnerable (IUCN 3.1)

Scientific classification
- Kingdom: Plantae
- Clade: Tracheophytes
- Clade: Angiosperms
- Clade: Eudicots
- Order: Caryophyllales
- Family: Cactaceae
- Subfamily: Cactoideae
- Genus: Echinopsis
- Species: E. caulescens

Binomial name
- Echinopsis caulescens (F.Ritter) M.Lowry

Synonyms
- Soehrensia caulescens (F.Ritter) Schlumpb.; Trichocereus camarguensis subsp. caulescens (F.Ritter) Guiggi; Trichocereus caulescens F.Ritter

= Echinopsis caulescens =

Species of cacti

Echinopsis caulescens, synonym Soehrensia caulescens, is a species of Echinopsis found in Bolivia.
