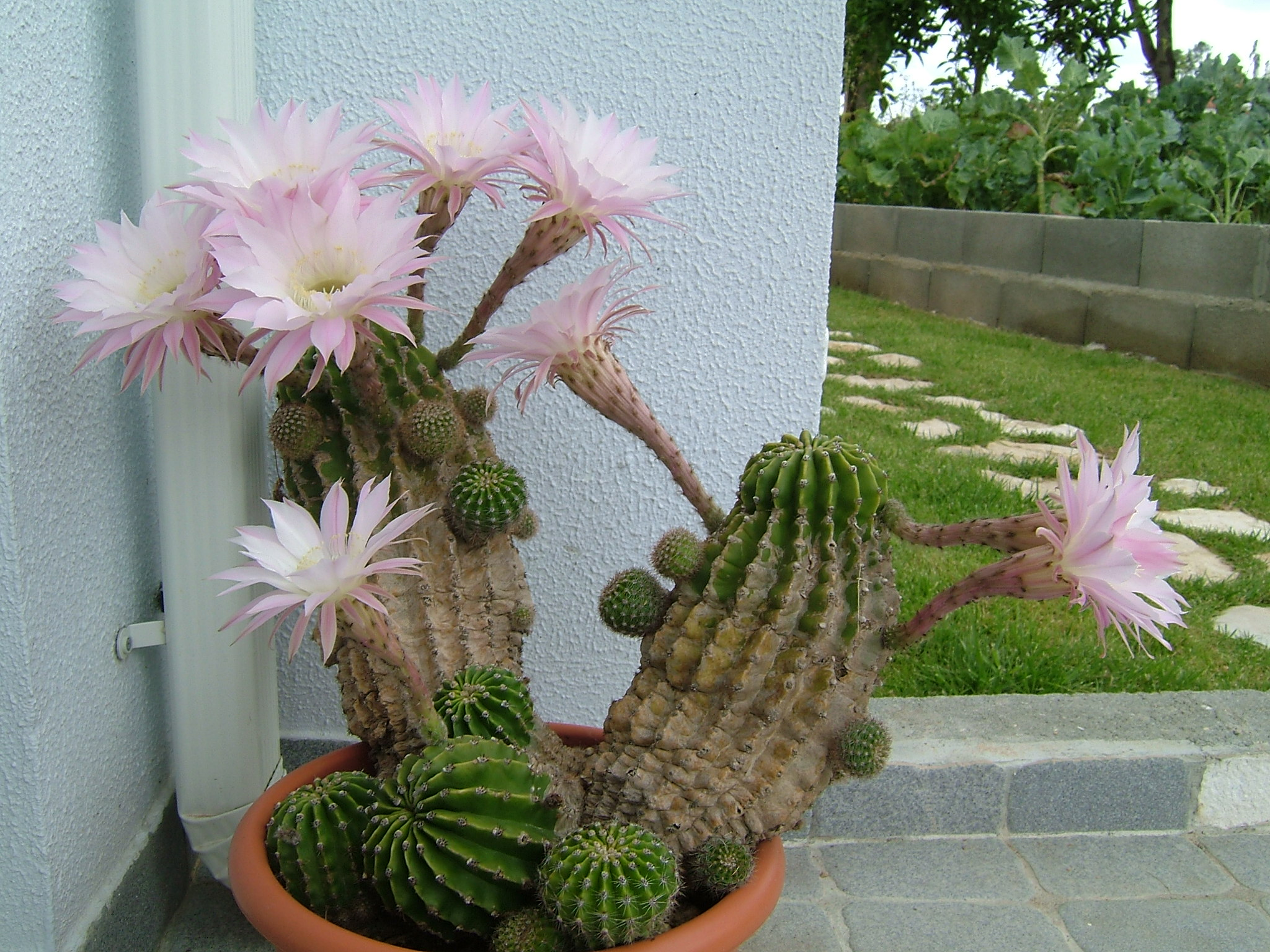

Scientific classification
- Kingdom: Plantae
- Clade: Tracheophytes
- Clade: Angiosperms
- Clade: Eudicots
- Order: Caryophyllales
- Family: Cactaceae
- Subfamily: Cactoideae
- Genus: Echinopsis
- Species: E. werdermannii

Binomial name
- Echinopsis werdermannii Frič ex Fleisch. 1962

Synonyms
- Echinopsis oxygona f. werdermannii (Frič ex Fleisch.) J.Ullmann 2014

= Echinopsis werdermannii =

Species of cactus

Echinopsis werdermannii is a species of Echinopsis cactus found in Paraguay.

== Description ==
Echinopsis werdermannii grows singly. The spherical, gray-green shoots reach diameters of up to 12 cm (4.7 in) and heights of up to 8 centimeters. There are ten to twelve straight and sharp-edged ribs. The single black central spine is up to 0.2 cm (0.079 in) long. The three to eight radial spines are blackish.

The long, tube-shaped, funnel-shaped flowers are light pink. The flowers are up to 20 centimeters long.

== Distribution ==
Echinopsis werdermannii is found in Paraguay.

== Taxonomy ==
The first description by Zdenĕk Fleischer was published in 1962. Zdenĕk Fleischer attributed the name to the Czech Alberto Vojtěch Frič. However, according to Article 8.4 of the International Code of Botanical Nomenclature, Echinopsis werrmannii has not been validly published because the type specimen on which the first description is based has not been permanently preserved, for example through a herbarium specimen.
