= Echinopsis friedrichii =

Scientific classification
- Kingdom: Plantae
- Clade: Tracheophytes
- Clade: Angiosperms
- Clade: Eudicots
- Order: Caryophyllales
- Family: Cactaceae
- Subfamily: Cactoideae
- Genus: Echinopsis
- Species: E. friedrichii

Binomial name
- Echinopsis friedrichii G.D.Rowley

Synonyms
- Soehrensia schickendantzii subsp. shaferi (Britton & Rose) Lodé; Soehrensia shaferi (Britton & Rose) Schlumpb.; Trichocereus shaferi Britton & Rose

Species of cacti

Echinopsis friedrichii, synonym Soehrensia shaferi, is a species of Echinopsis found in northwest Argentina.
