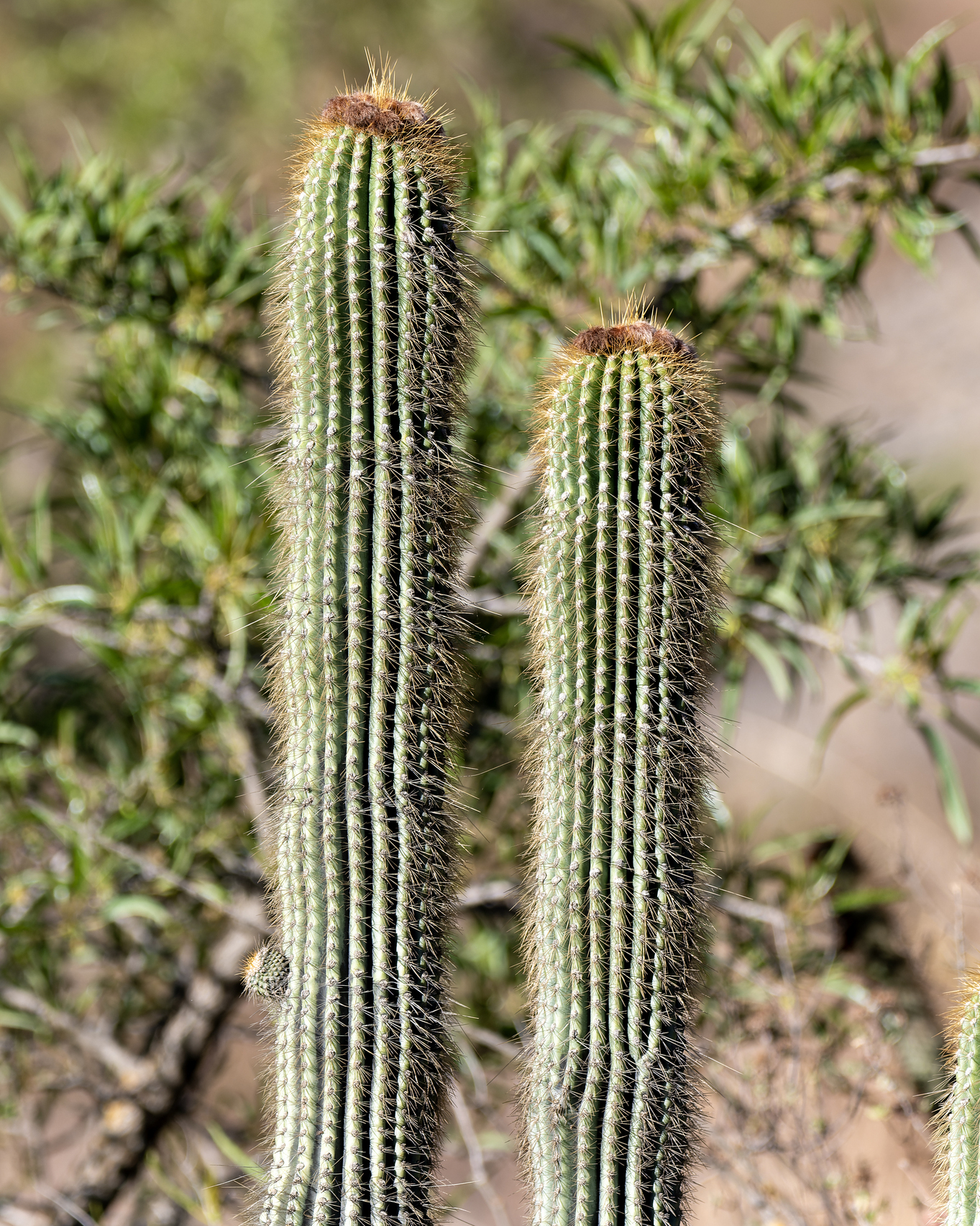

Scientific classification
- Kingdom: Plantae
- Clade: Tracheophytes
- Clade: Angiosperms
- Clade: Eudicots
- Order: Caryophyllales
- Family: Cactaceae
- Subfamily: Cactoideae
- Genus: Echinopsis
- Species: E. volliana

Binomial name
- Echinopsis volliana (Backeb.) H.Friedrich & G.D.Rowley

Synonyms
- List: Echinopsis tacaquirensis subsp. taquimbalensis (Cárdenas) G.Navarro; Echinopsis taquimbalensis (Cárdenas) H.Friedrich & G.D.Rowley; Echinopsis taquimbalensis var. wilkeae (Backeb.) H.Friedrich & G.D.Rowley; Echinopsis taratensis (Cárdenas) H.Friedrich & G.D.Rowley; Echinopsis volliana var. rubrispina (Backeb.) H.Friedrich & G.D.Rowley; Soehrensia volliana (Backeb.) Schlumpb.; Trichocereus tacaquirensis subsp. taquimbalensis (Cárdenas) Guiggi; Trichocereus taquimbalensis Cárdenas; Trichocereus taquimbalensis var. wilkeae Backeb.; Trichocereus taratensis Cárdenas; Trichocereus vollianus Backeb.; Trichocereus vollianus var. rubrispinus Backeb.

= Echinopsis volliana =

Species of cacti

Echinopsis volliana, synonym Soehrensia volliana, is a species of Echinopsis found in Bolivia.
