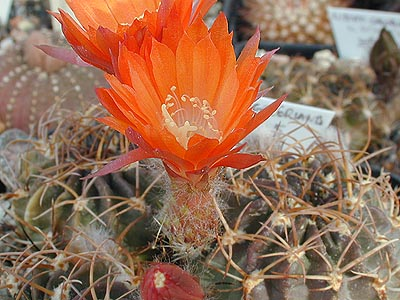

Conservation status
- Least Concern (IUCN 3.1)

Scientific classification
- Kingdom: Plantae
- Clade: Tracheophytes
- Clade: Angiosperms
- Clade: Eudicots
- Order: Caryophyllales
- Family: Cactaceae
- Subfamily: Cactoideae
- Genus: Echinopsis
- Species: E. tegeleriana

Binomial name
- Echinopsis tegeleriana (Backeb.) D.R.Hunt

Synonyms
- Acanthanthus ayacuchensis (Johnson & Y.Ito) Y.Itô; Acanthanthus tegelerianus (Backeb.) Y.Itô, without full basionym reference; Acantholobivia incuiensis (Rauh & Backeb.) Rauh & Backeb.; Acantholobivia tegeleriana (Backeb.) Backeb.; Lobivia akersii Rausch; Lobivia ayacuchensis Johnson & Y.Ito; Lobivia incuiensis Rauh & Backeb.; Lobivia tegeleriana Backeb.; Lobivia tegeleriana var. akersii (Rausch) Rausch; Lobivia tegeleriana var. incuiensis (Rauh & Backeb.) Rausch; Lobivia tegeleriana var. puquiensis F.Ritter

= Echinopsis tegeleriana =

Species of cactus

Echinopsis tegeleriana, synonyms including Lobivia tegeleriana, is a species of Echinopsis found in Peru.

== Description ==
Echinopsis tegeleriana grows singly or sometimes forms small groups. The spherical, green shoots reach a diameter of up to 9 centimeters. They form a large taproot. There are around 16 clearly skewed ribs, which are divided into hatchet-shaped cusps. The areoles on them are elongated and are up to 1.7 centimeters apart. Ten to twelve horn-colored, slightly curved thorns emerge from them, have a darker tip and are 1 in 2 centimeters long. The longest spine is occasionally hooked.

The red to orange or yellow flowers have a more or less pink-orange throat and appear on the sides of the shoots. They are up to 4 centimeters long. The flower tube is short in relation to the flower bracts. The spherical, green fruits are thin-skinned and juicy. They usually become thorny as they mature and reach a diameter of up to 2.5 centimeters.

== Taxonomy ==
The first description by Curt Backeberg as Lobivia tegeleriana was published in 1936. It was transferred to the genus Echinopsis in 1987. The specific epithet tegeleriana honors the Hamburg government councillor Wilhelm Tegeler.

== Distribution ==
Echinopsis tegeleriana is widespread in the Peruvian regions of Lima, Junín, Huancavelica and Ayacucho at altitudes above 3000 meters.
