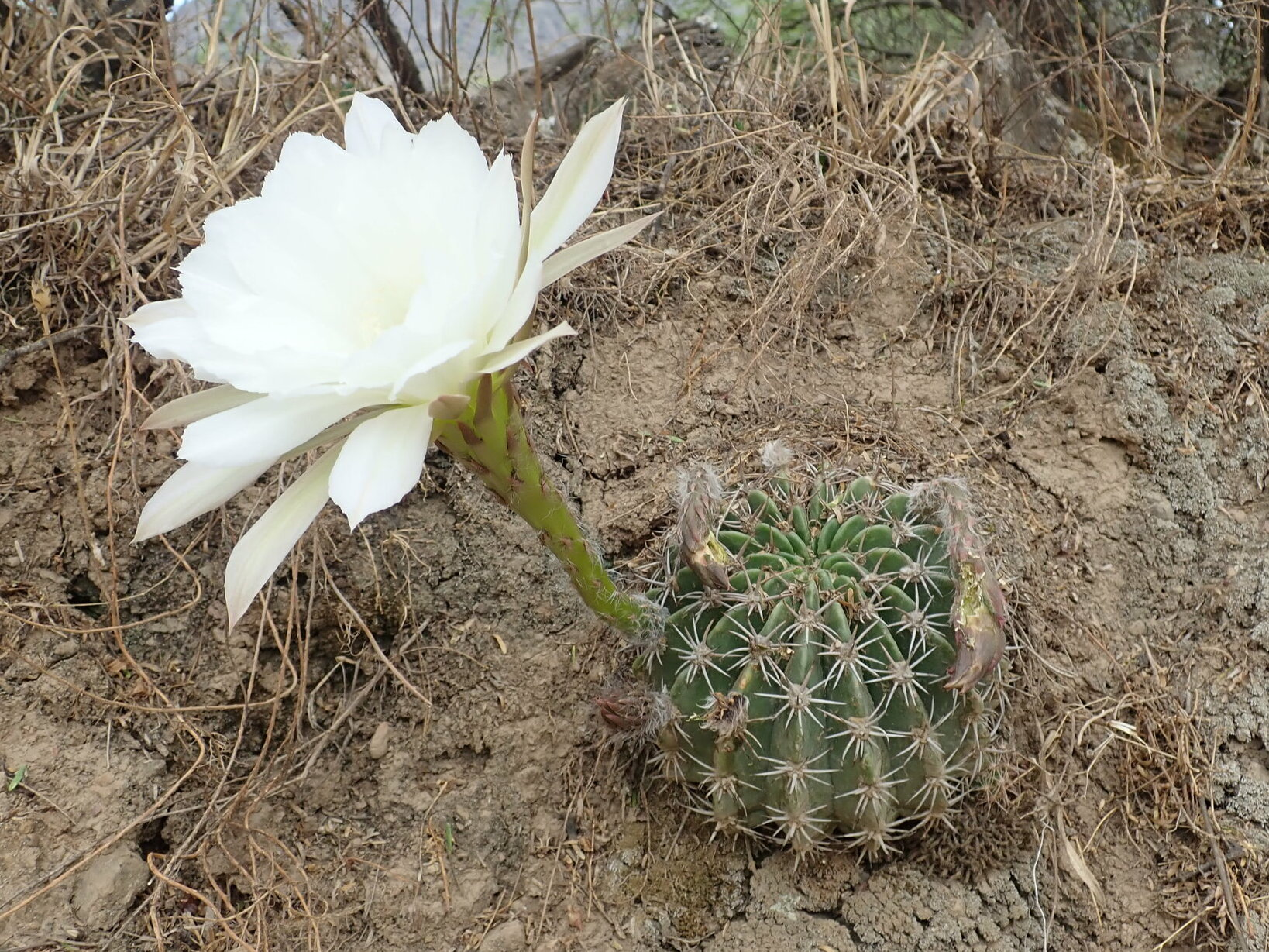

Scientific classification
- Kingdom: Plantae
- Clade: Tracheophytes
- Clade: Angiosperms
- Clade: Eudicots
- Order: Caryophyllales
- Family: Cactaceae
- Subfamily: Cactoideae
- Genus: Echinopsis
- Species: E. pamparuizii

Binomial name
- Echinopsis pamparuizii Cárdenas

Synonyms
- Lobivia pamparuizii (Cárdenas) Schlumpb.

= Echinopsis pamparuizii =

Species of cactus

Echinopsis pamparuizii, synonym Lobivia pamparuizii, is a species of flowering plant in the cactus family Cactaceae, native to Peru and Bolivia. It was first described by Martín Cárdenas in 1970.
