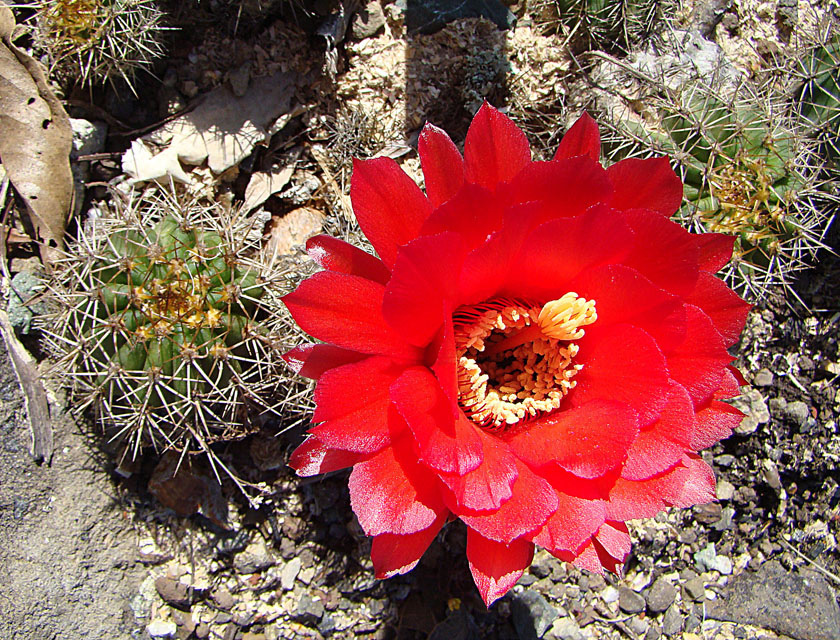

Scientific classification
- Kingdom: Plantae
- Clade: Tracheophytes
- Clade: Angiosperms
- Clade: Eudicots
- Order: Caryophyllales
- Family: Cactaceae
- Subfamily: Cactoideae
- Genus: Echinopsis
- Species: E. crassicaulis

Binomial name
- Echinopsis crassicaulis (R. Kiesling) H.Friedrich & Glaetzle

Synonyms
- List: Helianthocereus crassicaulis Backeb., not validly publ.; Chamaecereus grandiflorus (Britton & Rose) Frič; Echinopsis rowleyi Friedrich; Helianthocereus grandiflorus (Britton & Rose) Backeb.; Lobivia crassicaulis R.Kiesling; Lobivia grandiflora Britton & Rose; Lobivia grandiflora var. crassicaulis (R.Kiesling) Rausch; Lobivia grandiflora var. herzogii Rausch; Lobivia grandiflora var. longispina Rausch; Lobivia grandiflora var. pumila Rausch; Lobivia huascha var. crassicaulis (Backeb.) Rausch, not validly publ.; Lobivia huascha var. grandiflora (Britton & Rose) Rausch; Soehrensia crassicaulis (R.Kiesling) Schlumpb.; Soehrensia grandiflora (Britton & Rose) Schlumpb.; Trichocereus crassicaulis (R.Kiesling) Lodé; Trichocereus rowleyi (Friedrich) R.Kiesling

= Echinopsis crassicaulis =

Species of cactus

Echinopsis crassicaulis, synonyms including Soehrensia grandiflora, is a species of Echinopsis found in Argentina.

== Description ==
Echinopsis crassicaulis often branches from the base and forms small groups. The spherical to briefly cylindrical, green shoots are often tapered towards their tip. They reach heights of up to 16 cm (6.3 in) and have a diameter of 11.5 cm (4.5 in). There are nine to 14 wide and rounded ribs. The areoles on them are light brown and are up to 1.5 cm (0.59 in) apart. Light yellow, brown-tipped thorns emerge from them and become darker with age. The one to five central spines are 3.3 to 3.7 cm (1.3 to 1.5 in) long. The seven to twelve radial spines become quite strong over time and are up to 3 cm (1.2 in) long.

The short, funnel-shaped, red flowers are up to 8 cm (3.1 in) long and reach a diameter of 9 cm (3.5 in).

== Taxonomy ==
The species was described as Lobivia crassicaulis by Roberto Kiesling in 1978. It was transferred to the genus Echinopsis in 1983. Boris O. Schlumpberger placed the species in the genus Soehrensia in 2012. Separately, Lobivia grandiflora was described in 1922, and transferred to the genus Soehrensia in 2012. As of February 2026, Plants of the World Online considered Soehrensia grandiflora to be a synonym of its accepted combination Echinopsis crassicaulis.

== Distribution ==
Echinopsis crassicaulis is native to northwest Argentina. It is widespread in the Argentine province of Catamarca at medium altitudes of 2,500 to 3,000 m (8,200 to 9,800 ft).
