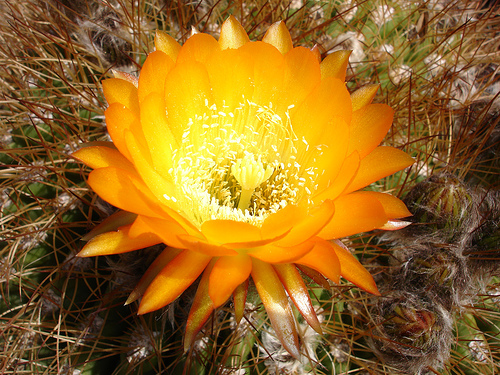

Conservation status
- Least Concern (IUCN 3.1)

Scientific classification
- Kingdom: Plantae
- Clade: Tracheophytes
- Clade: Angiosperms
- Clade: Eudicots
- Order: Caryophyllales
- Family: Cactaceae
- Subfamily: Cactoideae
- Genus: Echinopsis
- Species: E. formosa

Binomial name
- Echinopsis formosa (Pfeiff.) Jacobi ex Salm-Dyck

Synonyms
- Acanthocalycium formosum (Pfeiff.) Backeb.; Echinocactus formosus Pfeiff.; Lobivia formosa (Pfeiff.) Dodds; Soehrensia formosa (Pfeiff.) Backeb.; Trichocereus formosus (Pfeiff.) F.Ritter

= Echinopsis formosa =

Species of cactus

Echinopsis formosa, synonym Soehrensia formosa, is a species of Echinopsis found in north-western Argentina, Bolivia and northern Chile.

== Description ==
Echinopsis formosa grows solitary at first, later occasionally branching out from the base and then forming groups. The spherical to cylindrical, light green to blue-green shoots reach heights of up to 1.5 m (4 ft 11 in) with a diameter of 25 to 50 cm (10 to 20 in), making it the only cactus in South America with the "barrel cactus" habit. There are 27 to 50 rounded ribs that are clearly notched and tuberous. The dark areoles located on them are up to 1 cm (0.39 in) apart. Needle-like, yellowish to reddish-brown spines emerge from them. The two to nine central spines are 3 to 20 cm (1.2 to 7.9 in) long. The nine to 15 radial spines are spread out, straight or slightly curved and have a length of up to 3 cm (1.2 in).

The broad, funnel-shaped, red to orange-red to yellow flowers appear near the top of the shoot and are open during the day. They are 6 to 9 cm (2.4 to 3.5 in) long and have the same diameter. The broad, spherical, green fruit are up to 3 cm (1.2 in) long and 4 cm (1.6 in) in diameter.

== Taxonomy ==
The first description as Echinocactus formosus by Ludwig Karl Georg Pfeiffer was published in 1837. The specific epithet formosa is derived from the Latin word formosus for 'stately' and refers to the appearance of the plants. Boris O. Schlumpberger placed the species in the genus Soehrensia in 2012. As of February 2026, Plants of the World Online placed it in the genus Echinopsis.

=== Subspecies ===
It has four accepted subspecies:

- Echinopsis formosa subsp. formosa
- Echinopsis formosa subsp. kieslingii (Rausch) M.Lowry
- Echinopsis formosa subsp. korethroides (Werderm.) M.Lowry
- Echinopsis formosa subsp. randallii (Cárdenas) M.Lowry

== Distribution ==
Echinopsis formosa is native to north-western Argentina, Bolivia and northern Chile. It is widespread in the Bolivian department of Tarija, in the Argentine provinces of Salta, Tucumán, Catamarca, La Rioja, San Juan and Mendoza as well as in the adjacent northeast of Chile in the high altitudes of the Andes of up to over 4,000 m (13,000 ft) altitude.
