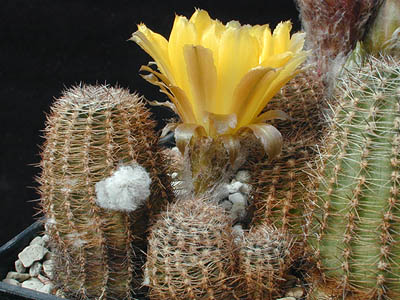

Conservation status
- Least Concern (IUCN 3.1)

Scientific classification
- Kingdom: Plantae
- Clade: Tracheophytes
- Clade: Angiosperms
- Clade: Eudicots
- Order: Caryophyllales
- Family: Cactaceae
- Subfamily: Cactoideae
- Genus: Echinopsis
- Species: E. densispina

Binomial name
- Echinopsis densispina Werderm.

Synonyms
- List: Hymenorebutia densispina (Werderm.) Buining 1939; Lobivia densispina (Werderm.) Buining 1964; Lobivia densispina (Werderm.) Backeb. & F.M.Knuth 1936; Lobivia famatinensis var. densispina (Werderm.) Backeb. 1959; Lobivia haematantha var. densispina (Werderm.) Rausch 1975; Lobivia haematantha subsp. densispina (Werderm.) Rausch 1982; Salpingolobivia densispina (Werderm.) Y.Itô 1957; Echinopsis densispina f. albiflora (Wessner) Buining 1963; Echinopsis densispina f. albolanata (Buining) Buining 1963; Echinopsis densispina f. aurantiaca (Wessner) Buining 1963; Echinopsis densispina f. blossfeldii (Wessner) Buining 1963; Echinopsis densispina f. chlorogona (Wessner) Buining 1963; Echinopsis densispina f. cinnabarina (Backeb. ex Wessner) Buining 1963; Echinopsis densispina f. citriflora (Wessner) Buining 1963; Echinopsis densispina f. citriniflora (Backeb.) Buining 1963; Echinopsis densispina f. cupreoviridis (Wessner) Buining 1963; Echinopsis densispina f. eburnea (Wessner) Buining 1963; Echinopsis densispina f. haematantha (Backeb.) Buining 1963; Echinopsis densispina f. kraussiana (Backeb.) Buining 1963; Echinopsis densispina var. kreuzingeri (Frič ex Buining) Buining 1963; Echinopsis densispina var. pectinifera (Wessner) J.G.Lamb. 1998; Echinopsis densispina f. pectinifera (Wessner) Buining 1963; Echinopsis densispina f. purpureostoma (Wessner) Buining 1963; Echinopsis densispina var. rebutioides (Backeb.) Buining 1963; Echinopsis densispina f. rubroviridis (Wessner) Buining 1963; Echinopsis densispina f. sanguinea (Wessner) Buining 1963; Echinopsis densispina f. setosa (Backeb.) Buining 1963; Echinopsis densispina f. subcarnea (Wessner) Buining 1963; Echinopsis densispina f. sublimiflora (Backeb.) Buining 1963; Echinopsis densispina f. sufflava (Wessner) Buining 1963; Echinopsis densispina f. versicolor (Wessner) Buining 1963; Echinopsis densispina f. wessneriana (Fritzen) Buining 1963; Echinopsis rebutioides (Backeb.) Friedrich 1974; Echinopsis scoparia Werderm. 1934; Hymenorebutia albolanata Buining 1941; Hymenorebutia chlorogona (Wessner) F.Ritter 1980; Hymenorebutia kreuzingeri Frič ex Buining 1939; Hymenorebutia napina (Pazout) Pazout 1964; Hymenorebutia rebutioides (Backeb.) Buining 1939; Hymenorebutia scoparia (Werderm.) Buining 1939; Hymenorebutia sublimiflora (Backeb.) Buining 1939; Lobivia albicentra (Frič) Y.Itô 1957; Lobivia albolanata (Buining) Krainz (1946; Lobivia chlorogona Wessner 1940; Lobivia chlorogona var. cupreoviridis Wessner 1940; Lobivia chlorogona var. purpureostoma Wessner 1940; Lobivia chlorogona var. rubroviridis Wessner 1940; Lobivia chlorogona var. versicolor Wessner 1940; Lobivia densispina f. albiflora (Wessner) Buining 1963; Lobivia densispina f. albolanata (Buining) Buining 1963; Lobivia densispina f. aurantiaca (Wessner) Buining 1963; Lobivia densispina f. blossfeldii (Wessner) Buining 1963; Lobivia densispina var. blossfeldii Wessner 1940; Lobivia densispina f. chlorogona (Wessner) Buining 1963; Lobivia densispina f. cinnabarina (Backeb. ex Wessner) Buining 1963; Lobivia densispina f. citriflora (Wessner) Buining 1963; Lobivia densispina f. citriniflora (Backeb.) Buining 1963; Lobivia densispina f. cupreoviridis (Wessner) Buining 1963; Lobivia densispina f. eburnea (Wessner) Buining 1963; Lobivia densispina f. haematantha (Backeb.) Buining 1963; Lobivia densispina f. kraussiana (Backeb.) Buining 1963; Lobivia densispina var. kreuzingeri (Frič ex Buining) Buining 1963; Lobivia densispina f. pectinifera (Wessner) Buining 1963; Lobivia densispina f. purpureostoma (Wessner) Buining 1963; Lobivia densispina var. rebutioides (Backeb.) Buining 1963; Lobivia densispina f. rubroviridis (Wessner) Buining 1963; Lobivia densispina var. sanguinea Wessner 1940; Lobivia densispina f. sanguinea (Wessner) Buining 1963; Lobivia densispina f. setosa (Backeb.) Buining 1963; Lobivia densispina f. subcarnea (Wessner) Buining 1963; Lobivia densispina f. sublimiflora (Backeb.) Buining 1963; Lobivia densispina f. sufflava (Wessner) Buining 1963; Lobivia densispina f. versicolor (Wessner) Buining 1963; Lobivia densispina f. wessneriana (Fritzen) Buining 1963; Lobivia famatinensis var. albiflora (Wessner) Krainz 1949; Lobivia famatinensis var. citriflora (Wessner) Krainz 1949; Lobivia famatinensis var. eburnea (Wessner) Krainz 1949; Lobivia famatinensis var. haematantha Backeb. 1936; Lobivia famatinensis var. setosa Backeb. 1956 publ. 1957; Lobivia famatinensis var. subcarnea (Wessner) Krainz 1949; Lobivia famatinensis var. sufflava (Wessner) Krainz 1949; Lobivia haematantha f. chlorogona (Wessner) J.Ullmann 1992; Lobivia haematantha subvar. pectinifera (Wessner) Rausch 1975; Lobivia haematantha f. pectinifera (Wessner) J.Ullmann 1992; Lobivia haematantha var. pectinifera (Wessner) Rausch ex G.D.Rowley 1982; Lobivia haematantha subvar. rebutioides (Backeb.) Rausch 1975; Lobivia haematantha var. rebutioides (Backeb.) Rausch ex G.D.Rowley 1982; Lobivia haematantha f. scoparia (Werderm.) J.Ullmann 1992; Lobivia haematantha f. sublimiflora (Backeb.) J.Ullmann 1990; Lobivia haematantha var. sublimiflora (Backeb.) Rausch ex G.D.Rowley 1982; Lobivia haematantha subvar. sublimiflora (Backeb.) Rausch 1975; Lobivia haematantha f. wessneriana (Fritzen) J.Ullmann 1992; Lobivia kreuzingeri (Frič ex Buining) Krainz 1946; Lobivia napina Pazout 1960; Lobivia pectinifera Wessner 1940; Lobivia pectinifera var. albiflora Wessner 1940; Lobivia pectinifera var. aurantiaca Wessner 1940; Lobivia pectinifera var. cinnabarina Backeb. ex Wessner 1940; Lobivia pectinifera var. citriflora Wessner 1940; Lobivia pectinifera var. eburnea Wessner 1940; Lobivia pectinifera var. haematantha (Backeb.) Wessner 1940; Lobivia pectinifera var. rosiflora Backeb. 1940; Lobivia pectinifera var. subcarnea Wessner 1940; Lobivia pectinifera var. sufflava Wessner 1940; Lobivia purpurea (Frič) Y.Itô 1957; Lobivia rebutioides Backeb. 1934; Lobivia rebutioides var. chlorogona (Wessner) Backeb. 1959; Lobivia rebutioides var. citriniflora Backeb. 1934; Lobivia rebutioides var. kraussiana Backeb. 1949; Lobivia rebutioides var. sublimiflora (Backeb.) Backeb. 1959; Lobivia ruberrima (Frič) Y.Itô 1957; Lobivia scoparia (Werderm.) Werderm. ex Backeb. & F.M.Knuth 1936; Lobivia sublimiflora Backeb. 1935; Lobivia wessneriana Fritzen 1940

= Echinopsis densispina =

Species of cactus

Echinopsis densispina, is a species of Echinopsis cactus found in Argentina.

== Description ==
Echinopsis densispina grows solitary. The egg-shaped, grey-green to dark green shoots reach heights of growth of up to 8 cm (3.1 in) with a diameter of 5.5 centimetres with around 17 notched ribs divided into tubercles. The yellowish-white areoles located on them are sometimes sunken and are up to 0.5 cm (0.20 in) apart. The four to seven central spines are light to dark brown with darker tips. The central spines are straight to slightly curved and thickened at their base and 1.5 to 2 cm (0.59 to 0.79 in) long or much shorter and inconspicuous. The radial spines are 16 to 22 whitish, bristle-like, flexible and 0.6 to 0.8 cm (0.24 to 0.31 in) long. The short and broad, funnel-shaped, yellow to orange flowers are up to 8.5 cm (3.3 in) long

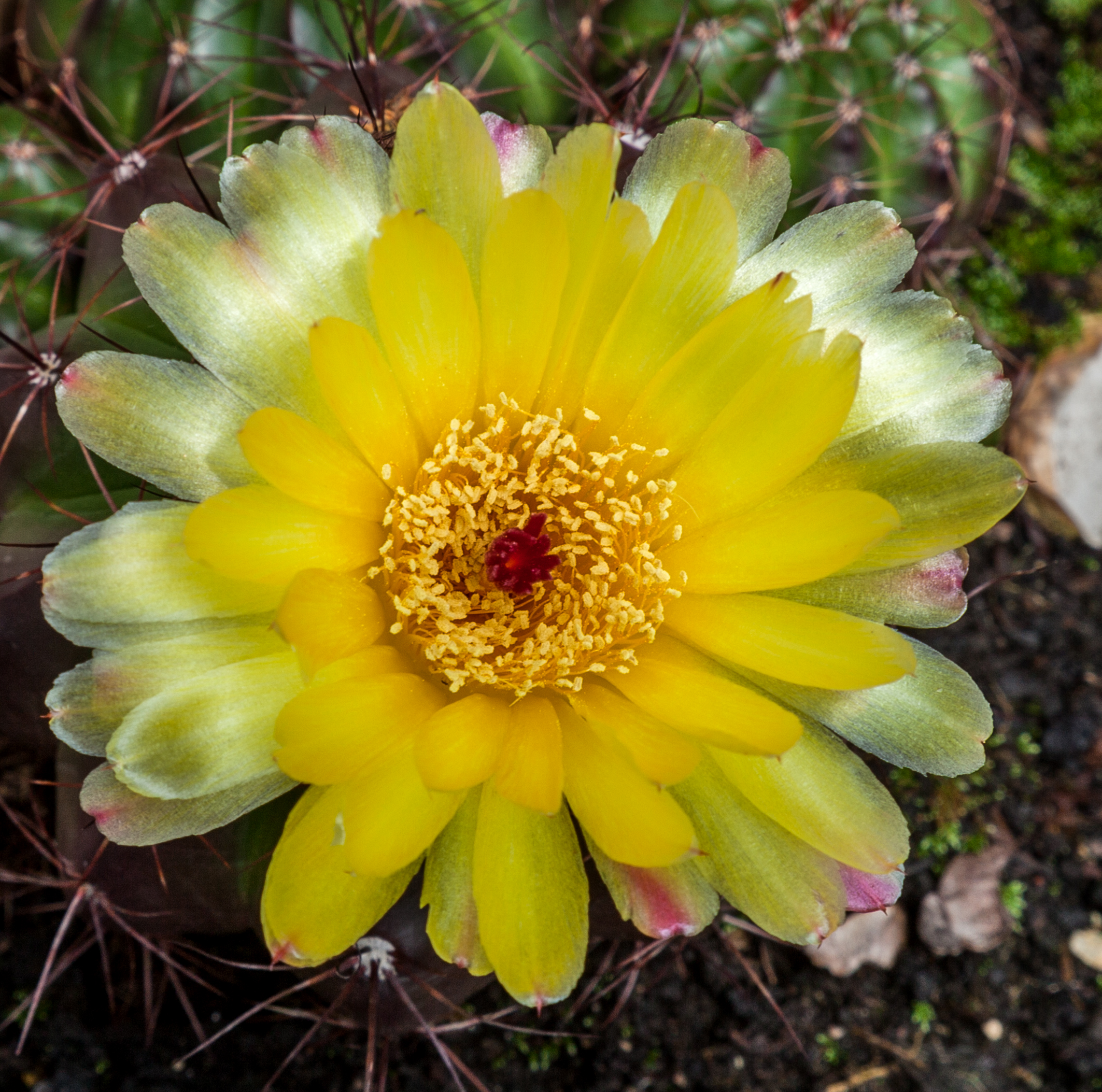
Flower

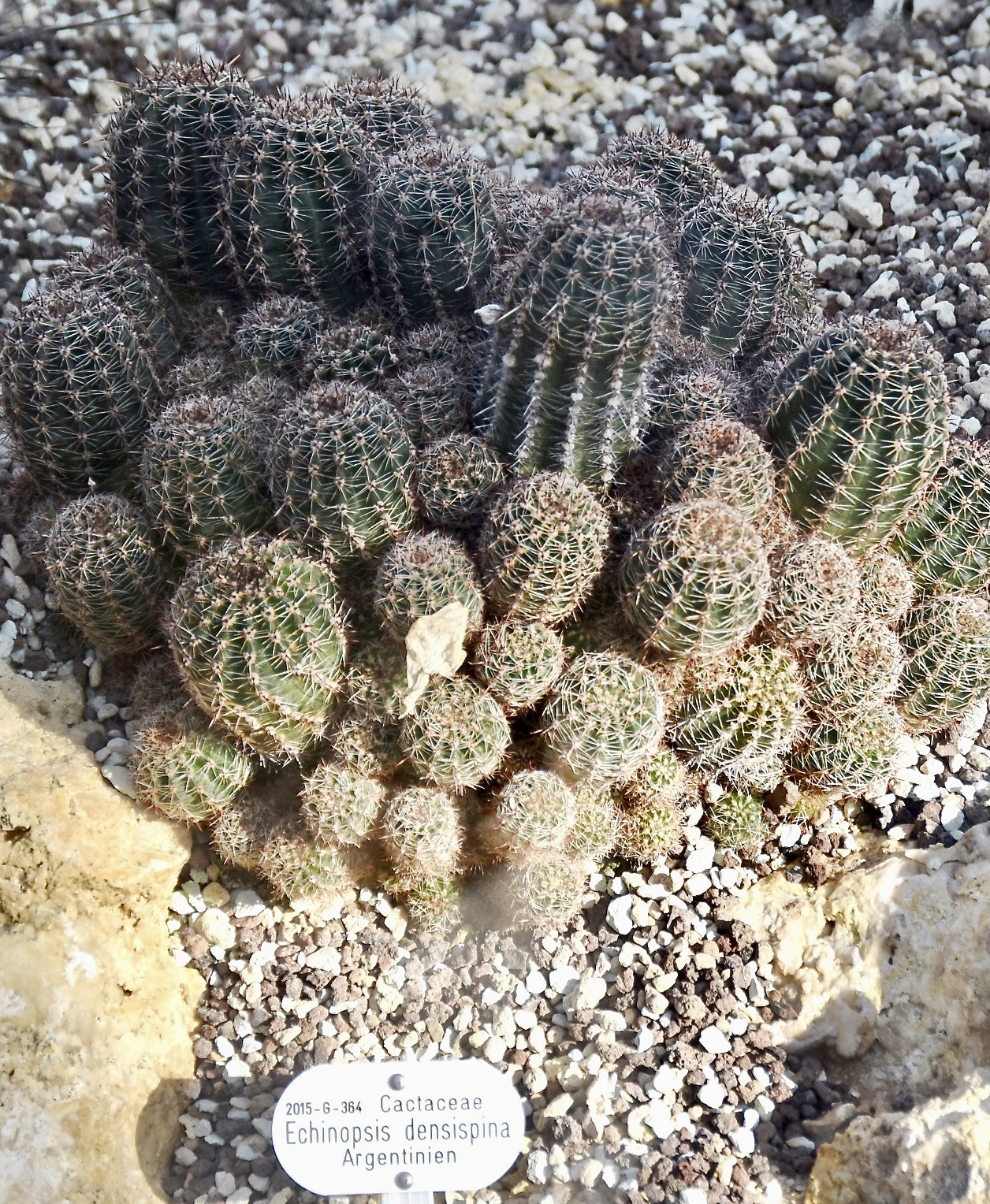
Plant

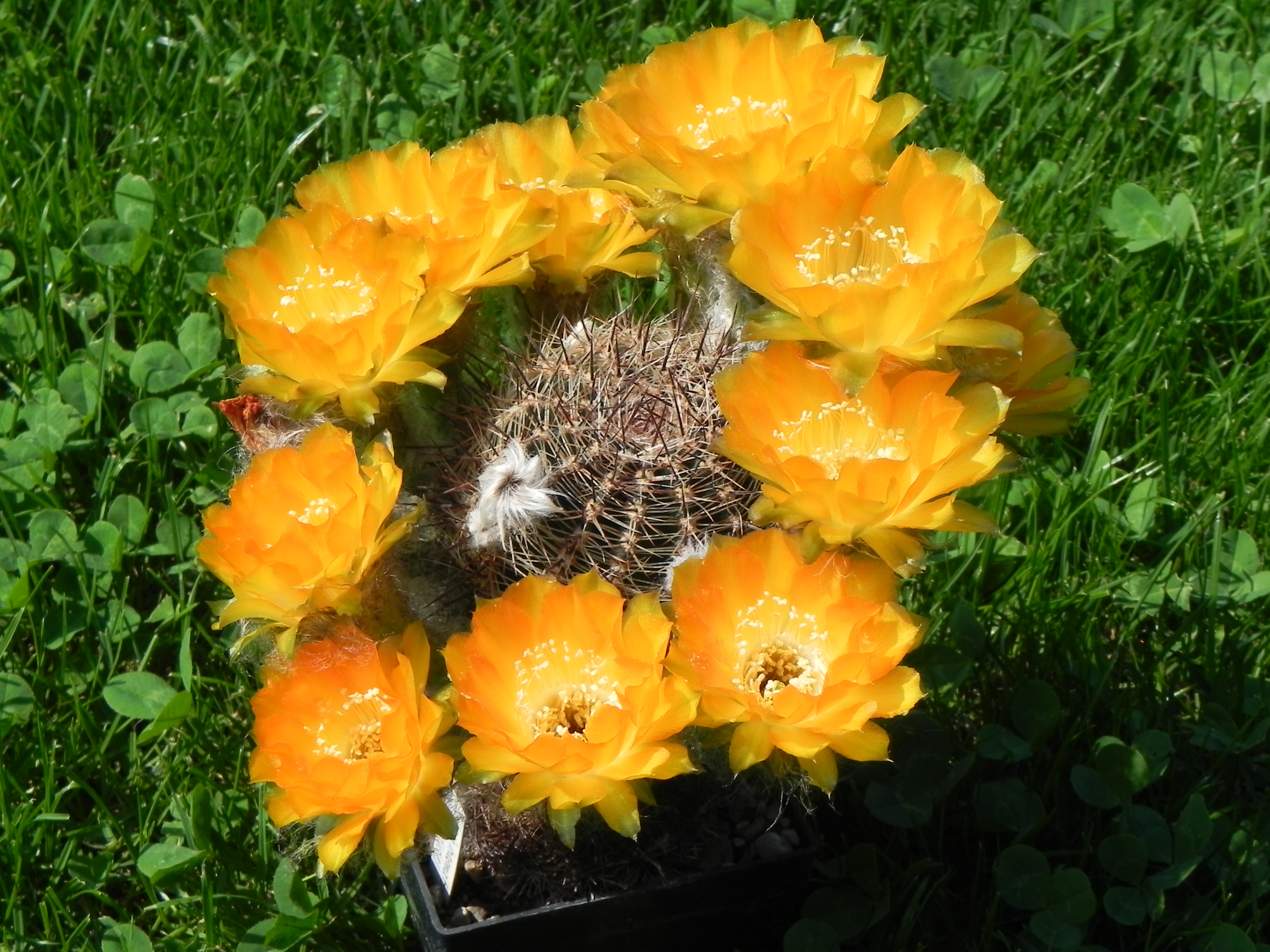

== Distribution ==
Echinopsis densispina is widespread in the Jujuy province of Argentina at altitudes of 1500 to 3000 meters.

== Taxonomy ==
The first description by Erich Werdermann was published in 1934. The specific epithet densispina is derived from the Latin words densus for 'dense' and -spinus for 'thorny'. Nomenclature synonyms are Lobivia densispina Werderm. ex Backeb. & F.M.Knuth (1936), Hymenorebutia densispina (Werderm.) Buining (1939), Salpingolobivia densispina (Werderm.) Y.Itô (1957), Lobivia famatimensis var. densispina (Werderm.) Backeb. (1960), Lobivia haematantha subsp. densispina (Backeb. & F.M.Knuth) Rausch (1975), Lobivia haematantha var. densispina (Backeb. & F.M.Knuth) Rausch (1975) and Lobivia haematantha subsp. densispina (Backeb. & F.M.Knuth) Rausch ex G.D.Rowley (1982).
