= Echinopsis sandiensis =

Scientific classification
- Kingdom: Plantae
- Clade: Tracheophytes
- Clade: Angiosperms
- Clade: Eudicots
- Order: Caryophyllales
- Family: Cactaceae
- Subfamily: Cactoideae
- Genus: Echinopsis
- Species: E. sandiensis

Binomial name
- Echinopsis sandiensis Hoxey

Species of cactus

Echinopsis sandiensis, synonym Soehrensia sandiensis, is a species of Echinopsis found in Peru.
