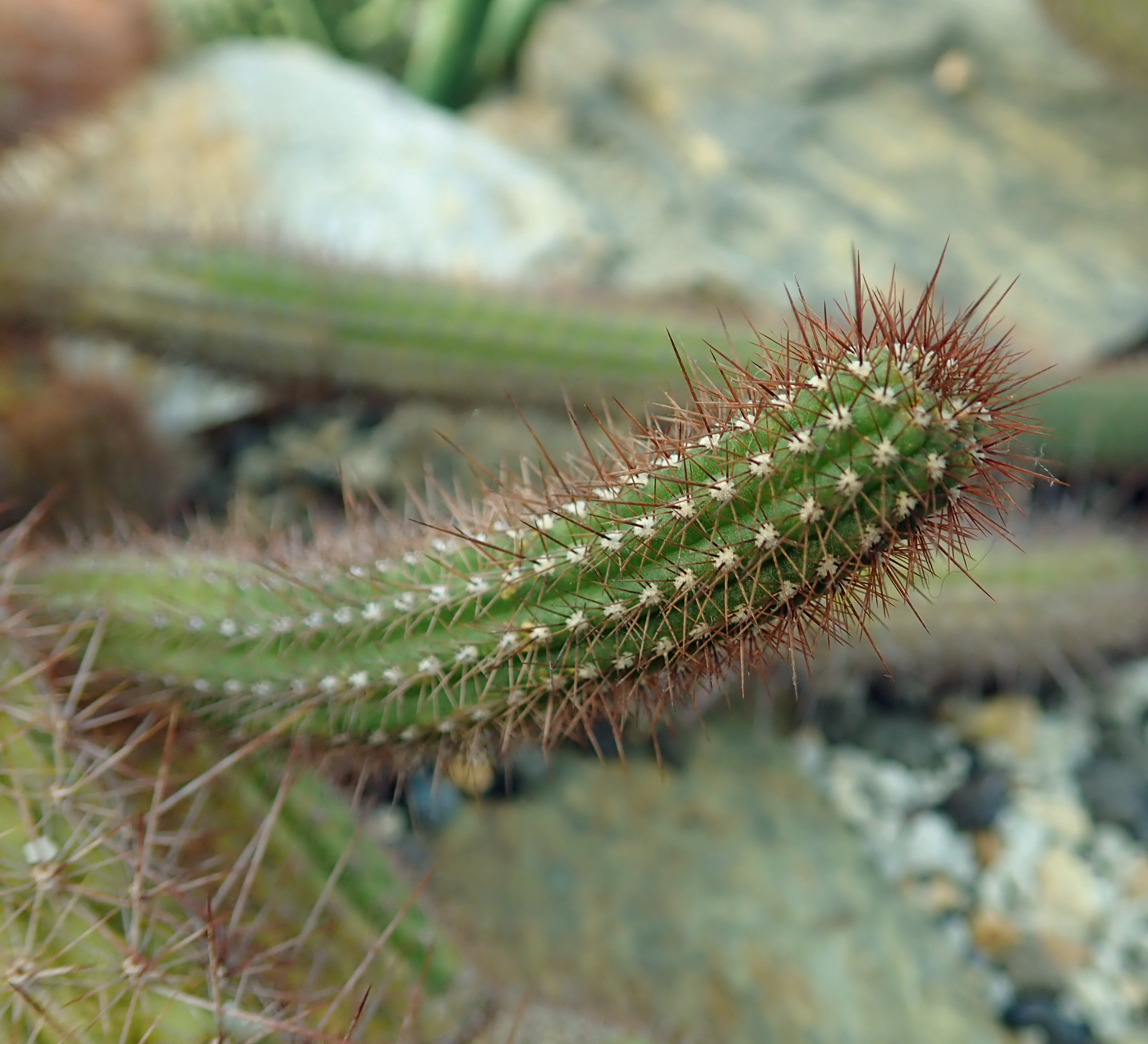

Scientific classification
- Kingdom: Plantae
- Clade: Tracheophytes
- Clade: Angiosperms
- Clade: Eudicots
- Order: Caryophyllales
- Family: Cactaceae
- Subfamily: Cactoideae
- Genus: Echinopsis
- Species: E. vasquezii

Binomial name
- Echinopsis vasquezii (Rausch) G.D.Rowley

Synonyms
- Soehrensia vasquezii (Rausch) Schlumpb.; Trichocereus vasquezii Rausch

= Echinopsis vasquezii =

Species of cacti

Echinopsis vasquezii, synonym Soehrensia vasquezii, is a species of Echinopsis found in Bolivia.
