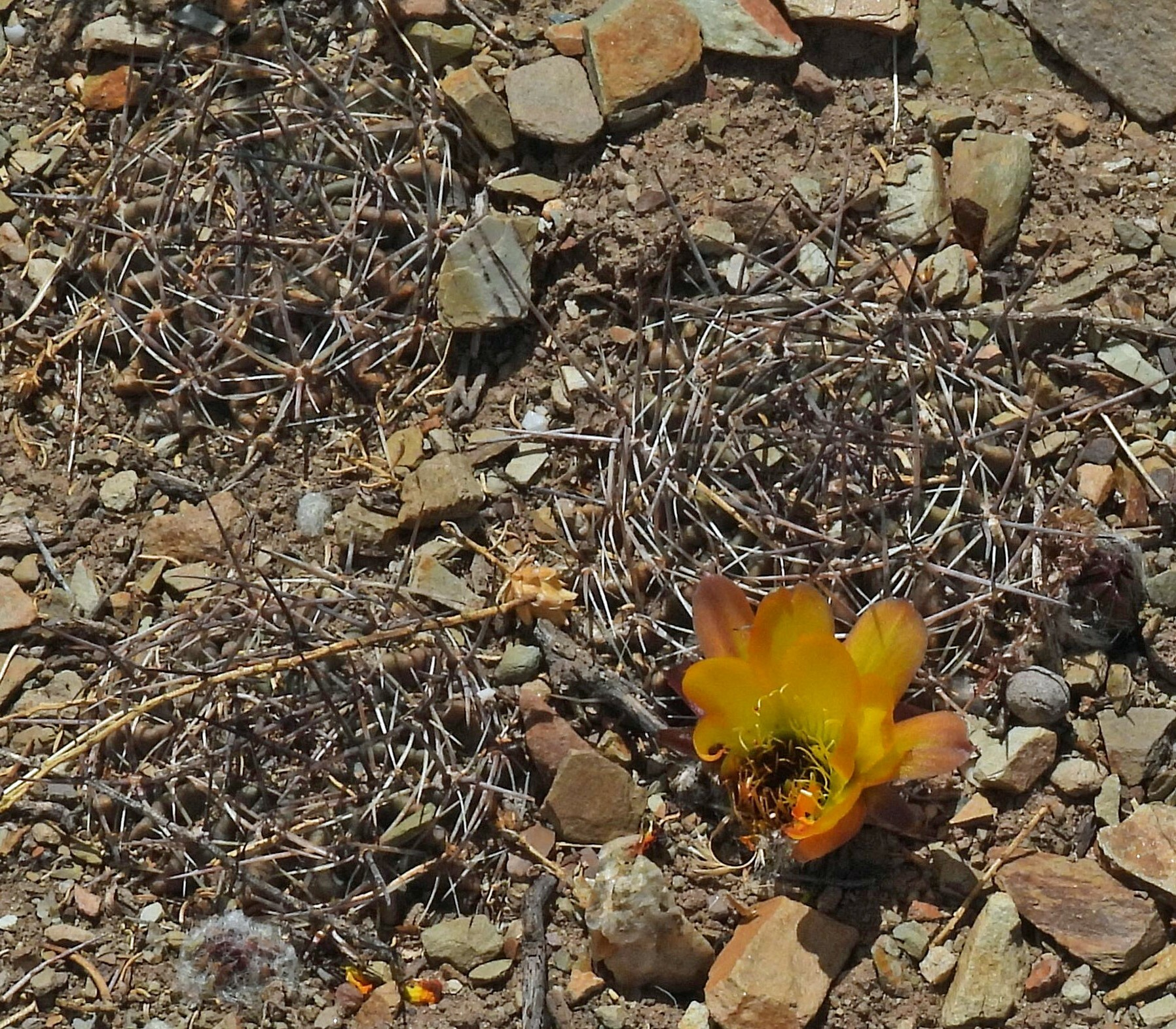
- Echinopsis marsoneri

Conservation status
- Least Concern (IUCN 3.1)

Scientific classification
- Kingdom: Plantae
- Clade: Tracheophytes
- Clade: Angiosperms
- Clade: Eudicots
- Order: Caryophyllales
- Family: Cactaceae
- Subfamily: Cactoideae
- Genus: Echinopsis
- Species: E. marsoneri

Binomial name
- Echinopsis marsoneri Werderm.

Synonyms
- List: Lobivia chrysantha subsp. marsoneri (Werderm.) Rausch 1982; Lobivia chrysantha var. marsoneri (Werderm.) Rausch 1975; Lobivia marsoneri (Werderm.) Backeb. 1936; Andenea gregeri Kreuz. 1835; Lobivia buiningiana F.Ritter 1980; Lobivia chrysantha var. glauca (Rausch) G.D.Rowley 1982; Lobivia chrysantha var. muhriae (Backeb.) G.D.Rowley 1982; Lobivia chrysantha subvar. rubescens (Backeb.) Rausch 1975; Lobivia chrysantha var. rubescens (Backeb.) Rausch 1982; Lobivia chrysantha subvar. vatteri (Krainz) Rausch 1975; Lobivia chrysantha var. vatteri (Krainz) Rausch 1982; Lobivia glauca Rausch 1971; Lobivia haageana Backeb. 1933; Lobivia haageana f. albihepatica (Backeb.) Krainz 1960; Lobivia haageana var. albihepatica Backeb. 1954; Lobivia haageana var. bicolor Backeb. 1956 publ. 1957; Lobivia haageana f. bicolor (Backeb.) Krainz 1960; Lobivia haageana f. chrysantha (Backeb.) Krainz 1960; Lobivia haageana var. chrysantha Backeb. 1954; Lobivia haageana var. cinnabarina Backeb. 1954; Lobivia haageana f. cinnabarina (Backeb.) Krainz 1960; Lobivia haageana f. croceantha (Backeb.) Krainz 1960; Lobivia haageana var. croceantha Backeb. 1956 publ. 1957; Lobivia haageana var. durispina Backeb. 1956 publ. 1957; Lobivia haageana f. durispina (Backeb.) Krainz 1960; Lobivia haageana f. grandiflora-stellata (Backeb.) Krainz 1960; Lobivia haageana var. grandiflora-stellata Backeb. 1956 publ. 1957; Lobivia haageana f. leucoerythrantha (Backeb.) Krainz 1960; Lobivia haageana var. leucoerythrantha Backeb. 1956 publ. 1957; Lobivia iridescens Backeb. 1936; Lobivia jajoana f. buiningiana (F.Ritter) J.Ullmann 1992; Lobivia jajoana var. glauca (Rausch) J.Ullmann 1992; Lobivia jajoana var. nigrostoma (Kreuz. & Buining) Backeb. 1959; Lobivia jajoana var. vatteri (Krainz) J.Ullmann 1990; Lobivia marsoneri var. haageana (Backeb.) J.Ullmann 1992; Lobivia marsoneri var. iridescens (Backeb.) Rausch 1985-1986 publ. 1987; Lobivia marsoneri var. muhriae (Backeb.) J.Ullmann 1992; Lobivia marsoneri var. rubescens (Backeb.) J.Ullmann 1992; Lobivia marsoneri var. uitewaaleana (Buining) J.Ullmann 1992; Lobivia muhriae Backeb. 1963; Lobivia muhriae var. flaviflora Backeb. 1963; Lobivia nigrostoma Kreuz. 1950; Lobivia rubescens Backeb. 1936; Lobivia tuberculosa F.Ritter 1980; Lobivia uitewaaleana Buining 1951; Lobivia vatteri Krainz 1947; Lobivia vatteri var. robusta Backeb. 1956 publ. 1957

= Echinopsis marsoneri =

Species of cactu

Echinopsis marsoneri is a species of cactus from Argentina and Bolivia.

== Description ==
Echinopsis marsoneri usually grows singly and has a short beet root. The spherical, light gray-green shoots reach a diameter of 8 cm (3.1 in) and grow to the same height. There are about 20 compressed ribs arranged in a spiral pattern. The whitish gray to yellowish thorns arising from the areoles are darker at their base. The two to five protruding, often hooked central spines are thickened at their base and up to 7 cm (2.8 in) long. The eight to twelve marginal spines are up to 3 cm (1.2 in) long.

The short, funnel-shaped to bell-shaped, yellow, orange or red flowers have a darker throat. They are 5 to 6 cm (2.0 to 2.4 in) long and have the same diameter. The egg-shaped fruits are semi-dry to sticky.

== Distribution ==
Echinopsis marsoneri is widespread in the Bolivian department of Chuquisaca and the Argentine provinces of Jujuy and Salta at altitudes of 2500 to 4500 meters.

== Taxonomy ==
The first description by Erich Werdermann was published in 1932. The specific epithet marsoneri honors the Argentine cactus collector Oreste Marsoner. Nomenclature synonyms are Lobivia chrysantha subsp. marsoneri (Werderm.) Rausch (1975), Lobivia chrysantha var. marsoneri (Werderm.) Rausch (1975) and Lobivia chrysantha subsp. marsoneri (Werderm.) Rausch ex G.D. Rowley (1982).
