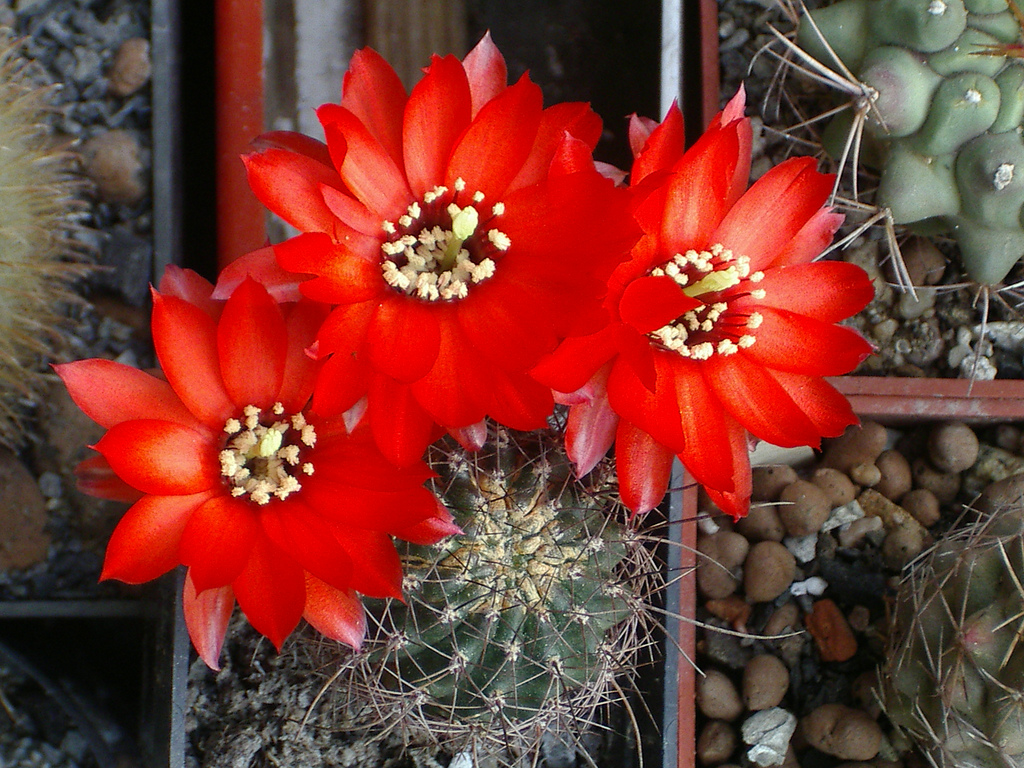

Conservation status
- Least Concern (IUCN 2.3)

Scientific classification
- Kingdom: Plantae
- Clade: Tracheophytes
- Clade: Angiosperms
- Clade: Eudicots
- Order: Caryophyllales
- Family: Cactaceae
- Subfamily: Cactoideae
- Genus: Echinopsis
- Species: E. saltensis

Binomial name
- Echinopsis saltensis Speg.

Synonyms
- List: Chamaecereus saltensis (Speg.) Schlumpb.; Echinocactus saltensis Speg.; Echinopsis nealeana (Backeb.) Friedrich; Echinopsis pseudocachensis (Backeb.) Friedrich; Echinopsis saltensis var. nealeana (Backeb.) J.G.Lamb.; Echinopsis saltensis var. pseudocachensis (Backeb.) J.G.Lamb.; Hymenorebutia nealeana (Backeb.) Buining; Hymenorebutia pseudocachensis (Backeb.) Buining; Lobivia cachensis Britton & Rose; Lobivia emmae var. brevispina Backeb.; Lobivia emmae Backeb. ex Spine; Lobivia emmae Backeb.; Lobivia nealeana Backeb.; Lobivia nealeana var. grandiflora Y.Itô; Lobivia nealeana var. purpureiflora Y.Itô; Lobivia pseudocachensis Backeb.; Lobivia pseudocachensis var. cinnabarina Backeb.; Lobivia pseudocachensis var. sanguinea Backeb.; Lobivia saltensis Britton & Rose; Lobivia saltensis f. emmae (Backeb.) J.Ullmann; Lobivia saltensis var. emmae (Backeb.) G.D.Rowley; Lobivia saltensis var. multicostata Rausch; Lobivia saltensis var. nealeana (Backeb.) Rausch; Lobivia saltensis var. pseudocachensis (Backeb.) Rausch; Lobivia saltensis var. zapallarensis Rausch

= Echinopsis saltensis =

Species of cactus

Echinopsis saltensis, synonym Chamaecereus saltensis, is a species of cactus from northwestern Argentina.

== Description ==
Echinopsis saltensis is generally found growing as an individual plant, developing clusters with a robust taproot. The light green shoots, varying from spherical to short cylindrical, can attain a diameter of up to 9 cm (3.5 in). These shoots display 17 to 18 ribs adorned with flat tubercles. The areoles, situated closely along the ribs, contain one to four robust central spines, typically curved, measuring 1 to 1.2 cm (0.39 to 0.47 in) in length. Additionally, there are twelve to fourteen radial spines, thinner than the central spines, with a length of up to 6 mm (0.24 in).

The red, funnel-shaped flowers, darker towards the center, blossom on the sides of the shoots and unfurl during daylight hours. These flowers can extend to a length of up to 4 cm (1.6 in). The spherical fruits, measuring up to 5 mm (0.20 in) in diameter.

== Taxonomy ==
Carlo Luigi Spegazzini initially described the species as Echinopsis saltensis in 1905. The specific epithet saltensis denotes its occurrence in the Argentine province of Salta. In 2012, Boris O. Schlumpberger reclassified the species under the genus Chamaecereus. When Chamaecereus was made a synonym of Echinopsis, the species returned to its original name.

== Distribution ==
Echinopsis saltensis is found in the Argentina provinces of Salta and Tucumán, at elevations ranging from 1200 to 2400 meters growing in shrublands on clay soils.
