= Echinopsis serpentina =

Scientific classification
- Kingdom: Plantae
- Clade: Tracheophytes
- Clade: Angiosperms
- Clade: Eudicots
- Order: Caryophyllales
- Family: Cactaceae
- Subfamily: Cactoideae
- Genus: Echinopsis
- Species: E. serpentina

Binomial name
- Echinopsis serpentina M.Lowry & M.Mend.

Synonyms
- Soehrensia serpentina (M.Lowry & M.Mend.) Schlumpb.; Trichocereus serpentinus (M.Lowry & M.Mend.) Guiggi

Species of cacti

Echinopsis serpentina, synonym Soehrensia serpentina, is a species of Echinopsis found in Peru and Bolivia.
