= Echinopsis ayopayana =

Scientific classification
- Kingdom: Plantae
- Clade: Tracheophytes
- Clade: Angiosperms
- Clade: Eudicots
- Order: Caryophyllales
- Family: Cactaceae
- Subfamily: Cactoideae
- Genus: Echinopsis
- Species: E. ayopayana

Binomial name
- Echinopsis ayopayana F.Ritter & Rausch

Synonyms
- Echinopsis kladiwaiana Rausch; Lobivia ayopayana (F.Ritter & Rausch) Schlumpb.

Species of cactus

Echinopsis ayopayana is a species of flowering plant in the cactus family Cactaceae, native to Bolivia. It was first described in 1968.
