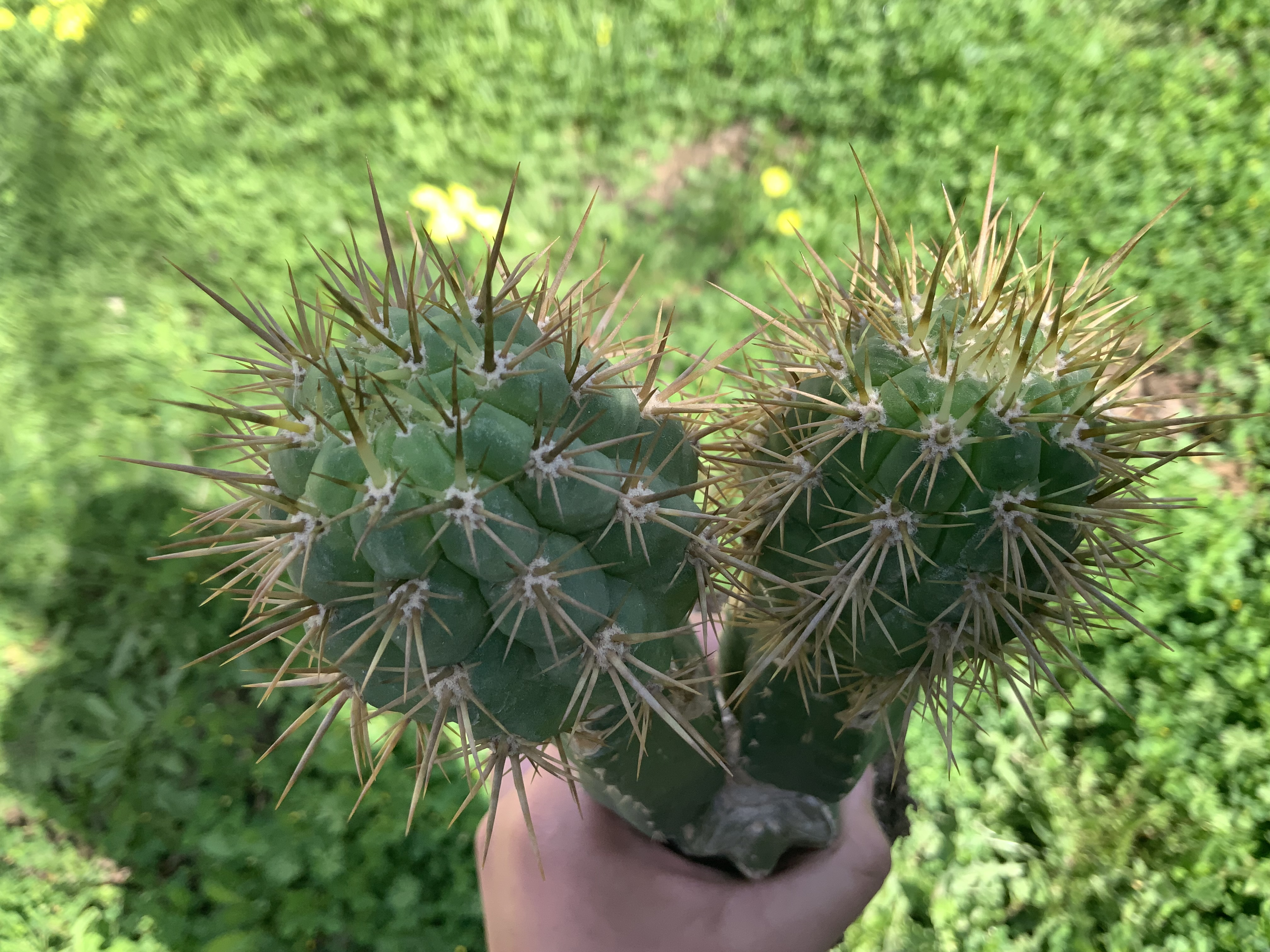

Scientific classification
- Kingdom: Plantae
- Clade: Tracheophytes
- Clade: Angiosperms
- Clade: Eudicots
- Order: Caryophyllales
- Family: Cactaceae
- Subfamily: Cactoideae
- Genus: Echinopsis
- Species: E. spinibarbis

Binomial name
- Echinopsis spinibarbis (Otto ex Pfeiff.) A.E.Hoffm.

Synonyms
- Cereus spinibarbis Otto ex Pfeiff.; Echinocereus spinibarbis (Otto ex Pfeiff.) K.Schum.; Eulychnia spinibarbis (Otto ex Pfeiff.) Britton & Rose; Trichocereus spinibarbis (Otto ex Pfeiff.) F.Ritter

= Echinopsis spinibarbis =

Species of cactus

Echinopsis spinibarbis, or quisco, is a species of cactus found in Chile.

== Description ==
Echinopsis spinibarbis is a compact shrub with a typical height of 80 cm (31 in) and slightly arched cylindrical stems that are 6 cm (2.4 in) in diameter. The plant has 9 obtuse ribs, each 1 cm (0.39 in) wide with round and obovate yellow or gray areoles measuring 5 mm (0.20 in) in height and 1 cm (0.39 in) in width. The stems have 4 central spines, 2–12 cm (4.7 in) long, light gray in color with black tips, arranged in a crosswise pattern. Additionally, there are 10-22 radial spines measuring 1-1.5 cm (0.59 in) in length, light gray in color with brown tips. The flowers, 13 cm (5.1 in) long, have ovaries and floral tubes covered in black hairs. The round fruits are 4 cm (1.6 in) in length, containing seeds that are 1.5 mm (0.059 in) long and 1 mm (0.039 in) wide.

== Distribution ==
Indigenous to Chile, Echinopsis spinibarbis is specifically found in Region II of Antofagasta and Region III of Atacama, at elevations around 200 meters.
