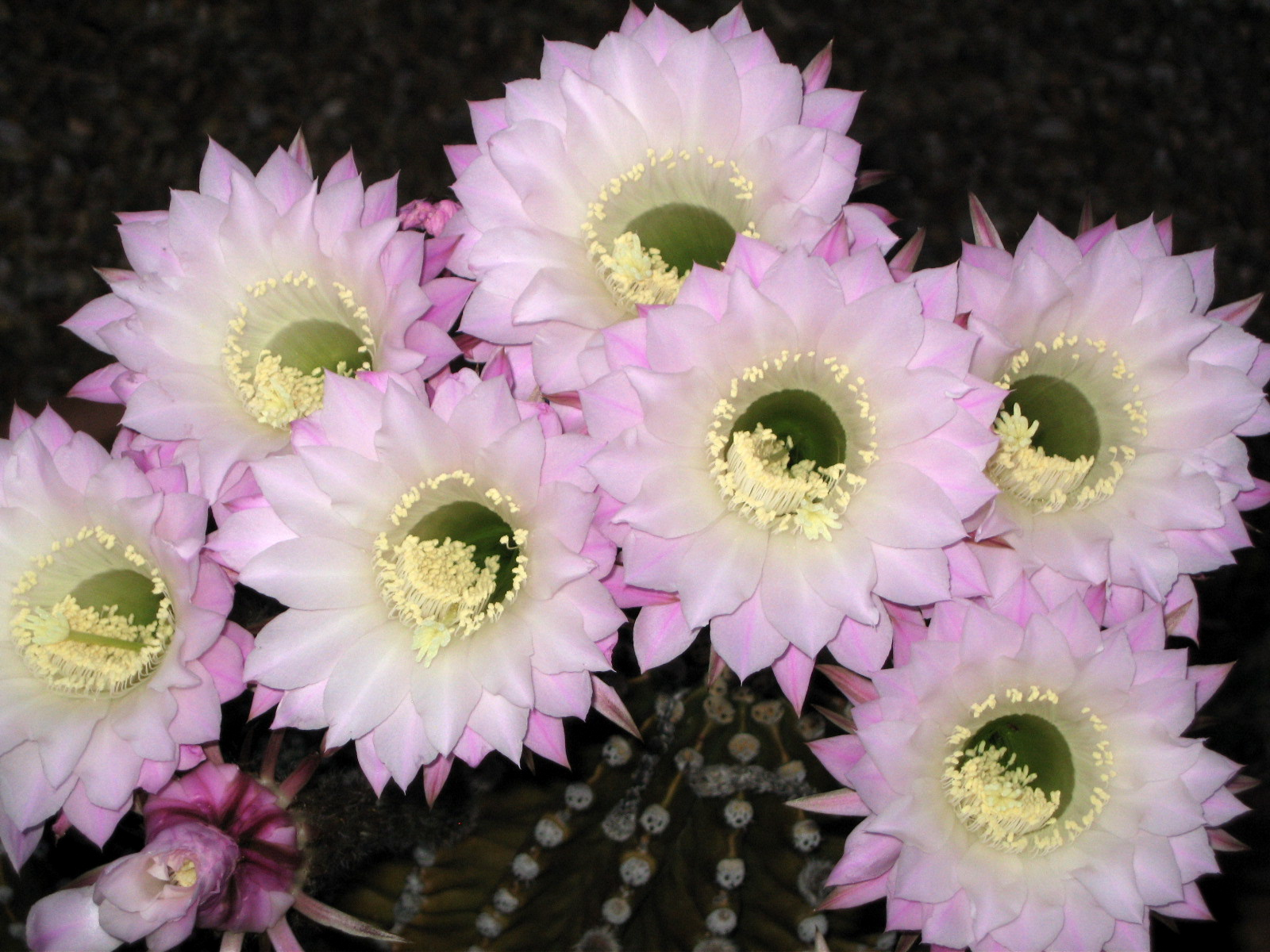
- Echinopsis oxygona

Scientific classification
- Kingdom: Plantae
- Clade: Tracheophytes
- Clade: Angiosperms
- Clade: Eudicots
- Order: Caryophyllales
- Family: Cactaceae
- Subfamily: Cactoideae
- Tribe: Cereeae
- Subtribe: Trichocereinae
- Genus: Echinopsis; Zucc.

Type species
- Echinopsis eyriesii, now Echinopsis oxygona

Species
- See text.

Synonyms
- Acantholobivia Backeb.; Andenea Kreuz.; Aureilobivia Frič ex Kreuz., not validly publ.; Chamaecereus Britton & Rose; Cinnabarinea Frič ex F.Ritter; Cosmantha Y.Itô; × Cosmopsis Y.Itô; Echinonyctanthus Lem.; Furiolobivia Y.Itô; Helianthocereus Backeb.; Hymenorebulobivia Frič ex Kreuz., not validly publ.; Hymenorebutia Frič ex Buining; Lobivia Britton & Rose; Lobiviopsis Frič ex Kreuz., not validly publ.; Megalobivia Y.Itô, not validly publ.; Mesechinopsis Y.Itô; Neolobivia Y.Itô; Pilopsis Y.Itô, not validly publ.; Pseudolobivia (Backeb.) Backeb.; Salpingolobivia Y.Itô; × Salpingolobiviopsis Y.Itô; Scoparebutia Frič & Kreuz. ex Buining; Soehrensia Backeb.; Trichocereus (A.Berger) Riccob.

= Echinopsis =

Genus of cacti

Echinopsis is a genus of cacti native to South America, sometimes known as hedgehog cactus, sea-urchin cactus or Easter lily cactus. As of November 2025, Plants of the World Online used a broad circumscription of the genus, resulting in about 80 accepted species, ranging from large and treelike types to small globose cacti. The name derives from echinos hedgehog or sea urchin, and opsis appearance, a reference to these plants' dense coverings of spines.

They are known for their big size, length of tube, and beauty of their flowers, borne upon generally small and dumpy stems.

== Taxonomy ==
Studies in the 1970s and 1980s resulted in several formerly separate genera being absorbed into Echinopsis. When very broadly circumscribed, Echinopsis sensu lato included over 100 species. Some genera have been absorbed and then accepted again. For example, the genus name Trichocereus was given to a number of columnar cacti in 1909 by Vincenzo Riccobono. The genus was subsumed into Echinopsis in 1974 by Friedrich, along with Lobivia. In 2011, it was argued that Trichocereus was distinct from Echinopsis, and a 2012 genetic and morphological study by Albesiano found Trichocereus to be monophyletic if it included three species of Harrisia.

A 2012 genetic analysis of chloroplast DNA indicated Echinopsis was made up of several divergent lineages. This was shown again in 2019. It was concluded that previous taxonomic confusion was due to convergent evolution: species in different lineages had evolved to have similar growth and/or to share pollinators.

As of October 2025, Plants of the World Online subsumed Soehrensia, Chamaecereus, Trichocereus, and Lobivia into Echinopsis, resulting in a genus of around 80 species.

=== Species ===
Species of Echinopsis accepted by Plants of the World Online as of September 2026:

Image	Scientific name	Distribution
	Echinopsis albispinosa K.Schum. (including E. silvestrii)	Argentina
	Echinopsis ancistrophora Speg.	
	Echinopsis angelesiae (R.Kiesling) G.D.Rowley	
	Echinopsis arachnacantha (Buining & F.Ritter) Friedrich	
	Echinopsis arboricola (Kimnach) Mottram	
	Echinopsis aurea Britton & Rose	Argentina
	Echinopsis ayopayana F.Ritter & Rausch	
	Echinopsis backebergii Werderm.	
	Echinopsis breviflora (Backeb.) M.Lowry	Argentina (Salta)
	Echinopsis bridgesii Salm-Dyck	
	Echinopsis bruchii (Britton & Rose) H.Friedrich & Glaetzle	
	Echinopsis caineana (Cárdenas) D.R.Hunt	
	Echinopsis calochlora K.Schum. (including E. hammerschmidii)	Bolivia to Brazil (Mato Grosso do Sul)
	Echinopsis calorubra Cárdenas	
	Echinopsis camarguensis (Cárdenas) H.Friedrich & G.D.Rowley	
	Echinopsis candicans (Gillies ex Salm-Dyck) D.R.Hunt	
	Echinopsis cardenasiana (Rausch) Friedrich	
	Echinopsis caulescens (F.Ritter) M.Lowry	
	Echinopsis chalaensis (Rauh & Backeb.) H.Friedrich & G.D.Rowley (sometimes in Trichocereus)	Peru
	Echinopsis chamaecereus H.Friedrich & Glaetzle	
	Echinopsis chrysantha Werderm.	Argentina
	Echinopsis chrysochete Werderm.	
	Echinopsis cinnabarina (Hook.) Labour.	
	Echinopsis clavata (F.Ritter) D.R.Hunt (sometimes in Trichocereus)	Bolivia
	Echinopsis crassicaulis (R.Kiesling) H.Friedrich & Glaetzle	
	Echinopsis cuzcoensis (Britton & Rose) H.Friedrich & G.D.Rowley (sometimes in Trichocereus)	Peru
	Echinopsis densispina Werderm.	Argentina
	Echinopsis ferox (Britton & Rose) Backeb.	
	Echinopsis formosa (Pfeiff.) Jacobi ex Salm-Dyck	
	Echinopsis friedrichii G.D.Rowley	
	Echinopsis haematantha (Speg.) D.R.Hunt	Argentina and Bolivia
	Echinopsis hahniana (Backeb.) R.S.Wallace	
	Echinopsis hertrichiana (Backeb.) D.R.Hunt	
	Echinopsis huascha (F.A.C.Weber) H.Friedrich & G.D.Rowley	
	Echinopsis jajoana (Backeb.) Blossf. (including E. sanguiniflora)	Argentina
	Echinopsis lageniformis (C.F.Först.) H.Friedrich & G.D.Rowley (sometimes in Trichocereus)	Bolivia
	Echinopsis lateritia Gürke	
	Echinopsis luisramirezii (Lodé & F.Carlier) M.H.J.van der Meer	
	Echinopsis macrogona (Salm-Dyck) H.Friedrich & G.D.Rowley	
	Echinopsis mamillosa Gürke	
	Echinopsis marsoneri Werderm.	Bolivia to Argentina (Jujuy, Salta)
	Echinopsis maximiliana Heyder ex A.Dietr.	
	Echinopsis minutiflora (Rausch) M.Lowry	
	Echinopsis narvaecensis (Cárdenas) H.Friedrich & G.D.Rowley	Southern Bolivia
	Echinopsis obrepanda (Salm-Dyck) K.Schum.	
	Echinopsis oligotricha (Cárdenas) M.Lowry	Bolivia
	Echinopsis oxygona (Link) Zucc. ex Pfeiff. & Otto (including E. adolfofriedrichii, E. brasiliensis, E. eyriesii, E. tubiflora)	Brazil, Uruguay and northern Argentina
	Echinopsis pachanoi (Britton & Rose) H.Friedrich & G.D.Rowley	
	Echinopsis pampana (Britton & Rose) D.R.Hunt	
	Echinopsis pamparuizii Cárdenas	
	Echinopsis pentlandii (Hook.) Salm-Dyck ex A.Dietr.	
	Echinopsis pereziensis Cárdenas	
	Echinopsis pugionacantha Rose & Boed.	
	Echinopsis quadratiumbonata (F.Ritter) D.R.Hunt	
	Echinopsis rauschii Friedrich	Bolivia (Cochabamba)
	Echinopsis rojasii Cárdenas	Bolivia
	Echinopsis saltensis Speg.	
	Echinopsis sandiensis Hoxey	
	Echinopsis schickendantzii F.A.C.Weber	
	Echinopsis schieliana (Backeb.) D.R.Hunt	
	Echinopsis schreiteri (A.Cast.) Werderm.	
	Echinopsis serpentina M.Lowry & M.Mend.	
	Echinopsis smrziana Backeb.	
	Echinopsis spachiana (Lem.) H.Friedrich & G.D.Rowley	
	Echinopsis spinibarbis (Otto ex Pfeiff.) A.E.Hoffm.	
	Echinopsis stilowiana (Backeb.) J.G.Lamb.	
	Echinopsis strigosa (Salm-Dyck) H.Friedrich & G.D.Rowley	
	Echinopsis sucrensis Cárdenas	
	Echinopsis tacaquirensis (Vaupel) H.Friedrich & G.D.Rowley	Bolivia
	Echinopsis tarijensis (Vaupel) H.Friedrich & G.D.Rowley	
	Echinopsis tegeleriana (Backeb.) D.R.Hunt	
	Echinopsis thelegona (F.A.C.Weber) H.Friedrich & G.D.Rowley	
	Echinopsis thelegonoides (Speg.) H.Friedrich & G.D.Rowley	
	Echinopsis tiegeliana (Wessner) D.R.Hunt	
	Echinopsis torrefluminensis M.Lowry	Bolivia
	Echinopsis uyupampensis (Backeb.) H.Friedrich & G.D.Rowley	
	Echinopsis vasquezii (Rausch) G.D.Rowley	
	Echinopsis volliana (Backeb.) H.Friedrich & G.D.Rowley	
	Echinopsis walteri (R.Kiesling) H.Friedrich & Glaetzle	
	Echinopsis werdermannii Frič ex Fleisch. (sometimes in E. oxygona)	Paraguay
	Echinopsis yuquina D.R.Hunt	

In addition, many hybrids exist, mostly between similar species, such as the cross between Echinopsis pachanoi (formerly Trichocereus macrogonus var. pachanoi) and E. eyriesii (now E. oxygona) which was sold under the name "Trichopsis pachaniesii" by Sacred Succulents.

== Distribution ==
Echinopsis species are native to South America (Argentina, Bolivia, Peru, Brazil, Paraguay and Uruguay). They thrive in desert grasslands, shrubland, and in situations where the soil is sandy or gravelly, such as the sides of hills in the crevices of rocks.

== Cultivation ==
Time-lapse video of a blooming echinopsis

The growing and resting seasons for Echinopsis are the same as for Echinocactus. Research by J. Smith (former Curator at the Royal Botanic Gardens, Kew) showed that species like the Chilean Echinopsis cristata and its Mexican relatives thrive if potted in light loam, with a little leaf mould and a few nodules of limestone. The limestone keeps the soil open; it is important that the soil should be well drained.

== Gallery ==
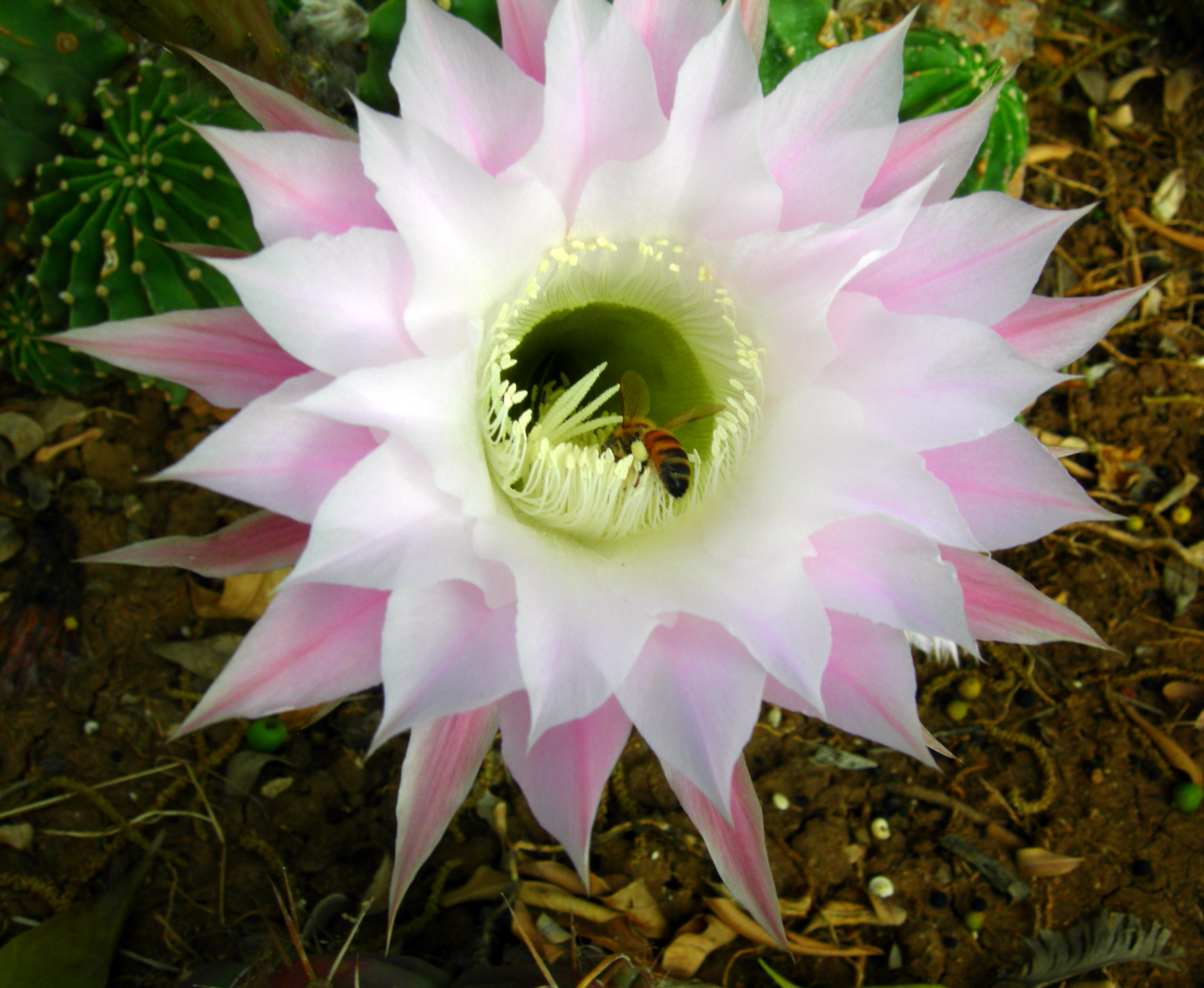
Echinopsis oxygona visited by a European honeybee; Kfar Blum Kibbutz garden, Israel.

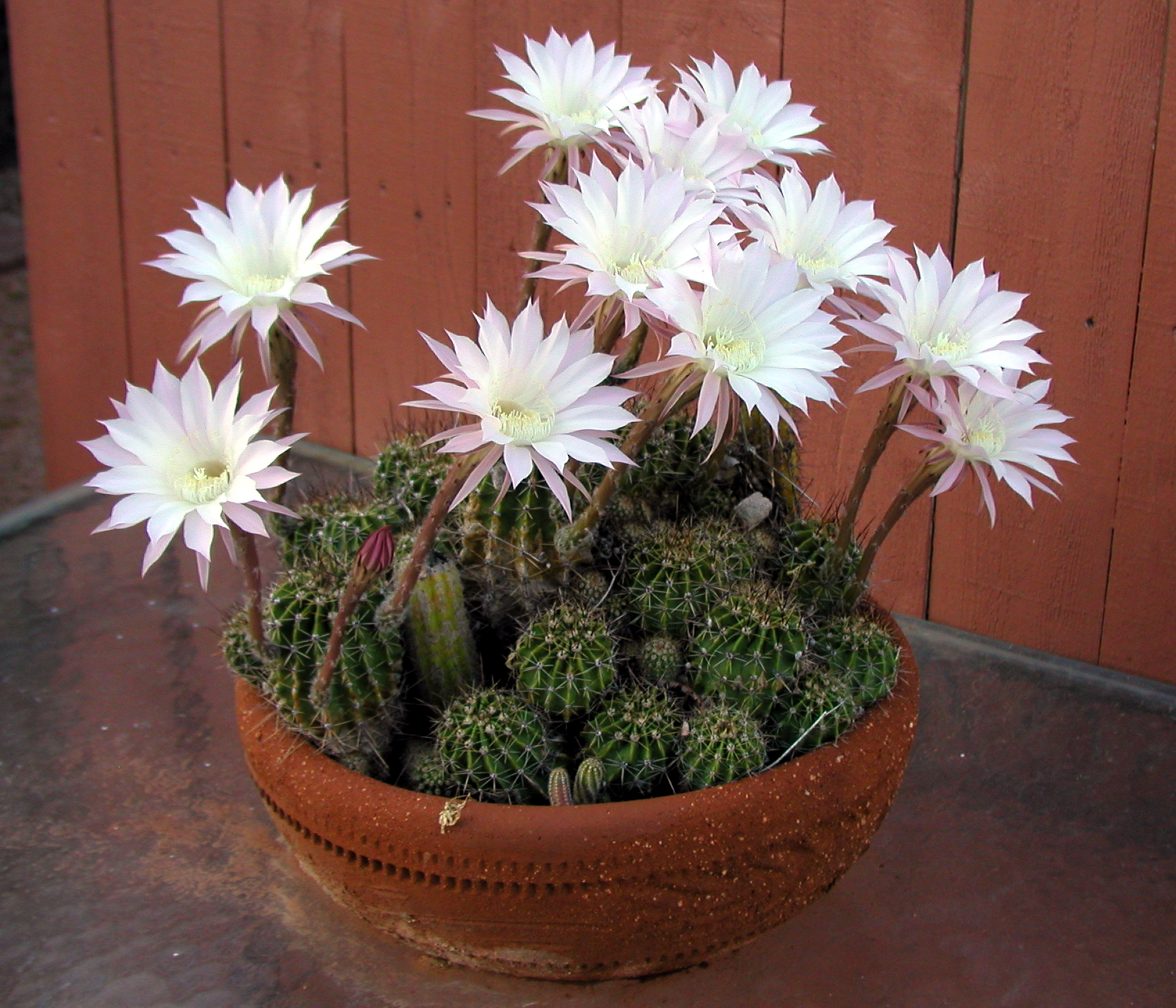
Echinopsis oxygona

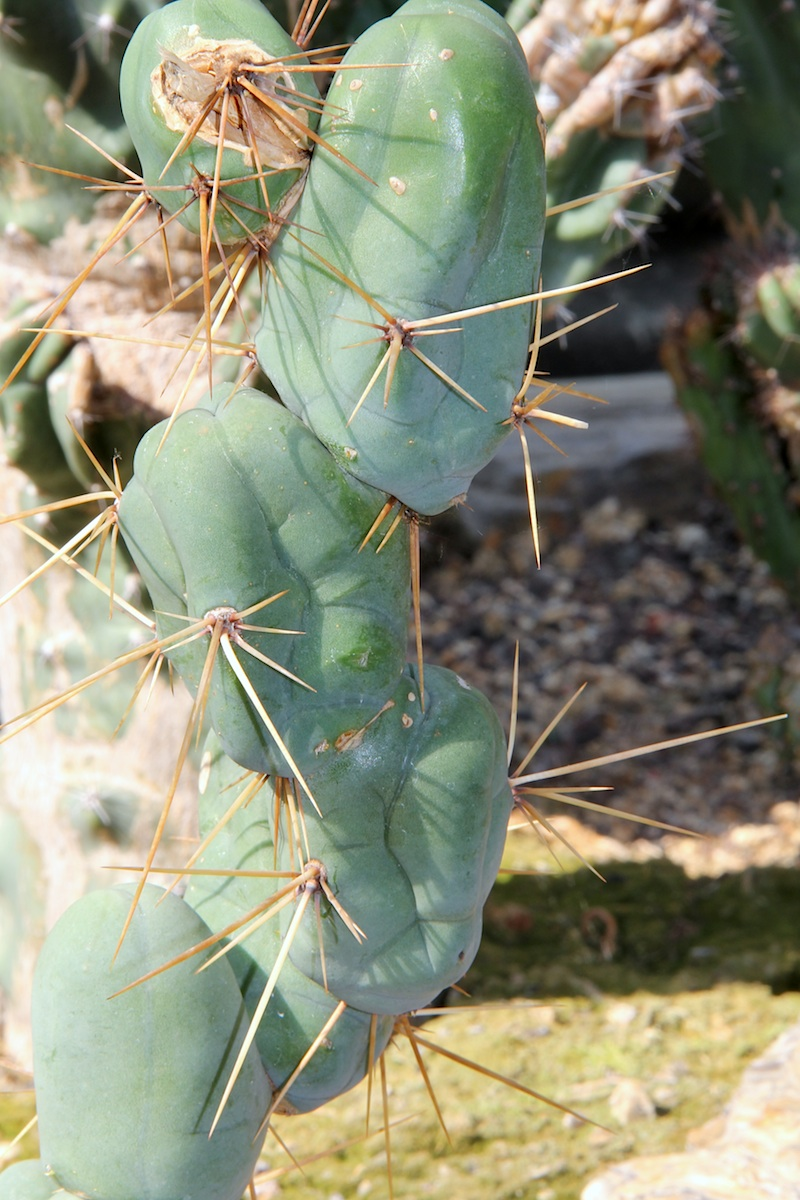
Echinopsis lageniformis monstrose short form

== Bibliography ==
- Edward F. Anderson, The Cactus Family (Timber Press, 2001) ISBN 0-88192-498-9, pp. 255–286
- K. Trout, Trout's Notes on San Pedro & related Trichocereus species (Sacred Cacti 3rd ed. Part B) (Moksha Press, 2005) ISBN 0-9770876-0-3
