= Lobivia =

Former genus of cacti

Lobivia is a formerly recognized genus of cacti native to South America from Bolivia, Peru to northwestern Argentina and Northern Chile. As of November 2025, it was considered by Plants of the World Online to be a synonym of the genus Echinopsis.

== Taxonomy ==
The genus Lobivia was established by Nathaniel Lord Britton and Joseph Nelson Rose in 1922. Its status as an independent genus has varied. In the CITES Cactaceae Checklists prior to 2016, it was treated as a synonym of Echinopsis. In the 3rd edition of 2016, it was restored as an independent genus based on a 2012 phylogenetic study. A major 2025 classification of the family Cactaceae returned Lobivia to a synonym of Echinopsis, a view accepted by Plants of the World Online as of November 2025.

=== Species ===
Species previously placed in the genus Lobivia include:

- Lobivia ancistrophora (Speg.) Schlumpb. → Echinopsis ancistrophora
- Lobivia arachnacantha Buining & F.Ritter → Echinopsis arachnacantha
- Lobivia ayopayana (F.Ritter & Rausch) Schlumpb. → Echinopsis ayopayana
- Lobivia backebergii (Werderm.) Blatt. → Echinopsis backebergii
- Lobivia bridgesii (Salm-Dyck) Schlumpb. → Echinopsis bridgesii
- Lobivia caineana Cárdenas → Echinopsis caineana
- Lobivia calorubra (Cárdenas) Rausch → Echinopsis calorubra
- Lobivia cardenasiana Rausch → Echinopsis cardenasiana
- Lobivia chrysochete (Werderm.) Wessner → Echinopsis chrysochete
- Lobivia cinnabarina (Hook.) Britton & Rose → Echinopsis cinnabarina
- Lobivia ferox Britton & Rose → Echinopsis ferox
- Lobivia hertrichiana Backeb. → Echinopsis hertrichiana
- Lobivia lateritia (Gürke) Britton & Rose → Echinopsis lateritia
- Lobivia mamillosa (Gürke) Schlumpb. → Echinopsis mamillosa
- Lobivia maximiliana (Heyder ex A.Dietr.) Backeb. ex Rausch → Echinopsis maximiliana
- Lobivia minutiflora (Rausch) Schlumpb. & M.Lowry → Echinopsis minutiflora
- Lobivia obrepanda (Salm-Dyck) Schlumpb. → Echinopsis obrepanda
- Lobivia pampana Britton & Rose → Echinopsis pampana
- Lobivia pamparuizii (Cárdenas) Schlumpb. → Echinopsis pamparuizii
- Lobivia pentlandii (Hook.) Britton & Rose → Echinopsis pentlandii
- Lobivia pereziensis (Cárdenas) Lodé → Echinopsis pereziensis
- Lobivia pugionacantha (Rose & Boed.) Backeb. → Echinopsis pugionacantha
- Lobivia rauschii Zecher → Echinopsis yuquina
- Lobivia schieliana Backeb. → Echinopsis schieliana
- Lobivia sucrensis (Cárdenas) Lodé → Echinopsis sucrensis
- Lobivia tegeleriana Backeb. → Echinopsis tegeleriana
- Lobivia tiegeliana Wessner → Echinopsis tiegeliana
