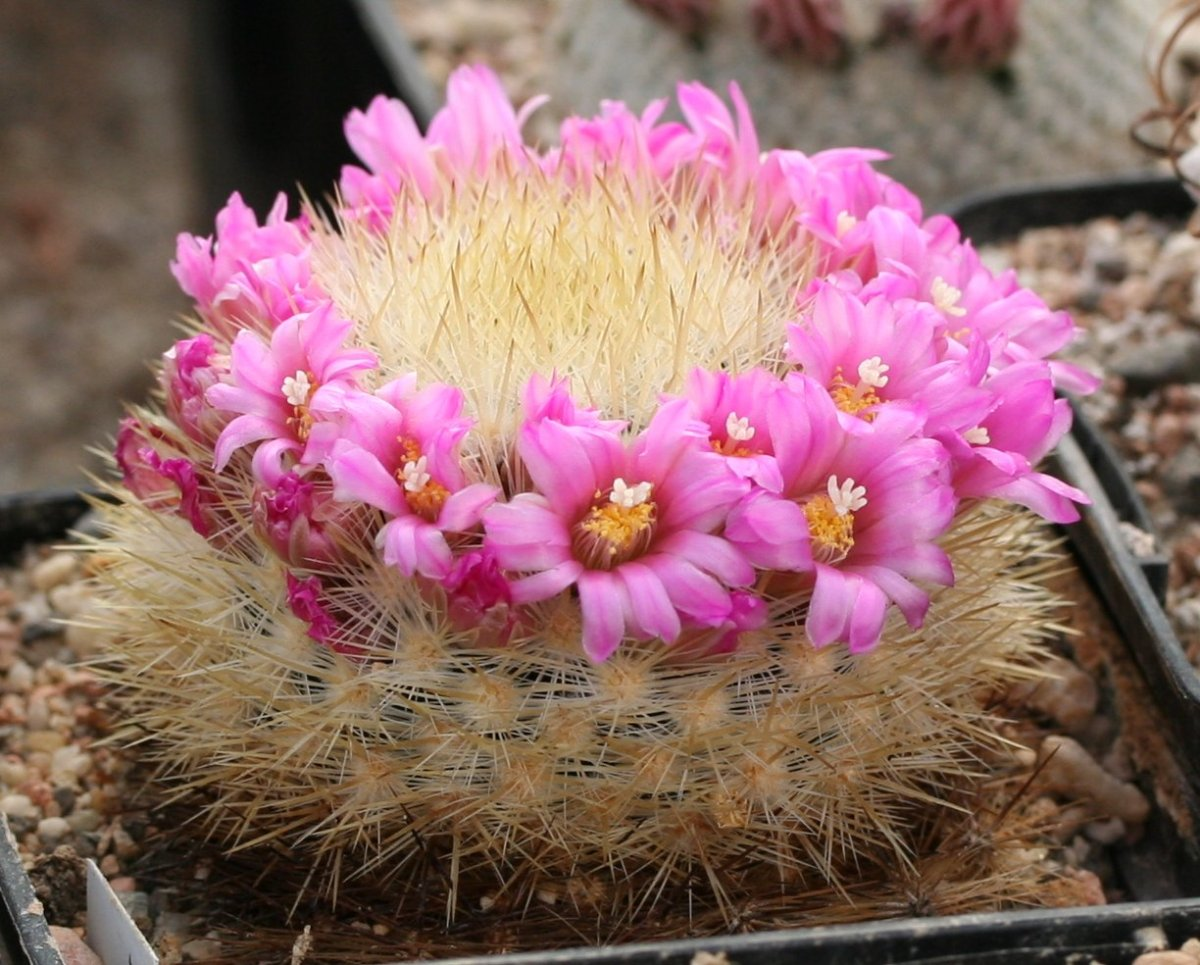
- In bloom
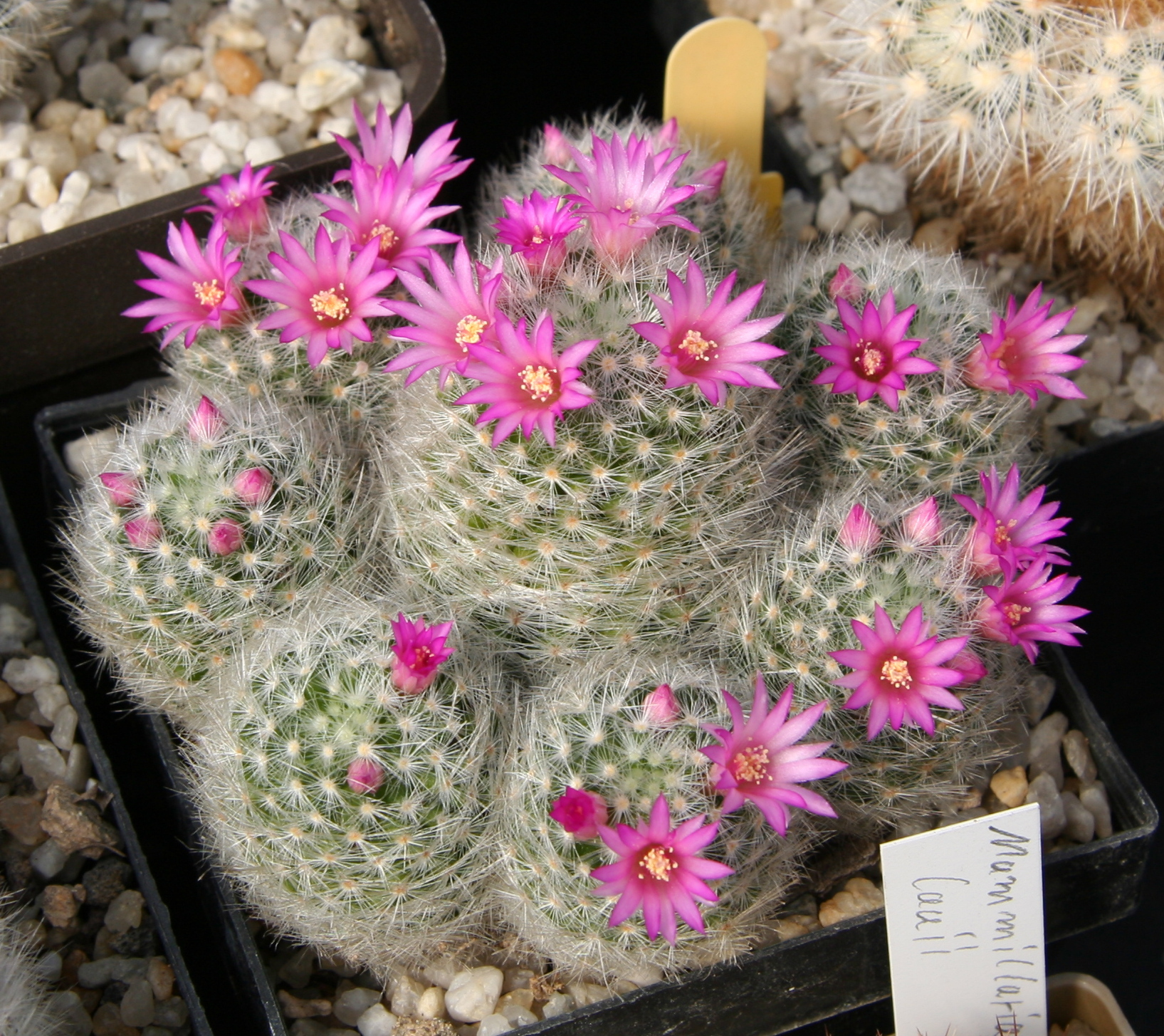
- Individuals tend to form clumps over time

Conservation status
- Critically Endangered (IUCN 3.1)

Scientific classification
- Kingdom: Plantae
- Clade: Embryophytes
- Clade: Tracheophytes
- Clade: Angiosperms
- Clade: Eudicots
- Order: Caryophyllales
- Family: Cactaceae
- Subfamily: Cactoideae
- Genus: Mammillaria
- Species: M. laui

Binomial name
- Mammillaria laui D.R.Hunt

Synonyms
- List: Escobariopsis laui (D.R.Hunt) Doweld 2000; Escobariopsis laui subsp. dasyacantha (D.R.Hunt) Doweld 2000; Escobariopsis laui subsp. subducta (D.R.Hunt) Doweld 2000; Mammillaria laui subsp. dasyacantha (D.R.Hunt) D.R.Hunt 1997; Mammillaria laui f. dasyacantha D.R.Hunt 1979; Mammillaria laui f. subducta D.R.Hunt 1979; Mammillaria laui subsp. subducta (D.R.Hunt) D.R.Hunt 1997; Mammillaria subducta (D.R.Hunt) Repp. 1989; Mammillaria subducta var. dasyacantha (D.R.Hunt) Repp. 1989

= Mammillaria laui =

Species of cactus

Mammillaria laui is a species of cactus in the genus Mammillaria, native to Tamaulipas state in Mexico. A number of subspecies were described, occurring along an elevation gradient; these are no longer accepted. It is listed as Critically Endangered (CR) in the wild.

== Description ==
Mammillaria laui grows solitary in depressed, spherical or spurring shapes, reaching up to 6 centimeters (2.4 in) in height and 4.5 centimeters (1.8 in) in diameter. Its densely packed, bulbous-conical warts are dark green, non-lacerating, and may have sparse wool in the axils or be bare. The plant features 30 to 40 fine, bristle-like radial spines that are 4 to 8 millimeters long, glassy white, irregularly radiating, and protrude outward, covering the body. It also has 5 to 8 central spines, slightly thicker than the radial spines, measuring 6 to 7 millimeters long, protruding, and yellow with a bulbous, thickened base.

The flowers are broadly funnel-shaped, about the same diameter as the plant, and measure 1.6 to 2 centimeters in length. They are bright carmine pink. The whitish fruits are spherical to oblong, small (2 to 6 millimeters long), and contain black seeds.

== Distribution ==
This species is found between Ciudad Victoria and Jaumave in the Mexican state of Tamaulipas, where it inhabits mountainous regions between 800 and 1,700 meters (2,600 and 5,600 ft) elevation.

== Taxonomy ==
Mammillaria laui was first described in 1979 by David Richard Hunt. The name honors the German cactus researcher Alfred Bernhard Lau.

As Mammillaria lauii it has gained the Royal Horticultural Society's Award of Garden Merit.
