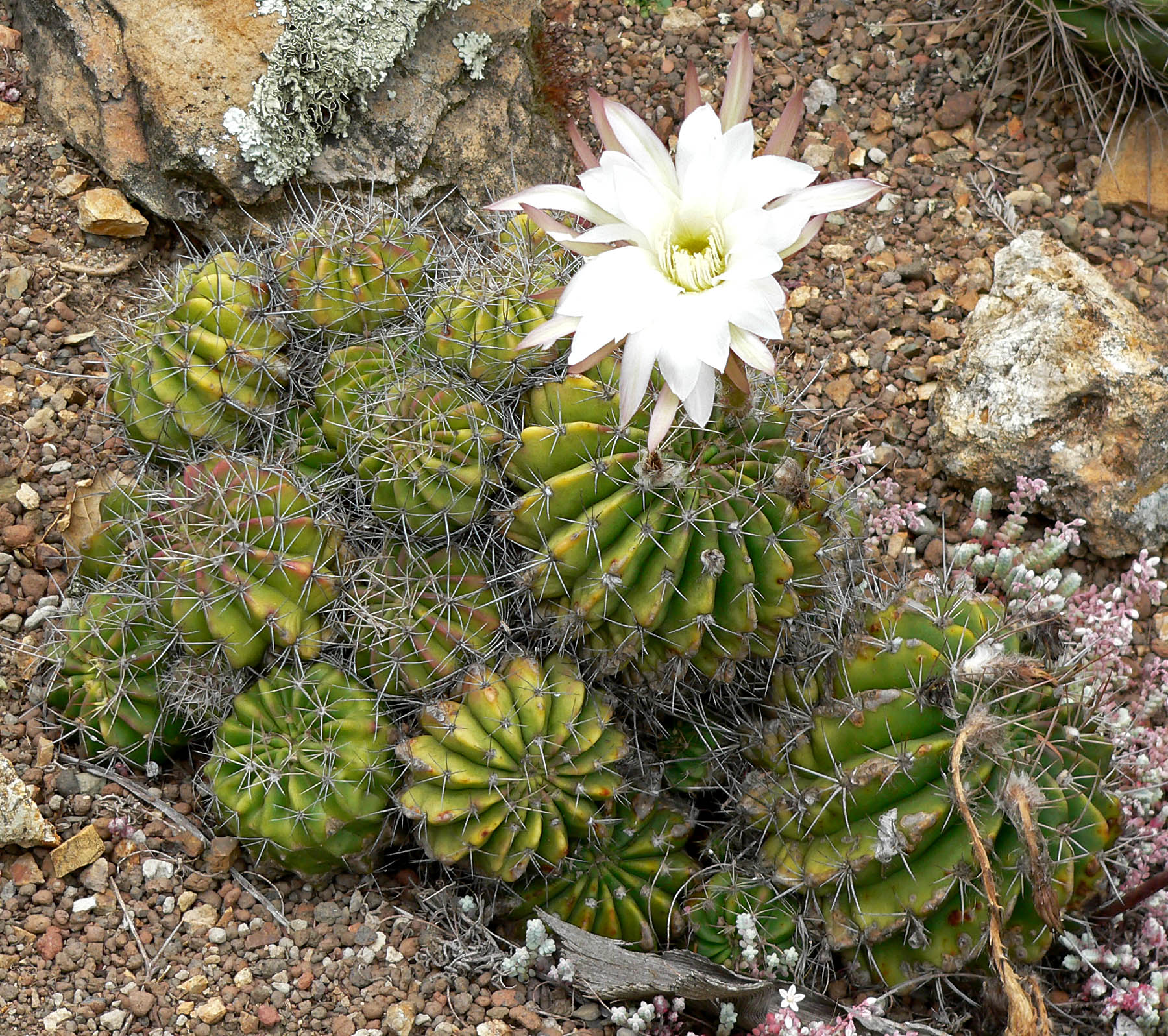

Conservation status
- Least Concern (IUCN 3.1)

Scientific classification
- Kingdom: Plantae
- Clade: Tracheophytes
- Clade: Angiosperms
- Clade: Eudicots
- Order: Caryophyllales
- Family: Cactaceae
- Subfamily: Cactoideae
- Genus: Echinopsis
- Species: E. rojasii

Binomial name
- Echinopsis rojasii Cárdenas, 1951

Synonyms
- Echinopsis rojasii var. albiflora Cárdenas, 1951; Lobivia rojasii (Cárdenas) Schlumpb., 2012; Pseudolobivia rojasii (Cárdenas) Backeb., 1959; Pseudolobivia rojasii var. albiflora (Cárdenas) Backeb., 1959

= Echinopsis rojasii =

Species of cactus

Echinopsis rojasii is a species of succulent plant in the genus Echinopsis, within the family Cactaceae. It is endemic to the departments of Santa Cruz and Cochabamba in Bolivia.

== Description ==
Echinopsis rojasii is a species of cactus with a solitary habit. Its stem has a globose growth form, and it grows to approximately 11 cm in diameter and 6 cm in height, with a narrowly umbilicate apex. The epidermis is ashy green in color, and on some specimens, the margins of the ribs exhibit reddish tones.

Plant with flower buds

This species has approximately 16 straight, acute ribs, which measure up to 1.5 cm in height and 1.7 cm in width, with dentate outlines. They are divided into hatchet-shaped, obtuse tubercles. The ribs nearest to the apical meristem are spineless. The areoles are situated approximately 2 cm apart; they are irregularly circular in shape, measuring approximately 6 mm in diameter, and have an ashy gray felt-like covering. This species has 8-10 radial spines measuring 5-14 mm in length per areole; these measure 5-14 mm in length, are curved towards the stem, and are somewhat pectinate. There is 1 central spine, which is pointed upwards, exhibits a slight curvature, and measures 15-17 mm in length. All spines are subulate, and are white in color with brown tips. The flower buds appear laterally in the upper third of the stem, and they are densely covered in white wool. The flowers, which are generally approximately 6 in number, are funnel shaped, and measure 11-12 cm in length and 6-8 cm in diameter.

The ovary is globose to elliptical in shape, measuring approximately 1.5 cm in length. It is green in color, and has acute, reddish bracts measuring 1.5 mm in length, which are covered in long brown and white trichomes. The floral tube is straight, measures 6-7 cm in length, is slightly widened towards the top, and is green in color; the bracts are approximately 3 mm in length, are reddish in color, and have long white and blackish trichomes. The internal surface of the tube is green in color. The external parts of the perianth are lanceolate-linear in shape and measure 3-4 cm in length. They are green-brown in color. The intermediate parts are lanceolate in shape, measure 4-5 cm in length, and are pink with a central brown area on the outer surface and brown with a central red-magenta stripe on the inner surface. The internal parts are spatulate in shape, measure approximately 5 cm in length, and are rounded at the ends. They have light pink margins and are an intense purple-magenta color on the midline and at the base. However, they may also be white in color.

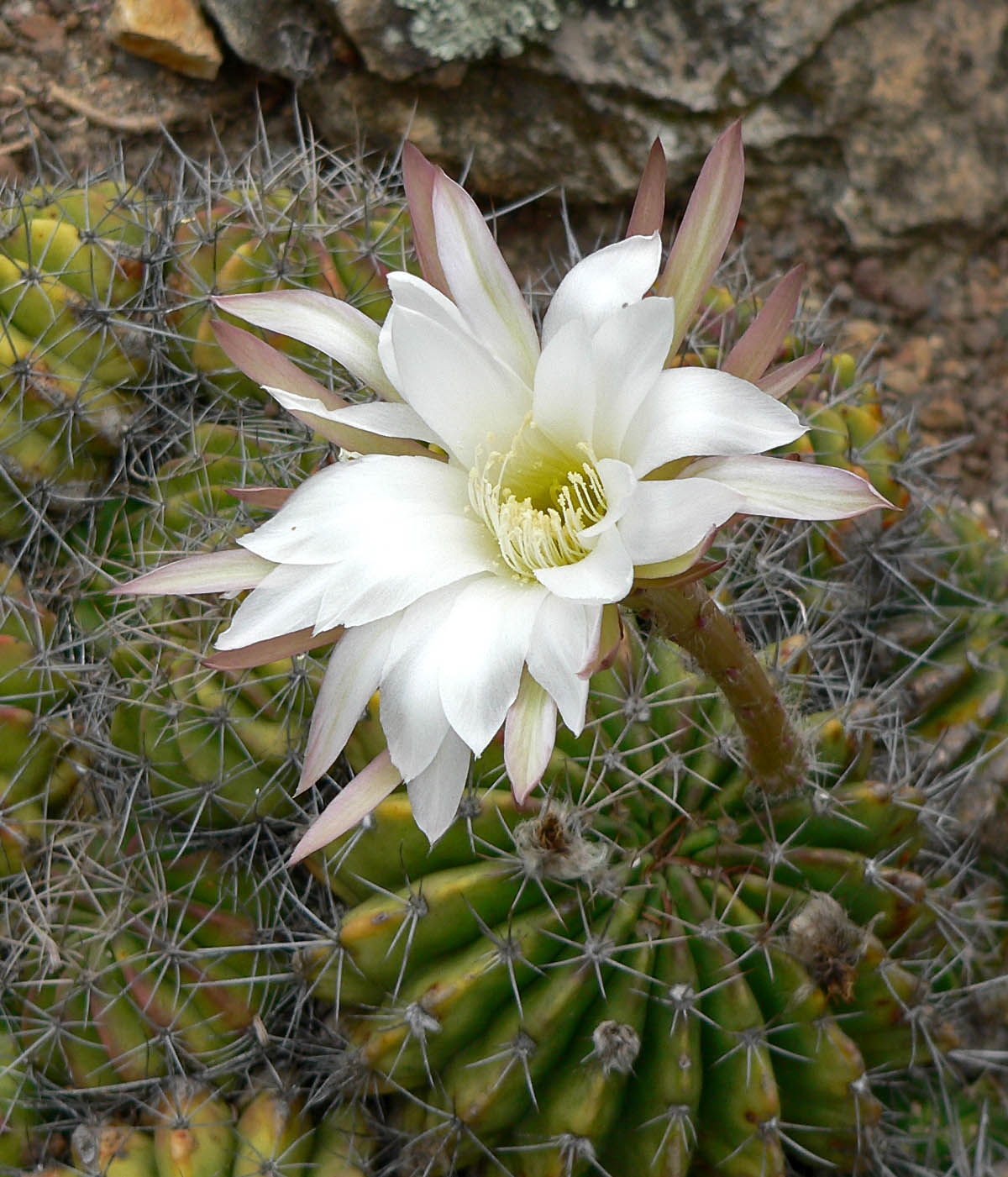
Flower

In habitat in Florida, Santa Cruz Department, Bolivia

The stamens are situated in two series. The lower stamens are inserted from the middle of the floral tube upwards; they measure 4-5 cm in length and have green filaments. The upper stamens are situated on the bases of the inner tepals; these measure approximately 2 cm in length, and their filaments are white at the base and pink towards the apex. All of the anthers are yellow. The style measures approximately 9 cm in length. It is thin, green, and does not extend past the upper stamens. The stigma has 8-9 lobes, to approximately 12 mm in length. These are yellow-green in color. The fruit is ovoid in shape. It measures 2-3 cm in length, has a slightly tuberculate surface, is greenish-purple in color, and is covered in silky white trichomes. The seeds are black in color, slightly shiny, mitre-shaped, and approximately 1 mm in diameter.

=== Similar species ===
Echinopsis rojasii is often confused with Echinopsis obrepanda, which is also present in central Cochabamba. It may be distinguished by its smaller size, less-acute ribs, lower number of spines (which are smaller in size), and smaller flower with an almost-straight tube and narrower and thinner bracts. Furthermore, the fruits of E. rojasii are distinctive due to their ovoid shape, greenish-purple color, and how they narrow towards their apices.

== Distribution and habitat ==
This species is native to the departments of Santa Cruz and Cochabamba in Bolivia.

It mainly inhabits the seasonally-dry tropical biome at altitudes between 1300 and 2800 meters above sea level. It grows in seasonally-dry intermontane valleys which are characterized by open or sparse forests, being adapted to high levels of climactic variation as well as limited water availability during part of the year.

== Taxonomy ==
Echinopsis rojasii was described by the Bolivian botanist Martín Cárdenas Hermosa, who published this name in the Revista de Agricultura (Cochabamba) 6: 31 in 1951.

Etymology

- Echinopsis: the genus name is derived from the Latin term ĕchīnus (meaning "hedgehog") and the Greek term opsis (meaning "appearing similar to"); this refers to the globose, spiny stems present in many species of this genus.
- rojasii: the specific epithet refers to the locality of Puerto Rojas in the department of Santa Cruz, where this species is found.

== Conservation status ==
On the IUCN Red List, Echinopsis rojasii is classified as being "Least Concern" (LC), meaning that it currently does not face a high risk of extinction, and that its populations are considered to be relatively stable on a global scale.

However, it may be affected by local threats, such as those associated with the expansion of subsistence agriculture. These pressures, though, do not appear to currently have a significant impact on the general trajectory of this species.

== Cultivation ==
Echinopsis rojasii is cultivated mainly as an ornamental. It may be propagated vegetatively by cuttings, or by seed. It may be considered rare in collections.
