= E. cinnabarina =

E. cinnabarina may refer to:

- Echinopsis cinnabarina, a hedgehog cactus
- Euxoa cinnabarina, an owlet moth
