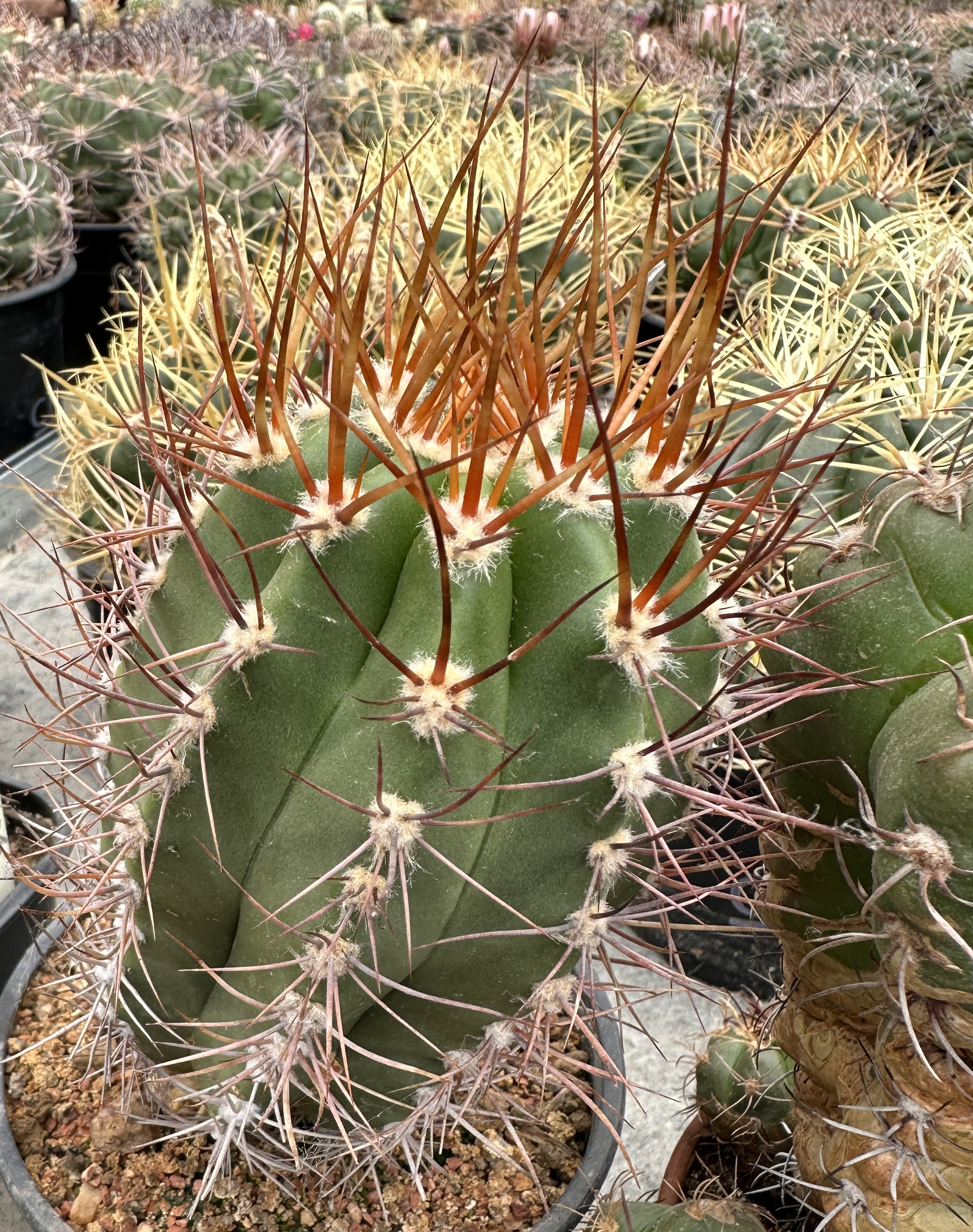

Conservation status
- Near Threatened (IUCN 3.1)

Scientific classification
- Kingdom: Plantae
- Clade: Tracheophytes
- Clade: Angiosperms
- Clade: Eudicots
- Order: Caryophyllales
- Family: Cactaceae
- Subfamily: Cactoideae
- Genus: Echinopsis
- Species: E. caineana

Binomial name
- Echinopsis caineana (Cárdenas) D.R.Hunt

Synonyms
- Echinopsis krahn-juckeri (Diers) M.Lowry; Lobivia abrantha Y.Itô; Lobivia caineana Cárdenas; Lobivia krahn-juckeri Diers

= Echinopsis caineana =

Species of cactus

Echinopsis caineana, synonym Lobivia caineana, is a species of Echinopsis found in Bolivia.

== Description ==
Echinopsis caineana grows singly. The ellipsoidal, fresh green shoots reach heights of 10 to 29 centimeters with diameters of 7 to 9 centimeters. The shoot apex is sunk. There are nine ribs, which are clear on the upper parts of the shoots, but flat and blunt further down. The elliptical areoles on it are cream-colored to gray and are up to 2.5 centimeters apart. From them arise 14 to 18 gray to whitish, aquiline thorns that are darkly tipped. Some of the unequal thorns are spreading and others are protruding. The thorns are 1.5 to 7 centimeters long.

The funnel-shaped, deep purple-pink to pink or magenta, occasionally white flowers appear on the tips of the shoots and open during the day. They are 5 to 7 centimeters long and have a diameter of 4 to 6 centimeters. The egg-shaped fruits are almost dry and up to 2 centimeters long.

== Taxonomy ==
The species was first described by Martín Cárdenas in 1952 as Lobivia caineana. The specific epithet caineana refers to the occurrence of the species in the valley of the Río Caine. It was transferred to the genus Echinopsis by David R. Hunt in 1991.

== Distribution ==
Echinopsis caineana is widespread in the Bolivian department of Potosí in the province of Charcas at medium altitudes of around 2000 meters.
