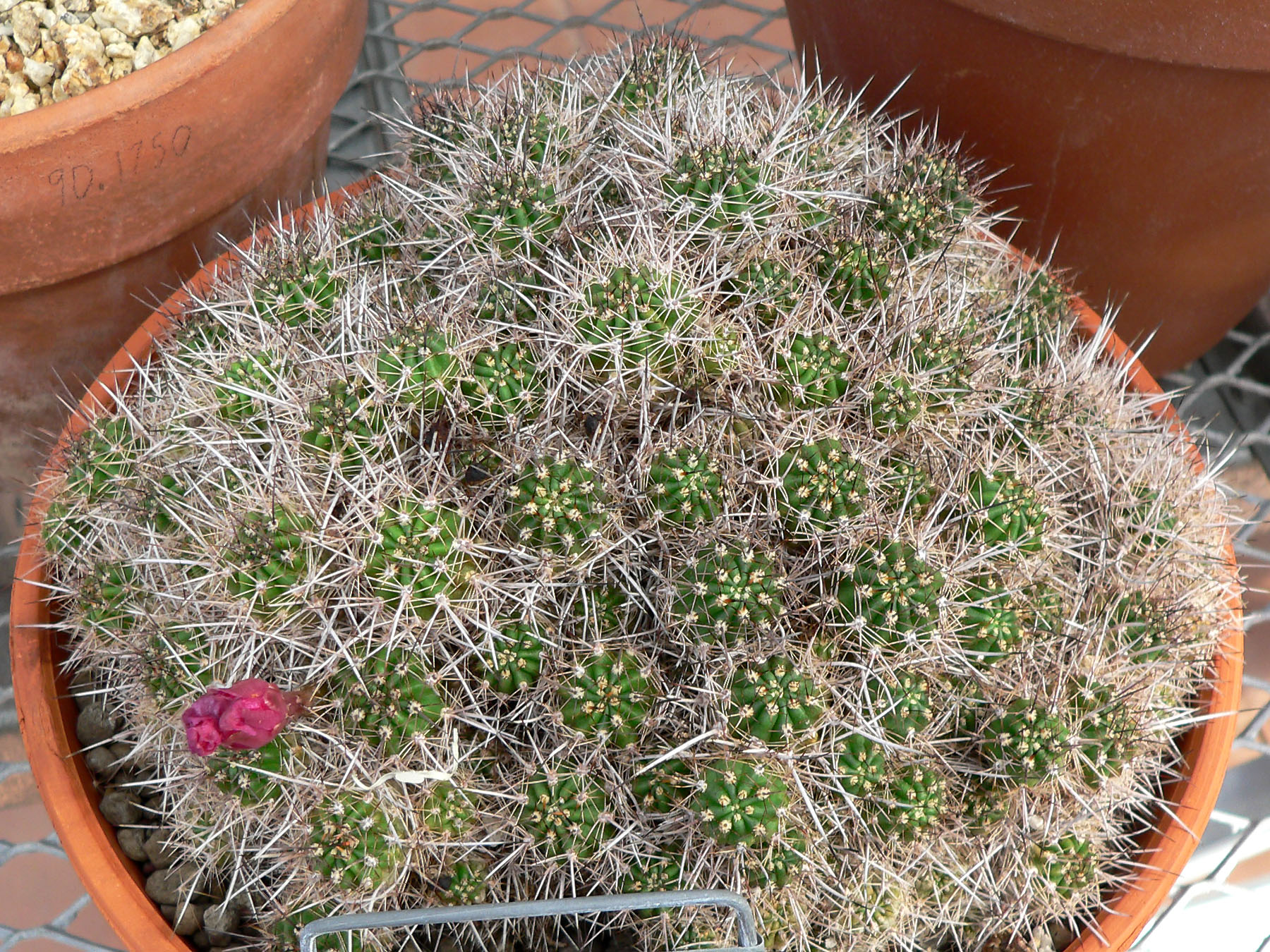

Scientific classification
- Kingdom: Plantae
- Clade: Tracheophytes
- Clade: Angiosperms
- Clade: Eudicots
- Order: Caryophyllales
- Family: Cactaceae
- Subfamily: Cactoideae
- Genus: Echinopsis
- Species: E. yuquina

Binomial name
- Echinopsis yuquina D.R.Hunt

Synonyms
- Lobivia rauschii Zecher

= Echinopsis yuquina =

Species of cactus

Echinopsis yuquina, synonym Lobivia rauschii, is a species of Echinopsis found in Bolivia.

== Taxonomy ==
The species was first described in 1974 as Lobivia rauschii. When David R. Hunt moved it to the genus Echinopsis in 1991, the name Echinopsis rauschii was already in use for a different species described in 1974, so the replacement name Echinopsis yuquina was needed.
