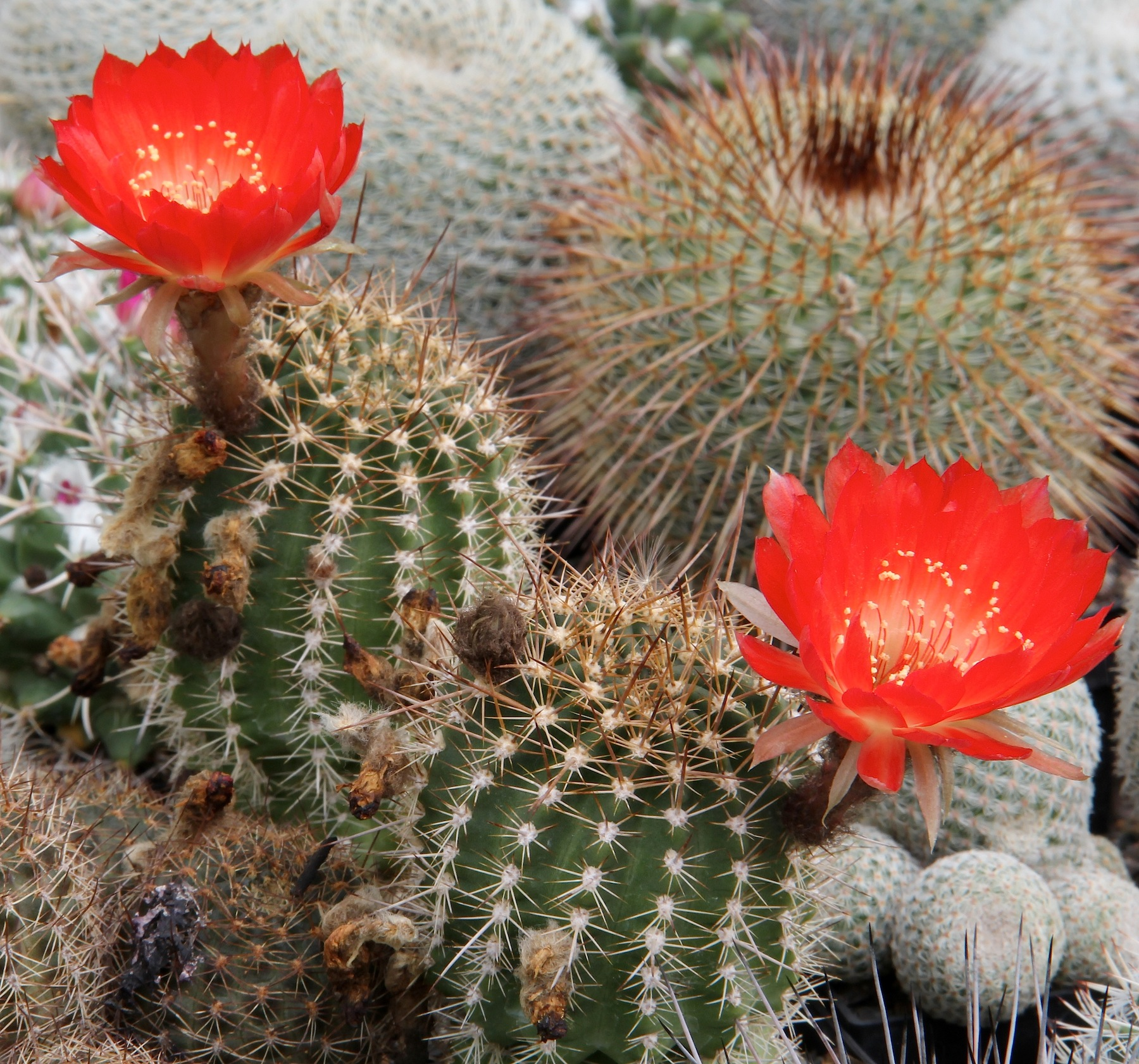

Conservation status
- Endangered (IUCN 3.1)

Scientific classification
- Kingdom: Plantae
- Clade: Tracheophytes
- Clade: Angiosperms
- Clade: Eudicots
- Order: Caryophyllales
- Family: Cactaceae
- Subfamily: Cactoideae
- Genus: Echinopsis
- Species: E. hertrichiana

Binomial name
- Echinopsis hertrichiana (Backeb.) D.R.Hunt

Synonyms
- List: Lobivia allegraiana Backeb.; Lobivia backebergii subsp. hertrichiana (Backeb.) Rausch ex G.D.Rowley; Lobivia backebergii var. hertrichiana (Backeb.) Rausch; Lobivia backebergii var. laui (Donald) Rausch; Lobivia backebergii var. simplex (Rausch) Rausch; Lobivia binghamiana Backeb.; Lobivia echinata Rausch; Lobivia hertrichiana Backeb.; Lobivia hertrichiana f. .minuta (F.Ritter) J.Ullmann; Lobivia hertrichiana f. allegraiana (Backeb.) J.Ullmann; Lobivia hertrichiana f. binghamiana (Backeb.) J.Ullmann; Lobivia hertrichiana f. echinata (Rausch) J.Ullmann; Lobivia hertrichiana f. huilcanota (Rauh & Backeb.) J.Ullmann; Lobivia hertrichiana f. incaica (Backeb.) J.Ullmann; Lobivia hertrichiana var. laui (Donald) Rausch; Lobivia hertrichiana f. planiceps (Backeb.) J.Ullmann; Lobivia hertrichiana f. prolifera (F.Ritter) J.Ullmann; Lobivia hertrichiana var. simplex (Rausch) Rausch; Lobivia hertrichiana f. wegneriana (Grunert & Kluegel.) J.Ullmann; Lobivia huilcanota Rauh & Backeb.; Lobivia incaica Backeb.; Lobivia laui Donald; Lobivia minuta F.Ritter; Lobivia planiceps Backeb.; Lobivia simplex Rausch; Lobivia vilcabambae F.Ritter; Lobivia wegneriana Grunert & Kluegel.; Neolobivia echinata (Rausch) F.Ritter; Neolobivia hertrichiana (Backeb.) F.Ritter; Neolobivia incaica (Backeb.) F.Ritter; Neolobivia minuta (F.Ritter) F.Ritter; Neolobivia prolifera F.Ritter; Neolobivia vilcabambae (F.Ritter) F.Ritter

= Echinopsis hertrichiana =

Species of cactus

Echinopsis hertrichiana is a species of Echinopsis found in Peru.

== Description ==
Echinopsis hertrichiana grows singly or forms groups. The spherical, shiny medium to light green shoots reach a diameter of up to 10 centimetres (3.9 in). There are about eleven sharp ribs that are grooved transversely, with circular, white areoles. The single, upwardly curved central spine is straw-colored and up to 2.5 centimetres (0.98 in) long. The six to eight spreading, yellowish-brown marginal spines are up to 1.5 centimetres (0.59 in) long.

The short, funnel-shaped, flowers open widely during the day, are up to 6 centimetres (2.4 in) long and 7 centimetres (2.8 in) in diameter. They are colored in various shades of bright red and often have a whitish throat. They produce small, spherical fruits.

== Taxonomy ==
The species was first described by Curt Backeberg in 1933 as Lobivia hertrichiana. The specific epithet hertrichiana honors the American William Hertrich (1878–1966), curator of the Huntington Botanical Gardens in California. In 1991, David R. Hunt transferred the species to the genus Echinopsis, the placement accepted by Plants of the World Online as of November 2025. The species has numerous other synonyms.

== Distribution ==
Echinopsis hertrichiana is widespread in the Cusco region of Peru, western Bolivia, and the Chilean province of Iquique at altitudes of 3000 to 3500 meters.
