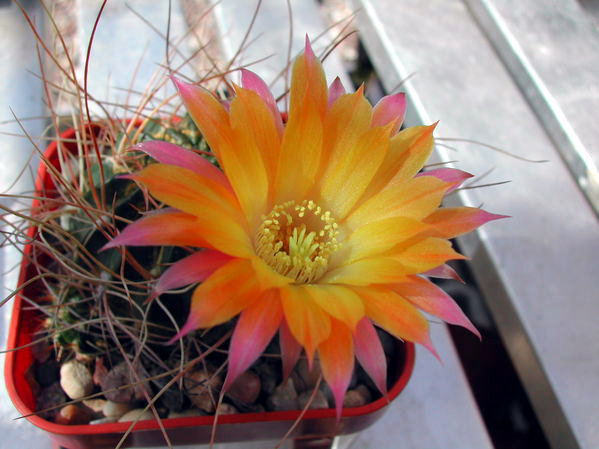

Conservation status
- Endangered (IUCN 3.1)

Scientific classification
- Kingdom: Plantae
- Clade: Tracheophytes
- Clade: Angiosperms
- Clade: Eudicots
- Order: Caryophyllales
- Family: Cactaceae
- Subfamily: Cactoideae
- Genus: Echinopsis
- Species: E. pampana

Binomial name
- Echinopsis pampana (Britton & Rose) D.R.Hunt

Synonyms
- Echinopsis mistiensis Werderm. & Backeb.; Lobivia aureosenilis Kníže; Lobivia glaucescens F.Ritter; Lobivia mistiensis (Werderm. & Backeb.) Backeb.; Lobivia pampana Britton & Rose

= Echinopsis pampana =

Species of plant

Echinopsis pampana, synonyms including Lobivia pampana, is a species of Echinopsis found in Peru.

== Description ==
Echinopsis pampana usually grows singly and rarely sprouts. The spherical, blue-green to gray-green shoots reach a diameter of 10 centimeters and a height of up to 7.5 centimeters. They have a large taproot. There are 18 to 30 wide, sharp-edged, wavy ribs at its base, which are arranged in a spiral and have humps with obliquely offset cusps. The areoles on them are 1 to 2 centimeters apart. The needle-like to elastic thorns arising from them are yellowish pink to brown to blackish. The one or two upwardly curved central spines are up to 7 centimeters long. The nine to ten slightly curved marginal spines are 1 centimeter long.

The short, funnel-shaped flowers are open during the day. They are pink-beige to orange-red to yellow in color. The flowers are 3 to 5 centimeters (rarely up to 7 centimeters) long and have the same diameter. The egg-shaped to spherical fruits are juicy and reach a diameter of 2 centimeters.

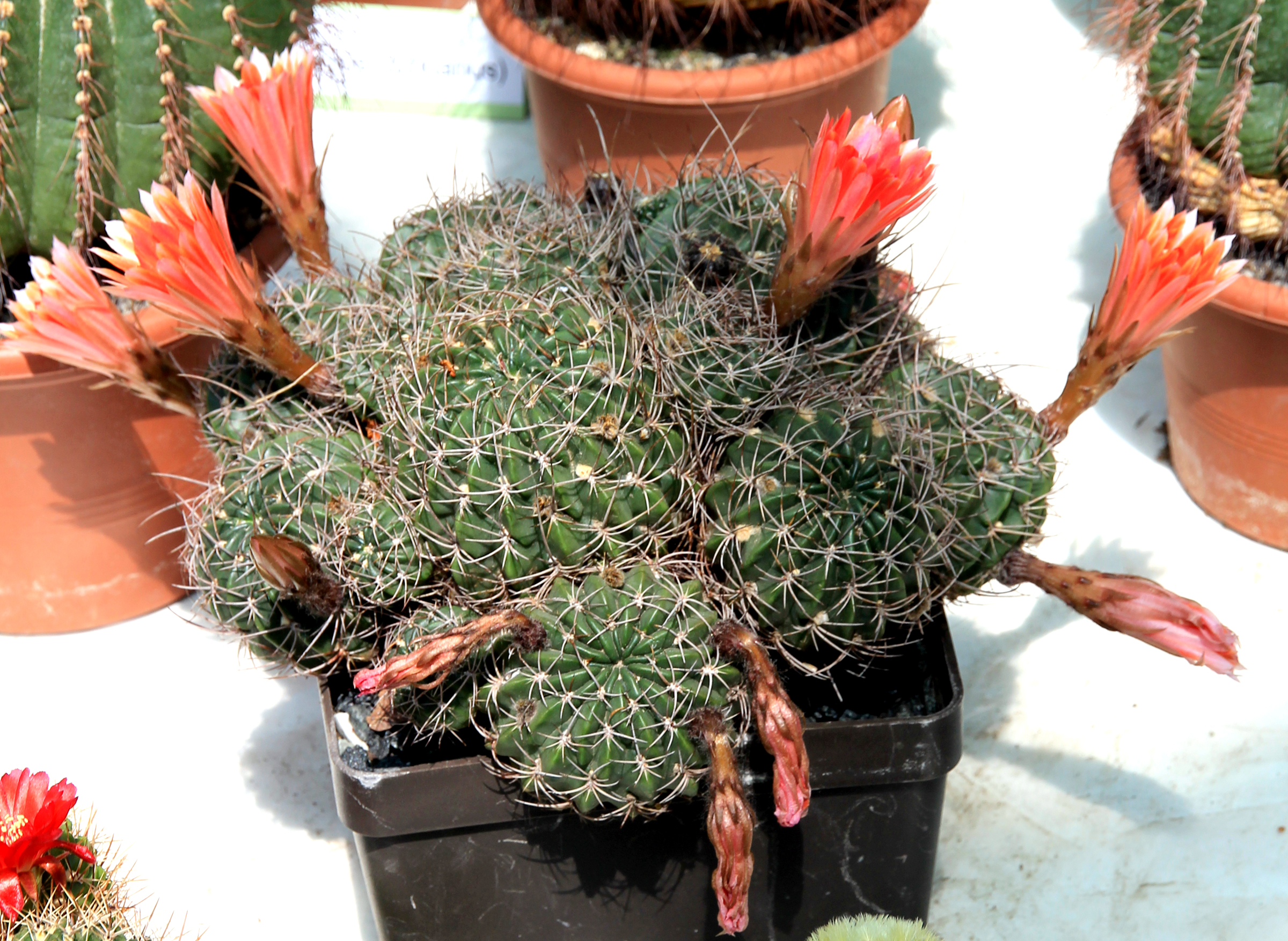
Plant

== Taxonomy ==
The species was first described by Nathaniel Lord Britton and Joseph Nelson Rose in 1922 as Lobivia pampana. The specific epithet pampana refers to the occurrence of the species in the Peruvian Pampa de Arrieros. In 1991, David R. Hunt transferred the species to Echinopsis, the placement accepted by Plants of the World Online as of November 2025.

== Distribution ==
Echinopsis pampana is widespread in the Peruvian regions of Arequipa and Moquegua at altitudes of 3500 to 4100 meters.
