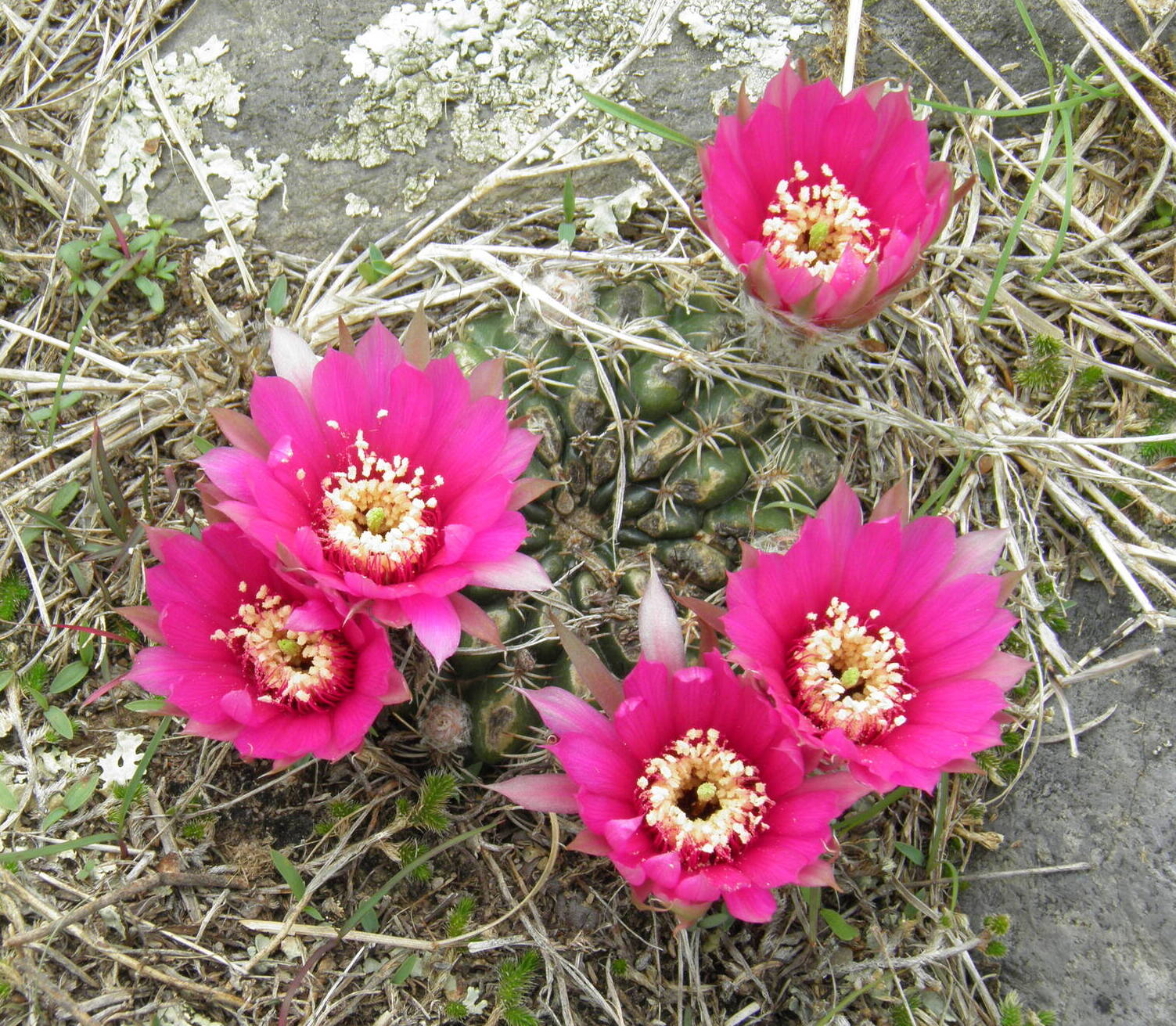

Conservation status
- Least Concern (IUCN 3.1)

Scientific classification
- Kingdom: Plantae
- Clade: Tracheophytes
- Clade: Angiosperms
- Clade: Eudicots
- Order: Caryophyllales
- Family: Cactaceae
- Subfamily: Cactoideae
- Genus: Echinopsis
- Species: E. tiegeliana

Binomial name
- Echinopsis tiegeliana (Wessner) D.R.Hunt

Synonyms
- List: Echinopsis fricii (Rausch) Friedrich; Hymenorebutia pusilla (F.Ritter) F.Ritter; Hymenorebutia pusilla f. flaviflora (F.Ritter) F.Ritter; Hymenorebutia tiegeliana (Wessner) F.Ritter; Hymenorebutia tiegeliana var. dimorphipetala F.Ritter; Hymenorebutia tiegeliana var. distefanoiana (Cullmann & F.Ritter) F.Ritter; Hymenorebutia tiegeliana var. ruberrima (Rausch) F.Ritter; Lobivia fricii Rausch; Lobivia graulichii var. cinnabarina Frič; Lobivia peclardiana Krainz; Lobivia peclardiana var. albiflora Krainz; Lobivia peclardiana var. winterae Krainz; Lobivia pusilla F.Ritter; Lobivia tiegeliana Wessner; Lobivia tiegeliana var. borealis Diers & Jucker; Lobivia tiegeliana var. cinnabarina (Frič) G.D.Rowley; Lobivia tiegeliana var. distefanoiana Cullmann & F.Ritter; Lobivia tiegeliana var. flaviflora (F.Ritter) Rausch; Lobivia tiegeliana var. fricii (Rausch) Rausch; Lobivia tiegeliana var. peclardiana (Krainz) Krainz; Lobivia tiegeliana var. pusilla (F.Ritter) Rausch; Lobivia tiegeliana var. ruberrima Rausch; Lobivia tiegeliana var. uriondoensis Rausch; Mediolobivia hirsutissima Cárdenas

= Echinopsis tiegeliana =

Species of cactus

Echinopsis tiegeliana, synonyms including Lobivia tiegeliana, is a species of Lobivia found in northwest Argentina and Bolivia.

== Description ==
Echinopsis tiegeliana usually grows individually. The dwarf, depressed spherical to spherical, shiny green shoots reach a diameter of up to 6 centimeters. There are 17 to 20 sharp-edged and spirally arranged ribs, which are divided into cusps. The areoles on them are white and are up to 1.5 centimeters apart. Reddish to horn-colored, prickly thorns emerge from them and turn gray with age. The up to three central spines are directed downwards and up to 5 centimeters long. The eight to ten marginal spines are 4 by 6 centimeters long.

The shiny violet-pink flowers, yellow in the flaviflora variety, appear near the top of the shoot and open during the day. They are up to 2.5 centimeters long and have a diameter of 4.3 centimeters. The spherical to egg-shaped, semi-dry fruits tear open.

== Taxonomy ==
The first description by Wilhelm Wessner as Lobivia tiegeliana was published in 1939. It was transferred to the genus Echinopsis in 1991. The specific epithet tiegeliana honors the German cactus lover and mammalian specialist Ernst Tiegel (1879–1936).

== Distribution ==
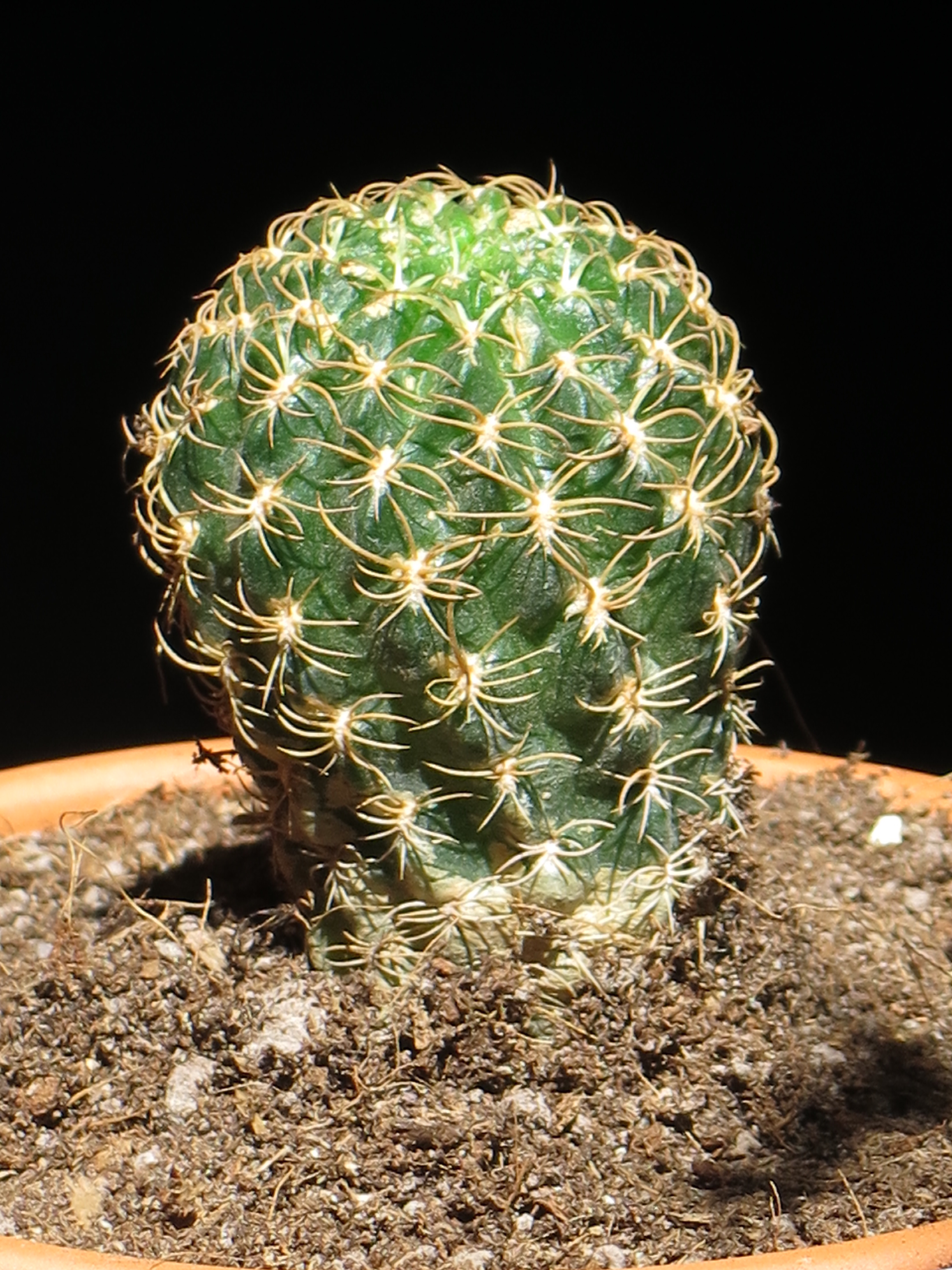

Echinopsis tiegeliana is widespread in the Bolivian department of Tarija and the Argentine province of Salta at altitudes of 1900 to 3300 meters.
