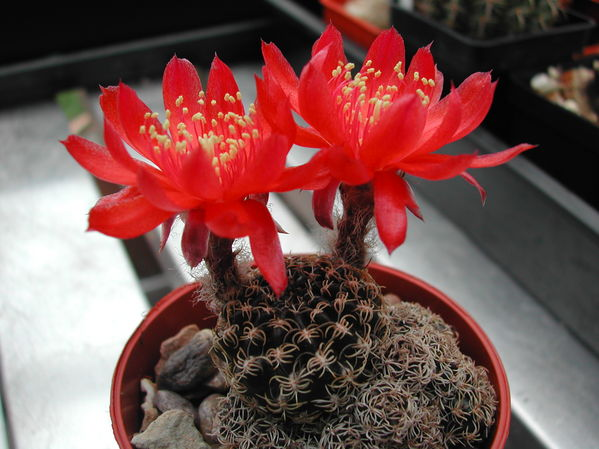

Conservation status
- Least Concern (IUCN 3.1)

Scientific classification
- Kingdom: Plantae
- Clade: Tracheophytes
- Clade: Angiosperms
- Clade: Eudicots
- Order: Caryophyllales
- Family: Cactaceae
- Subfamily: Cactoideae
- Genus: Echinopsis
- Species: E. schieliana

Binomial name
- Echinopsis schieliana (Backeb.) D.R.Hunt

Synonyms
- List: Lobivia backebergii subsp. schieliana (Backeb.) Rausch; Lobivia backebergii var. schieliana (Backeb.) Rausch; Lobivia leptacantha Rausch; Lobivia maximiliana subsp. quiabayensis (Rausch) Rausch; Lobivia maximiliana var. leptacantha (Rausch) Rausch; Lobivia maximiliana var. quiabayensis (Rausch) Rausch; Lobivia quiabayensis Rausch; Lobivia schieliana Backeb.; Lobivia schieliana var. albescens Backeb.; Lobivia schieliana var. leptacantha (Rausch) Rausch; Lobivia schieliana var. quiabayensis (Rausch) Rausch

= Echinopsis schieliana =

Species of cactus

Echinopsis schieliana, synonyms including Lobivia schieliana, is a species of Echinopsis found in Bolivia and Peru.

== Description ==
Echinopsis schieliana often sprouts from the base and forms cushions. The spherical to cylindrical, dark green shoots reach heights of up to 4.5 centimeters with diameters of 3.5 centimeters. There are 13 to 21 ribs. The single light brown central spine, which is often missing initially, is curved downwards and 0.5 to 0.6 centimeters long. The approximately 14 comb-shaped to radiating marginal spines are interwoven. They are flexible, white, yellowish or brown and are 1 to 2 centimeters long.

The short funnel-shaped flowers are bright red, red or sometimes yellow. They are 4 to 5 centimeters long and have the same diameter. The spherical, juicy fruits reach a diameter of up to 1 centimeter.

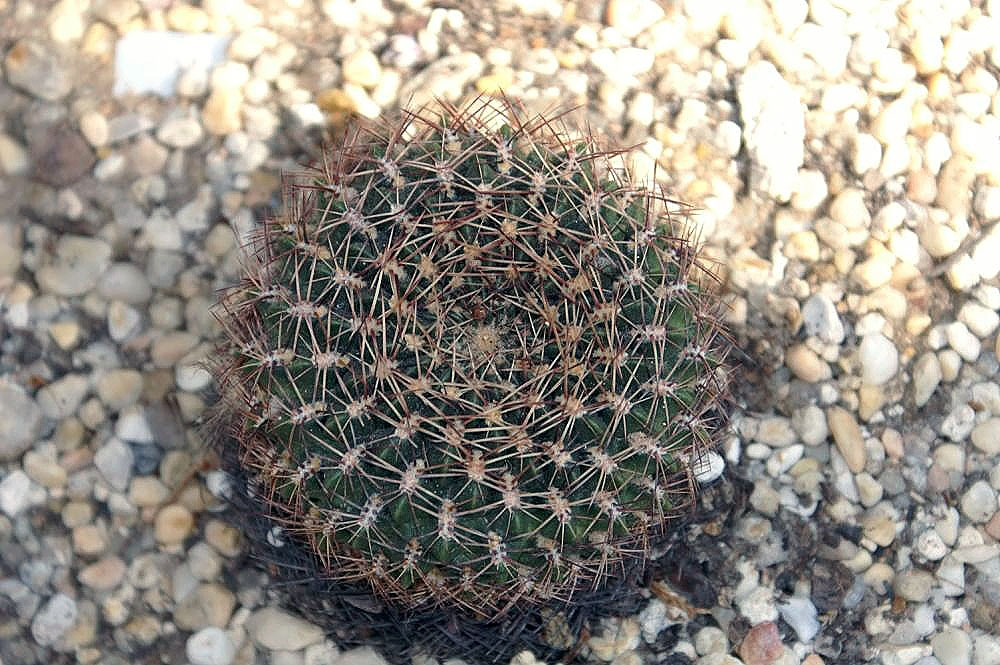
plant

== Taxonomy ==
The first description by Curt Backeberg as Lobivia schieliana was published in 1957. The specific epithet schieliana honors the German cactus lover Wolfgang Schiel (1904–1978), who came from Freiburg. The species was transferred to the genus Echinopsis in 1987 by David R. Hunt.

== Distribution ==
Lobivia schieliana is widespread in the Peruvian regions of Cusco and Puno as well as in the Bolivian department of La Paz at altitudes of 3000 to 3200 meters.
