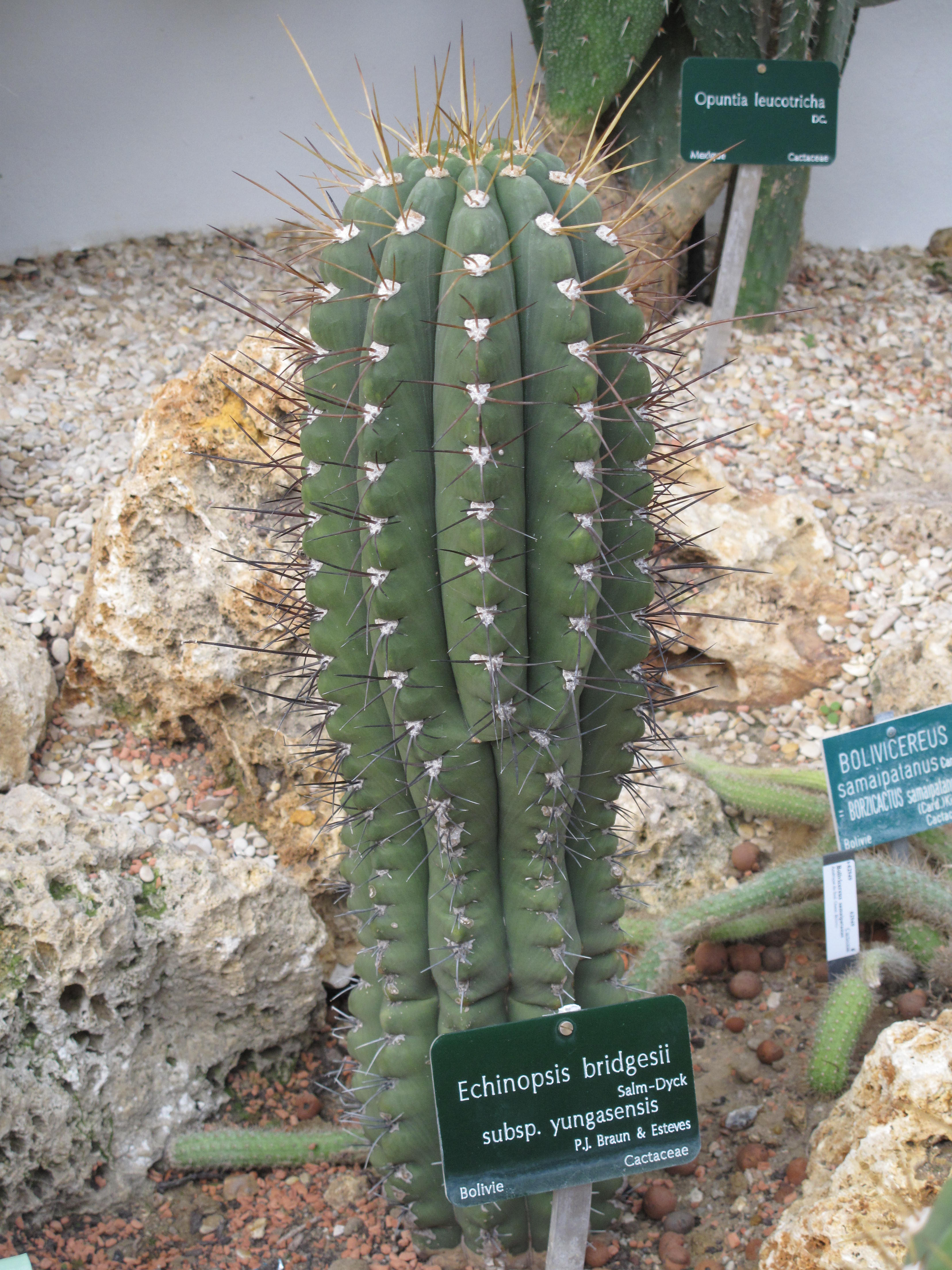

Conservation status
- Least Concern (IUCN 3.1)

Scientific classification
- Kingdom: Plantae
- Clade: Tracheophytes
- Clade: Angiosperms
- Clade: Eudicots
- Order: Caryophyllales
- Family: Cactaceae
- Subfamily: Cactoideae
- Genus: Echinopsis
- Species: E. bridgesii

Binomial name
- Echinopsis bridgesii Salm-Dyck

Synonyms
- Lobivia bridgesii (Salm-Dyck) Schlumpb.; Echinopsis salmiana var. bridgesii (Salm-Dyck) K.Schum.

= Echinopsis bridgesii =

Species of cactus

Echinopsis bridgesii, synonym Lobivia bridgesii, is a species of Echinopsis found in Bolivia.

== Description ==
This species often grows in groups and forms three to six shoots from the base. The spherical to elongated shoots reach heights of up to 40 cm with a diameter of 13 cm. There are nine to twelve distinct ribs that are notched or notched. The large areoles on it are brown. From them spring short and conical or longer and needle-like thorns of up to 2 centimeters in length. The mostly single central spine, sometimes it is missing or several are formed, is tipped gray and darker. The 8-10 very uneven marginal spines are brown.

The white flowers open at night. They are 15 to 20 centimeters long.

== Taxonomy ==
The first description by Joseph zu Salm-Reifferscheidt-Dyck was published in 1850.

=== Subspecies ===
A distinction is made between the following subspecies:

Image	Name	Description	Distribution
	Echinopsis bridgesii subsp. bridgesii	The shoots of this subspecies are up to 40 centimeters long and reach a diameter of 13 centimeters. The up to twelve ribs are not notched. The needle-like, gray to brownish thorns are up to 2 centimeters long. The flowers are up to 18 centimeters long.	Department of La Paz, Bolivia
	Echinopsis bridgesii subsp. vallegrandensis (Cárdenas) Schlumpb.	short, thicker, spines and more numerous ribs.	Santa Cruz, Florida, between Mataral and Vallegrande, Bolivia at 2700 m
	Echinopsis bridgesii subsp. yungasensis (F. Knight) P.J. Braun & Esteves	The shoots are 20 to 40 centimeters high and reach diameters of 7 to 13 centimeters. The nine to eleven ribs are notched somewhat. The brown thorns are tipped darker and turn gray. There are either about nine, thickly conical and only about 0.2 centimeters long or twelve to 14 needles and 0.5 to 2 centimeters long thorns. The flowers are up to 23 centimeters long.	lowlands of the provinces of Nor Yungas and Sud Yungas.

== Distribution ==
Echinopsis bridgesii is commonly found in the department of La Paz, Bolivia growing in dry valleys and the puna grassland at elevations of 2900 to 3200 meters.
