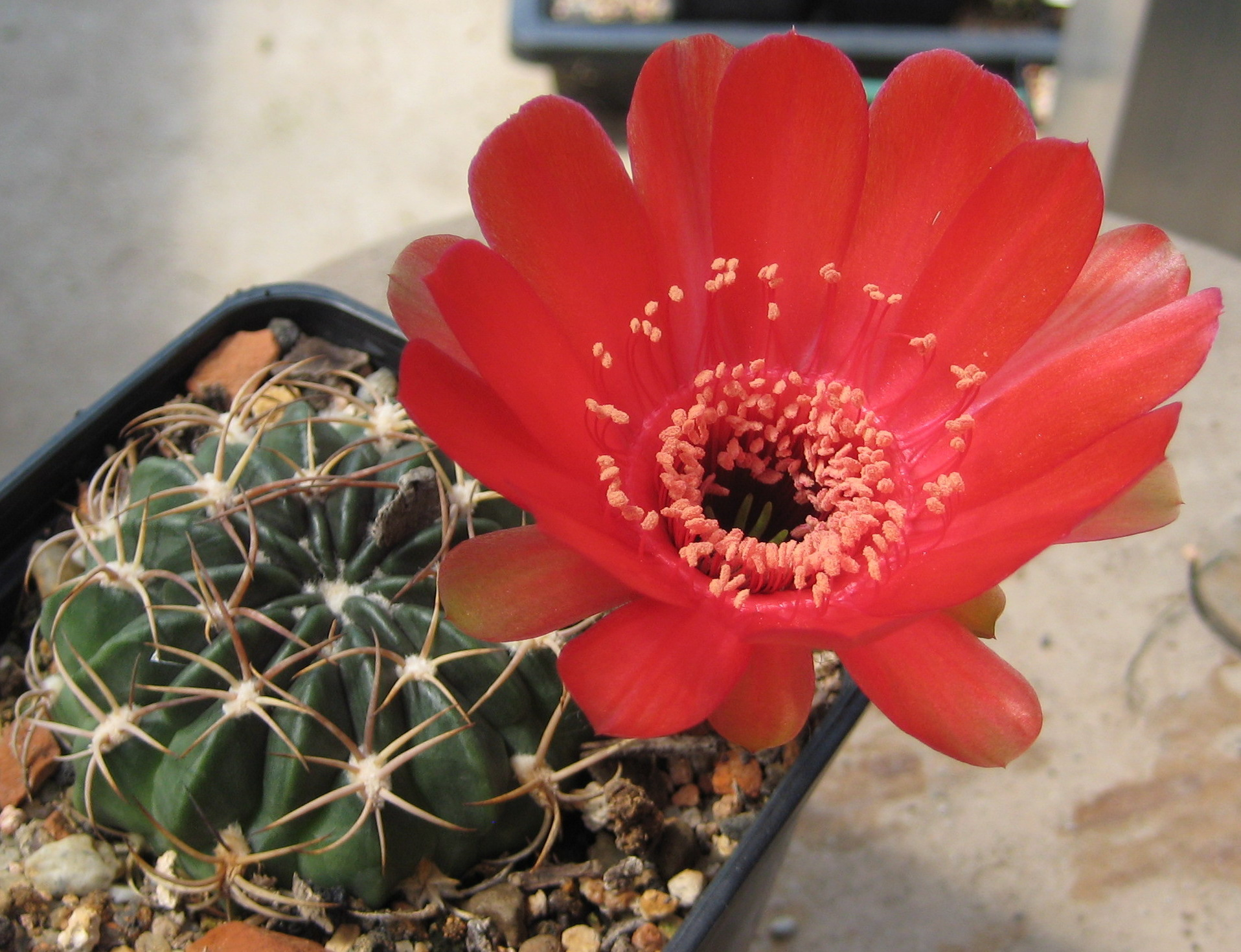

Scientific classification
- Kingdom: Plantae
- Clade: Tracheophytes
- Clade: Angiosperms
- Clade: Eudicots
- Order: Caryophyllales
- Family: Cactaceae
- Subfamily: Cactoideae
- Genus: Echinopsis
- Species: E. calorubra

Binomial name
- Echinopsis calorubra Cárdenas

Synonyms
- List: Echinopsis obrepanda var. calorubra (Cárdenas) Rausch; Echinopsis obrepanda subsp. calorubra (Cárdenas) G.Navarro; Echinopsis rojasii subsp. calorubra (Cárdenas) M.Lowry; Pseudolobivia calorubra (Cárdenas) Backeb.; Echinopsis ancistrophora var. grandiflora (Rausch) Rausch; Echinopsis ancistrophora var. megalocephala (Rausch) Rausch; Echinopsis obrepanda var. aguilari (R.Vásquez) Rausch; Echinopsis rauschii var. grandiflora (Rausch) Friedrich; Echinopsis rauschii var. megalocephala Rausch; Lobivia aguilari R.Vásquez; Lobivia calorubra (Cárdenas) Rausch; Lobivia calorubra var. grandiflora (Rausch) Rausch; Lobivia calorubra var. megalocephala (Rausch) Rausch; Lobivia pojoensis var. grandiflora Rausch

= Echinopsis calorubra =

Species of cactus

Echinopsis calorubra, synonyms including Lobivia calorubra, is a species of Echinopsis found in Bolivia.

== Description ==
Echinopsis calorubra is a type of cactus with stems that can reach heights of 6-7 feet and widths of 14 cm. These stems have 16 ribs and areoles, each bearing a single central spine that can grow up to 2.5 cm long, as well as 9-13 slightly curved radial spines. The flowers of this species are noteworthy for their orange-red upper parts and bluish-pink bases, reaching sizes of up to 15 cm.

== Distribution ==
This species is distributed in the departments of Santa Cruz, Tarija, and Cochabamba. It is found at elevations ranging from 2,400 to 3,000 meters and in grassland environments.
