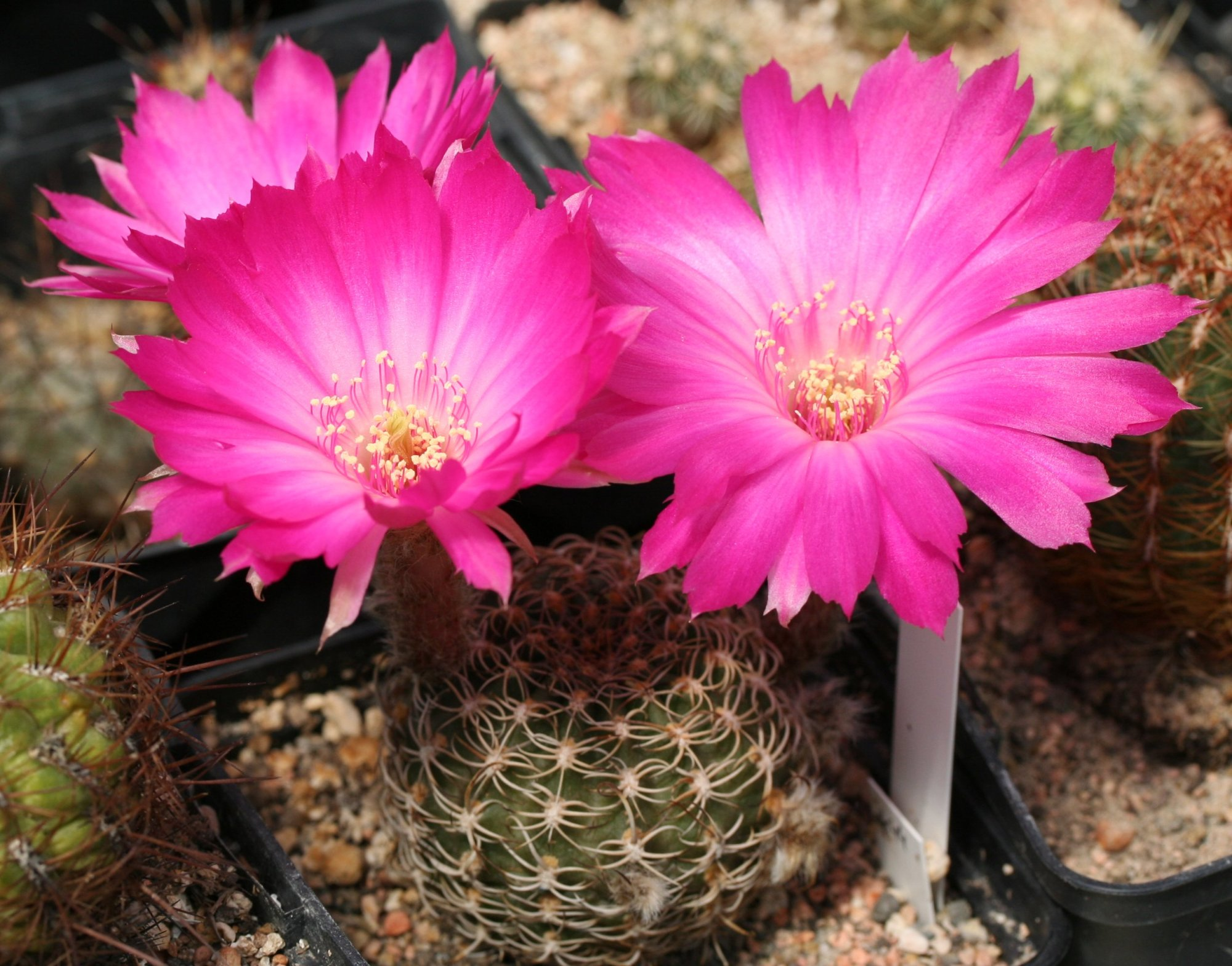
- E. backebergii subsp. backebergii syn. Lobivia winteriana

Conservation status
- Vulnerable (IUCN 3.1)

Scientific classification
- Kingdom: Plantae
- Clade: Embryophytes
- Clade: Tracheophytes
- Clade: Angiosperms
- Clade: Eudicots
- Order: Caryophyllales
- Family: Cactaceae
- Subfamily: Cactoideae
- Genus: Echinopsis
- Species: E. backebergii

Binomial name
- Echinopsis backebergii Werderm.

Synonyms
- Lobivia backebergii (Werderm.) Blatt.

= Echinopsis backebergii =

Species of cactus

Echinopsis backebergii, synonym Lobivia backebergii, is a species of flowering plant in the cactus family Cactaceae, native to Bolivia and Peru.

== Description ==
The spherical to short cylindrical, light green shoots reach a diameter of 4–5 cm (2–2 in) tall and wide, with single or clustered globose stems 4–5 cm thick, with about 15 ribs which are notched, spirally arranged, and covered in grey-brown spines. The areoles on them are initially woolly and hairy and are 1 to 1.5 centimeters apart. One to eleven thorns emerge from them, which cannot always be differentiated into central and peripheral thorns. They are initially brown and turn gray with age. The slender thorns are curved, almost hooky at the tip and 0.5 to 5 centimeters long. Large, showy, light to carmine-red flowers often have a bluish glow and a white throat are borne in summer. They appear on the side near the top of the shoot and open during the day. The flowers are up to 5.5 centimeters long and have a diameter of 4 centimeters. Their flower tube is slender. The small, spherical fruits are semi-dry and tear vertically. As the minimum temperature requirement is 10 °C (50 °F), in temperate regions it must be grown under glass with heat.

== Taxonomy ==
The first description as Echinopsis backebergii by Erich Werdermann was published in 1931. The specific epithet backebergii honors the German cactus specialist Curt Backeberg. Curt Backeberg placed the species in the genus Lobivia in 1935. It has since been returned to Echinopsis.

=== Subspecies ===
As of November 2025, Plants of the World Online accepted two subspecies:

Image	Subspecies	Distribution
	E. backebergii subsp. backebergii	Bolivia (La Paz), Peru (Ayacucho, Cusco and Huancavelica)
	E. backebergii subsp. wrightiana (Backeb.) M.Lowry ex G.D.Rowley	Peru (Huancavelica)

== Distribution ==
Echinopsis backebergii is widespread in the Bolivian departments of La Paz and Cochabamba and the Peruvian regions of Ayacucho, Cusco and Huancavelica in the puna vegetation at altitudes of 3200 to 3900 meters.

== Cultivation ==
E. backebergii subsp. wrightiana has gained the Royal Horticultural Society's Award of Garden Merit.
