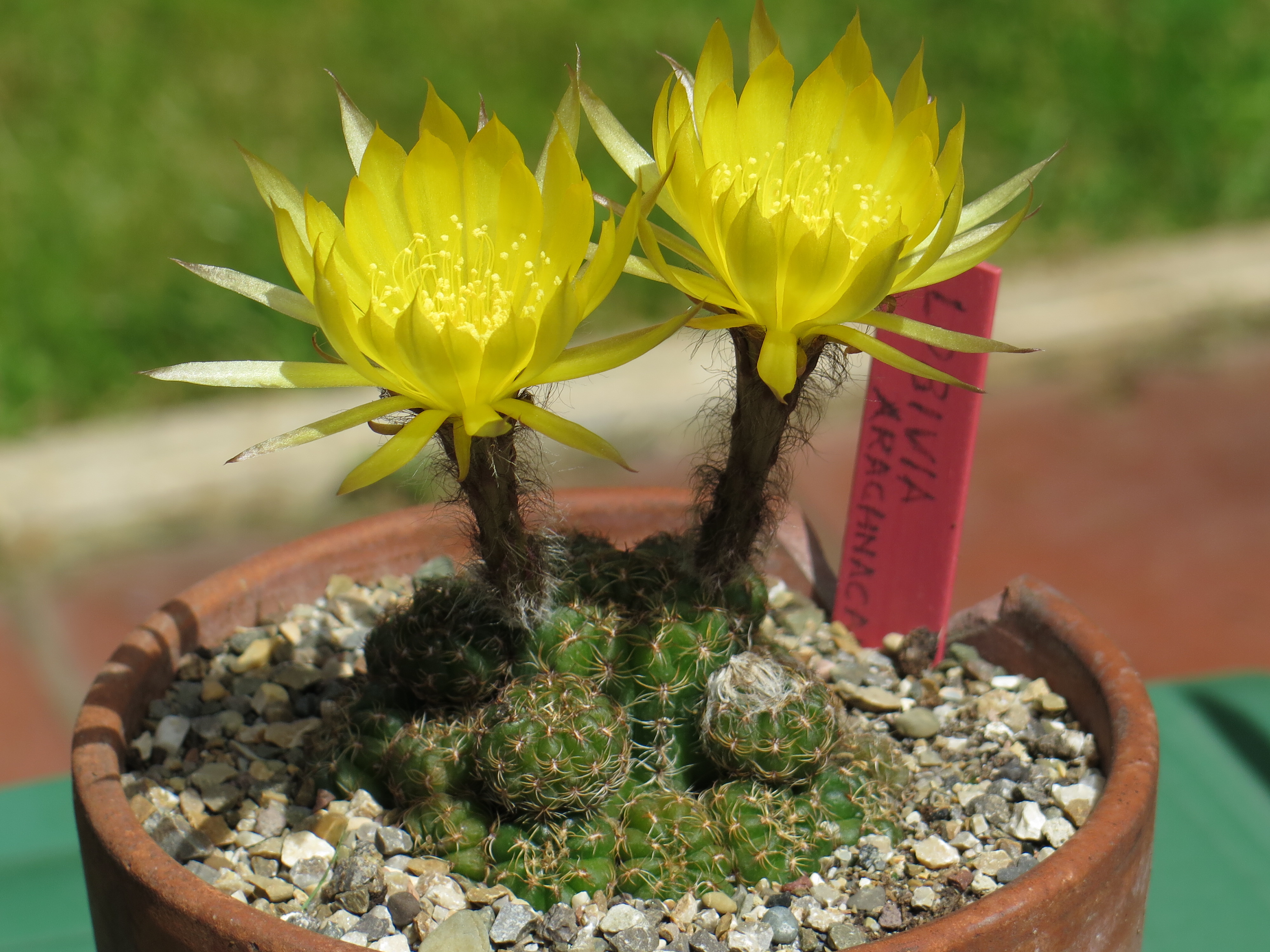
- Echinopsis arachnacantha subsp. arachnacantha

Scientific classification
- Kingdom: Plantae
- Clade: Tracheophytes
- Clade: Angiosperms
- Clade: Eudicots
- Order: Caryophyllales
- Family: Cactaceae
- Subfamily: Cactoideae
- Genus: Echinopsis
- Species: E. arachnacantha

Binomial name
- Echinopsis arachnacantha (Buining & F.Ritter) Friedrich

Synonyms
- Echinopsis ancistrophora subsp. arachnacantha (Buining & F.Ritter) Rausch; Lobivia arachnacantha Buining & F.Ritter

= Echinopsis arachnacantha =

Species of plant

Echinopsis arachnacantha, synonym Lobivia arachnacantha, is a species of cactus in the genus Echinopsis, native to Bolivia.

== Description ==
Echinopsis arachnacantha typically grows in clusters with flattened to spherical stems that are dark green and feature around 14 weakly notched ribs. The areoles on these stems bear 9-15 radial spines measuring 5 mm in length, which can range from pale to dark brown or yellowish-brown, sometimes accompanied by a 1.5 mm long black spine. Its flowers are approximately 5 cm wide and are supported by a slender floral tube that is about 5 cm long.

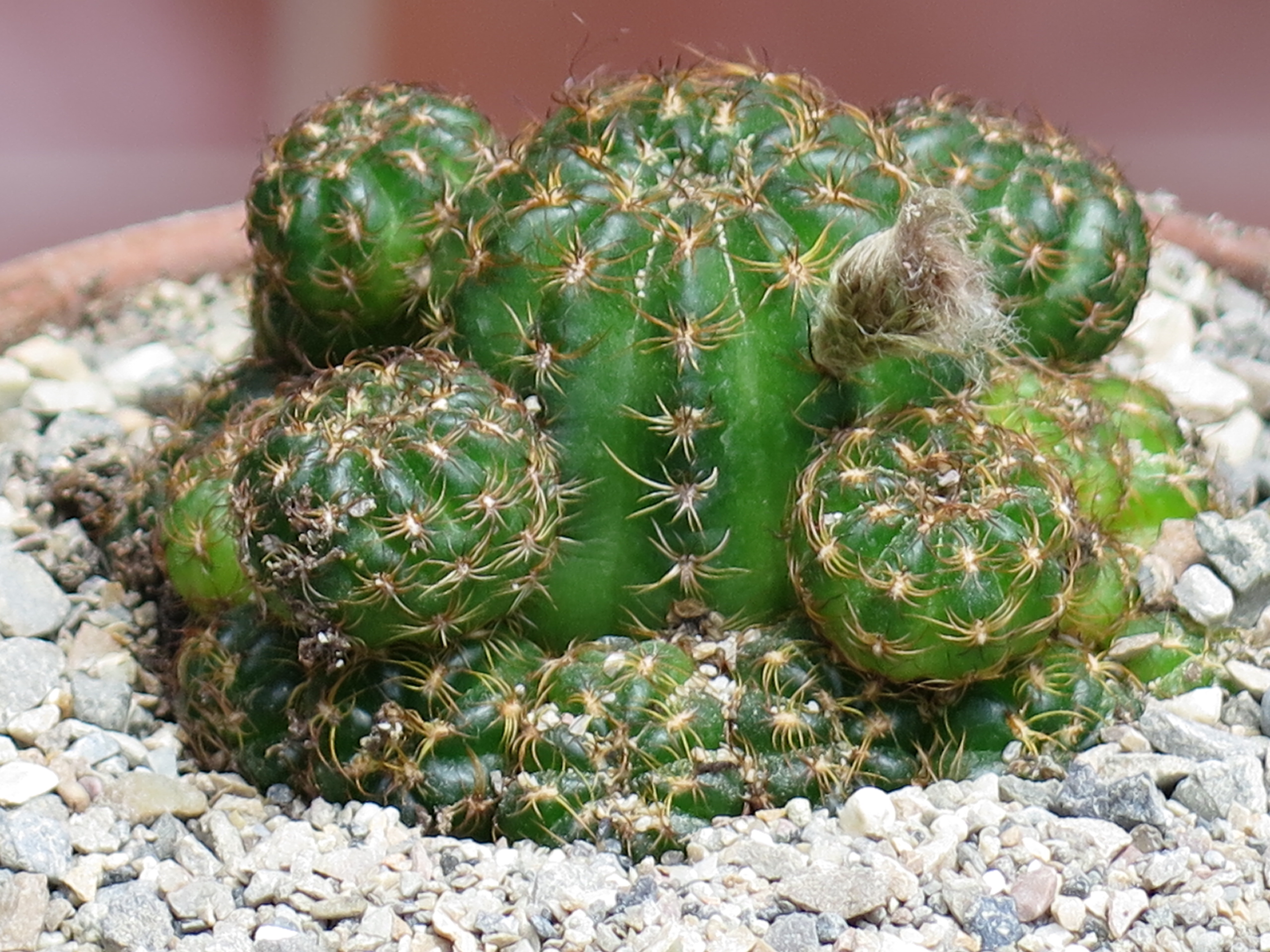
Echinopsis arachnacantha typically forms clumps

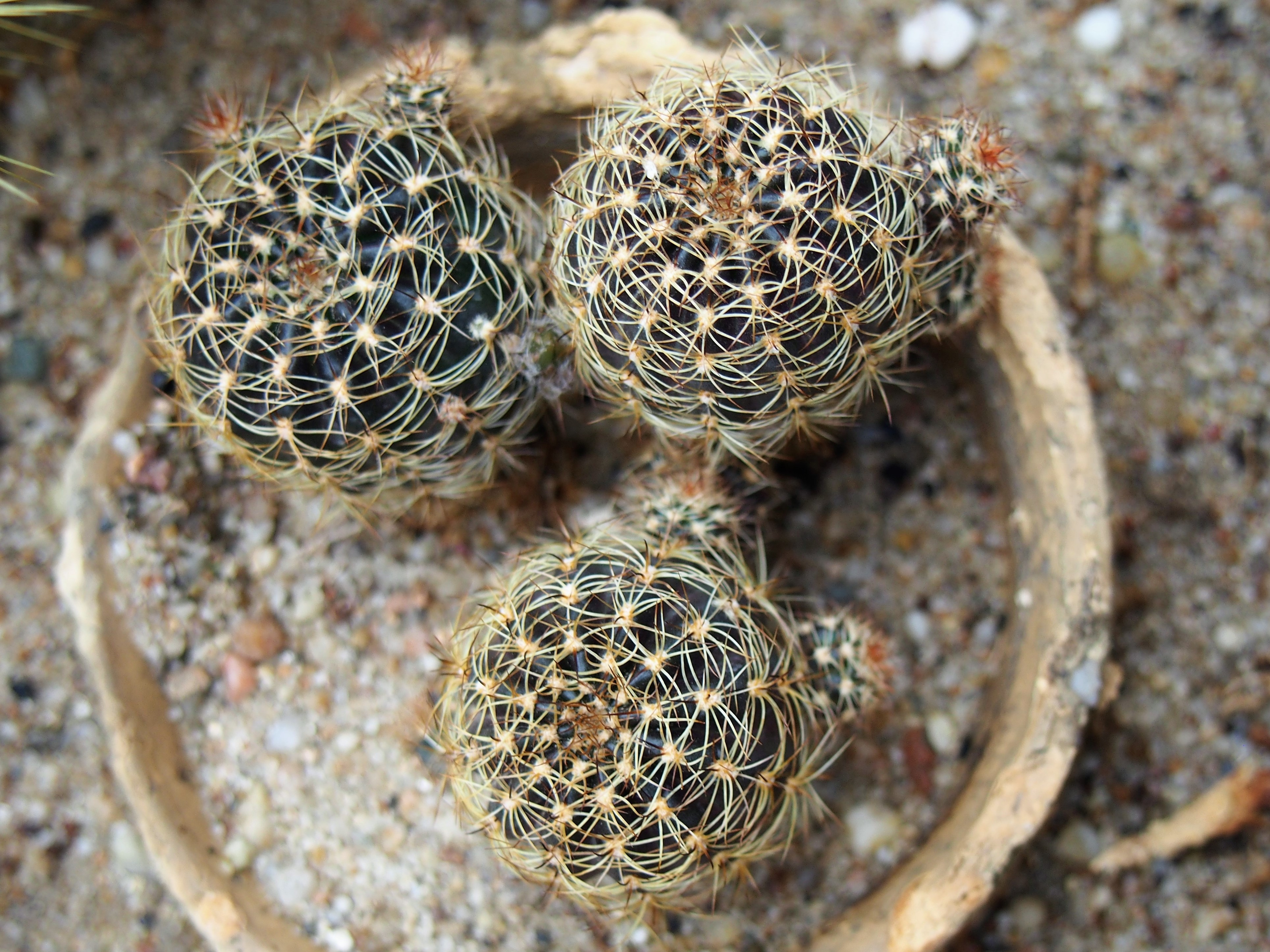

== Taxonomy ==
The species was first described in 1956 as Lobivia arachnacantha.

=== Subspecies ===
As of November 2025, Plants of the World Online accepted the following subspecies:

Image	Subspecies	Distribution
	Echinopsis arachnacantha var. arachnacantha	Bolivia
	Echinopsis arachnacantha var. densiseta Rausch	Bolivia
	Echinopsis arachnacantha var. sulphurea R.Vásquez	Bolivia
	Echinopsis arachnacantha var. torrecillasensis (Cárdenas) Buining	Bolivia

== Distribution ==
Plants are found in Bolivia, in the departments of Santa Cruz, Chuquisaca, and Cochabamba, as well as in Salta, Argentina. It grows at elevations between 1800 and 2600 meters. This species grows on stony hills in places with reliable summer rainfall.

== Cultivation ==
The species has gained the Royal Horticultural Society's Award of Garden Merit.
