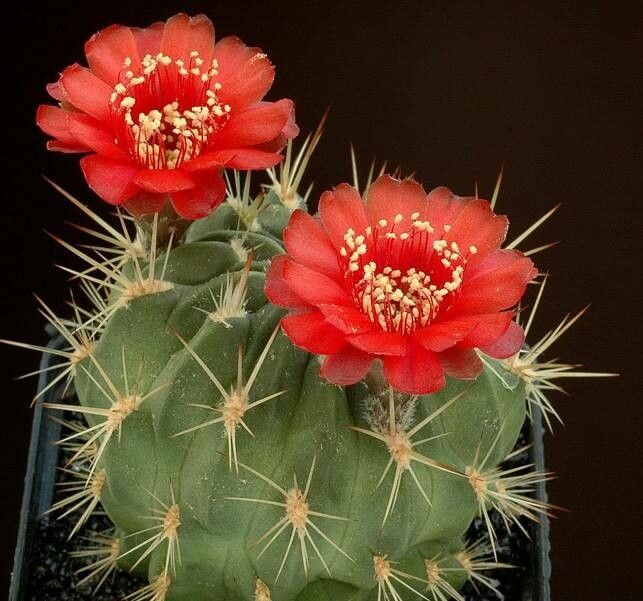

Scientific classification
- Kingdom: Plantae
- Clade: Embryophytes
- Clade: Tracheophytes
- Clade: Spermatophytes
- Clade: Angiosperms
- Clade: Eudicots
- Order: Caryophyllales
- Family: Cactaceae
- Subfamily: Cactoideae
- Genus: Echinopsis
- Species: E. lateritia

Binomial name
- Echinopsis lateritia Gürke

Synonyms
- List: Hymenorebutia cintiensis (Cárdenas) F.Ritter; Hymenorebutia torataensis F.Ritter; Hymenorebutia torreana F.Ritter; Lobivia camataquiensis Cárdenas; Lobivia carminantha Backeb.; Lobivia cintiensis Cárdenas; Lobivia cintiensis var. elongata F.Ritter; Lobivia kupperiana Backeb.; Lobivia lateritia (Gürke) Britton & Rose; Lobivia lateritia var. camataquiensis (Cárdenas) J.Ullmann; Lobivia lateritia var. cintiensis (Cárdenas) J.Ullmann; Lobivia lateritia var. citriflora Rausch; Lobivia lateritia var. cotagaitensis Rausch; Lobivia lateritia var. kupperiana (Backeb.) Rausch; Lobivia pentlandii f. carminantha (Backeb.) J.Ullmann; Lobivia scopulina Backeb.

= Echinopsis lateritia =

Species of cactus

Echinopsis lateritia, synonyms including Lobivia lateritia, is a species of flowering plant in the cactus family Cactaceae, endemic to Bolivia. It was first described by Max Gürke in 1907.
