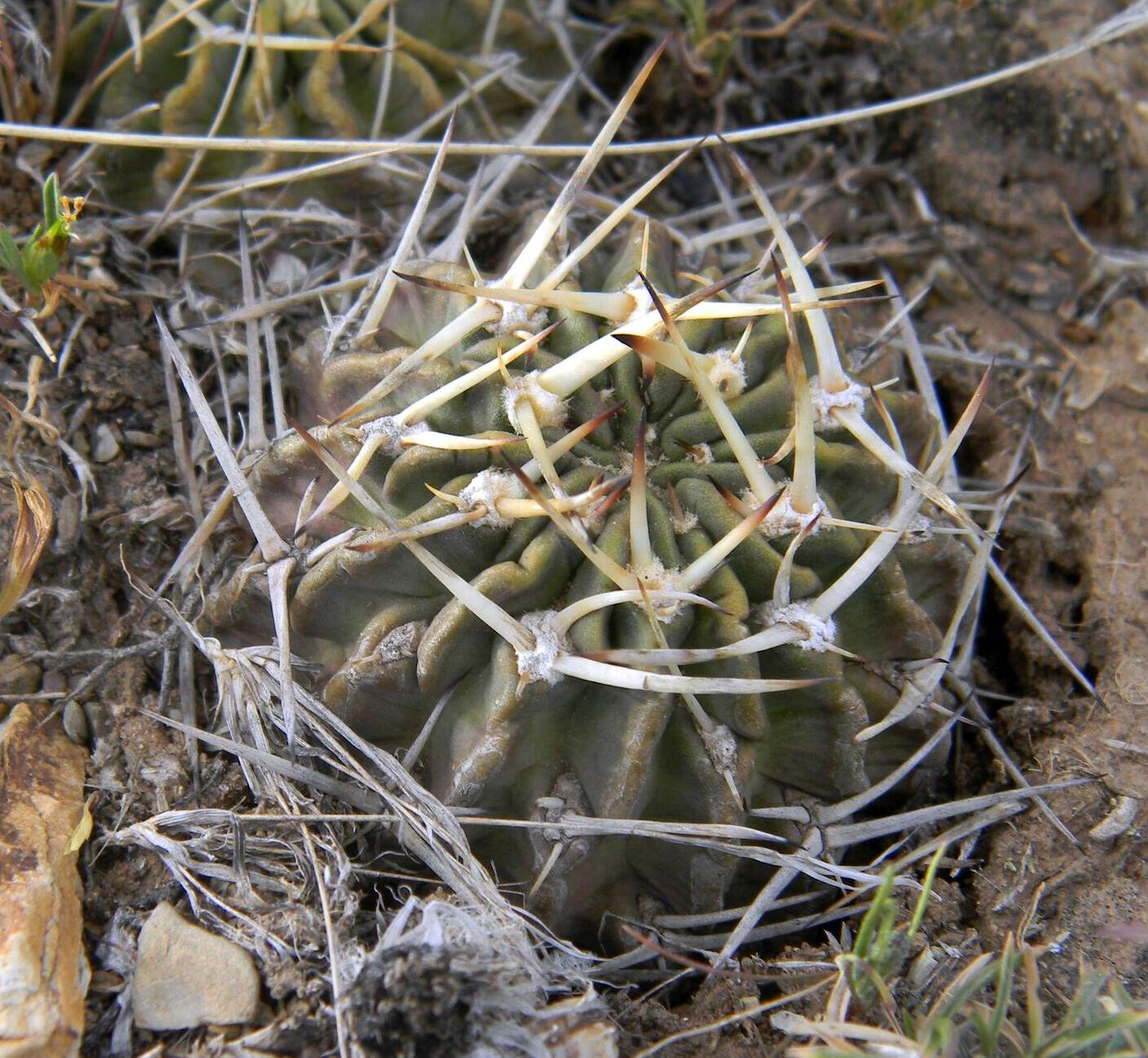

Conservation status
- Least Concern (IUCN 3.1)

Scientific classification
- Kingdom: Plantae
- Clade: Tracheophytes
- Clade: Angiosperms
- Clade: Eudicots
- Order: Caryophyllales
- Family: Cactaceae
- Subfamily: Cactoideae
- Genus: Echinopsis
- Species: E. pugionacantha

Binomial name
- Echinopsis pugionacantha Rose & Boed.

Synonyms
- Lobivia pugionacantha (Rose & Boed.) Backeb.

= Echinopsis pugionacantha =

Species of plant

Echinopsis pugionacantha, synonym Lobivia pugionacantha, is a species of cactus in the genus Echinopsis found in Argentina and Bolivia.

== Description ==
Echinopsis pugionacantha typically grows individually, though it can also form clusters. The shoots are spherical to egg-shaped, with a cloudy gray-green color, reaching heights of 8 to 15 centimeters and diameters of up to 4.5 centimeters. These shoots develop a long taproot and have about 17 ribs. Each shoot bears four to seven light yellow spines, which can be quite variable in shape, sometimes resembling daggers. These spines point sideways and can reach lengths of up to 2.5 centimeters or more.

The flowers of Echinopsis pugionacantha are funnel-shaped and emit a fragrant scent during the day. They come in shades ranging from yellow to pink or orange-red, measuring up to 4.5 centimeters in both length and diameter. The spherical fruits are semi-dry and split open upon maturity.

== Taxonomy ==
The species was first described as Echinopsis pugionacantha in 1931 by Joseph Nelson Rose and Friedrich Bödeker. The specific epithet pugionacantha is a combination of the Latin word pugio, meaning 'dagger', and the Greek word akantha, meaning 'thorn'. Curt Backeberg later reclassified the species under the genus Lobivia in 1936. It has since been restored to Echinopsis.

=== Subspecies ===
Accepted subspecies:

- Echinopsis pugionacantha subsp. haemantha (Rausch) M.Lowry
- Echinopsis pugionacantha subsp. pugionacantha
- Echinopsis pugionacantha subsp. rossii (Boed.) G.Navarro

== Distribution ==
This species is found in the Bolivian regions of Cochabamba, Chuquisaca, Potosí, Tarija, and possibly La Paz, as well as in the Argentine province of Jujuy at altitudes ranging from 3500 to 4000 meters.
