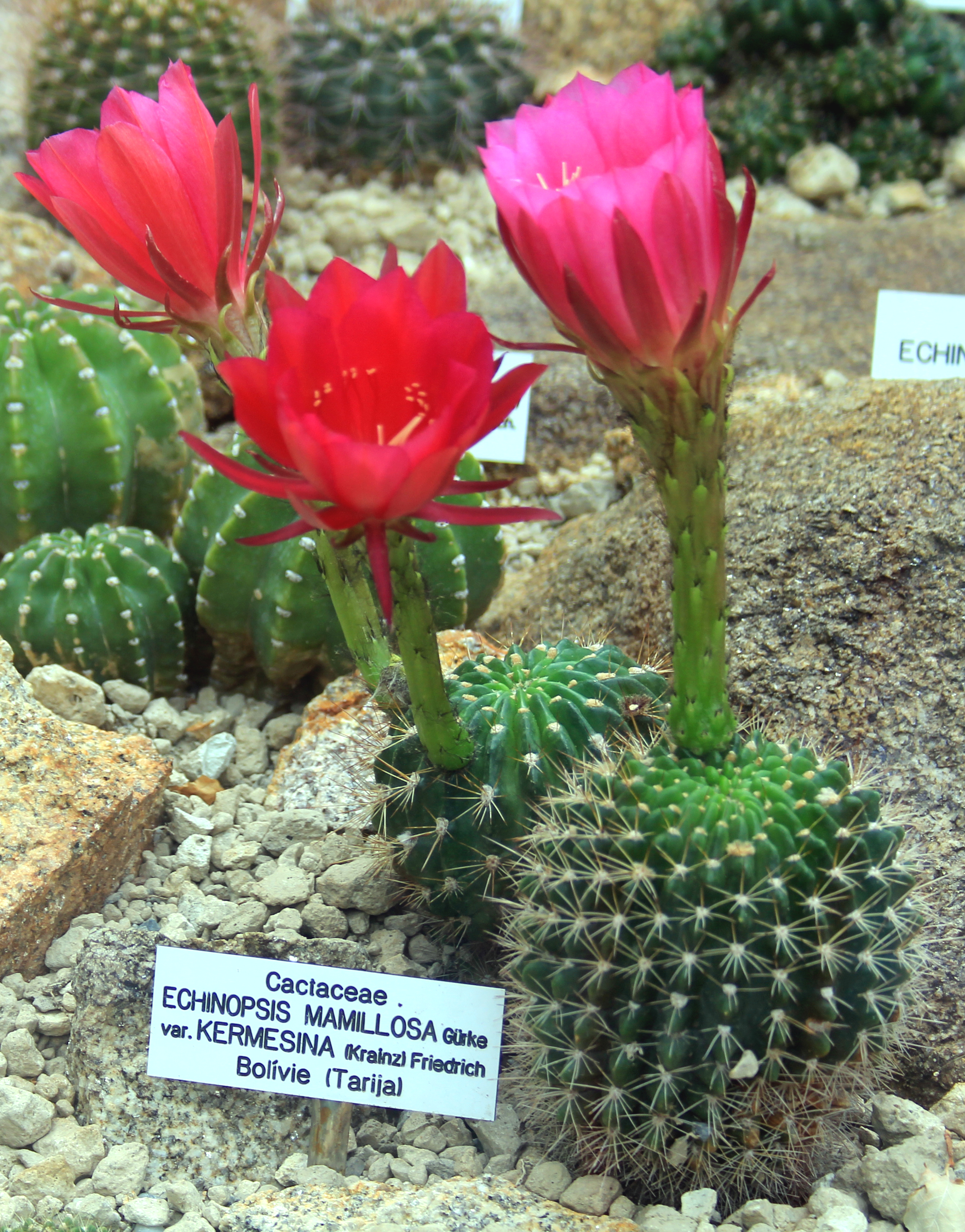
- Growing at the Charles University Botanical Garden in Prague

Scientific classification
- Kingdom: Plantae
- Clade: Embryophytes
- Clade: Tracheophytes
- Clade: Spermatophytes
- Clade: Angiosperms
- Clade: Eudicots
- Order: Caryophyllales
- Family: Cactaceae
- Subfamily: Cactoideae
- Genus: Echinopsis
- Species: E. mamillosa

Binomial name
- Echinopsis mamillosa Gürke

Synonyms
- List: Echinopsis herbasii Cárdenas; Echinopsis kermesina (Krainz) Krainz; Echinopsis mamillosa subsp. silvatica (F.Ritter) P.J.Braun & Esteves; Echinopsis mamillosa var. flexilis Rausch; Echinopsis mamillosa var. kermesina (Krainz) Friedrich; Echinopsis orozasana F.Ritter; Echinopsis ritteri Boed.; Echinopsis roseolilacina Cárdenas; Echinopsis silvatica F.Ritter; Lobivia mamillosa (Gürke) Schlumpb.; Pseudolobivia kermesina Krainz; Pseudolobivia orozasana (F.Ritter) Backeb.

= Echinopsis mamillosa =

Species of cactus

Echinopsis mamillosa, synonym Lobivia mamillosa, is a species of cactus from Bolivia and northwest Argentina.

== Description ==
Echinopsis mamillosa has a solitary growth habit, with globe-shaped stems up to 30 cm (12 in) tall. The stems are dark green, with a diameter of up 8 cm (3.1 in) across, and have 13–17 deep ribs, formed into tubercles. The rounded areoles are spaced up to 12 mm (0.5 in) and produce yellowish spines with brown tips, the one to four central spines being up to 10 mm (0.4 in) long and the 8–12 radial spines 5–10 mm (0.2–0.4 in) long. The flowers are white with rose tips. They are large in relation to the diameter of the stems, up to 8 cm (3.1 in) across and 13–18 cm (5.1–7.1 in) long.

== Taxonomy ==
Echinopsis mamillosa was first described in 1907 by the German botanist Max Gürke. It was transferred to the genus Lobivia by Boris Oliver Schlumpberger in 2012. As of November 2025, Plants of the World Online accepted the earlier placement in Echinopsis.

Two subspecies have been recognized. Subspecies mamillosa is shorter (typically only up to 6 cm (2 in) tall) with 17 ribs. Subspecies silvatica is taller and has fewer ribs. As of November 2025, neither is recognized by Plants of the World Online.

== Distribution ==
Lobivia mamillosa is widespread in the Bolivian departments of Chuquisaca and Tarija at altitudes of 1500 to 3000 meters.
