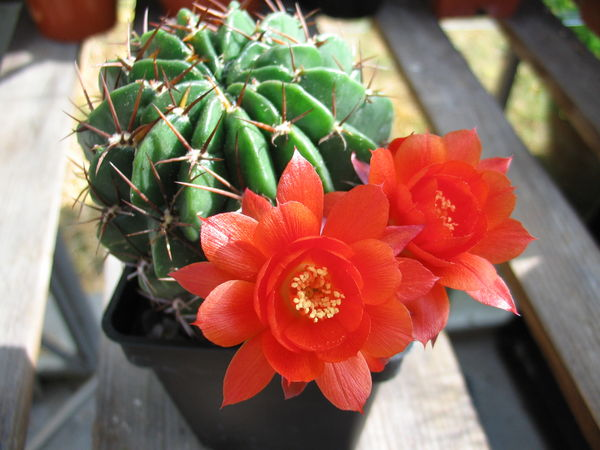

Conservation status
- Least Concern (IUCN 3.1)

Scientific classification
- Kingdom: Plantae
- Clade: Tracheophytes
- Clade: Angiosperms
- Clade: Eudicots
- Order: Caryophyllales
- Family: Cactaceae
- Subfamily: Cactoideae
- Genus: Echinopsis
- Species: E. maximiliana

Binomial name
- Echinopsis maximiliana Heyder ex A.Dietr.

Subspecies
- See text.

Synonyms
- Lobivia maximiliana (Heyder ex A.Dietr.) Backeb. ex Rausch

= Echinopsis maximiliana =

Species of cactus

Echinopsis maximiliana, synonym Lobivia maximiliana, is a species of Echinopsis found in Bolivia and Peru.

== Description ==
Echinopsis maximiliana usually forms small cushions. The spherical to short cylindrical, green shoots reach a diameter of 5 centimeters and a height of up to 20 centimeters. There are twelve to 20 straight ribs that are notched and tuberous. The areoles on them are whitish and are up to 2 centimeters apart. The four to twelve thorns that arise from them, which can rarely be missing, are very variable. As a rule, they cannot be differentiated into central and peripheral spines. The unequal, curved spines are brownish to yellowish and 3 to 5 centimeters long.

The short to long tube-funnel-shaped flowers appear laterally on the upper parts of the shoots. They are red with an orange-yellow throat, or sometimes yellow or pink to purple. The flowers are 4 to 10 centimeters long and have the same diameter. The reddish green fruits are hairy and reach a diameter of up to 1.2 centimeters

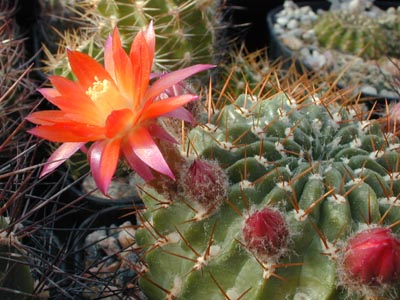

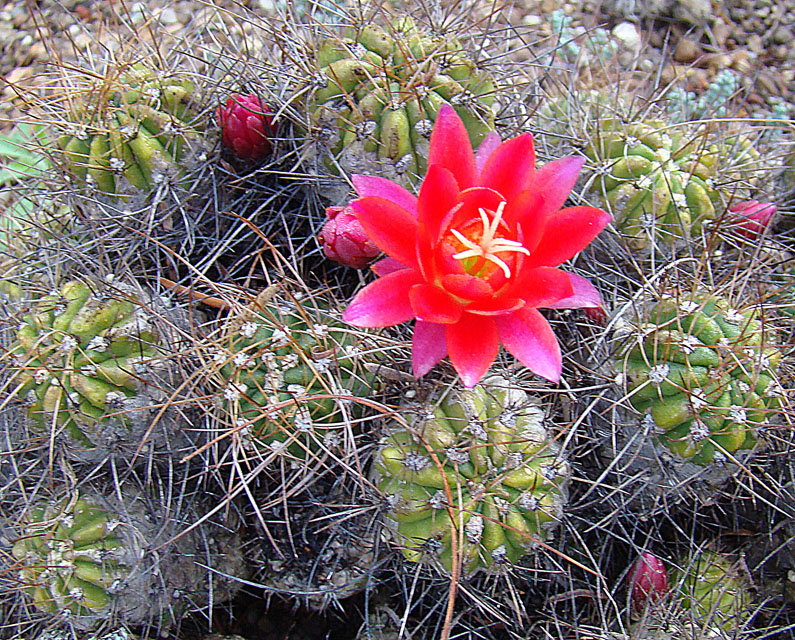

== Taxonomy ==
The first description as Echinopsis maximiliana by Albert Gottfried Dietrich was published in 1846, with the name attributed to Edward Heyder. The specific epithet maximiliana honors a friend of Heyder's who died too early named Maximilian. The species was transferred to the genus Lobivia in 1975. As of November 2025, Plants of the World Online accepted the earlier placement in Echinopsis.

=== Subspecies ===
As of November 2025, Plants of the World Online accepted three subspecies:

- Echinopsis maximiliana subsp. caespitosa (J.A.Purpus) M.Lowry
- Echinopsis maximiliana subsp. maximiliana
- Echinopsis maximiliana subsp. westii (Hutchison) M.Lowry

== Distribution ==
Echinopsis maximiliana is widespread in the Peruvian regions of Apurímac, Cusco and Puno as well as in the Bolivian departments of La Paz and Cochabamba in the Lake Titicaca basin at altitudes of 3000 to 4800 meters.
