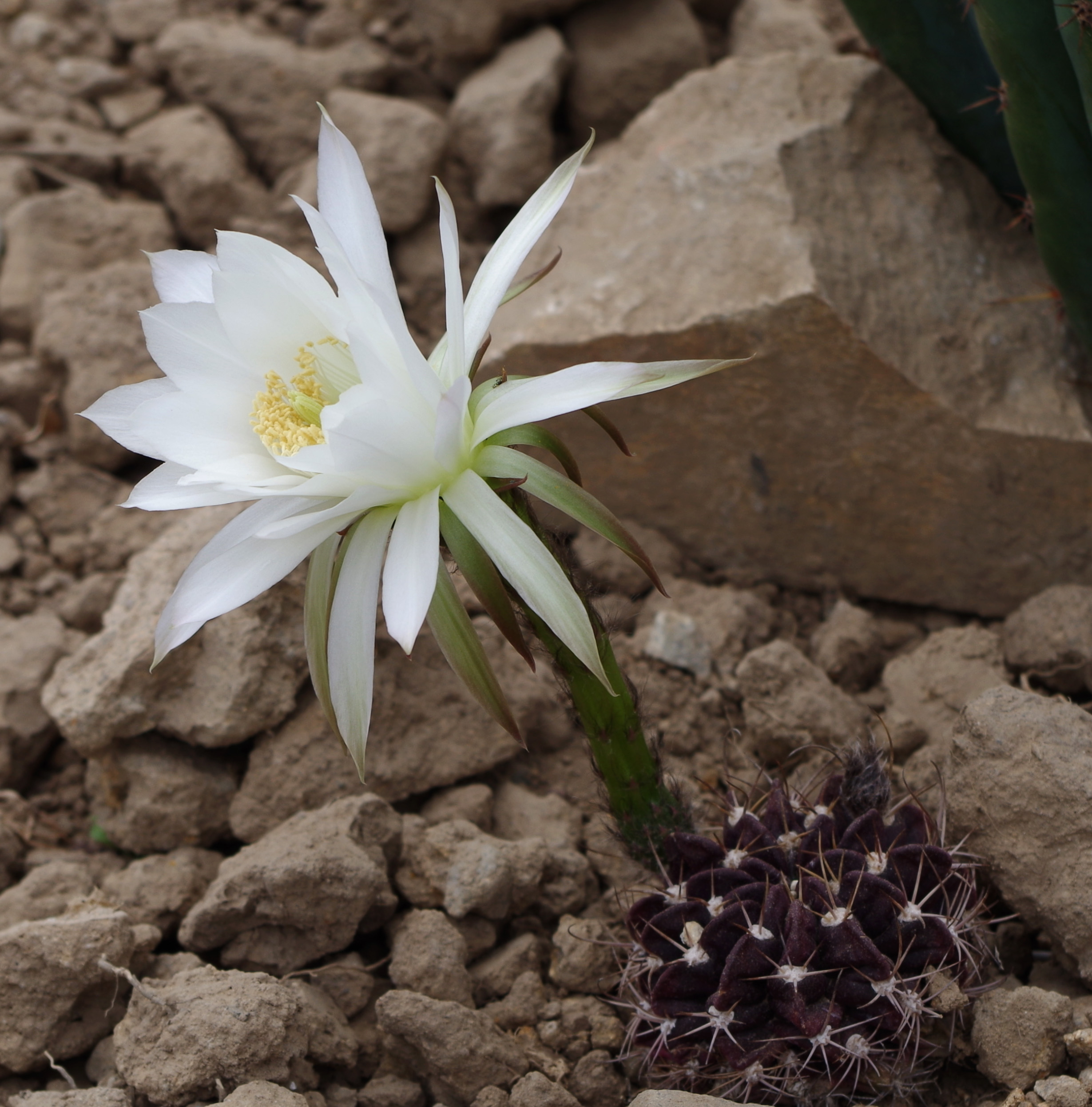

Conservation status
- Least Concern (IUCN 3.1)

Scientific classification
- Kingdom: Plantae
- Clade: Tracheophytes
- Clade: Angiosperms
- Clade: Eudicots
- Order: Caryophyllales
- Family: Cactaceae
- Subfamily: Cactoideae
- Genus: Echinopsis
- Species: E. obrepanda

Binomial name
- Echinopsis obrepanda (Salm-Dyck) K.Schum.

Synonyms
- List: Echinocactus obrepandus Salm-Dyck; Pseudolobivia obrepanda (Salm-Dyck) Backeb.; Cereus cristatus (Salm-Dyck) Mottet; Echinocactus misleyi J.F.Cels; Echinopsis cajasensis F.Ritter; Echinopsis calliantholilacina Cárdenas; Echinopsis callichroma Cárdenas; Echinopsis carmineiflora (Hoffm. & Backeb.) Friedrich; Echinopsis cristata Salm-Dyck; Echinopsis cristata var. purpurea Hook.; Echinopsis fiebrigii Gürke; Echinopsis hystrichoides F.Ritter; Echinopsis ibicuatensis Cárdenas; Echinopsis mamillosa var. hystrichoides (F.Ritter) J.Ullmann; Echinopsis mataranensis Cárdenas; Echinopsis millarensis Rausch; Echinopsis misleyi Labour.; Echinopsis obrepanda var. fiebrigii (Gürke) Friedrich; Echinopsis obrepanda var. mizquensis (Rausch) Rausch; Echinopsis pseudomamillosa Cárdenas; Echinopsis riviere-de-caraltii Cárdenas; Echinopsis toralapana Cárdenas; Lobivia calliantholilacina (Cárdenas) Lodé; Lobivia callichroma (Cárdenas) Lodé; Lobivia calorubra var. mizquensis (Rausch) Rausch; Lobivia obrepanda (Salm-Dyck) Schlumpb.; Lobivia mizquensis Rausch; Pseudolobivia callichroma (Cárdenas) Backeb.; Pseudolobivia carmineoflora Hoffm. & Backeb.; Pseudolobivia fiebrigii (Gürke) Backeb.; Pseudolobivia obrepanda var. fiebrigii (Gürke) Backeb.; Pseudolobivia toralapana (Cárdenas) Backeb.

= Echinopsis obrepanda =

Species of cactus

Echinopsis obrepanda, synonyms including Lobivia obrepanda, is a species of Echinopsis found in Bolivia.

== Description ==
Echinopsis obrepanda usually grows singly and occasionally forms small groups as it gets older. The depressed, spherical, dark or gray-green shoots reach a diameter of up to 20 centimeters. There are 13 to 18 sharp-edged ribs, which are divided into hatchet-shaped cusps. The gray areoles are located in the notches and are about 2 centimeters apart. Slightly curved, white to brownish thorns emerge from them. The one to three central spines, which can occasionally be missing, are curved at the tip and 2 to 5 centimeters long. The six to 13 marginal spines, which are mostly arranged in a comb shape, are up to 1 centimeter long.

The funnel-shaped, parsley-scented, white to magenta-red flowers open at night. They are 10 to 20 centimeters long. Its flower tube is slightly curved. The outer bracts are spread out, the inner ones curve upwards. The spherical fruits are semi-dry.

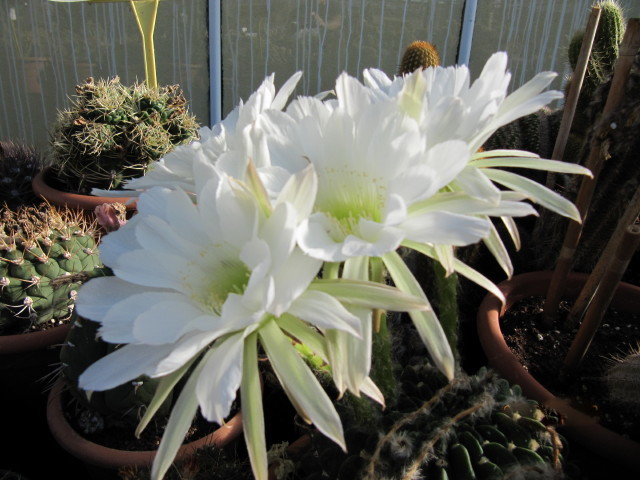
Flowers

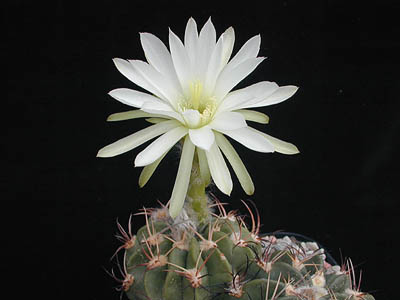

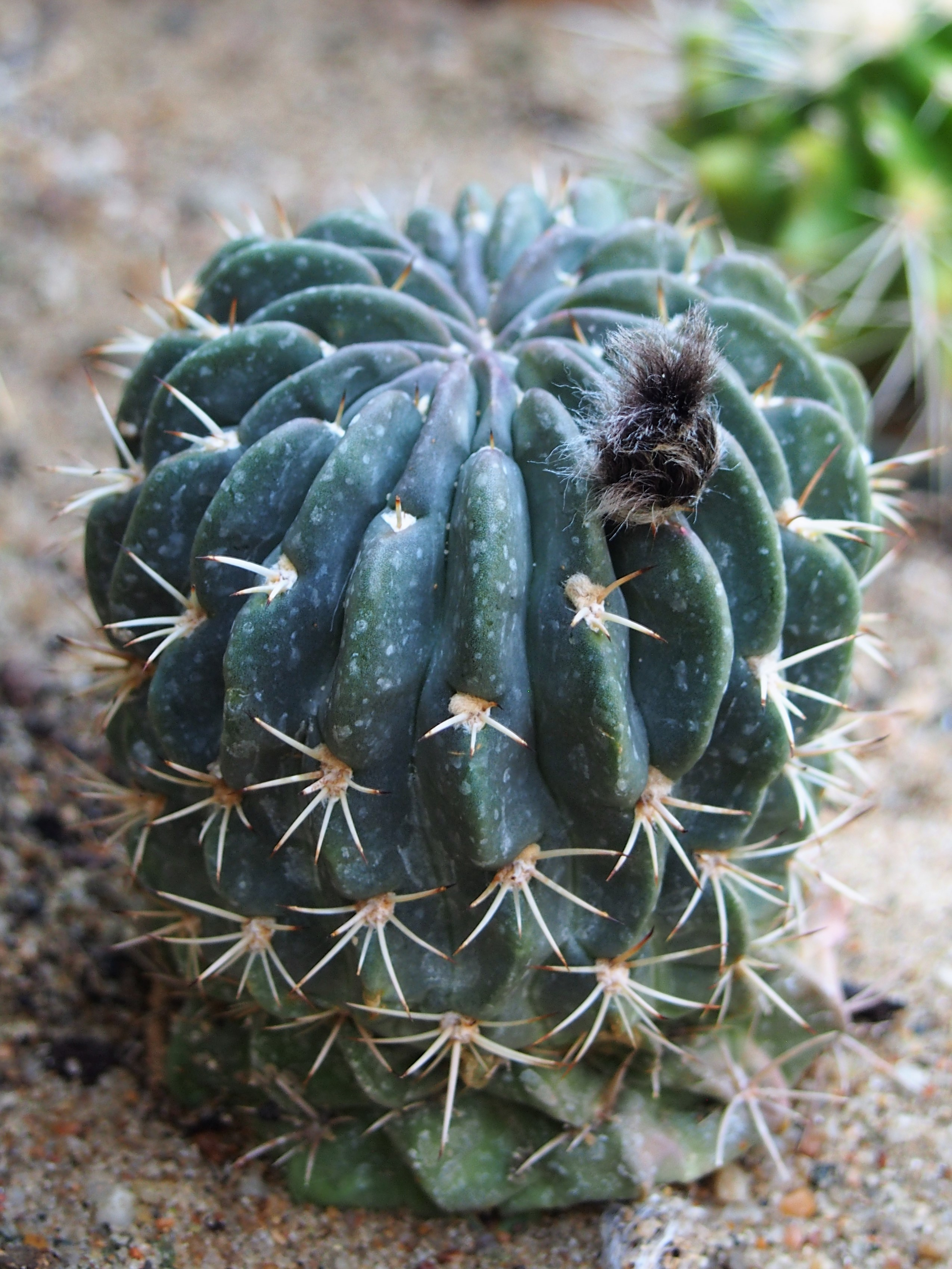

== Taxonomy ==
The species was first described by Joseph zu Salm-Reifferscheidt-Dyck in 1845 as Echinocactus obrepandus. The specific epithet obrepandus is derived from the Latin words ob- for 'reverse' and repandus for 'dissolute' and refers to the humps of the ribs. Karl Moritz Schumann transferred the species to the genus Echinopsis in 1894, and Boris O. Schlumpberger transferred it to Lobivia in 2012. As of November 2025, Plants of the World Online accepted the placement in Echinopsis.

== Distribution ==
Echinopsis obrepanda is distributed in the Bolivian departments of Santa Cruz, Cochabamba and Chuquisaca at low to high altitudes.
