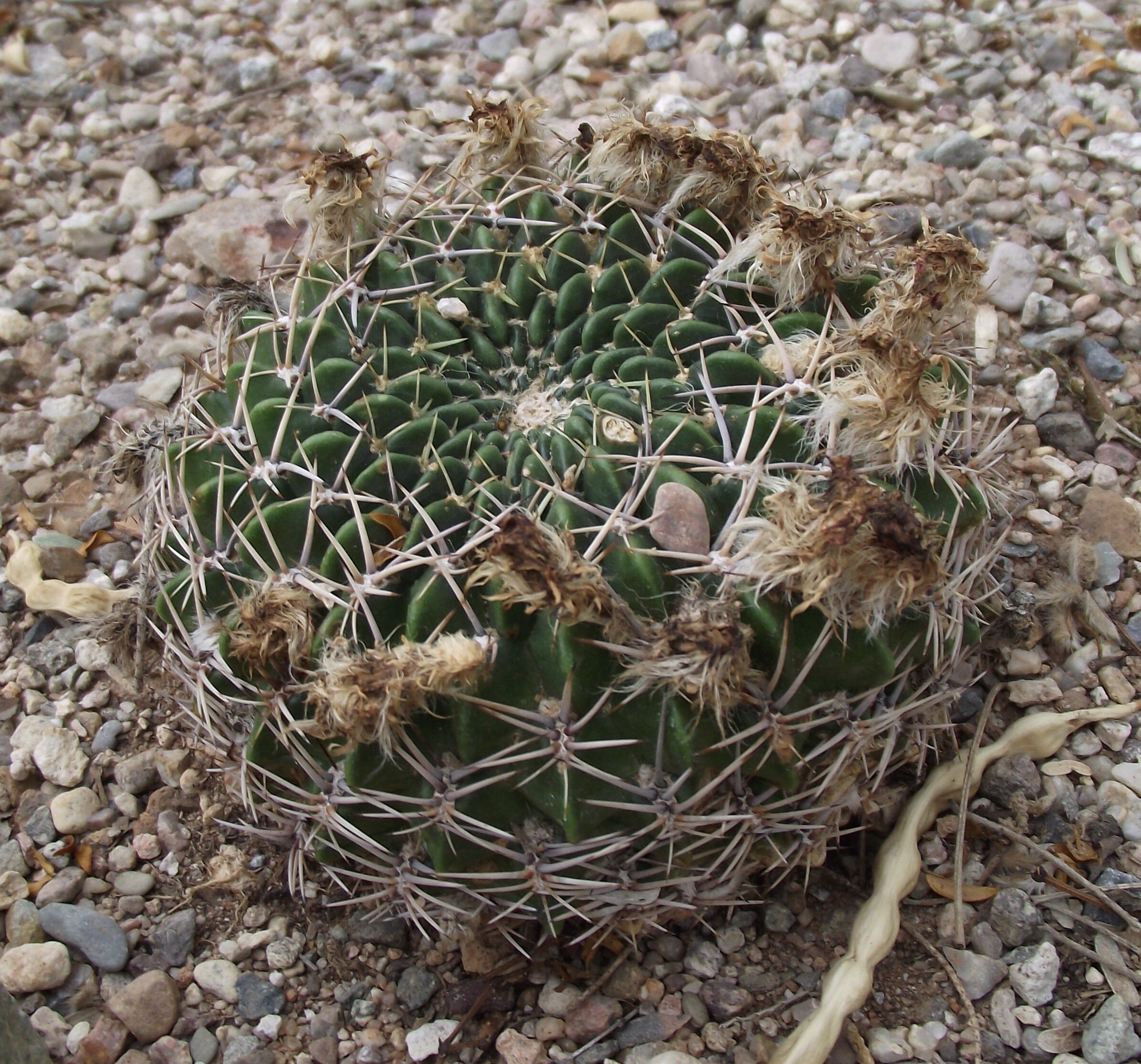

Conservation status
- Least Concern (IUCN 3.1)

Scientific classification
- Kingdom: Plantae
- Clade: Tracheophytes
- Clade: Angiosperms
- Clade: Eudicots
- Order: Caryophyllales
- Family: Cactaceae
- Subfamily: Cactoideae
- Genus: Echinopsis
- Species: E. cinnabarina

Binomial name
- Echinopsis cinnabarina (Hook.) Labour.

Synonyms
- List: Cinnabarinea cinnabarina (Hook.) Frič ex F.Ritter; Echinocactus cinnabarinus Hook. i1847; Echinocereus cinnabarinus (Hook.) K.Schum.; Cinnabarinea prestoana (Cárdenas) F.Ritter; Cinnabarinea walterspielii (Boed.) F.Ritter; Cinnabarinea walterspielii var. sanguiniflora F.Ritter; Cinnabarinea zudanensis (Cárdenas) F.Ritter; Echinocactus cinnabarinus var. spinosior Salm-Dyck; Echinopsis cinnabarina var. cheroniana Fernald; Echinopsis cinnabarina var. cristata Keay; Echinopsis cinnabarina var. scheeriana Rud.Mey.; Echinopsis cinnabarina var. spinosior Rümpler; Lobivia acanthoplegma (Backeb.) Backeb.; Lobivia acanthoplegma f. neocinnabarina (Backeb.) J.Ullmann; Lobivia acanthoplegma var. patula Rausch; Lobivia acanthoplegma f. patula (Rausch) J.Ullmann; Lobivia acanthoplegma var. pilosa Rausch; Lobivia acanthoplegma f. pseudocinnabarina (Backeb.) J.Ullmann; Lobivia acanthoplegma var. roseiflora Rausch; Lobivia acanthoplegma f. taratensis (Cárdenas) J.Ullmann; Lobivia charcasina Cárdenas; Echinopsis cinnabarina (Hook.) Labour.; Lobivia cinnabarina subsp. acanthoplegma (Backeb.) Rausch; Lobivia cinnabarina var. acanthoplegma (Backeb.) Rausch; Lobivia cinnabarina f. charcasina (Cárdenas) J.Ullmann; Lobivia cinnabarina subvar. draxleriana (Rausch) Rausch; Lobivia cinnabarina var. draxleriana (Rausch) Rausch; Lobivia cinnabarina var. grandiflora Rausch 972; Lobivia cinnabarina subvar. neocinnabarina (Backeb.) Rausch; Lobivia cinnabarina var. prestoana (Cárdenas) J.Ullmann; Lobivia cinnabarina subsp. prestoana (Cárdenas) Rausch; Lobivia cinnabarina var. prestoana (Cárdenas) Rausch; Lobivia cinnabarina var. spinosior (Salm-Dyck) Y.Itô; Lobivia cinnabarina subsp. taratensis (Cárdenas) G.D.Rowley; Lobivia cinnabarina var. walterspielii (Boed.) Rausch; Lobivia cinnabarina subvar. walterspielii (Boed.) Rausch; Lobivia cinnabarina subvar. zudanensis (Cárdenas) Rausch; Lobivia cinnabarina var. zudanensis (Cárdenas) Rausch; Lobivia draxleriana Rausch; Lobivia neocinnabarina Backeb.; Lobivia prestoana Cárdenas; Lobivia prestoana var. draxleriana (Rausch) Šída; Lobivia pseudocinnabarina Backeb.; Lobivia rossii var. walterspielii (Boed.) Backeb.; Lobivia taratensis Cárdenas; Lobivia taratensis var. leucosiphus Cárdenas; Lobivia walterspielii Boed.; Lobivia zudanensis Cárdenas; Pseudolobivia acanthoplegma Backeb.; Weingartia jarmilae Halda & Horáček

= Echinopsis cinnabarina =

Species of cactus

Echinopsis cinnabarina, synonyms including Lobivia cinnabarina, is a species of cactus first described in 1847.

== Description ==
Echinopsis cinnabarina grows singly with flattened, spherical, bright green shoots that reach a diameter of up to 15 centimetres (5.9 in). The shoot apex is depressed and not thorny. There are around 20 irregular and crooked ribs, which are clearly divided into crooked cusps. The two to three central spines are slightly curved. The eight to twelve slender marginal spines are slightly curved and 0.6 centimetres (0.24 in) to 1.2 centimetres (0.47 in) long.

The bell-shaped, funnel-shaped scarlet flowers appear on the side or on the shoot shoulder and open during the day. They reach a diameter of up to 4 centimetres (1.6 in).

== Taxonomy ==
The specie was first described by William Jackson Hooker in 1847 as Echinocactus cinnabarinus. The specific epithet cinnabarina comes from Latin, means 'vermilion red' and refers to the color of the flowers. The species was moved to the genus Echinopsis in 1853. In 1922, Nathaniel Lord Britton and Joseph Nelson Rose placed the species in the genus Lobivia. As of November 2025, Plants of the World Online accepted the placement in Echinopsis. The species has many other synonyms.

== Distribution ==
Echinopsis cinnabarina is widespread in the Bolivian departments of Cochabamba, Potosí and Chuquisaca, in the Andes at elevations between 2500 and 3400 meters.
