= David Hunt (botanist) =

English botanist and taxonomist

David Richard Hunt (25 September 1938 – 20 May 2019) was an English botanist and taxonomist. He was a specialist in cacti and the spiderwort family. He notably compiled the 1999 CITES Cactaceae Checklist.

== Personal life ==
Hunt was married to organist Margaret Phillips and co-founder of the English Organ School and Museum in Milborne Port.

== Life and work ==
Hunt received a Bachelor of Arts (BA) degree from the University of Cambridge in 1959 and a Master of Arts (MA) degree in 1963. In 1983 he received a doctoral degree (PhD) from the University of Reading.

Hunt worked at the Royal Botanic Gardens in Kew. He was from 1968 to 1982 editor of the journal Curtis's Botanical Magazine. From 1964 to 2005 he was on the Conifer Nomenclature Committee of the Royal Horticultural Society. From 1974 to 1994, he was Secretary and/or Publisher of the International Organisation for Succulent Research. From 1990 to 2003 he was a member of the Council and Scientific Committee of the International Dendrology Society and editor of the Council from 1992 to 1995. From 1989 to 1991 he worked in the Council of Management of the Cornwall Gardens Trust.

His specialities were the plant families Cacti (Cactaceae) and Commelinaceae (Commelinaceae).

== Honours ==
The species epithet of the carnivorous plant Utricularia huntii from the genus of bladderworts has been awarded in his honour.

== Selected publications ==
Volume 13 of the Flora Novo-Galiciana, published by R. McVaugh, Hunt contributed the chapter on the plant family Commelinaceae (University of Michigan Herbarium, pages 130–201). To volume 6 of the flora mesoamericana (subtitle "Alismataceae to Cyperacaea", first published in March 1994) he also contributed the chapter on the plant family Commelinaceae. He also contributed to the published by WD Stevens at the Missouri Botanical Garden Press Flora de Nicaragua for the 2001 volume 1 published the chapter Commelinaceae (pages 638–650). Here is an overview of some of his writings:

- David Hunt (1967), J. Hutchinson (ed.), "Cactaceae", The Genera of Flowering Plants (in German), Oxford University Press
- Wilhelm Barthlott, David Hunt (1993), K. Kubitzki (ed.), "Cactaceae", The Families and Genera of Vascular Plants (in German), Springer Verlag, pp. 161–196
- David Hunt (1999), CITES Cactaceae Checklist (in German), Kew, England: Royal Botanic Gardens Kew
- Wilhelm Barthlott, David Hunt (2000), "Seed-diversity in the Cactaceae subfam. Cactoideae", Succulent Plant Research (in German), vol. 5
- David Hunt (2002), "That's Opuntia, that was!", Succulent Plant Research (in German), vol. 6, pp. 245–249
- David Hunt; Nigel Taylor; Graham Charles, eds. (2006), The New Cactus Lexicon. Descriptions and Illustrations of the Cactus Family (in German)

== Sources ==
- Robert Zander (1984), Handwörterbuch der Pflanzennamen (in German) (13th ed.), Stuttgart: Ulmer Verlag, ISBN 3-8001-5042-5
- "Hunt, David R.", Short profile at kew.org.
