= Echinocereus engelmannii =

Conservation status
- Least Concern (IUCN 3.1)

Scientific classification
- Kingdom: Plantae
- Clade: Tracheophytes
- Clade: Angiosperms
- Clade: Eudicots
- Order: Caryophyllales
- Family: Cactaceae
- Subfamily: Cactoideae
- Genus: Echinocereus
- Species: E. engelmannii

Binomial name
- Echinocereus engelmannii (Parry ex Engelm.) Lem.

Synonyms
- Cereus engelmannii Parry 1852; Pilocereus engelmannii (Parry ex Engelm.) Lem. 1862

Species of cactus

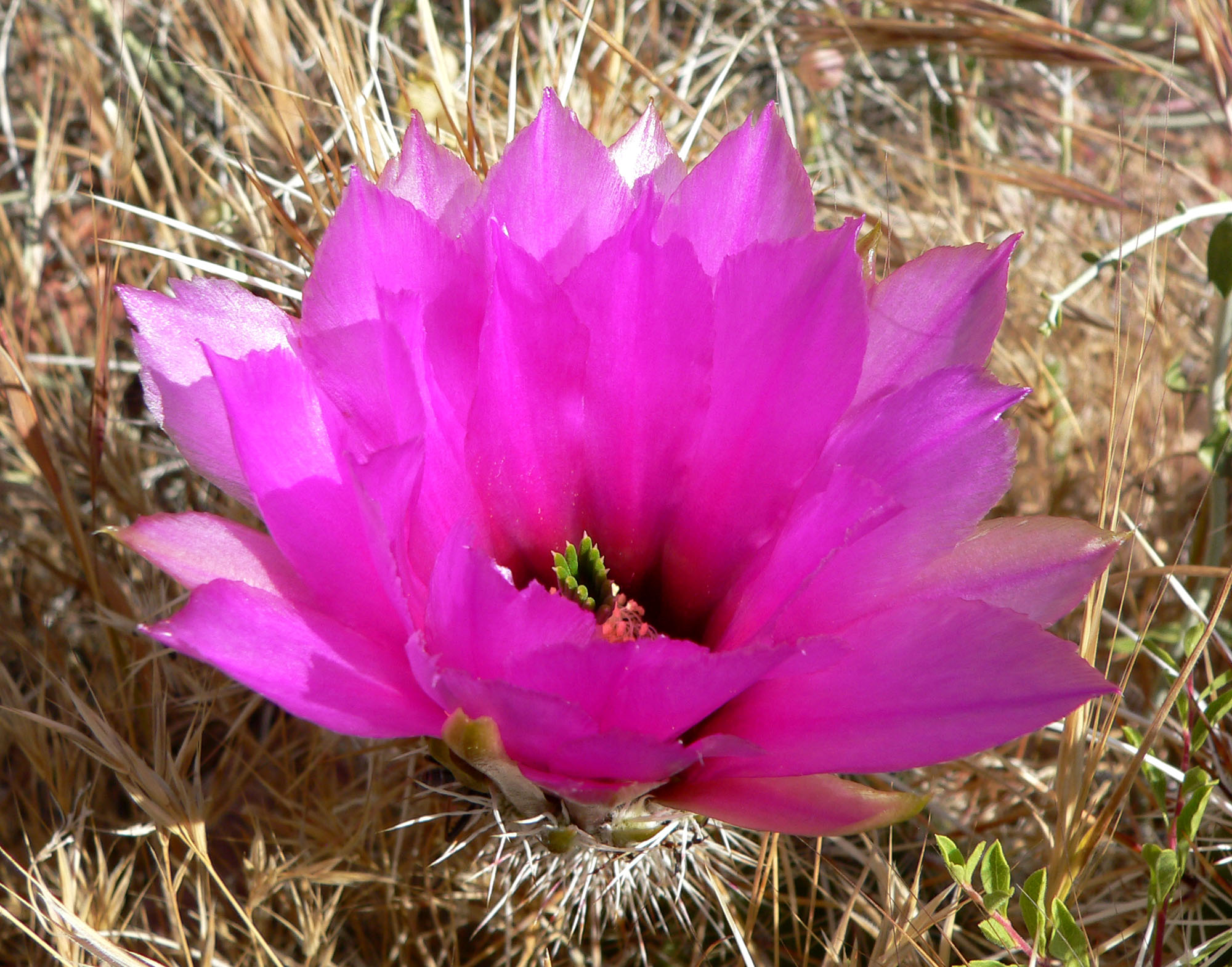
Detail of bloom, strawberry hedgehog

Echinocereus engelmannii, the strawberry hedgehog cactus or Engelmann's hedgehog cactus, is a cactus commonly found in desert areas of the southwestern United States and the adjacent areas of Mexico, including the states of California, Nevada, Utah, Arizona, Baja California and Sonora.

== Description ==
Engelmann's hedgehog cactus usually grows in clusters, sometimes up to 20 and more stems. The bright magenta flowers bloom in April in its southern extremes to late May at northern locations. Flowers are borne at the upper half to one third of the stem and are funnelform in shape, up to 3.5 in (8.9 cm) long with dark-green stigmas. The fruit is spiny. At first the fruit is green, becoming pink and drying when ripe. Ripe fruits have spines that are easily detached. Seeds are black and about a tenth of an inch in size. Stems are initially cylindrical and erect in young plants, but later with the stem base lying on the ground. The stems are usually 1.5 to 3.5 in (3.8 to 8.9 cm) in diameter and up to 25 in (64 cm) high, and obscured by heavy spines. The plants have around 10 ribs, which are somewhat flattened and tuberculate. Spines are variable in color and size. Radial spines are short and needlelike, up to 0.8 in (2.0 cm) long, white, and arranged in a neat rosette. Central spines number 2 to 7 and are stout, usually twisted and angular, up to 3 in (7.6 cm) long and variable in color: bright yellow, dark brown, grey, and white. Chromosome count is 2n=44.

== Subspecies ==
Accepted subspecies:

Image	Scientific name	Distribution
	Echinocereus engelmannii var. acicularis L.D.Benson	SE. California, W. & S. Arizona, Mexico (NE. Baja California, NW. Sonora)
	Echinocereus engelmannii var. armatus L.D.Benson	S. California to S. Nevada
	Echinocereus engelmannii var. chrysocentrus (Engelm. & J.M.Bigelow) Rümpler	S. & SE. California, S.& E. Nevada, W. & N. Arizona, W. Utah
	Echinocereus engelmannii subsp. engelmannii	SW. U.S.A. to Mexico (Baja California)
	Echinocereus engelmannii var. howei L.D.Benson	SE. California
	Echinocereus engelmannii subsp. magnursensis Berresf. & M.Terry	S. California
	Echinocereus engelmannii var. munzii (Parish) Pierce & Fosberg	S. California to Mexico (NE. Baja California)
	Echinocereus engelmannii var. purpureus L.D.Benson	SW. Utah
	Echinocereus engelmannii var. variegatus (Engelm. & J.M.Bigelow) Rümpler	SE. Utah to N. Arizona

== Distribution ==
Engelmann's hedgehog cactus is one of the most common species of cactus in the south-western US (southern California, Arizona, southern Nevada, Utah) and Mexico (Baja California down to northern Baja California Sur, Sonora) at elevations from sea level to 2400 meters. There are a number of varieties of Echinocereus engelmannii, and some are rare. It grows in different dry habitats normally in well drained deserts in the Sonoran and Mojave deserts, chaparral, pinyon-juniper woodlands, grass, and Great Basin shrub in flats with fine sand on the plain, washes and canyons in the desert, and also in gravelly, sandy, or rocky hillsides, and in mountain ranges. The rich flora and diverse vegetation of the area includes, among others, Ferocactus cylindraceus, Cochemiea grahamii, Cochemiea tetrancistra, Echinocereus scopulorum, Fouquieria sp., Larrea tridentata, Parkinsonia microphylla, Fouquieria columnaris, Cylindropuntia leptocaulis, Cylindropuntia ramosissima, and Opuntia engelmannii. Engelmann's hedgehog cactus is abundant throughout its range.

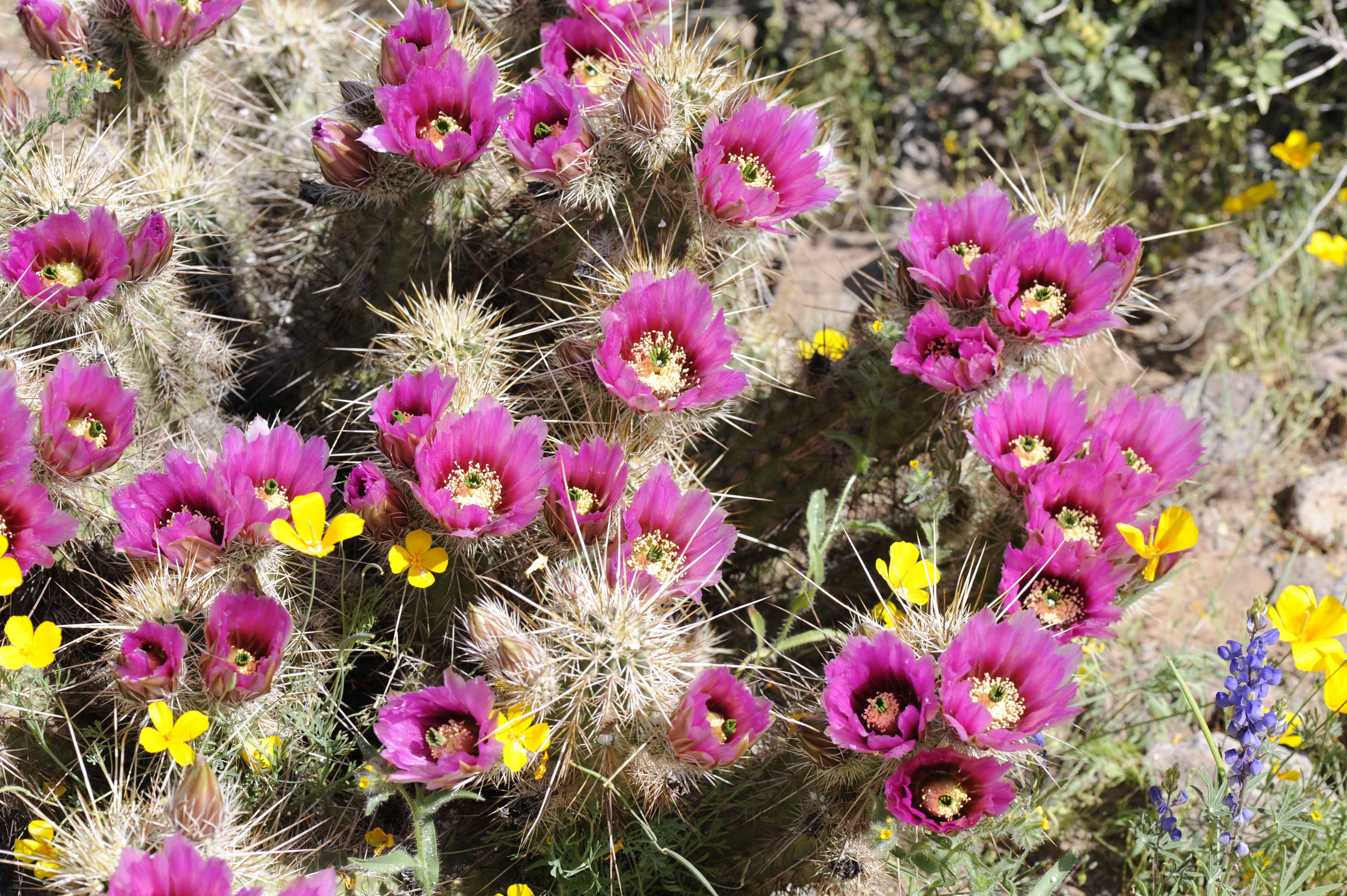
Plant blooming in habitat

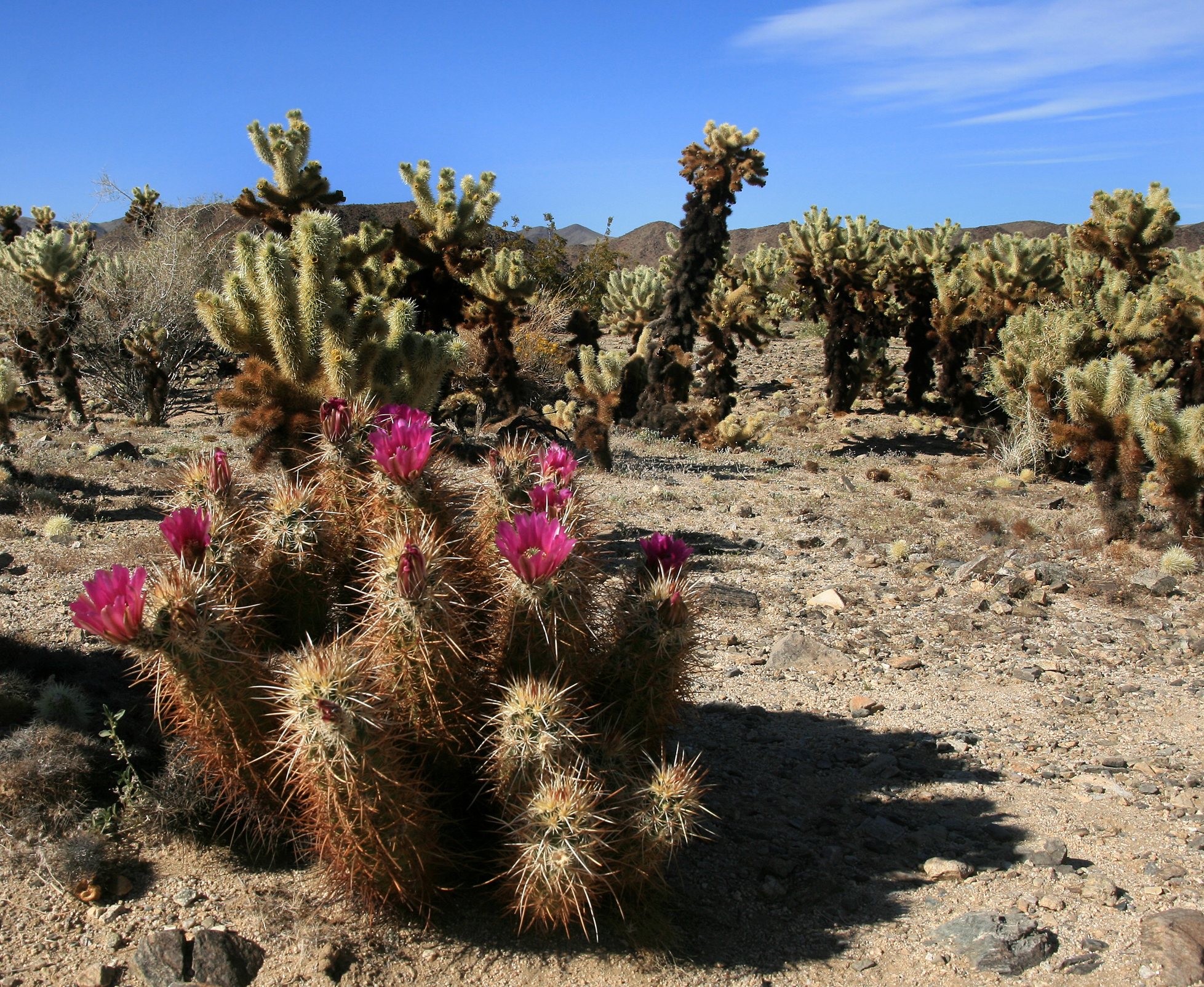
Plant growing in Joshua Tree National Park with Cylindropuntia bigelovii

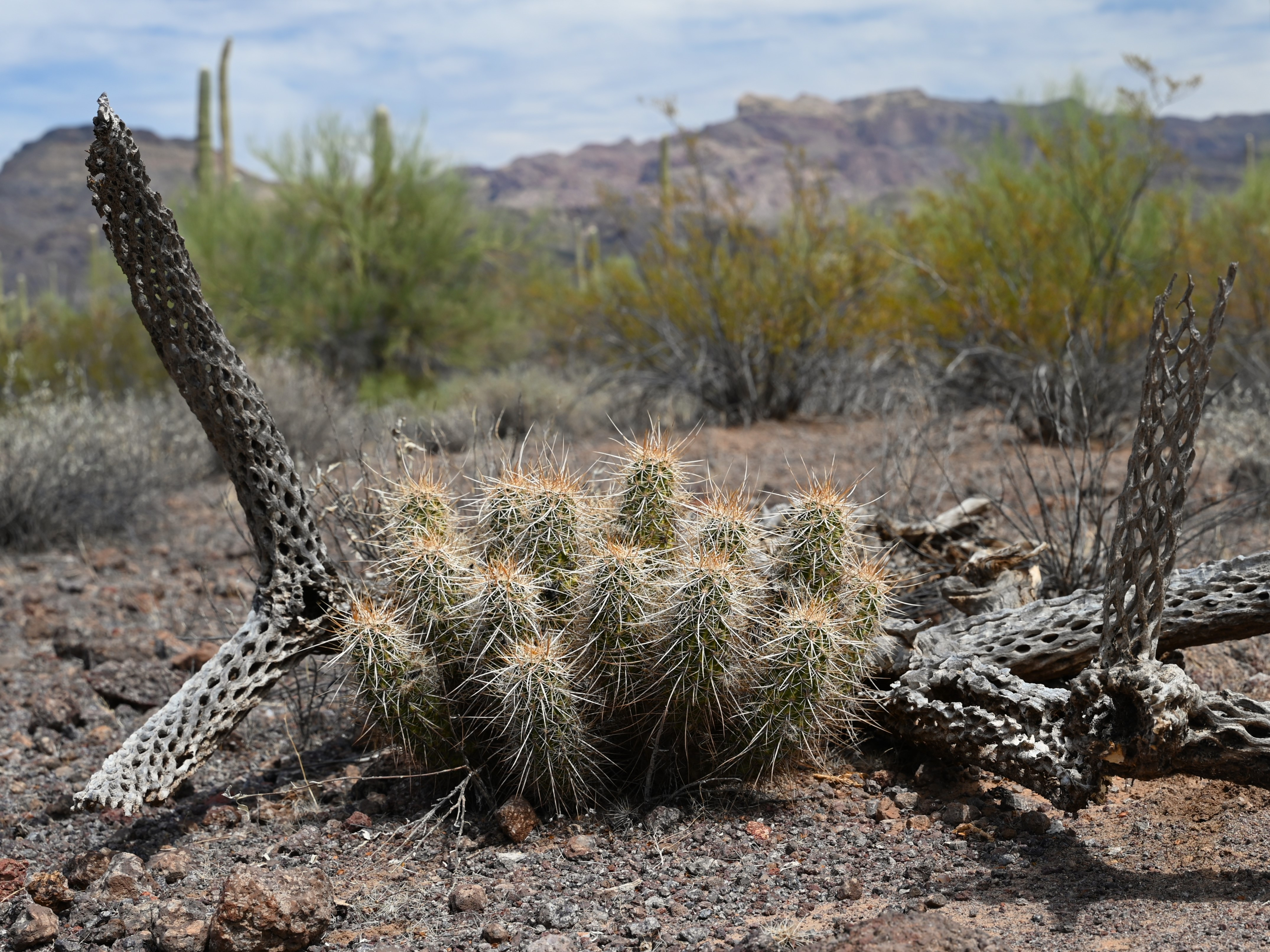
Echinocereus engelmannii surrounded by dead wood of Cylindropuntia fulgida in Tillotson Peak Wayside in Organ Pipe Cactus Wilderness, Arizona

== Taxonomy ==
This species was first described as Cereus engelmannii in 1852 by George Engelmann. Charles Lemaire moved this species in to the genus Echinocereus in 1868. This species is located within the genus Echinocereus and is taxonomically closest to E. bonkerae Thornber & Bonker, E. dasyacanthus Engelm., E. fasciculatus (Engelm. ex S. Watson) L. D. Benson, E. fendleri (Engelm.) Rümpler, E. nicholii (L. D. Benson) B. D. Parfitt, E. papillosus A. Linke ex Rümpler, and E. pectinatus (Scheidw.) Engelm.. These species share the common traits of thick base tepals (>2mm), wide receptacular tubes, and dark coloring of the flower throat. Some molecular evidence supports the division of E. engelmannii into two species to distinguish its diploid ancestor E. relictus B. Wellard., which is distributed only in a narrow section of southwestern Utah and northern Arizona.

== Uses ==
Echinocereus engelmannii is used as a landscape plant in its native areas. In pot culture, this species requires well aerated gritty substrate and a hot and sunny location in the summer. During winter, this species tolerates light frost and wet (if well-drained) soil. In cultivation, this species usually does not bloom until it develops 2–3 branches.
