= Alto Golfo de California Biosphere Reserve =

UNESCO biosphere reserve in Sonora, Mexico

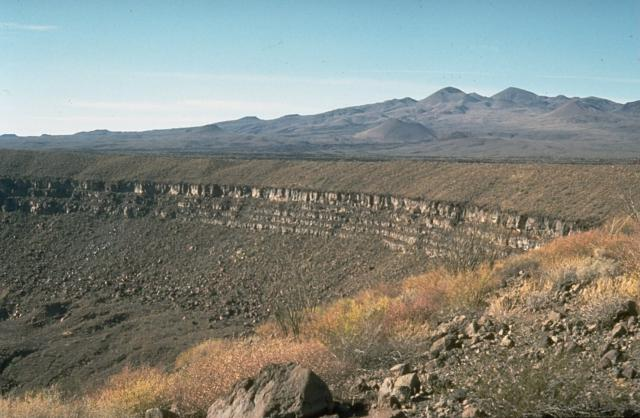
- Pinacate volcanic field

- Location within Mexico
- Location: Gulf of California, Mexico
- Nearest town: San Luis Río Colorado, Sonora Puerto Peñasco, Sonora Mexicali Baja California
- Coordinates: 31°36′36″N 113°51′36″W
- Area: 1,652,110 hectares (6,378.8 sq mi)
- Established: 1995

Alto Golfo de California Biosphere Reserve is a UNESCO Biosphere Reserve located in the state of Sonora in extreme northwestern Mexico. The 1,652,110 hectares (6,378.8 sq mi) reserve comprises the El Pinacate y Gran Desierto reserve and the Bahia Adair on the Gulf of California border. Geological volcanic formations with craters, dunes, oasis and beaches, and the diversity of plant associations determine its special landscape. The reserve was established in 1993 by the President of Mexico as Reserva de la Biosfera del Alto Golfo de California y Delta del Río Colorado (Upper Gulf of California and Colorado River Delta Biosphere Reserve) and extended in 1995.

In 1990, 129,516 inhabitants lived in the transition and buffer areas in ejidos or communal properties, primarily engaged in agriculture, forestry, mineral extractions and cattle raising located mainly in the coastal areas. In 2016, Mares Mexicanos estimated the population of the Alto Golfo area to be around 69,700, across 210 locations. One of the most important economic activities in the transition areas is the existence of international enterprises (maquiladoras), in San Luis Río Colorado, which engage 5,880 people living in the urban villages.

The reserve is managed by the Municipality of Mexicali in the State of Baja California and the Municipalities of Puerto Peñasco and San Luis Río Colorado in the State of Sonora.

== Environments ==
=== El Pinacate y Gran Desierto de Altar ===
El Pinacate y Gran Desierto de Altar Biosphere Reserve (Spanish: Reserva de la Biosfera El Pinacate y Gran Desierto de Altar), is a biosphere reserve and UNESCO World Heritage Site It is in the Sonoran Desert in the eastern part Gran Desierto de Altar, just south of the border with Arizona, United States and north of the city of Puerto Peñasco. A volcanic system, known as Santa Clara is the main part of the landscape, including three peaks; Pinacate, Carnegie and Medio.

The Pinacate Peaks (Picos del Pinacate), a group of volcanic peaks and cinder cones, are located in the Reserve north of Puerto Peñasco. The highest peak is Cerro del Pinacate (Santa Clara volcano), with an elevation of 3,904 feet (1,190 m). Pinacate comes from Náhuatl language word pinacatl, for the Pinacate beetle, a stink beetle endemic to the Sonoran Desert.

=== Bahia Adair ===
Bahia Adair or Adair Bay is a bay at the northern end of the Gulf of California. There are three different habitats: the wetlands, artesian wells, and the salt pans. Endangered animals live in the area, including one endemic species, the desert pupfish.

== Ecological characteristics ==
The variety of species in the zone ranges from marine through coastal to land species. Located in the coastal zone are flats, beaches and dune systems, granite sierras and the volcanic shield communities. The land fauna of the reserve is diverse, due to the varied mosaic of its vegetation, ranging from that associated with wetland areas to more inhospitable sites found in the sandy areas of the Great Desert. The Colorado River is the main habitat for the hogfish (Lachnolaimus maximus).

This location is one of the few places in North America where the fringe-toed lizard (Uma inornata) is distributed, in addition to being the western limit for the distribution of the Gila monster (Heloderma suspectum). Among the reptiles, the diamondback rattlesnake, the coral snake, the horned lizard and the desert tortoise are also found. Birdlife is well represented with at least 80 species of land and aquatic birds, both resident and migratory, characterizing the area with high diversity.

The land mammals are mainly representative of the Sonora and San Bernardina biotic provinces: white-tailed deer, mule deer (Odocoileus hemionus), Big Horn Sheep (Ovis canadensis cremnobates), the Pronghorn (Antilocapra americana), the javelina, and the long-nosed bat, among others. Species of vegetation include the saguaro cactus, the strawberry hedgehog cactus (Echinocereus engelmannii), the thorny bisnaga cactus, the Mexican palo verde (Parkinsonia aculeata), and the ironwood tree, among many others. The marine species include the porpoise or vaquita (Phocoena sinus), protected by Mexican law as an endangered species, the totoaba and the Yuma clapper rail.

== Sources ==
This article incorporates text from a free content work (license statement/permission). Text taken from UNESCO - MAB Biosphere Reserves Directory, UNESCO, UNESCO.
