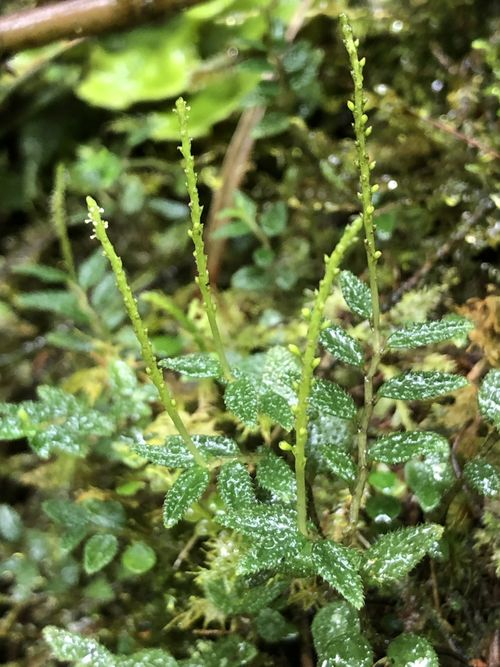

Scientific classification
- Kingdom: Plantae
- Clade: Tracheophytes
- Clade: Angiosperms
- Clade: Magnoliids
- Order: Piperales
- Family: Piperaceae
- Genus: Peperomia
- Species: P. tovariana

Binomial name
- Peperomia tovariana C.DC.

Synonyms
- Peperomia lateovata (Sw.) Trel.; Peperomia lateovata var. glabrata Trel.; Peperomia tenella var. deltoides Trel.

= Peperomia tovariana =

Species of flowering plant

Peperomia tovariana is a species of epiphyte or lithophyte in the genus Peperomia found in Central and South America. It primarily grows on wet tropical biomes. Its conservation status is Not Threatened.

== Description ==
The first specimens where collected in Venezuela.

Peperomia tovariana has petiolate oblong leaves. The base is subordinate, truncate or subreniform. The apex is obtuse. The catkins are ciliolate, membranaceous-pellucid, and laxiflorous. The ovary is emergent. The stigma is papillose. The bract is peltate and rounded in the center.

The stems are filiform and hairy. The limbs are 0.003-0.008 long and 0.004 wide. The petioles are 0.0015 long.

== Taxonomy and naming ==
It was described in 1869 by Casimir de Candolle in Prodromus Systematis Naturalis Regni Vegetabilis, from specimens collected by Augustus Fendler. It gets its name from the location where the specimens were first collected.

== Subtaxa ==
Following subtaxa are accepted.

- Peperomia tovariana var. subcaespitosa Trel. * Yunck,

== Distribution and habitat ==
It is found in Central and South America. It grows on epiphyte or lithophyte environment and is a herb. In Colombia, its elevation range is 1800-3500 meters. It was introduced in Haiti and Jamaica. It grows on wet tropical biomes.

== Conservation ==
This species is assessed as Not Threatened, in a preliminary report.
