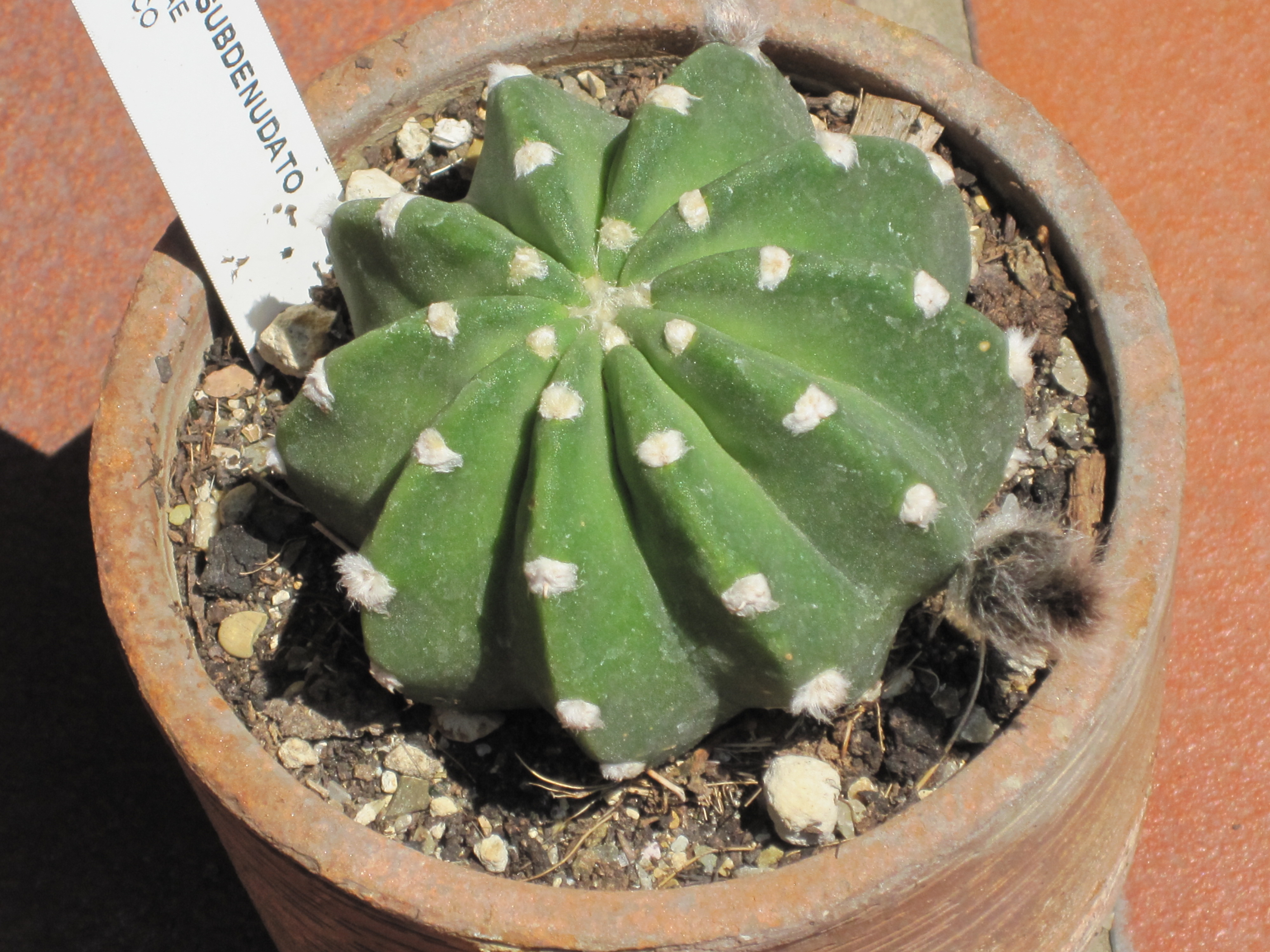

Conservation status
- Vulnerable (IUCN 3.1)

Scientific classification
- Kingdom: Plantae
- Clade: Tracheophytes
- Clade: Angiosperms
- Clade: Eudicots
- Order: Caryophyllales
- Family: Cactaceae
- Subfamily: Cactoideae
- Genus: Echinopsis
- Species: E. ancistrophora

Binomial name
- Echinopsis ancistrophora Speg.

Synonyms
- List: Echinopsis ancistrophora var. graulichii (Frič) J.Ullmann; Echinopsis ancistrophora var. hamatacantha (Backeb.) Rausch; Echinopsis ancistrophora var. polyancistra (Backeb.) Rausch; Echinopsis hamatacantha Backeb.; Echinopsis hamatacantha Backeb.; Echinopsis leucorhodantha Backeb.; Echinopsis lobivioides Backeb.; Echinopsis obrepanda subsp. tapecuana (F.Ritter) G.Navarro; Echinopsis pelecyrhachis Backeb.; Echinopsis pelecyrhachis var. lobivioides (Backeb.) Friedrich; Echinopsis polyancistra Backeb.; Echinopsis subdenudata Cárdenas; Echinopsis tapecuana F.Ritter; Lobivia ancistrophora (Speg.) Schlumpb.; Lobivia graulichii Frič; Lobivia subdenudata (Cárdenas) Schlumpb.; Mesechinopsis ancistrophora (Speg.) Y.Itô; Mesechinopsis hamatacantha (Backeb.) Y.Itô; Mesechinopsis leucorhodantha (Backeb.) Y.Itô; Mesechinopsis lobivioides (Backeb.) Y.Itô; Mesechinopsis nakajimae Y.Itô; Mesechinopsis pelecyrhachis (Backeb.) Y.Itô; Mesechinopsis polyancistra (Backeb.) Y.Itô; Pseudolobivia ancistrophora (Speg.) Backeb.; Pseudolobivia hamatacantha (Backeb.) Backeb.; Pseudolobivia leucorhodantha (Backeb.) Backeb. ex Krainz; Pseudolobivia lobivioides (Backeb.) Backeb. ex Krainz; Pseudolobivia pelecyrhachis (Backeb.) Backeb. ex Krainz; Pseudolobivia pelecyrhachis var. lobivioides (Backeb.) Backeb.; Pseudolobivia polyancistra (Backeb.) Backeb.

= Echinopsis ancistrophora =

Species of cactus

Echinopsis ancistrophora, synonyms including Lobivia ancistrophora, commonly called domino cactus, night blooming hedgehog, Easter lily cactus, is a species of cactus. It has a globular shape, few spines, with large, white flowers attached to long, green tubes. It occurs in Bolivia, at altitudes of 600–1800 metres, and northwest Argentina. It has gained the Royal Horticultural Society's Award of Garden Merit.

== Description ==
The grey-green, single plant body, slightly depressed at the top, is spherical and reaches heights of 5 to 8 centimeters with diameters of 7 to 12 centimeters. It has 10 to 12 straight, very sharp ribs on which there are small, cream-colored, elongated-elliptical areoles that are 1.5 centimeters apart. The spines are grayish brown and often hidden in the areole wool. The upright central spine is up to 2 millimeters long. The 3 to 7 thorns swollen at the base are up to 1.5 millimeters long.

The white to light pink, narrow funnel-shaped flowers, slightly curved above the ovary, are 17 to 20 centimeters long. They appear on the side near the top of the shoot and open at night. The pale green flower tube is up to 15 centimeters long and reaches a diameter of up to 7 centimeters. The elliptical ovary is 15 millimeters long and 8 to 10 millimeters wide. Its purple scales are pointed and have long white and black hairs. The 12 millimeter long style is white like the stamens.

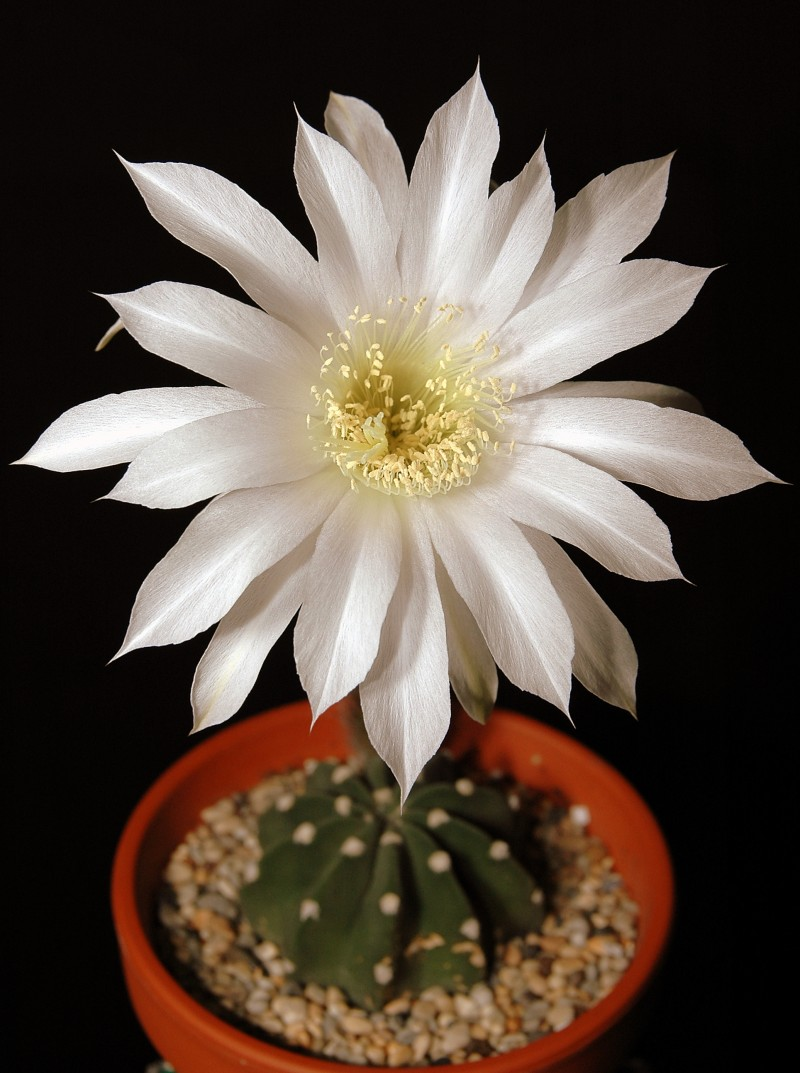
White flower

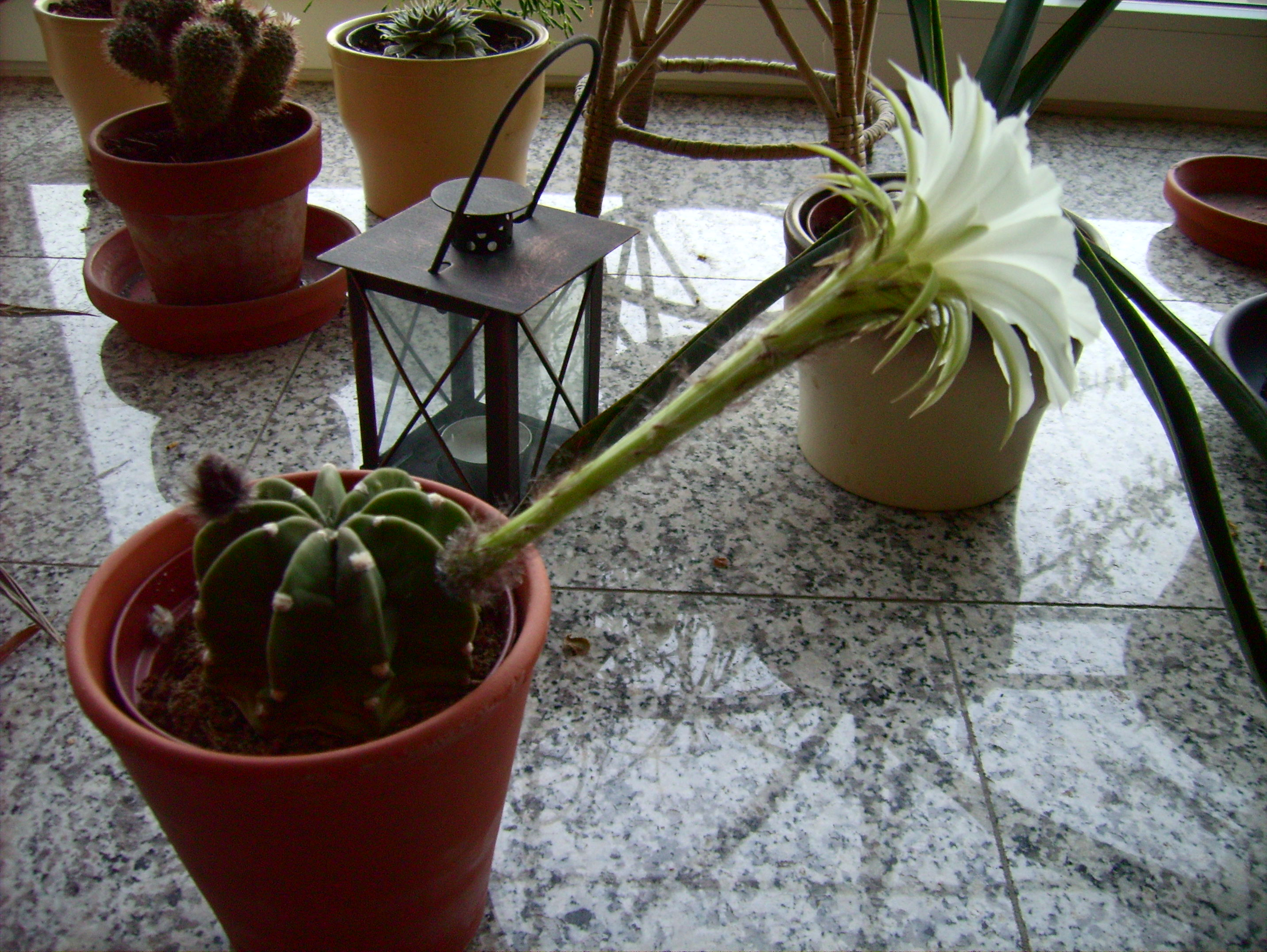
Long tube

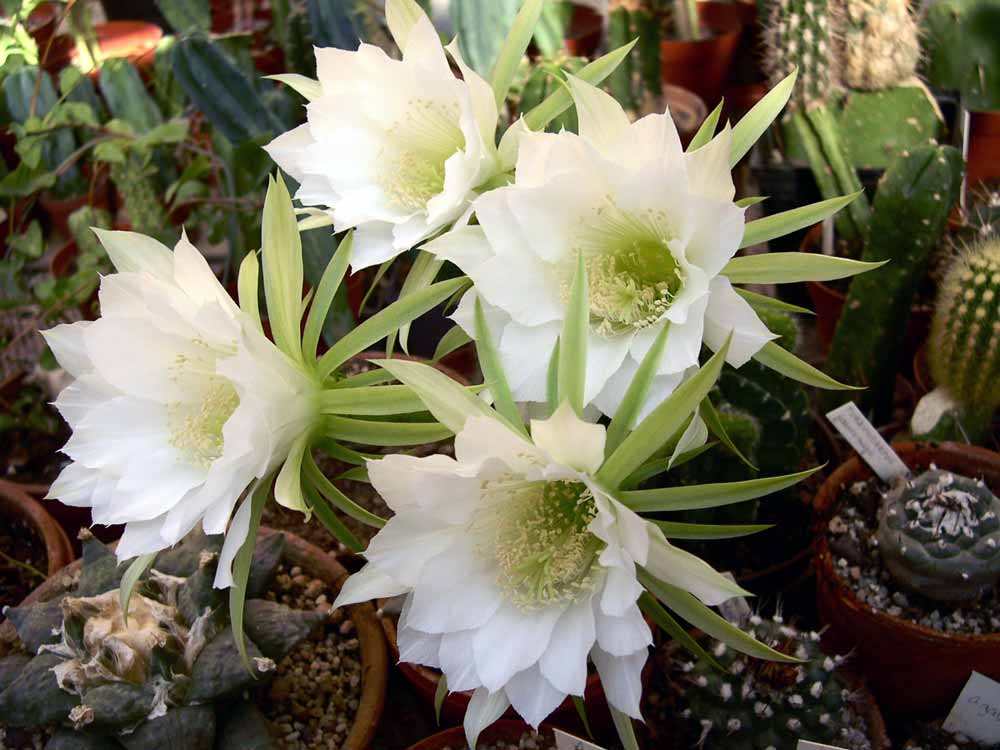
Multiple flowers

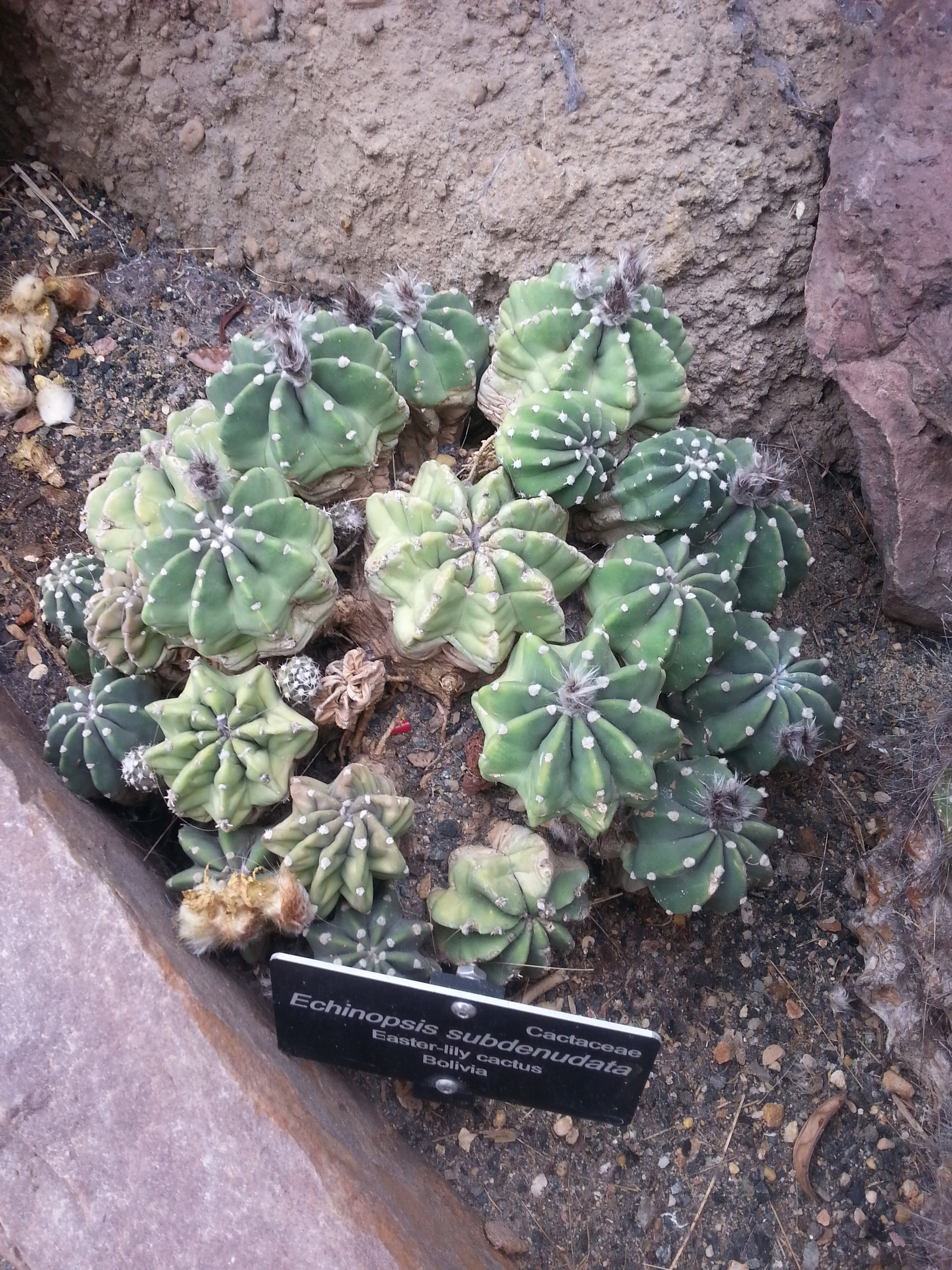
In botanical garden

== Distribution ==
Echinopsis ancistrophora is widespread near Angosto de Villamontes in the Entre Ríos Municipality in the Tarija Department in Bolivia at altitudes of 600 meters. It is also found in northwest Argentina.

== Taxonomy ==
Echinopsis ancistrophora was first described in 1905 by Carlo Luigi Spegazzini. Boris O. Schlumpberger transferred the species to the genus Lobivia in 2012, but it has since been restored to Echinopsis.

== See also ==
- Hedgehog cactus
- Night-blooming cereus
