= Pinkflower hedgehog cactus =

Pinkflower hedgehog cactus is a common name for several cacti and may refer to:

- Echinocereus bonkerae
- Echinocereus fasciculatus
- Echinocereus fendleri
