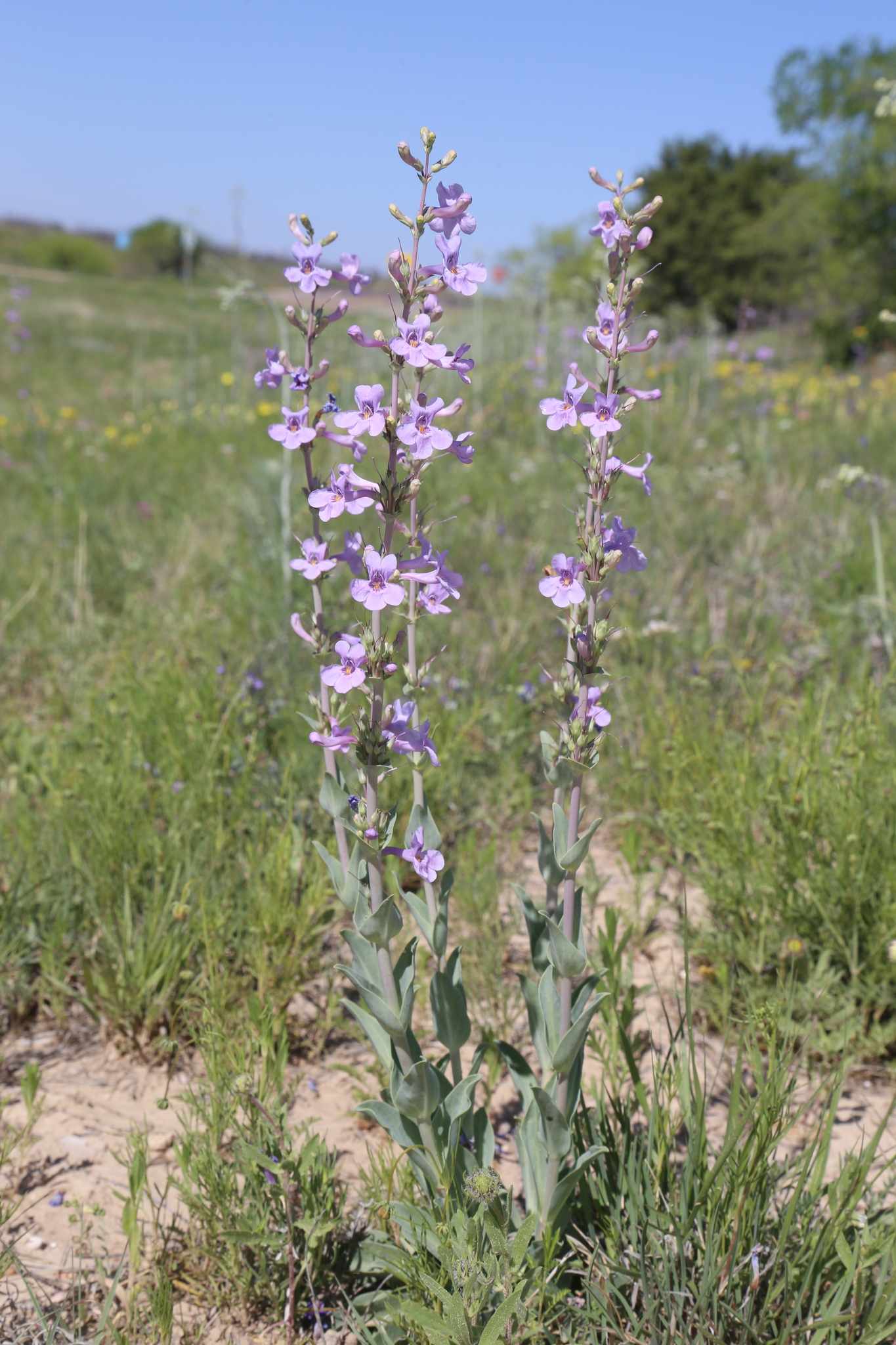
- Crosby County, Texas

Conservation status
- Secure (NatureServe)

Scientific classification
- Kingdom: Plantae
- Clade: Tracheophytes
- Clade: Angiosperms
- Clade: Eudicots
- Clade: Asterids
- Order: Lamiales
- Family: Plantaginaceae
- Genus: Penstemon
- Species: P. fendleri

Binomial name
- Penstemon fendleri Torr. & A.Gray

= Penstemon fendleri =

Plant species in the veronica family

Penstemon fendleri, also known as plains penstemon or Fendler's penstemon, is a moderate sized flowering plant from the southwestern US and small part of northern Mexico.

== Description ==
Plains penstemon grows one or more flowering stems, which can grow 15 to 60 centimeters (6–24 in) tall, but are most often 20 to 55 cm (8–22 in). The stems are thick and hairless.

The species has both basal leaves and cauline, those attached to the stems, all of them hairless. The lower leaves on the stems and the basal ones measure 2–10 cm (1–4 in) long and 0.4–2.4 cm wide. They are spatulate to oblanceolate, shaped like a spoon or a reversed spear head, with tapered bases.

Plains penstemon has narrow, tubular flowers that are blue-violet and curve slightly. The flowers are hairless on the outside and violet to reddish-purple floral guides pointing into the flower and sometimes have sparse white hairs on the lower surface. The lower three lobes spread quite widely. The flowers are in three to twelve groups, each quite distinctly separated. Each group has two branching points of attachment, usually with two or three flowers, but occasionally as many as five. Flowering is usually in March or June, but occasionally as late as July.

== Taxonomy ==
Penstemon fendleri was scientifically described and named in 1857 by John Torrey and Asa Gray. It is classified in the genus Penstemon within the Plantaginaceae family. It has no subspecies or botanical synonyms.

=== Names ===
The species name, fendleri, references the German botanist Augustus Fendler as does the common name Fendler's penstemon. The species is also called Fendler's beardtongue and plains penstemon.

== Range and habitat ==
Plains penstemon is native to the southernmost Great Plains, parts of the southern Southwestern United States and northern Mexico. According to the Natural Resources Conservation Service it has been found in Archuleta County, Colorado, but neither the Flora of North America nor Plants of the World Online list it as part of the flora of Colorado. It has also been collected in Kearny and Seward counties in Kansas, but has possibly become locally extinct. It has been found in western Oklahoma and Texas, but in most parts of New Mexico. It is only grows in the southwest of Arizona in Greenlee and Cochise counties. In Mexico is grows in just northern Chihuahua and in Coahuila.

== See also ==
- List of Penstemon species
