= Hedgehog cactus =

Hedgehog cactus may refer to:

- Pediocactus, a genus of cacti containing 6-11 species
- Echinocereus, a genus of ribbed, usually small to medium-sized cylindrical cacti, comprising about 70 species from the southern United States and Mexico in very sunny rocky places
- Echinopsis, a large genus of cacti native to South America containing 128 species

== See also ==
- Pinkflower hedgehog cactus
- Strawberry hedgehog cactus
