= San Luis Río Colorado Municipality =

Coordinates: 32°28′N 114°47′W

San Luis Río Colorado
- Municipality
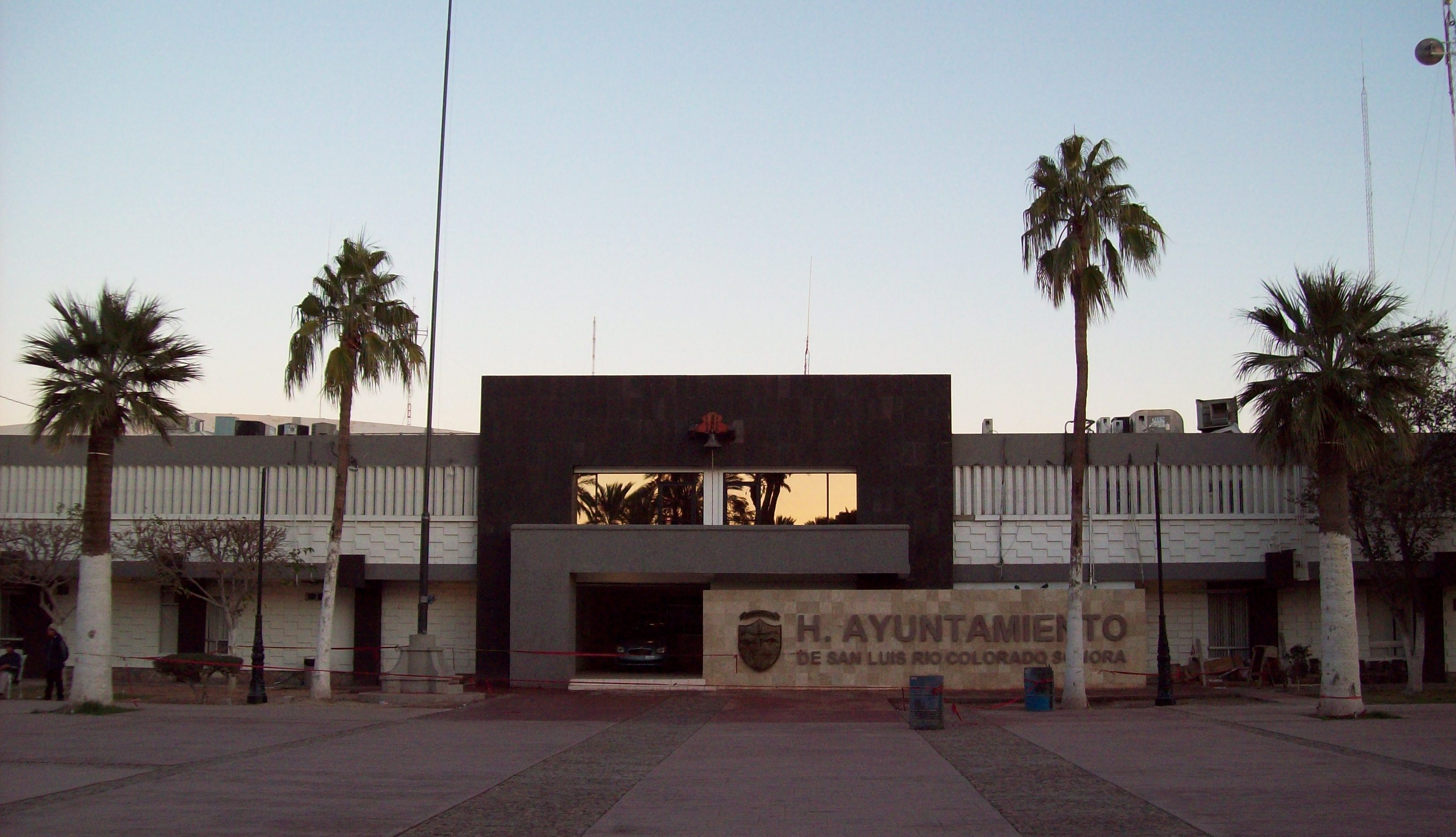
- Town hall

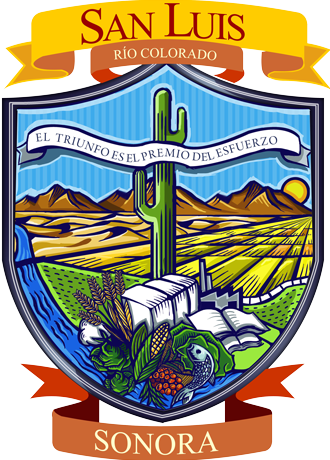
- Coat of arms

- Location of the municipality in Sonora
- Country: Mexico
- State: Sonora
- Seat: San Luis Río Colorado

Population (2020)
  - Total: 199,021
- Time zone: UTC–07:00 (Zona Pacífico)
- Area code: +52 653

San Luis Río Colorado is a municipality in the state of Sonora in northwestern Mexico, being the northwesternmost municipality in Sonora and covering an area of 8412.75 km^{2}.

The municipality is the location of the city of San Luis Rio Colorado (its municipal seat), the community of El Golfo de Santa Clara, and the Bahia Adair biosphere preserve.

== Geography ==
The municipality is in the Lower Colorado River Valley, with the Colorado River along its west, the U.S.-Mexico border along the north, and to the Colorado River Delta on the southwest, and the Gulf of California (Sea of Cortez) along the south.

=== Adjacent jurisdictions ===
- Yuma County, Arizona — north
- Municipality of Puerto Peñasco, Sonora — east
- Municipality of Mexicali and Colorado River, Baja California — west
- Gulf of California (Sea of Cortes) — south

=== Populated places ===
The largest cities, towns, and villages within the municipality include:

Name	2020 Census Population
San Luis Río Colorado	176,685
Ingeniero Luis B. Sánchez	5,970
Golfo de Santa Clara	4,618
Islita	2,332
Estación Riíto	1,413
Lagunitas	1,217
Total Municipality	199,021

=== Former settlements ===
Former historical settlements sites within the current municipality, many along the Colorado River that served shipping by steamboats on the Colorado River, include:

Name	founded	abandoned	Notes
Colonia Lerdo	1870s	1900s	Agricultural settlement
Gridiron	1854	1879	Colorado River steamboat landing
Hualapai Smith's	1860s	1879	Colorado River steamboat landing
Lerdo Landing	1870s	1900s	Colorado River landing for Colonia Lerdo
Ogden's Landing	1854	1879	Colorado River steamboat landing
Port Famine	1854	1879	Colorado River steamboat landing
Port Isabel	1864	1879	Colorado River steamboat landing and Pacific Ocean seaport

== History ==
The first vaccines against the COVID-19 pandemic in Mexico arrived for medical personal on January 13, 2021.

Eleven people were arrested for possession of weapons reserved for the military on March 13, 2021.

== Government ==
=== Municipal presidents ===
Municipal president	Term	Political party	Notes
Félix M. Contreras	1939–1941	PRM	
Carlos Encinas	1941–1943	PRM	
Alberto Veytia Ponce	1943–1946	PRM	
Heriberto R. Silva	1946–1949	PRI	
Refugio del Río Sáenz	1949–1952	PRI	
Isidro Parra Olguín	1952–1955	PRI	
Eulogio Medina Hoyos	1955–1958	PRI	
Mario Morúa Johnson	1958–1961	PRI	
Carlos Rodríguez Araiza	1961	PRI	Acting municipal president
Manuel Parra Peralta	1961–1964	PRI	
Carlos Rodríguez Araiza	1964–1967	PRI	
Rafael Loya Castro	1967–1970	PRI	
Jorge Flores Valdez	1970–1973	PRI	
Rubén Payán Serrano	1973–1976	PRI	
Ignacio Guzmán Gómez	1976–1979	PRI	
Rodolfo Rogel Villa	1979–1982	PRI	
Fausto Ochoa Medina	1982–1985	PAN	
Sergio Miguel García Íñiguez	1985–1988	PRI	
José Jesús Bustamante Salcido	1988–1991	PRI	
Gilberto Madrid Navarro	1991–1994	PRI	
Jorge Figueroa González	1994–1997	PAN	
Florencio Díaz Armenta	1997–2000	PAN	
José Enrique Reina Lizárraga	2000–2003	PAN	
José Inés Palafox Núñez	2003–2006	PAN	
Héctor Rubén Espino Santana	2006–2009	PAN	
Manuel de Jesús Baldenebro Arredondo	2009–2012	PRI	
Leonardo Guillén Medina	2012–2015	PAN	
José Enrique Reina Lizárraga	2015–2018	PAN	
Santos González Yescas	2018–2021	PT; Morena; PES	Coalition "Together We Will Make History"
Santos González Yescas	2021–2024	Morena	Was reelected on 06/06/2021
César Iván Sandoval Gámez	2024–	Morena; PVEM; PT; PNA Sonora; PES Sonora	

== See also ==
- Communities in the Lower Colorado River Valley
- Alto Golfo de California Biosphere Reserve
- Steamboat transport on the Colorado River
