= Colonia Lerdo =

Ghost town in Sonora, Mexico

Coordinates: 32°04′00″N 114°57′00″W

Colonia Lerdo, a ghost town located in San Luis Río Colorado Municipality, Sonora, Mexico, was founded as an agricultural colony in 1872 by entrepreneur Thomas H. Blythe and Mexican Gen. Guillermo Andrade. Lerdo Landing was located 80 miles up the Colorado River from its mouth, and Lerdo was located just east of the river landing on a mesa. Lerdo was described as having streets lined with Eucalyptus trees. The colony was intended to grow and harvest the wild hemp that grew over much of the Colorado River Delta. They also experimented with growing cotton and raised corn and other vegetables for their own use.

Colonia Lerdo at first populated by 73 persons eventually grew to more than 500 people. After 1896 they migrated to the border abandoning the town. This town belonged to the municipality of Caborca, Sonora.
