= Bahia Adair =

Bay in Sonora, Mexico

Coordinates: 31°30′0″N 113°48′0″W

Designations

Ramsar Wetland
- Official name: Humedales de Bahía Adair
- Designated: 2 February 2009
- Reference no.: 1866

Bahia Adair or Adair Bay is a bay at the northern end of the Gulf of California in the municipality of San Luis Río Colorado in the state of Sonora in Mexico. It is 40 kilometers from east to west and 15 kilometres from north to south. It contains basins with sizable deposits of salts. The shore area consists of 42,430 hectares (104,800 acres) of wetlands which were designated a conservation zone under the Ramsar Convention in 2009. There are three different habitats: the wetlands, artesian wells, and the salt pans. Endangered animals live in the area, including one endemic species, the desert pupfish. Portions of the area have been zoned for natural resource extraction. Bahia Adair is part of the Alto Golfo de California Biosphere Reserve is a UNESCO Biosphere Reserve (1995).

It was named by British explorer Robert William Hale Hardy and noted in his Travels in the Interior of Mexico in 1825 – 1828 originally published in London in 1829. Hardy thought it marked the entrance to the Colorado River.
