= Lerdo Landing =

Ghost town in Baja California, Mexico

Lerdo Landing is a ghost town in Baja California. It was originally located in Sonora, Mexico from 1872 to 1896. Later changes to the course of the Colorado River and political boundaries left the site located in Baja California.

== History ==
Lerdo Landing was a steamboat landing for the settlement of Colonia Lerdo that was established on the east side of the Colorado River. It was originally served by steamboats of George Alonzo Johnson's Colorado Steam Navigation Company until the Southern Pacific Railroad reached Yuma, Arizona, in 1877 and bought out the steamboat company. The railroad company shut down its steamboat operations at Port Isabel, Sonora and ceased traffic on the river below Yuma. The promoters of Colonia Lerdo attempted to establish its own steamboat service, buying and operating the seagoing side-wheel steamship General Zaragosa and for the river the small propeller-driven steam launch the General Rosales. After the failure of that effort, wagons from Yuma and small sailing craft supplied transportation to the settlement until it was abandoned in the 1896.
