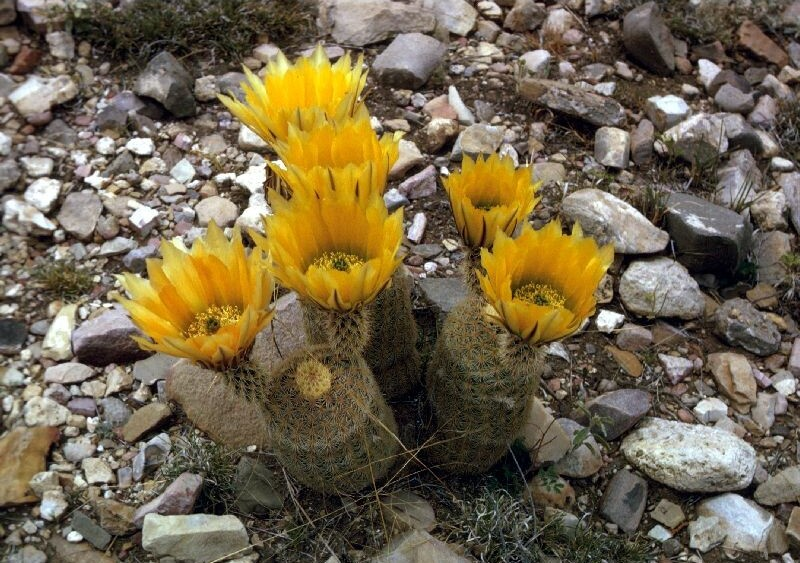

Conservation status
- Least Concern (IUCN 3.1)

Scientific classification
- Kingdom: Plantae
- Clade: Tracheophytes
- Clade: Angiosperms
- Clade: Eudicots
- Order: Caryophyllales
- Family: Cactaceae
- Subfamily: Cactoideae
- Genus: Echinocereus
- Species: E. dasyacanthus

Binomial name
- Echinocereus dasyacanthus Engelm.

= Echinocereus dasyacanthus =

Species of cactus

Echinocereus dasyacanthus is a member of the cactus family, Cactaceae. It is one of about 2000 total species belonging to this family. The cactus is commonly known as Texas rainbow cactus because of the subtle rings or bands of contrasting colors along the stem of the plant. Not all Texas rainbow cacti have the "rainbow" coloration on their stems. Another common name is spiny hedgehog cactus.

E. dasyacanthus can be identified as a tetraploid with predominantly yellow flowers. Experiments suggest this is due to the hybridization of E. dasyacanthus and E. coccineus. The E. dasyacanthus received its specific epithet from the two Greek words dasys and akantha, which mean "shaggy" and "thorns" respectively.

== Description ==
Echinocereus dasyacanthus plants are usually found with a single stem or 2–3 basal branches. Though it is not uncommon to find plants with 3–10 stems. The stems of Texas rainbow cactus are between 11 and 24 cm long and 5.5–7 cm wide and usually have 15–18 ribs. The spines usually overlap making the stem not visible. There is a great amount of variation in the spines characteristics. There are typically 4–12 central spines that are .5–1.2 cm long and 14–25 radial spines that are .7–2 cm long. The basic coloration of the spines are tan to yellow to pink. Some spines may be ashy-white to reddish brown, but that is less common.

=== Flowers ===
The flowering season for E. dasyacanthus is between the months of March and May. The large flower of the plant grow at the sides of the stem above the areoles close to the stem apex. The flowers are typically 8–12 cm long and 7–11 cm wide. The flowers smell sweet and are pollinated by bees. In the Trans-Pecos region of Texas the flowers are usually bright yellow with a green throat. Other color the flowers may be include dark to pale yellow, canary yellow, golden yellow or deep red to rose pink. Since this taxon of cacti are mostly yellow flowered, flowers that are beta cyanic and orange are less common. The tepals are relatively thick and durable compared to E. reichenbachii, but thin and soft compared to E. coccineus. The stamens of the flowers have filaments resulting in the floral throat being filled with a funnel of yellow anthers.

=== Fruits ===
The fruits of E. dasyacanthus are usually green or greenish purple at first. As they mature the fruits become a darker purple. The pulp is very juicy and can be white to purplish-pink in color. The fruit are globose to ellipsoid and relatively large measuring at 6 cm long and 4.5 cm wide. The spines on the fruit are deciduous.

== Taxonomy ==
George Engelmann first described the species in 1848. The specific epithet "dasyacanthus" comes from the Greek words “δασύς” (dasys), meaning “dense,” “rough,” or “shaggy,” and “άκανθα” (akantha), meaning “thorn.”

=== Subspecies ===
Accepted subspecies:

Image	Subspecies	Distribution
	Echinocereus dasyacanthus subsp. crockettianus D.Felix & H.Bauer	Texas
	Echinocereus dasyacanthus subsp. ctenoides (Engelm.) Lodé	S. Texas to Mexico (Chihuahua, Coahuila)
	Echinocereus dasyacanthus subsp. dasyacanthus	S. Central U.S.A. and Mexico (N. Sonora to N. Chihuahua)
	Echinocereus dasyacanthus subsp. multispinosus D.Felix & H.Bauer	Mexico (Chihuahua)

== Distribution ==
Echinocereus dasyacanthus can be found on rocky slopes of arid mountains, desert floor, in desert grasslands and more mesic habitats. They are distributed throughout New Mexico and Texas. It occurs in every county of Texas's Trans-Pecos region except for Val Verde. Texas rainbow cactus can also be spotted as far south as Chihuahua, and Coahuila, Mexico.

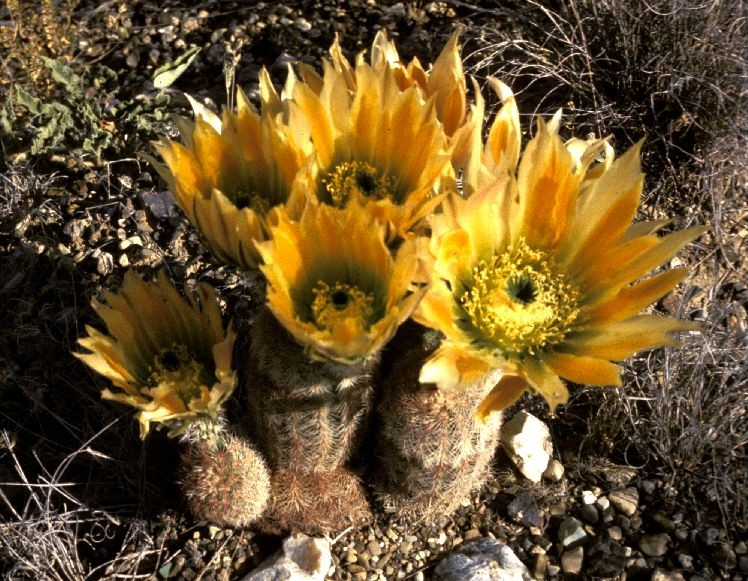
Flower of E. dasyacanthus or Texas Rainbow Cactus

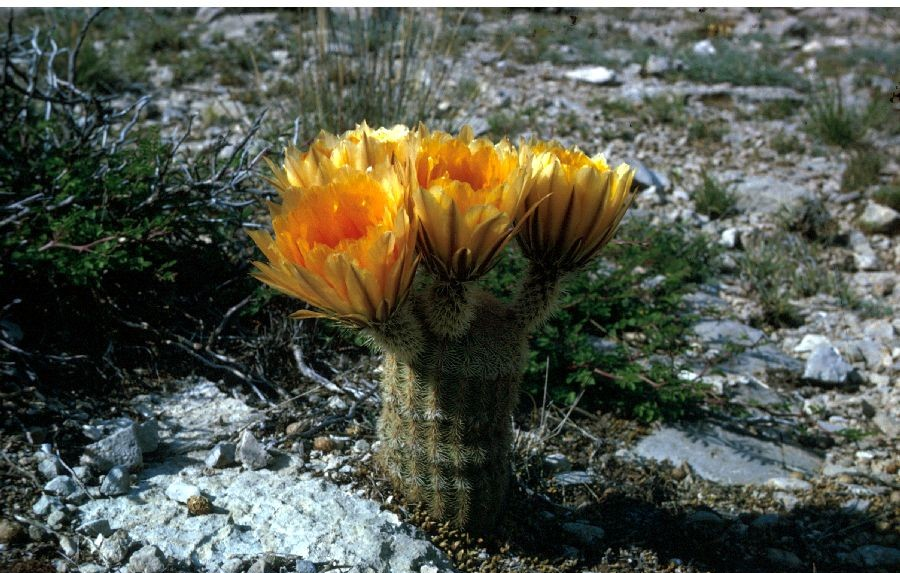
Texas Rainbow Cactus

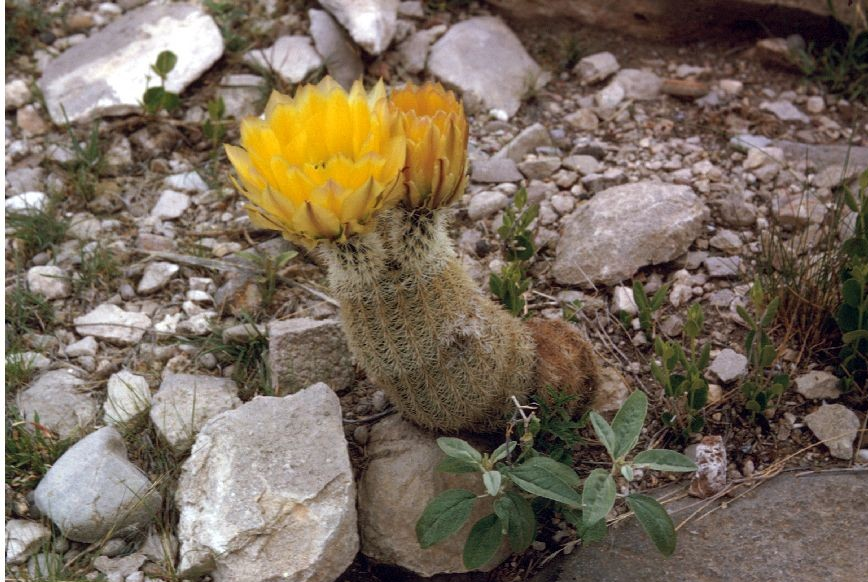
Texas Rainbow Cactus

== Cultivation ==
Echinocereus dasyacanthus is cultivated as an ornamental plant, for use in desert native plant natural landscaping, or as a house plant and in a greenhouse. As the Texas Rainbow cactus is a smaller cacti species, it can be easier to care for.

Growing conditions

Texas rainbow cactus requires little to no maintenance for growing. It requires little water and a lot of sunlight to partial shade. It can grow in soil or rocky sandy substrate. Seeds of Texas rainbow cactus will germinate between 5–180 days.
