= Diamondback rattlesnake =

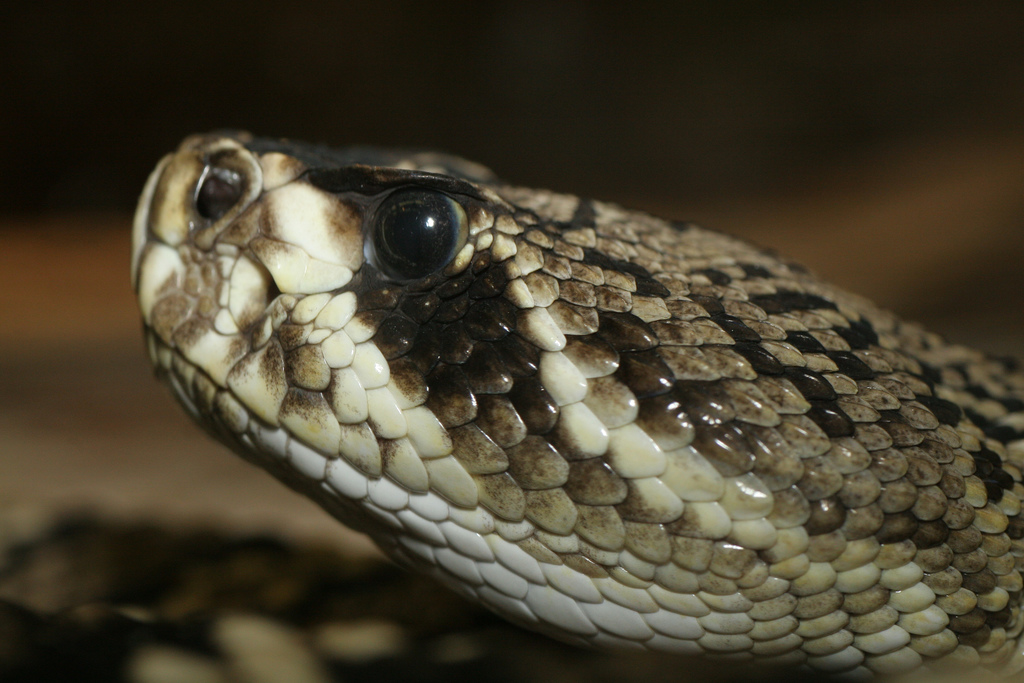
Eastern Diamondback Rattlesnake (Crotalus adamanteus)

Diamondback rattlesnake may refer to:

- Crotalus adamanteus, a.k.a. the eastern diamondback rattlesnake, a venomous pitviper species found in the southeastern United States.
- Crotalus atrox, a.k.a. the western diamondback rattlesnake, a venomous pit viper species found in the southwestern United States and Mexico.
- Crotalus oreganus, a.k.a. the western rattlesnake, a venomous pitviper species found in North America in the western United States, parts of British Columbia and northwestern Mexico.
- Crotalus ruber, a.k.a. the red diamond rattlesnake, a venomous pitviper species found in southwestern California in the United States and Baja California in Mexico.
