= Strawberry hedgehog cactus =

Strawberry hedgehog cactus is a common name for several cacti and may refer to:

- Echinocereus engelmannii, native to the southwestern United States and Mexico
- Echinocereus stramineus
