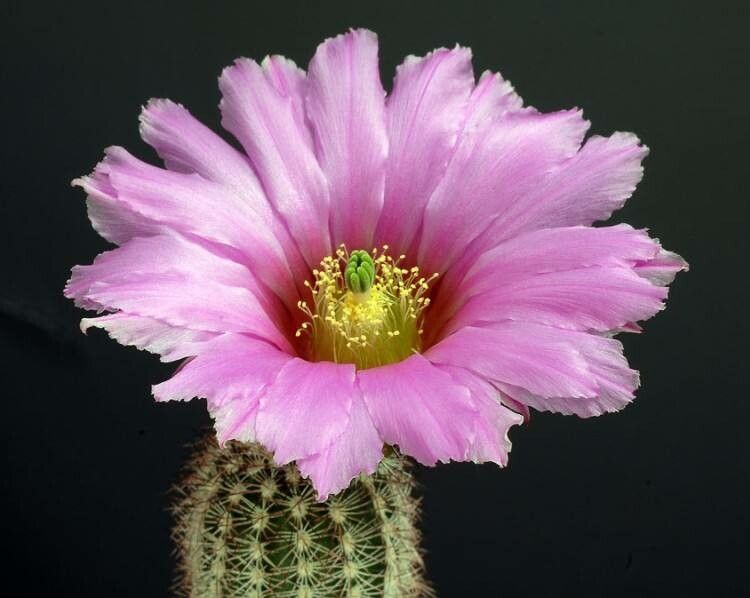

Conservation status
- Least Concern (IUCN 3.1)

Scientific classification
- Kingdom: Plantae
- Clade: Tracheophytes
- Clade: Angiosperms
- Clade: Eudicots
- Order: Caryophyllales
- Family: Cactaceae
- Subfamily: Cactoideae
- Genus: Echinocereus
- Species: E. scopulorum

Binomial name
- Echinocereus scopulorum Britton & Rose 1922

= Echinocereus scopulorum =

Species of cactus

Echinocereus scopulorum is a species of cactus native to Mexico.

== Description ==
Echinocereus scopulorum grows as a solitary cactus with cylindrical shoots ranging from 10 to 40 cm (3.9 to 15.7 in) long and up to 10 cm (3.9 in) in diameter, concealed by spines. It has 13 to 15 ribs, with three to ten central spines shorter than the approximately 20 peripheral spines, which are whitish with darker tips and 0.4 to 1.4 cm (0.16 to 0.55 in) long.

The fragrant, funnel-shaped flowers are light pink to magenta with a white throat, appearing near the tips of the shoots. They are 7 to 8.5 cm (2.8 to 3.3 in) centimeters long and up to 10 cm (3.9 in) in diameter. The spherical to egg-shaped fruits are dark green with white pulp, dry when ripe, but do not crack open.

== Distribution ==
Echinocereus scopulorum is found along the coastal xeric scrublands of the Mexican state of Sonora, on Isla Tiburón, and in the states of Sinaloa and Nayarit. It lives in the Sonoran desert, on rocky soils at elevations of 5 to 800 m (16 to 2,625 ft).

== Taxonomy ==
First described by Nathaniel Lord Britton and Joseph Nelson Rose in 1922 in The Cactaceae, the species name scopulorum, meaning 'mountain peak', 'cliff', or 'rock' in Latin, refers to its preferred habitat.
