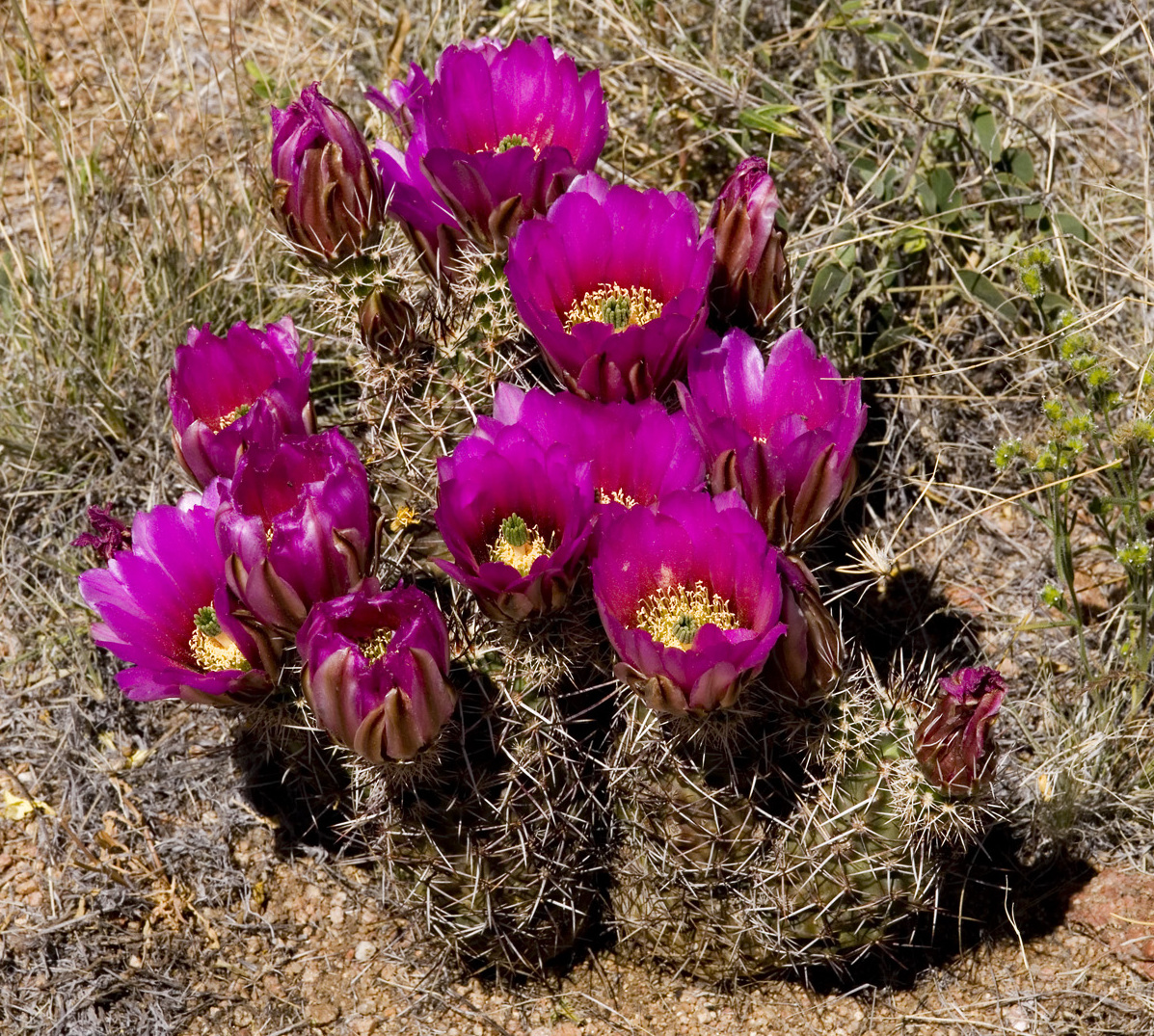

Conservation status
- Least Concern (IUCN 3.1)

- Apparently Secure (NatureServe)

Scientific classification
- Kingdom: Plantae
- Clade: Embryophytes
- Clade: Tracheophytes
- Clade: Angiosperms
- Clade: Eudicots
- Order: Caryophyllales
- Family: Cactaceae
- Subfamily: Cactoideae
- Genus: Echinocereus
- Species: E. fendleri

Binomial name
- Echinocereus fendleri (Engelm.) Sencke ex J.N.Haage

Synonyms
- Cereus fendleri Engelm. 1849

= Echinocereus fendleri =

Species of cactus

Echinocereus fendleri is a species of cactus known by the common names pinkflower hedgehog cactus and Fendler's hedgehog cactus. It is named in honor of Augustus Fendler.

It grows in deserts and woodlands in the Southwestern United States and Northeastern Mexico. It is most common in New Mexico.

The taxonomy of the species is uncertain, with authors recognizing up to eight varieties.

== Description ==
Echinocereus fendleri grows solitary with an erect oval or cylindrical stem, sometimes forming a clump of several spreading stem branches. The stem may reach 7.5 to 30 cm (3.0 to 11.8 in) in maximum height and 3.8 to 6.2 cm (1.5 to 2.4 in) in diameter. They have eight to ten non-tuberculated ribs. There are up to 16 spines per areole, generally in shades of brown and white, or white with a brown stripe. The single dark central spine, which may be absent, is straight or slightly curved and lightens with age, measuring 1.2 to 3.8 cm (0.47 to 1.50 in) long. The five to nine light-colored, spreading, straight marginal spines are 0.9 to 1.2 cm (0.35 to 0.47 in) long.

The showy flower is most any shade of pink, from nearly white to deep maroon. It can be 11 cm (4.3 in) long and wide, each tepal measuring up to 7 cm (2.8 in) long. The fruit is spherical, red and a few centimeters long.

The flesh of the plant is edible, and Native American groups consumed the stems and fruits.

=== Subspecies ===
There are two recognized subspecies:

Image	Scientific name	Distribution
	Echinocereus fendleri subsp. fendleri	Arizona to W. Texas and Mexico (Sonora, N. Chihuahua)
	Echinocereus fendleri subsp. rectispinus (Peebles) N.P.Taylor	SE. Arizona to W. Texas, Mexico (N. Sonora, Coahuila)

Echinocereus fendleri subsp. fendleri, Kuenzler's hedgehog cactus (formerly Echinocereus kuenzleri), is rare and federally listed as an endangered species of the United States. When it was listed in 1979, there were only 200 known individuals of this variety remaining, all in the Sacramento Mountains of New Mexico. It was threatened with extinction by poachers, who removed many plants from the wild.

More populations have since been discovered. The US Fish and Wildlife Service has suggested it be downlisted to threatened status. Kuenzler's hedgehog cactus differs from other varieties of the species by having large flowers, reaching 11 centimeters long and magenta in color, and white spines.

== Distribution ==
Echinocereus fendleri is found in the United States (Arizona, New Mexico, Colorado, and Texas) and the neighboring Mexican states of Sonora and Chihuahua. Plants are found growing in on dry slopes and in rocky limestone areas growing in semidesert grasslands, chaparral, coniferous-oak woodlands at elevations of 900 to 2400 meters.

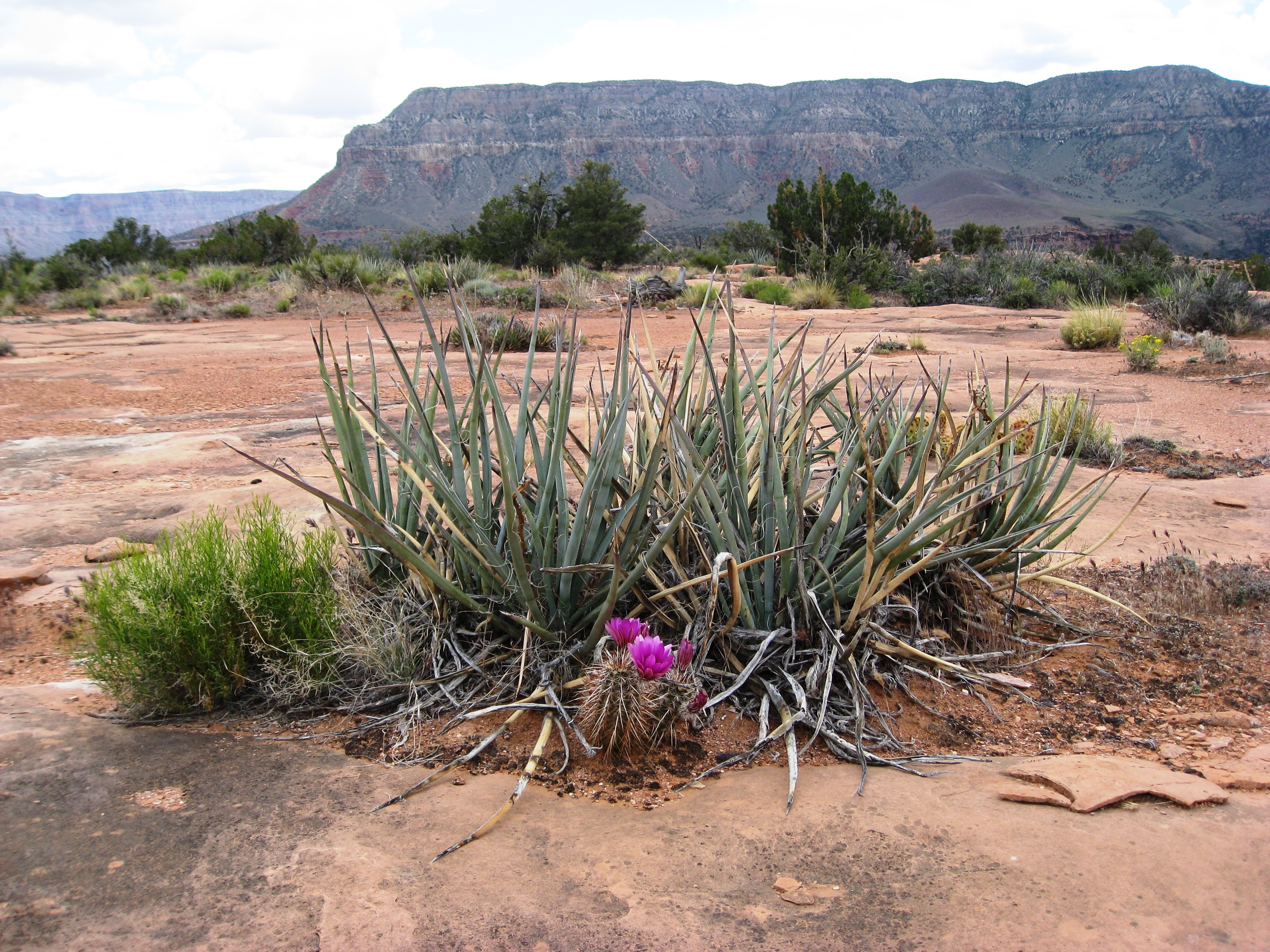
Echinocereus fendleri growing with Yucca in Arizona

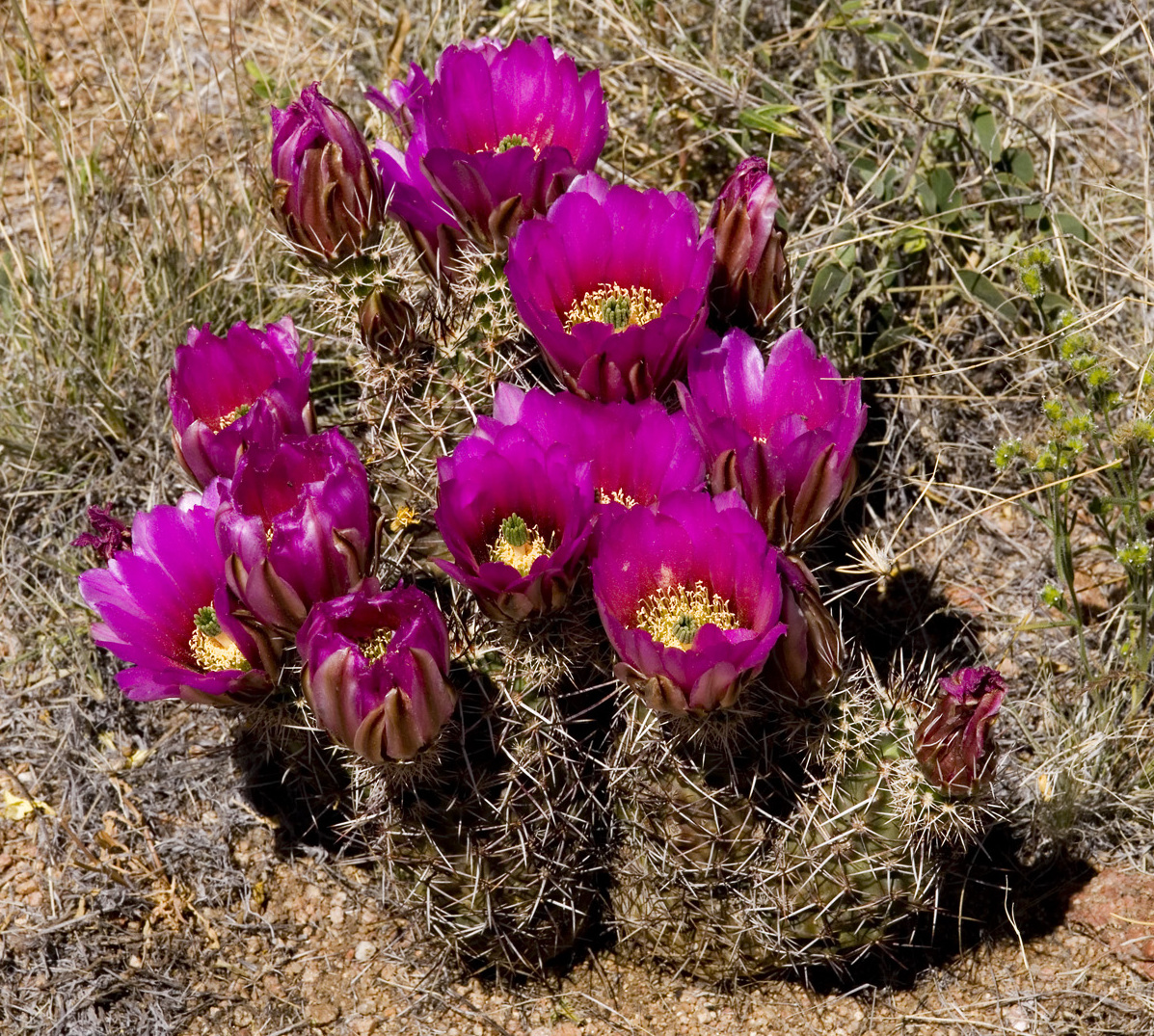
Plants growing in Mockingbird Gap, Socorro County, New Mexico

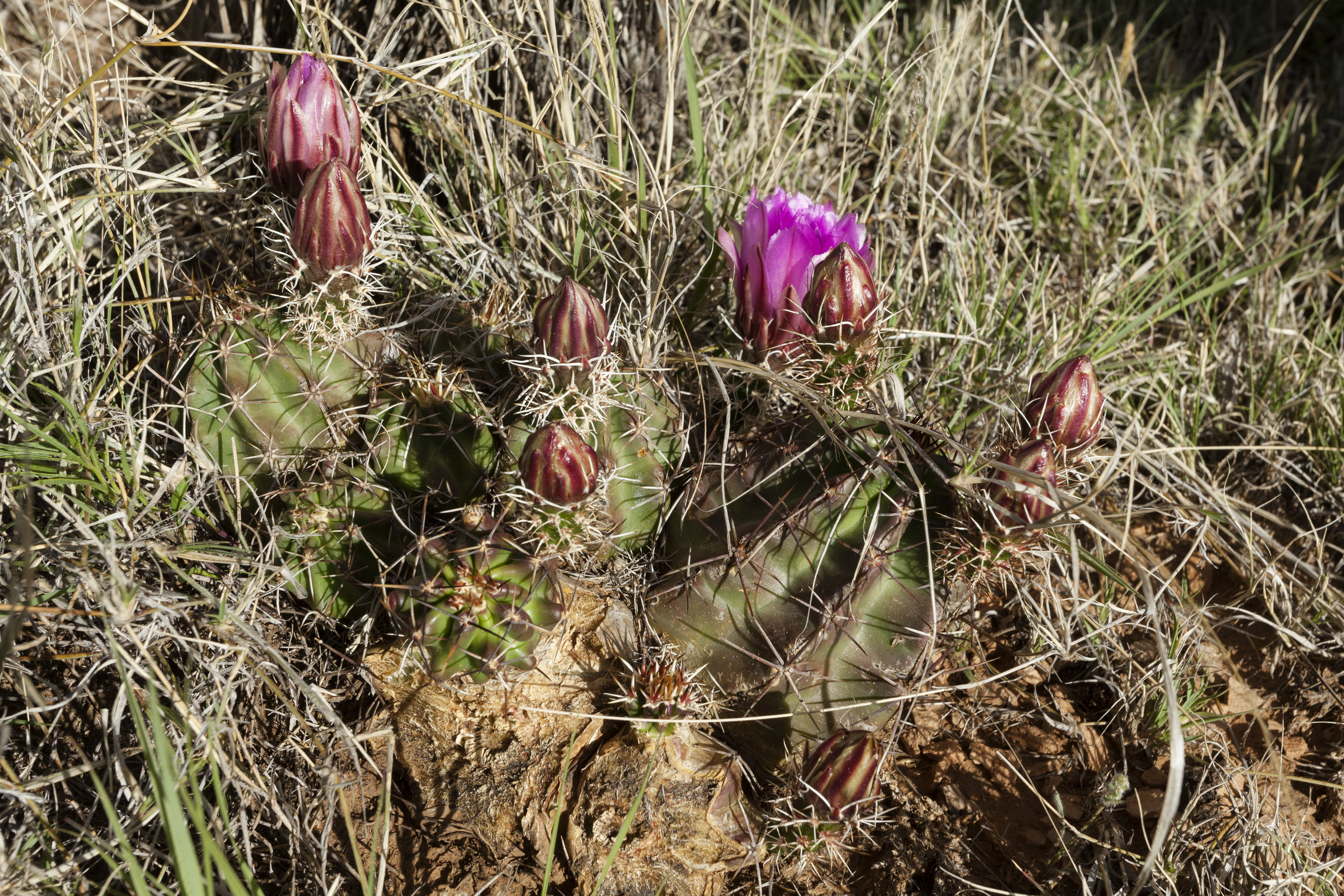
Plants growing in Big Pine Canyon, Lincoln County, New Mexico

== Taxonomy ==
First described as Cereus fendleri by George Engelmann in 1849, the species was named to honor German botanist August Fendler. Francisco Seitz placed the species in the genus Echinocereus in 1870.
