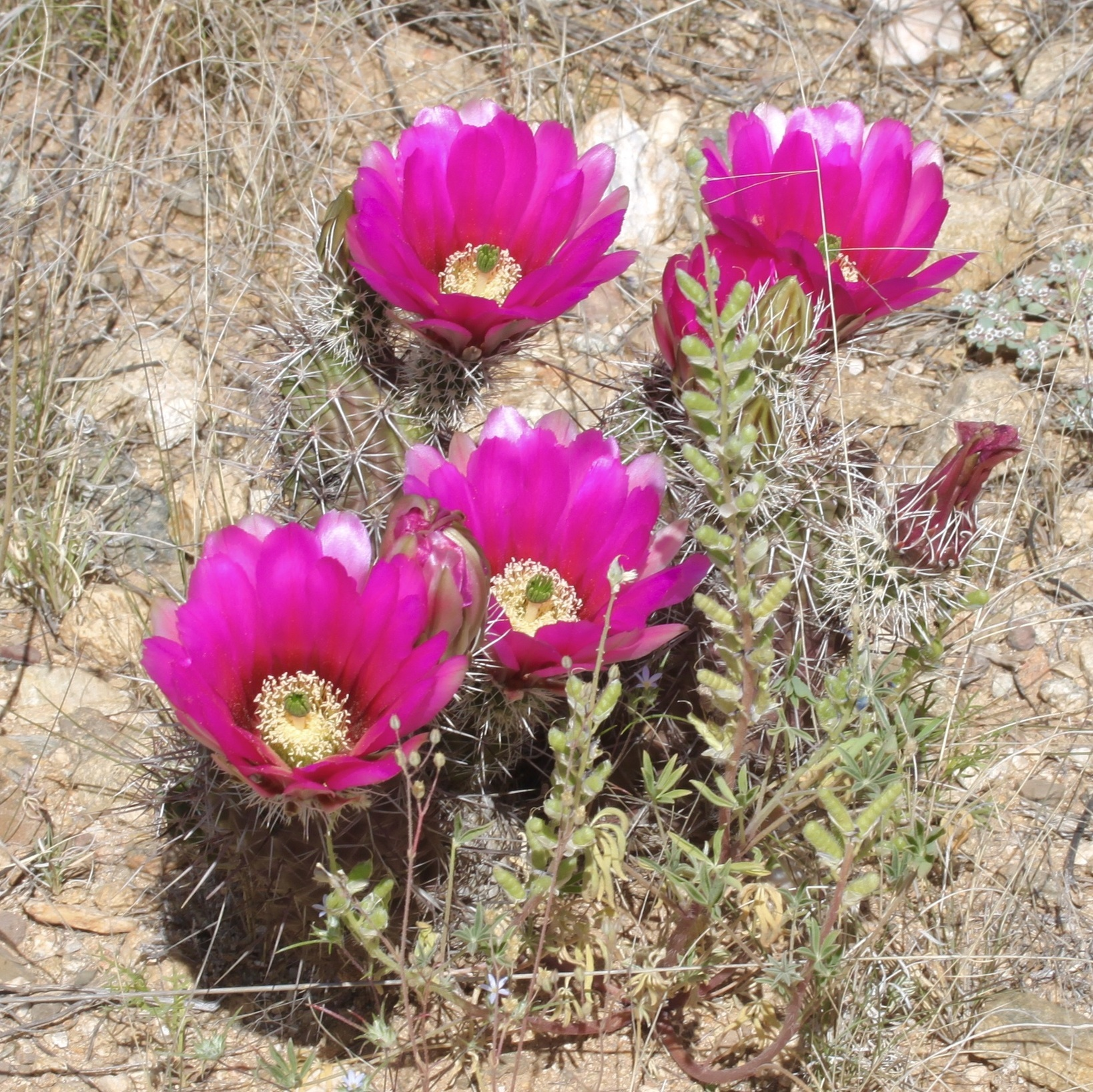

Conservation status
- Least Concern (IUCN 3.1)

Scientific classification
- Kingdom: Plantae
- Clade: Tracheophytes
- Clade: Angiosperms
- Clade: Eudicots
- Order: Caryophyllales
- Family: Cactaceae
- Subfamily: Cactoideae
- Genus: Echinocereus
- Species: E. fasciculatus

Binomial name
- Echinocereus fasciculatus (Engelm. ex B.D. Jacks.) L.D. Benson

Synonyms
- Cactus fasciculatus (Engelm. ex B.D.Jacks.) Kuntze 1891; Chilita fasciculata (Engelm. ex B.D.Jacks.) Buxb. 1954; Ebnerella fasciculata (Engelm. ex B.D.Jacks.) Buxb. 1951; Echinocereus engelmannii subsp. fasciculatus (Engelm. ex B.D.Jacks.) W.Blum & Mich.Lange 1998; Echinocereus fendleri var. fasciculatus (Engelm. ex B.D.Jacks.) N.P.Taylor 1985; Mammillaria fasciculata Engelm. 1895; Neomammillaria fasciculata (Engelm. ex B.D.Jacks.) Britton & Rose 1923

= Echinocereus fasciculatus =

Species of cactus

Echinocereus fasciculatus, commonly known as pinkflower hedgehog cactus, is a clumping cactus (Cactaceae) with brilliant magenta flowers and long spines found in the Sonoran Desert.

== Description ==
Echinocereus fasciculatus forms loose groups consisting of five to 20 shoots. The green cylindrical to elongated shoots are 16 to 45 centimeters long and have a diameter of 4 to 7.5 centimeters. The shoot surface is not completely covered by the spines. There are eight to 18 ribs that are not clearly tuberculated. The two to four straight, light-colored central spines have a darker tip and are 2.5 to 7.5 centimeters long. One of them stands out. The eleven to 13 spreading, straight, whitish or grayish marginal spines are 1.2 to 2 centimeters long.

The broadly funnel-shaped flowers are magenta to reddish purple. They appear in the upper half of the shoots, are 5 to 6.2 centimeters long and reach the same diameter. The spherical, fleshy, initially green fruits later turn red.

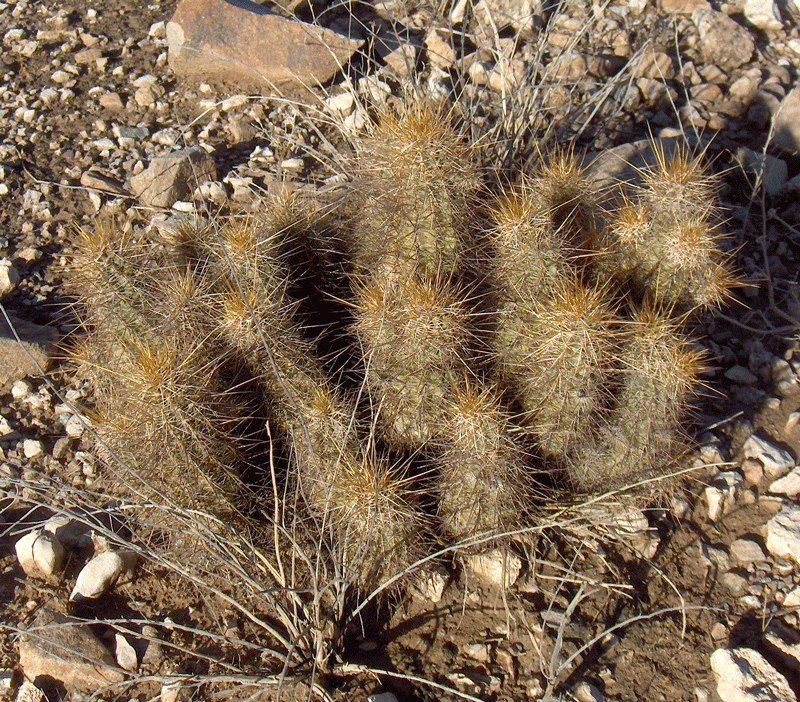

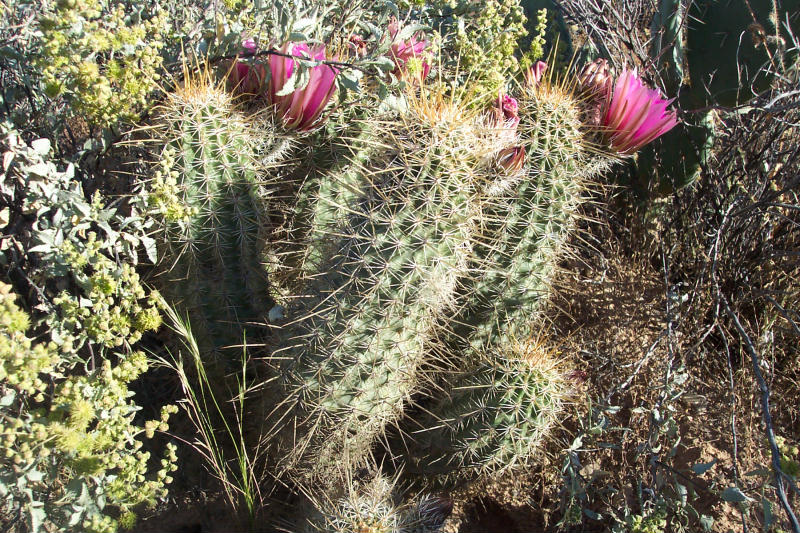

== Distribution ==
Echinocereus fasciculatus is distributed in the United States in the states of New Mexico and Arizona and in the neighboring Mexican state of Sonora.

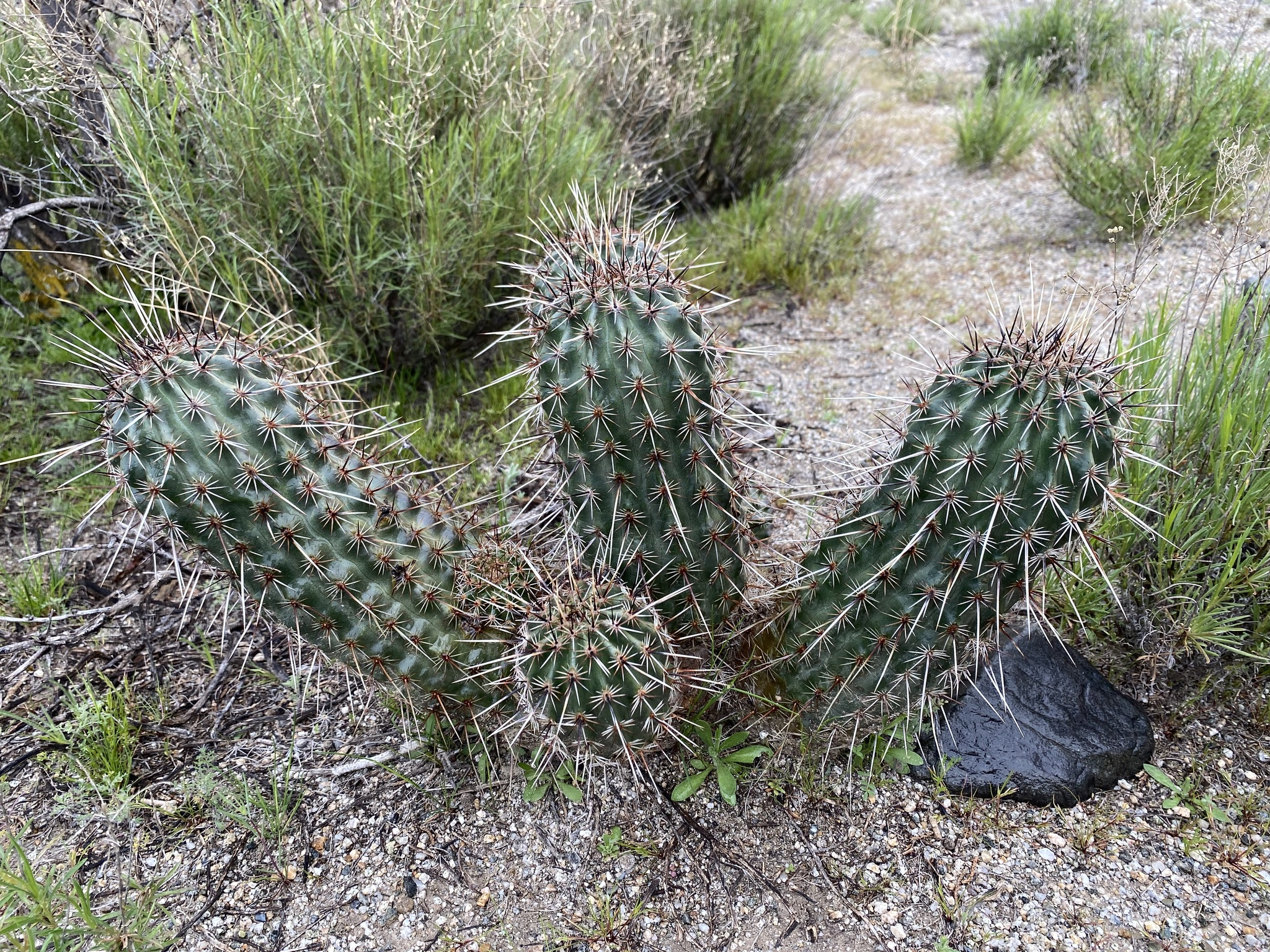
Echinocereus fasciculatus growing in Gila County, Arizona

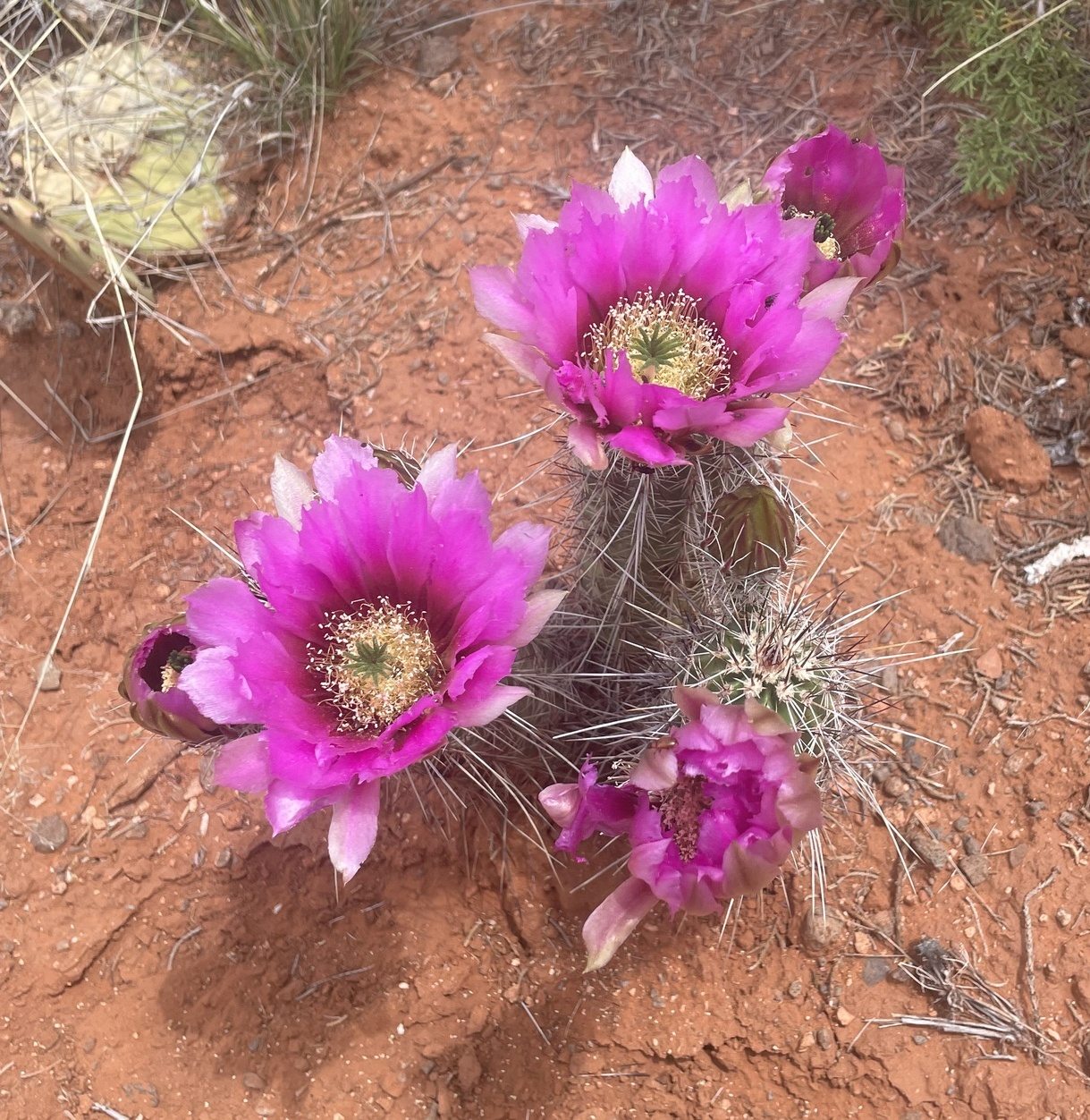
Habitat in Coconino National Forest, Rimrock, Arizona

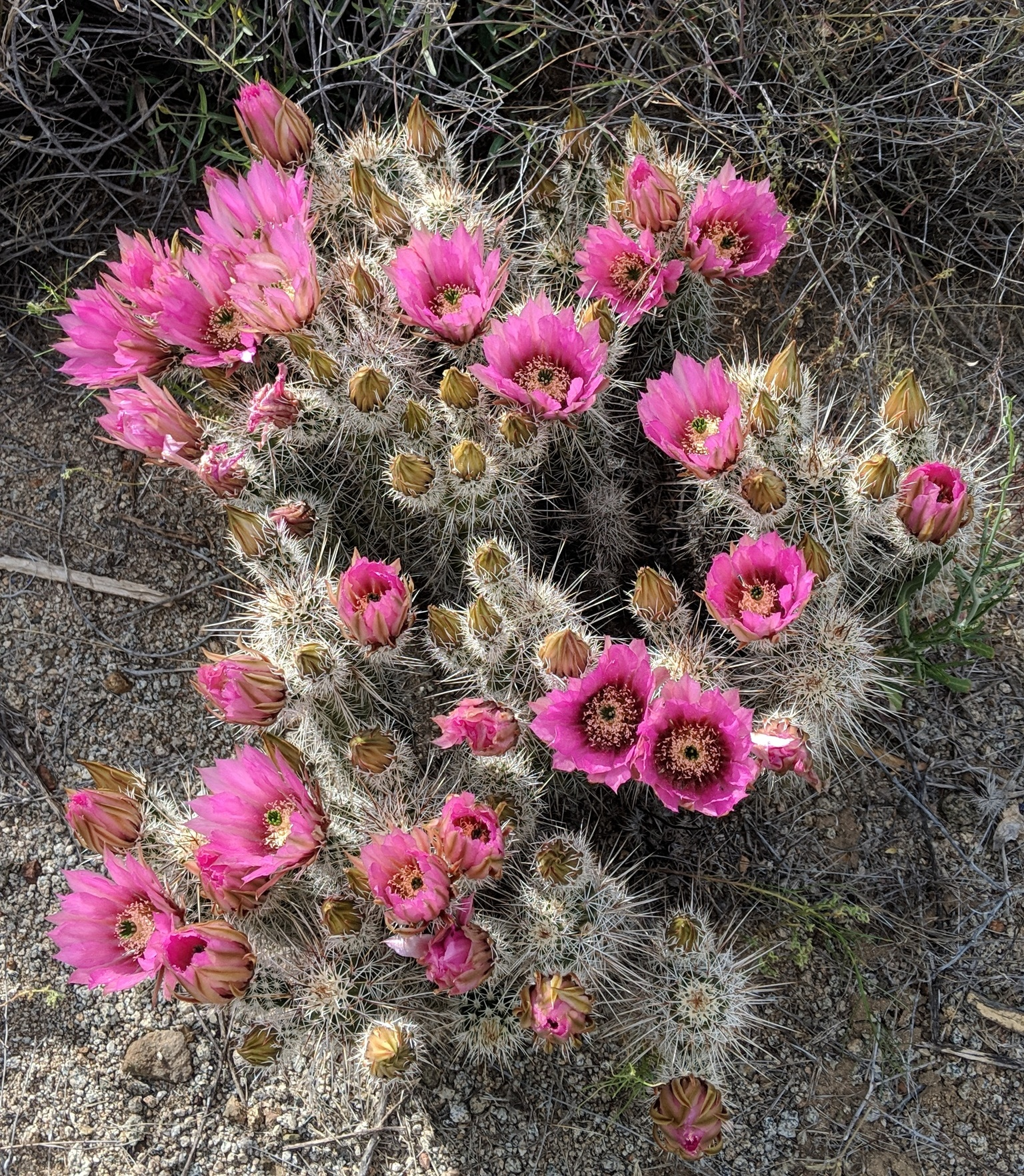
Habitat in Pima County, Arizona

== Taxonomy ==
The first description as Mammillaria fasciculata by Benjamin Daydon Jackson was published in 1895. The epithet fasciculatus comes from Latin, means 'densely packed together' and refers to the cluster-forming reed-like shoots of the species. Wolfgang Blum and Michael Lange introduced the species as a subspecies to the species Echinocereus engelmannii in 1998. Nomenclature synonyms are Cactus fasciculatus (Engelm. ex B.D.Jacks.) Kuntze (1891, nom. illegal ICBN article 53.1), Neomammillaria fasciculata (Engelm. ex B.D.Jacks.) Britton & Rose (1923), Echinocereus engelmannii subsp. fasciculatus (Engelm. ex B.D.Jacks.) W.Blum & Mich.Lange (1998) and Echinocereus fendleri var. fasciculatus (Engelm. ex B.D.Jacks.) N.P.Taylor (1985).
