= Augustus Fendler =

American natural history collector (1813-1883)

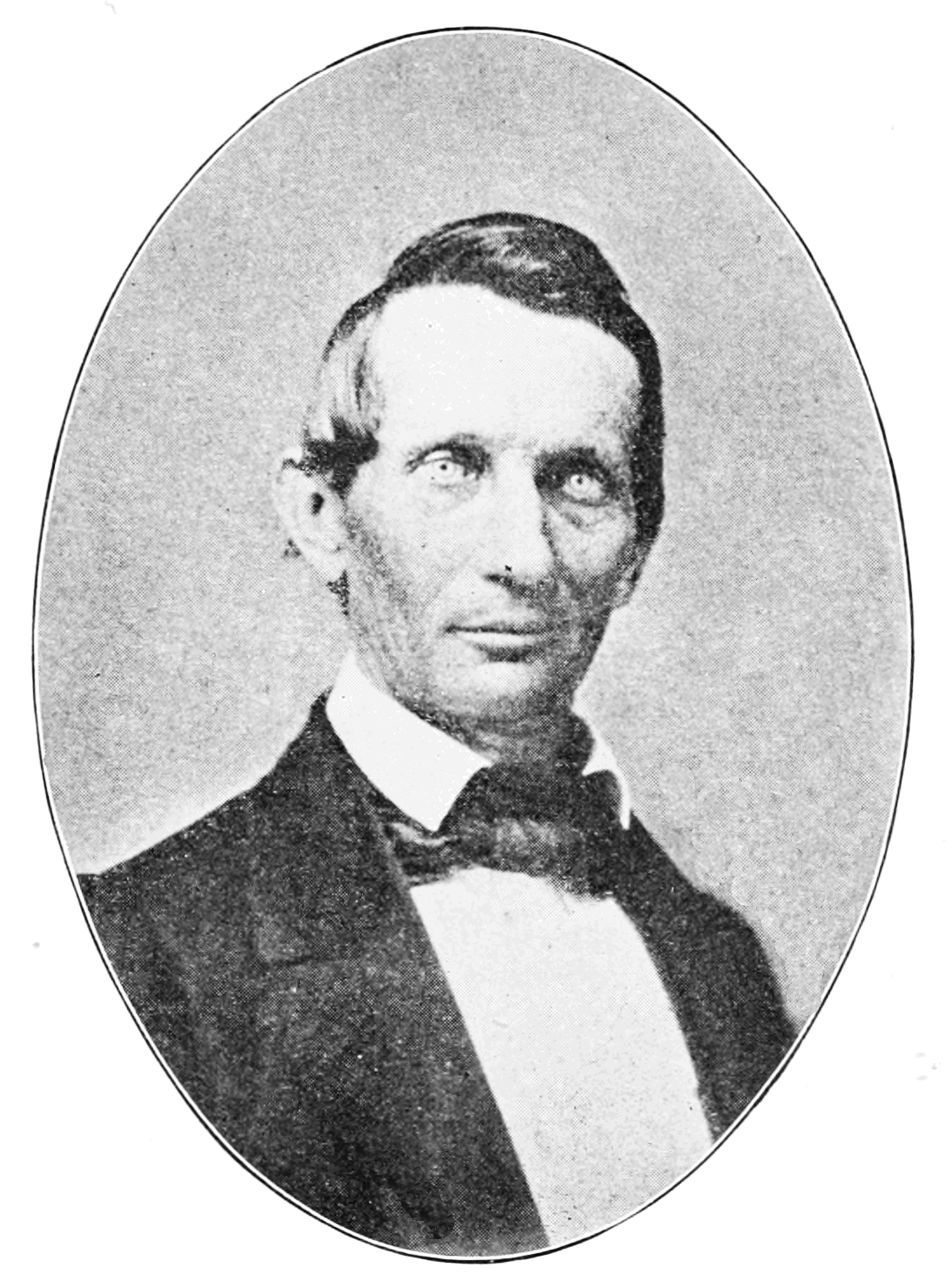
- Portrait of Augustus Fendler, ca. 1860
- Born: January 10, 1813; Gumbinnen, East Prussia
- Died: November 27, 1883 (aged 70); Port of Spain, Trinidad
- Scientific career
- Fields: Botany
- Author abbrev. (botany): Fendler

Augustus Fendler (January 10, 1813 – November 27, 1883), alternatively written as August Fendler, was a Prussian-born American natural history collector.

== Early travels ==
Fendler first attended preparatory school at the age of 12. After four years, he discontinued his education for financial reasons and apprenticed for the town clerk. He disliked the work, and yearned for travel.

Fendler gained his first taste of exploration as a physician's assistant. He partook in an inspection trip of the cholera quarantine camps on the Russian border of Prussia. Upon his return, he briefly worked as a tanner, then spent a year in a polytechnical school based in Berlin. He dropped out and found his way to Bremen, eventually sailing to Baltimore, Maryland in 1836.

Fendler initially found work as a tanner in Philadelphia, then moved to New York City and pursued lamp manufacturing. The panic of 1837 lead to the closing of his shop, and consequently, he left New York for St. Louis in 1838. He resumed working in the lamp business, but left the city shortly before Christmas the same year.

Fendler continued south through New Orleans, before heading west to Texas. He was granted a land permit in Houston, but abandoned the claim as he had no rifle nor interest in fighting Comanches to secure the land.

Yellow fever drove Fendler from Texas, and he became a school teacher in Illinois. Suddenly driven by the desire for a solitary life, he settled in a dilapidated log cabin on an island on the Missouri River near Wellington. He remained here for six months, surviving off of wild game and reading. He left after the island became flooded. In 1841, he returned to Königsberg, Prussia.

== Initial collections ==
Ernst Heinrich Friedrich Meyer, professor of botany at the University of Königsberg, convinced Fendler that he could make a profit collecting plant specimens. He went back to St. Louis with his brother, making the acquaintance of Georg Engelmann. Fendler began sending his specimens to Asa Gray at the behest of Engelmann. During the Mexican American War in 1846, Fendler traveled with the U.S Army to Santa Fe, New Mexico. He collected specimens throughout the year, once again returning to St. Louis in 1847. His collection is hailed as the first from this part of the country, and he collected over 17,000 specimens during this trip.

In 1849, he attempted to travel to the Great Salt Lake, but a flood stymied his progress. On his return to St. Louis, he found a fire destroyed all his possessions, personal collections, and travel journals. He left the city with his brother, and continued to New Orleans. He gathered supplies for a collecting trip at Engelmann's expense, and sailed to Chagres, Panama.

Fendler collected at the mouth of the Chagres River for four months. He arrived back in New Orleans on April 20, 1850, but continued up to Camden, Arkansas to make further collections. The Fendler brothers, running low on funds, opened up a gas lamp business in Memphis, Tennessee. Fendler continued to collect plants in his spare time, and began running horticultural experiments with some of the specimens he collected. He reported his data to Engelmann and the Smithsonian Institution. By late 1853, the lamp business became unprofitable and Fendler sought to move again.

== Venezuelan collections ==
On the December 24, 1853, the Fendlers left New York harbor for Venezuela. They arrived at La Guaira on January 21, 1854, and Fendler immediately began collecting plants. Although initially hoping to settle in Caracas, the expensive cost of living in the city prompted them to purchase a small farm near Colonia Tovar. In Venezuela, he not only collected plants, but also operated meteorological studies during his stay. He collaborated with Joseph Henry of the Smithsonian Institution, who published his observations.

After two years of collecting in Colonia Tovar, Fendler was forced to take longer excursions to find new specimens. He traveled from Maracai to Puerto Colombia, as well as from Valencia to San Estevan. He also traveled from Petaquire to the Atlantic coast. Fendler visited the United States in 1856, selling moss specimens to William Starling Sullivant and lichen specimens to Edward Tuckerman. His moss collections from 1854 to 1855 were determined by the bryologist Karl Müller and distributed by August Schrader in 1879 as exsiccata with the title Musci Venezuelenses, determ. C. Mueller. Legit. A. Fendler 1854-5. Specimens collected by Fendler were also distributed to herbaria worldwide in two moss series named Musci Boreali-Americani, sive specimina exsiccata muscorum in Americae Respublicis Foederatis detectorum, conjunctis studiis W. S. Sullivant et L. Lesquereux (1857, 1866) and in the lichen series Reliquiae Tuckermanianae (1937-1942).

== Later life ==
The Fendlers returned to St. Louis in 1864, and they purchased a densely wooded tract of land in Allenton, Missouri. They cleared the land and homesteaded for the next 7 years. Fendler accepted a short-term offer from Asa Gray to work as his curator in Cambridge, Massachusetts. The brothers sold the farm in 1871, and visited Germany. Here, Fendler improved his botanical knowledge through visits with Johann Caspary and Alexander Braun. The brothers returned to the United States in 1873.

The brothers initially settled in Wilmington, Delaware, with Fendler finding employment arranging herbarium specimens for William Marriott Canby. Here he continued making meteorological observations for Engelmann. Discomfort caused by rheumatism had Fendler searching for a place with a fairer climate. Fendler therefore moved to Port of Spain, Trinidad in 1877.

Fendler continued collecting plants and corresponding with Canby, Gray and Engelmann until his death on November 27, 1883.

== Eponyms ==
=== Genera ===
- (Hydrangeaceae) Fendlera Engelm. & A.Gray
- (Hydrangeaceae) Fendlerella (Greene) A.Heller

=== Species ===
- (Adiantaceae) Argyrochosma fendleri (Kunze) Windham
- (Annonaceae) Annona fendleri (R.E.Fr.) H.Rainer
- (Apiaceae) Tiedemannia fendleri J.M.Coult. & Rose
- (Apocynaceae) Amblyanthera fendleri Müll.Arg.
- (Araceae) Monstera fendleri Engl.
- (Araliaceae) Dendropanax fendleri Seem.
- (Asclepiadaceae) Funastrum fendleri Schltr.
- (Asteraceae) Heteropleura fendleri (Sch.Bip.) Rydb.
- (Blechnaceae) Spicanta fendleri (Hook.) Kuntze
- (Cactaceae) Echinocereus fendleri (Engelm.) Sencke ex J.N.Haage
- (Malvaceae) Sphaeralcea fendleri A.Gray
- (Orthotrichaceae) Macromitrium fendleri Müll.Hal.
- (Ranunculaceae) Thalictrum fendleri Engelm. ex A.Gray
- (Selaginellaceae) Selaginella fendleri (Underw.) Hieron.

== Publications ==
- Fendler, Augustus. The Mechanism of the Universe, and Its Primary Effort-Exerting Powers. The Nature of Force and the Constitution of Matter. Commercial Printing Co., 1874.

The standard author abbreviation Fendler is used to indicate this person as the author when citing a botanical name.
