= Roush =

Roush is a surname. Notable people with the surname include:

== Business ==
- Roush Performance, American high-performance auto parts company

== Politics ==
- Glenn Roush (1934–2020), American politician in Montana
- J. Edward Roush (1920–2004), United States Representative for Indiana, namesake of:
  - J. Edward Roush Lake, a reservoir in Huntington, Indiana
  - J.E. Roush Fish and Wildlife Area, in Huntington, Indiana

== Science ==
- Chris Roush (born 1964), American economist
- Eva Myrtelle Roush (1886–1954), American botanist
- William R. Roush (born 1952), American chemist

== Sports ==
- Edd Roush (1893–1988), American baseball player
- Jack Roush (born 1942), American auto racing entrepreneur, owner of:
  - Roush Fenway Racing, a NASCAR team
  - Roush Performance, an automotive company
- John Roush (American football) (born 1953), American college football player at Oklahoma
- Sam Roush (born 2003), American football player

== Other ==
- Gerald Roush (1941–2010), American sports car expert
- J. Levi Roush (1838–1906), American soldier and Medal of Honor recipient
- Jane Marum Roush (born 1956), American lawyer and judge
- Jerry Roush (born 1986), American musician
- John A. Roush, American academic administrator
- Patricia Roush, American activist against international child abduction
- Sherrilyn Roush, American philosopher

== See also ==
- Reusch (disambiguation)
- Ruche (disambiguation)
- Rausch (disambiguation)
