= Echinopsis oligotricha =

Conservation status
- Endangered (IUCN 3.1)

Scientific classification
- Kingdom: Plantae
- Clade: Tracheophytes
- Clade: Angiosperms
- Clade: Eudicots
- Order: Caryophyllales
- Family: Cactaceae
- Subfamily: Cactoideae
- Genus: Echinopsis
- Species: E. oligotricha

Binomial name
- Echinopsis oligotricha (Cárdenas) M.Lowry

Synonyms
- Cinnabarinea oligotricha (Cárdenas) F.Ritter, 1980; Lobivia acanthoplegma var. oligotricha (Cárdenas) Gertel & R.Wahl, 2004; Lobivia cinnabarina var. oligotricha (Cárdenas) Rausch ex G.D.Rowley, 1982; Lobivia cinnabarina subvar. oligotricha (Cárdenas) Rausch, 1975; Lobivia oligotricha Cárdenas, 1963 (basionym); Weingartia jarmilae Halda & Horáček, 2000

Species of cactus

Echinopsis oligotricha is a species of succulent flowering plant in the genus Echinopsis, within the family Cactaceae. It is endemic to the department of Cochabamba in central Bolivia.

== Description ==
Echinopsis oligotricha is a species of small, low-growing cactus that usually grows solitary (unless damaged; this can cause lateral offshoots to emerge). The stem is green in color and globose to flattened-globose in shape. It reaches a diameter of approximately 15 cm.

Spines

This species has approximately 26 ribs, which are pronounced and divided into tubercles. The tubercles can measure up to 1.5 cm in length. The areoles develop approximately 10 awl-shaped radial spines, which grow to 2 cm in length. These spines are extended over the stem, and can appear intertwined. Central spines are often absent.

The flowers develop laterally from the more basal areoles. They measure up to 5 cm in both length and diameter. They are odorless, and are pink-purple to red in color, with a lighter-colored or off-white throat. The floral tube is often glabrous, or with few trichomes. The flowers of this species open during the daytime.

Plant in flower

The fruit is globose to oval in shape. It is semi-dry in consistency, and splits open when mature via perpendicular slits. The seeds are spherical, rough, gray, and covered by skin remnants.

== Distribution and habitat ==
Echinopsis oligotricha is native to the department of Cochabamba in central Bolivia.

It is primarily found in desert or dry shrubland biomes at altitudes of 2700 and 3400 meters above sea level. It grows both in flat areas (many of which are suitable for agriculture) and on slopes that were originally covered by sparse forests which have been destroyed by human activity.

== Taxonomy ==
This species was first described as Lobivia oligotricha, a name published in 1963 by the Bolivian botanist Martín Cárdenas Hermosa in the scientific journal Cactus (Paris) 78: 92.

Later, the British botanist Martin Lowry transferred the species to the genus Echinopsis, renaming it Echinopsis oligotricha. He registered these changes in the scientific journal Cactaceae Systematics Initiatives 19: 12, published in 2005.

Etymology

- Echinopsis: the genus name is derived from the Latin term ĕchīnus (meaning "hedgehog") and the Greek term opsis (meaning "appearing similar to"); this refers to the globose, spiny stems present in many species of this genus.
- oligotricha: the specific epithet is derived from the Greek words oligos (meaning "few") and thrix (meaning "hair"), in reference to the low density of hairs on this species' floral tube.

== Conservation status ==
On the IUCN Red List, Echinopsis oligotricha is classified as being Endangered (EN). Its native range is situated mainly in flat areas suitable for agriculture, resulting in habitat destruction due to expansion of farms and change in land use.

Urbanization also presents a significant threat. The westernmost population of the species has already been driven to local extinction due to the expansion of the city of Cochabamba.

== Cultivation ==
Echinopsis oligotricha is primarily cultivated as an ornamental. It grows during the summer, and is easy to grow. During the summer, it may be watered regularly (although care should be taken not to overwater). It requires a very porous and well-drained substrate. In winter, it should be kept dry.

During the growing season, it is recommend to use a potassium-rich fertilizer. This species is quite cold-hardy: it can tolerate temperatures as low as -12 °C (10.4 °F) if kept completely dry. It does best in full sun (or part-sun during the summer).

It may be propagated by sowing seeds after the last frost (or indoors) or by removing and rooting the pups (offshoots) produced by the plant.
