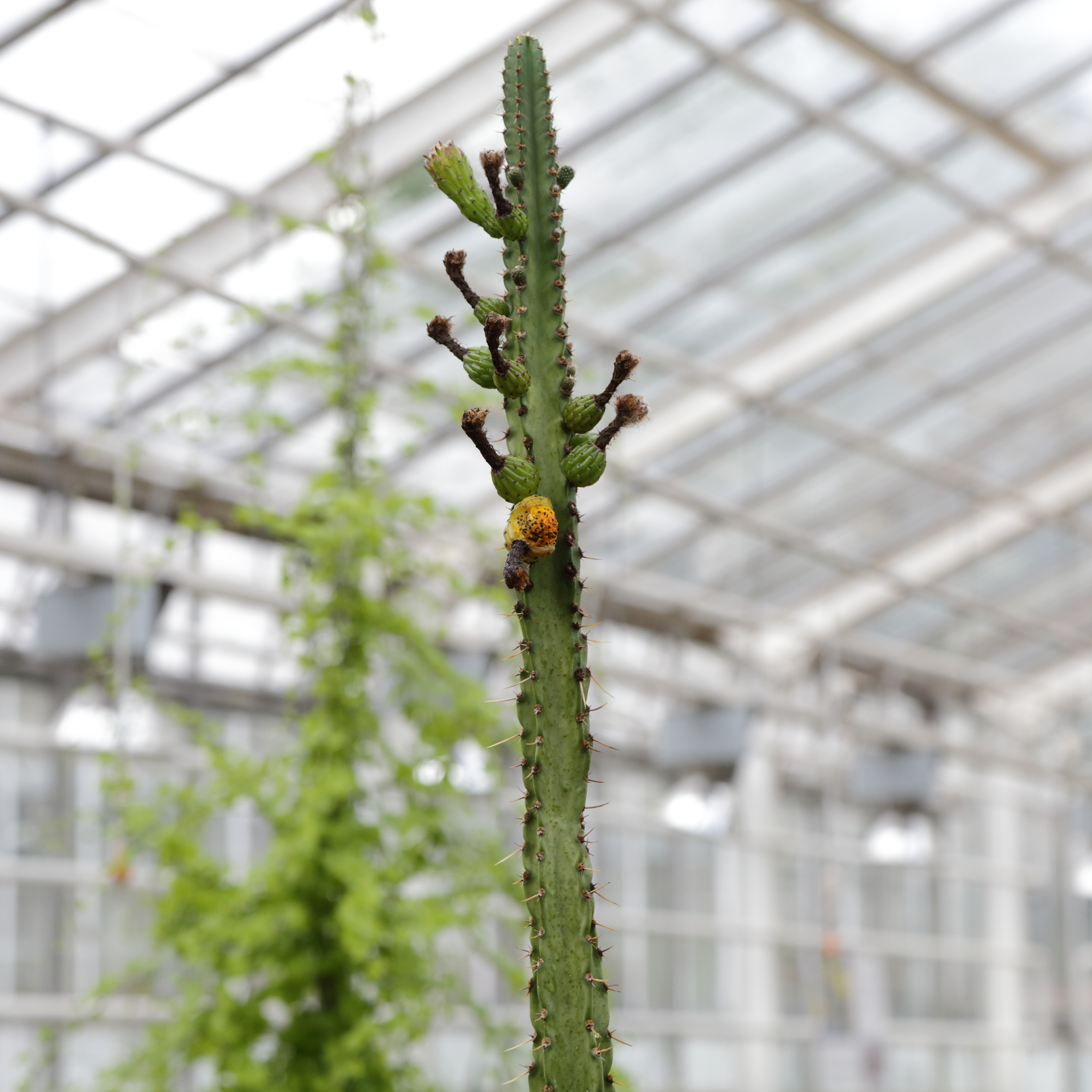
- Samaipaticereus corroanus

Scientific classification
- Kingdom: Plantae
- Clade: Tracheophytes
- Clade: Angiosperms
- Clade: Eudicots
- Order: Caryophyllales
- Family: Cactaceae
- Subfamily: Cactoideae
- Tribe: Cereeae
- Subtribe: Trichocereinae
- Genus: Samaipaticereus; Cárdenas 1952

Type species
- Samaipaticereus corroanus

Species
- See text

= Samaipaticereus =

Genus of cacti

Samaipaticereus is a genus of cactus containing two species. It is known only from East Andean Bolivia and Peru.

== Description ==
Samaipaticereus grows tree-like and columnar, and is heavily branched and reaches heights of 2 to 4 meters. The green, long, upright shoots are not articulated and reach a diameter of up to 8 centimeters. Five spines usually arise from the areoles of the four to six ribs, which cannot be differentiated into central and radial spines. They are short and greyish white, one of them longer than the others and pointing downwards.

The numerous, constricted, funnel-shaped flowers are 4.5 to 5 centimeters long, open at night and remain open until the following day. The sepals are greenish white with brown tips, the petals are white. The pericarpel and the flower tube are covered with long scales, short hairs and some bristles.

The spherical, truncated, tuberous fruits are more or less pink, have a perennial remnant of flowers and tear open lengthwise. The pulp is reddish-orange. The dark brown or blackish seeds are shiny, about 1.5 millimeters long and tiny dotted. The hilum is wide.

== Taxonomy ==
The first description, by Martín Cárdenas, was published in 1952. The genus name is derived from the town of Samaipata in Bolivia, near where the species was first collected. For the second species described, Samaipaticereus inquisivensis, the genus Yungasocereus was established by Friedrich Ritter in 1980. A third species, Samaipaticereus herrerae, is a newly derived species from the Peruvian population of Samaipaticereus corroanus.

== Species ==
Image	Scientific name	Distribution
	Samaipaticereus corroanus (Cárdenas) N.P.Taylor	Peru, Bolivia
	Samaipaticereus herrerae L.E.Alomía	Peru (Cusco)

== Distribution ==
Samaipaticereus corroanus is distributed in Peru (Cuzco) and eastern Bolivia.
