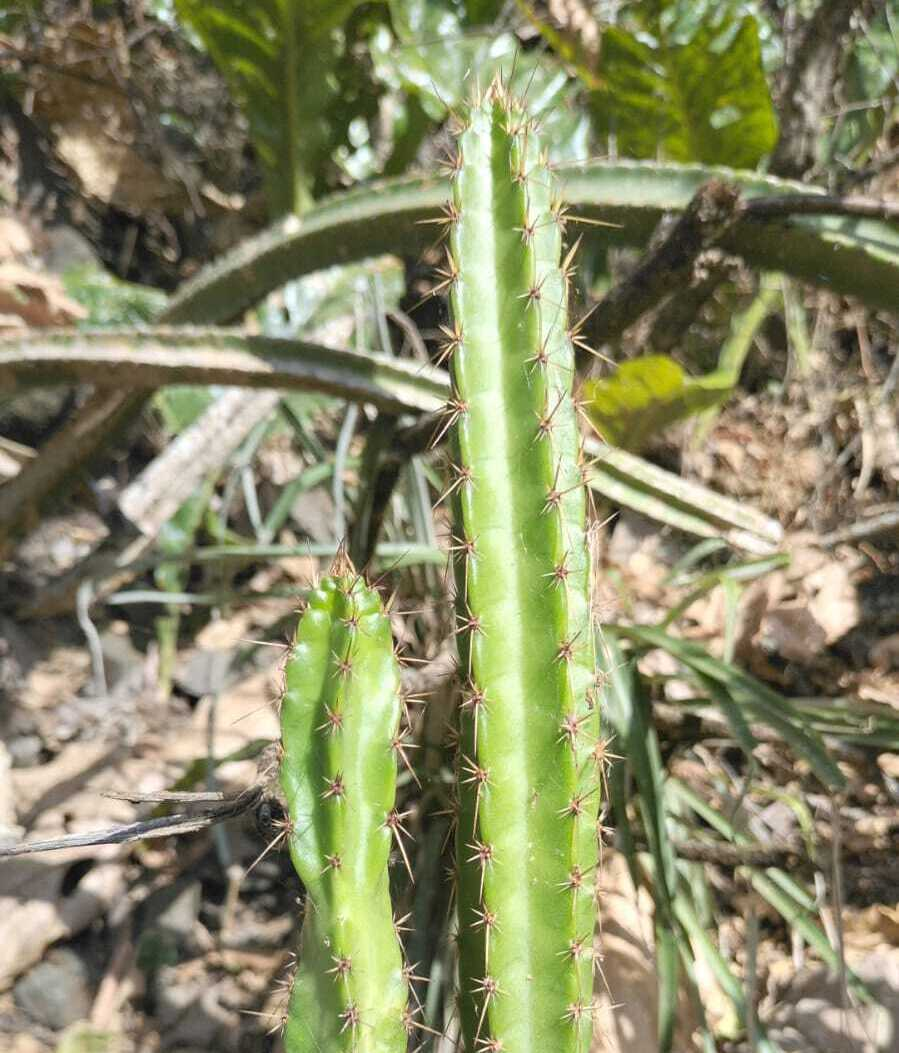

Scientific classification
- Kingdom: Plantae
- Clade: Tracheophytes
- Clade: Angiosperms
- Clade: Eudicots
- Order: Caryophyllales
- Family: Cactaceae
- Subfamily: Cactoideae
- Genus: Samaipaticereus
- Species: S. herrerae

Binomial name
- Samaipaticereus herrerae L.E.Alomía

= Samaipaticereus herrerae =

Species of cactus

Samaipaticereus herrerae is a species of cactus native to Peru formerly considered a geographical variant of Samaipaticereus corroanus.

== Description ==
Samaipaticereus herrerae is a heavily treelike cactus growing 3-4 meters tall. The pale green stems have 4 to 7 ribs, erect to arched, arcuate, and unsegmented with a diameter of 5-7 cm. 5 to 17 orange to grey spines arise from brownish areoles 2-3 mm in diameter and 1.5 cm apart.

The infundibuliform nocturnal flowers (5 cm long) only arise from subapical areoles. The flowers have white petals. Fruits are ovoid, 3 cm in length, and indistinctly ribbed. Seeds are larger than that of Samaipaticereus corroanus.

== Distribution ==
This species is found growing in Cusco department of Peru at elevations between 900–1300 meters. Plants are found growing along with Brasiliopuntia brasiliensis, Cereus vargasianus , and Rhipsalis baccifera

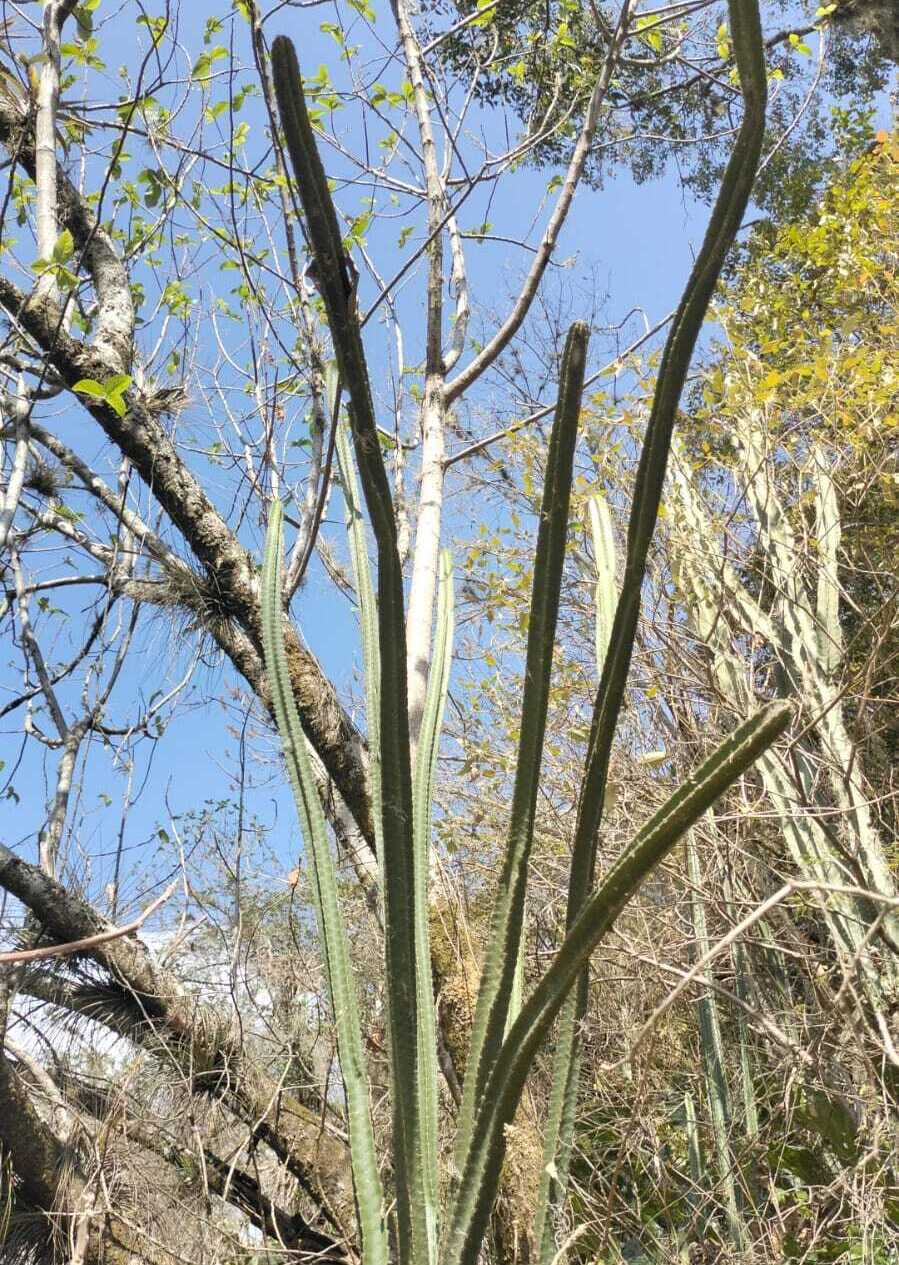
Habitat in La Convención, Peru

== Taxonomy ==
Samaipaticereus herrerae was formerly considered a geographical form of Samaipaticereus corroanus. It was circumscribed due to subtle morphological differences of the two populations. The plant was name after Fortunato Luciano Herrera who discovered the species.
