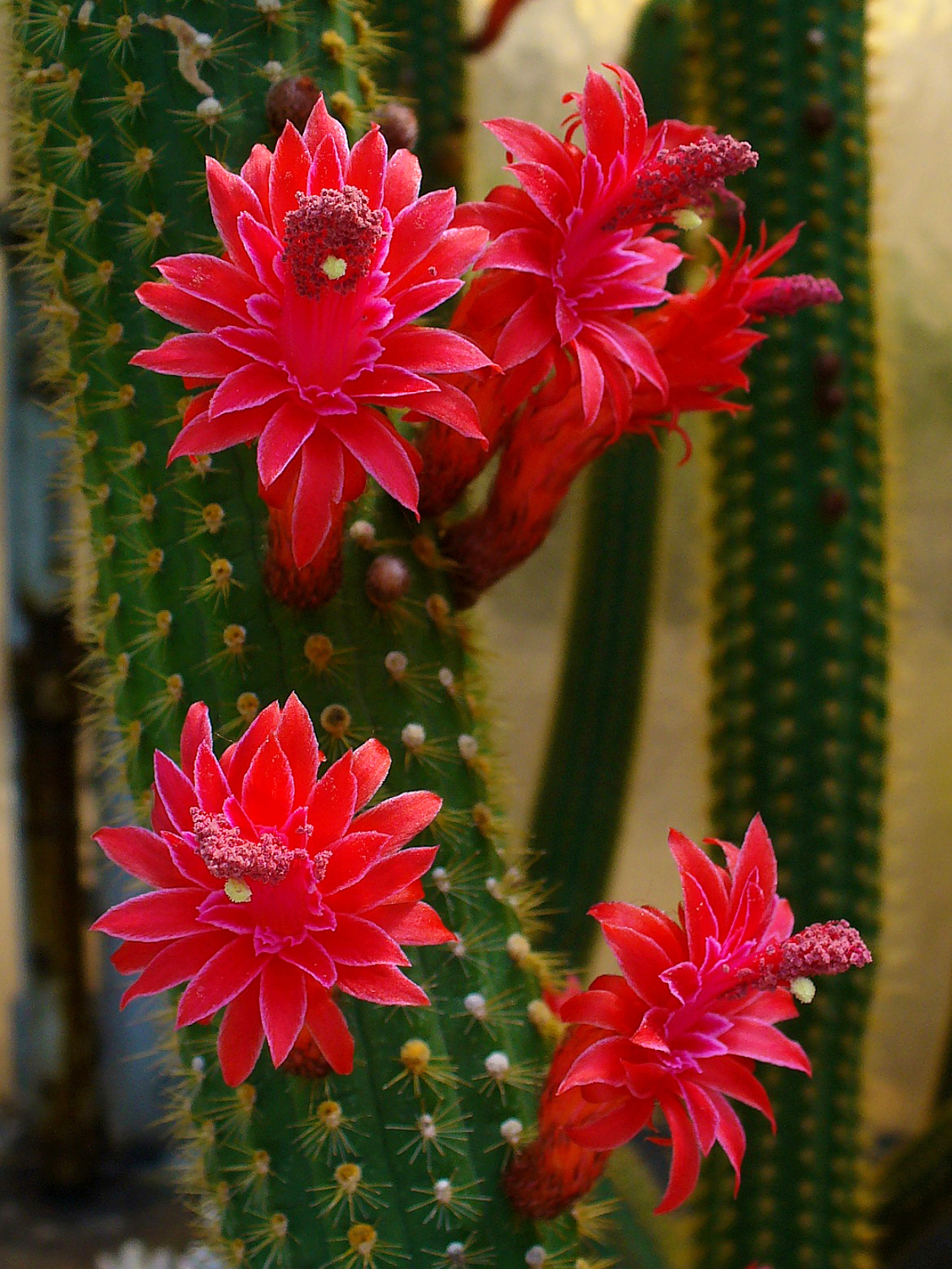
- KIT Botanical Garden

Conservation status
- Least Concern (IUCN 3.1)

Scientific classification
- Kingdom: Plantae
- Clade: Tracheophytes
- Clade: Angiosperms
- Clade: Eudicots
- Order: Caryophyllales
- Family: Cactaceae
- Subfamily: Cactoideae
- Genus: Cleistocactus
- Species: C. samaipatanus

Binomial name
- Cleistocactus samaipatanus (Cárdenas) D.R.Hunt

Synonyms
- Bolivicereus brevicaulis F.Ritter; Bolivicereus croceus F.Ritter; Bolivicereus rufus F.Ritter; Bolivicereus samaipatanus Cárdenas; Borzicactus samaipatanus (Cárdenas) Kimnach; Cleistocactus samaipatensis (Cárdenas) D.R. Hunt

= Cleistocactus samaipatanus =

Species of cactus

Cleistocactus samaipatanus is a species of flowering plant in the family Cactaceae, native to Bolivia.

== Description ==
Cleistocactus samaipatanus grows to 1.5 m (4.9 ft) tall, it has multiple long, forms branched groups from the base with some upright trunks with diameters of 3.5 to 4 cm (0.11 to 0.13 ft), narrow columnar green stems with pale gold spines. The low, transversely furrowed 14 to 16 ribs are 2 millimeters high and 7 millimeters wide. The areoles sit on them at a distance of 3 to 4 millimeters, which are initially brownish felt-like on top. From them radiate 13 to 22 thin, unequal spines 4 to 30 millimeters long. These are whitish-ash colored, pale yellowish or brownish.

It grows vigorously with large, pinky-red flowers in summer. The 4 cm long flowers are very crooked and have narrow, looser and reflexed, pointed sepals that are purple. The corolla is slightly compressed. The linear petals are blood red and are up to 15 millimeters long. There is a wool ring at the bottom of the tube. The stamens are in two rows and have dark purple anthers. The handle does not protrude.

The small, spherical fruits are 9 to 11 millimeters long and 7 to 9 millimeters wide. They are densely woolly white and brown with an attached flower remnant and contain tiny blackish-brown or black seeds.

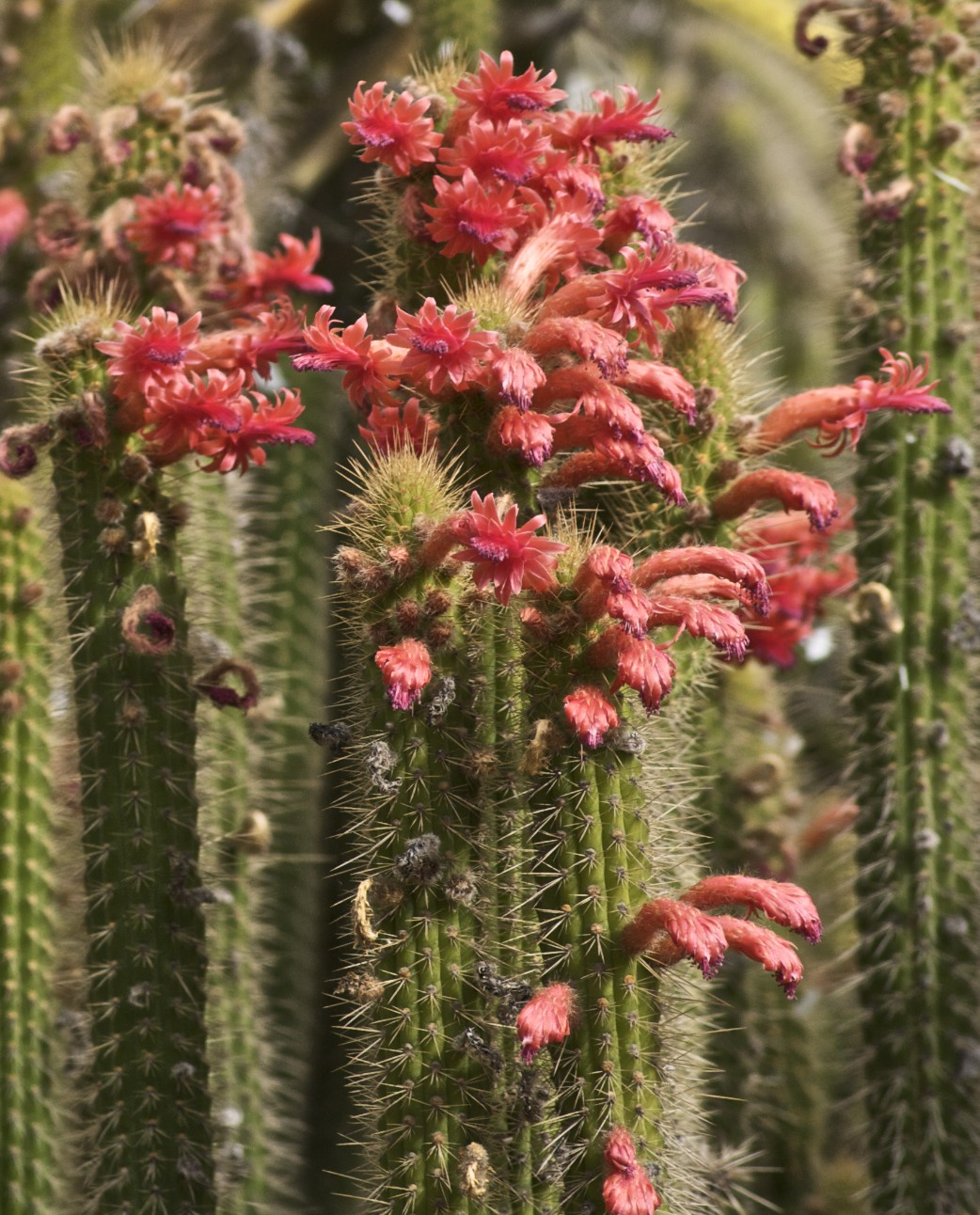

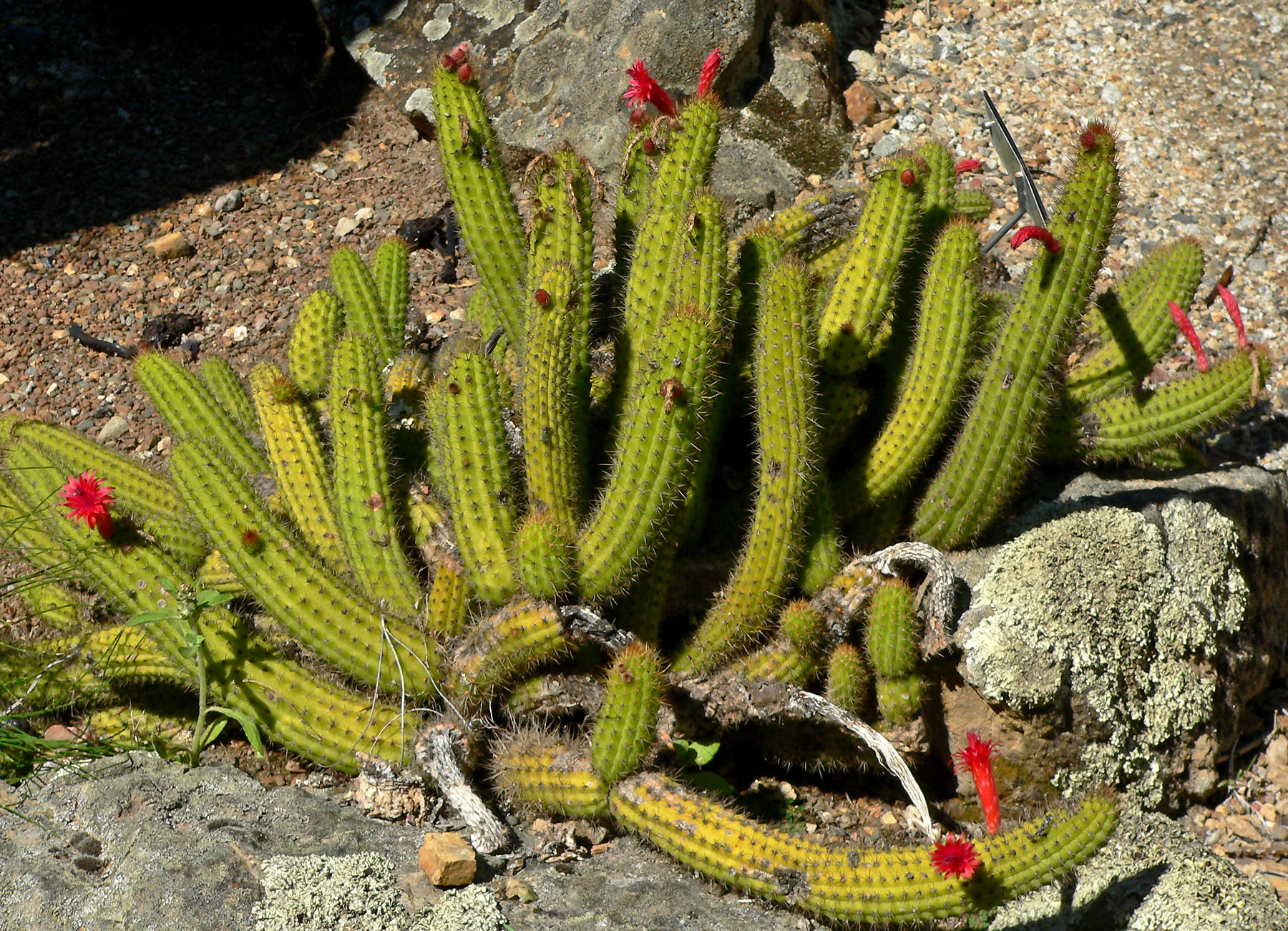
University of California Botanical Garden

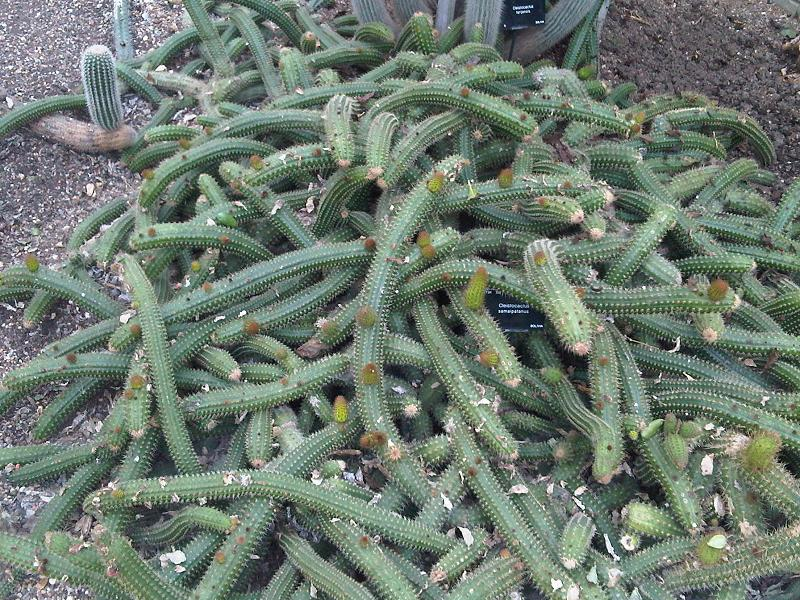
Kew Gardens

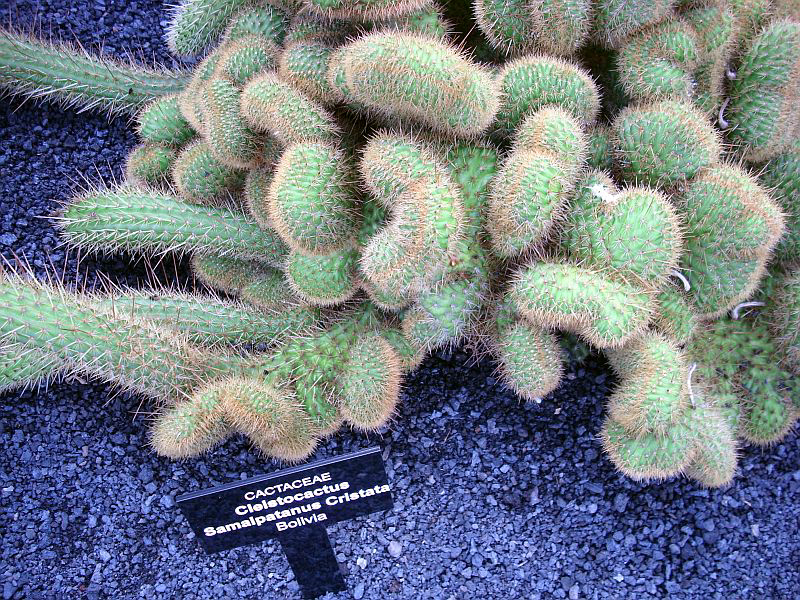
'Cristata'

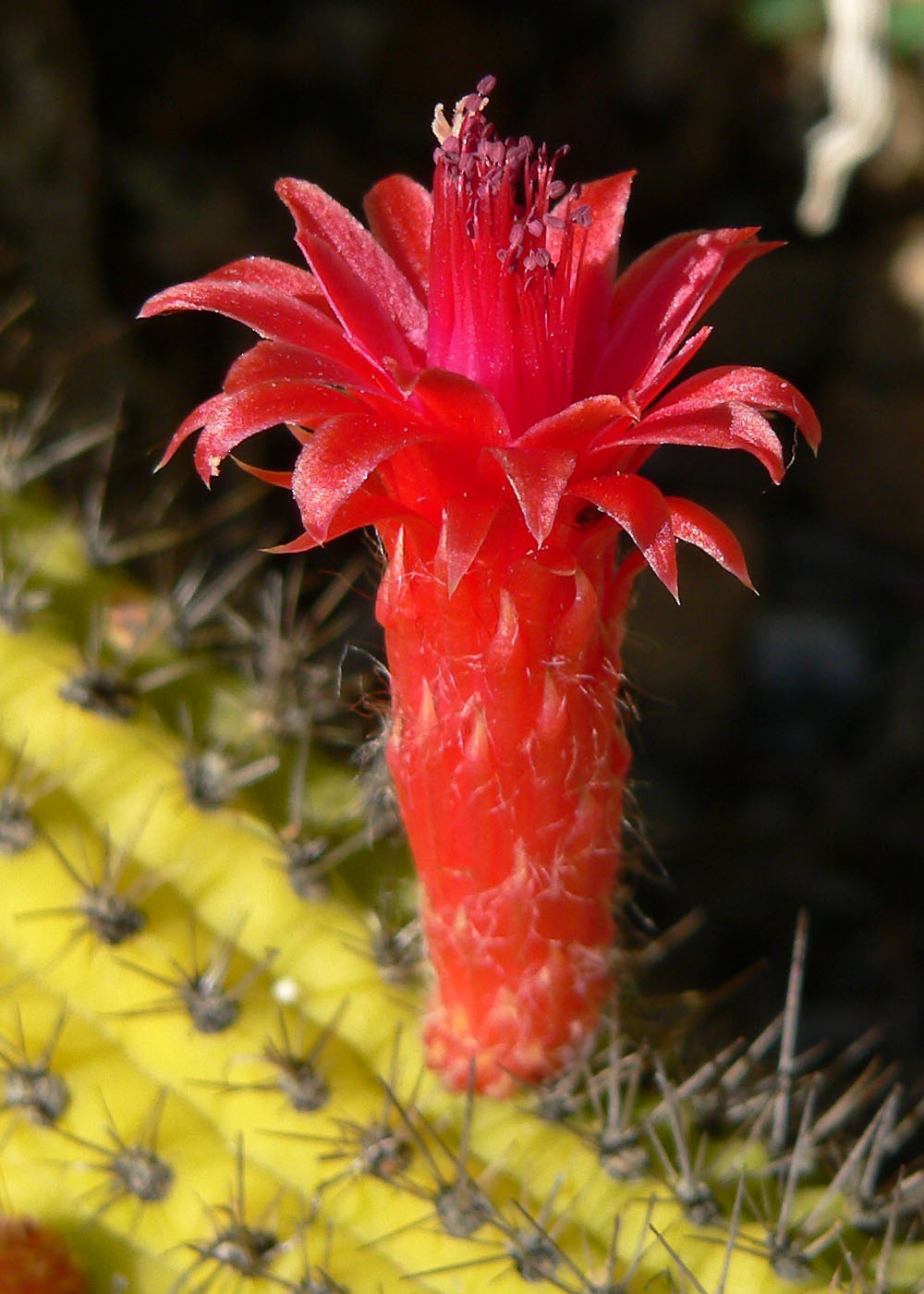

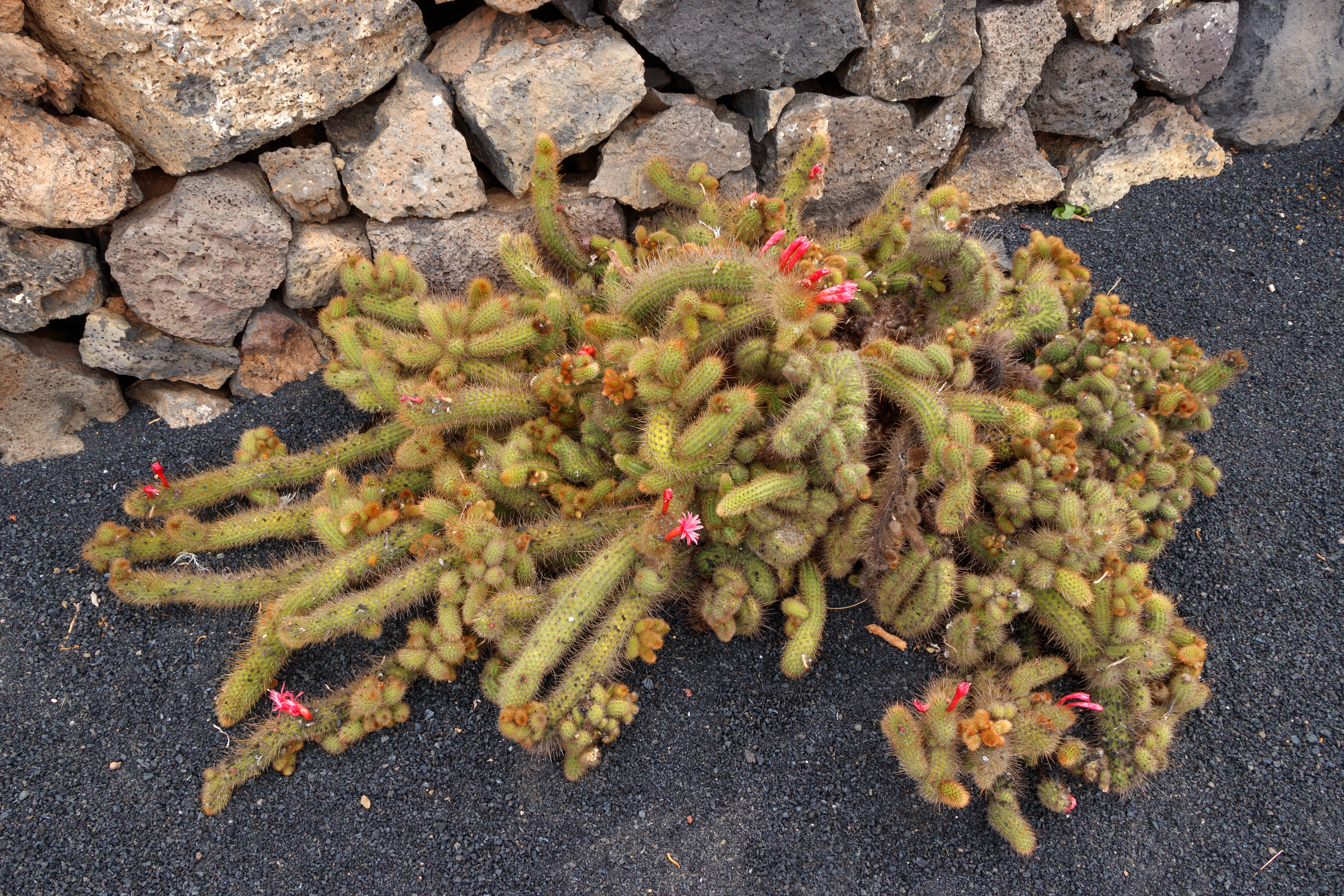
forma cristata

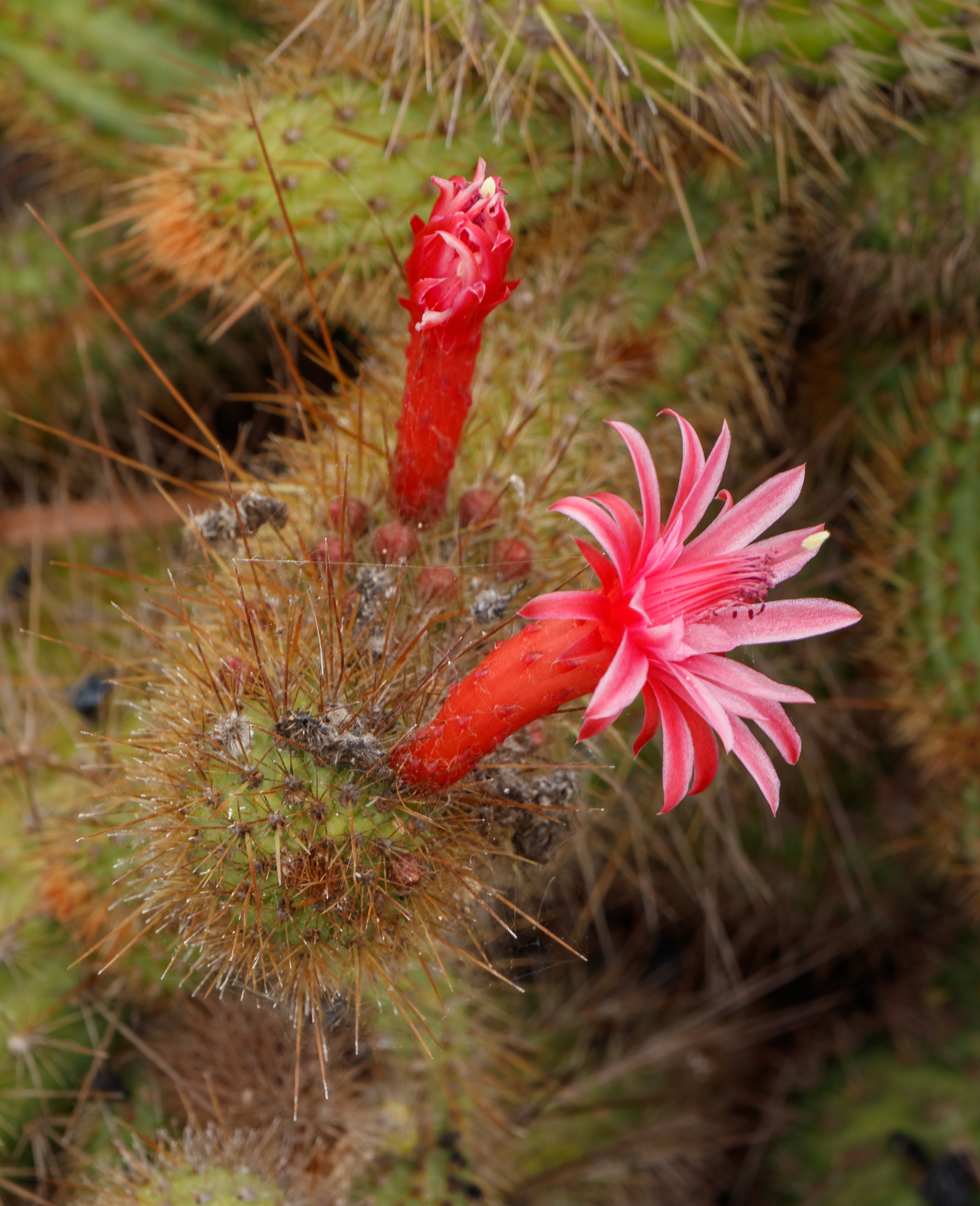
forma cristata

== Distribution ==
Cleistocactus samaipatanus is widespread in the rock outcrops in the lowlands of the Bolivian department of Santa Cruz in the province of Florida, Cordillera and Vallegrande and Luis Calvo province of Chuquisaca Department at altitudes of 1000 to 2000 meters.

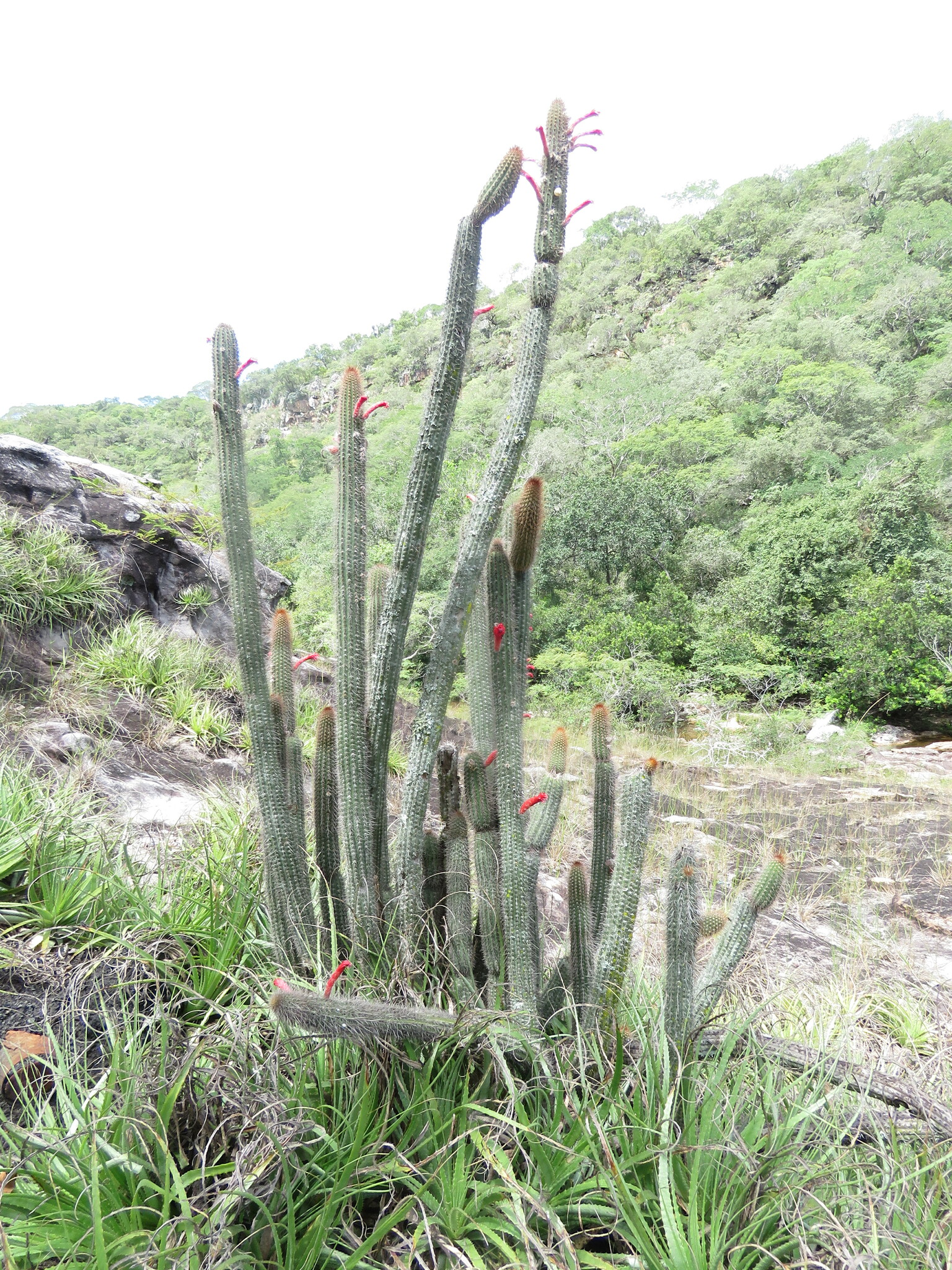
Habitat in Roboré, Bolivia

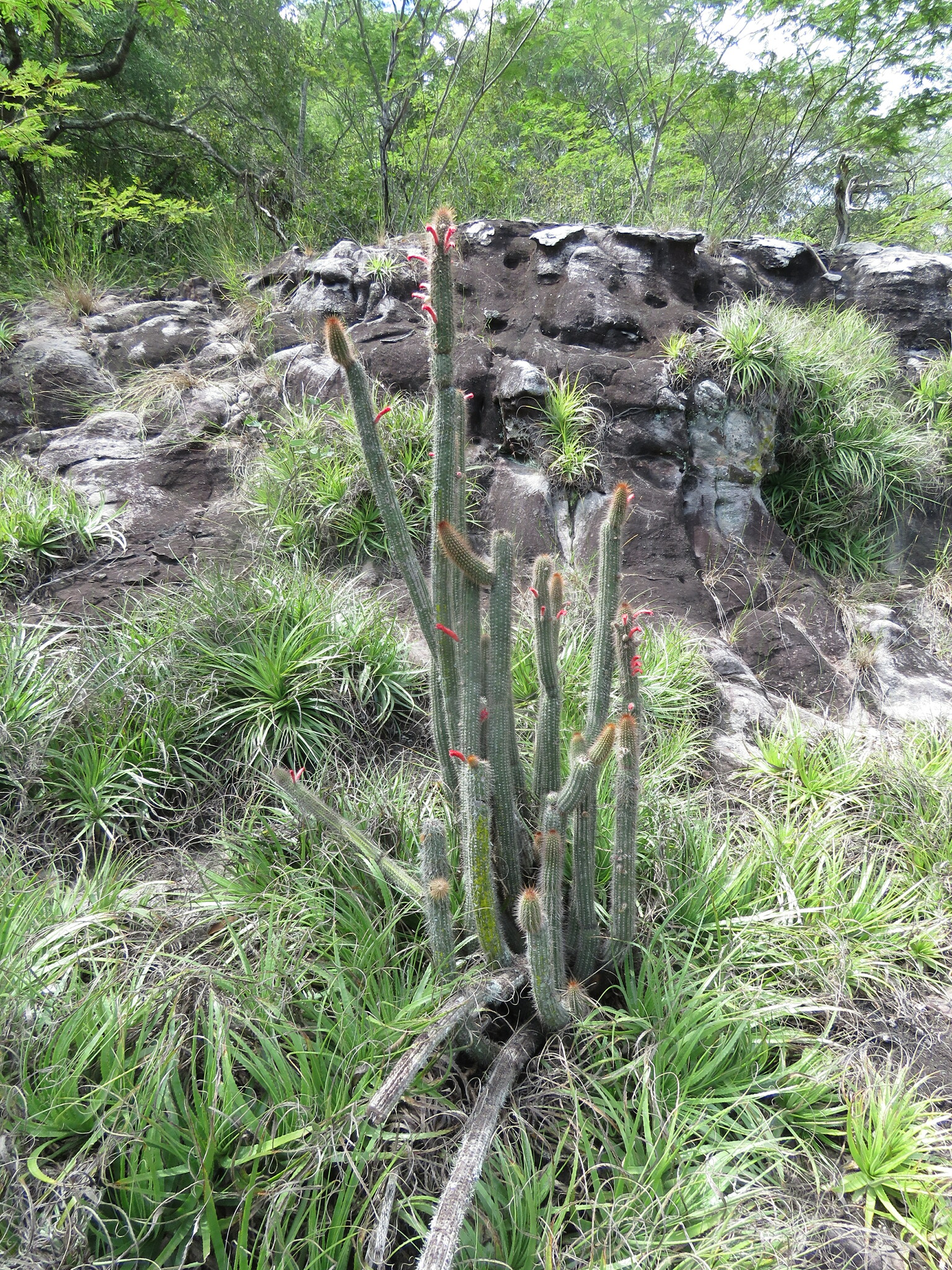
Habitat in Roboré, Bolivia

== Taxonomy ==
The first description of Bolivicereus samaipatanus was published in 1951 by Martín Cárdenas. David Richard Hunt placed the species in the genus Cleistocactus in 1987. Other nomenclature synonyms are Borzicactus samaipatanus (Cárdenas) Kimnach (1960) and Echinopsis samaipatana (Cárdenas) Anceschi & Magli (2013).

In the IUCN Red List of Threatened Species, the species is listed as "Least Concern (LC)".

== Culture ==
In cultivation in the UK, this plant has gained the Royal Horticultural Society's Award of Garden Merit (confirmed 2017). However, as it does not tolerate temperatures below 0 °C (32 °F), it must be grown under glass, though it may be placed outside during the warm summer months.
