= Ed Roush =

Ed Roush may refer to:

- Edd Roush (1893–1988), Major League Baseball player
- J. Edward Roush (1920–2004), U.S. Representative from Indiana
