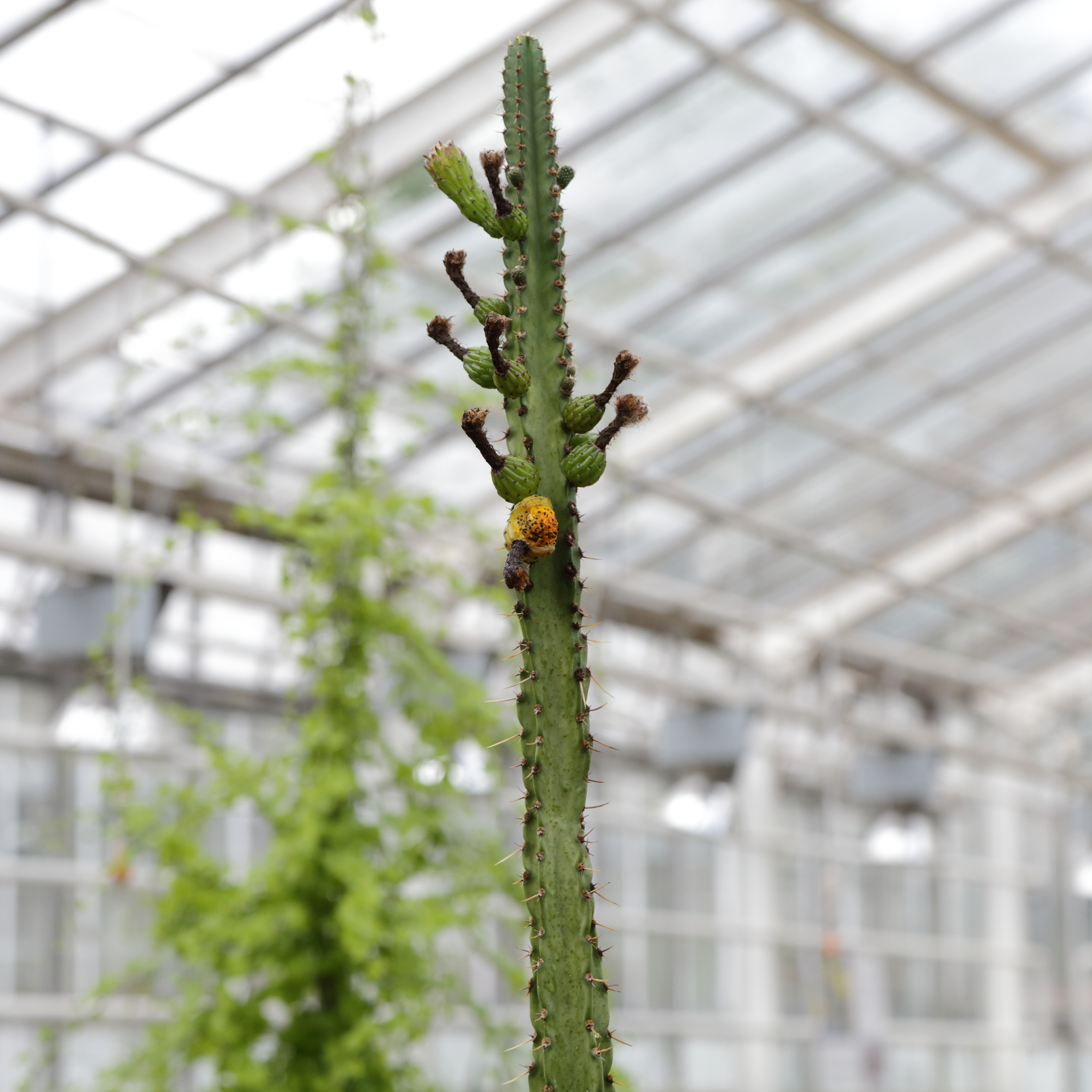

Conservation status
- Least Concern (IUCN 2.3)

Scientific classification
- Kingdom: Plantae
- Clade: Tracheophytes
- Clade: Angiosperms
- Clade: Eudicots
- Order: Caryophyllales
- Family: Cactaceae
- Subfamily: Cactoideae
- Genus: Samaipaticereus
- Species: S. corroanus

Binomial name
- Samaipaticereus corroanus Cárdenas

Synonyms
- Cleistocactus corroanus (Cárdenas) N.P.Taylor

= Samaipaticereus corroanus =

Species of cactus

Samaipaticereus corroanus is a species of cactus in the subtribe Trichocereinae, native to Bolivia and Peru. Along with Cleistocactus inquisivensis, Cleistocactus corroanus has been placed in the genus Samaipaticereus. A 2023 molecular phylogenetic study led to Cleistocactus being expanded to include Samaipaticereus, among other genera. The expansion is accepted by Plants of the World Online as of March 2025.

== Description ==
Samaipaticereus corroanus grows tree-like and columnar, is heavily branched and reaches heights of 2 to 4 meters. The green, long, upright shoots are not articulated and reach a diameter of up to 8 centimeters. Five spines usually arise from the areoles of the four to six ribs, which cannot be differentiated into central and radial spines. They are short and greyish white, one of them longer than the others and pointing downwards.

The numerous, constricted, funnel-shaped flowers are 4.5 to 5 centimeters long, open at night and remain open until the following day. The sepals are greenish white with brown tips, the petals are white. The pericarpel and the flower tube are covered with long scales, short hairs and some bristles.

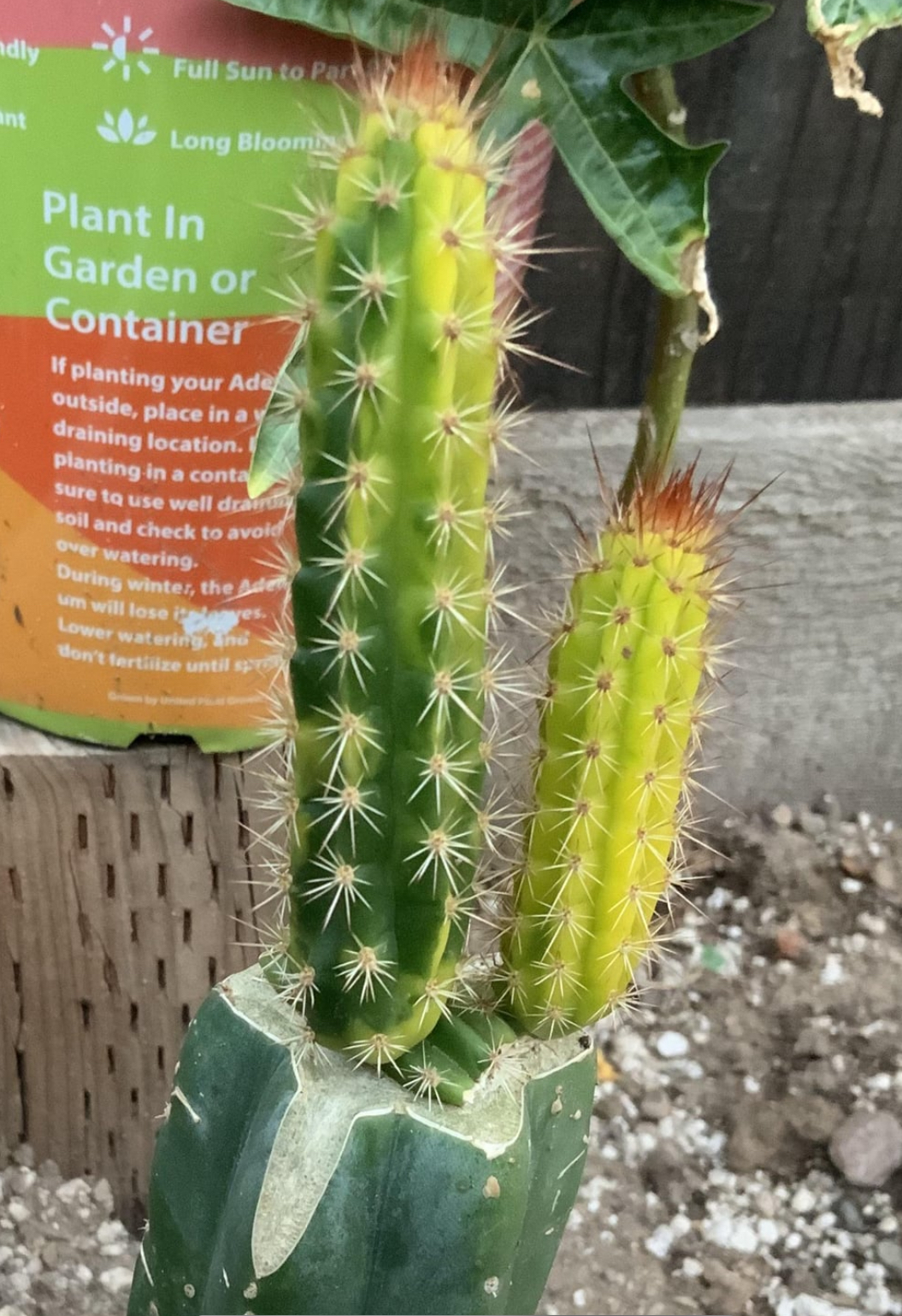
A grafted specimen displaying variegation

The spherical, truncated, tuberous fruits are more or less pink, have a perennial remnant of flowers and tear open lengthwise. The pulp is reddish-orange. The dark brown or blackish seeds are shiny, about 1.5 millimeters long and tiny dotted. The hilum is wide.

== Taxonomy ==
The first description by Martín Cárdenas was published in 1952. The genus name is derived from the town of Samaipata in Bolivia, near where the species was first collected. For the second species Samaipaticereus inquisivensis he described, the genus Yungasocereus was established by Friedrich Ritter in 1980.

== Distribution ==
Samaipaticereus corroanus is distributed in Peru (Cuzco) and eastern Bolivia.
