= Rausch =

Rausch is a German surname. Notable people with the name include:

- Barb Rausch (1941–2001), American comics artist and writer
- David A. Rausch, American writer and journalist
- Eberhard Rausch (born 1947), German skater
- Emil Rausch (1883–1954), German freestyle swimmer
- Franz Rausch (1792–1877), Austrian piano maker
- Friedel Rausch (1940–2017), German football player and manager
- James Steven Rausch (1928–1981), American Roman Catholic bishop
- Konstantin Rausch (born 1990), Russian footballer
- Leon Rausch (1927–2019), American singer
- Lotte Rausch (1913–1995), German actress
- Robert L. Rausch (1921–2012), American parasitologist, mammalogist, and veterinary physician
- Thomas Rausch, American theologian
- Tobias Rausch (born 1990), German politician
- Wolfgang Rausch (1947–2025), German footballer

== See also ==
- Rausch Creek (disambiguation)
- Roush, a surname
- Intoxication, a 1919 film with German-language title Rausch
