= Martín Cárdenas =

Martín Cárdenas may refer to:

- Martín Cárdenas (motorcyclist) (born 1982), Colombian motorcyclist
- Martín Cárdenas (botanist) (1899–1973), Bolivian botanist
