= Forest Harness =

American politician

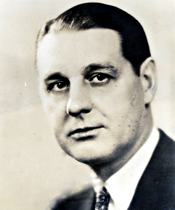

Member of the U.S. House of Representatives from Indiana's 5th district
- In office January 3, 1939 – January 3, 1949
- Preceded by: Glenn Griswold
- Succeeded by: John R. Walsh

Personal details
- Born: June 24, 1895 Kokomo, Indiana
- Died: July 29, 1974 (aged 79) Sarasota, Florida
- Resting place: Crown Point Cemetery
- Party: Republican

Forest Arthur Harness (June 24, 1895 – July 29, 1974) was an American lawyer, World War I veteran, and politician who served five terms as a U.S. representative from Indiana from 1939 to 1949.

== Biography ==
Born in Kokomo, Indiana, Harness attended public schools and graduated in 1917 from the law department of Georgetown University, Washington, D.C. where he was a member of the Delta Chi fraternity.

=== Military career ===
He served overseas during World War I as a first lieutenant, Three Hundred and Nineteenth Infantry from 1917 to 1919, for which he was awarded the Purple Heart. He served as captain in the Infantry Reserve, United States Army from 1920 to 1949.

=== Legal career ===
He was admitted to the District of Columbia bar in 1917, as well as to the Indiana bar in 1919, and commenced practice in Kokomo, Indiana. He was serving as prosecuting attorney of Howard County, Indiana from 1920 to 1924, and as special assistant to the Attorney General of the United States from 1931 to 1935, when he resigned to resume private practice.

== Congress ==
Harness was elected as a Republican to the Seventy-sixth and to the four succeeding Congresses (January 3, 1939 – January 3, 1949).

In September 1944, Harness claimed on the House floor that the Australian government warned Washington (prior to the attack on Pearl Harbor) that a Japanese aircraft carrier was bound for Hawaii and that this information was withheld from the commanders at Pearl Harbor. Rumors of this sort had been around for a while, but Harness's charges put them in the public record.

He served as chairman of the Select Committee on the Federal Communications Commission (Eightieth Congress). He was an unsuccessful candidate for reelection in 1948 to the Eighty-first Congress, at which point he resumed the practice of law.

== Later career and death ==
He served as Sergeant at Arms of the United States Senate from January 3, 1953, to January 3, 1955. He retired in 1960 and resided in Sarasota, Florida, where he died. He is entombed in the mausoleum at Crown Point Cemetery, Kokomo, Indiana.

U.S. House of Representatives
Preceded by Glenn Griswold	Member of the U.S. House of Representatives from Indiana's 5th congressional district 1939 - 1949	Succeeded by John R. Walsh
Political offices
Preceded by Joseph C. Duke	Sergeant at Arms of the United States Senate; 1953 - 1955	Succeeded by Joseph C. Duke
