= John R. Walsh =

American politician

John Richard Walsh
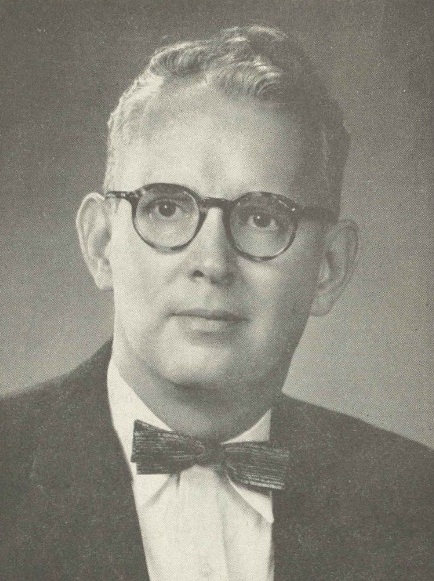
- Walsh in 1958

Member of the U.S. House of Representatives from Indiana's 5th district
- In office January 3, 1949 – January 3, 1951
- Preceded by: Forest Harness
- Succeeded by: John V. Beamer

49th Secretary of State of Indiana
- In office December 1, 1958 – November 30, 1960
- Governor: Harold W. Handley
- Preceded by: Frank A. Lennings
- Succeeded by: Charles O. Hendricks

Personal details
- Born: May 22, 1913 Martinsville, Indiana, U.S.
- Died: January 23, 1975 (aged 61) Anderson, Indiana, U.S.
- Resting place: Greenlawn Cemetery, Martinsville, Indiana, U.S.
- Party: Democratic
- Education: Indiana University

John Richard Walsh (May 22, 1913 – January 23, 1975) was an American lawyer and politician who served one term as a U.S. representative from Indiana from 1949 to 1951.

== Early life and career ==
Born in Martinsville, Indiana, Walsh attended the local public schools and graduated from Indiana University Law School in 1934. He was admitted to the bar July 27, 1934, and engaged in the practice of law in Martinsville, Indiana, until 1941. He served as Morgan County attorney in 1935 and 1936, and deputy attorney general for the state of Indiana in 1941.

He served in the United States Army with the Thirty-fifth Infantry Division from May 18, 1942, until discharged as a technical sergeant June 15, 1943.

He returned to Indiana in 1943 and continued the practice of law in Anderson, Indiana. He was chief deputy prosecuting attorney of Madison County, Indiana, in 1945 and 1946, and probate commissioner for Madison County Circuit Court in 1948.

== Congressional service ==
Walsh was elected as a Democrat to the Eighty-first Congress (January 3, 1949 – January 3, 1951). He was an unsuccessful candidate for reelection in 1950 and for election in 1954 to the Eighty-fourth Congress, after which he resumed the practice of law in Anderson.

== Post-Congressional career ==
Walsh served as member of the board of directors and as secretary-treasurer of the State Security Life Insurance Co. from 1953 to 1958. He served as Secretary of State of Indiana from December 1, 1958, to November 30, 1960. He served as delegate to the Democratic National Convention in 1960.

=== Death ===
He was county attorney of Madison County from 1964 to 1965 and remained a resident of Anderson, Indiana, until his death there on January 23, 1975. He was interred in Greenlawn Cemetery in his hometown of Martinsville.

U.S. House of Representatives
| Preceded by Forest Harness | Member of the U.S. House of Representatives from Indiana's 5th congressional district 1949-1951 | Succeeded by John V. Beamer |
Political offices
| Preceded by Frank A. Lennings | Secretary of State of Indiana; 1958–1960 | Succeeded by Charles O. Hendricks |
