= Pest, Hungary =

Part of Budapest, Hungary

Coordinates: 47°30′N 19°6′E

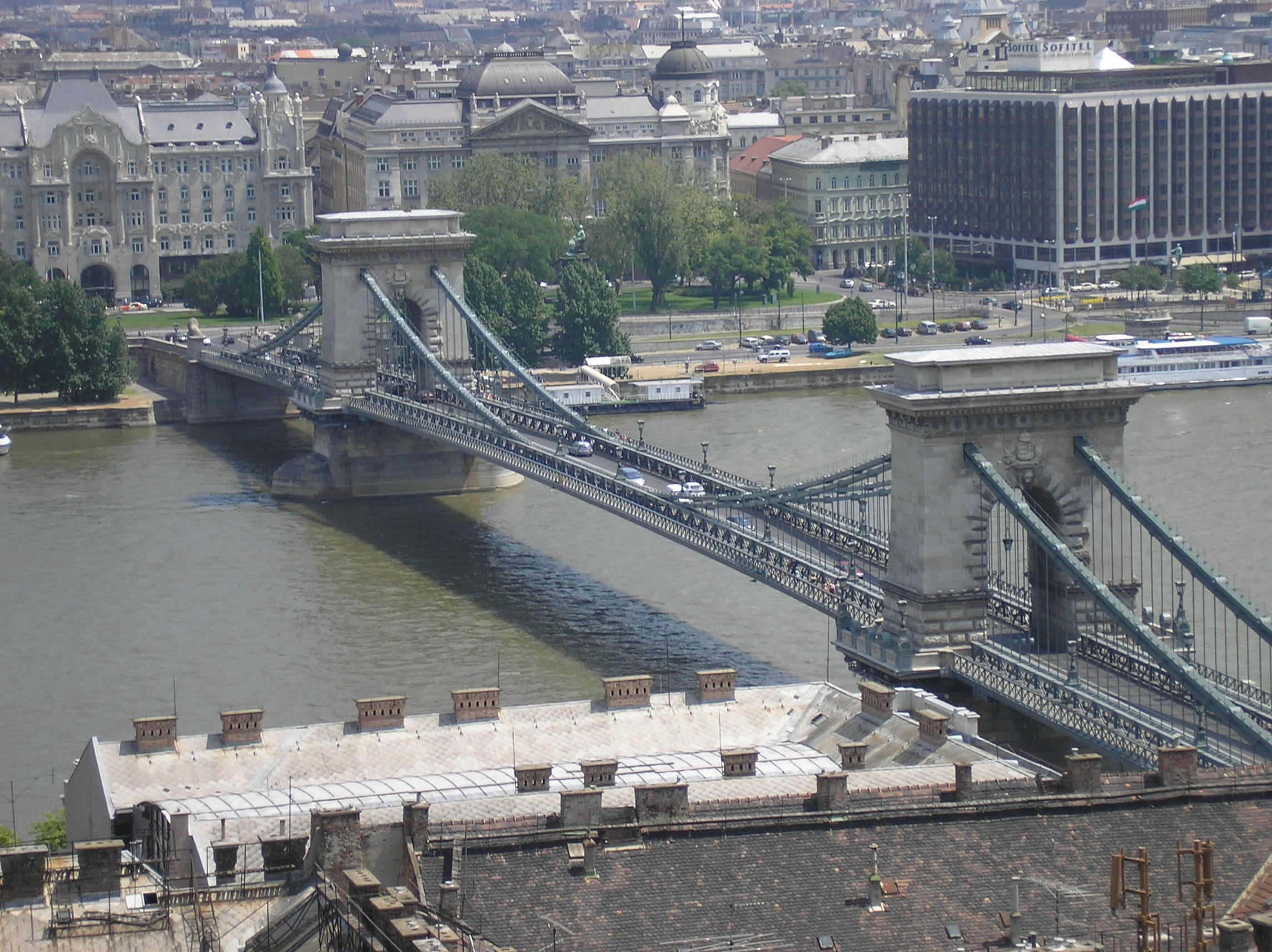
Buda and Pest connected by Széchenyi Chain Bridge

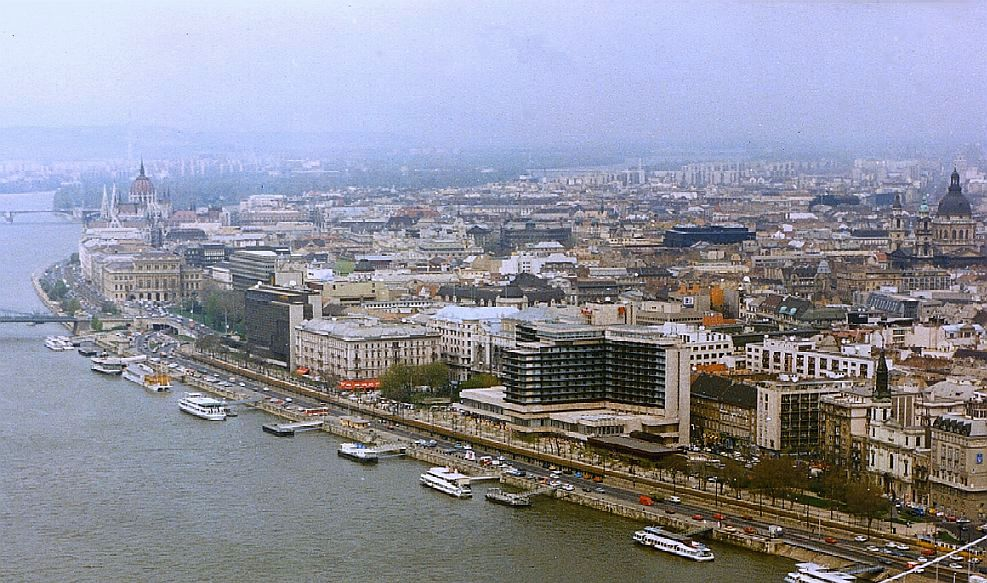
View of the riverfront of Pest

Pest (Hungarian pronunciation: [ˈpɛʃt]) is the part of Budapest, the capital city of Hungary, that lies on the eastern bank of the Danube. Pest was administratively unified with Buda and Óbuda in 1873. Prior to this, it was an independent city. In colloquial Hungarian, "Pest" is sometimes also used pars pro toto to refer to Budapest as a whole.

Comprising about two-thirds of the Budapest city area, Pest is flatter and much more heavily urbanized than Buda. Many of Budapest's most notable sites are in Pest, including the Inner City (Hungarian: Belváros), the Parliament (Országház), the Opera, the Great Market Hall, Heroes' Square, and Andrássy Avenue.

== Etymology ==
According to Ptolemy, the settlement was called Pession in antiquity, with the official Roman name being Contra-Aquincum (see Aquincum for the Roman town across the Danube in what became Óbuda). Alternatively, the name Pest may have come from a Slavic word meaning "furnace", "oven" (Bulgarian пещ [ˈpɛʃt]; Serbian пећ/peć; Croatian peć), related to the word пещера (peshtera, meaning "cave"), probably in reference to a local cave where fire burned. The spelling Pesth was occasionally used in English, even as late as the early 20th century, although it is now considered archaic.

== History ==
Flag of Pest before 1873

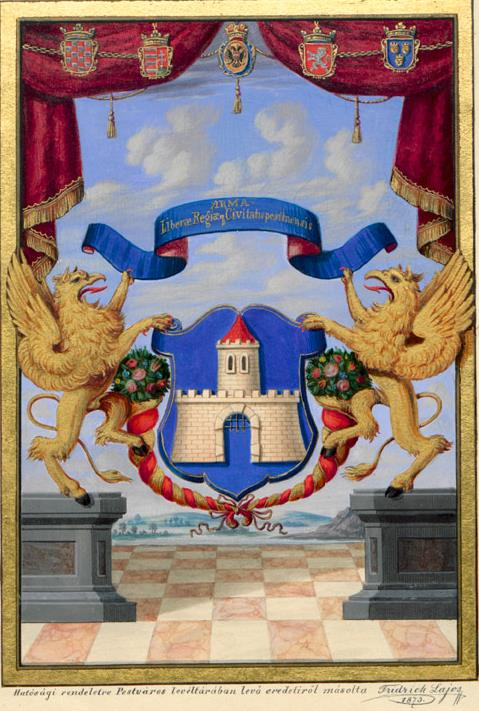
Historical coat of arms of Pest, used between 1703 and 1873

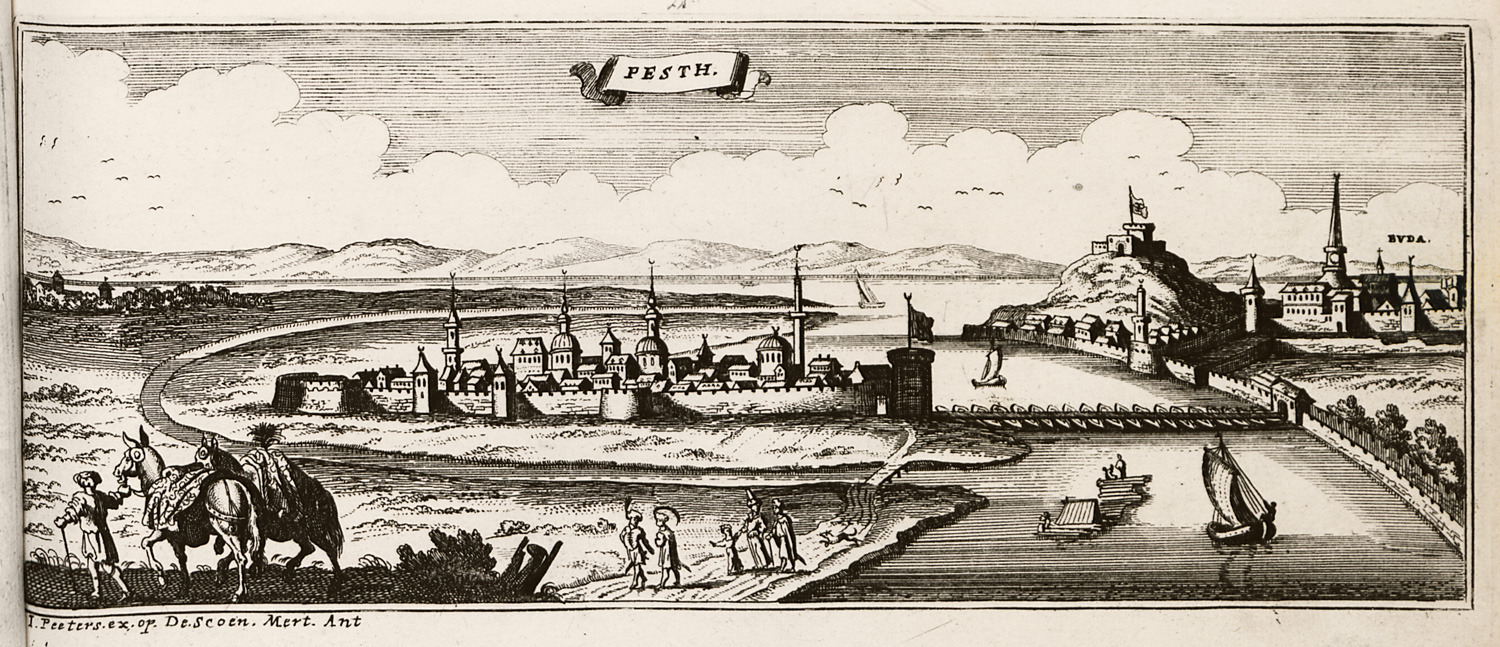
Buda and Pest view from 1686

Pest was originally founded as a Celtic settlement, then a fortified camp established by the Romans (Contra-Aquincum) across the river from their military border camp at Aquincum. Remains of the original Roman camp can still be seen at Március 15. tér.

During the Middle Ages, Pest was an independent city separate from Buda/Ofen, which became an important economic center during the 11th–13th centuries. The first written mention dates back to 1148.

Pest was destroyed in the 1241 Mongol invasion of Hungary, but was rebuilt shortly thereafter.

Demographically, in the 15th century Pest was mostly Hungarian, while Buda across the Danube had a German-majority population.

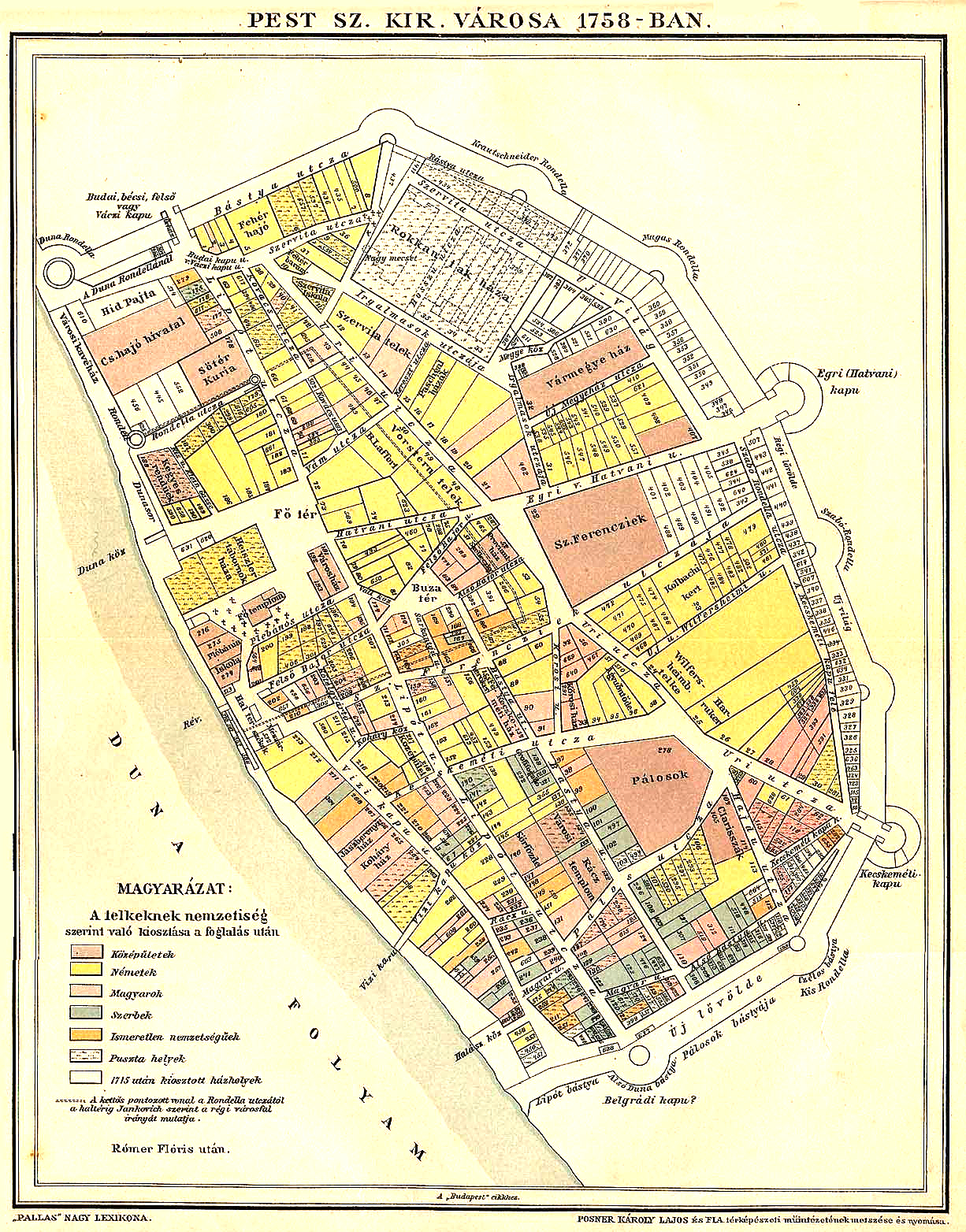
A map of Pest in 1758, published in 1830. Outside the city wall ran a country road, mirrored by today's Kiskörút completed in 1880, which forms a circular arc between Deák Ferenc tér and Fővám tér.

In 1838 Pest was flooded by the Danube; parts of the city were under as much as eight feet of water, and the flood destroyed or seriously damaged three-fourths of the city's buildings. In 1849 the first suspension bridge, the Széchenyi Chain Bridge, was constructed across the Danube connecting Pest with Buda. Subsequently, in 1873, the two cities were unified with Óbuda to become Budapest.

== Notable people ==
- László Teleki (1811–1861), writer, statesman and magician
- Henrik Weber (1818–1866), painter
- Theodor Herzl (1860–1904), founder of the political Zionist movement
- Harry Houdini (1874–1926), illusionist and escape acts performer
- Franz Rausch (1792-1877), piano maker

== See also ==
- Budapest
- Inner City (Budapest)
- Pest County
- Újpest (New Pest)
- Kispest (Little Pest)
- Pestszentlőrinc (Saint Lawrence of Pest)
- Buda
- Óbuda (Old Buda)
