= John V. Beamer =

American politician (1896–1964)

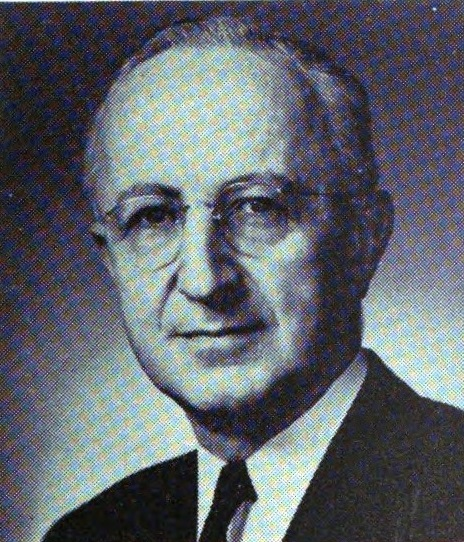
- John V. Beamer, Indiana Congressman

Member of the U.S. House of Representatives from Indiana's 5th district
- In office January 3, 1951 – January 3, 1959
- Preceded by: John R. Walsh
- Succeeded by: J. Edward Roush

Personal details
- Born: John Valentine Beamer; November 17, 1896 Wabash County, Indiana, U.S.
- Died: September 8, 1964 (aged 67) Anderson, Indiana, U.S.
- Resting place: Falls Cemetery, Wabash, Indiana, U.S.
- Party: Republican

Military service
- Branch/service: United States Army
- Rank: Private First Class
- Unit: Field artillery

John Valentine Beamer (November 17, 1896 – September 8, 1964) was an American businessman and veteran of World War I who served four terms as a U.S. representative from Indiana from 1951 to 1959.

== Background ==
Born on a farm in Wabash County, Indiana, Beamer's father and maternal grandparents were German immigrants. He attended the public schools of Roann, Indiana and graduated from Roann High School in 1914. He graduated from Wabash College in Crawfordsville, Indiana in 1918.

=== World War I ===
During World War I era, he served as a private first class in the field artillery.

=== Business career ===
He was employed with Service Motor Truck Co., Wabash, Indiana from 1919 to 1921. He was a representative for the Century Company, a school textbook publisher, in New York and Chicago from 1921 to 1928. He later became vice president and general manager of the Wabash Baking Powder Chemical Company from 1928 to 1941. He served as vice president and sales manager, Union Rock Wool Corp. of Wabash, Indiana from 1935 to 1942.

== Political career ==
He served in the State house of representatives in 1949 and 1950.

Beamer was elected as a Republican to the Eighty-second and to the three succeeding Congresses (January 3, 1951 – January 3, 1959). Beamer did not vote on the Civil Rights Act of 1957. He was an unsuccessful candidate for reelection in 1958 to the Eighty-sixth Congress.

His name was given to the Beamer Resolution enacted on August 20, 1958, which automatically gave states permission to form compacts in the areas of traffic safety under the Driver License Compact.

He served as member of the National Selective Service Appeal Board from March 1960 until his resignation on September 1, 1961.

== Death and burial ==
He died in Anderson, Indiana, September 8, 1964, aged 67 and was interred in Falls Cemetery, Wabash, Indiana.

U.S. House of Representatives
Preceded by John R. Walsh	Member of the U.S. House of Representatives from Indiana's 5th congressional district 1951–1959	Succeeded by J. Edward Roush
