= Instituto Normal Superior =

Institute in La Paz, Bolivia

The Instituto Normal Superior Adventista (INSA) is an institute in La Paz, Bolivia. It is part of the Universidad Adventista de Bolivia (UAB). The university was established on June 28, 1956, authorized by the Bolivian Ministry of Education.

It has 1513 professors; many of them work in different cities in the country. There is a branch of the university in Cochabamba. The 2006 examination of studies at the institute revealed that there are 1137 students studying at the institute.

== Notable alumni ==
- Martín Cárdenas (1899–1973) – botanist
