= Horáček =

Horáček (feminine Horáčková) is a Czech surname. Notable people with the surname include:

== Horáček ==
- Jan Horáček (born 1979), Czech professional ice hockey player
- Judy Horacek (born 1961), Australian cartoonist, illustrator and writer
- Michal Horáček (born 1952), Czech entrepreneur, producer
- Michal Horáček (orienteer) (born 1977), Czech orienteering competitor
- Mike Horacek (born 1973), American football wide receiver
- Milan Horáček (born 1946), German politician, a founding member of the German Green Party, and a former MEP
- Petr Horáček (born 1974), Czech boxer
- Tony Horacek (born 1967), retired Canadian professional ice hockey left winger
- Tamara Horacek (born 1995), French handballer

== Horáčková ==
- Barbora Horáčková (1969–2018), Czech archer
- Marie Horáčková (born 1997), Czech archer

== See also ==
- Horák
