= J. Edward Roush Lake =

Reservoir in Huntington County, Indiana, U.S.

- Huntington Lake
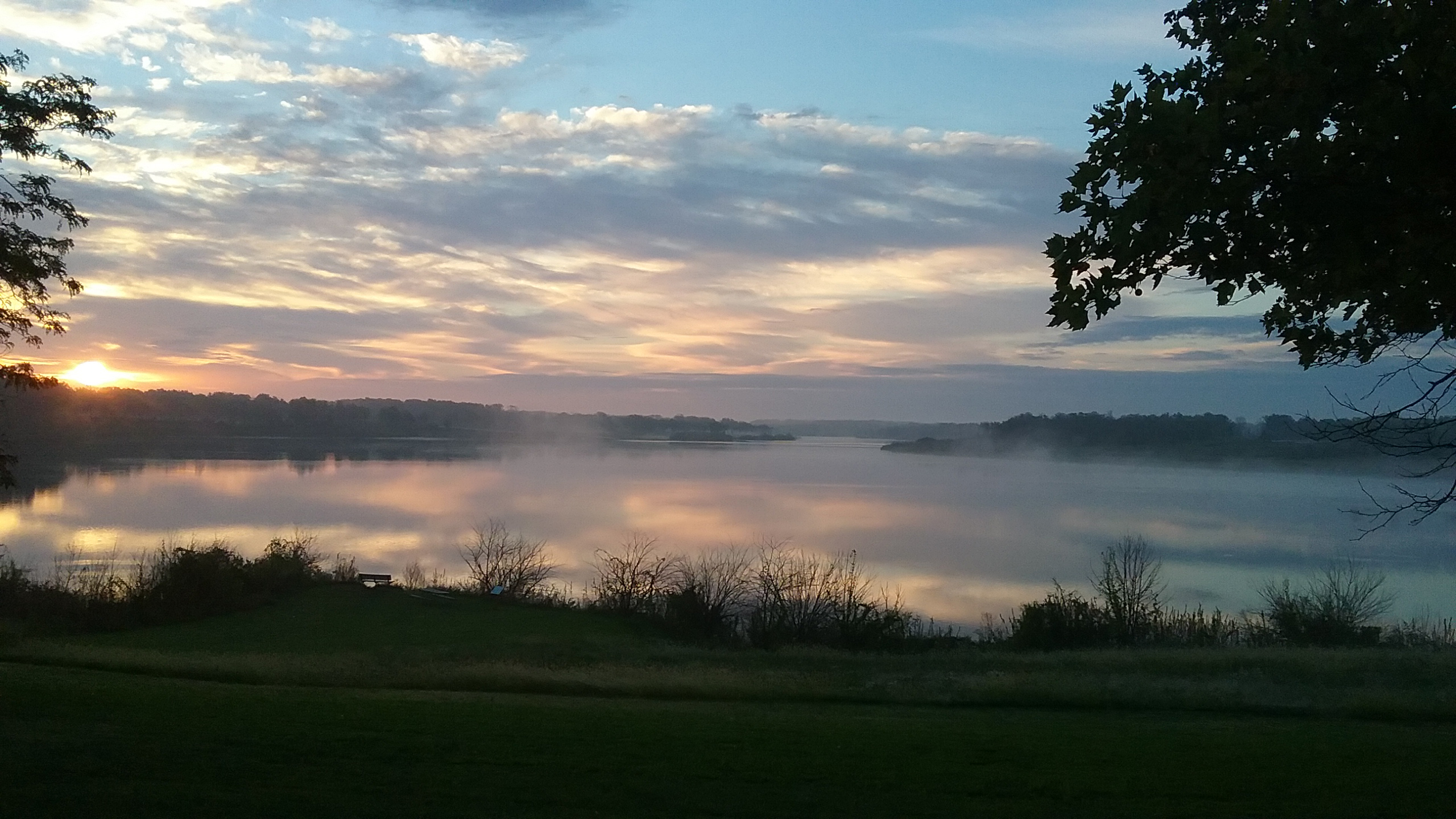

- Location within Indiana Location within the United States
- Location: Huntington, Indiana
- Coordinates: 40°50′47″N 85°28′06″W
- Type: reservoir
- Primary inflows: Wabash River
- Primary outflows: Wabash River
- Surface elevation: 748 feet (228 m)

J. Edward Roush Lake is a reservoir in Huntington, Indiana, United States. The lake is found at an elevation of 748 feet (228 m).

The Huntington Reservoir was renamed J. Edward Roush Lake to honor the impact to the local area of J. Edward Roush, who served as a State Representative and State Senator in Indiana and a representative in the U.S. House of Representatives.

The J. Edward Roush Lake Dam was completed in 1968 for flood control and recreation. At 91 feet (28 m) high and 6,500 feet (2,000 m) in length at its crest, its maximum capacity is 153,100 acre-feet (0.1888 km^{3}) and normal capacity is 12,500 acre-feet (0.0154 km^{3}).

The Indiana Department of Natural Resources (DNR), in partnership with the United States Army Corps of Engineers, manages public land at Roush Lake, along with that of seven other lakes in the state, including nearby Salamonie and Mississinewa lakes. The latter two, along with Roush, are known as the Upper Wabash Reservoirs. Under a lease with the Corps, the DNR operates and maintains the recreational facilities and wildlife areas at these properties. The Corps manages the dams and some recreational facilities immediately around the dams. The Corps also monitors and controls lake water levels.

Activities allowed at the lake include boating, camping, fishing, hunting, picnicking, and water sports.

== See also ==
- J.E. Roush Fish and Wildlife Area
