= Franz Rausch =

Austrian piano maker (1792–1877)

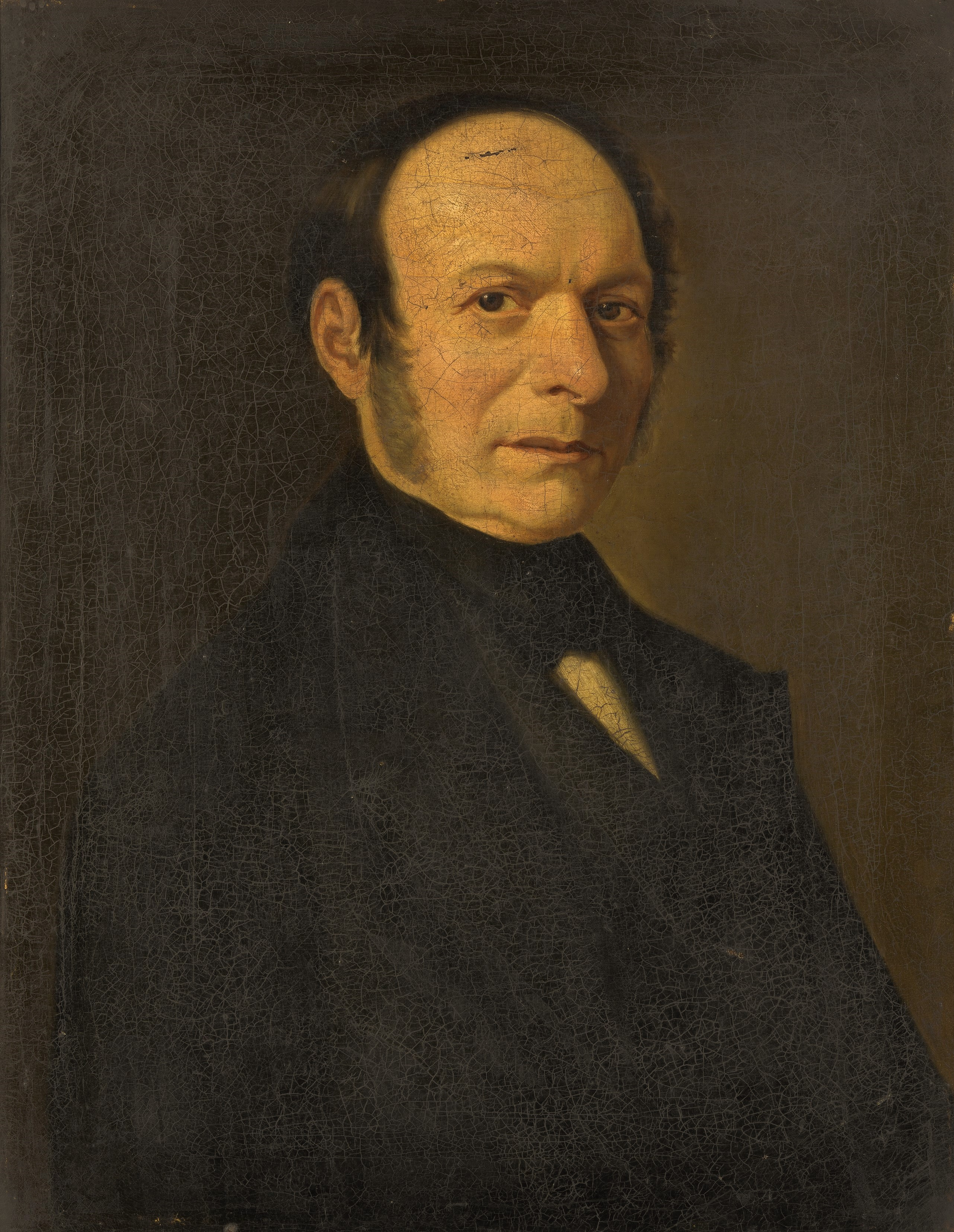
Franz Rausch around 1850, painting by Carl Haunold

Franz Rausch (1792 in Pest – 17 February 1877 in Vienna) was an Austrian piano maker of the 19th century.

== Biography ==
Rausch was the son of Lorenz Rausch and Magdalena, née Flandorfer. His father originally came from Weitra in the Waldviertel in Lower Austria and had emigrated to Pest as a weaver. In the piano manufactory of the renowned Viennese piano maker Conrad Graf, Rausch learned the craft of piano maker from 1819 onwards. At that time, Graf's factory was considered the "largest and most renowned in Vienna and the Empire". Pianos were mass-produced in working groups and from 1821, Rausch was largely foreman or plant manager. He made several instruments in his workshop in Wiedner Hauptstraße in Vienna.

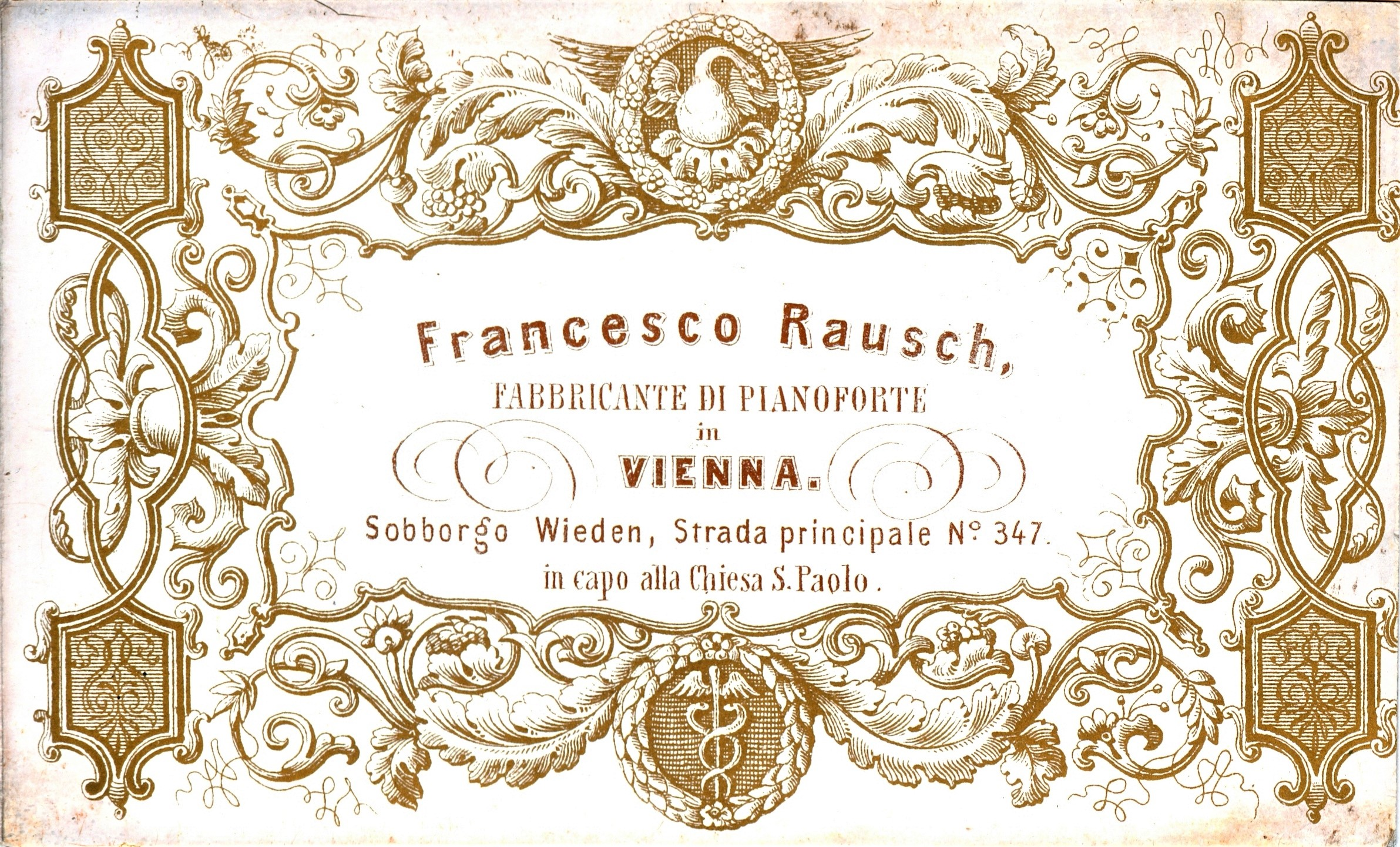
Business card from Franz Rausch, Italian version, 1847–1851

His fortepianos were awarded the gold medal in 1839 at the 2nd Austrian General Industrial Product Exhibition for being "most perfect among the many excellent instruments in the exhibition". At the first General German Industrial Exhibition in Munich in 1854, Franz Rausch & Sohn also exhibited "grand piano fortepianos of various constructions" and awarded a medal of honour ("for the production of an excellently executed grand piano-shaped piano of the same good tone").

Twelve children are documented from his marriage to Katharina Wallner (1808–1883) which took place on 20 November 1825 in Schottenfeld near Vienna. The first-born son Franz Georg Rausch Jr. (born 1827) also became a piano maker, patented two improvements for piano construction in 1854, but had to file for bankruptcy in 1865; son Conrad Georg Rausch (born 1833) was an authorized signatory of the Wiener Bankgesellschaft.

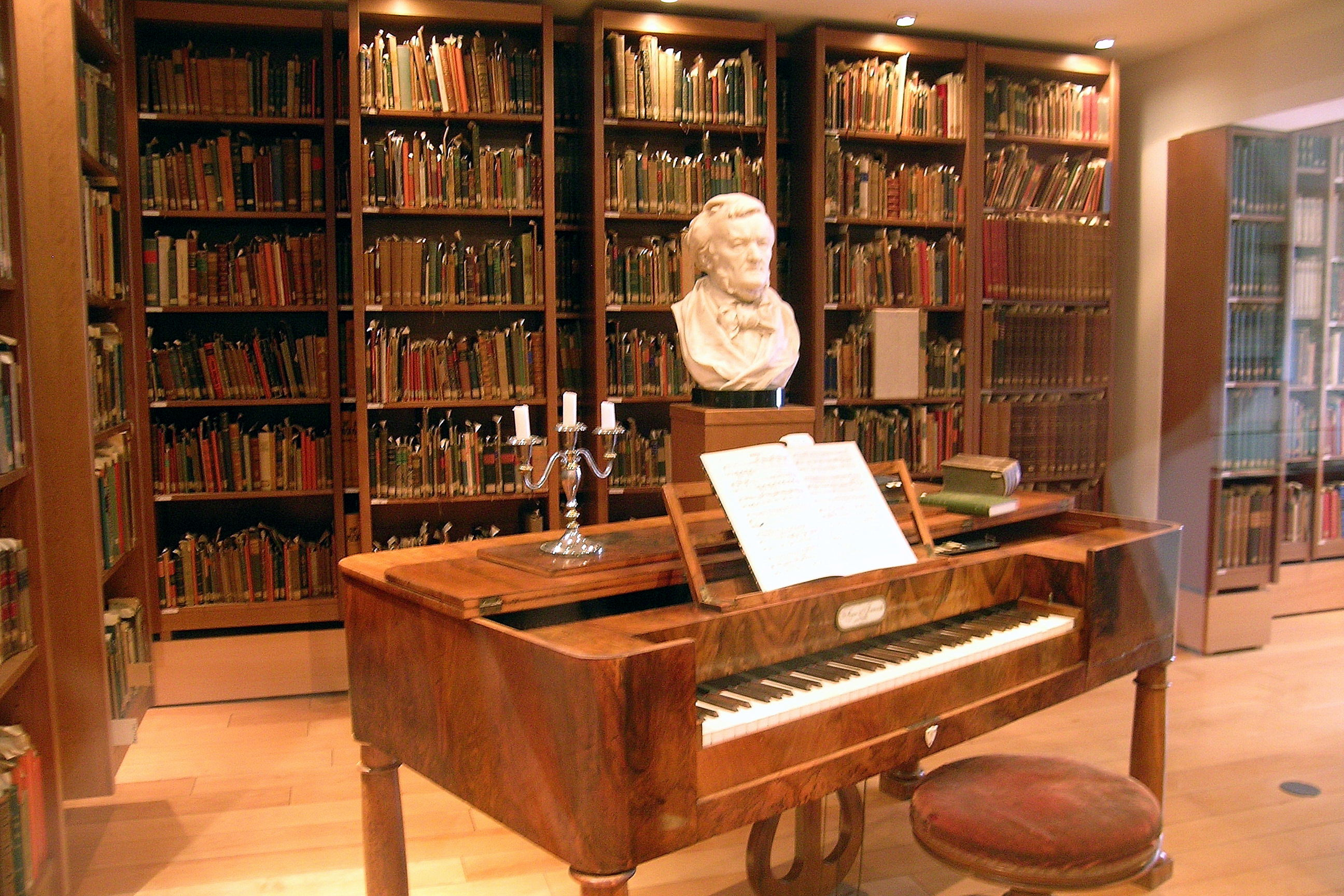
Square piano by Franz Rausch in the Reuter-Wagner Museum in Eisenach, Germany

From 1827 onwards, Rausch's homes and workplaces in the then Viennese suburb of Wieden around Wiedner Hauptstraße are documented. From 1856 till 1865 he lived in Margareten Castle in Vienna.

== Rausch's instruments (selection) ==
Relatively few instruments by Franz Rausch Sr. have survived, about as many fortepianos as square pianos. All instruments were built in the design of the Viennese mechanics.

Currently (as of 2024), his instruments are used by numerous pianists in the sense of playing on authentic instruments in accordance with historical performance practice, including pianists like Jörg Demus, Marco Cadario and Eric Zivian.

Rausch exported numerous instruments. For example, to the music teacher and piano dealer Friedrich Wieck (Clara Schumann's father), in Leipzig and Halle, as well as to the Milanese dealer Joseph Prestinari in today's Italy and Slovenia in the Trieste, Milan and Ljubljana area. Below are some examples of instruments:

- Square piano from the possession of the Thomaskantor Christian Theodor Weinlig, on which Richard Wagner received piano lessons in Leipzig in 1831/1832 (Reuter-Wagner-Museum)
- Square piano owned by the Italian composer Luigi Ricci
- Fortepiano from 1825 in the possession of the Italian pianist Marco Cadario
- Fortepiano from 1841 owned by the Canadian pianist Eric Zivian

== Recordings on instruments by Franz Rausch (selection) ==
- Franz Schubert: "The Shepherd on the Rock". In: LP Schubertiade with Elly Ameling, soprano; Hans Deinzer, clarinet; Jörg Demus, fortepiano; Harmonia Mundi 20 29315-7, recorded in the Cedar Hall, Kirchheim Castle (1965) on a fortepiano by Franz Rausch (1835)
- Robert Schumann: Waldszenen, "Eintritt", Op. 82, No. 1, recorded by Jörg Demus (1968) on a fortepiano by Rausch (1839)
- Recordings on a fortepiano by Franz Rausch (1841)
1. Franz Schubert: Trio Op. 100 – Andante con moto. Freivogel, Tomkins & Zivian 4K UHD, D. 929 (2017)
2. Robert Schumann: Dichterliebe, Op. 48, voice: Kyle Stegall, fortepiano: Eric Zivian (2023)
3. Frédéric Chopin: Préludes Op. 28, No. 20 in C minor, fortepiano: Eric Zivian (2024)
4. Frédéric Chopin: Waltz in A minor, Op. 34, No. 2 "Valse Brillante". Fortepiano: Audrey Vardanega (2023)
- Johann Ladislaus Dussek: "Tableau de la situation de Marie Antoinette Reine de France depuis son emprisonement jusqu au dernier moment de sa vie". Recording by Marco Cadario in 2007 on a fortepiano by Franz Rausch (1825)
