= Ruche =

Ruche may refer to:

- Ruching, in garment design, ruffling or pleating in fabric for decoration or embellishment
- Ruché, a grape
