= Chris Roush =

American author and college journalism professor

- Education: Auburn University (BA); University of Florida (MA)
- Occupations: Journalism professor, author
- Employer(s): University of North Carolina at Chapel Hill; Quinnipiac University
- Known for: Business journalism
- Notable work: Show Me the Money; The Future of Business Journalism
- Awards: Charles E. Scripps Award for Journalism Education (2009)

Christopher S. Roush is an American journalist, author, and academic. He has worked as a business journalist and editor for publications including BusinessWeek, The Atlanta Journal-Constitution, Bloomberg News, and SNL Financial, and has held academic and administrative positions at the University of North Carolina at Chapel Hill and Quinnipiac University.

Roush was dean of the School of Communications at Quinnipiac University from 2019 to 2023 and previously spent 17 years at the University of North Carolina at Chapel Hill, where he established a business journalism program and was a professor, director of the master's program, and senior associate dean.

Roush has received the Charles E. Scripps Award for Journalism Teacher of the Year and the Carnegie Foundation for the Advancement of Teaching and Council for Advancement and Support of Education's North Carolina Professor of the Year award.

== Early life and education ==
Roush was born in Opelika, Alabama and attended high school in suburban Atlanta. He graduated from Auburn University in 1987 and received his master's degree from the University of Florida in 1990. His father was historian Gerald Roush.

== Career ==
Roush worked for the St. Petersburg Times, the Sarasota Herald-Tribune, the Tampa Tribune, BusinessWeek, the Atlanta Journal-Constitution, and Bloomberg News. His work concentrated on business and financial reporting.

In 1999, Roush published Inside Home Depot: How One Company Revolutionized an Industry Through the Relentless Pursuit of Growth, a history of The Home Depot based on his reporting as a business journalist. The book examined the company's development and the business strategies of its founders, Bernard Marcus and Arthur Blank.

=== Academic career ===
He taught business journalism at Washington & Lee University in 2001-01 and the University of Richmond in 2001-02.

At UNC-Chapel Hill, he was the Walter E. Hussman, Sr. Distinguished Professor in business journalism at University of North Carolina. While he was senior associate dean of the School of Media and Journalism from 2011 to 2015 and director of the master's program from 2007 to 2010.

In 2019, Roush was appointed dean of the School of Communications at Quinnipiac University, succeeding the school's previous dean. He joined Quinnipiac after 17 years at UNC Chapel Hill.

Roush stepped down as dean in 2023 after four years in the position.

Roush joined Elon University in 2024 as assistant vice president of strategic partnerships.

In 2025, Roush was featured in the History Channel series The Mega Brands That Built America in connection with an episode examining the development of The Home Depot and Lowe's.

== Awards and honors ==
He won the 2009 Charles E. Scripps Award for Journalism Education, a national teacher of the year honor given by the Scripps Howard Foundation in collaboration with the Association for Education in Journalism and Mass Communication.

He is the author of "The Future of Business Journalism: Why it Matters for Wall Street and Main Street." He has written ten books, most recently The Future of Business Journalism: Why It Matters for Wall Street and Main Street. He is the founder of Talking Biz News, a news website about business journalists. Roush also wrote books on the history of Hickory-based Alex Lee food business; Progress Energy; and a biography of famed Wall Street Journal editor Vermont Royster.

He also oversaw the publication of “Master Class: Teaching Advice for Journalism and Mass Communication Instructors,” a book produced by the Association for Education in Journalism and Mass Communication standing committee on teaching.

== Selected works ==
- Inside Home Depot: How One Company Revolutionized an Industry Through the Relentless Pursuit of Growth (1999)
- Show Me the Money: Writing Business and Economics Stories for Mass Communication (2004)
- Profits and Losses: Business Journalism and Its Role in Society (2006; revised edition 2011)
- Thinking Things Over: Vermont Royster's Legacy at The Wall Street Journal (2014)
- The Future of Business Journalism: Why It Matters for Wall Street and Main Street (2022)
- Building Commerce: Strength, Community, Innovation for 150 Years (2015)
