= Rausch Creek =

Rausch Creek may refer to:

- Rausch Creek, Pennsylvania, a populated place in Schuylkill County, Pennsylvania
- Rausch Creek (Pine Creek), in Schuylkill County, Pennsylvania
- Stony Creek (Susquehanna River), also referred to as Rausch Creek, in Dauphin County, Pennsylvania
  - Rausch Creek (Stony Creek), a tributary of the above
