= J.E. Roush Fish and Wildlife Area =

- IUCN category IV (habitat/species management area)
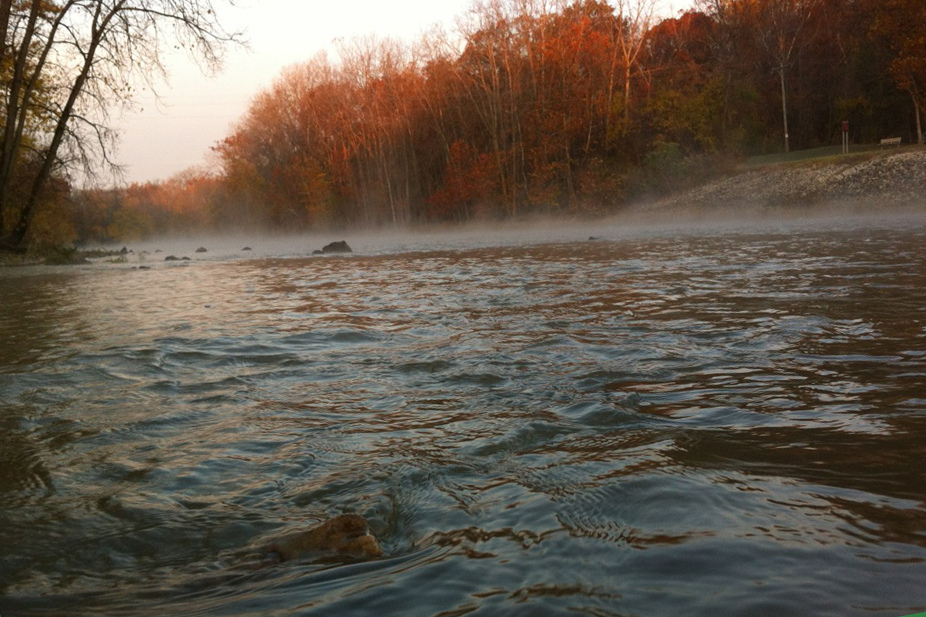
- Fall at J.E. Roush Lake

- Location within Indiana
- Location: Huntington and Wells counties, Indiana, United States
- Nearest city: Huntington, IN
- Coordinates: 40.827633°N 85.353883°W
- Area: 8,217 acres (33.3 km^{2})
- Established: 1956
- Governing body: Indiana Department of Natural Resources
- Website: www.in.gov/dnr/fishwild/6358.htm

J.E. Roush Fish and Wildlife Area is an area dedicated to providing hunting and fishing opportunities while maintaining 8,217 acres (3,325 ha), 870 acres (350 ha) of which are water of J.E. Roush Lake. It is located along U.S. Route 224 east of Huntington, Indiana. Water levels of the flood control reservoir are maintained by the U.S. Army Corps of Engineers.

== Hunting ==
Hunting opportunities include hunting for deer, small game, waterfowl, and turkey.

== Facilities ==
- Wildlife Viewing
- Ice Fishing
- Hunting
- Trapping
- Shooting Range
- Archery Range
- Dog Training Area
- Boat Ramp (Motors permitted)
- Dump Station
- Camping
  - 25 full hook-up
  - 20 primitive sites
