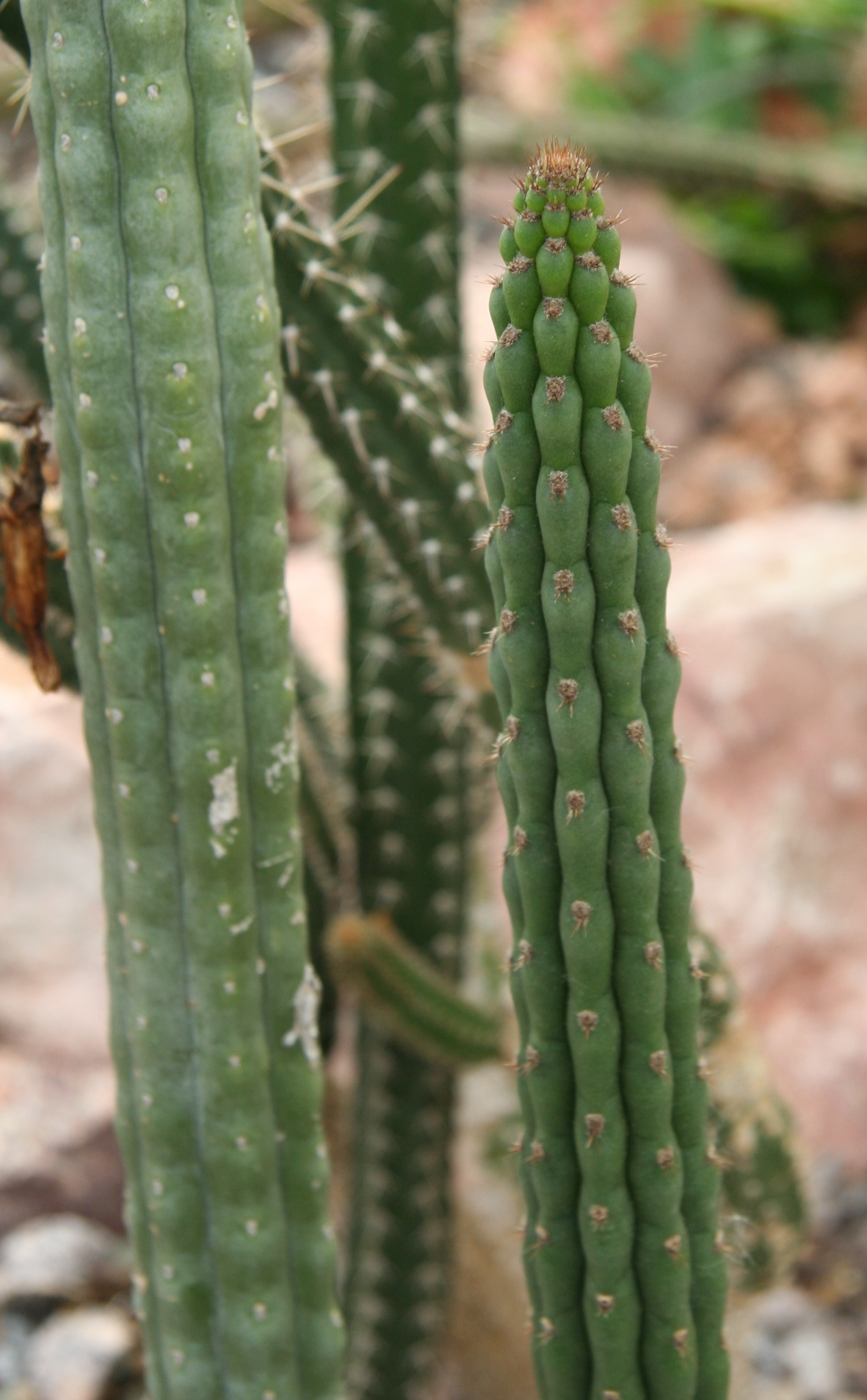

Conservation status
- Least Concern (IUCN 3.1)

Scientific classification
- Kingdom: Plantae
- Clade: Tracheophytes
- Clade: Angiosperms
- Clade: Eudicots
- Order: Caryophyllales
- Family: Cactaceae
- Subfamily: Cactoideae
- Tribe: Cereeae
- Subtribe: Trichocereinae
- Genus: Yungasocereus; F.Ritter
- Species: Y. inquisivensis

Binomial name
- Yungasocereus inquisivensis (Cárdenas) F.Ritter ex Eggli

Synonyms
- Samaipaticereus inquisivensis Cárdenas; Cleistocactus inquisivensis (Cárdenas) N.P.Taylor

= Yungasocereus =

Genus of cacti

Yungasocereus is a monotypic genus of cactus containing one species, Yungasocereus inquisivensis.

== Description ==
Yungasocereus inquisivensis is a columnar cactus, appearing either as a tree or shrub, ranging up to 4–5 meters in height. The 6–7 cm (2.4–2.8 in) diameter stems are dark green, with 6-10 ribs. The 1.5–3 cm (0.59–1.18 in) spines are in groups of 4-12, with no differentiation into central and radial types, and range from a brownish to grayish color. The flowers are white, appearing in groups of 5-8 near the stem tips. They open day and night and are 5 to 6 cm (2.0 to 2.4 in) long.

The fruits have a length between 2 and 2.8 cm (0.79 and 1.10 in). They contain small, broadly oval, shiny black, slightly keeled seeds on the back, 0.9 mm (0.035 in) long and 0.7 mm (0.028 in) wide.

== Taxonomy ==
Martín Cárdenas described the species in 1957 from Inquisivi, placing it in Samaipaticereus. Friedrich Ritter later found the same species in Yungas. In 1980, he gave the cactus its own genus, Yungasocereus. After a period in Haageocereus, the species was again separated into Yungasocereus. A 2023 molecular phylogenetic study led to Cleistocactus being expanded to include Yungasocereus and Samaipaticereus. The expansion is not accepted by Plants of the World Online as of October 2025, with this species accepted as Yungasocactus inquisivensis.

== Distribution ==
Yungasocereus inquisivensis is known only from Yungas and Inquisivi provinces of La Paz Department, where it is found at elevations of around 1000 to 2300 meters.
