= J. Edward Roush =

American politician (1920–2004)

John Edward Roush
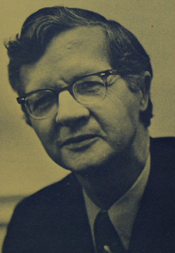

Member of the U.S. House of Representatives from Indiana
- In office January 3, 1971 – January 3, 1977
- Preceded by: E. Ross Adair
- Succeeded by: Dan Quayle
- Constituency: 4th District
- In office January 3, 1959 – January 3, 1969
- Preceded by: John V. Beamer
- Succeeded by: E. Ross Adair (Redistricting)
- Constituency: 5th District

Personal details
- Born: September 12, 1920 Barnsdall, Oklahoma, U.S.
- Died: March 26, 2004 (aged 83) Huntington, Indiana, U.S.
- Party: Democratic
- Education: Huntington University; Indiana University Maurer School of Law

John Edward Roush (September 12, 1920 – March 26, 2004) was an American lawyer and World War II veteran who served eight terms as a U.S. representative from Indiana from 1959 to 1969, and again from 1971 to 1977.

== Early life and career ==
Born in Barnsdall, Oklahoma, Roush graduated from Huntington High School, Huntington, Indiana, 1938. A.B., Huntington College, Huntington, Indiana, 1942. LL.B., Indiana University School of Law – Bloomington, Indiana, 1949.

=== World War II ===
He was in the United States Army from 1942 to 1946 and from 1950 to 1952. His later service was in the reserves, where he was promoted to major. He was a lawyer in private practice and served as member of the Indiana state legislature from 1949 to 1950.

Roush was elected prosecuting attorney of Huntington County, Indiana from 1954 to 1958, and to the Board of Trustees of Huntington College, Huntington, Indiana from 1958 to 1960, and from 1981 to 1987.

=== Congress ===
Roush was elected as a Democrat to the Eighty-sixth and to the four succeeding Congresses (January 3, 1959 – January 3, 1969). In the 1960 election for the Eighty-seventh congress, Roush's opponent George O. Chambers was at first declared the winner by 12 votes and certified by the state of Indiana as such. Roush contested the election and neither man was seated, though both were paid a congressman's salary and staff while the contest was decided. There was no Indiana law to govern recounts and so the House committee carried it out on its own rules, and at the conclusion declared Roush the winner by 99 votes. He was sworn in following a vote to seat him on June 14, 1961.

Redistricting by the Indiana legislature eliminated Roush's district and drew his home in Huntington into the Fort Wayne-based 4th Congressional District of E. Ross Adair, a Republican. Adair defeated Roush for reelection to the Ninety-first Congress in 1968.

Roush sought a rematch against Adair in 1970 and narrowly defeated him, and he served three more terms in the House (January 3, 1971 – January 3, 1977). Roush defeated State Senator Allan Bloom in 1972 and State Senator Walter P. Helmke in 1974.

He was an unsuccessful candidate for reelection to the Ninety-fifth Congress in 1976. Roush was defeated by future U.S. Senator and Vice President Dan Quayle.

== Later career and death ==
He served as director, regional and intergovernmental operations for the United States Environmental Protection Agency from 1977 to 1979, and as Interim president, Huntington College, Huntington, Indiana, in 1989.

He died on March 26, 2004, in Huntington, Indiana. He was interred in Pilgrim's Rest Cemetery, Huntington, Indiana.

The Huntington Reservoir was renamed J. Edward Roush Lake following congressional passage of a resolution authored by U.S. Representative Mark E. Souder.

== Legacy ==
Mr. Roush was instrumental in the establishment of the 911 emergency telephone system commonly used today.

U.S. House of Representatives
Preceded by John V. Beamer	Member of the U.S. House of Representatives from Indiana's 5th congressional district 1959 – 1969	Succeeded by Richard L. Roudebush
Preceded by E. Ross Adair	Member of the U.S. House of Representatives from Indiana's 4th congressional district 1971 – 1977	Succeeded by Dan Quayle
