= Martín Cárdenas (botanist) =

Bolivian botanist (1899–1973)

- Born: 12 November 1889; Cochabamba, Bolivia
- Died: 14 February 1973 (aged 83); Cochabamba, Bolivia
- Awards: Mary Soper Pope Memorial Award (1950)
- Scientific career
- Fields: Botany
- Author abbrev. (botany): Cárdenas

Martín Cárdenas Hermosa (12 November 1889 – 14 February 1973) was a Bolivian botanist. Cárdenas is considered one of the most important botanists in Bolivia's history. He is responsible for recording some 6,500 species of plants in his native country.

== Biography ==
In 1918, he graduated as a Bachelor in Biological Sciences and Letters and secured a scholarship to continue his studies at the Instituto Normal Superior in La Paz, where he specialized in Biology and Chemistry. He graduated in 1922. On his vacations in Cochabamba he went for long walks by gathering plants, of which he soon recorded their characteristics in books and journals at the Municipal Library of La Paz. At that time, Cardenas had met Swedish botanist Erik Asplund, who had also shown a keen interest in studying the plants in Bolivia. Asplund played an important role in enhancing his knowledge of botany and was an early mentor for him.

By May 1922, Cárdenas was already professor in the Special Natural Sciences and Chemistry, being an auxiliary senior instructor and later obtained a title at the Instituto Normal Superior de La Paz.

In his career, over a 40 or 50-year period, Cárdenas classified 6,500 species of the flora of Bolivia, and described 180 new species and 16 varieties of cactus. He also registered 26 types of Solanum tuberosum with six varieties.

In 1951, he was awarded the Mary Soper Pope Memorial Award in botany.
