= Easter lily cactus =

Easter lily cactus can refer to:

- Echinopsis oxygona
- Leucostele chiloensis
- Lobivia ancistrophora

== See also ==
- Easter cactus Rhipsalidopsis gaertneri
