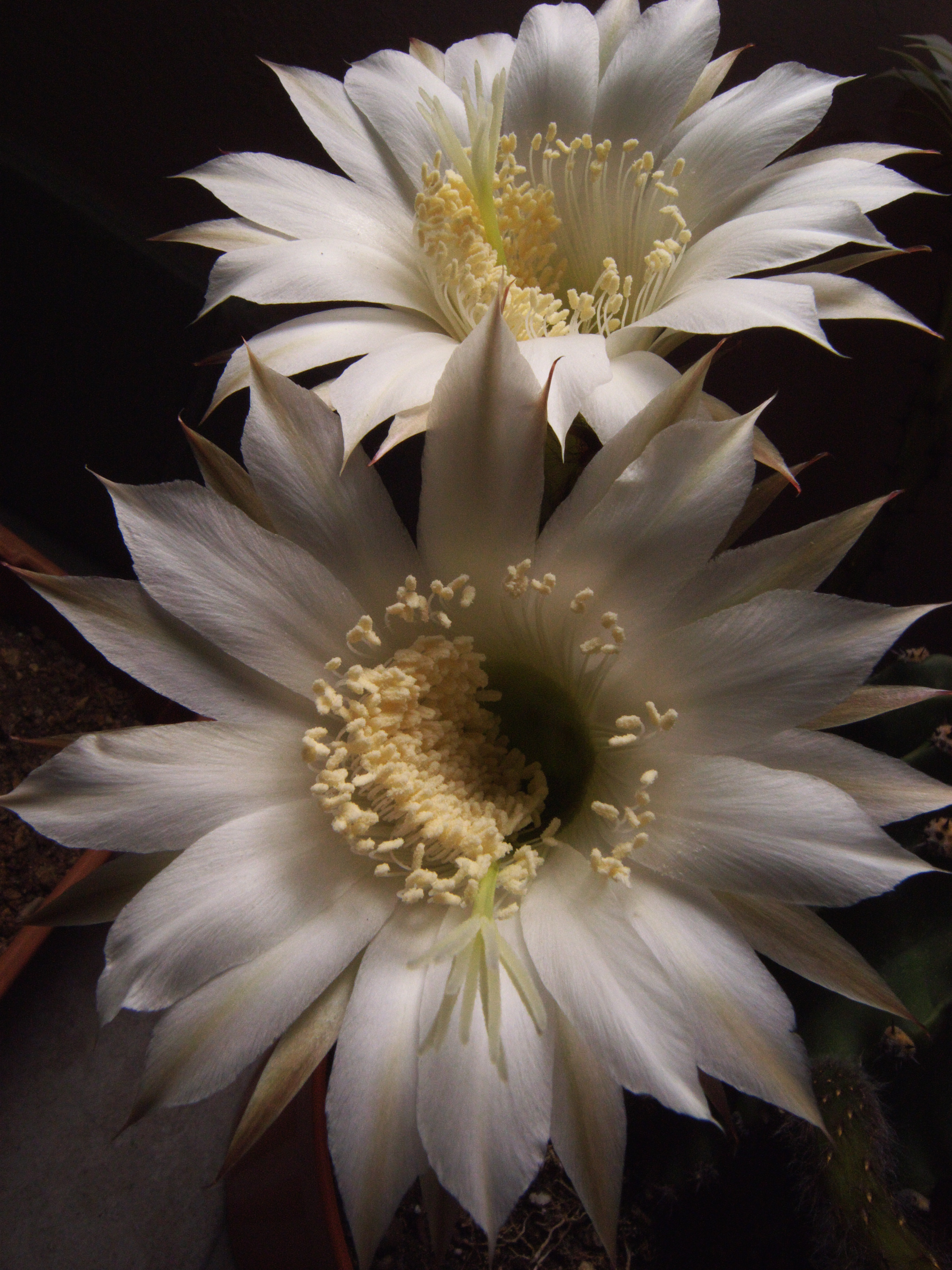

Scientific classification
- Kingdom: Plantae
- Clade: Embryophytes
- Clade: Tracheophytes
- Clade: Spermatophytes
- Clade: Angiosperms
- Clade: Eudicots
- Order: Caryophyllales
- Family: Cactaceae
- Subfamily: Cactoideae
- Genus: Echinopsis
- Species: E. oxygona

Binomial name
- Echinopsis oxygona (Link) Zucc. ex Pfeiff. & Otto

Synonyms
- List: Cactus sulcatus Poit., nom. superfl.; Cereus decaisneanus (Lem.) Mottet; Cereus eyriesii (Turpin) Pfeiff.; Cereus jasmineus Pfeiff.; Cereus multiplex var. monstrosus Pfeiff.; Cereus multiplex Pfeiff.; Cereus oxygonus (Link) Otto; Cereus schelhasii Pfeiff.; Cereus tubiflorus Endl., nom. illeg.; Cereus tubiflorus Pfeiff.; Cereus turbinatus Pfeiff.; Echinocactus boutillieri J.Parm. ex Pfeiff.; Echinocactus decaisneanus (Lem.) Steud.; Echinocactus eyriesii var. glaucus Lindl.; Echinocactus eyriesii Turpin; Echinocactus gemmatus Otto; Echinocactus multiplex Otto, nom. subnud.; Echinocactus octogonus G.Don; Echinocactus oxygonus Link; Echinocactus sulcatus Pfeiff.; Echinocactus tubiflorus (Pfeiff.) Hook.; Echinocactus turbinatus (Pfeiff.) Pfeiff.; Echinonyctanthus decaisneanus Lem.; Echinonyctanthus eyriesii (Turpin) Lem.; Echinonyctanthus multiplex (Pfeiff.) Lem.; Echinonyctanthus nigrispinus Lem.; Echinonyctanthus oxygonus (Link) Lem.; Echinonyctanthus pictus Lem.; Echinonyctanthus schelhasii (Pfeiff.) Lem.; Echinonyctanthus tubiflorus (Pfeiff.) Lem.; Echinonyctanthus turbinatus (Pfeiff.) Lem.; Echinopsis adolfofriedrichii G.Moser; Echinopsis brasiliensis Frič ex Pazout; Echinopsis decaisniana (Lem.) Walp.; Echinopsis derenbergii var. blossfeldii Backeb.; Echinopsis derenbergii Frič; Echinopsis eyriesii var. cristata Donn.Sm.; Echinopsis eyriesii var. duvallii Schelle; Echinopsis eyriesii var. glauca C.F.Först.; Echinopsis eyriesii var. glaucescens C.F.Först.; Echinopsis eyriesii var. grandiflora Rud.Mey.; Echinopsis eyriesii var. major Schelle; Echinopsis eyriesii var. phyligera Schelle; Echinopsis eyriesii var. pudantii P.Fourn.; Echinopsis eyriesii var. rosea Link ex Schelle; Echinopsis eyriesii var. schelhasii (Pfeiff. & Otto) P.Fourn.; Echinopsis eyriesii var. tettavii Jacobi; Echinopsis eyriesii var. triumphans Jacobi; Echinopsis eyriesii var. wilkensii Linke ex Bosse; Echinopsis eyriesii (Turpin) Pfeiff. & Otto; Echinopsis gemmata var. decaisneana (Lem.) Schelle; Echinopsis gemmata var. schelhasii (Pfeiff. & Otto) Schelle; Echinopsis jamesiana Monv.; Echinopsis melanacantha A.Dietr.; Echinopsis multiplex var. monstrosa (Pfeiff.) Gürke; Echinopsis multiplex (Pfeiff.) Zucc. ex Pfeiff. & Otto; Echinopsis nigrispina (Lem.) Walp.; Echinopsis oxygona var. turbinata Mittler ex Labour.; Echinopsis paraguayensis Mundt ex F.Ritter; Echinopsis picta (Lem.) Walp.; Echinopsis pudantii Pfersdorf ex Roth; Echinopsis quehlii R.Mey.; Echinopsis rohlandii K.Schum.; Echinopsis schelhasii Pfeiff. & Otto; Echinopsis schwantesii Frič; Echinopsis tettavii Kratz; Echinopsis tubiflora var. paraguayensis Rud.Mey.; Echinopsis tubiflora (Pfeiff.) Zucc. ex A.Dietr.; Echinopsis turbinata (Pfeiff.) Pfeiff. & Otto; Echinopsis undulata Rother; Echinopsis wilkensii (Linke ex Bosse) K.Schum.; Echinopsis zuccarinii var. rolandii É.Morren; Echinopsis zuccarinii Pfeiff. & Otto; Rebutia multiplex (Pfeiff.) Roeder

= Echinopsis oxygona =

Species of cactus

Echinopsis oxygona, also known as Eyries cactus, Easter lily cactus or sea-urchin cactus, is a species of flowering plant in the cactus family Cactaceae, native to south Brazil, Uruguay, Paraguay and northeastern Argentina. Some species that have been described separately, including Echinopsis eyriesii and Echinopsis tubiflora, are now considered to be synonymous. The features of the species include a large flower, with sharply pointed lavender or white petals, and a sweet scent.

== Description ==
Echinopsis oxygona grows singly or in groups. The spherical to short cylindrical, dark green shoots reach heights of up to 75 cm (30 in) with a diameter of up to 15 cm (5.9 in). There are 8 to 18 ribs. The white to tan, gray or black areoles are up to 2 cm (0.79 in) apart. The spines that emerge from the areoles vary in size and number. In plants that have been treated as E. eyriesii, there are 10–15 very short spines. In plants that have been treated as E. oxygona, the spines are longer: the one to five strong central spines are up to 3–3.5 cm (1.2–1.4 in) long, and there are up to 20 thinner radial spines up to 2.5 cm (1.0 in) long. Plants produce white, lavender or pale red flowers that open at night. The flowers are up to 25 cm (9.8 in) long and up to 10 cm (3.9 in) across.

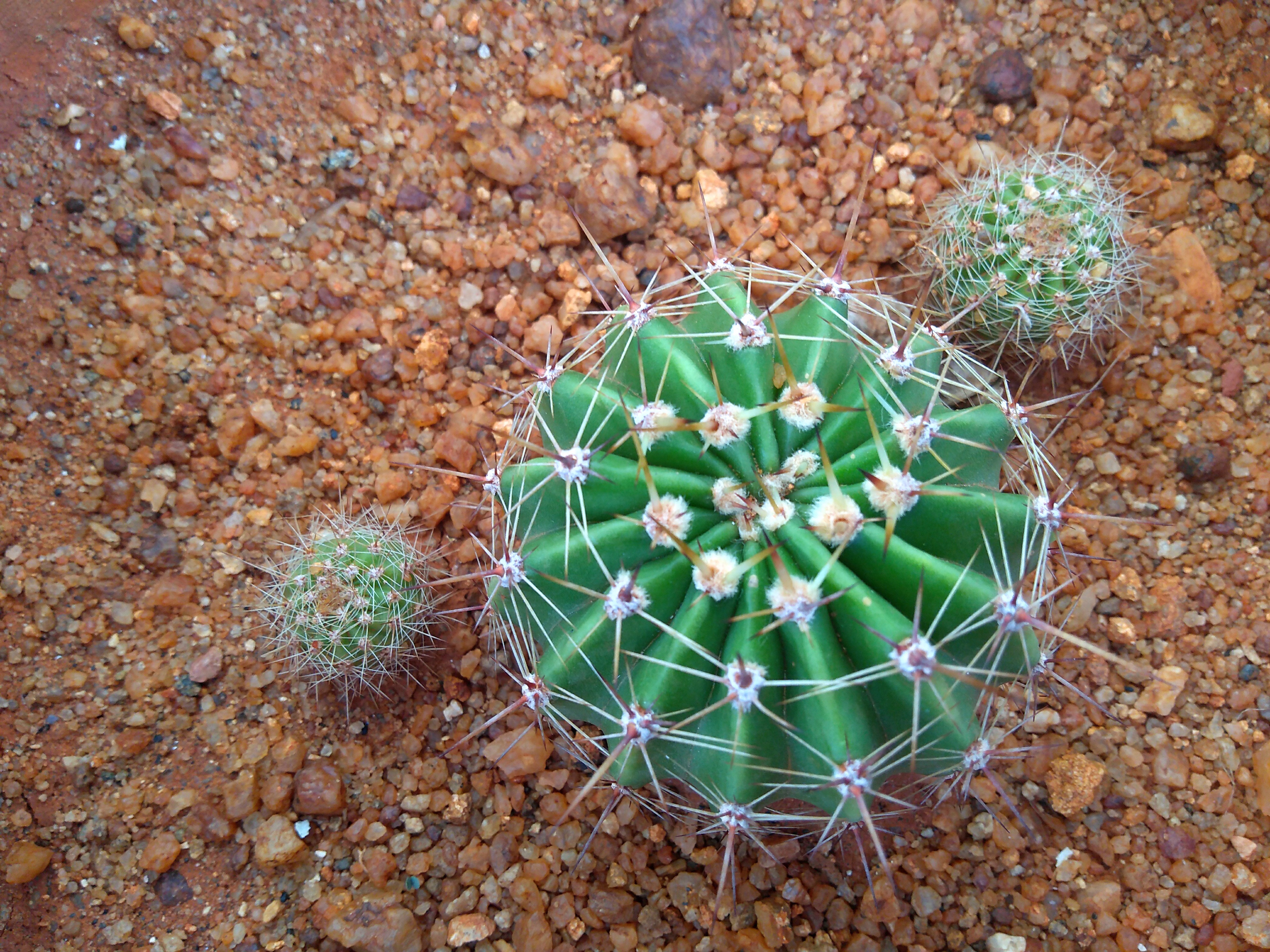
Replanted plants with young offsets

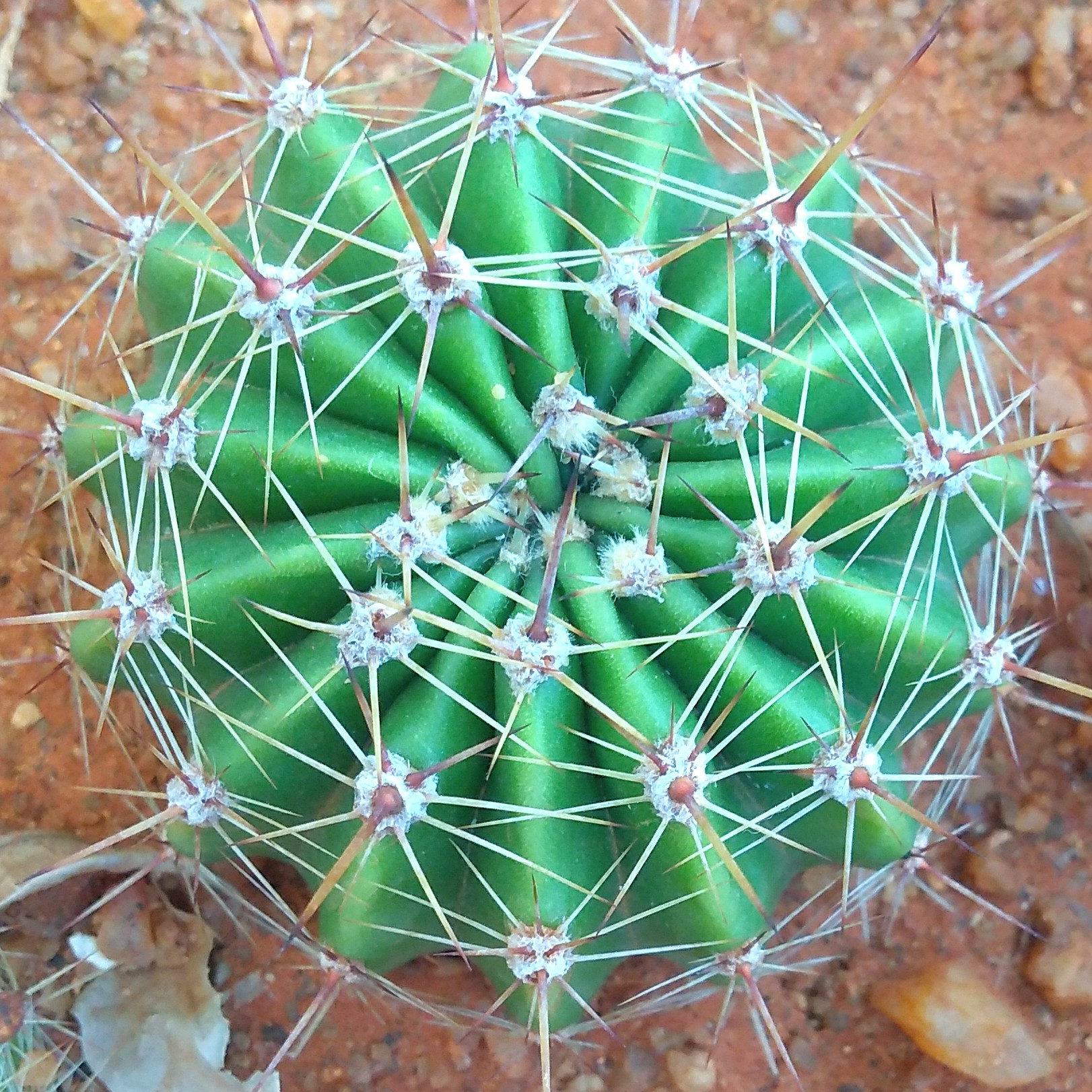
Plant with long spines

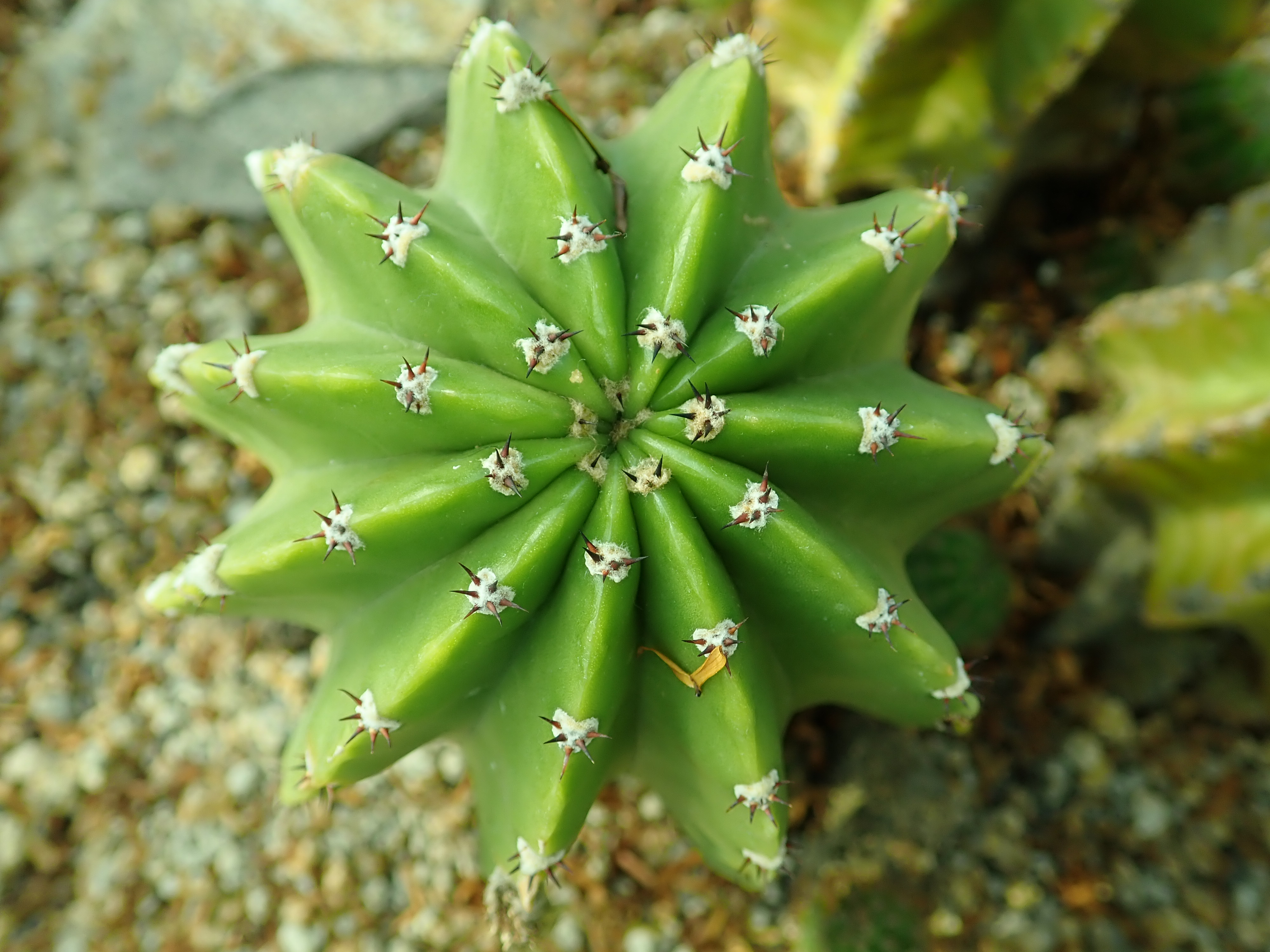
Plants with short spines have been described as E. eyriesii

== Habitat ==
Echinopsis oxygona, native to Southern Brazil, Uruguay, Paraguay and Entre Ríos Province, Argentina, thrives in lowland environments, reaching altitudes of up to 1,000 meters above sea level. In these areas, there is a tropical and continental climate, characterized by arid winters and humid summers. The annual precipitation in these regions amounts to approximately 1,500 mm, sustaining an average annual temperature range of 25–30°C, rarely dropping below zero degrees.

== Cultivation ==
Echinopsis oxygona is known for having huge, showy flowers at the ends of long tubes which are connected to the cactus. The flower has a sweet smell. The flower opens in the evening and wilts the next afternoon on hot days. It grows well in full sun, or light shade. These cacti can stand strong heat, and even temperatures as low as −10 °C (14 °F). Usually these are outdoor plants. They are used to the dry, desert climate, so they do not need to be watered every day.

In the 19th century, Echinopsis oxygona was extensively hybridized with other Echinopsis and Lobivia species, giving rise to a number of cultivars with large colourful flowers.

In cultivation in the UK this plant has received the Royal Horticultural Society's Award of Garden Merit.

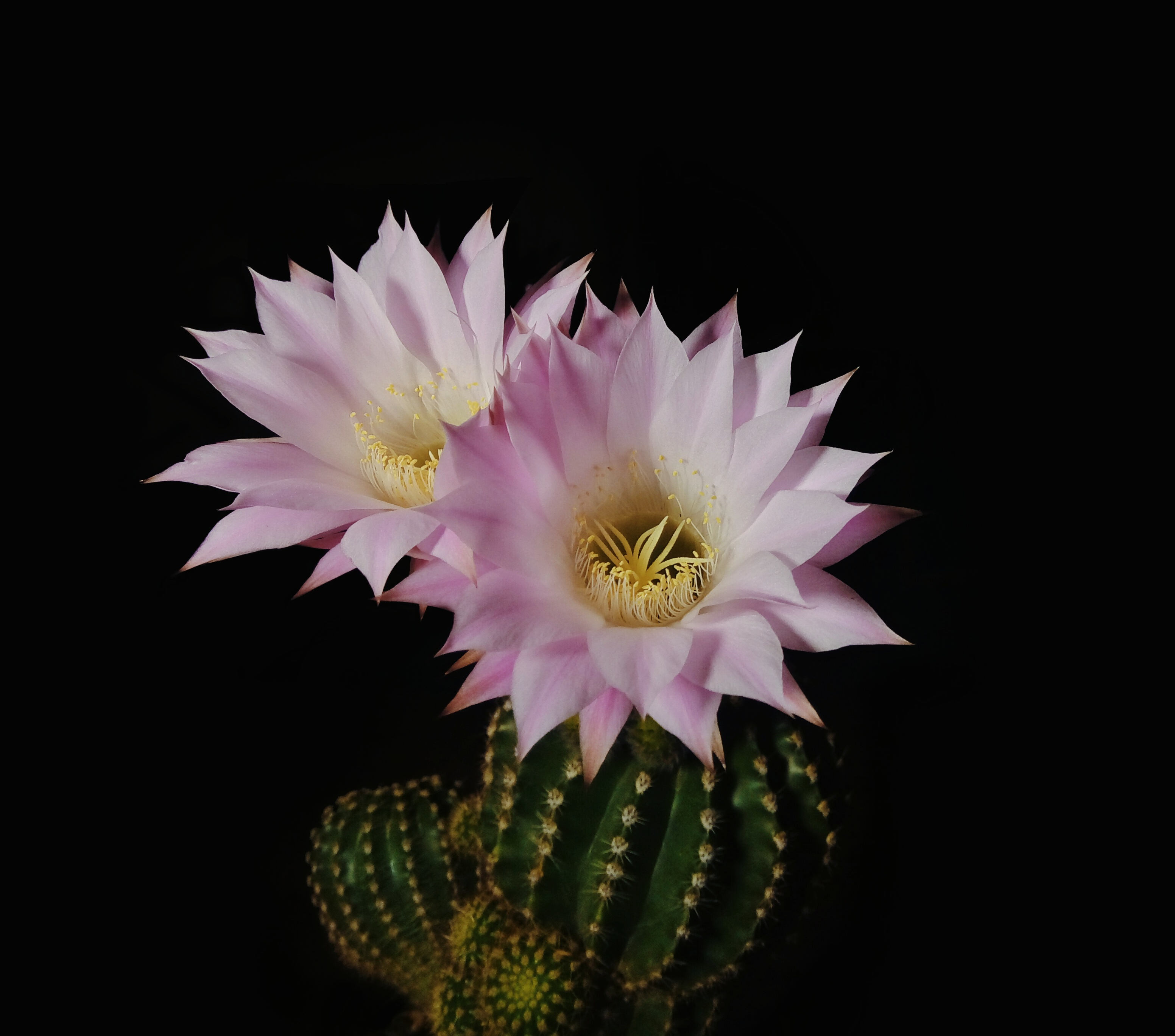

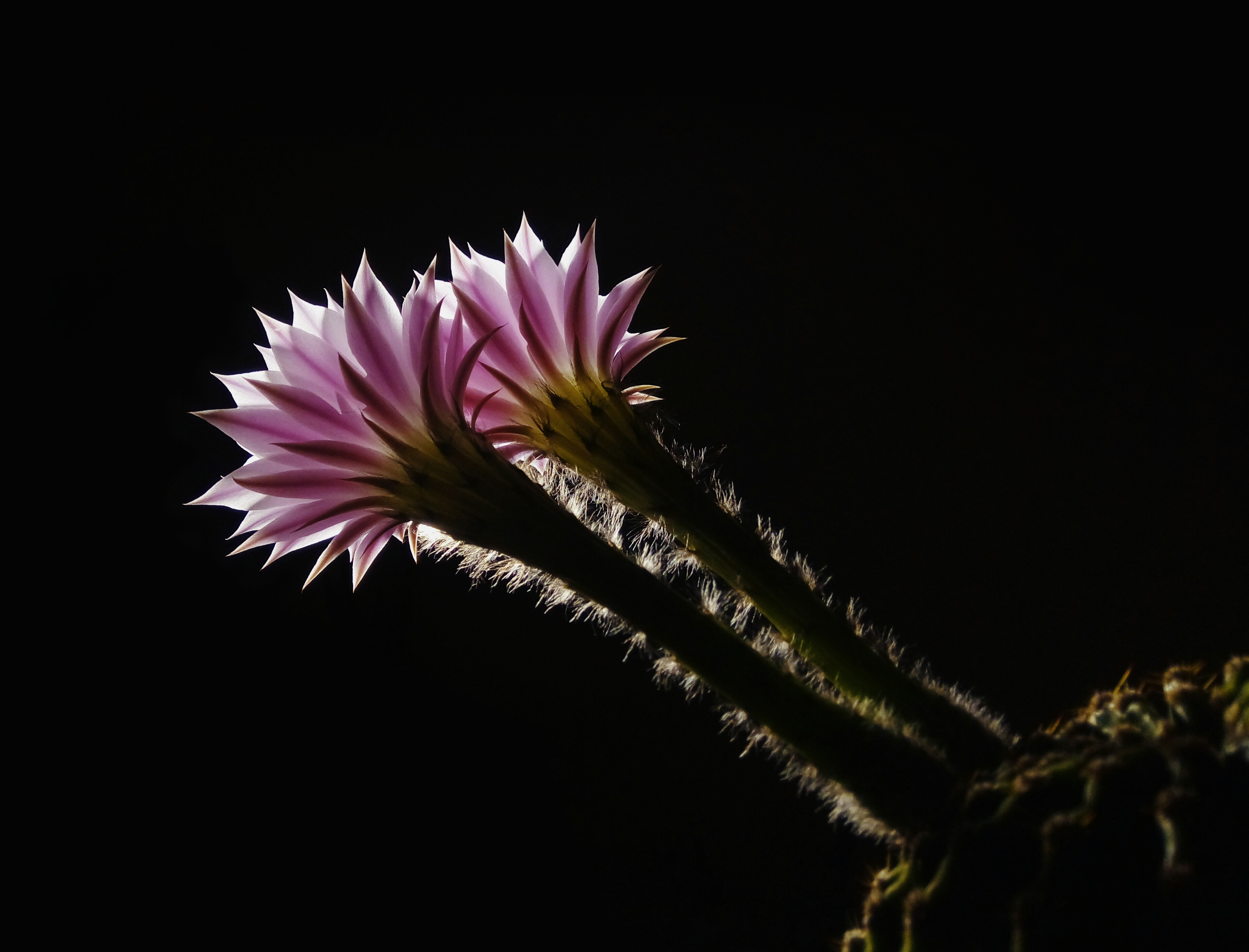

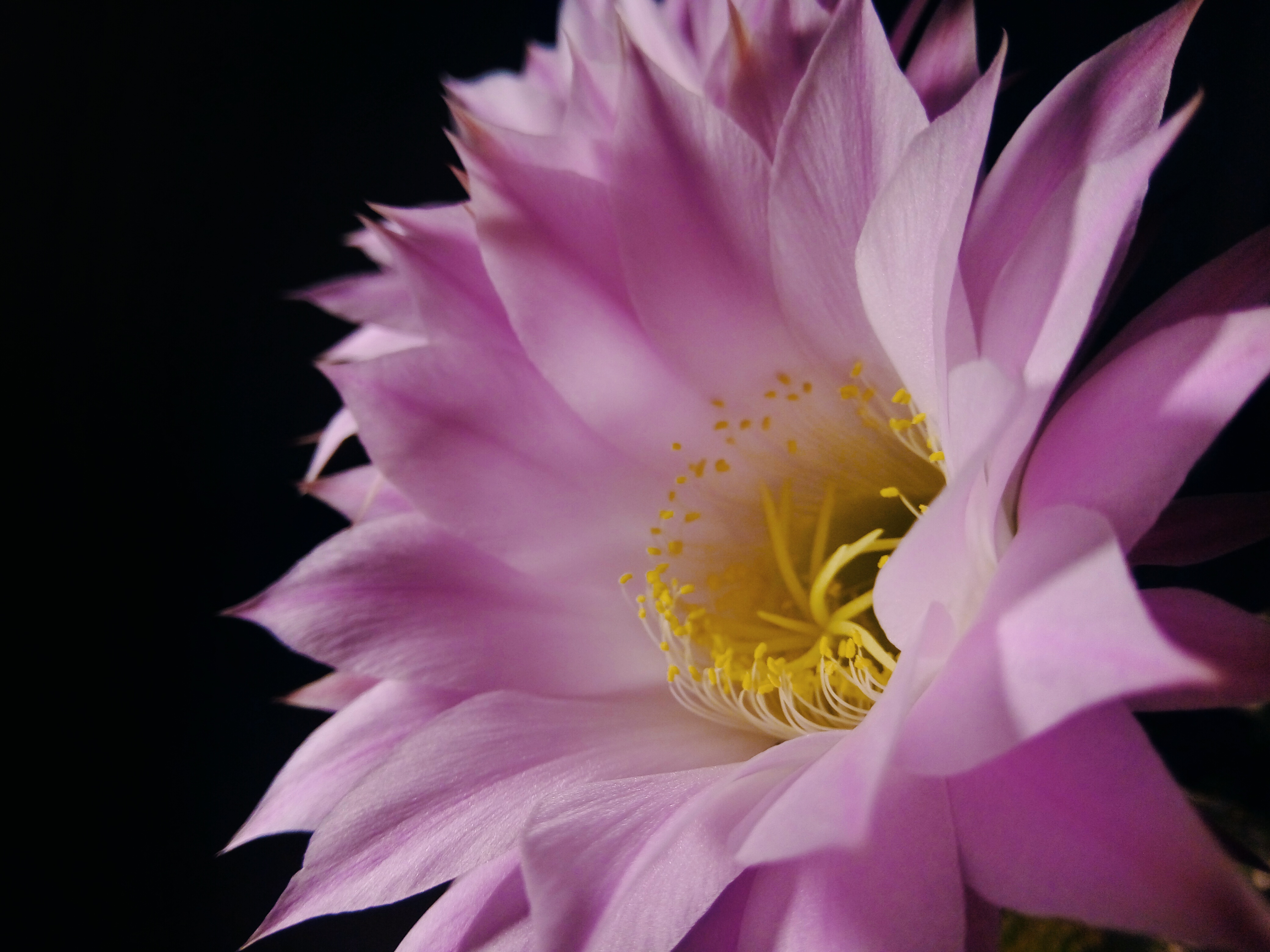

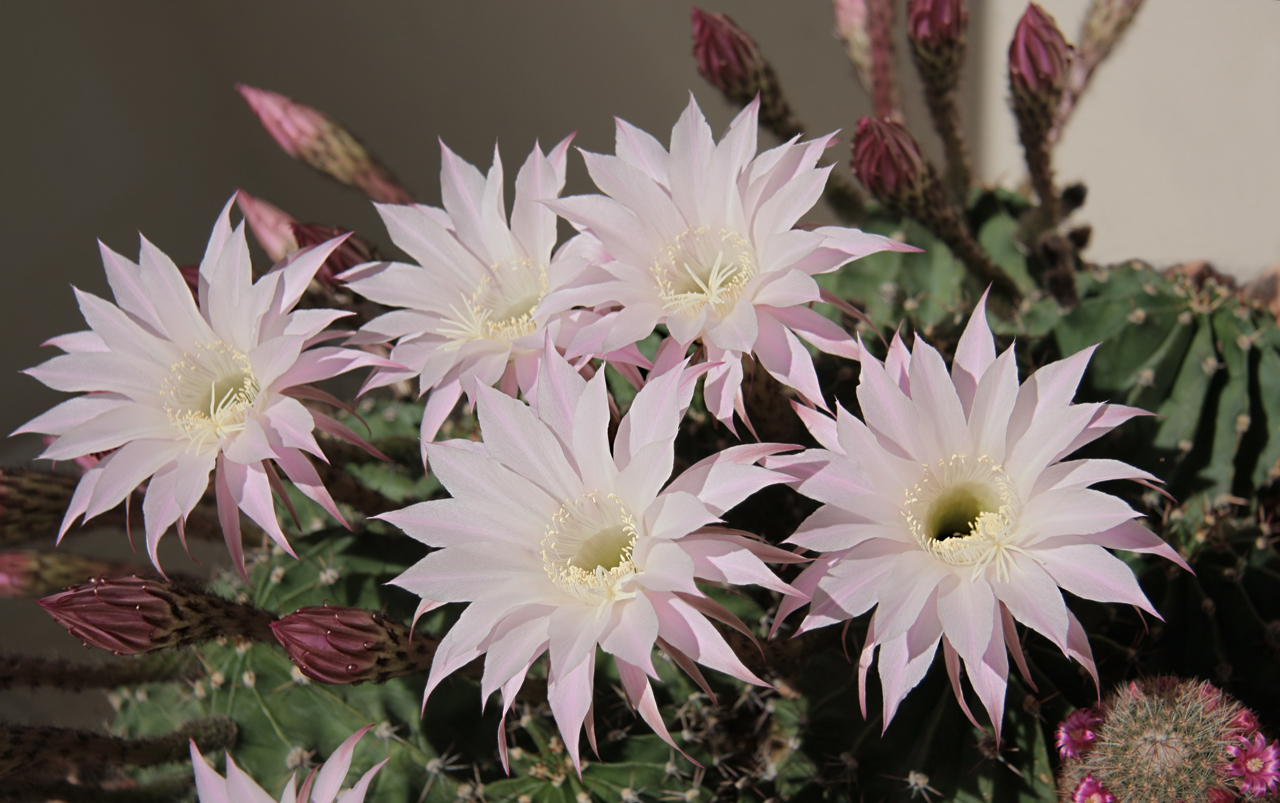

=== Propagation ===
Usually, the cactus will start to have small offsets appear at its base. These can be plucked off and transplanted into a different pot for further growth into a mature cactus. Usually, the cactus will bloom in mid summer. If cultivated away from seasonal temperature changes, the bloom can be initiated any time during the year (assuming sufficient maturity), by watering the cactus after a longer dry period.
